= List of Peesh ili luzhesh episodes =

Television game show episode list

About the series
- Peesh ili luzhesh is a Bulgarian television mystery music game show broadcast by Nova, featuring its format based on the South Korean programme I Can See Your Voice.
- More about the series

Episodes overview
- Total episode(s): 40
- Aired episode(s): 36
- Special episode(s): 4

The Bulgarian television mystery music game show Peesh ili luzhesh (Bulgarian: Пееш или лъжеш; lit. 'Are you singing or lying?') has played a total of four seasons and 40 episodes; broadcasting on Nova with its first run from 3 November to 31 December 2016, (Note: New Year's Eve concerts: s1: Rosen Belov was initially a bad singer in-game before actually turning good.; s2: Dimitar Shutev and Peteo Nguyen were initially bad singers in-game before actually turning good.; In addition to Galena and good singer Mario Todorov, Miro was also absent, which subsequently replaced by Raffi Boghosyan as a partner of good singer Nadia Kazakova.: s3: Valentina Aleksieva, Hristo Stakev, Juliana Deneva, and Nayden Stoyanov were initially bad singers in-game before actually turning good.; Fiki's father Toni Storaro was assigned as a partner of good singer Donko Markov.) and a second since 22 September 2024.

In contrast to the original South Korean programme and its respective local adaptations that produce "taped" episodes, the Bulgarian counterpart aired a kids special through live broadcast and to include a sign language interpreter, making it the first game in I Can See Your Voice franchise. (Note: Highlight: The 4th season's kids special (under collaboration by UNICEF for charitable reasons) featured guest artists Fiki, Toni Dimitrova, Desi Slava, Galena, Miro, Veselin Marinov, Mihaela Marinova, and Orlin Pavlov performing with designated mystery singers in-game; without guest artist(s), public voting is also conducted for the winning pair instead.)

== Series overview ==
Series	Episodes	Originally released		Good singers	Bad singers
Series	Episodes	First released	Last released	Good singers	Bad singers
1	7	3 November 2016	18 December 2016	4	3
2	10	22 September 2024	8 December 2024	6	4
3	12	28 September 2025	14 December 2025	7	5
4	7	27 September 2026	present	3	4
Sp	4	31 December 2016	20 September 2026	1	0

== Episodes ==
=== Season 1 (2016) ===
List of season 1 episodes
No. overall	No. in season	Guest artist(s)	Player order (Note: It refers to the guest artist(s) that have played in according to their first game; returning guest artists (which also include foreigners or former good singers, with their names displaying in italics) are not counted.)	Original release date
1	1	Lubo Kirov	1	3 November 2016
2	2	Lucy Diakovska (No Angels)	2	10 November 2016
3	3	Krisko	3	14 November 2016
4	4	Veselin Marinov	4	21 November 2016
5	5	Atanas Penev (B.T.R.)	5	28 November 2016
6	6	Margarita Hranova	6	5 December 2016
7	7	Yordanka Hristova	7	18 December 2016

=== Season 2 (2024) ===
List of season 2 episodes
No. overall	No. in season	Guest artist(s)	Player order	Original release date
8	1	Veselin Marinov	—	22 September 2024
9	2	Galena	8	29 September 2024
10	3	Toni Dimitrova	9	6 October 2024
11	4	Konstantin	10	13 October 2024
12	5	Miro	11	20 October 2024
13	6	Doni	12	3 November 2024
14	7	Anelia	13	10 November 2024
15	8	Mihaela Fileva	14	17 November 2024
16	9	Orlin Goranov	15	24 November 2024
17	10	Desi Slava	16	8 December 2024

=== Season 3 (2025) ===
List of season 3 episodes
No. overall	No. in season	Guest artist(s)	Player order	Original release date
18	1	Azis	17	28 September 2025
19	2	Yordanka Hristova	—	5 October 2025
20	3	Vladimir Zombori	18	12 October 2025
21	4	Sofi Marinova	19	19 October 2025
22	5	Mihaela Marinova	20	26 October 2025
23	6	Preslava	21	2 November 2025
24	7	Grafa	22	9 November 2025
25	8	Dara	23	16 November 2025
26	9	Bratya Argirovi	24	23 November 2025
27	10	Fiki	25	30 November 2025
28	11	Petya Buyuklieva	26	7 December 2025
29	12	Orlin Pavlov	27	14 December 2025

=== Season 4 (2026) ===
Upcoming guest artist(s), 3 confirmed: 3 debuts (Emilia, Silvia Katsarova, Kerana)

List of season 4 episodes
No. overall	No. in season	Guest artist(s)	Player order	Original release date
30	1	Roksana	28	27 September 2026
31	2	Daniel Peev	29	4 October 2026
32	3	Krisko	—	11 October 2026
33	4	Margarita Hranova	—	18 October 2026
35	5	Lubo Kirov	—	8 November 2026
36	6	Gloria	30	15 November 2026
37	7	Milko Kalaidjiev	31	22 November 2026
38	8	TBA	32	29 November 2026
39	9	TBA	33	6 December 2026
40	10	TBA	34	13 December 2026

== Specials ==
List of special episodes
No.	Title	Original release date
1	"New Year's Eve Concert — 2017 edition"	31 December 2016
2	"New Year's Eve Concert — 2025 edition"	31 December 2024
3	"New Year's Eve Concert — 2026 edition"	31 December 2025
4	"Kids special"	20 September 2026
5	"New Year's Eve Concert — 2027 edition"	31 December 2026
