= Peesh ili luzhesh season 4 =

Television game show season

Peesh ili luzhesh
- Season 4
- Starring: Andrei Arnaudov; Ivan Hristov; Aleksandra Raeva
- Hosted by: Dimitar Rachkov
- Winners: Good singers: 4; Bad singers: 4
- No. of episodes: Regular: 7; Special: 1; Overall: 8

Release
- Original network: Nova
- Original release: 20 September 2026 – present

Season chronology
- ← Previous; Season 3

The fourth season of the Bulgarian television mystery music game show Peesh ili luzhesh premiered on Nova with a kids special on 20 September 2026 through live broadcast and to include a sign language interpreter, making it the first game in I Can See Your Voice franchise. (Note: Season highlight: The 4th season's kids special (under collaboration by UNICEF for charitable reasons) featured all of eight returning guest artists performing with designated mystery singers in-game; without guest artist(s), public voting is also conducted for the winning pair instead.)

== Gameplay ==
=== Format ===
According to the original South Korean rules, the guest artist must attempt to eliminate bad singers during its game phase. At the final performance, the last remaining mystery singer is revealed as either good or bad by means of a duet between them and one of the guest artists.

For this season, the Golden Switch (Bulgarian: Златен шалтер) has different functions:

- For regular games, the Golden Switch can be used during the proper game phase to apply one randomly-selected mystery singer as an additional hint. However, the guest artist(s) can still able to eliminate that, even if they are revealed as good or bad.
- For the kids special, each mystery singer must use the Golden Switch to randomly select a singing partner to perform with.

The winning mystery singer, regardless of being good or bad, gets €3,000 and will have to perform again at the encore concert.

=== Rounds ===
1. First impression (Bulgarian: Първо впечатление)
  The guest artist is given some time to observe and examine each mystery singer based on their appearance.
2. Introduction (Bulgarian: Представяне)
  Each mystery singer self-introduces to guest artist and panelists. Good singers are telling the truth, while bad singers are allowed to lie. Afterwards, the guest artist must eliminate one mystery singer from each half of the lineup.
3. Lip sync (Bulgarian: Синхронизация на устните)
  Each mystery singer performs a lip sync to a song; good singers mime to a recording of their own, while bad singers mime to a backing track by another vocalist.
4. Look at my voice (Bulgarian: Виж гласът ми)
  A muted video of each mystery singer that reveals only 0.3 seconds of their singing voice is played as an additional hint.
5. 60 seconds (Bulgarian: 60 секунди)
  The guest artist may ask questions to the remaining mystery singers. Good singers are required to give truthful responses, while the bad singers must lie.

== Episodes ==
=== Guest artists ===
Legend:
Good singer
Bad singer
Name(s) Golden Switch selection

Upcoming guest artist(s), 3 confirmed: 3 debuts (Emilia, Silvia Katsarova, Kerana)

Episode		Guest artist (Note: Players' notes: For the returning guest artists (who also include foreigners and former good singers), names are displayed in italics.; For the mixed groups, names who identified as bad singers are displayed in italics.)	Mystery singers (In their respective numbers and aliases)							
#	Date	Guest artist	Elimination order							Winner
#	Date	Guest artist	First impression	Introduction		Lip sync		Look at my voice	Interrogation	Winner
Special	20 September 2026	—N/a	3f. Fiki and Andrei Bozhilov (Engineer)	3h. Desi Slava and Ivan Stanev (Twin Brother)	3b. Galena and Ema Savova (The Skillful One)	3g. Mihaela Marinova and Elina Tsekova (Swimmer)	3a. Orlin Pavlov and Boris Matsov (Geographer)	3c. Veselin Marinov and Mihail Stoev (Track and Field Athlete)	3d. Toni Dimitrova and Lora Mihailova (Protectress of the Nature)	3e. Miro and Mihaela Dimitrova; Dancer
1	27 September 2026	Roksana	3. Veneta Savova; (Combine Harvester Operator)	5. Kristiana Atanasova; (Model)	8. Aleksandrina Makendzhieva; (Masseuse)	6. Velislava Todorova; (Folk Singer)	1. Petar Ivanov; (Aquaman)	7. Dimitar Pehlivanov; (Trucker)	4. Nikol-Naomi Decheva; (Jeweller)	2. Simona Ivanova; Sister of the Aquaman
2	4 October 2026	Daniel Peev	3. Nikola Konstantinov; (Climber)	6. Tereza Nikolova; (Off-road Driver)	8. Flamena Ivanova; (Golfer)	2. Ralitsa Kandova; (Gymnast)	5. Nia Stoyanova; (Audio Engineer)	1. Simona Stanoeva; (Cat Lover)	7. Vasil Dimitrov; (Hairdresser)	4. Radina Neikova; Pianist
3	11 October 2026	Krisko	5. Aleksandar Savov; (Badminton Player)	1. Kaloyan Kokosharov; (Rapper)	4. Ivana Ferdova; (Painter)	6. Yana Lamparova; (Waitress)	8. Nina Trendafilova; (Kangoo Jumper)	7. Viktoria Boyanova; (Actress)	3. Nikolai Veselinov; (Upholsterer)	2. Rositsa Stoilova; Photography Model
4	18 October 2026	Margarita Hranova	3. Karina Skrimova; (Puzzler)	6. Aleksandrina Tsvetanova; (Painter)	4. Boryana Androva; (Photographer)	2. Martin Dimitrov; (Kickboxer)	5. Petra Tsarnorechka; (Hip-hop Diva)	8. Krasimira Aleksandrova; (Swimmer)	1. Margarita Moschovakis; (Hostess)	7. Dara Pesheva; Health and Wellness Coach
5	8 November 2026	Lubo Kirov	2. Elena Nikolova; (Wrestler's Wife)	6. Rumiana Popova; (The Healthy One)	8. Paula Taskova; (Pilates Instructor)	5. Gabriela Grigorova; (Fencer)	7. Gabriela Valeva; (Bearded Lady)	4. Katya Vasileva; (Pilot)	3. Gabriela Grudeva; (Mother)	1. Yani Nikolov; Wrestler
6	15 November 2026	Gloria	5. Valentin Angelov; (Selfie Guy)	1. Delyan Dechev; (Launderer)	3. Valeri Stanev; (Mr. Grandpa)	7. Iliana Malinova; (Dentist)	2. Viktor Chiporikov; (Drone Operator)	6. Maria Stefanova; (Poetess)	8. Nadezhda Milkova; (Architect)	4. Nikolai Roidev; Stonemason
7	22 November 2026	Milko Kalaidjiev	7. Simeon Slavev; (Game Master)	1. Maria Yaneva; (Straight-A Student)	4. Zornitsa Pencheva; (Kinesiotherapist)	2. Andreia Todorova; (The Ceca)	6. Konastantin Kandev; (Longboarder)	8. Elena Stefanova; (Bedunika)	5. Lidiya Marinova; (Pole Dancer)	3. Gabriela Petrova; The Miss
8	29 November 2026	TBA	1. ()	2. ()	3. ()	4. ()	5. ()	6. ()	7. ()	8. ()
9	6 December 2026	TBA	1. ()	2. ()	3. ()	4. ()	5. ()	6. ()	7. ()	8. ()
10	13 December 2026	TBA	1. ()	2. ()	3. ()	4. ()	5. ()	6. ()	7. ()	8. ()

=== Panelists ===
Legend:
Regular panelist
Guest panelist

Apps		Panelists in attendance (Sorted by first appearance, with episode designations)
g#	p#	Panelists in attendance (Sorted by first appearance, with episode designations)
8	2	Andrei Arnaudov and Ivan Hristov (1–7; sp. 1)
6	1	Aleksandra Raeva (1, 3–5, 7; sp. 1)
1	18	Viktor Todorov and Marina Tsekova (sp. 1); Viktor Angelov and Gerasim Georgiev (1); Daniel Bachorski, Zlatka Dimitrova, and Martina Vachkova (2); Tsvetelina Petrova and Borislav Zahariev (3); Magarditch Halvadjian and Kristina Patrashkova (4); Mona and Kamen Vodenicharov (5); Anelia, DJ Damyan, and Simona Zagorova (6); Alisia and Nikolaos Tsitiridis (7)

== New Year's Eve Concert (31 December 2026) ==
Also in this season, the upcoming fourth encore concert is scheduled to be held on the last day of 2026, featuring some of invited guest artists and mystery singers return to perform one last time.

Peesh ili luzhesh season 4 — New Year's Eve Concert performances
Confirmed performers: Guest artists — Fiki, Desi Dobreva, Gloria, Milko Kalaidjiev, Silva Katsarova, and Kamen Vodenicharov; Mystery singers — Simona Ivanova, Radina Neikova, Rositsa Stoilova, Dara Pesheva, Yani Nikolov, and Nikolai Roidev; With special participations of: TBA
Performer(s)	Song(s)
