= Peesh ili luzhesh season 3 =

Television game show season

Peesh ili luzhesh
- Season 3
- Starring: Andrei Arnaudov; Ivan Hristov; Maria Ignatova
- Hosted by: Dimitar Rachkov (Note: After formally signing a contract with Global Group in June 2025, Nikolaos Tsitiridis has initially assigned to host for that entire season as a replacement to Rachkov, due to his prior commitments. Tsitiridis would subsequently return as a judge for the 9th season of bTV's rival show, Balgariya tarsi talant.)
- Winners: Good singers: 7 (Note: Season highlights: Valentina Aleksieva (ep. 2), Hristo Stakev (ep. 7), Juliana Deneva (ep. 9), and Nayden Stoyanov (ep. 11) were initially bad singers in-game before actually turning good.; Fiki's father Toni Storaro was assigned as a partner of good singer Donko Markov (ep. 10).); Bad singers: 5
- No. of episodes: Regular: 12; Special: 1; Overall: 13

Release
- Original network: Nova
- Original release: Regular season: 28 September – 14 December 2025; Special: 31 December 2025

Season chronology
- ← Previous; Season 2 Next → Season 4

The third season of the Bulgarian television mystery music game show Peesh ili luzhesh premiered on Nova on 28 September 2025.

== Gameplay ==
=== Format ===
According to the original South Korean rules, the guest artist must attempt to eliminate bad singers during its game phase. At the final performance, the last remaining mystery singer is revealed as either good or bad by means of a duet between them and one of the guest artists. (Note: Gameplay notes: The number of mystery singers are set to seven or eight.; Lip sync and introduction rounds are also swapped between 2nd and 3rd rounds.)

For this season, the Golden Switch (Bulgarian: Златен шалтер) can be used during the proper game phase to apply one randomly-selected mystery singer as an additional hint. However, the guest artist(s) can still able to eliminate that, even if they are revealed as good or bad.

The winning mystery singer, regardless of being good or bad, gets 5,000 лв (≈€2,600) and will have to perform again at the encore concert.

=== Rounds ===
1. First impression (Bulgarian: Първо впечатление)
  The guest artist is given some time to observe and examine each mystery singer based on their appearance.
2. Introduction (Bulgarian: Представяне)
  Each mystery singer self-introduces to guest artist and panelists. Good singers are telling the truth, while bad singers are allowed to lie.
3. Lip sync (Bulgarian: Синхронизация на устните)
  Each mystery singer performs a lip sync to a song; good singers mime to a recording of their own, while bad singers mime to a backing track by another vocalist.
4. Look at my voice (Bulgarian: Виж гласът ми)
  A muted video of each mystery singer that reveals only 0.3 seconds of their singing voice is played as an additional hint.
5. Interrogation (Bulgarian: Разпит)
  The guest artist may ask questions to the remaining mystery singers. Good singers are required to give truthful responses, while the bad singers must lie.

== Episodes ==
=== Guest artists ===
Legend:
Good singer
Bad singer
Name(s) Golden Switch selection

Episode		Guest artist (Note: Players' notes: For the returning guest artists (who also include foreigners and former good singers), names are displayed in italics.; For the mixed groups, names who identified as bad singers are displayed in italics.)	Mystery singers (In their respective numbers and aliases)							
#	Date	Guest artist	Elimination order							Winner
#	Date	Guest artist	First impression	Lip sync and introduction				Look at my voice	Interrogation	Winner
1	28 September 2025	Azis	1. Patricia Preslavska; (Pilot)	6. Aleksandra Ilieva; (Make-up Artist)	7. Greta Toteva; (Seamstress)	3. Viktoria Radeva; (Supermodel)	5. Zornitsa Petrova; (Autodidact)	8. Valeria and Beloslava; (Young Sisters)	2. Stanislav Rusinov; (Potato Vendor)	4. Maria-Magdalena Hristova-Petkova; Tattoo Artist
2	5 October 2025	Yordanka Hristova	5. Valentin Nikolov; (Housekeeper)	2. Martin Ivanov; (Costume Designer)	8. Simeon Borisov; (Futsal Player)	3. Georgi Zlatkov; (Broker)	7. Ivelina Kaymakanova; (Eco-activist)	4. Teodora Veleva; (Tennis Player)	1. Dimitar Purnarov; (Evangelist)	6. Valentina Aleksieva; Yogi
3	12 October 2025	Vladimir Zombori	3. Stefka Moneva; (Dog Lover)	2. Hrityan Stoyev; (Barber)	4. Melisa Daskalova; (Turkish Woman)	1. Aset Fleming; (Painter)		6. Kristina Gocheva; (Animator)	5. Temenuzhka Radovska; (Tennis Player)	7. Viktor Todorov; Fatherless Dad
4	19 October 2025	Sofi Marinova	5. Svetlozara Zhelyaskova; (Eyebrowed Girl)	2. Gancho Ganev; (Accordionist)	7. Atanas Sevdalinov; (Kebab Cook)	1. Anton Kottas; (Nice Guy)	3. Dimitrinka Mitova; (Rockstar)	6. Viktoria Dimova; (Intern)	8. Dimitar Kutsarov; (Painter)	4. Plamena Benova; Cheerleader
5	26 October 2025	Mihaela Marinova	6. Todor Mitev; (Table Tennis Player)	1. Anatoli Gavrailov; (Fitness Maniac)	8. Gloria-Mari Bocheva; (Boxer)	2. Svetlin Bankin-Svet; (Poetess)	5. Stefani Razsokolova; (Reality Star)	7. Vasilena Yordanova; (Ticket Agent)	4. Ivaila Goranova; (Beach Girl)	3. Tsvetan Awad; Arabian Expatriate
6	2 November 2025	Preslava	8. Boris Borisov; (Stuntman)	6. Nikolas Nikolov; (Influencer)	4. Mirela Zare; (Miss Teen Varna)	3. Plamen Gezanchov; (Track and Field Athlete)	1. David Georgiev; (Tour Guide)	7. Georgi Peev; (Deputy Director)	5. Tihomir Dimitrov; (Sea Captain)	2. Donika Stratieva; Wedding Planner
7	9 November 2025	Grafa	7. Elena Klicheva; (Pianist)	2. Sanya Kozhuharova; (Schoolgirl)	4. Zara Uzunova; (Fencer)	3. Natali Nedelcheva; (Movie Fanatic)	8. Krastina Slavova; (Pharmacist)	6. Vanesa Chausheva; (Guitarist's Girlfriend)	1. Gabriela Keremekchieva; (Headmistress)	5. Hristo Stakev; Guitarist
8	16 November 2025	Dara	5. Emili Marinova; (Magician)	1. Sabina Koseva; (Ballet Dancer)	7. Gabriela Yaneva; (Handmaiden)	4. Greta Ilieva; (J-pop Fanatic)	8. Nadezhda Dimitrova; (Equestrienne)	3. Biliana Atanasova; (Sailor)	2. Angel Nedelchev; (Keyboardist)	6. Raya Varbanova; Pharmacist
9	23 November 2025	Bratya Argirovi	2. Nadya Kostadinova; (Masseuse)	6. Ivanina Ivanova; (K-pop Fanatic)	8. Katerina Vasileva; (Akali)	5. Valentina Nedeva; (Zumba Instructor)	3. Siana Kamova; (Tango Dancer)	4. Polina Popova; (Freight Forwarder)	1. Irena Aleksandrova; (Master Craftswoman)	7. Juliana Deneva; Actress
10	30 November 2025	Fiki	1. Yordanka Stefanova; (Beautiful Freak)	6. Boris Brankov; (Hawaiian Guy)	7. Mediha Kehayova; (Geologist)	4. Stela Ilieva; (Dubber)	2. Ralitsa Haidarska; (Flamenco Dancer)	5. Dilyana Kirova; (Dentist)	3. Ivelina Hristova-Ivanova; (Metrologist)	8. Donko Markov; Seaman
11	7 December 2025	Petya Buyuklieva	1. Liliana Traycheva; (Fisherwoman)	5. Savina Ivanova; (Footballer's Consort)	4. Antonina Karabova; (Lawyer)	6. Hristo Hristov; (Salsa Dancer)	3. Sonia Pachulova-Kovacheva; (Swimmer)	7. Silvia Stoyanova; (Heroine Mother)	8. Dimitar Georgiev; (Jockey)	2. Nayden Stoyanov; Cinematographer
12	14 December 2025	Orlin Pavlov	5. Vladislav Nedkov; (Stand-up Comedian)	6. Lyubamira Shosheva; (Figure Skater)	3. Rostislava Vulkova; (Ballet Dancer)	1. Beloslava Angelova; (Chef)	8. Pavela Gercheva; (Freestyle Dancer)	7. Kristian Stoyanov; (Theatre Actor)	2. Georgi Jalazov; (Antique Collector)	4. Yoanna Yovcheva; Jeweller

=== Panelists ===
Legend:
Regular panelist
Guest panelist

Apps		Panelists in attendance (Sorted by first appearance, with episode designations)
g#	p#	Panelists in attendance (Sorted by first appearance, with episode designations)
12	3	Andrei Arnaudov, Ivan Hristov, and Maria Ignatova (1–12)
2	1	Stanislava Armutlieva (5, 8)
1	25	Desi Slava and DJ Damyan (1); Magarditch Halvadjian and Hristo Stoichkov (2); Vesela Babinova and Velizar Velichkov (3); Konstantin and Roksana (4); Elizabet Zaharieva (5); Milko Kalaidjiev and Ivelina Koleva (6); Gerasim Georgiev and Rumen Ugrinski (7); Veniamin Dimitrov (8); Toni Dimitrova and Veselin Marinov (9); Darin Angelov and Kristina Patrashkova (10); Ivo Arakov and Deyan Nedelchev (11); Leo Bianchi (Note: Panelists' note: Foreign attendee: Leo Bianchi (ITA)) and Divna Stancheva (12)

== New Year's Eve Concert (31 December 2025) ==
Also in this season, a third encore concert was held on the last day of 2025, featuring some of invited guest artists and mystery singers return to perform one last time.

Peesh ili luzhesh season 3 — New Year's Eve Concert performances
With special participations of: Andrei Arnaudov, Raffi Boghosyan, Magarditch Halvadjian, Ivan Hristov, and Maria Ignatova
Performer(s)	Song(s)
Lip sync performances
Azis and Maria-Magdalena Hristova-Petkova	"Djalma" (Джалма) — Riton
Yordanka Hristova and Valentina Aleksieva	"Salma Ya Salama" — Ishtar (of Alabina) and Gipsy Kings
Vladimir Zombori and Viktor Todorov	"Bang Bang" — Jessie J, Ariana Grande and Nicki Minaj
Sofi Marinova and Plamena Benova	"Bitter Wine" (Горчиво вино) — Veselin Marinov
Mihaela Marinova and Tsvetan Awad	"Barbie Girl" — Aqua
Preslava and Donika Stratieva	"Women are Flowers" (Жените са цветя) — Gloria and Toni Dacheva
Grafa and Hristo Stakev	"The Ketchup Song (Aserejé)" — Las Ketchup
Dara and Raya Varbanova	"APT." — Rosé and Bruno Mars
Bratya Argirovi and Juliana Deneva	"In Another Life" (В друг живот) — Doni and Sofi Marinova
Toni Storaro and Donko Markov	"Premonition Song" (Предчувствие за стих) — Bratya Argirovi
Petya Buyuklieva and Nayden Stoyanov	"Give My Life" — Army of Lovers
Orlin Pavlov and Yoanna Yovcheva	"The Wolf and the Seven Young Goats" (Вълкът и седемте козлета) — Mimi Ivanova and Razvigor Popov
Live duet performances
Azis and Maria-Magdalena Hristova-Petkova	"Black Sheep" (Черната овца) — Ahat
Yordanka Hristova and Valentina Aleksieva	"Childhood Memory" (Детски спомен) — Kristina Dimitrova and Orlin Goranov
Vladimir Zombori and Viktor Todorov	"We Are the World" — USA for Africa
Sofi Marinova and Plamena Benova	"Po-po-po" (По, по, по) — Galena and Azis
Mihaela Marinova and Tsvetan Awad	"All-time Lady" (Жена на всички времена) — Petya Buyuklieva
Preslava and Donika Stratieva	"Jovano Jovanke" (Йовано, Йованке) — Traditional folk song
Grafa and Hristo Stakev	"Little Prince" (Малкият принц) — Doni and Momchil
Dara and Raya Varbanova	"Water" (Вода) — Elitsa & Stoyan
Bratya Argirovi and Juliana Deneva	"Maybe" (Може би) — Signal
Toni Storaro and Donko Markov	"Who Raised the Flag?" (Кой уши байрака?) — Traditional folk song
Petya Buyuklieva and Nayden Stoyanov	"If There is No Tomorrow, There is No Today" (Ако утре няма днес) — Maria Ilieva and Miro
Orlin Pavlov and Yoanna Yovcheva	"Can You Hear Me?" (Чуваш ли ме?) — Grafa and Maria Ilieva
Other performances
Dimitar Rachkov, Andrei Arnaudov, Ivan Hristov and Maria Ignatova	"Mamma Maria" — Ricchi e Poveri
Raffi Boghosyan	"Let It Be" — The Beatles
