= Peesh ili luzhesh season 1 =

Television game show season

Peesh ili luzhesh
- Season 1
- Starring: Militsa Gladnishka; Emil Koshlukov; Aleksandra Raeva
- Hosted by: Nencho Balabanov; Maria Ignatova
- Winners: Good singers: 4 (Note: Season highlight: Rosen Belov (ep. 7) was initially a bad singer in-game before actually turning good.); Bad singers: 3
- No. of episodes: Regular: 7; Special: 1; Overall: 8

Release
- Original network: Nova
- Original release: Regular season: 3 November – 18 December 2016; Special: 31 December 2016

Season chronology
- Next → Season 2

The first season of the Bulgarian television mystery music game show Peesh ili luzhesh premiered on Nova on 3 November 2016.

== Gameplay ==
=== Format ===
According to the original South Korean rules, the guest artist must attempt to eliminate bad singers during its game phase. At the final performance, the last remaining mystery singer is revealed as either good or bad by means of a duet between them and one of the guest artists. (Note: Gameplay note: For the lip sync rounds, the "simple" variation was used on the first 3 episodes, while the "stage and studio" variation was used for the rest of season.)

The winning mystery singer, regardless of being good or bad, gets 3,000 лв and will have to perform again at the encore concert.

=== Rounds ===
1. First impression (Bulgarian: Първо впечатление)
  The guest artist is given some time to observe and examine each mystery singer based on their appearance. Afterward, a muted video of each mystery singer that reveals only 0.3 seconds of their singing voice is played as an additional hint.
2. Occupation (Bulgarian: Професия)
  The guest artist must describe one of the mystery singer's other talents, except "singing" itself. It may unrelated to the stage of truth, but it depends on their identity.
3. Lip sync (Bulgarian: Синхронизация на устните)
  - Each mystery singer performs a lip sync to a song; good singers mime to a recording of their own, while bad singers mime to a backing track by another vocalist.
  - Each mystery singer performs a lip sync on stage and studio sections through split screen.
4. Interrogation (Bulgarian: Разпит)
  The guest artist may ask questions to the remaining mystery singers. Good singers are required to give truthful responses, while the bad singers must lie.

== Episodes ==
=== Guest artists ===
Legend:
Good singer
Bad singer

Episode		Guest artist (Note: Players' notes: For the returning guest artists (who also include foreigners and former good singers), names are displayed in italics.; For the mixed groups, names who identified as bad singers are displayed in italics.)	Mystery singers (In their respective numbers)							
#	Date	Guest artist	Elimination order							Winner
#	Date	Guest artist	First impression	Occupation		Lip sync		Interrogation		Winner
1	3 November 2016	Lubo Kirov	5. Martina Zdravkova	1. Alex Pershenliev	8. Aladin Ibrahimov	6. Goran Dimitrov	7. Sofia Jamdjieva	3. Gabi Ivanova	4. Nikolay Kalchev	2. Milka Tatareva
2	10 November 2016	Lucy Diakovska (No Angels)	2. Deborah Angelova	3. Alexander Baichev	7. Maja Yordanova	1. Alexander Georgiev	5. Nikolai Bankov	8. Kristian Gudjunov	4. Teodora Ruseva	6. Denitsa Angelova
3	14 November 2016	Krisko	1. Kolo Peyev	2. Ivanina Georgieva	4. Antoni Davidov	6. Atanas Paskalev	7. Veronica Dycheva	5. Gergana Buteva	3. Galija Spasova	8. Igor Damyanov
4	21 November 2016	Veselin Marinov	6. Jennifer Benediction	4. Nikolai Nikolov	2. Stoyan Mitev	5. Delia Haralampieva	7. Dani Atanasova	5. Raya Andreeva	8. Josif Chenkov	1. Teodora Slavova
5	28 November 2016	Atanas Penev (B.T.R.)	6. Emil Evdenov	2. Ivo Kostov	7. Gloria Georgieva	3. Bistra Kosovyanova	8. Mikhail Nikolov	4. Kristina Sybaeva	5. Hristina Yurechko	1. Gabriela Daganova
6	5 December 2016	Margarita Hranova	5. Filip Donchev	2. Milena Mireva	8. Valery Stankov	3. Stefan Marinov	6. Gergana Tsankova	4. Monica Mincheva	1. Georgi Velichkov	7. Ralitsa Sokolinska
7	18 December 2016	Yordanka Hristova	7. Dmitri Pichev	8. Alexandra Kukushev	1. Anton Alexandrov	6. Hristina Pipova	2. Maria Marinova	3. Dalia Chorbadieska	5. Kristal Ilcheva	4. Rosen Belov

=== Panelists ===
Legend:
Regular panelist
Additional panelist
Guest panelist

Apps		Panelists in attendance (Sorted by first appearance, with episode designations)
g#	p#	Panelists in attendance (Sorted by first appearance, with episode designations)
7	2	Militsa Gladnishka and Emil Koshlukov (1–7)
4	1	Aleksandra Raeva (1–3, 7)
1	17	Dimitar Rachkov and Vasil Vasilev (1); Julian Konstantinov and Velizar Sokolov (2); Lucy Diakovska (No Angels) and Antoaneta Dobreva (3); Gerasim Georgiev, Krisko, and Nadia Petrova (4); Judy Halvadjian, Slavin Slavchev, and Alfredo Torres (5); Magarditch Halvadjian, Hilda Kazasyan, and Stefania Koleva (6); Margarita Hranova and Martin Zahariev (7)

== New Year's Eve Concert (31 December 2016) ==
Also in this season, a first encore concert was held on the last day of 2016, featuring some of invited guest artists and mystery singers return to perform one last time.

Peesh ili luzhesh season 1 — New Year's Eve Concert performances
With special participations of: Gala Budeva, Militsa Gladnishka, Magarditch Halvadjian, Emil Koshlukov, and Aleksandra Raeva
Performer(s)	Song(s)
Lip sync performances
Lubo Kirov and Milka Tatareva	"Nothing Compares 2 U" — Prince and Rosie Gaines
Lucy Diakovska and Denitsa Angelova	"When You Believe" — Whitney Houston and Mariah Carey
Krisko and Igor Damyanov	"New York, New York" — Luciano Pavarotti and Liza Minnelli
Veselin Marinov and Teodora Slavova	"Più Che Puoi" — Eros Ramazotti and Cher
Atanas Penev and Gabriela Daganova	"Nobody Wants To Be Lonely" — Christina Aguilera and Ricky Martin
Margarita Hranova and Ralitsa Sokolinska	"Summer Nights" — John Travolta and Olivia Newton-John
Yordanka Hristova and Rosen Belov	"No Me Ames" — Jennifer Lopez and Marc Anthony
Live duet performances
Lubo Kirov and Milka Tatareva	"I Can't Stop Loving You" — Don Gibson
Lucy Diakovska and Denitsa Angelova	"Come On!" (Ладо ле) — Tonika
Krisko and Igor Damyanov	"The Happiest Man" (Най-щастливият човек) — Grafa
Veselin Marinov and Teodora Slavova	"Stop, Next to Me" (Спри до мен) — Lea Ivanova
Atanas Penev and Gabriela Daganova	"Almost Forgotten Love" (Почти забравена любов) — Vasil Naydenov
Margarita Hranova and Ralitsa Sokolinska	"Unforgettable" (Незабрава) — Katya Filipova
Yordanka Hristova and Rosen Belov	"The World is For Two" (Светът е за двама) — Orlin Goranov
Other performances
Maria Ignatova and Nencho Balabanov	"Santa Baby" — Eartha Kitt; "Santa Claus is Coming to Town" — Mariah Carey
All guest artists and winners	"Wish" (Пожелание) — Dimitar Stanchev
