= I Can See Your Voice =

Television game show franchise

- Created by: Lee Seon-young
- Original work: I Can See Your Voice (South Korean game show)
- Owner: CJ ENM

Films and television
- Television series: I Can See Your Voice (see international versions)

Miscellaneous
- Genre: Game show
- First aired: February 26, 2015; 11 years ago

I Can See Your Voice (abbreviated as ICSYV) is a television game show franchise. Originating from the South Korean program of the same title created by television producer Lee Seon-young and produced by CJ ENM, it features a "mystery music game show" format leaning of a guessing flair, where guest artist(s) and (also include) contestant(s) attempt to eliminate bad singers from the group, until the last mystery singer remains for a duet performance.

== Background ==
In 2012, television producer Lee Seon-young initially planned to develop a singing reality competition show "involving only good singers", which she would later add unusual elements such as "bad singers", lip sync, and a "guessing game" flair, thus creating the "mystery music game show" format in the process. She also originally envisioned a program that allows anyone to be the "main character" regardless of their appearances, with Kim Bum-soo taking inspiration, who struggled to gain recognition because of his look.

I Can See Your Voice made its debut on Mnet and tvN on February 26, 2015, with host Kim Bum-soo playing the game as a guest artist. Despite the poor reception in its first season, the show went on to become an instant success in South Korea, forcing to renew for a second season.

== Gameplay ==
=== Formats ===
==== Original format ====
Over the course of several rounds, the guest artist(s) and/or contestant(s) must attempt to eliminate bad singers from a group of "mystery singers", identified only by their occupation or alias, without ever hearing them perform live. They are assisted by clues regarding the singers' backgrounds, style of performance, and observations from a celebrity panel. At the end of a game, the last remaining mystery singer is revealed as either good or bad by means of a duet between them and one of the guest artists.

==== Battle format ====
Introduced in Giọng ải giọng ai, the format features two opposing guest artists eliminate one singer each during the proper game phase, and then keep one singer each to join the final performance. The winner is determined by the remaining mystery singers, who are chosen by opposing guest artists, as per specific winning condition depends on the outcome of their final performance, if:

1. One opposing guest artist kept a good singer and the other had a bad singer, or
2. Both opposing guest artists kept good or bad singers.

For Veo cómo cantas in Mexico, two opposing contestants must eliminate one mystery singer from an assigned group. At the end of first two or three rounds, the contestant having of a least one or two bad singer eliminations will proceed to the next round.

==== Invasion format ====
Introduced in Catch Me If You Can as a variation of the "battle format", the game begins with a lip sync phase, where a team of guest artists (known as "stars") attempt to identify good and bad singers through batches of mystery singers (known as "invaders"); if the guest artists guessed the mystery singer right, they get points per batch, otherwise the mystery singers did the same points have if they guessed wrong. After that, the highest-scoring team or both of two (when the first phase ends in a tie) must identify if a "surprise" player is good or bad. The winning team is determined on two different conclusions:

1. If either guest artists or mystery singers guessed the "surprise" player right, they win a prize money; if either guessed them wrong, that money is given to the opposing team.
2. If both guest artists and mystery singers guessed the "surprise" player right, that prize money is split into two teams.

Imghere, another Georgian adaptation, has a shorter game with reduced lineup (and batches) of mystery singers, as the game concludes with simply based on the final score between two opposing teams.

=== Players ===
The game's main element, "mystery singers", are a lineup of selections catered to guest artist(s) that divide into uncertain number of good and bad singers. (Note: The number of mystery singers in a lineup may vary depending on the game's duration, with a minimum of five people setting in the Philippine counterpart.) Actually, the winning mystery singer can perform freely without accompanying guest artist(s). Aside from that, it also includes civilian or celebrity contestants, taking the role of "eliminators". Some lineup variations include:

- Mixed groups, if all mystery singers are good but to include of at least one bad singer, redesignating them as "bad".
- The "surprise" entrant, when a mystery singer stands inside an enclosure and remain concealed until its revelation by being eliminated or a final performance by one of the guest artists.

=== Rewards ===
Throughout the game, mystery singers, contestants, and to lesser extent guest artists have given rewards such as prize money, trophy, or recording contract. Some commonly used methods include:

- The eliminated or winning mystery singer, regardless of being good or bad, gets a cash prize. With contestant(s) involved, they get a cash prize if the last remaining mystery singer is good, or to the winning bad singer selected by them.
- The contestant(s) must eliminate one mystery singer at the end of each round, receiving a petty cash if they eliminate a bad singer. At the end of a game, if the contestant(s) decide(s) to walk away, they will keep the money had won in previous rounds; if they decide to risk for the last remaining mystery singer, they win its main prize if a singer is good, or lose their all winnings if a singer is bad.

=== Rounds ===
For its game phase, mystery singers must examine for legitimacy through different rounds with varying mechanics.

==== Visual round ====
The guest artist(s) and contestant(s) is/are given some time to observe and examine each mystery singer based on their appearance. Additional hints may also include a muted video of mystery singer that plays a short duration of their singing voice; or a mystery singer giving two different identities, with one of them is real.

==== Lip sync round ====
Each mystery singer performs a lip sync to a song; good singers mime to a recording of their own, while bad singers mime to a backing track by another vocalist. In other cases, good and bad singers' recordings can play alternately in the middle of the performance. This is also done through pairs and batches, where the guest artist(s) and contestant(s) eliminate one mystery singer from each group.

==== Evidence round ====
Each mystery singer reveals an evidential piece. Good singers have own evidences, while bad singers had their evidences fabricated. Guest artist(s) and contestant(s) may also contain additional clues by one of the mystery singers, including own "stuffs", statements by "witnesses", or a video package (such as "house tour" or "personal life" presentations).

==== Rehearsal round ====
Each mystery singer reveals a pre-show rehearsal piece. Guest artist(s) and contestant(s) can be typically presented with video from a recording session by one of the mystery singers, but pitch-shifted to obscure the actual vocals.

This round has also another method, where randomly selected panelists are wearing headphones to listen to a recording of assigned mystery singer for a short duration. Afterward, the panelist defends the mystery singer and convince the guest artist(s) and contestant(s) to choose them for a final performance.

==== Interrogation round ====
The guest artist(s) and contestant(s) may ask questions to the remaining mystery singers. Good singers are required to give truthful responses, while the bad singers must lie. Also, the mystery singer may confess what kind of identity they have it the singer is bad.

=== In-game variations ===
The American second season introduced the use of Golden Mic, in which the guest artist(s) and contestant(s) may hear additional clues and observations to mystery singers from celebrity guest(s) off-stage.

Introduced in third season of Peesh ili luzhesh, the Golden Switch can be used during the proper game phase to apply one randomly-selected mystery singer as an additional hint. However, the guest artist(s) can still able to eliminate that, even if they are revealed as good or bad.

== Reception ==
=== Legacy ===
I Can See Your Voice can be preferred as a "game show alternative", unlike the existing reality competition programs such as Idol, Rising Star, The Voice, or The X Factor. The program also serves as a "stepping stone" for participants to perform effortlessly, describing it as the "second coming of National Singing Contest", specifically due to significant impacts on their careers, as well as its contribution to the local music industry. Certain mystery singers such as Hwang Chi-yeul and Samantha Irvin went on to have successful careers, while others like Lee Sun-bin, Kim Min-kyu, Ninety One, and Black Pearl also performed there, despite having already established their careers earlier.

=== Concerns and controversies ===
==== Plagiarism ====
According to TV Report in August 2015, CJ ENM was suspected of plagiarism on two Chinese programs, God of Singing by Shenzhen TV and X-Singer by Beijing TV, as they both implemented on "modified" game mechanics strikingly similar to I Can See Your Voice, without granting permission from the said company. One unnamed employee also stated in a phone call that they did not emulate the original South Korean program, proving both broadcasters had acquired rights to produce local adaptations, likely of Is That Really Your Voice?, another game show format created by the Turkey-based Global Agency in 2013; as a follow-up, CJ ENM would immediately enforce countermeasures to avoid such future occurrences. FormatBiz later revealed in an interview by CJ ENM's head of formats Diane Min in June 2020 that there was also a dispute of its own with the latter, in which I Can See Your Voice was accused as being plagiarized from their format.

In a similar case published by the Korean Foundation for International Cultural Exchange Berlin correspondent Lee Yu-jin for Korea Creative Content Agency in July 2021, CJ ENM had been also suspected on a then-upcoming ProSieben program FameMaker, citing its comparisons to I Can See Your Voice in terms of format elements, that was noticed on his deleted tweet by Oliver Pocher. Production company Brainpool TV and producer Stefan Raab were also concerned of the issue, describing their show was an original concept, which is leaning on The Voice-styled competitive approach with singers performing inside a soundproof dome. Later, an RTL Deutschland spokeswoman formally responded in an interview from Focus that both two programs have "good and bad singer" elements, but they were different formats; she had also initially refused to comment about ProSieben's attempt to acquire rights for another South Korean program as it succeeded in The Masked Singer.

==== Gameplay issues ====
An example of intentional cheating in-game occurred in the second season episode of Peesh ili luzhesh on November 24, 2024, when Orlin Goranov committed to remain with good singer Beatris, Judy Halvadjian's daughter, as the winner. Prior to that game, they were previously performed during BNT's Christmas Matinee concert in 2023.

In the third season episode of Sedato on April 14, 2025, contestant Akhil Royinbagh went to eliminate five good singers, leaving with sole bad singer Amir Fadajan as the winner for a duet performance by returning guest artist Amir Mohammed Kamirpour; this result caused a flaw in its gameplay, where the Iranian counterpart implements the American-modified original format for the entire season.

=== Accolades ===
I Can See Your Voice has been nominated at the 44th International Emmy Awards for Best Non-Scripted Entertainment Program, 2020 Venice TV Awards for Best Light Entertainment Program, and 2023 Rose d'Or for Studio Entertainment Award.

== International versions ==
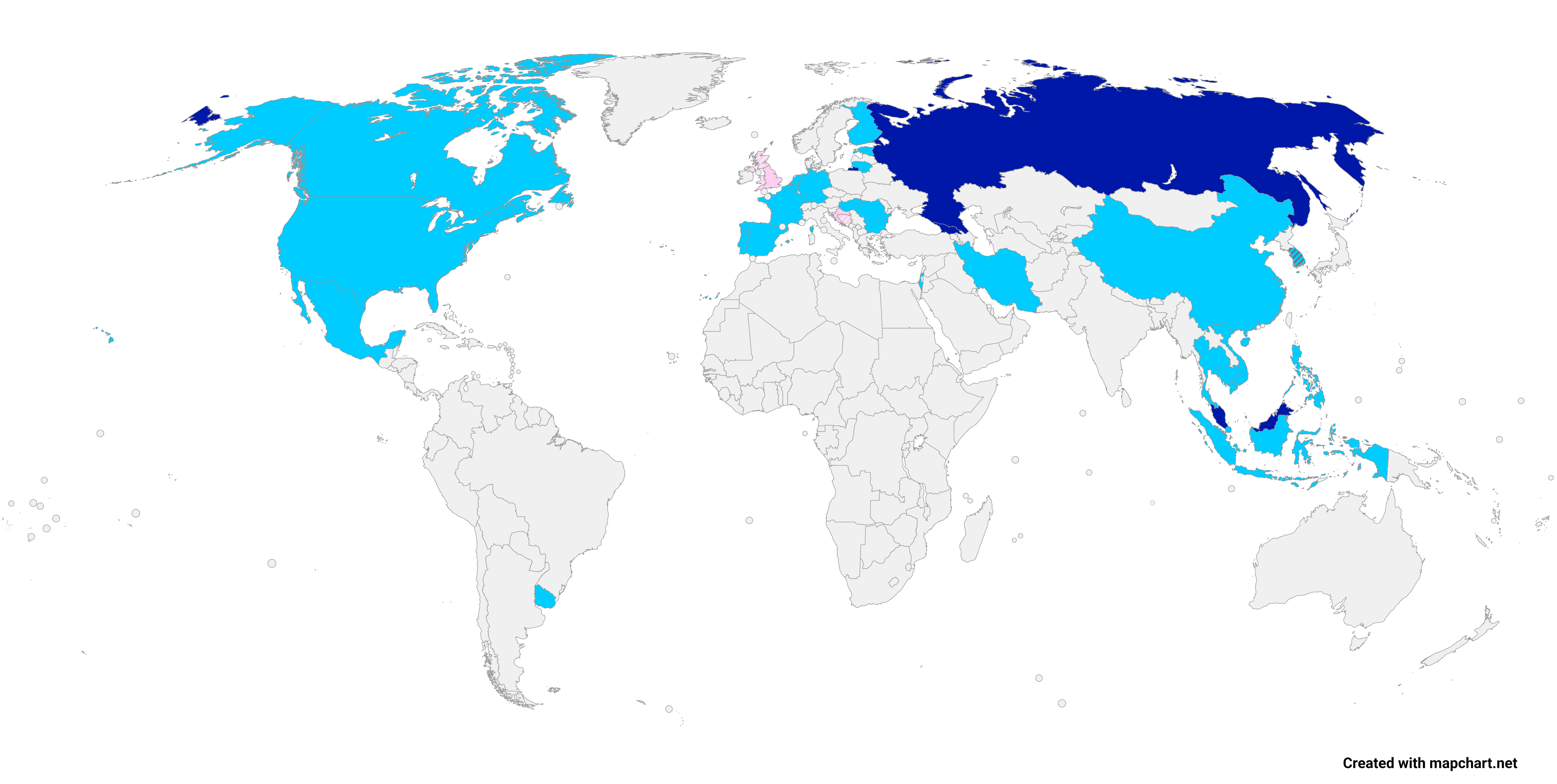
I Can See Your Voice franchise locations: Original South Korean program With a single adaptation of its own With multiple adaptations of its own With a single adaptation organized by multiple countries or territories

I Can See Your Voice commenced franchising in June 2015, when CJ ENM made a joint agreement with Jiangsu Broadcasting Corporation of China to acquire the rights for producing its first locally licensed adaptation. On the other hand, Thailand became the first country to air its own local adaptation, debuting on January 13, 2016. Since then, the ICSYV franchise has produced 33 adaptations, airing in 31 countries and territories.

Aside from licensed ones, other programs have been also contributed to existing I Can See Your Voice counterparts, technically resulting in their inclusions to the franchise. Giọng ải giọng ai (the Vietnamese adaptation) introduces the "battle format", which was later used by Catch Me If You Can (the unofficial adaptation of Ya vizhu tvoy golos in Russia) with an "invasion" variant, and then adapted on Imghere (the same designation as Gvachvene sheni khma in Georgia).

=== Overview ===
Designations:
Program status —: active; inactive; upcoming
Program type —: ◆ originating; ◆ technically included; ◆ unofficial
Game format —: OG original; VS battle; INV invasion; Cont with contestants

Licensed adaptations
Country or region	Program title	Network(s)	Seasons		Cast	
Country or region	Program title	Network(s)	Total	Format(s) used	Host(s)	Panelists
Belgium (Dutch-language)	I Can See Your Voice	VTM	5	OG; Cont	Jonas van Geel	Vincent Fierens (s1–3); Kamal Kharmach (s1–3); Kürt Rogiers (s1–4); Ingeborg Sergeant (s1–4); Jaap Reesema (s4); Jamie-Lee Six (s4)
Bulgaria	Пееш или лъжеш Are you singing or lying?	Nova	Finished: 3 (list); Ongoing: 4	OG	Current; Dimitar Rachkov (s2–4); Former; Nencho Balabanov (s1); Maria Ignatova (s1)	Current; Aleksandra Raeva (s1, 4); Andrei Arnaudov (s2–4); Ivan Hristov (s2–4); Former; Militsa Gladnishka (s1); Emil Koshlukov (s1); Maria Ignatova (s2–3)
Cambodia	I Can See Your Voice Cambodia	Hang Meas HDTV	Finished: 3 (list); Ongoing: 4	OG	Chea Vibol (s1–4); Sok Rasy (s1–4); Pen Sreypich (s4)	Current; TBA (s4); Former; Nuon Sary (s1–2); Khat Sokhim (s1, 3); Madonna (s1, 3); Ou Bunnarat (s1–3)
Canada (French-language)	Qui sait chanter? Who can sing?	Noovo	2	OG; Cont	Phil Roy	Roxane Bruneau (s1); Rita Baga (s1–2)
China	看见你的声音; I Can See Your Voice	JSTV	1	OG	Mickey Huang; Li Hao; Shen Ling	Bai Kainan; Deon Dai; Di Yang; Ava Shen; Mix; Xu Li
Croatia with Bosnia and Herzegovina (s2) (Note: Croatia: Tko to tamo pjeva? is also aired in Bosnia and Herzegovina (s2), although it allows the guest artists from countries that had been part of the former Yugoslavia as foreigners to play there.)	Tko to tamo pjeva? Who's singin' over there?	Current; Nova TV (HRV; s1–3); Former; Nova BH (BIH; s2)	Finished: 2; Ongoing: 3	OG; Cont	Frano Ridjan	Gianna Apostolski; Luka Nižetić; Goran Vinčić; Alka Vuica
Estonia	Ma näen su häält I Can See Your Voice	Kanal 2	6 (list)	OG; Cont	Piret Laos (s1–4, 6); Evelin Võigemast (s5)	9: Grete Kuld (s1–3); Andrei Zevakin (s1–3); Estoni Kohver (5miinust) (s1, 3–4); Mart Juur (s1, 5–6); Evelin Võigemast (s1–4, 6); Tõnis Niinemets (s2, 4–6); Kristel Aaslaid (s4–5); Korea (5miinust) (s5–6); Eleryn Tiit (s5–6)
Finland	Mysteerilaulajat; Mystery singers	Nelonen	1	OG; Cont	Heikki Paasonen	Robin Packalen; Miitta Sorvali
France (Note: France: Despite being advertised from 1st to 3rd season, Show Me Your Voice actually airs occasional "test runs" instead.)	Show Me Your Voice	M6 (eps. 1–4); W9 (ep. 5)	5 eps	OG; Cont	Issa Doumbia (eps. 1–5); Élodie Gossuin (eps. 3–5)	×
Georgia	გვაჩვენე შენი ხმა Show us your voice!	Rustavi 2	2 (list)	OG; Cont	Tika Patsatsia	7: Paata Guliashvili (s1); Avto Gvasalia (s1); Salome Bakuradze (s1–2); Gigi Dedalamazishvili (Mgzavrebi) (s1–2); Oto Nemsadze (s1–2); Tamar Pkhakadze (s1–2); Archil Sologashvili (s1–2)
Germany	I Can See Your Voice (s1–2) Zeig uns Deine Stimme! Show us your voice! (s3)	RTL	3	OG; Cont	Daniel Hartwich	Evelyn Burdecki (s1); Judith Rakers (s1); Thomas Hermanns (s1–2); Tim Mälzer (s1–2); Jorge González (s1, 3)
Hungary	Mutasd a hangod! Show me your voice!	TV2	2	OG; Cont	András Stohl	Bea Hargitai; Szabi Papp; Ferenc Rákóczi
Indonesia	I Can See Your Voice Indonesia	MNCTV	5 (list)	OG (s1–5); VS (s3)	Raffi Ahmad (s1–3, 5); Indra Herlambang (s1–5); Andhika Pratama (s4)	11: Julia Perez (s1); Zaskia Gotik (s1); Ayu Ting Ting (s1–3); Lee Jeong-hoon (s1–4); Wendy Armoko (s1–5); Vega Darwanti (s1–5); Anwar Sanjaya (s3); Chika Jessica (s4); Vicky Nitinegoro (s4); Ivan Gunawan (s5); Okky Lukman (s5)
Iran	صداتو; Your voice	Filimo	Finished: 3 (list); Upcoming: 4 (on hold)	OG; Cont	Current; TBA (s4); Former; Mohsen Kiaei (s1–2); Siamak Ansari (s3)	Current; TBA (s4); Former; Mohammad Bahrani (s1–2); Shabnam Moghaddami (s1–2); Amir Mahdi Jule (s1–3); Mohsen Sharifian (s1–3); Elika Abdolrazzaghi (s3); Mohammad Alizadeh (s3)
Israel	רואים את הקול; I see a voice	Keshet 12	2	OG	Erez Tal	Ilanit Levi; Shiri Maimon; Avi Nussbaum; Ido Rosenblum
Lithuania	Aš matau tavo balsą I Can See Your Voice	LNK; BTV	1	OG; Cont	Rokas Bernatonis	Monika Liu; Karolina Meschino
Malaysia (Chinese-language)	看见你的声音; I Can See Your Voice Malaysia	8TV	2	OG	Wong Yinyin (s1); Wind Lee (s1–2); Xiaoyu (s1–2)	Rickman Chia (s1–2); Orange Tan (s1–2); Hoon Mei Sim (s2); Gary Yap (s2)
Malaysia (Malay-language)	I Can See Your Voice Malaysia	Current; TV3 (s2–8); Former; NTV7 (s1)	Finished: 7 (list); Upcoming: 8 (audition phase)	OG	Current; TBA (s8); Former; Alvin Chong (s1); Shuk Sahar (s1–4); Sean Lee (s2–4); Ain Edruce (s5); Izzue Islam (s5–7); Shiha Zikir (s6–7)	16: Current; TBA (s8); Former; Seelan Paul (s1–2); Mark Adam (s1–3); Jihan Muse (s1–4, 6); Yusry Abdul Halim (KRU) (s3); Fad Bocey (s4); Alif Satar (s4); Andi Bernadee (s5); Janna Nick (s5); Rosyam Nor (s5); Khir Rahman (s6); Baby Shima (s6); Ropie Cecupak (s6); Siti Khadijah Halim (s7); Naim Daniel (s7); Bell Ngasri (s7); Riena Diana (s7)
Mexico (Note: Mexico: Veo cómo cantas began airing first on the American Spanish-language network Univision, followed by its Mexican airing debut on Las Estrellas.)	Veo cómo cantas I see how you sing	Las Estrellas (MEX); Univision (USA)	1	OG; VS (pt); Cont	Omar Pérez Reyes	Erika Buenfil; Beto Cuevas (La Ley); José Eduardo Derbez; Natalia Téllez
Netherlands	I Can See Your Voice	RTL 4	5	OG; Cont	Carlo Boszhard	7: Ronnie Flex (s1); Samantha Steenwijk (s1); Jeroen van Koningsbrugge (s1); Marieke Elsinga (s1–5); Fred van Leer (s1–5); Edsilia Rombley (s2–4); Danny de Munk (s2–3, 5)
Philippines (Note: Philippines: Following the second broadcast shutdown of ABS-CBN, I Can See Your Voice moved to Kapamilya Channel (s3–5), along with simulcasts on A2Z (s3–5) and TV5 (s5).)	I Can See Your Voice	ABS-CBN (s1–2); Kapamilya Channel (s3–5); A2Z (s3–5); TV5 (s5)	5 (list)	OG	Luis Manzano	19: Wacky Kiray (s1–2); Kean Cipriano (s1–2); Alex Gonzaga (s1–2); Andrew E. (s1–3); KaladKaren (s1–3); Bayani Agbayani (s1–2, 5); Angeline Quinto (s1–5); Jobert Austria (s2); Jona Viray (s3); Nikko Natividad (s3–4); Long Mejia (s3, 5); Negi (s3–5); Ruffa Gutierrez (s4); MC Muah (s4–5); Lassy (s4–5); Chad Kinis (s5); Jennica Garcia (s5); Divine Tetay (s5); Alora Sasam (s5)
Portugal	Cantor ou Impostor? Singer or impostor?	SIC	Finished: 1; Upcoming: 2 (renewed)	OG; Cont	Current; TBA (s2); Former; Cláudia Vieira	Current; TBA (s2); Former; João Manzarra; Débora Monteiro; Rui Unas
Romania	Falsez pentru tine I'm pretending to sing for you	Pro TV	1	OG	Mihai Bobonete	Gojira; Răzvan Fodor; Monica Anghel; Anna Lesko
Russia	Я вижу твой голос I Can See Your Voice	Rossiya-1	1	OG; Cont	Vladimir Markony	Nikolai Fomenko; Larisa Rubalskaya; Olga Shelest; ST
Singapore (English-language)	I Can See Your Voice Singapore	Channel 5	1	OG	Munah Bagharib; Joakim Gomez	Najip Ali; Gurmit Singh
South Korea	I Can See Your Voice^{◆} 너의 목소리가 보여	Mnet; tvN	10 (list)	OG	Kim Bum-soo (s1–3); Leeteuk (Super Junior) (s1–10); Yoo Se-yoon (s1–10); Kim Jong-kook (s4–10)	24: Julian Quintart (s1); Yoon Sung-ho (s1); Ben (s1–2); Hwang Chi-yeul (s1, 10); Kim Sang-hyuk (Click-B) (s1–10); Park Hwi-soon (s2); Han Hee-jun (s2–3); Lee Sang-min (s2–8); Jang Do-yeon (s3–5); Shindong (Super Junior) (s4–5); Joon Park (g.o.d) (s4–7); Jang Dong-min (s6); DinDin (s6–7); Sleepy (Untouchable) (s7); Hong Yoon-hwa (s7–8); Jang Wooyoung (2PM) (s8); Kim Ji-sook (s8); Mijoo (Lovelyz) (s8); Heo Kyung-hwan (s8–9); Hanhae (s8–9); Eun Ji-won (Sechs Kies) (s9); Kim Na-young (s9); Park Myung-soo (s10); Jonathan Yiombi (s10)
Spain	Veo cómo cantas I see how you sing	Antena 3	2	OG; Cont	Manel Fuentes	Ana Milán (s1); El Monaguillo (s1–2); Josie Gallego (s1–2); Ruth Lorenzo (s1–2)
Thailand	I Can See Your Voice Thailand	Workpoint TV	6 (list)	OG (s1–6); VS (s3–4)	Somkiat Chanpram; Kan Kantathavorn	19: Thanawat Prasitsomporn (s1–2); Nilubon Amonwitthawat (s1–4); Jakkawal Saothongyuttitum (s1–4); Maneenuch Smerasut (s1–5); Nalin Hohler (s1, 6); Nattapong Chatipong (s2); Chirasak Panphum (s2); Techin Ploypetch (s2–3); Kapol Thongplub (s2–3); Kiattisak Udomnak (s2–3); Darunee Sutiphitak (s2–4, 6); Nachat Janthapan (s3); Chaleumpol Tikumpornteerawong (s3); Saranyu Winaipanit (s3); Chinawut Indracusin (s3–4); Mongkol Sa-ardboonyaphat (s3–4); Tachakorn Boonlupyanun (s4); Panupan Jantanawong (s4); Warawut Poyim (s6)
United Kingdom	I Can See Your Voice	BBC One	2	OG; Cont	Paddy McGuinness	Jimmy Carr; Alison Hammond; Amanda Holden
United States	I Can See Your Voice	Fox	Finished: 3 (list); Upcoming: 4 (renewed)	OG; Cont	Current; TBA (s4); Former; Ken Jeong	Current; TBA (s4); Former; Adrienne Bailon-Houghton; Cheryl Hines
Uruguay	Veo cómo cantas I see how you sing	Teledoce	1	OG; Cont	Lucía Rodríguez	Pampita Ardohaín; Manuela da Silveira; Annasofía Facello; Martín Inthamoussú

Related programs
Country or region	Program title	Network(s)	Seasons		Cast	
Country or region	Program title	Network(s)	Total	Format(s) used	Host(s)	Panelists
Georgia	იმღერე^{◆◆} Sing it!	Rustavi 2	Ongoing: 1	INV	Tika Patsatsia	Salome Bakuradze; Tamar Pkhakadze; Archil Sologashvili
Russia	Поймай меня, если сможешь^{◆◆} Catch Me If You Can	Rossiya-1	3	INV	Vladimir Markony	×
Vietnam	Giọng ải giọng ai^{◆} Hidden voices	HTV7	5 (list)	VS	Đại Nghĩa	Ốc Thanh Vân (s1–2); Thu Trang (s1–2); Trấn Thành (s1–5); Trường Giang (s1–5)

=== Pending adaptations ===
Apart from existing ones, 14 other countries have confirmed their intention to produce local adaptations of I Can See Your Voice:

- Slovakia and Czech Republic — Slovakia first reported as one of provisional countries for a local adaptation of I Can See Your Voice by The Korea Economic Daily in December 2018, and then a press release by CJ ENM in March 2019; Czech Republic would also follow suit, as both countries signed into a co-deal between CJ ENM and Fremantle in November 2020.
- Australia and Italy — Both countries were provisionally included through a press release by CJ ENM in December 2019.
- Poland and Turkey — Both countries were provisionally included, according to a report by El Español in October 2020.
  - Poland was one of the countries to have sign a co-deal between CJ ENM and Fremantle in November 2020. WPtv did also air the American counterpart under its title, Śpiewają, czy udają? (lit. 'Are they singing or pretending?').
  - In April 2021, Acun Medya formally acquired the rights to produce a Turkish adaptation of I Can See Your Voice as part of dealing with Eccho Rights in April 2021; TV8 is assigned to air under its tentative title, Sesini görebiliyorum.
- India and Norway — Both countries signed a co-deal between CJ ENM and Fremantle in November 2020.
- Greece — According to report by Grigoris Melas of NewsIt on August 20, 2021, Alter Ego Media formally acquired the rights to produce a Greek adaptation of I Can See Your Voice, with Silverline Media assigning on production duties; Mega Channel is assigned to air under its tentative title, Boró na do ti foní sou (Greek: Μπορώ να δω τη φωνή σου), with Maria Mpekatorou as host.
- Serbia — In September 2021, Videostroj initially planned to produce a multinational adaptation of I Can See Your Voice consisting of all countries from the former Yugoslavia, with Una TV assigning as the broadcaster prior to its launch on 21 December 2021. Amidst the U.S. sanctions linked to then-president of Republika Srpska Milorad Dodik, Una TV eventually ceased operations in July 2024 for Bosnia and Herzegovina, Montenegro, North Macedonia, and Croatia (the latter would produce Tko to tamo pjeva?). Except for its Serbian counterpart (co-managed by Srđan Praštalo and Aleksandar Radoš), there is a possibility that they will produce the sole adaptation.
- Ukraine — In February 2022, a post from Novyi Kanal's official Instagram page announced the auditions for a provisional Ukrainian adaptation of I Can See Your Voice.
- Colombia — The country was provisionally included, according to a report by iMBC eNews in February 2023.
- Japan — The country was provisionally included through a press release by CJ ENM in April 2023; Mnet Japan's website did also have a translated title of I Can See Your Voice (Japanese: 君の声が見える, Hepburn: Kimi no koe ga mieru).
- Brazil — The country was provisionally included, according to a report by El País in February 2024, as being related to the Uruguayan counterpart of Veo cómo cantas.
