= Peesh ili luzhesh season 2 =

Television game show season

Peesh ili luzhesh
- Season 2
- Starring: Andrei Arnaudov; Ivan Hristov; Maria Ignatova
- Hosted by: Dimitar Rachkov
- Winners: Good singers: 6 (Note: Season highlights: Dimitar Shutev (ep. 7) and Peteo Nguyen (ep. 10) were initially bad singers in-game before actually turning good.; In addition to Galena and good singer Mario Todorov (ep. 2), Miro was also absent, which subsequently replaced by Raffi Boghosyan as a partner of good singer Nadia Kazakova (ep. 5).); Bad singers: 4
- No. of episodes: Regular: 10; Special: 1; Overall: 11

Release
- Original network: Nova
- Original release: Regular season: 22 September – 8 December 2024; Special: 31 December 2024

Season chronology
- ← Previous; Season 1 Next → Season 3

The second season of the Bulgarian television mystery music game show Peesh ili luzhesh premiered on Nova on 22 September 2024. As part of Nova's 30th anniversary programming lineup that formally announced during the 12th season finale of Kato dve kapki voda in May 2024, this season also marked a revival for the series after an eight-year hiatus.

== Gameplay ==
=== Format ===
According to the original South Korean rules, the guest artist must attempt to eliminate bad singers during its game phase. At the final performance, the last remaining mystery singer is revealed as either good or bad by means of a duet between them and one of the guest artists. (Note: Gameplay note: The number of mystery singers are set to six, seven, or eight.)

The winning mystery singer, regardless of being good or bad, gets 5,000 лв and will have to perform again at the encore concert.

=== Rounds ===
1. First impression (Bulgarian: Първо впечатление)
  The guest artist is given some time to observe and examine each mystery singer based on their appearance. Afterward, a muted video of each mystery singer that reveals only 0.3 seconds of their singing voice is played as an additional hint.
2. Introduction (Bulgarian: Представяне)
  Each mystery singer self-introduces to guest artist and panelists. Good singers are telling the truth, while bad singers are allowed to lie.
3. Lip sync (Bulgarian: Синхронизация на устните)
  Each mystery singer performs a lip sync to a song; good singers mime to a recording of their own, while bad singers mime to a backing track by another vocalist.
4. Interrogation (Bulgarian: Разпит)
  The guest artist may ask questions to the remaining mystery singers. Good singers are required to give truthful responses, while the bad singers must lie.

== Episodes ==
=== Guest artists ===
Legend:
Good singer
Bad singer

Episode		Guest artist (Note: Players' notes: For the returning guest artists (who also include foreigners and former good singers), names are displayed in italics.; For the mixed groups, names who identified as bad singers are displayed in italics.)	Mystery singers (In their respective numbers)							
#	Date	Guest artist	Elimination order							Winner
#	Date	Guest artist	First impression	Introduction		Lip sync		Interrogation		Winner
1	22 September 2024	Veselin Marinov	4. Kristina Georgieva	5. Yana Tacheva		2. Julia Yakimova	6. Antoaneta Angelova	3. Jessica Georgieva	1. Ivailo Irinkov	7. Valeria and Viktoria Topalski
2	29 September 2024	Galena	2. Veronica Kirova	5. Daniela Koseva		6. Georgi Rupchin		4. Krasimir Keumurkov	3. Juli Simeonova	1. Mario Todorov
3	6 October 2024	Toni Dimitrova	2. Darina Ivanova	1. Dejan Vlaikov		3. Emil Boichev	5. Siana Angelova	7. Emanuela Meloyan	6. Ivan Nedyalkov	4. Kristina Lilkova
4	13 October 2024	Konstantin	2. Gani Mitev	1. Kristian Jankulov	7. Barbara Peychinova	5. Tsveta Yancheva	8. Velichka Dimitrova	6. Veselina Boneva	4. Natali Stefanova	3. Lora Alexandrova
5	20 October 2024	Miro	2. Vladislava Popova	1. Rumiana Koleva	7. Vanya Tsolova	4. Ralitsa Stefanova	5. Kamelia Atanasova	6. Preslava Georgieva	3. Georgi Iliev	8. Nadia Kazakova
Season break: 27 October episode was pre-empted to give way for this year's snap parliamentary election held in the same month.
6	3 November 2024	Doni	1. Milen Malchev	2. Megi Gocheva	4. Bojan Todorov	3. Julia Stanoeva	6. Vanessa Karpacheva	7. Yana Marinova	5. Valentina Dimitrova	8. Eleonora Stoyanova
7	10 November 2024	Anelia	4. Elitsa Velinova	3. Boyana Vasileva	7. Gabriela Baikusheva	6. Simona Ruskova	8. Stilyana Koleva	2. Yvonne Jaheoba	5. Gergana Uzunova	1. Dimitar Shutev
8	17 November 2024	Mihaela Fileva	7. Rangel Rangelov	2. Alexandar Alexandrov		3. Maria Mihailova	6. Sashka Radeva	5. Kristian Iliev	1. Kristina Hristova	4. Galina Yaneva
9	24 November 2024	Orlin Goranov	4. Snejanka Kazandjieva	5. Alisha Pavlova	8. Iliana Alexandrova	1. Ilina Georgieva	2. Angel Vasilev	7. Marta Tsvetkova	6. Ventsislav Nikolov	3. Beatris Halvadjian
10	8 December 2024	Desi Slava	2. Sani Zaharieva	6. Gergana Stoyanova		1. Anton Ivanov	3. Tervel Ivanov	5. Shtilyan Mihailov	4. Dani Ilieva	7. Peteo Nguyen

=== Panelists ===
Legend:
Regular panelist
Guest panelist

Apps		Panelists in attendance (Sorted by first appearance, with episode designations)
g#	p#	Panelists in attendance (Sorted by first appearance, with episode designations)
10	3	Andrei Arnaudov, Ivan Hristov, and Maria Ignatova (1–10)
1	20	Magarditch Halvadjian and Natalia Simeonova (1); Romina Andonova and Bashar Rahal (2); Andrea Banda Banda and Dragomir Draganov (3); Stanimir Gumov and Dimitar Kovachev (4); Stanislava Armutlieva and Divna Stancheva (5); Djuliana Abdul-Gani and Krisko (6); Izabel Ovcharova and Borislav Zahariev (7); Judy Halvadjian and Toma Zdravkov (8); Atanas Penev (B.T.R.) and Mariana Popova (9); Darin Angelov and Gala Budeva (10)

== New Year's Eve Concert (31 December 2024) ==
Also in this season, a second encore concert was held on the last day of 2024, featuring some of invited guest artists and mystery singers return to perform one last time.

Peesh ili luzhesh season 2 — New Year's Eve Concert performances
With special participations of: Andrei Arnaudov, Magarditch Halvadjian, Ivan Hristov, Maria Ignatova, and Viktor Kalev
Performer(s)	Song(s)
Lip sync performances
Veselin Marinov and Topalski Sisters	"You Win Again" — Bee Gees
Toni Dimitrova and Kristina Lilkova	"Until Yesterday" (До вчера) — Bratya Argirovi
Konstantin and Lora Alexandrova	"Daddy Cool" — Boney M.
Raffi Boghosyan and Nadia Kazakova	"The Power" — Snap!
Doni and Eleonora Stoyanova	"Coco Jamboo" — Mr. President
Anelia and Dimitar Shutev	"Habibi de Mis Amores" — Ishtar (of Alabina) and Gipsy Kings
Mihaela Fileva and Galina Yaneva	"Beautiful Liar" — Beyoncé and Shakira
Orlin Goranov and Beatris Halvadjian	"Time to Say Goodbye" — Andrea Bocelli and Sarah Brightman
Desi Slava and Peteo Nguyen	"I Belong to You (Il Ritmo della Passione)" — Eros Ramazzotti and Anastacia
Live duet performances
Veselin Marinov and Topalski Sisters	"Stop, Next to Me" (Спри до мен) — Lea Ivanova
Toni Dimitrova and Kristina Lilkova	"If You Leave it For a Moment" (Ако ти си отидеш за миг) — Impulse
Konstantin and Lora Alexandrova	"She" (Тя) — Tram No. 5
Raffi Boghosyan and Nadia Kazakova	"Blind Day" (Сляп ден) — Signal
Doni and Eleonora Stoyanova	"Oath" (Клетва) — Shturcite
Anelia and Dimitar Shutev	"Me and You" (Аз и ти) — D2
Mihaela Fileva and Galina Yaneva	"This is My World" (Мой свят) — Sleng
Orlin Goranov and Beatris Halvadjian	"Are They Walking?" (Вървят ли двама) — Mariya Neikova
Desi Slava and Peteo Nguyen	"On the First Roosters" (По първи петли) — Vasil Naydenov
Other performances
Ivan Hristov and Andrei Arnaudov	"New Year" (Нова Година) — Vasil Naydenov and Bogdana Karadocheva
Maria Ignatova and Dimitar Rachkov	"Comment ça va" — The Shorts; cover by Stefan Danailov and Véronique Jannot
All guest artists and winners	"What an Awesome Day!" (Страхотен ден) — Various artists
