= Peesh ili luzhesh =

Bulgarian television game show

- Bulgarian: Пееш или лъжеш
- Literally: Are you singing or lying?
- Genre: Game show
- Based on: I Can See Your Voice by CJ ENM
- Written by: Ivan Angelov; Vladi Aprilov
- Directed by: Raffi Boghosyan
- Presented by: Nencho Balabanov (1); Maria Ignatova (1); Dimitar Rachkov (2–4)
- Starring: The celebrity panelists (see cast)
- Country of origin: Bulgaria
- Original language: Bulgarian
- No. of seasons: 4
- No. of episodes: Regular: 36; Special: 4; Overall: 40

Production
- Producers: Magarditch Halvadjian; Kiril Kirilov
- Editors: Mila Ivanova; Evgenia Koseva; Maria Mladenova
- Camera setup: Multi-camera
- Production company: Global Films

Original release
- Network: Nova
- Release: 3 November – 31 December 2016
- Release: 22 September 2024 – present

Related
- I Can See Your Voice franchise

Peesh ili luzhesh (Bulgarian: Пееш или лъжеш) is a Bulgarian television mystery music game show based on the South Korean programme I Can See Your Voice, featuring its format where guest artist(s) attempt to eliminate bad singers from the group, until the last mystery singer remains for a duet performance. It first aired on Nova on 3 November 2016.

== Gameplay ==
=== Format ===
Over the course of four rounds, the guest artist(s) must attempt to eliminate bad singers from a group of "mystery singers", identified only by their occupation or alias, without ever hearing them perform live. They are assisted by clues regarding the singers' backgrounds, style of performance, and observations from a celebrity panel. At the end of a game, the last remaining mystery singer is revealed as either good or bad by means of a duet between them and one of the guest artists. (Note: Gameplay notes: The number of mystery singers are set to six (for the 2nd season), seven (from 2nd to 3rd season) or eight (from 1st to 3rd season).; The winning good or bad singer gets a cash prize of 3,000 лв (for the 1st season), 5,000 лв (from 2nd to 3rd season), or €3,000 (for the 4th season).)

The series has an in-game variation called the Golden Switch (Bulgarian: Златен шалтер), which can be used with different functions:

- From the third to fourth season, the Golden Switch can be used during the proper game phase to apply one randomly-selected mystery singer as an additional hint. However, the guest artist(s) can still able to eliminate that, even if they are revealed as good or bad.
- For the fourth season (kids special only), each mystery singer must use the Golden Switch to randomly select a singing partner to perform with.

The winning mystery singer, regardless of being good or bad, gets a cash prize and will have to perform again at the encore concert.

=== Rounds ===
==== Visual rounds ====
- First impression (Bulgarian: Първо впечатление)

s1–4: The guest artist is given some time to observe and examine each mystery singer based on their appearance.

- Listen to my voice (Bulgarian: Чуй гласът ми)

s3–4: A muted video of each mystery singer that reveals only 0.3 seconds of their singing voice is played as an additional hint.

==== Introduction round ====
- Introduction (Bulgarian: Представяне)

s2–4: Each mystery singer self-introduces to guest artist and panelists. Good singers are telling the truth, while bad singers are allowed to lie.

==== Talent round ====
- Occupation (Bulgarian: Професия)

s1: The guest artist must describe one of the mystery singer's other talents, except "singing" itself. It may unrelated to the stage of truth, but it depends on their identity.

==== Lip sync rounds ====
- Lip sync (Bulgarian: Синхронизация на устните)
  - s1: Each mystery singer performs a lip sync on stage and studio sections through split screen.
  - s1–4: Each mystery singer performs a lip sync to a song; good singers mime to a recording of their own, while bad singers mime to a backing track by another vocalist.

==== Interrogation round ====
- Interrogation (Bulgarian: Разпит)

s1–4: The guest artist may ask questions to the remaining mystery singers. Good singers are required to give truthful responses, while the bad singers must lie.

== Production ==
Following Shine France's initial interest to locally adapt I Can See Your Voice in September 2015, BNT News reported that other European countries should consider adapting the said programme, at the time when (South Korean) second season of the same title premiered on 22 October 2015; this was formally acquired by Nova Broadcasting Group of Bulgaria in August 2016, with Global Films assigning on production duties.

== Broadcast history ==
Peesh ili luzhesh debuted on 3 November 2016.

As part of Nova's 30th anniversary programming lineup occurring at the 12th season finale of Kato dve kapki voda in May 2024, the said network formally announced that the series would revive after an eight-year hiatus, with a second season premiering on 22 September 2024.

While the second season broadcasts still ongoing, director Raffi Boghosyan has already announced the series' renewal and subsequent auditions for a then-upcoming third season during his interview at Na Kafe in November 2024, which began airing on 28 September 2025.

In April 2026, Nova formally announced that the series has renewed for a fourth season. Initially reported by Serialite NOW.bg in 15 August 2026, the season began airing with a kids special on 20 September 2026 (making it the first game in ICSYV franchise through live broadcast, as well as the inclusion of a sign language interpreter), and then continuing with regular episodes the following week. (Note: Highlight: The 4th season's kids special (under collaboration by UNICEF for charitable reasons) featured guest artists Fiki, Toni Dimitrova, Desi Slava, Galena, Miro, Veselin Marinov, Mihaela Marinova, and Orlin Pavlov performing with designated mystery singers in-game; without guest artist(s), public voting is also conducted for the winning pair instead.)

For four seasons, a series of encore concerts were held every last day of the year, featuring some of invited guest artists and mystery singers return to perform one last time.

== Cast ==
The series employs a panel of celebrity "detectives" who assist the guest artists in identifying good and bad mystery singers throughout the game. Along with regular members, guest panelists also appear since the first season. Overall, six celebrities have served as panelists, with their original lineup consisting of Militsa Gladnishka, Emil Koshlukov, and Aleksandra Raeva. Later members who joined the group's duties also include Andrei Arnaudov, Ivan Hristov, and Maria Ignatova — from the 2nd season.

Designations:
Main cast member	H Hosting duties
Additional cast member	g# Total games attended, by panelists

Cast member	Seasons			
Cast member	1	2	3	4
Nencho Balabanov	H			
Maria Ignatova	H	10	12	
Militsa Gladnishka	7			
Emil Koshlukov	7			
Aleksandra Raeva	4			6
Dimitar Rachkov		H	H	H
Andrei Arnaudov		10	12	8
Ivan Hristov		10	12	8

== Series overview ==
Series	Episodes	Originally released		Good singers	Bad singers
Series	Episodes	First released	Last released	Good singers	Bad singers
1	7	3 November 2016	18 December 2016	4	3
2	10	22 September 2024	8 December 2024	6	4
3	12	28 September 2025	14 December 2025	7	5
4	7	27 September 2026	present	3	4
Sp	4	31 December 2016	20 September 2026	1	0
