= Gospodari Na Efira =

Bulgarian television show

- Also known as: Lords of the Air
- Bulgarian: Господари на ефира
- Starring: Dimitar Rachkov; Maria Ignatova; Vasil Vasilev; Rumen Ugrinski; Malin Krastev; Gerasim Georgiev; Nencho Balabanov
- Country of origin: Bulgaria
- Original language: Bulgarian
- No. of seasons: 16
- No. of episodes: 3165

Production
- Executive producers: Magarditch Halvadjian; Judy Halvadjian; Asen Chankov
- Production locations: Global Rent Studio Complex; Sofia, Bulgaria
- Running time: 30 minutes
- Production company: Global Frame

Original release
- Network: 7 days TV (March–June 2003) bTV (2009–2012); Nova Television (2003–2009, 2012–2018)
- Release: 31 March 2003 – 31 December 2018

Gospodari Na Efira (Lords of the Air) is the highest rated and longest running original daily comedy TV show in Bulgaria, which aired for 15 years from 2003 to 2018. The show was hosted by two presenters and together with the "Adrenaline girls", they rotate every three to four months. Some of the most beloved Bulgarian comedians have hosted the show. Apart from showing TV blunders, the show has developed a strong satire profile of the program, which is based on serious political and social issues within Bulgarian society. It is based on the Italian entertainment program Striscia la notizia.

== History ==
The show premiered on March 31, 2003, on the "7 Dni TV" channel and aired there until June 6. From November 1, 2003, to July 17, 2009, it was broadcast on NOVA. During this period, various scheduling formats were tested. In addition to 30-minute weekday episodes, the show aired exclusively on weekends with one-hour episodes from November 1, 2003, to July 11, 2004. Starting March 2, 2009, it aired at 10:30 PM.

On September 14, 2009, the show moved to bTV, where it remained until April 5, 2012. Reruns during this period were shown on bTV Comedy, with late-night reruns on bTV starting September 19, 2011. On April 6, 2012, the show, along with "Pulna Ludnitsa" was taken off the air by the bTV television network; according to the producers, this was due to attempts at censorship by the broadcaster. A dispute ensued between the production company "Global Vision" and "bTV Media Group," which escalated into litigation.

As of September 10, 2012, the shows returned to the air on NOVA following an agreement between the producers and the broadcaster. Until April 2012, it was a Bulgarian version of the Italian show "Striscia la Notizia". Upon its return to NOVA, "Gospodari na Efira" no longer followed the format of the Italian "Striscia la Notizia" (although the studio was furnished exactly like that of the Italian show). The final episode aired on December 31, 2018. In May 2019, following the show's cancellation, "Gospodari na Weba" began airing online.

== Format ==
"Gospodari na Efira" is a blend of humor, information, the raising and resolution of social issues, political satire, and self-irony.

Structurally, the program can be divided into the following main components: exposing and humorously commenting on television bloopers; analyzing and expressing a stance on current political and social issues; reports with significant public impact that expose—and sometimes succeed in resolving—specific problems; promoting cultural events (theater and film premieres, literary and music events—lasting about 2 minutes); social initiatives; and recurring segments.

== Hosts ==
Host	Years	Seasons															
Host	Years	7 dni TV/ NOVA	NOVA					bTV			NOVA						
Host	Years	1	2	3	4	5	6	7	8	9	10	11	12	13	14	15	16
Vasil Vasilev – Zueka	2003–2018	1 – 16															
Malin Krastev	2003–2018	1 – 2			4 – 5				8 – 10				12 – 15				
Dimitar Rachkov	2004–2018	1 – 16															
Georgi Mamalev	2005–2006			3													
Ruslan Maynov	2005–2007			3 – 4													
Vasil Popov	2007				4												
Dimitar Manchev	2007				4												
Valentin Tanev	2007–2010					5 – 7											
Maria Ignatova	2008–2018					5 – 16											
Rumen Ugrinski	2008–2018						6 – 7			9 – 15							
Gerasim Georgiev – Gero	2011–2018								8 – 10				12 – 13			15	
Militsa Gladnishka	2014											11					
Silvestar Silvestrov	2014											11					
Nencho Balabanov	2016–2018													13 – 16			

== Awards ==
The show gives awards to people. These are: White swallow (Бяла лястовица, Byala Lyastovica), which is given for good behaviour/actions and the Golden skunk (Златен скункс, Zlaten skunks), which is given for bad actions.

== Blocks and serials ==
- I watch and don't believe my ears (Гледам и не вярвам на ушите си, Gledam i ne vyarvam na ushite si)
- Popolina VOX
- Fast And Furious... waggons (Бързи и яростни... каруци, Barzi i yarostni... karuci)
- Bai Brother (Бай брадър)
- IzSporten svyat (IzSport world) (ИзСпортен свят) - a show for sport bloopers.
- The Great Analyzer (Великият Анализатор, Velikiyat Analizator)

== See also ==
- Nova Television (Bulgaria)
- Striscia la notizia
