= Falsez pentru tine =

Romanian television game show

- Genre: Game show
- Based on: I Can See Your Voice by CJ ENM
- Presented by: Mihai Bobonete
- Starring: Gojira; Monica Anghel; Răzvan Fodor; Anna Lesko
- Country of origin: Romania
- Original language: Romanian
- No. of episodes: 5

Production
- Executive producer: Dan Alexandrescu
- Producer: Dana Mladin
- Camera setup: Multi-camera

Original release
- Network: Pro TV
- Release: 18 July – 15 August 2020

Related
- I Can See Your Voice franchise

Falsez pentru tine (lit. 'I'm pretending to sing for you') is a Romanian television mystery music game show based on the South Korean programme I Can See Your Voice, featuring its format where a guest artist attempts to eliminate bad singers from the group, until the last mystery singer remains for a duet performance. Originally scheduled to premiere on Pro TV on 4 November 2018, it was suddenly occupied by airing of the film Parker in its timeslot instead, (Note: The show's original debut date was also postponed, because of the conflict between (host) Mihai Bobonete and his programme Las Fierbinți.) and then pushed back later to 18 July 2020.

== Gameplay ==
=== Format ===
Over the course of four rounds, the guest artist must attempt to eliminate bad singers from a group of eight "mystery singers", identified only by their occupation or alias, without ever hearing them perform live. They are assisted by clues regarding the singers' backgrounds, style of performance, and observations from a celebrity panel. At the end of a game, the last remaining mystery singer is revealed as either good or bad by means of a duet between them and one of the guest artists.

If the last remaining mystery singer is good, they are granted to release a digital single by HaHaHa Production; if a singer is bad, they win 10,000 lei.

=== Rounds ===
1. 1. Stay on the picture (Romanian: Rămâi tablou)
  The guest artist is given some time to observe and examine each mystery singer based on their appearance.
1. 2. Eyes and ears (Romanian: Ochi și urechi)
  A muted video of each mystery singer that reveals only 0.3 seconds of their singing voice is played as an additional hint.
2. You tell stories or you play the trombone (Romanian: Povestești sau trombonești)
  The guest artist is presented with a video package containing possible clues by one of the mystery singers.
3. Playback on the face (Romanian: Playback pe față)
  Each mystery singer performs a lip sync to a song; good singers mime to a recording of their own, while bad singers mime to a backing track by another vocalist.
4. Out of breath (Romanian: Pe nerăsuflate)
  The guest artist may ask questions to the remaining mystery singers. Good singers are required to give truthful responses, while the bad singers must lie.

== Production ==
Yonhap News Agency provisionally announced a Romanian adaptation of I Can See Your Voice in a lead-up to the (South Korean) fifth season of the same title in January 2018; this was subsequently confirmed by Pro TV in October 2018.

== Episodes ==
Legend:
Good singer
Bad singer

Episode		Guest artist (Note: Players' notes: For the returning guest artists (who also include foreigners and former good singers), names are displayed in italics.; For the mixed groups, names who identified as bad singers are displayed in italics.)	Mystery singers (In their respective numbers)							
#	Date	Guest artist	Elimination order							Winner
#	Date	Guest artist	Stay on the picture	Eyes and ears	You tell stories or you play the trombone	Playback on the face		Out of breath		Winner
1	18 July 2020	Damian Drăghici	1. Georghe Claudiu	5. Bogdan Savin	3. Eduard Leonte	8. Lucian Pinta	2. Claudia Negroiu	4. Angela Bîtlan	6. Geanina Voicu	7. Mirela Bobe
2	25 July 2020	Mihai Mărgineanu	1. Sergiu Bolotă	4. Joe Hasabella	6. Irinel Pană	5. Maria Crăciun	7. Mirela Didei	3. Laura Anton	8. Georgiana Dănilă	2. Nicoleta Roman
3	1 August 2020	Loredana Groza	1. Cătălin Voicilă	3. (Germany) Lior Bebera	4. Mihaela Gheorgiță	7. Angela Bilișică	6. Răzvan Crețu	5. Meda Topîrceanu	2. Ancuța Moraru	8. Eduard Trică
4	8 August 2020	Fuego	8. Dorin Duca	4. Simona Bucur	1. Adrian Căpitănescu	3. Silviu Neagoe	7. Anna Ciulpan	6. Ioana Maria Filimon	3. Beatrice Căpitănescu	5. Bianca Purcărea
5	15 August 2020	Antonia Iacobescu	8. Teodor Florian	2. Beatrice Giurgiu	7. Irina Gorga	6. Antonio Brudiu	3. Alex Arambașa	1. Zoran Demian	5. Alexandru Aninoșanu	4. Anna-Maria Borcoș
