= Armenians in Bulgaria =

Bulgarian Armenians
Total population
- 6,552 (2011)

Regions with significant populations
- Plovdiv Province: 3,140; Varna Province: 2,240; Sofia: 1,672; Ruse: 1,500

Languages
- Armenian, Bulgarian

Related ethnic groups
- Armenian diaspora
- All figures from

Armenians in Bulgaria (Armenian: Հայերը Բուլղարիայում, romanized: Hayery Bulghariayum; Bulgarian: Арменци в България, romanized: Armentsi v Bulgariya) are the fifth largest minority, after Russians, in the country, numbering 6,552 according to the 2011 census, down from 10,832 in 2001, while Armenian organizations estimate up to 80,000. Armenians have lived in the Balkans (including the territory of modern Bulgaria) since no later than the 5th century, when they moved there as part of the Byzantine cavalry. Since then, the Armenians have had a continuous presence in Bulgarian lands and have often played an important part in the history of Bulgaria from early Medieval times until the present.

The main centres of the Armenian community in the country are the major cities Plovdiv (3,140 Armenians in Plovdiv Province in 2001), Varna (2,240 in Varna Province), Sofia (1,672) and Burgas (904 in Burgas Province).

The traditional language of the community is Western Armenian, though since education during the Communist period in Bulgaria was in Eastern Armenian, many are also fluent in the latter dialect. Bulgarian, being the official language, is spoken fluently by almost all Armenians in the country.

== History ==
The Armenians that settled between the 6th and the 11th century in the Rhodopes, Thrace and Macedonia were several thousand in number, mostly Paulicians and Tondrakians and had very strong communal ties. They had very strong ties and influenced the Bulgarian sect of the Bogomils and were later assimilated into it, Bulgarianized and later converted to Roman Catholicism (see Roman Catholicism in Bulgaria) or Islam (see Pomaks). The mother of 11th-century Bulgarian tsar Samuil was the daughter of the Armenian king, Ashot II. Maria, the wife of 10th-century Tsar Peter I, was the granddaughter of Byzantine emperor of Armenian origin, Romanos I Lekapenos. Another Byzantine emperor—Basil I, the founder of the Macedonian dynasty and an Armenian from Thrace—spent his early years as a captive in the First Bulgarian Empire in the 9th century.

After both Bulgaria and Armenia were conquered by the Ottoman Empire, many Armenian settlers from Armenia, Crimea, the Polish–Lithuanian Commonwealth and Asia Minor arrived in what is now Bulgaria due to internal migration. Those coming from Armenia were forced to seek a new homeland because of their country's devastation by Arabs, Persians, and Turks. With Bulgaria gaining autonomy in the aftermath of the Russo-Turkish War of 1877-78, many Armenians fled the Ottoman Empire because of the Hamidian massacres in the 1890s and settled in the country, particularly in the major cities of Plovdiv and Varna. In 1878, there were 5,300 Armenians in the Principality of Bulgaria and Eastern Rumelia, and this number increased by almost 20,000 after the Hamidian massacres.

At the time of the Balkan Wars (1912–1913) the Armenians in Bulgaria numbered about 35,000. During this time the legendary Armenian national hero, Andranik Ozanian participated in the First Balkan War in the Bulgarian army, alongside general Garegin Nzhdeh (another national hero) as a commander of Armenian auxiliary troops. Bulgarian authorities honored Andranik and Nzhdeh with the Order of Bravery.

In the Second Balkan War, the Armenians and their officers disagreed with Bulgaria's stance against their allies and disbanded the company, refusing to participate. The Armenians later discovered that Tsar Ferdinand had banned the circulation of Armenian newspapers in Bulgaria due to the criticism they leveled against Bulgarian policy.

Despite Bulgaria allied with the Ottomans at the World War I, Bulgaria had criticized the Ottomans for the Armenian genocide. After the events surrounding the Armenian genocide in the Ottoman Empire (1915–1917) 22,000 additional Armenians sought refuge in Bulgaria during the government of Aleksandar Stamboliyski in 1922.

According to the archives, it was difficult for Armenians to obtain Bulgarian citizenship. For many years they lived with Nansen passports. However, these passports didn't give them full civil rights. This practice ended only in 1937–1942 for the Armenian men, and for the Armenian women – after 1944. However, some Armenians remained with Nansen passports, although they were a minority.

During the Communist rule of Bulgaria (1944–1989) and the time of the Soviet Union, most of the Armenians returned to their homeland, then the Armenian SSR, but many chose to stay in Bulgaria or emigrate to other countries such as the United States. In the 1960s, several thousand Bulgarian Armenians succeeded to emigrate from the People's Republic of Bulgaria, despite the communist regime's severe restrictions on any travel outside the country. This emigrant wave remains little known, as the regime censored this successful emigration beyond the Iron Curtain. The emigration between 1962 and 1969 was an anomaly against the background of the realities in Communist Bulgaria. The emigration included various phases, with the authorities allowing it at times, albeit reluctantly. The emigration was banned twice, and the departures were finally stopped in 1969, both because of the threat of mass exodus of most Armenians from Bulgaria, and because of the risk of a negative propaganda effect in the country and abroad.

In the 1990s, after the dissolution of the USSR, the poor economic conditions in Armenia and the military conflicts in the Caucasus caused a number of Armenians to seek a better future in Bulgaria as emigrants or travel through Bulgaria to western Europe or the United States. Since the 1990s the population of Armenians in Bulgaria has continually decreased due to emigration and assimilation.

== Culture, religion and media ==
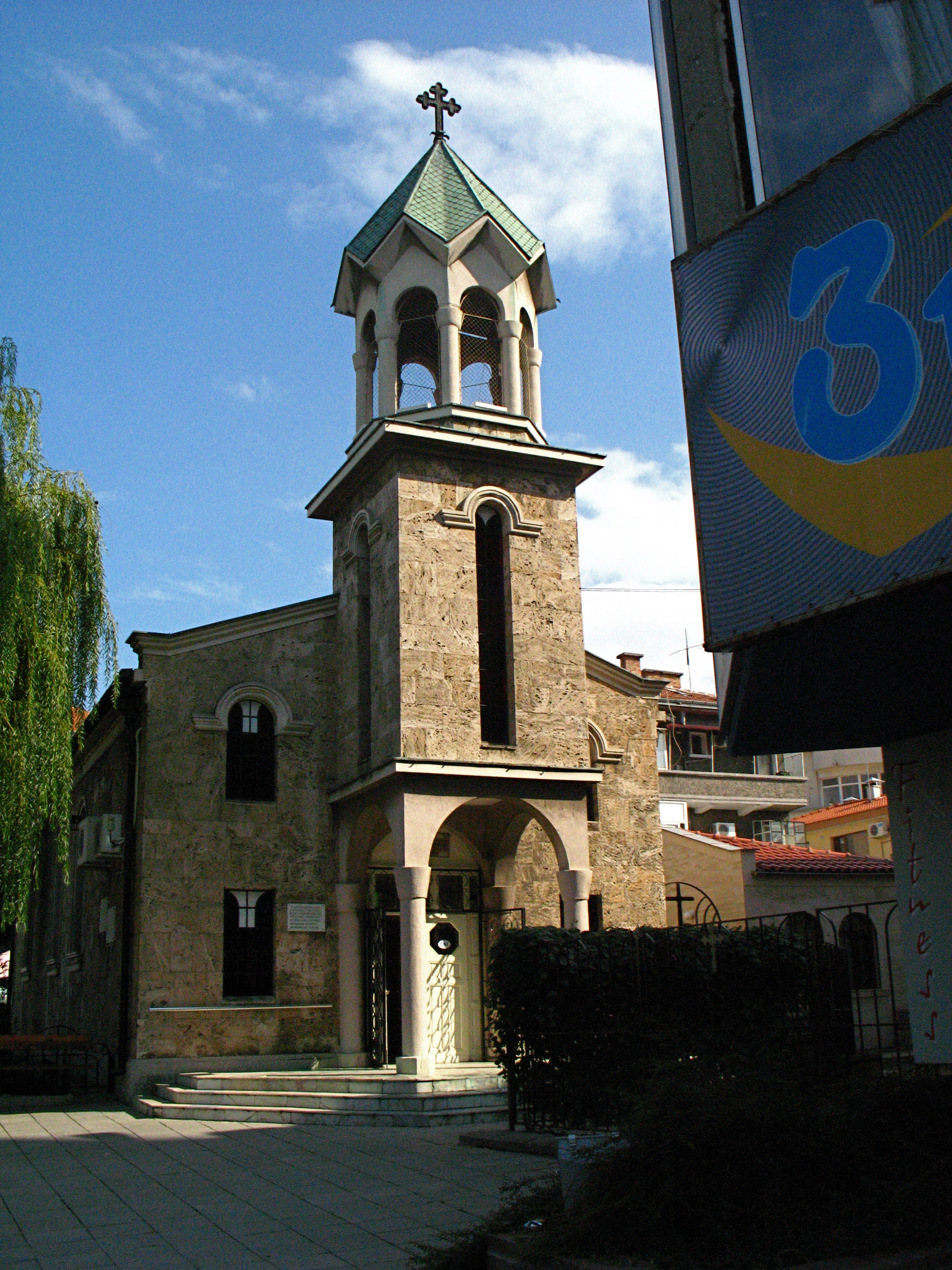
Armenian Apostolic church in Burgas, Bulgaria

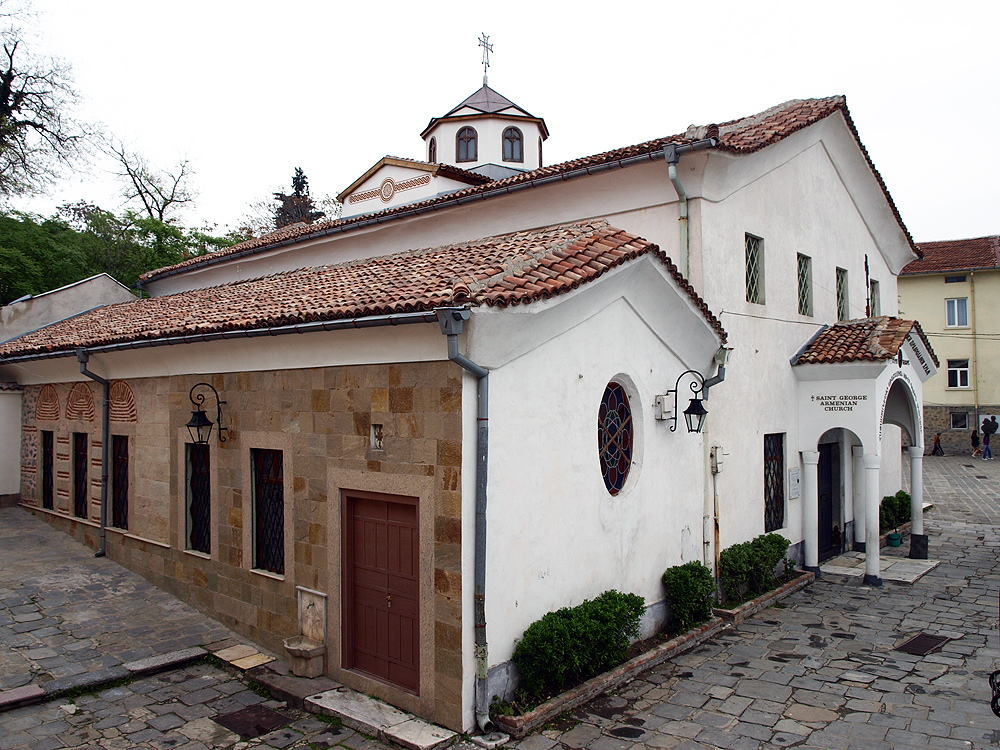
Armenian Apostolic church St. George in Plovdiv, Bulgaria

The Armenians and their historical faith were an inspiration for noted Bulgarian poet Peyo Yavorov to write one of his most recognizable works, the poem Armentsi (Armenians), describing the Armenians as 'forlorn exiles, a miserable fragment; of an ever-brave martyr-people; little children of a troubled slavewoman-mother; and victims of a legendarily great feat':

Изгнаници клети, отломка нищожна

от винаги храбър народ мъченик,
дечица на майка робиня тревожна
и жертви на подвиг чутовно велик –
далеч от родина, в край чужди събрани,
изпити и бледни, в порутен бордей,
те пият, а тънат сърцата им в рани,

и пеят, тъй както през сълзи се пей.

Armenians, wretched exiles, tiny splinter

Of their ever valiant, long-suffering kin,
Of restless slave mother tough breed, in the winter –
The victims of their great exploit – or their sin –
From their homeland banished, in foreign land scattered,
Exhausted and pale, in a gloomy saloon,
Now drinking, as their hearts are bleeding, in tatters,
Now singing, through tears, the ballad of doom.

(Translated by V.H., 2013)

Three Armenian newspapers are published in Bulgaria: Armentsi issued in Burgas every fortnight with a circulation of 3,500; the weekly Vahan issued in Plovdiv with a circulation of 1,000; and the weekly Erevan issued in Sofia. The Armenian General Benevolent Union (AGBU) publishes a monthly bulletin Parekordzagani Tsayn.

There are a total of ten Armenian Apostolic churches and two chapels in twelve cities, mostly in those urban centres with a significant Armenian population: Aytos, Burgas, Pazardzhik, Russe, Shumen, Sliven, Stara Zagora, Varna and Yambol. All churches are under an eparchy based in Sofia. The Armenian Evangelical Church in Bulgaria is located in Plovdiv.

== Notable Bulgarian Armenians ==
- Armen Ambartsumyan, footballer (goalkeeper) and Armenia international
- Michael Arlen, writer
- Artine Artinian, French literature scholar
- Krikor Azaryan, theatre director
- Yuliya Berberyan, nine times Bulgarian tennis champion in the 1960s and 1970s, tennis coach and UDF deputy
- Raffi Bohosyan, winner of the first series of Bulgarian X Factor
- Steven Derounian, American congressman from New York
- Eduard Eranosyan, footballer and manager
- Magardich Halvadjian, film director and producer
- Vili Kazasyan, composer and conductor
- Kirkor Kirkorov, amateur boxer
- Agop Melkonyan, journalist and prolific SciFi author
- Stephen Sacklarian, Artist
- Armen Nazaryan, Greco-Roman wrestler (naturalized)
- Norair Nurikyan, weightlifter
- Raya Nazaryan, politician

=== Partially Armenian Bulgarians ===
- Philipp Kirkorov, singer, actor and television presenter
- Katerina Maleeva, tennis player
- Magdalena Maleeva, tennis player
- Manuela Maleeva, tennis player
- Alice Panikian, Miss Universe Canada 2006
- Sylvie Vartan, French pop singer and music hall impresario

== See also ==
- Armenia–Bulgaria relations
- Armenian diaspora
- Immigration to Bulgaria
