= Margarita Hranova =

Bulgarian singer

Margarita Nikolova Hranova-Boycheva (in Bulgarian Маргарита Хранова) is a Bulgarian singer.

== Biography ==
Margarita Nikolova Hranova-Boycheva is born on 20 December 1951 in Sliven, Bulgaria. Her father - Nikola Hranov was officer from Bulgarian kingdom`s army. In high school she was a singer in the group Mayakovsky. Hristova starts to play on a piano. She finished the National Academy of Music in the class of Irina Chmihova. Hristova finished her education National Academy of Music (Bulgaria). She was awarded the Lifetime Achievement prize of the Golden Orpheus festival.

== Filmography ==
- Peesh ili luzhesh (season 1, guest artist)

== Discography ==
- Маргарита Хранова/Margarita Hranova(1974)
- Романтика/Romance(1977)
- Моето мъжко момиче/My male girl(1979)
- Далечни дни/Many days(1981)
- 5(1983)
- C'est La Vie(1986)
