= Yordanka Hristova =

Bulgarian singer

Yordanka Hristova (in Bulgarian Йорданка Христова) is a Bulgarian singer.

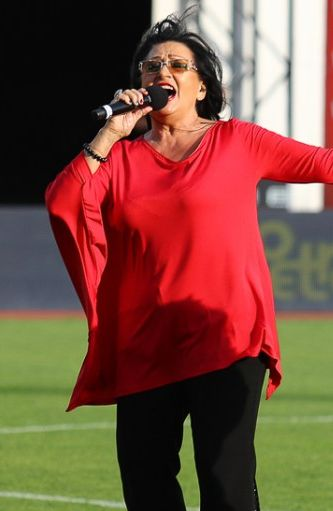
Yordanka Hristova in 2018

== Biography ==
Academician Yordanka Ivanova Hristova was born on 10 September 1943 in Sofia, Bulgaria. Hristova finished her education at the National Academy of Music. In 1964 she performed on her first tour in Romania. She was singer in the Sofia Pop Orchestra.

She took the first place on Golden Orpheus in 1966. She is the most popular Bulgarian singer in Cuba.

She gave birth to two children. In 2005 a movie about her life was made. In 2013 Hristova celebrated 50 years on the scene.

== Filmography ==
- Peesh ili luzhesh (season 1, guest artist)

== Discography ==
- Yordanka Hristova (1966)
- Мой приятелю,Несебър (My friend Nessebar)(1966)
- Всяка обич (Every love)(1969)
- С теб (With You)(1972)
- Времето (The Time) (1973)
- Песен за всички (Song for everyone) (1973)
- Земята ще бъде на всички (The Earth will be for all of us)(1974)
- Влюбени (In love) (1975)
- Изповед (Confession) (1975)
- Молитва (Prayer) (1976)
- Спортни песни (Sport songs) (1976)
- Пей сърце (Sing my heart)(1979)
- Йорданка и звънчетата (Yordanka and the bells)(with You)(1985)
- Душите са ни заедно (Our souls are together)(1987)
- Влюбена в живота (In love in life)(1989)
- The quiero (The quiero) (1999)
- Песен моя,обич моя (My song, my love) (The quiero)(2004)
- Има ли думи за сбогом (Does it had words for Goodbye) (2007)
- Златни латино хитове (Golden Latin Hits)(2008)
