= Leo Bianchi =

Italian-born Bulgarian singer-songwriter, chef and TV personality (born 1974)

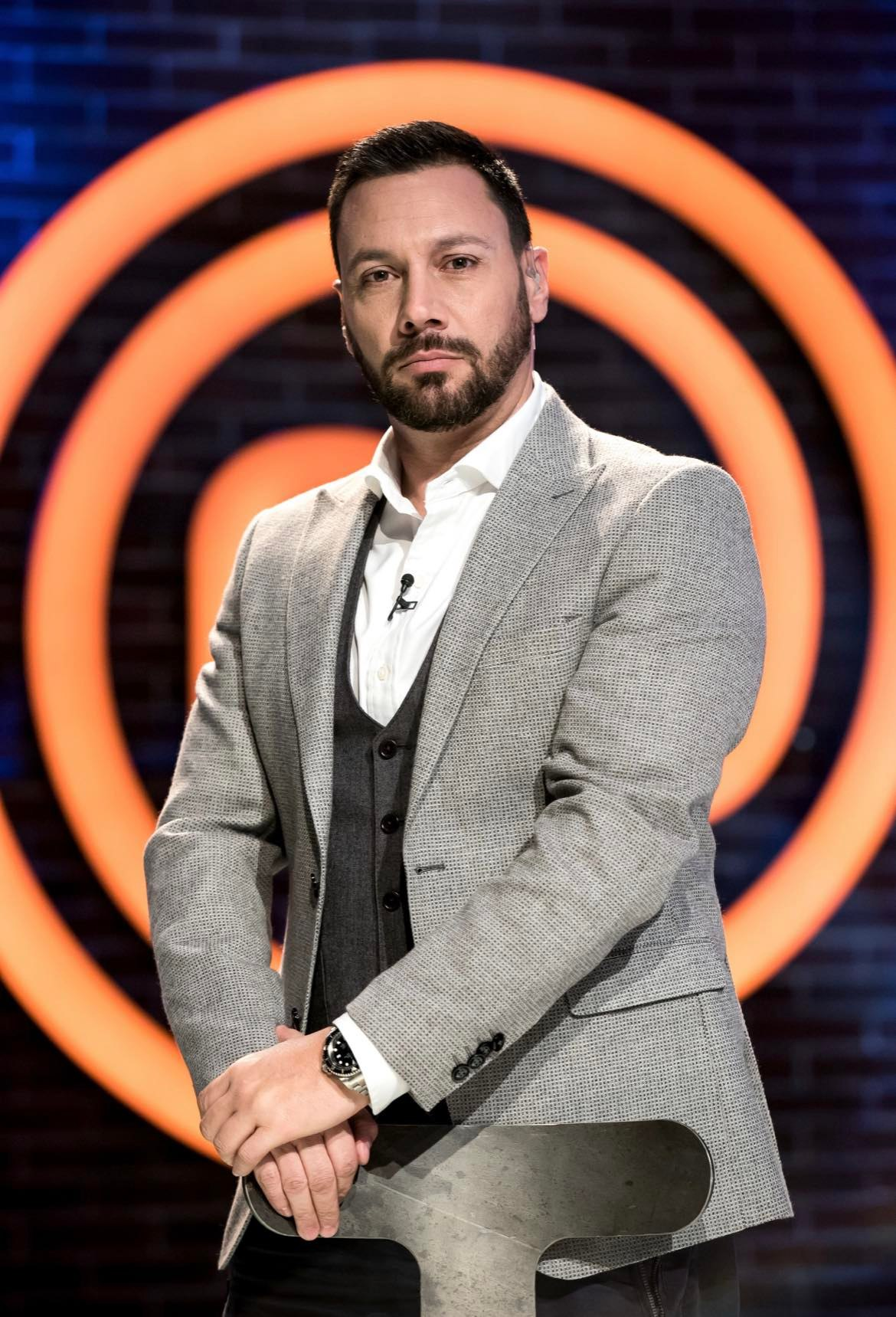
- Bianchi in 2022

Background information
- Birth name: Leonardo Bianchi
- Born: 9 March 1974 (age 51); Ancona, Italy
- Genres: Pop, R&B
- Occupation(s): Singer-songwriter, chef, tv personality, businessman
- Instrument: Vocalist
- Years active: 2006–present

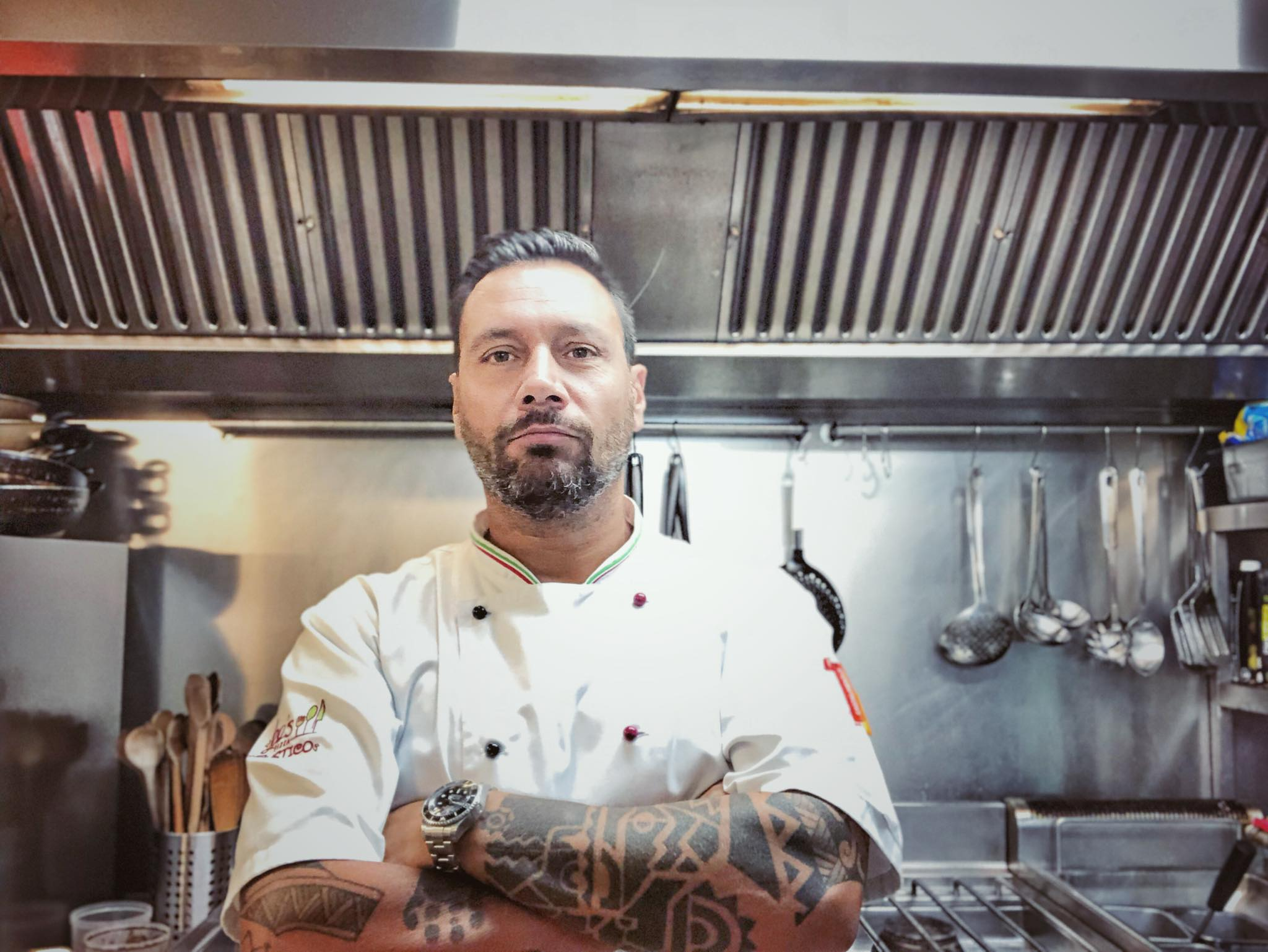

Leo Bianchi (Bulgarian: Лео Бианки; born 9 March 1974) is an Italian-born Bulgarian singer-songwriter, chef and TV personality. He has released a number of singles at times using the mononym Лео (or Leo) and cooperated with a number of artists, notably Deo, Igrata amongst many. He took part in the Bulgarian TV reality show Big Brother 2 in 2005 and in Big Brother All Stars 2013, in both of which he finished as runner-up.

== Biography ==
Bianchi was born on 9 March 1974, in Ancona. At age 15, he stopped going to school and started searching for a job. Then he found the profession of cooking to be his passion. He first visited Bulgaria in 1992. Since 1994, he settled in the Bulgarian city of Burgas. In 2005, he participated in Big Brother 2 Bulgaria. He is the first foreigner to be in Big Brother Bulgaria. He stayed in the show till the final, but finished on second position. The show helped him a lot in real life. He became a chef in a Bulgarian cooking show on TV7.

Bianchi owns two Italian pizza restaurants and an Italian style coffee shop in the Bulgarian capital Sofia, where he now lives. In 2013, Leo participated again in Big Brother All Stars 2013 where he again finished second.

== Personal life ==
Leo lives in Sofia, Bulgaria with his wife Lucia. They have been engaged since 2004. In 2013, two weeks before he entered Big Brother All Stars, they had twins, born in Sofia, Bulgaria.

== Discography ==
=== Songs and videos ===
- "Пази маса" (with Deo) (2006)
- "Е, и?" (with Deo) (2007)
- "Give Me Your Hand" (feat. Nikita) (2007)
- "Ако искаш да те забележат (with Igrata and Krisko) (2010)
- "Айде на морето" (with Igrata) (2012)
- "Weekend" (with Igrata) (2012)
- "Яко парти" (2012)
- "100 неща" (with Yoanna) (2013)
- "Целият свят" (with Deo) (2013)
- "Цяло лято" (with Igrata and Krisko) (2013)
- "4D" (with Igrata, Deo and Raffi) (2013)
- "Да, да, да" (with Igrata and Bate Pesho) (2013)
- "Дай газ" (with Deo) (2013)
- "За Вас" (2014)
- "Всеки миг" (with Deo, Igrata, Din-Yo and Marina) (2014)
- "Цяла нощ" (with JJ) (2014)
- "Ей така" (with Igrata and Starlight) (2014)
- "Mr. Comandante" (with Igrata, Deo and Raffi) (2014)
- "Безгрижно"(with Deo) (2015)
- "№1" (with Igrata and Deo) (2015)
- "Имам си мечта" (with Igrata and Deo feat. Lexus) (2015)
- "Priatel" (2015)
- "Lettera d'amico" (Stritti feat Leo) (2015)
- "Se Torno" (2016)
- "Pensiero Positivo" (with Gergana Nikolaeva) (2016)
- "Сега сме други" (with Igrata and Skandau) (2016)
- "Така ми е добре" (with Igrata and Дичо) (2017)
- "ФИЛМ" (with Igrata feat. Bate Pesho) (2017)
- "Карамбол" (with Igrata and Skandau,Део,Дичо,Девора) (2017)
- "Show Biz" (2018)
- "PO TAKA" (with Igrata feat.Viara Atova) (2018)
- "Сладките й устни" (whit Deo feat. Moisey) (2019)
- "СБЕСНА ПЕНСИЯ" (whit Igrata feat. Pavel Kolev and Izaka) (2020)
- "Luce" (2020)
- "FAKE" (2021)
- "A LAY" (with Linda D) (2021)
- "ARCOBALENO" (2022)
- "CI PENSI MAI" (2022)
- "80 VOGLIA" (2022)
- "TRUE LOVE" (Stritti feat Leo (2022)
- "AMAMI ANCORA" (2023)
- "ATTIMI" (2023)
- "FALCONARA" (2023)
- "НА МОРЕТО"(whit Igrata) (2025)
