= Lea Ivanova =

Bulgarian jazz singer

Lea Ivanova Лилия Иванова
- Birth name: Lea Ivanova
- Born: 13 August 1923; Dupnitsa, Bulgaria
- Died: 28 May 1986 (aged 62)
- Genres: Jazz
- Occupation: Singer
- Labels: Qaliton, Deutsche Vogue, Electrorecord, MUZA, Balkanton

Lea Ivanova (13 August 1923 – 28 May 1986) was a Bulgarian jazz singer.

== Biography ==
Ivanova was born in Dupnitsa, Bulgaria on 13 August 1923. She moved to Constantinople ( Underaged?? ), where she spent the rest of her childhood and sang in the children's choir of the Bulgarian Exarchate. In 1940s, she came back to Bulgaria ( 17 years old ?? ), where her intention was to study art at Sofia, Bulgarian capitol. She joined Slavic Talk jazz orchestra as a soloist instead when saxophonist Leon L'Alfàs suggested her to join. In the early 50s, she performed with various jazz and swing outfits. In 1956, she worked with the orchestras of Christo Vuchkov and Dimitar Ganev for Big Orchestra Concert Directorate conductors of which were Boris Simeonov and Emil Georgiev. During this period, she wrote a commercial jingle for a department store TsUM and Chico from Puerto Rico which was in Latin American style.

In 1957, she and her husband, Eddie Kazasyan, formed Eddy Kazassian Combo orchestra with which they spent 30 years together. They performed in Belgrade in 1960 with Quincy Jones And His Orchestra, and in 1962 and 1963 at Friedrich Shtadt Palace in Berlin. From 1963 to 1983, Ivanova worked in various variety shows which included French chansons, evergreens, Russian romances, Bulgarian folklore and Italian canzone. She also shared a stage with Gilbert Bécaud and Udo Jürgens. Her music was banned in her home country, and she even was imprisoned and sent to a labor camp for promoting retrogressive sound and obscene behavior. After her release, she continued with her career till her final days. She died of cancer on 28 May 1986. Her labels include Bulgarian Balkanton, German Deutsche Vogue, Hungarian Qaliton, Polish MUZA and Romanian Electrorecord.
