= Live broadcast =

A live broadcasting, also called a live transmission, generally refers to various types of media that are broadcasting without a significant delay.

The most common seen media example of the live transmission is a news program or a news broadcasting.

Other types of live broadcasts include:

- Live radio
- Live television
- Internet television
- Internet radio
- Liveblogging
- Live streaming
