= Emil Koshlukov =

Bulgarian politician and journalist

- Born: 26 October 1965 (age 60); Pazardzhik, Bulgaria
- Occupations: Politician; Journalist

Emil Iliev Koshlukov (Bulgarian: Емил Илиев Кошлуков; born 26 October 1965) is a Bulgarian journalist, former politician, M.P., and media manager, director of the Bulgarian National Television (2019–2026).

== Biography ==
Born in Pazardzhik, Koshlukov graduated from the English Language High School in Plovdiv in 1985 and subsequently studied English philology at Sofia University. Between 1991 and 1996, he was also enrolled as a political science student at the University of California, Santa Barbara.

In 1989, he was one of the leading figures behind the formation of the first independent student organizations in communist Bulgaria and participated in civil disobedience campaigns against the government. After being affiliated with the UDF in the early 1990s, in 2001 Koshlukov was elected to the National Parliament for the first time as part of NDSV. In 2004, he founded the New Age (Bulgarian: Новото Време) political party and became its chairman. The new party was not able to find representation in the National Parliament following the 2005 elections.

In 2009, Koshlukov participated for 25 consecutive days in the third season of reality show VIP Brother on the Bulgarian commercial TV channel Nova. He was the only politician among a total of 25 celebrity participants.

In early 2018, Koshlukov was appointed programme director of BNT1, the main channel of public service broadcaster Bulgarian National Television (BNT). At the same time, he continued to host the daily political talk show More from the Day.

In 2019, the Bulgarian Council for Electronic Media appointed Koshlukov interim Director General of BNT.

In February 2026 he was replaced by Milena Milotinova as the Director General of BNT.

== Scandals ==
After just one month in his new post, protests broke out against some of his decisions—protests he described as groundless. While serving as programme director, Koshlukov also hosted the BNT show Oshte ot denya (“More from the Day”). During one broadcast he raised a middle finger on air (for which he later apologised). The newly appointed head of BNT’s “Information” directorate, Ulyana Pramova—under whose remit Koshlukov’s programme falls—remarked that he had probably acted in a moment of passion, but she could not discipline him because she was his subordinate, not his superior. As BNT’s director, Koshlukov dismissed several on-air personalities for various contentious reasons, including Iskra Angelova, Kamen Alipiev (“Kedara”), Boryana Puncheva and Mario Gavrilov, provoking criticism.

=== Calls for resignation ===
On 14 July 2020, after parliamentary culture-and-media-committee chair Vezhdi Rashidov proposed extending Koshlukov’s mandate, a group of journalists, writers and artists issued an open letter urging him to resign as BNT director. They argued that "BNT is run by a director-general whose professional qualifications for the position are questionable… In a short time BNT has lost the authority it gained through objectivity, dialogue and programming that served viewers free of political or government dependence".

Supporters of his resignation include Yavor Gardev, Ulyana Pramova, Hristo Ivanov—who demanded it live in BNT’s studio—[15] Ivan Lechev, Zahari Karabashliev, Boryana Puncheva, Goran Blagoev, Iskra Angelova, Vyara Panteleeva, Kamen Alipiev, Alexandra Pendatchanska, Nayo Titsin, Prof. Evgeniy Dainov, Tikhon Tiveriopolski, Miglena Nikolchina, Hieromonk Nikanor Mishkov, Krum Savov, Kameliya Doncheva, Milena Getova, Vasko Krapkata, Kalin Terziyski, Teodor Ushev, Veselin Kalanovski, Veselin Veselinov, Vasil Gyurov, Viktor Lilov, Boyko Stankushev, Mario Gavrilov and others.

In September 2020 a second open letter from artists and cultural figures—supporting anti-government protests—called for the resignations of Emil Koshlukov, Boyko Borissov, Ivan Geshev, Vezhdi Rashidov and Tsveta Karayancheva. Signatories included Prof. Margarita Mladenova, Vasil Vasilev ("Zueka"), Deyan Donkov, Albena Koleva, Radina Kardzhilova, Iglika Trifonova, Hristo Garbov, Angel Igov, Ruth Koleva, Militsa Gladnishka, Yulia Spiridonova, Maria Kasimova-Moase, Milena Markova, Nikola Toromanov, Alexander Alexiev, Yana Titova, Stoyan Alexiev, Galin Stoev, Samuel Finzi, Gergana Dimitrova, Petar Valchanov, Reni Vrangova, Angel Dyulgerov, Silvia Petkova, Eva Tepavicharova, Hristo Uzunov, Stanka Kalcheva, Stefan Komandarev, Stefania Koleva, Alexander Morfov, Dosyo Dosev, Elena Telbis, Manol Peykov, Martina Troanska, Marin Bodakov, Svetlana Yancheva, Darina Takova, Prof. Ivan Dobchev, Damyan Damyanov, Dimitar Kenarov, Koprinka Chervenkova, Chavdar Gyuzelev, Kalin Serapionov, Zornitsa Hristova, Emil Emilov and many others.

On 2 October 2020 the calls were joined by Prof. Tsvetana Maneva, Yavor Milushev, Vesela Babinova, Yulian Vergov, Yavor Karaivanov, Vasilena Vincenzo, Kŭtsi Vaptsarov, Elena Boycheva, Roza Nikolova, Assoc. Prof. Dr. Momchil Tsvetanov, Filip Andreev, Ivan Panayotov, Anastasia Ingilizova, Boyan Papazov, Momchil Stepanov, Viktor Tanev, Emil Djassim, Manol Glishev and others.
