= Veselin Marinov =

Bulgarian pop singer (born 1961)

- Born: Veselin Stefanov Marinov; 4 August 1961 (age 65); Polski Trambesh, Bulgaria
- Genres: Pop, pop rock, pop-folk
- Occupations: Singer-songwriter, tv personality
- Instrument: Vocalist
- Years active: 1981–present
- Labels: Balkanton, Payner

Veselin Stefanov Marinov (Bulgarian: Веселин Стефанов Маринов; born 4 August 1961), better known as Vesko Marinov, is a Bulgarian pop singer.

== Biography ==
Veselin Marinov was born in the town of Polski Trambesh (near Veliko Tarnovo) on 4 August 1961 to Yordanka and Stefan Marinov.

At an early age, he started playing football and continued playing on amateur level until the age of 38, when he got an injury. He played for local Yantra Polski Trambesh, Sikonko Klimentovo and Loviko Suhindol. He is a suporter of Mancchester United and Ludogorets Razgrad.

== Career ==
=== Early beginnings ===
Veselin started his involvement with music when he was in the 7th grade. He started to play and sing in a school group. During the compulsory military service Veselin Marinov realized that the music is his destiny and he applied in National Academy of Music (Bulgaria). In 1981, at the beginning of his studies, he was invited to become the lead singer of Bulgarian rock band Impuls. His first stage appearance was on 2 December 1982 in Vidin, Bulgaria. The band produced progressive rock music, and their first song with Marinov on vocals was Midnight music. The first song which was composed by Marinov himself was You came. In 1983, he graduated the Pop Music Department of Bulgarian Music Academy in the class of Petar Dimitrov. In 1984, Veselin underwent two operations of the vocal cords and left Impuls.

=== Solo career ===
In 1987, his first solo album, "From love", was released. After releasing his second album ("About Love"- 1990), Veselin Marinov relocated to Germany due to financial problems and very low sales of his plate. He has been working in Germany for four years and has released two albums there. Marinov returned to Bulgaria in 1994 because of a tooth inflammation. After the surgery he started working with the leading authors in Bulgaria, Toncho Rusev and Evtim Evtimov, and recorded three of his most popular songs – "You are the love" (bulg. "Ти си любовта"), "Bitter wine" (bulg. "Горчиво вино") and "For you, Bulgaria" (bulg. "За теб, Българийо"). These songs bring him great success and make him one of the most beloved and popular names in Bulgarian pop music. The albums that follow – "Bitter Wine" (1995) and "Wine and Love" (1999) are some of the best-selling in Bulgaria since 1989. Veselin Marinov releasеs a new album almost every year since 1998.

=== Christmas ===
Veselin Marinov is the only performer in Bulgaria (and maybe in the world), who has two solo albums with original Christmas songs – Christmas Dream (Коледен сън) – 2003 and The most expensive gift in the world (Най-скъпият подарък на света) – 2010. He makes concert tours with his Christmas songs every December in the biggest cities of Bulgaria.

== Filmography ==
- Peesh ili luzhesh (season 1, guest artist)

== Concerts ==
Marinov is the singer with the most concerts in Bulgaria. He performs in at least 60 solo concerts each year. He has 25 concerts (by 2018) in the biggest (4000) and most prestigious concert hall in Bulgaria and one in the largest (13 000) multifunctional hall.

== Awards ==
- 1st place and Audience Award Youth Festival of Popular Song of 1983, song "You came"
- 2nd place Youth Festival of Popular Song, song "The dock of love"
- 1st place Youth Festival of Popular Song, song "Piano for two"
- International Festival of Young Performers of 1986 – Tbilisi, USSR
- Grand Prix Intervision Song Contest'1989
- Grand Prix Golden Orpheus of 1994, song "Bitter Wine"
- Melody of the year of 1995, song "Bitter Wine"
- 1st place Spring Radio Competition of 1995, song "Bitter Wine"
- 2nd place Spring Radio Competition of 1997, song "Woman on the balcony"
- Grand Prix EuroFest of 1999, Skopije
- Audience Award Pirinfolk – 1998 and 2004
- Grand Prix Pirinfolk – 2002
- Crystal Lyre of 2005 – Prize of Union of Bulgarian musicians and dancers
- Singer of the year – 2003, 2004 and 2005
