= Raffi Boghosyan =

Raffi Рафи Րաֆֆի
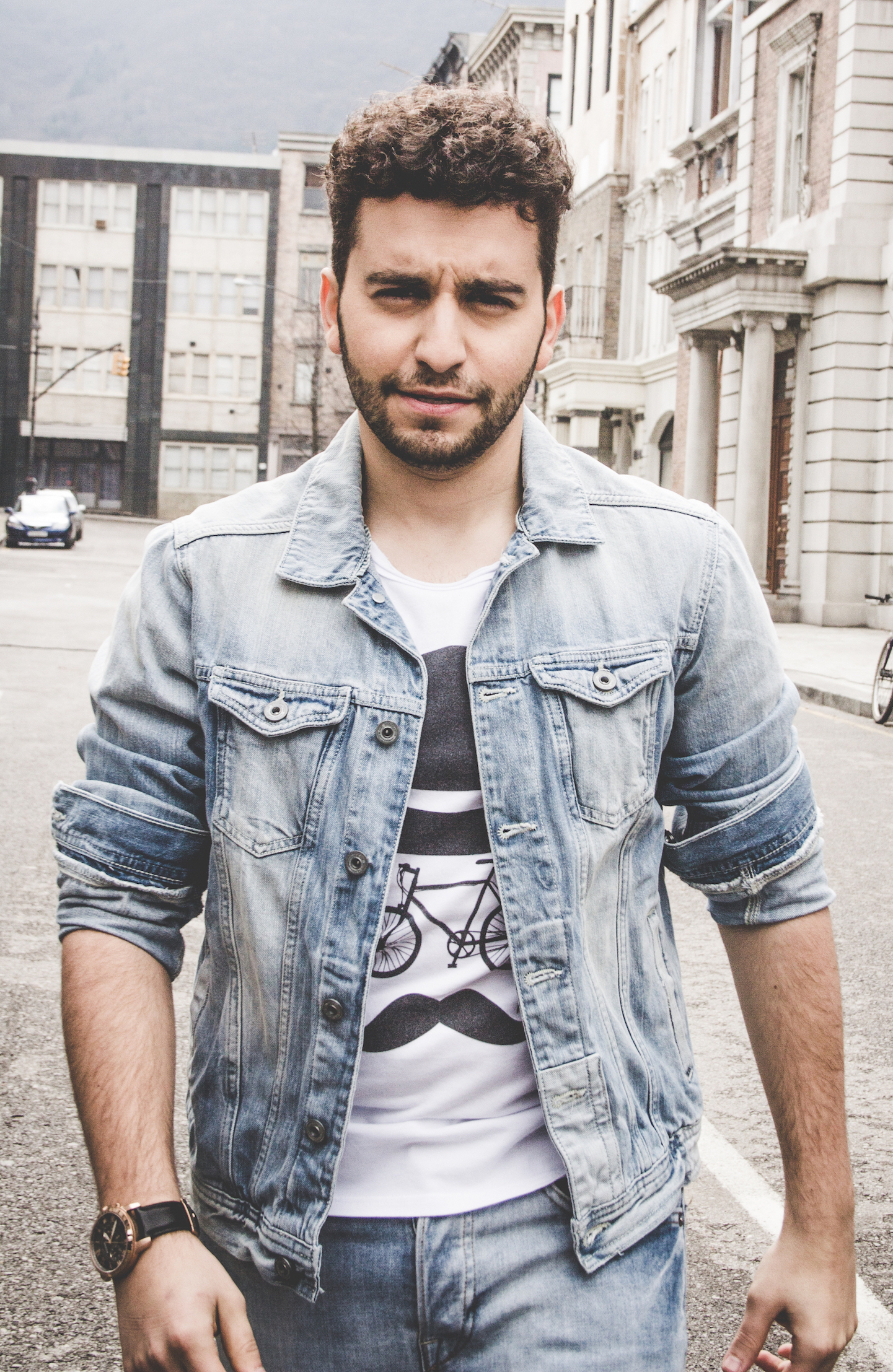
- A shot from the song "Find Me"

Background information
- Birth name: Raffi Aghasi Boghosyan
- Born: 29 January 1993 (age 32); Burgas, Bulgaria
- Genres: Pop
- Instruments: Vocal; Percussions
- Years active: 2011–present
- Labels: Virginia Records; Raffi Music

Raffi Aghasi Boghosyan (Bulgarian: Рафи Ахаси Бохосян, romanized: Rafi Akhasi Bokhosyan; Armenian: Րաֆֆի Աղասի Բողոսյան; born 29 January 1993), also known simply as Raffi or Rafi, is a Bulgarian singer and percussions player of Armenian origin who won the first ever Bulgarian X Factor on the final held on 11 December 2011. He won a contract with Virginia Records and the chance to record a single with a foreign composer and producer in a studio outside Bulgaria.

Boghosyan was born in Burgas to Aghas and Elizabeth Bohosyan, both Armenians. He studied in Business in Burgas majoring in Economics and Management. He is a self-taught percussion player. He is also interested in photography, martial arts and activities and is the President of "Младежки глас" (Youth Voice) Cultural Association.

== Singles and videography ==
(In parentheses, peak positions on Bulgarian Top 40)

- 2012: "4-3-2-1" (BUL: #2)
- 2013: "Ne me razbra" (in Bulgarian "Не ме разбра") (BUL: #27)
- 2016: "Nameri me" (in Bulgarian "Намери ме) (Find me))

Collaborations

- 2013: "4D" (Deo, Leo, Raffi & Igrata)
- 2014: "Nali taka" (Raffi & Hoodini)
- 2014: "V Nashija film" (with Deo featuring Leo, Raffi and Igrata)
- 2014: "Mr. Comandante" (Raffi featuring Deo, Leo and Igrata)
- 2015: "Nov Den (New Day)" (Raffi feat. REWIND)
