= Magarditch Halvadjian =

Bulgarian film and television director and producer (born 1967)

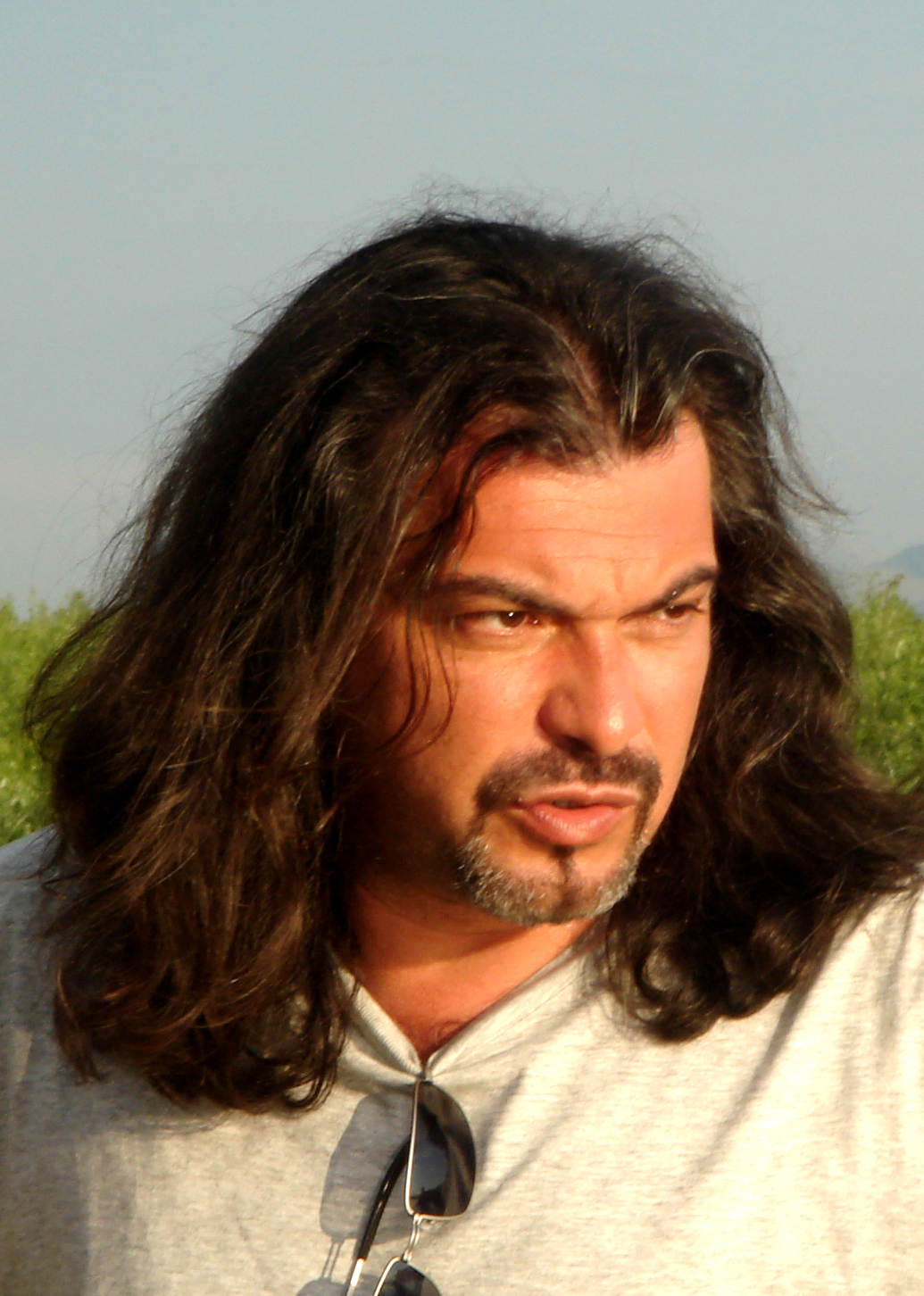
- Magarditch Halvadjian - Bulgarian TV producer and director
- Born: 18 February 1967 (age 59); Pleven, Bulgaria
- Occupations: TV and Movie Producer, Director
- Years active: 1992–present

Magarditch "Magi" Halvadjian (Bulgarian: Магърдич Халваджиян "Маги"; Armenian: Մկրտիչ հալվաճեան) is a Bulgarian TV and movie producer and director. He has been involved in directing since 1992.

== Early life and education ==
Magarditch Halvadjian was born on 18 February 1967 in Pleven, Bulgaria of Armenian descent. He graduated from the New Bulgarian University with a master's degree in directing and later taught Directing and Production in TV Show-business at the same university. He later studied at the Moscow Circus School from 1981 to 1986.

== Career ==
In 1996, he established Max Group - 1, associated with the production of the TV shows Crossing Point and Fatal Attraction. In 2002 he founded the production companies Global Films and Global Frame, Open Frames, lineal heir to Global Group.

In 2012, Magarditch Halvadjian and his associates established the Open Frames company, which focused on film production. In 2015 the company shot its first movie called Nightworld. The main role in the movie is played by the American actor Jason London and his partner Robert Englund (Freddy Krueger).

The next project for the company is the movie Havana Darkness – shot in the US and Cuba – the first horror movie in history shot in Cuba.

In the fall of 2016, Open Frames produced and shot Welcome to Acapulco. The shooting took place in Acapulco, Mexico and New York, US. The main cast included Michael Madison, William Baldwin and Paul Sorvino.

In the summer of 2017, he shot a short comedy – The Elephone Man, which he wrote and directed. The film was selected by several international film festivals in the US and Europe.

Magarditch Halvadjian was a chairman of the Movie and Television Producers Association from 2009 to 2012.

In 2014, he became co-founder and a member of the management board of the Film Committee Association of Bulgaria. A year later, in 2015 he was honoured with the title "Academic" from the Bulgarian Academy of Science and Art.

At the end of 2016, Magarditch Halvadjian received a "Golden Century" badge of honour from the Ministry of Culture for his outstanding contribution to Bulgarian culture and the development of cultural cooperation.

He was awarded the "Best TV Producer" by Darik radio's "Man of the Year".

In the autumn of 2017, Magarditch Halvadjian produced a TV series Suburban Cops, by the original Spanish TV series Los Hombres de Paco. From 2019 he has been the producer of the Bulgarian version of the mystery music show The Masked Singer and the series 'The Road of Honour on Nova TV.

In 2020 and 2021 he has been the producer of the next seasons of Your Face Sounds Familiar, The Masked Singer, and the first season of Rachkov's Forbidden Show.

== Transphobic controversy ==
Magarditch Halvadijan is an activist for the Society and Values Association. They promote conversion therapy and believe that the "transsexual movement is linked with paedophilia". The association also promotes marriage as a union between a man and a woman, as well as promoting traditional family values. They also stand against surrogacy, euthanasia, alcohol, pornography, prostitution and marijuana.

== Filmography ==
=== Movies ===
- The Elephone Man – 2017, Short film
  - Executive Producer, director and writer
  - Genre: Comedy, shot in Bulgaria
- Welcome to Acapulco – 2016, Feature film
  - Executive Producer
  - Genre: Action/Comedy/Thriller, shot in Mexico
- Havana Darkness – 2016, Feature film
  - Executive Producer
  - Genre: Thriller, shot in Cuba and US
- Nightworld – 2015, Feature film
  - Producer
  - Genre: Horror/Thriller, shot in Bulgaria
- Project Bulgaria – 2005
  - Producer
  - Series of documentaries and commercials (in Bulgarian, English, German, French and Russian), promoting Bulgaria as an attractive tourist destination, created by order of Bulgarian Tourism Authority.
- The Winnings – 2000
  - Director and Script-writer
  - In 2000 the movie The Winnings was shot with the cooperation of Bulgarian National Television, Boyana Film EAD and Eurofootball. Written and directed by Megerdich Halvadjian
  The premiere of the movie was on Kanal 1 of the Bulgarian National Television in September 2001 and was widely acclaimed by the public and movie critics. The movie "The Winnings" was invited to take part at the prestigious international film festival in Saraevo in 2002 – "Saraevo Film Fest".
- Farewell, Lilly – 2002
  - Directed by Valeri Milev, Producer – Magarditch Halvadjian
  - (First prize at the New Bulgarian University Festival and a nomination of Jameson at Sofia Film fest 2003).
- Tingle – 1999
  - Director and Script-writer
  - Kodak prize at Golden Rose Film Festival, 2000
- Duel – 1996
  - Director and Producer – Megerdich Halvadjian
  - Director – Stefan Komandarev
- The Killer Ranger – 1995
  - Director, producer and scriptwriter
  - Second prize at the NBU Student Festival
- Madness – 1994
  - Director, producer and scriptwriter
  - First prize at the NBU Student Festival

=== TV Series ===
- The Road of Honor – 2019 – broadcast on NOVA TV (1 season, 52 episodes)
  - Producer
- Suburban Cops – 2018 – TV series under the original format “Los hombres de Paco”, broadcast on the national NOVA TV (1 season, 25 episodes)
  - Producer and director of several episodes
- Seven Hours Difference – 2011–2013 – TV series, broadcast on the national TV channel bTV (4 seasons, about 75 episodes)
  - Producer of the TV series and director of the pilot
- Sea Salt – 2004 – broadcast on the national NOVA TV (2 seasons, 47 episodes)
  - Producer of the TV series and director of the first episodes

=== TV shows ===
- Like Two Drops of Water (the Bulgarian version of “Your Face Sounds Familiar” – under a license by Endemol International B.V) – broadcast on the national NOVA TV (13 seasons, 12 or 13 episodes each – 2013, 2014, 2015, 2016, 2017, 2018, 2019, 2020, 2021, 2022, 2023, 2024, 2025)
  - Producer and Jury member in seasons 1, 2, 3 and Guest Jury in several episodes during other seasons
- Rachkov's Forbidden Show– broadcast on the national NOVA TV (2 seasons, 13 episodes each – 2021)
  - Producer
- The Masked Singer (the Bulgarian version of "The King of Mask Singer" – broadcast on the national NOVA TV (3 seasons, 13 episodes each – 2019, 2020, 2021)
  - Producer
- The X Factor – Bulgaria (original format of "Fremantle Media") – broadcast on the national TV channel NOVA (2013 – season 2; 2014 – season 3; 2015 – season 4; 2017 – season 5).
  - Producer & Member of the jury (season 4)
- I Can See Your Voice – Bulgaria (under the license of CJ E&M and Signal Entertainment Group) – broadcast on the national NOVA TV (2 seasons, 18 episodes – 2016, 2024
  - Producer
- I Can Do That – Bulgaria (original format of Armoza Formats) – broadcast on the national NOVA TV in 2015, 12 episodes.
  - Producer
- The Big Hopes – music show by Global Films, aired in March 2014 on the national NOVA TV, 12 episodes
  - Producer
- All Inclusive – comedy show by "Global Frame", broadcast on the national NOVA TV in 2013, 10 episodes
  - Producer and director
- Bulgaria's Got Talent (original format of "Fremantle Media") – broadcast in 2011 and 2012 on the national TV channel bTV (2 seasons, 57 episodes)
  - Producer and jury member
- Complete Madness – comedy show by "Global Frame", broadcast on the national NOVA TV /previously produced by "Global Vision" and broadcast on NOVA TV in 2009, from September 2009 until April 2012 has been broadcast on bTV. And from September 2012 – 2013 again on NOVA TV/ – 3 seasons, about 120 episodes
  - Producer of the format and director of the first episodes
- Psychic Challenge – Bulgaria (2 seasons, 22 episodes) and "Psychic Challenge" – Romania (original format of "Rdf Rights") – broadcast on the national TV channel bTV (2008, 2009) and Romanian channel Kanal D
  - Executive Producer
- Fear Factor – Bulgaria (original format of Endemol International B.V.) – broadcast on the national NOVA TV in 2009 (20 episodes)
  - Executive Producer
- The Magnificent Six – broadcast in 2008, 2010 on the national TV channel bTV (2 seasons, about 45 episodes)
  - Producer and director
- Extreme Makeover – Bulgaria (original format of ABC) – broadcast on the national NOVA TV in 2007 (40 episodes)
  - Executive Producer
- Star Academy – Bulgaria (original format of Endemol International B.V.) – broadcast on the national NOVA TV in 2005 (about 98 episodes)
  - Executive Producer
- Power of Ten – Bulgaria (original format of CBS) – broadcast on the national NOVA TV in 2008 (11 episodes)
  - Producer
- Show Me the Money – Bulgaria (original format of Endemol International B.V.) – broadcast on TV channel TV7 in 2007 (78 episodes)
  - Producer
- Sea of Love ("All You Need Is Love" – original format of Endemol International B.V.) – broadcast on the national TV channel bTV from 2003 to 2012 (9 seasons, about 480 episodes)
  - Producer
- Lords of the Air– comedy show by "Global Frame", broadcast on the national NOVA TV /previously produced by "Global Vision" and broadcast on NOVA in 2003–2009, from September 2009 until April 2012 broadcast on bTV. And from September 2012 – 2018 again on NOVA/ – 16 years on air, daily show
  - Producer
- You Have Got Mail (C'e Posta Per Te – original format of Maria de Filippi, broadcast on Canale 5 in Italy) – broadcast on the national NOVA TV during 2005–2008 and then again in 2012–2013 (4 seasons, about 170 episodes)
  - Producer
- Sweet Revenge (Candid Camera) – broadcast on the national TV channel bTV from 2005 (5 seasons, 204 episodes); Season 6 (4 episodes) aired on NOVA in 2020, but terminated due to the emergency situation with COVID-19.
  - Producer and director; producer of Season 6
- Fatal Attraction – broadcast on TV channel MSAT in 2002 (16 episodes)
  - Producer and director
- Crossing Point – broadcast on TV channel MSAT from 1999 (3 seasons, about 300 episodes)
  - Producer and director
- Russian Roulette (original format of Sony Pictures Television International) – broadcast on Bulgarian National Television in 2003 (about 209 episodes)
  - Co-producer

=== Commercials ===
He has directed more than 100 commercial spots for products of cosmetic, food and fashion industries, for plenty of alcohol manufacturers, financial and investment institutions. Among the clients are the mobile operators "Mtel" and "Globul", "UniCredit Bulbank", "Post Bank", "DZI Bank", "Societe Generale Express bank", "Petrol", "Allianz" Bulgaria, the chain stores "2Be", "Domaine Boyar", "Kamenitza", "Kraft Foods" Bulgaria, "Nikas-Bulgaria", "Happy Bar&Grill" restaurants, "Rubella", "Aroma", PLC "Doverie", "Madoc Jeans", Ministry of Health, etc.

=== Music videos ===
He has shot more than 500 music videos for performers from all music styles among which are Slavi Trifonov, Antique, BTR, Signal, Kiril Marichkov, Azis, TE, Milena Slavova, Doni and Momchil, Irra, Akaga, Stoyan Mihalev, Irina Florin, etc.

He has worked for Warner Music Italy as a director of the video of the group Kitchen Funk and for EMI and the German group 666.

In December 2006 Halvadjian shot a video also for the Hollywood star Hilary Duff. The video was broadcast on MTV and it is a part of the soundtrack of the movie Brand Hauser in which Hilary Duff is one of the famous names along with John Cusack, Ben Kingsley and Marisa Tomei.

In August 2008 he took part in the shooting of the new movie of Dolf Lundgren Command Performance. An important scene was given to him, in which during an impressive concert where the Russian President is also present, terrorists invade the place. Magy Halvadjian was chosen to shoot the three musical clips within the film based on his music video experience.

== Sources ==
- http://www.pleven.utre.bg/2015/09/10/338002-magi_halvadzhian_pred_plevenutrebg_za_x_factor_pleven_i_istinata_za_uspeha
