= Dimitar Rachkov =

Bulgarian actor and television host

- Димитър Рачков
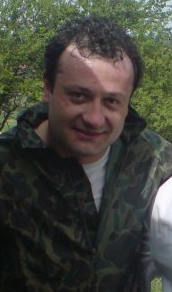
- Rachkov in 2010
- Born: Dimitar Minkov Rachkov; 18 September 1972 (age 53); Burgas, People's Republic of Bulgaria
- Occupations: Actor, television host
- Years active: 1994–present
- Partner: Zueka
- Children: 1

Dimitar Minkov Rachkov (Bulgarian: Димитър Рачков, 18 September 1972, Burgas, Bulgaria) is a Bulgarian actor and television host, including on the show Gospodari Na Efira (Lords of the Air).

== Career ==
He graduated from the National Academy in 1995 in the class of Prof. E. Gurova Professor Pl. Markov. He has worked in Sliven DT, DT Varna LBT "Off the Channel" and from 1998 he was in the troupe of the Ivan Vazov National Theatre, which he left in 2009. He became known for his roles in the show UFO Club (spoken "Klub NLO", in Bulgarian "Клуб НЛО"). He is currently the host of TV show "Lords of the Air" and is the voice of Uncle Brother ("Bay Bradar"), whose speech makes Bourgas image more colorful. He also starred in Full Madhouse (spoken "Pulna Ludnitsa", in Bulgarian "Пълна лудница") and presents images such as: Nicky Punchev (Nicky Kanchev) and himself in Show of Pachkov(In Bulgarian "Шоуто на Рачков") as well as characters from Sakaz "(a parody of Turkish Series "Gumus" - in English "Pearl") - Rachkur and Shmarkan, where he starred with Maria Ignatova.

== Awards ==
- Award-winning actor of theater festivals Blagoevgrad '99 'for the priest in "Masonry and Pop"(In Bulgarian "Зидарите и Попа").
- "Asker" 2000 for rising star man in "The Fugitive Airplane"(In Bulgarian "Самолетът беглец").

== Roles ==
Role	Production	Year
Dochko Bulgurov	Patriarchy (Патриархат)	2005
Georges	Sea Salt (Морска сол)	2005
	Papa Giovanni - Ioannes XXIII	2002
	The Profession of Arms (Занаятът на оръжията)	2001
