= Lucky 7 =

Lucky 7 or Lucky Seven may refer to:

== Film and television ==
- I Can See Your Voice (South Korean season 7), the seventh season of the program of the same name, also alternatively named I Can See Your Voice Lucky 7
- Lucky 7 (film), a 2003 television film starring Kimberly Williams and Patrick Dempsey
- Lucky 7 (TV series), a 2013 American drama series
- Lucky Seven (TV series), a 2012 Japanese drama series starring Jun Matsumoto and Eita
- Lucky Seven (The Price Is Right), a pricing game on the American game show The Price Is Right
- Lucky 7 (pirate TV station), the first known pirate television station in the U.S.

== Games ==
- Lucky Seven (game), a game played with drink coasters.
- Lucky 7, a former Australian lottery game.
- Lucky 7, a fictional item in Mario Kart 7.
- Lucky 7 (or Lucky 7s), a type of pull-tab gambling ticket.
- Lucky Seven, the weapon wielded by the protagonist of Xenoblade Chronicles 3 Noah.

== Music ==
- Lucky 7 (band), an American pop-punk band
- Lucky 7 (Chisato Moritaka album), 1993
- Lucky 7 (The Reverend Horton Heat album), 2002
- Lucky 7 (Statik Selektah album), 2015
- Lucky 7, a Roberto Roena album
- Lucky Seven (Bob James album), 1979
- Lucky Seven (Rockapella album), 1996
- Lucky 7 Records, a UK record label established by the band Madness
- Project Lucky Seven, the working title for Payback, a 2012 album by Danny!
- "Lucky Seven", a 1930 song by Howard Dietz and Arthur Schwartz
- "Lucky Seven", a song by AKB48, a B-side of the single "Heavy Rotation"
- "Lucky Seven", a song by Chris Squire from Fish Out of Water

== Other uses ==
- USS Hope (AH-7), nicknamed Lucky 7, a U.S. Navy ship 1943–1946
- Lucky Seven, an American supermarket chain operated by Market Basket
- Lucky Seven, a custom cap and crest company owned and run by Jay Burridge
- Lucky-7, Czech CubeSat satellite launched in 2019
- Lucky 7, Nippon Professional Baseball's version of the seventh-inning stretch

== See also ==
- Lucky Number Slevin, a 2006 film
- Lucky (disambiguation)
- But see "Natural or Seven out" in Craps
