= I Can See Your Voice (South Korean game show) season 4 =

Television game show season

I Can See Your Voice
- Season 4
- Starring: Jang Do-yeon; Kim Sang-hyuk (Click-B); Lee Sang-min; Joon Park (g.o.d); Shindong (Super Junior)
- Hosted by: Kim Jong-kook; Leeteuk (Super Junior); Yoo Se-yoon
- Winners: Good singers: 9; Bad singers: 9
- No. of episodes: Regular: 18; Special: 1; Overall: 19

Release
- Original network: Mnet; tvN
- Original release: March 2 – July 6, 2017

Season chronology
- ← Previous; Season 3 Next → Season 5

The fourth season of the South Korean television mystery music game show I Can See Your Voice premiered on Mnet and tvN on March 2, 2017.

== Gameplay ==
=== Format ===
For its game phase, the guest artist(s) must attempt to eliminate bad singers after each round. At the end of a game, the last remaining mystery singer is revealed as either good or bad by means of a duet between them and one of the guest artists.

If the last remaining mystery singer is good, they are granted to release a digital single; if a singer is bad, they win ₩5,000,000.

=== Rounds ===
1. Visual round
  Each mystery singer is given two different identities as a good and bad singer, with one of them is a real identity.
2. Lip sync round
  A mystery singer and a substitute lip sync together in a single song, with one of them is an owner of that recording.
3. Rehearsal round
  Three random panelists are wearing headphones to listen to a recording of assigned mystery singer that lasts for 30 seconds. Afterward, the panelist defends the mystery singer and convince the guest artist to choose them for a final performance.

== Episodes ==
=== Guest artists ===
Legend:
Good singer
Bad singer

Episode		Guest artist (Note: Players' notes: For the returning guest artists (who also include foreigners and former good singers), names are displayed in italics.; For the mixed groups, names who identified as bad singers are displayed in italics.)	Mystery singers (In their respective numbers and aliases)					
#	Date	Guest artist	Elimination order					Winner
#	Date	Guest artist	Visual round	Lip sync round		Rehearsal round		Winner
1	March 2, 2017	Kim Jong-kook	4. Hwang Hyun-joon	3. (Germany) Adria Costa	5. Park Je-up	2. Lee Sung-jin	1. Choi Byung-hwa	6. Hyun Gyu-bi
2	March 9, 2017	Haha and Skull	1. Kim Da-woon	2. (Brazil) Maria Fabiana	3. Kim Kyung-hyun	5. Tak Hong-joo	4. Yeni Park	6. (Republic of the Congo) Rabi Thona
3	March 16, 2017	Koyote	6. Naomi	2. Kim Young-nam	4. Jeong Jae-min	3. Choi Ah-reum	5. Kim Min-kyu	1. Han Geon
4	March 23, 2017	Got7	4. Won Yoo-bin	5. (United States) Brie Jackson and Candice Marius	2. DJ Han Min	3. Choi Jin-ho	1. Baek Seung-yeol	6. Shim Gyu-hyuk and Lee Dong-hoon
5	March 30, 2017	Lyn	1. Han So-ah	5. Yoo Seung-hoon	3. Louis Choi	2. Kim Dal-woo	6. Jo Yoon-jeong	4. Jun Ha-young
6	April 6, 2017	Roy Kim	3. (Australia) Romin Khazai	5. Han Je-won	4. Bang Hyun-ah	6. Kim Jae-eun	1. Shin Ho-rim	2. Kim Dan-yool
7	April 13, 2017	H.O.T.	2. Jim Turner	1. Cho Joon-young	5. Park Jun-hee	6. Kim Ye-rin	4. Oh Dong-won	3. Yoo Ga-yeon and Han Hye-young
8	April 20, 2017	Super Junior (Note: Season highlights: Super Junior (ep. 8) designated as new players, which also include host Leeteuk and panelist Shindong.; Good singer Hwang Chi-yeul (ep. 16) also returned, playing as a guest artist.)	4. Kim Hyun-soo	3. Jang Hyun-gi	2. Lee So-min	5. Lee Ha-rin	6. (United States) EXP Edition	1. Joe Song
9	April 27, 2017	EXID	5. Jeon Ye-kyung	6. Im Su-jin and Kim Ye-hoon	3. In Seon-gyo	1. Ryu Ki-haeng	4. Choi Sung-hoon	2. Kim Hee-soo
10	May 4, 2017	Highlight	1. Kim Ji-soo	3. Park Sung-yeon	4. Jeon Tae-ho	5. Seo Seok-jin, Jung Sung-cheol, and Lee Seung-yoo	6. (United States) Kim Ba-wool	2. Jeong Sa-gang and Lee Eun-sung
11	May 11, 2017	Roo'ra	3. Lee Eun-joo	1. Seo Chae-woo	5. Seo Hang	4. Kim Yoon-ah	2. Jang Hyung-woo	6. Lee Ji-hye
12	May 18, 2017	Kim Won-jun	2. Lee Sung-shin	3. (Mongolia) Gantolga Hishigduren	1. Ryeon Jin	5. Jeon Ga-young and Lee Eun-bi	6. (United States) Eddy Oh	4. Kim Nam-ho
13	May 25, 2017	Twice	3. Park Da-eun	4. Lee Hee-joon	5. (Brazil) Gabriel	2. Kim Hyo-young	1. Shi Min-seom	6. Hong Nam-hwa, Ahn Sung-hyun, and Kim Dong-young
14	June 1, 2017	Kim Kyung-ho	1. Lee Jeong-bin	2. SunBee	4. Yang Joon-hyuk	6. Jin Bo-ra	3. Oh Sang-eun	5. Kim Geon
15	June 8, 2017	F.T. Island	4. Park Tae-jeong	2. Moon Kyung-tak	6. Kim Na-hyun	1. Lee Min-young	3. Kim Dong-hee	5. Bae Sung-woo
16	June 15, 2017	Hwang Chi-yeul	2. Maeng Ji-na	5. Im Shin-taek	6. Ahn Ye-won	4. Lee Hee-won	1. Lee Woong-yeol	3. Kim Yeon-dae
17	June 22, 2017	Yoon Do-hyun	2. Park Jin-hoon	5. Ahn Jung-jae	4. Beom Sang-gil	3. Son Hae-ri	6. Blue Umbrella	1. Park Min-joo
18	June 29, 2017	Clon	2. Heo Sung-jeong	1. Lee Hee-joo	4. Kim Mi-ok	6. Son Jin-young, Monk Neung-in, and Kim Min-gyu	3. Yeom Yuri	5. Heo Wan-young and Nam San

=== Panelists ===
Legend:
Regular panelist
Additional panelist
Guest panelist

Apps		Panelists in attendance (Sorted by first appearance, with episode designations)
g#	p#	Panelists in attendance (Sorted by first appearance, with episode designations)
18	2	Jang Do-yeon and Kim Sang-hyuk (Click B) (1–18)
17	1	Shindong (Super Junior) (1–7, 9–18)
13	1	Lee Sang-min (4–8, 10, 12–18)
9	1	Joon Park (g.o.d) (4–5, 8, 11, 13–14, 16–18)
5	1	Solbin (Laboum) (1–3, 9, 15)
3	3	Chun Myung-hoon (1–2, 7); Kim So-hee (I.B.I) (3, 11, 18); Hong Rok-gi (11, 14, 18)
2	8	Kim Jong-nam (Turbo) (1–2); Chae Yeon (1, 16); Zizo (2, 4); Jeon So-mi (I.O.I) (4–5); Cao Lu (Fiestar) (8, 10); Sung Dae-hyun (R.ef) (11, 14); Boom (12–13); Kangnam (15–16)
1	37	Heo Young-ji, Kim Na-young, and Mikey (Turbo) (1); Ji Sang-ryeol and Kim Chung-ha (I.O.I) (2); Noh Yoo-min, Park Hwi-soon, Park Mi-sun, and Shin Hyun-woo (3); Seol Ha-yoon (4); Danji and JeA (Brown Eyed Girls) (5); Hyojung (Oh My Girl), Joo Woo-jae, Kim Jae-woo, and Shin Bo-ra (6); Hong Seok-cheon, J-Min, Soomin (Awe5omeBaby), and Yoo Jae-hwan (7); Ben and Sam Okyere (Note: Panelists' note: Foreign attendee: Sam Okyere (GHA)) (8); Han Hee-jun, Jang Dong-min, Kim Jong-min, Shinsadong Tiger, and Yezi (Fiestar) (9); Niel (Teen Top) and Moon Se-yoon (10); Nayoung (PRISTIN) (11); Choi Holley and Kim Jin (12); Jae Park (Day6) and Jo Kwon (13); Hwang Bo-mi (14); Rowoon (SF9) (15); G2, Jeong Ga-eun, and Kim Jeong-geun (17); Park Mi-kyung (18)

== Postseason Showcase (July 6, 2017) ==
Also in this season, a first postseason showcase was aired one week after its final game, featuring a montage of mystery singer performances, as well as an encore concert headlined by some of invited mystery singers for the past seasons.

I Can See Your Voice season 4 — Postseason Showcase
Performer(s)	Song(s)
Encore concert
Lee Yoon-ah (s2 ep. 7)	"As You Live" (살다 보면) — Cha Ji-yeon; Seopyeonje OST
Park Jun-young (s2 ep. 9) and Kim Kyung-hyun (s4 ep. 2)	Both performing on their own songs; "Tears From the Edge of Sky" (하늘 끝에서 흘린 눈물) — as Junyfore; "Don't Cry" — as member of The Cross
Kim Min-kyu and Kim Ye-rin (s4 eps. 3, 7)	"All for You" — Seo In-guk and Jung Eun-ji; Reply 1997 OST
Kim Joon-hwi (s3 ep. 1) and Lee Woong-yeol (s4 ep. 16)	"That's Only My World" (그것만이 내 세상) — Deulgukhwa
Lee Gyu-ra (s2 ep. 11) Choi Jin-ho (s4 ep. 4)	"Falling Slowly" — Glen Hansard and Markéta Irglová
Rankings
Top 5 performances from various genres	Top 5 revisited stars
1. Lee Yoon-ah (s2 ep. 10); 2. Jung Jae-min (s4 ep. 3); 3. Kim Joon-soo (s3 ep. 6); 4. Goo Hyun-mo (of Uangel Voice) (s3 ep. 3); 5. Maytree (s3 ep. 11)	1. Park Joon-young (s2 ep. 9); 2. Kim Kyung-hyun (s4 ep. 2); 3. Soulstar (s3 ep. 10); 4. Kim Yong-jin (s2 ep. 7); 5. Koonta (s3 ep. 12)
Top 6 Naul generation singers	Top 5 wrong eliminations
1. Bang Sung-woo (s1 ep. 3); 2. Kwon Min-je (s1 ep. 9); 3. Kim Min-seok (s2 ep. 1); 4. Shin Hyun-woo (s2 ep. 4); 5. Park Young-woo (s3 ep. 9); 6. Oh Dong-won (s4 ep. 7)	1. Lee Sun-bin (s3 ep. 5); 2. Kim Min-kyu (s4 ep. 3); 3. Im Shin-taek (s4 ep. 16); 4. Bang Se-jin (s1 ep. 2); 5. Kim Ye-rin (s4 ep. 7)
Top 8 legendary participants
1. Hwang Chi-yeul (s1 ep. 2); 2. Jeon Sang-geun (s2 ep. 14); 3. Kim Cheong-il (s2 ep. 1); 4. Choi Jin-ho (s4 ep. 4); 5. Moon Ha-neul (s3 ep. 8); 6. Kim Ki-tae (s2 ep. 5) and Kim Joon-hwi (s3 ep. 1); 7. Jeon Tae-ho (s4 ep. 10); 8. Lee Woong-yeol (s4 ep. 16)

== Reception ==
Legend:
Highest rated episode
Lowest rated episode

No.	Title	Air date	Timeslot (KST)	AGB Ratings			TNmS Ratings		
No.	Title	Air date	Timeslot (KST)	Mnet	tvN	Comb.	Mnet	tvN	Comb.
1	"Kim Jong-kook"	March 2, 2017	Thursday, 9:40 pm	0.6%	1.977%	2.577%	0.5%	1.5%	2%
2	"Haha and Skull"	March 9, 2017	Thursday, 9:40 pm	0.5%	1.543%	2.043%	0.2%	1.3%	1.5%
3	"Koyote"	March 16, 2017	Thursday, 9:40 pm	0.7%	2.308%	3.008%	0.5%	1.7%	2.2%
4	"Got7"	March 23, 2017	Thursday, 9:40 pm	0.5%	1.79%	2.29%	0.5%	1.2%	1.7%
5	"Lyn"	March 30, 2017	Thursday, 9:40 pm	0.7%	1.818%	2.518%	0.7%	2.7%	3.4%
6	"Roy Kim"	April 6, 2017	Thursday, 9:40 pm	0.6%	1.815%	2.415%	0.6%	1.9%	2.5%
7	"H.O.T."	April 13, 2017	Thursday, 9:40 pm	0.4%	1.839%	2.239%	0.5%	2.4%	2.9%
8	"Super Junior"	April 20, 2017	Thursday, 9:40 pm	0.7%	1.879%	2.579%	0.9%	1.9%	2.8%
9	"EXID"	April 27, 2017	Thursday, 9:40 pm	0.6%	1.942%	2.542%	0.7%	2%	2.7%
10	"Highlight"	May 4, 2017	Thursday, 9:40 pm	1%	2.086%	3.086%	1.2%	2.3%	3.5%
11	"Roo'ra"	May 11, 2017	Thursday, 9:40 pm	0.8%	2.351%	3.151%	0.9%	2.3%	3.2%
12	"Kim Won-jun"	May 18, 2017	Thursday, 9:40 pm	0.6%	1.486%	2.086%	0.4%	1.7%	2.1%
13	"Twice"	May 25, 2017	Thursday, 9:40 pm	0.5%	1.607%	2.107%	0.6%	1.7%	2.3%
14	"Kim Kyung-ho"	June 1, 2017	Thursday, 9:40 pm	0.6%	1.793%	2.393%	0.8%	2.1%	2.9%
15	"FT Island"	June 8, 2017	Thursday, 9:40 pm	0.6%	1.561%	2.161%	0.7%	1.6%	2.3%
16	"Hwang Chi-yeul"	June 15, 2017	Thursday, 9:40 pm	0.6%	2.338%	2.938%	0.7%	2%	2.7%
17	"Yoon Do-hyun"	June 22, 2017	Thursday, 9:40 pm	0.8%	2.135%	2.935%	0.6%	1.6%	2.2%
18	"Clon"	June 29, 2017	Thursday, 9:40 pm	0.6%	2.164%	2.764%	0.7%	2.3%	3%
Special	"Postseason Showcase"	July 6, 2017	Thursday, 9:40 pm	0.7%	2.21%	2.91%	0.9%	2.3%	3.2%

Sources: Nielsen Media Research and TNmS
