= I Can See Your Voice (South Korean game show) season 5 =

Television game show season

I Can See Your Voice
- Season 5
- Starring: Jang Do-yeon; Kim Sang-hyuk (Click-B); Lee Sang-min; Joon Park (g.o.d); Shindong (Super Junior)
- Hosted by: Main: Kim Jong-kook; Leeteuk (Super Junior); Yoo Se-yoon; Guest: Lee Sang-min (Note: Season highlights: All of six mystery singers for the Global Invasion special have also returned on their 2nd game as foreigners: Atanas Paskalev, Milka Tatareva (from Bulgarian 1st season); Bernard Kwo (from Malaysian Mandarin-language 2nd season; John Lee Diaz, Sephy Francisco (from the Philippine 1st season); and Shasapan (from Thai 1st season).; Kim Ki-hwan, a singer who performed as lip sync substitute for the winning bad singer Ra In-seung (ep. 4), made his appearance in the postseason showcase.; In 5th episode, panelist Lee Sang-min became an interim host replacing Yoo Se-yoon, who he also played as a guest artist having part of UV.)
- Winners: Good singers: 4; Bad singers: 8
- No. of episodes: Regular: 11; Special: 2; Overall: 13

Release
- Original network: Mnet; tvN
- Original release: January 26 – April 27, 2018

Season chronology
- ← Previous; Season 4 Next → Season 6

The fifth season of the South Korean television mystery music game show I Can See Your Voice premiered on Mnet and tvN with a Global Invasion special on January 26, 2018.

== Gameplay ==
=== Format ===
For its game phase, the guest artist(s) must attempt to eliminate bad singers after each round. At the end of a game, the last remaining mystery singer is revealed as either good or bad by means of a duet between them and one of the guest artists. (Note: Gameplay note: In the Global Invasion special, their gameplay from 1st to 2nd season was reused.)

If the last remaining mystery singer is good, they are granted to release a digital single; if a singer is bad, they win ₩5,000,000. For the Global Invasion special, the winning mystery singer, regardless of being good or bad, receives a trophy.

=== Rounds ===
1. Visual round
  - The guest artist is given some time to observe and examine each mystery singer based on their appearance.
  - Each mystery singer is given two different identities a good and bad singer, with one of them is a real identity.
2. Lip sync round
  - Each mystery singer performs a lip sync to a song; good singers mime to a recording of their own, while bad singers mime to a backing track by another vocalist.
  - A mystery singer and a substitute lip sync together in a single song, with one of them is an owner of that recording.
3. 1. Evidence round
  A proof of each mystery singer's singing ability (i.e. photo, video, certificates, etc.) is shown on the screen. Good singers have own evidences, while bad singers have their evidences fabricated.
3. 2. Rehearsal round
  Three random panelists are wearing headphones to listen to a recording of assigned mystery singer that lasts for 15 seconds. Afterward, the panelist defends the mystery singer and convince the guest artist to choose them for a final performance.

== Episodes ==
=== Guest artists ===
Legend:
Good singer
Bad singer

Episode		Guest artist (Note: Players' notes: For the returning guest artists (who also include foreigners and former good singers), names are displayed in italics.; For the mixed groups, names who identified as bad singers are displayed in italics.)	Mystery singers (In their respective numbers and aliases)					
#	Date	Guest artist	Elimination order					Winner
#	Date	Guest artist	Visual round	Lip sync round		Rehearsal round		Winner
Special	January 26, 2018	Block B	3. (Bulgaria) Atanas Paskalev	1. (Malaysia) Bernard Kwo	2. (Philippines) Sephy Francisco	5. (Philippines) John Lee Diaz	6. (Bulgaria) Milka Tatareva	4. (Thailand) Shasapan
1	February 2, 2018	The Music Works (Baek Ji-young, Minzy (2NE1), Gilgu Bonggu, U Sung-eun, Kim So-hee, and Yuvin (Myteen))	2. Lee Dong-hyun	5. Park Bo-sung	3. Choi Shin-hye	4. (Austria) David Lee	1. Jung So-young	6. Ji Ye-song and Noh Ah
Season break: February 9 episode was pre-empted to give way for the airing of 2018 Winter Olympics opening ceremony.
2	February 16, 2018	Wanna One	1. (Bangladesh) Taufiq Tamim	3. Wang Ji-hyun	5. Kim Roo-ah and Go Young-bin	6. Yoon Ji-young	2. Park Chae-eun	4. Sung Chang-yong and Sung Yoo-yong
3	February 23, 2018	Red Velvet	1. Jeon Ye-im	2. (United Kingdom) Laura Emmitt	4. Ji Dong-kuk	6. Song Han-hee and Bolly	5. Han Seo-joon	3. Choi Young-won
4	March 2, 2018	JYP Family (Wooyoung (2PM), Yubin (Wonder Girls), JB (Got7), Baek A-yeon, and Wonpil (Day6))	4. Han Ye-seul	3. Kim Kyung-hwan	6. Chae Bong-won	2. Jang Bo-ram	1. Lim Chae-yeon	5. Ra In-seung
5	March 9, 2018	UV	4. Park Se-eun	1. Park Doo-han	3. Kim Min-soo	6. Im Chae-geon	2. Hong Hye-rang and Choi Bo-yoon	5. Son Sung-ho, Lee In-ho, and Kim Dong-seok
6	March 16, 2018	Mamamoo	3. (Russia) Anastasia Peresypkina	4. Kang Hyo-joon	5. Lee Dong-ha	2. Lee Gi-taek and Jung Goo-young	6. Kang Eun-young, Seo Min-kyung, and Kim Ye-won	1. Jung Eun-joo
7	March 23, 2018	Jo Jung-chi and Choi Jung-in	4. Shin Gyung-sik	1. Choi Han-wool	2. Hong Yoo-jin	6. Ganeung-dong Band	3. (United States) Kisung Anderson	5. Lee Min-song and Yang Hye-in
8	March 30, 2018	TVXQ	4. Kim Jin-woo	2. Kim Juri	5. (Uruguay) Mika Rivero	1. Ahn Yong-joon and Kwon Seon-hee	6. Park Jin and Yoon Seok-chan	3. Bang Hak-hyun
9	April 6, 2018	Ha Dong-kyun and Wheesung	5. Oh Young-mi	6. Jeon Sung-min, Kang Myung-hyun and Oh Seok	1. Sung Seu-chan and Jung Goo-hyung	4. Im Chan-woo	2. Lee Ji-in	3. Yoon Ji-young
10	April 13, 2018	NU'EST W	1. Joo Dae-geon	2. Yoo Sung-nyeo	5. Yoo Han-gyeol	6. Choi Joel and (United States) Carson Allen	4. Im Joon-hyuk	3. Sang Yoon-do
11	April 20, 2018	Kim Jong-seo, Kim Tae-won, Kim Kyung-ho, and Park Wan-kyu	3. Lee Hyun-woo	2. Kim Choo-ri	6. Yoo Min-ah	4. Wang Han-eol and Wang Han-som	1. Han Seom-hee	5. Kim Hee-dong and Hong Seok-won

=== Panelists ===
Legend:
Regular panelist
Additional panelist
Guest panelist

Apps		Panelists in attendance (Sorted by first appearance, with episode designations)
g#	p#	Panelists in attendance (Sorted by first appearance, with episode designations)
12	4	Joon Park (g.o.d), Kim Sang-hyuk (Click-B), Lee Sang-min, and Shindong (Super Junior) (1–11; sp. 1)
6	1	Jang Do-yeon (2–3, 6, 9–10; sp. 1)
2	5	Microdot (1; sp. 1); Park Seul-gi (2, 4); Go Jang-hwan (3, 6); YooA (Oh My Girl) (6, 11); Jang Moon-bok (10–11)
1	34	Han Hyun-min and Kim Min-seok (MeloMance) (sp. 1); Jeon Sang-geun, Jeong Ga-eun, and Kim Ji-sook (1); Kassy, Kim Joo-hee, and Šime (EXP EDITION) (Note: Panelists' note: Foreign attendees: Šime (EXP Edition) (HRV) and Alberto Mondi (ITA)) (2); Dong Hyun Kim and Zairo (3); Kwon Hyuk-soo and Lee Ha-rin (4); Kim Young-hee, Kim Heung-gook, Lee Jeong-seok, and Park Jung-ah (5); Jeup (IMFACT) and Kim Jeong-geun (6); Giant Pink, Narsha (Brown Eyed Girls), Parc Jae-jung, and Roh Ji-sun (Fromis 9) (7); Kim So-hee, Lee Yoon-ah, Alberto Mondi, and Yoo Ho-seok (8); Eden, Kim Min-kyu, and Park Ji-heon (V.O.S) (9); Im Jin-mo and Jeong Sa-gang (The East Light) (10); Bang Se-jin, Han Hee-jun, and Lee Guk-joo (11)

== Postseason Showcase (April 27, 2018) ==
Also in this season, a second postseason showcase was aired one week after its final game, featuring a montage of mystery singer performances, as well as an encore concert headlined by some of invited mystery singers for the past seasons.

I Can See Your Voice season 5 — Postseason Showcase
Performer(s)	Song(s)
Encore concert
Yoon Ji-young (s5 ep. 2)	"Don't Know You" (널 너무 모르고) — Heize
Lim Chae-yeon (s5 ep. 4)	"Longing" (동경) — Park Hyo-shin
Lee Dong-ha (s5 ep. 6)	"Too Good at Goodbyes" — Sam Smith
Ji Dong-kuk (s5 ep. 3)	"Lean On" (빌려줄게) — Shin Yong-jae
Rankings
Top 5 wrong eliminations	Top 5 wildest voices
1. David Lee (s5 ep. 2); 2. Moon Ha-neul (s3 ep. 8); 3. Kim Jin-woo (s5 ep. 9); 4. Yeni Park (s4 ep. 2); 5. Yoon Ji-young (s5 ep. 3)	1. Kim Ki-hwan (s5 ep. 5); 2. Lim Chae-yeon (s5 ep. 5); 3. (United States) Brie Jackson and Candice Marius (s4 ep. 4); 4. Soulstar (s3 ep. 10); 5. Yoon Ji-young (s5 ep. 10)
Top 5 great performances	Top 5 creative performances
1. Lee Dong-ha (s5 ep. 7); 2. Choi Hyung-gwan (s2 ep. 6); 3. Kang Hyo-joon (s5 ep. 7); 4. Seo Bo-sung (s3 ep. 7); 5. Park Soo-ho (s2 ep. 4)	1. Seo Chae-woo (s4 ep.1); 2. Kang Eun-young, Seo Min-kyung, and Kim Ye-won (s5 ep. 7); 3. Son Sung-ho, Lee In-ho, and Kim Dong-seok (s5 ep. 6); 4. Park Jun-hee (s4 ep. 7); 5. Seo Seok-jin, Jung Sung-cheol, and Lee Seung-yoo (s4 ep. 10)
Top 5 tear makers	Bad singer ranking compilations
1. Seo Hang (s4 ep. 11); 2. Jeon Ye-im (s5 ep. 4); 3. Ji Dong-gook (s5 ep. 4); 4. Kim Yeon-dae (s4 ep. 16); 5. Lee Jeong-seok (s3 ep. 11)	Duet performances: 1. Hyun Gyu-bi (s4 ep. 1); 2. Sung Chang-yong and Sung Yoo-yong (s5 ep. 3); Locals: 1. DJ Han Min (s4 ep. 4); 2. Beom Sang-gil (s4 ep. 17); Foreigners: 1. (United States) Kesung Anderson (s5 ep. 8); 2. (Republic of the Congo) Rabbi Thona (s4 ep. 2); 3. (United States) Joel (s2 ep. 2)
Top 5 celebrity lip sync performances	Duet performances: 1. Hyun Gyu-bi (s4 ep. 1); 2. Sung Chang-yong and Sung Yoo-yong (s5 ep. 3); Locals: 1. DJ Han Min (s4 ep. 4); 2. Beom Sang-gil (s4 ep. 17); Foreigners: 1. (United States) Kesung Anderson (s5 ep. 8); 2. (Republic of the Congo) Rabbi Thona (s4 ep. 2); 3. (United States) Joel (s2 ep. 2)
1. Kang Daniel (s5 ep. 3); 2. Shindong (of Super Junior) (s5 ep. 6); 3. Jang Do-yeon (s5 ep. 1); 4. Baek Ji-young (s5 ep. 2); 5. Ha Dong-kyun and Wheesung (s5 ep. 10)	Duet performances: 1. Hyun Gyu-bi (s4 ep. 1); 2. Sung Chang-yong and Sung Yoo-yong (s5 ep. 3); Locals: 1. DJ Han Min (s4 ep. 4); 2. Beom Sang-gil (s4 ep. 17); Foreigners: 1. (United States) Kesung Anderson (s5 ep. 8); 2. (Republic of the Congo) Rabbi Thona (s4 ep. 2); 3. (United States) Joel (s2 ep. 2)

== Reception ==
Legend:
Highest rated episode
Lowest rated episode

No.	Title	Air date	Timeslot (KST)	AGB Ratings			TNmS Ratings		
No.	Title	Air date	Timeslot (KST)	Mnet	tvN	Comb.	Mnet	tvN	Comb.
Special	"Block B"	January 26, 2018	Friday, 9:40 pm	0.8%	2.771%	3.571%	0.9%	2.8%	3.7%
1	"The Music Works"	February 2, 2018	Friday, 9:40 pm	0.7%	3.014%	3.714%	0.8%	2.5%	3.3%
2	"Wanna One"	February 16, 2018	Friday, 9:40 pm	1.1%	2.526%	3.626%	0.8%	2.4%	3.2%
3	"Red Velvet"	February 23, 2018	Friday, 9:40 pm	0.3%	1.1%	1.4%	0.2%	1.3%	1.5%
4	"JYP Family"	March 2, 2018	Friday, 9:40 pm	0.6%	2.523%	3.123%	0.6%	2%	2.6
5	"UV"	March 9, 2018	Friday, 9:40 pm	0.7%	2.543%	3.243%	0.7%	2.8%	3.5%
6	"Mamamoo"	March 16, 2018	Friday, 9:40 pm	0.7%	2.79%	3.49%	0.5%	2.8%	3.3%
7	"Jo Jung-chi and Choi Jung-in"	March 23, 2018	Friday, 9:40 pm	0.5%	2.767%	3.267%	0.8%	2.3%	3.1%
8	"TVXQ"	March 30, 2018	Friday, 9:40 pm	0.6%	2.065%	2.665%	0.6%	2.3%	2.9%
9	"Ha Dong-kyun and Wheesung"	April 6, 2018	Friday, 9:40 pm	0.6%	2.048%	2.648%	0.5%	2%	2.5%
10	"NU'EST W"	April 13, 2018	Friday, 9:40 pm	0.6%	1.863%	2.463%	0.6%	2%	2.6%
11	"Kim Jong-seo, Kim Tae-won, Kim Kyung-ho, and Park Wan-kyu"	April 20, 2018	Friday, 9:40 pm	0.5%	2.259%	2.759%	0.6%	2%	2.6%
Special	"Postseason Showcase"	April 27, 2018	Friday, 9:40 pm	0.5%	1.402%	1.902%	0.5%	1.4%	1.9%

Sources: Nielsen Media Research and TNmS
