= I Can See Your Voice (South Korean game show) season 8 =

Television game show season

I Can See Your Voice
- Season 8
- Promotional poster
- Starring: Heo Kyung-hwan; Hong Yoon-hwa; Jang Wooyoung (2PM); Hanhae; Kim Ji-sook; Kim Sang-hyuk (Click-B); Mijoo (Lovelyz); Lee Sang-min
- Hosted by: Kim Jong-kook; Leeteuk (Super Junior); Yoo Se-yoon
- Winners: Good singers: 7; Bad singers: 5
- No. of episodes: 12

Release
- Original network: Mnet; tvN
- Original release: January 29 – April 16, 2021

Season chronology
- ← Previous; Season 7 Next → Season 9

The eighth season of the South Korean television mystery music game show I Can See Your Voice premiered on Mnet and tvN on January 29, 2021.

At the time of filming during the COVID-19 pandemic, health and safety protocols are also implemented.

== Gameplay ==
=== Format ===
For its game phase, the guest artist(s) must attempt to eliminate bad singers after each round. At the end of a game, the last remaining mystery singer is revealed as either good or bad by means of a duet between them and one of the guest artists.

If the last remaining mystery singer is good, they are granted to release a digital single; if a singer is bad, they win ₩5,000,000.

=== Rounds ===
1. Visual round
  The guest artist is given some time to observe and examine each mystery singer based on its appearance. Afterward, the host is given three "keywords" based on mystery singer's identity.
2. Lip sync round
  Each mystery singer performs a lip sync on separate phases, with the good singer's recording first, and then the bad singer's last.
3. Interrogation round
  The guest artist must pick one of three given "keywords" to question one of the mystery singers after detailing additional information about them.

== Episodes ==
=== Guest artists ===
Legend:
Good singer
Bad singer

Episode		Guest artist (Note: Players' notes: For the returning guest artists (who also include foreigners and former good singers), names are displayed in italics.; For the mixed groups, names who identified as bad singers are displayed in italics.)	Mystery singers (In their respective numbers and aliases)					
#	Date	Guest artist	Elimination order					Winner
#	Date	Guest artist	Visual round	Lip sync round		Interrogation round		Winner
1	January 29, 2021	Rain	1. Yoon Gook-hyun	5. Lee Ga-eun	6. Indra	3. Jo Yoon-sang, Im Jeong-yoon, and Song Dong	2. Baek Ji-hyun	4. Choi Jung-cheol
2	February 5, 2021	Kim Soo-ro (Note: Despite not singing, they were still counted as guest artists.)	6. Kim Sung-soo and Lee Ho-joon	2. Park Sae-im	3. Park Chang-ro	4. Lee Chung-gon	1. Jo Seung-woo	5. Kim Joo-young
3	February 12, 2021	Haha and Byul	5. Kim Ji-hoon and Ahn Hyun-jeong	2. Lee In-se	1. Wi Hyun-ji	6. Lee Hyun-ji	4. Shin Dong-jae	3. Lee Seol-ah
4	February 19, 2021	Ha Dong-kyun and Kim Feel	1. Hwang In-hyeok	3. (Ghana) Gwaska Israel and Gwaska Isak	4. Jo Da-ae	2. Song Eun-hye	5. Jo Tae-joon	6. Lee Ah-jin
5	February 26, 2021	Kang Daniel and Baek Ji-young	2. Jo Chan-woo, Jang Min-sik, and Park Moo-joo	3. (Vietnam) (United States) Cindy	1. Jo Hye-seon	5. Seo Ri-hye	4. Hyun Ji-hye and Kim Sung-wan	6. Hong Joon-ho and Lee Ji-woo
6	March 5, 2021	SHINee	2. Oh Nickita	3. Park Na-kyung	5. Sohyun	1. Lee Ji-hye and Choi Yeo-won	4. Jung Sang-ho and Choi Jong-joon	6. Yang Ji
7	March 12, 2021	Song Ga-in	3. Lee Tae-yeon, Choi Yoon-jin, and Han Eun-bi	1. Lee Sung-je and Yang Seung-min	6. Lee Young-min	5. Choi Seo-yoon and Kim So-yeon	4. Lee Jae-won	2. Bang Jeong-hoon
8	March 19, 2021	Super Junior	2. Kim Chi-young	1. Kang Yoon-jeong	6. Choi Kyung-ho, Kim Jin-hyuk, and Jung Yoo-seok	5. Lee Cheong-hoon	4. Kayla Ri	3. Lee Seung-young
9	March 26, 2021	Mamamoo	3. Oh Joon-sang	2. Bae Ji-sook	5. Lee Sang-ah	4. Shin Bo-kyung	1. Kwon Ik-hwan	6. Han Dong-jae
10	April 2, 2021	Hwang Chi-yeul (Note: Season highlight: Good singer Hwang Chi-yeul (ep. 10) also returned, playing as a guest artist.)	6. Kim Dae-hee	2. Kim Won-ki	5. Baek Se-bin	3. Kim Jae-yoon	1. Lee Han-seo	4. Kim Seok-ju
11	April 9, 2021	Jang Hyuk	5. Yoon Se-na	2. Jiaerin	4. Ha Chi-hwan	6. Kim Soo-chang	3. Kim Jae-oh, Kim Soo-bin, Jung Sung-bo, Kwon San, and Seo Geon-young	1. Kwon Ga-min
12	April 16, 2021	Ahn Jae-wook	5. Kang Yi-seok	1. (France) Laurent Bàn	3. Jung Hye-seon and Kim Do-yeon	6. Kim Geun-soo and (Vietnam) Lê Văn Chương	4. Kim Ye-eun	2. Shin Kyung-woo

=== Panelists ===
Legend:
Regular panelist
Additional panelist
Guest panelist

Apps		Panelists in attendance (Sorted by first appearance, with episode designations)
g#	p#	Panelists in attendance (Sorted by first appearance, with episode designations)
12	5	Heo Kyung-hwan, Hong Yoon-hwa, Jang Wooyoung (2PM), Kim Sang-hyuk (Click-B) and Lee Sang-min (1–12)
8	1	Mijoo (Lovelyz) (1, 4–5, 7–8, 10–12)
7	1	Hanhae (4, 6, 8–12)
6	1	Kim Ji-sook (2, 4, 6, 9–10, 12)
3	2	Na Tae-joo (1, 3, 7); Ha Sung-woon (6, 8, 11)
2	1	Joon Park (g.o.d) (1, 3)
1	15	Ciipher (Hyunbin and Tag) (1); Im Hyung-joon and Oneus (Leedo and Keonhee) (2); Lee Hyun-yi and Chuu (Loona) (3); Heo Joo (4); Park So-yul and Ace (Jun and Donghun) (5); Seo Dong-joo (6); Giant Pink and BAE173 (Yoojun, Junseo, and Hangyul) (7); Iz*One (Yena and Eunbi) and Park Chang-ro (9); Hong Kyung-min (11); Jeon Sang-geun (12)

== Reception ==
Legend:
Highest rated episode
Lowest rated episode

No.	Title	Air date	Timeslot (KST)	AGB Ratings		
No.	Title	Air date	Timeslot (KST)	Mnet	tvN	Comb.
1	"Rain"	January 29, 2021	Friday, 9:40 pm	0.4%	2.613%	3.013%
2	"Kim Soo-ro"	February 5, 2021	Friday, 9:40 pm	0.4%	2.069%	2.469%
3	"Haha and Byul"	February 12, 2021	Friday, 9:40 pm	0.6%	2.576%	3.176%
4	"Ha Dong-kyun and Kim Feel"	February 19, 2021	Friday, 9:40 pm	0.5%	2.333%	2.833%
5	"Kang Daniel and Baek Ji-young"	February 26, 2021	Friday, 9:40 pm	0.5%	2.238%	2.738%
6	"SHINee"	March 5, 2021	Friday, 9:40 pm	0.4%	1.989%	2.389%
7	"Song Ga-in"	March 12, 2021	Friday, 9:40 pm	0.5%	2.148%	2.648%
8	"Super Junior"	March 19, 2021	Friday, 9:40 pm	0.4%	1.868%	2.268%
9	"Mamamoo"	March 26, 2021	Friday, 9:40 pm	0.4%	1.743%	2.143%
10	"Hwang Chi-yeul"	April 2, 2021	Friday, 9:40 pm	0.5%	1.718%	2.218%
11	"Jang Hyuk"	April 9, 2021	Friday, 9:40 pm	0.4%	1.598%	1.998%
12	"Ahn Jae-wook"	April 16, 2021	Friday, 9:40 pm	0.5%	1.913%	2.413%

Source: Nielsen Media Research
