= I Can See Your Voice (South Korean game show) season 7 =

Television game show season

I Can See Your Voice
- Season 7
- Starring: Hong Yoon-hwa; Kim Sang-hyuk (Click-B); Sleepy (Untouchable); Lee Sang-min; DinDin; Joon Park (g.o.d)
- Hosted by: Kim Jong-kook; Leeteuk (Super Junior); Yoo Se-yoon
- Winners: Good singers: 9; Bad singers: 3
- No. of episodes: 12

Release
- Original network: Mnet; tvN
- Original release: January 17 – April 3, 2020

Season chronology
- ← Previous; Season 6 Next → Season 8

The seventh season of the South Korean television mystery music game show I Can See Your Voice premiered on Mnet and tvN on January 17, 2020.

At the time of filming during the COVID-19 pandemic, health and safety protocols are also implemented.

== Gameplay ==
=== Format ===
For its game phase, the guest artist(s) must attempt to eliminate bad singers after each round. At the end of a game, the last remaining mystery singer is revealed as either good or bad by means of a duet between them and one of the guest artists.

If the last remaining mystery singer is good, they are granted to release a digital single; if a singer is bad, they win ₩5,000,000.

=== Rounds ===
1. Visual round
  Each mystery singer is given two different identities as a good and bad singer, with one of them is a real identity.
2. Lip sync round
  The mystery singer lip syncs to the good singer's recording, then a bad singer's recording comes in the middle of the performance.
3. Evidence round
  The hosts have randomly assigned clues about the mystery singer, and then the guest artist must choose a clue for each one.

== Episodes ==
=== Guest artists ===
Legend:
Good singer
Bad singer

Episode		Guest artist (Note: Players' notes: For the returning guest artists (who also include foreigners and former good singers), names are displayed in italics.; For the mixed groups, names who identified as bad singers are displayed in italics.)	Mystery singers (In their respective numbers and aliases)					
#	Date	Guest artist	Elimination order					Winner
#	Date	Guest artist	Visual round	Lip sync round		Evidence round		Winner
1	January 17, 2020	Park Joong-hoon (Note: Despite not singing, they were still counted as guest artists.)	5. Park Yo-seop	3. Baek Young-joo	1. Heo Joo	2. (United States) Jamon Maple	6. Lee Jong-taek	4. Hwang Soo-jin
2	January 24, 2020	Hong Jin-young	6. Kim Tae-hoon	5. Nam Min-jeong	3. (Taiwan) Hong Liyen	1. (Malawi) Ella	2. Kim Sung-hoon	4. Lee Seung-hyun
3	January 31, 2020	Super Junior	1. Jang Sung-il	2. (United States) Vida Mohammad	3. Seo Seung-hyun, Jeon Il-seop, and Song Dong-woo	6. Kim Jae-beom	4. Shin Ga-eun	5. Park Jeong-hyun
4	February 7, 2020	Apink	2. Lee Seon-hye	6. Seo Eun-young	5. Lee Hyun-woo, Kang Tae-heon, Kim Doo-han, and Kim In-gyeom	1. Lee Sang-hwa	3. Lee Yoon-jae	4. Baek Seo-yool
5	February 14, 2020	Ahn Hyun-mo and Rhymer	4. Na Young-joo and Na Ha-eun	1. Lee Sang-min and Choi Byung-yeol	3. Jung Il-ho	5. Park Joon-ha	6. Lee Hye-na and Jo Jae-hwan	2. Lee Yoon-gyu
6	February 21, 2020	So Chan-whee, Hwangbo, and Kim Hyun-jung	5. Hong Seok-hoon	2. (United States) Sally	4. Park Hae-rin, Hwang Ji-soo, and Jin Hyun-bin	1. Park Gil-young	3. Yoon Da-ro	6. Han Man-cheong
7	February 28, 2020	Shin Hyun-joon	5. Jung Hyun-soo	2. Bang Hoon-sik and Lee Young-joon	6. Joo Ha-yoon	3. Park Joon-woo	1. Seo Ja-yeong	4. (France) Andrea Yang
8	March 6, 2020	Yoon Sang, Lee Hyun-woo, and Kim Hyun-chul	3. Kang Min-gyu	2. Kwon Yoo-kyung	4. (Ukraine) Maria and Olena	5. Yoon Seok-woo	6. Kim Yoon-seol	1. Lee Joo-yong and Yoo Ji-hoon
9	March 13, 2020	Noh Sa-yeon and Noh Sa-bong	1. Kwon Hyuk-joon	4. Moon Se-young	6. Jung Hee-sook	2. Lee Ki-rim and Lee Po-reum	5. Sung Young-gyu	3. Han Ji-hyun
10	March 20, 2020	Shin Seung-hun	2. Ahn Joon-heon and Lee Shin-jae	6. Lee Tae-hee	5. Go Kang-min	4. Kim Won-sik	3. Park Ji-in	1. Lee Seung-woon
11	March 27, 2020	Kim Min-jun	2. Lee Jae-moo, Lee Jae-sung, and Jung Yoon-ho	3. Kwon Ji-eun	4. Jung Woo-jin	6. Han Seung-min and Seo Do-gyeon	5. Kim Sung-wook	1. Choi Seung-hyun
12	April 3, 2020	Jaurim	1. Jang Jae-wook and Lee Gap-yong	2. Kim Jae-won	5. Seo Jae-hyun	4. Kim Byung-jin	6. Choi Joo-hoon	3. Kim On-jeong

=== Panelists ===
Legend:
Regular panelist
Additional panelist
Guest panelist

Apps		Panelists in attendance (Sorted by first appearance, with episode designations)
g#	p#	Panelists in attendance (Sorted by first appearance, with episode designations)
12	3	DinDin, Hong Yoon-hwa, and Kim Sang-hyuk (Click B) (1–12)
10	1	Lee Sang-min (3–12)
7	1	Joon Park (g.o.d) (3–8, 10)
6	1	Sleepy (Untouchable) (3–4, 6–8, 12)
4	1	Shin Ji (Koyote) (2, 9, 11–12)
2	6	Heo Kyung-hwan and Seo Kyung-seok (1–2); Sung Dae-hyun (R.ef) (6, 9); Kim Kiri (7, 10); Mijoo (Lovelyz) (7, 11); Jeong Se-woon (9–10)
1	26	Cha Seon-hyung, Lee Sung-woo (No Brain), and Seunghee (Oh My Girl) (1); Kim Won-hyo and Yoon Dae-woong (2); Kim Ji-sook and Lee Ha-rin (3); Aton and Lee Guk-joo (4); Exy (Cosmic Girls), Kanto (Troy), and MC Gree (5); Sohee (Nature) (6); Kim Ji-hyun (8); Jangjun (Golden Child) and Chuu (Loona) (9); Park Jun-woo, Rothy, and Seo Woo-jin (10); Kim Gil-joong, Yubin, Lee Tae-kyung, and Shindong (Super Junior) (11); Heo Song-yeon, Heo Young-ji, and Hwang Je-sung (12)

== Reception ==
Legend:
Highest rated episode
Lowest rated episode

No.	Title	Air date	Timeslot (KST)	AGB Ratings		
No.	Title	Air date	Timeslot (KST)	Mnet	tvN	Comb.
1	"Park Joong-hoon"	January 17, 2020	Friday, 9:40 pm	0.4%	2.683%	3.083%
2	"Hong Jin-young"	January 24, 2020	Friday, 9:40 pm	0.7%	2.865%	3.565%
3	"Super Junior"	January 31, 2020	Friday, 9:40 pm	0.4%	1.809%	2.209%
4	"Apink"	February 7, 2020	Friday, 9:40 pm	0.5%	1.6%	2.1%
5	"Ahn Hyun-mo and Rhymer"	February 14, 2020	Friday, 9:40 pm	0.4%	1.822%	2.222%
6	"So Chan-whee, Hwangbo, and Kim Hyun-jung"	February 21, 2020	Friday, 9:40 pm	0.5%	1.2%	1.7%
7	"Shin Hyun-joo"	February 28, 2020	Friday, 9:40 pm	0.6%	1.8%	2.4%
8	"Yoon Sang, Lee Hyun-woo, and Kim Hyun-chul"	March 6, 2020	Friday, 9:40 pm	0.6%	1.9%	2.5%
9	"Noh Sa-yeon and Noh Sa-bong"	March 13, 2020	Friday, 9:40 pm	0.7%	1.8%	2.5%
10	"Shin Seung-hun"	March 20, 2020	Friday, 9:40 pm	0.6%	1.8%	2.4%
11	"Kim Min-jun"	March 27, 2020	Friday, 9:40 pm	0.4%	1.6%	2%
12	"Jaurim"	April 3, 2020	Friday, 9:40 pm	0.4%	2.065%	2.465%

Source: Nielsen Media Research
