= I Can See Your Voice (South Korean game show) season 10 =

Television game show season

I Can See Your Voice
- Season 10
- Promotional poster
- Starring: Hwang Chi-yeul; Kim Sang-hyuk (Click-B); Park Myung-soo; Jonathan Yiombi
- Hosted by: Main: Kim Jong-kook; Leeteuk (Super Junior); Yoo Se-yoon; Guest: Hyojung (Oh My Girl) (Note: Season highlights: Yoshihiro Akiyama (JPN ep. 2) played as a foreign guest artist.; In 3rd episode, Kim Kyung-rok (of V.O.S) was an assistant of "surprise entrant" and winning bad singer Kim Kyung-jin for his lip sync performance.; Hyojung (of Oh My Girl) became an interim host in 4th episode replacing Leeteuk (of Super Junior), due to his prior commitments.; MeloMance (ep. 8) designated as new players, which include the returning Kim Min-seok.)
- Winners: Good singers: 6; Bad singers: 2
- No. of episodes: 8

Release
- Original network: Mnet; tvN
- Original release: March 22 – May 10, 2023

Season chronology
- ← Previous; Season 9

The tenth season of the South Korean television mystery music game show I Can See Your Voice premiered on Mnet and tvN on March 22, 2023.

== Gameplay ==
=== Format ===
For its game phase, the guest artist(s) must attempt to eliminate bad singers after each round. At the end of a game, the last remaining mystery singer is revealed as either good or bad by means of a duet between them and one of the guest artists.

If the last remaining mystery singer is good, they are granted to release a digital single; if a singer is bad, they win ₩5,000,000.

=== Rounds ===
For this season, the "surprise entrant(s)" refer to mystery singer(s) standing inside an enclosure to remain concealed, until its revelation by being eliminated or a final performance by one of the guest artists.

1. Visual round
  The guest artist is given some time to observe and examine five out of six mystery singers, according to year of birth.
2. Lip sync round
  Each mystery singer self-introduces to guest artist and panelists and then performs a song, both on lip sync renditions.
3. Evidence round
  The guest artist is presented with a video package including witnesses reacting to one of the mystery singers when they hear on its own performance that would appear on the show.

== Episodes ==
=== Guest artists ===
Legend:
Good singer
Bad singer

Episode		Guest artist (Note: Players' notes: For the returning guest artists (who also include foreigners and former good singers), names are displayed in italics.; For the mixed groups, names who identified as bad singers are displayed in italics.)	Mystery singers (In their respective numbers and aliases)					
#	Date	Guest artist	Elimination order					Winner
#	Date	Guest artist	Visual round	Lip sync round		Evidence round		Winner
1	March 22, 2023	Shin Hyun-joon (Note: Despite not singing, they were still counted as guest artists.) and Jung Joon-ho	5. Lee Seung-gi (b. 1987)	3. Bang Bo-yong (b. 1990) and Lee Seung-yeon (b. 1992)	6. Shin Hyo-beom (b. 1966)	1. Yoon Bit-byeol (b. 1994)	2. Kim Do-hoon (b. 1989)	4. (Taiwan) Chu Yu-hsien (b. 1995)
2	March 29, 2023	Yoshihiro Akiyama and Mo Tae-bum	2. Kim Chae-won (b. 2004)	3. Kim Ji-woo (b. 2006)	4. Lee Eun-bi (b. 1992)	6. Truedy (b. 1993)	1. Kim Chun-ri (b. 1978)	5. Bak Joo-hyo (b. 1997)
3	April 5, 2023	Lee Seok-hoon (SG Wannabe) and Tei	4. Kim Kwang-hyun (b. 2000)	3. Park Sae-neul (b. 1997)	1. Kang Deok (b. 1993)	2. Kim Min-ah (b. 1995)	5. Lim Yong-hyeok (b. 1988)	6. Kim Kyung-jin (b. 1983)
4	April 12, 2023	Kim Ho-joong	5. Yoo Se-woon (b. 1996)	1. Shin Si-yeon (b. 2000)	3. Daniel Han (b. 1965)	6. Park Seul-gi (b. 1986)	4. Kim Yoon-oh (b. 1992)	2. Kook Doo-hyun (b. 1983)
5	April 19, 2023	Kwon Il-yong and Pyo Chang-won	4. Park Sang-hoon (b. 1999)	3. Yang Seo-yoon (b. 1991)	6. Lee Hyun-yi (b. 1983)	1. Jung Hyun-woo (b. 1999)	2. Jeong Myung-song (b. 1989)	5. Ji Dong-gun (b. 1993)
6	April 26, 2023	Kara	1. Jang Minae (b. 1996) and Lee Da-hyun (b. 2005)	3. (United States) Kamilah Dreux (b. 1999)	6. Jaejae (b. 1990)	4. Jung Yong-hoon (b. 1991)	2. Jung Hyo-cheol (b. 1980)	5. Ahn Hyo-joo (b. 2009)
7	May 3, 2023	Jay Park and The Korean Zombie	3. Cha Si-young (b. 2000)	6. JK Kim Dong-wook (b. 1975)	2. Hwang Ji-yeon and Hwang Ji-won (b. 1994)	4. Dommiu (b. 1999)	1. Park Yeong-joon (b. 2000)	5. (India) Himang Chandola (b. 2001)
8	May 10, 2023	MeloMance	3. Yoon Hye-won (b. 2000) and Yoon Yong-bin (b. 1996)	6. Lee Hyun (b. 1983)	5. Lim Hyun-joon (b. 1992)	2. Jeong Hee-kyung (b. 1997)	4. Im Do-hwan (b. 1994)	1. Lee Dong-moon and Lee Dong-yeop (b. 1992)

=== Panelists ===
Legend:
Regular panelist
Guest panelist

Apps		Panelists in attendance (Sorted by first appearance, with episode designations)
g#	p#	Panelists in attendance (Sorted by first appearance, with episode designations)
8	4	Hwang Chi-yeul, Kim Sang-hyuk (Click-B), Park Myung-soo, and Jonathan Yiombi (Note: Panelists' note: Foreign attendee: Jonathan Yiombi (COD)) (1–8)
2	1	Yoo Jae-hwan (6–7)
1	28	Dreamcatcher (JiU and SuA), IKon (DK and Jay), and Kim Doo-young (1); Billlie (Moon Sua, Sheon, and Tsuki), Kim Bo-reum, and Lee Ahyumi (2); Epex (Baeksung and Keum), WEi (Junseo and Seokhwa), and Yoon Tae-jin (3); H1-Key (Hwiseo and Riina), TAN (Changsun, Jaejun, and Taehoon), and Truedy (4); DKZ (Jonghyeong and Jaechan), Lee Eun-hyeong, and STAYC (Isa and Sieun) (5); Ive (Gaeul and Rei), Song Min-kyung, and Xikers (Hunter and Minjae) (6); Fifty Fifty (Saena and Sio), HolyBang (Jane and Mull), Hong Isaac, and Kim Kyung-rok (V.O.S) (7); BigOne, Kim Kyung-ho, Chaeyeon (Iz*One), Son Dong-pyo (Mirae, Weeekly (Jihan, Soeun, and Soojin), and Yoon Seong-ki (8)

== Reception ==
Legend:
Highest rated episode
Lowest rated episode

No.	Title	Air date	Timeslot (KST)	AGB Ratings		
No.	Title	Air date	Timeslot (KST)	Mnet	tvN	Comb.
1	"Shin Hyun-joon and Jung Joon-ho"	March 22, 2023	Wednesday, 7:00 pm	0.395%	1.632%	2.027%
2	"Choo Sung-hoon and Mo Tae-bum"	March 29, 2023	Wednesday, 7:00 pm	0.222%	1.185%	1.407%
3	"Lee Seok-hoon and Tei"	April 5, 2023	Wednesday, 7:00 pm	0.237%	1.622%	1.859%
4	"Kim Ho-joong"	April 12, 2023	Wednesday, 7:00 pm	0.298%	1.326%	1.624%
5	"Kwon Il-yong and Pyo Chang-won"	April 19, 2023	Wednesday, 7:00 pm	0.271%	1.183%	1.454%
6	"Kara"	April 26, 2023	Wednesday, 7:00 pm	0.437%	1.055%	1.492%
7	"Jay Park and The Korean Zombie"	May 3, 2023	Wednesday, 7:00 pm	0.23%	1.203%	1.433%
8	"MeloMance"	May 10, 2023	Wednesday, 7:00 pm	0.235%	1.23%	1.465%

Source: Nielsen Media Research
