= I Can See Your Voice (South Korean game show) season 6 =

Television game show season

I Can See Your Voice
- Season 6
- Starring: Jang Dong-min; Kim Sang-hyuk (Click-B); Lee Sang-min; DinDin; Joon Park (g.o.d)
- Hosted by: Kim Jong-kook; Leeteuk (Super Junior); Yoo Se-yoon
- Winners: Good singers: 8; Bad singers: 4
- No. of episodes: Regular: 12; Special: 1; Overall: 13

Release
- Original network: Mnet; tvN
- Original release: January 18 – April 12, 2019

Season chronology
- ← Previous; Season 5 Next → Season 7

The sixth season of the South Korean television mystery music game show I Can See Your Voice premiered on Mnet and tvN on January 18, 2019.

== Gameplay ==
=== Format ===
For its game phase, the guest artist(s) must attempt to eliminate bad singers after each round. At the end of a game, the last remaining mystery singer is revealed as either good or bad by means of a duet between them and one of the guest artists.

If the last remaining mystery singer is good, they are granted to release a digital single; if a singer is bad, they win ₩5,000,000.

=== Rounds ===
1. Visual round
  Each mystery singer is given two different identities as a good and bad singer, with one of them is a real identity.
2. Lip sync round
  The mystery singer lip syncs to the good singer's recording, then a bad singer's recording comes in the middle of the performance.
3. Evidence round
  The hosts have randomly assigned clues about the mystery singer, and then the guest artist must choose a clue for each one.

== Episodes ==
=== Guest artists ===
Legend:
Good singer
Bad singer

Episode		Guest artist (Note: Players' notes: For the returning guest artists (who also include foreigners and former good singers), names are displayed in italics.; For the mixed groups, names who identified as bad singers are displayed in italics.)	Mystery singers (In their respective numbers and aliases)					
#	Date	Guest artist	Elimination order					Winner
#	Date	Guest artist	Visual round	Lip sync round		Evidence round		Winner
1	January 18, 2019	Hwang Chi-yeul (Note: Season highlights: Good singers Hwang Chi-yeul and Lee Sun-bin (ep. 1) also returned, playing as guest artists.) and Lee Sun-bin	1. Im Ji-hyun	5. Kim Eun-joo	2. Park Yoon-ho	6. Jo Joon and Jo Min-ho	4. (Thailand) Kongthap Peak	3. Seo Woo-jin
2	January 25, 2019	Starship Family (K.Will, Soyou (Sistar), Donghyun (Boyfriend), Yoo Seung-woo, Jeong Se-woon, Jaehee (Mind U), Kihyun (Monsta X), Yeonjung (Cosmic Girls), and Baek In-tae (Duetto))	2. Kim Tae-kwan	4. Kim Sung-joon	3. Jang Jin-young, Jung Yoo-na, and Kim Na-young	5. Lee Eun-bae	6. Kim Joo-eun	1. Shin Dong-myung
3	February 1, 2019	Simon Dominic, Gray, Loco, and Code Kunst	4. Gong Tan	2. Bae Hae-soo	6. Untouchable and Kim Tae-woo	1. Yoon Dae-woong	3. Jang Eun-hong	5. (United States) Maria Leise
4	February 8, 2019	Koyote	2. Kang Yoo-hyeon	3. Jeon Dong-hyun	1. Kang Joo-won	5. Yoo Dong-hyun	4. Lee Tae-yeon	6. Jo Sung-hyun
5	February 15, 2019	Lena Park and Gummy	3. Lee Seung-joon and Lee Gyu-hyung	1. Park So-young	5. Lee Jin-sung	6. Cha Seon-hyung	2. Yoon Ji-hwan	4. Hwang Ji-hyun
6	February 22, 2019	Seventeen	6. Kim Do-hoon, Kim Dae-hoon, and Go Woo-jin	4. Choi Ji-yeon	2. Im Do-yeon, Hong Joo-hyun, and Lee Dawon	1. Jung Jae-hyun	5. Im Woo-jeong	3. Choi Do-joon
7	March 1, 2019	Brave HongCha (Hong Kyung-min, Cha Tae-hyun, and Samuel)	6. Na Gi-wook	5. Kang Dae-woong, Ji Young-il, and Park Kyung-woo	4. Kim Hyung-seok	2. Kim Min-wook	3. Lee Ye-ji	1. Kim Yoon-gil
8	March 8, 2019	Crush, Rhythm Power, Dynamic Duo, Ha:tfelt, and Kim Seon-jae	6. Im Ji-hyun	1. Baek Na-jeong	2. Kim Han-gyeol	3. Hwang Yoo-jin	5. Kang Bi-oh and Noh Hyun	4. Ha Dong-yeon
9	March 15, 2019	Mamamoo	5. Jung Bo-young, Kim Hyun-kyung, and Myung Ji-hyun	1. Kim Woo-jeong	4. Moon Tae-yeon	2. Kang Han	6. Lee Kang-woo	3. (Kazakhstan) Ninety One
10	March 22, 2019	Noh Sa-yeon and Lee Moo-song	5. Jeong Eun-hye	1. Jeong Dan	6. Heo Joon-seok and Kim Dong-hyun	2. Jeon Ji-yeon and Cheon Jong-hyuk	4. Lee Sung-yong	3. Yook So-hee
11	March 29, 2019	Hwanhee and Lyn	4. Ashley Lee	3. Oh Ji-hoon	5. Jeon Joon-ho	2. Kim Ye-jin	1. Kim Gil-joong	6. Choi Seol-ah
12	April 5, 2019	Bolbbalgan4	1. Kwon Hyung-joon	2. (Ukraine) Nana	4. Park Jae-hyun	5. Jang Il-hyun and Park Soo-min	6. Seo Young-ju	3. Han Jeong-seon
Special	April 12, 2019	Season Highlights						

=== Panelists ===
Legend:
Regular panelist
Additional panelist
Guest panelist

Apps		Panelists in attendance (Sorted by first appearance, with episode designations)
g#	p#	Panelists in attendance (Sorted by first appearance, with episode designations)
12	3	DinDin, Kim Sang-hyuk (Click-B), and Lee Sang-min (1–12)
6	2	Joon Park (g.o.d) (1–6); Jang Dong-min (2, 4, 6–7, 9–10)
5	2	Hong Yoon-hwa (5, 8–11); Park Mi-sun (7–9, 11–12)
4	2	Jang Do-yeon (1–4); Narsha (Brown Eyed Girls) (6–7, 10, 12)
2	2	Don Spike (3, 5); Risabae (3, 11)
1	27	Cheetah, J Black, and Kim Min-kyu (1); Im Chae-eon and Solbin (Laboum) (2); Han Dam-hee (3); Chun Myung-hoon (NRG) and Kim Jin-yeop (4); Camila Han and Cha Geon-jae (5); Gong Seo-young, Jang Gyu-ri (Fromis 9), and Kesung Anderson (Note: Panelists' note: Foreign attendee: Kesung Anderson (USA)) (6); Hong Kyung-in and Kim Tae-kwan (7); Han Hee-jun, Kim Yong-jin (Bohemian), and MC Gree (8); Hwang Bo-mi and SeeA (Pink Fantasy) (9); Bae Ki-sung (Can) and Choi Ji-yeon (10); Taeil (Block B) and Lee Soo-jeong (11); Hangzoo (Rhythm Power), Lee Jeong-seok, and Park Sang-don (12)

== Reception ==
Legend:
Highest rated episode
Lowest rated episode

No.	Title	Air date	Timeslot (KST)	AGB Ratings		
No.	Title	Air date	Timeslot (KST)	Mnet	tvN	Comb.
1	"Hwang Chi-yeul and Lee Sun-bin"	January 18, 2019	Friday, 9:40 pm	0.7%	2.805%	3.505%
2	"Starship Family"	January 25, 2019	Friday, 9:40 pm	0.9%	2.526%	3.426%
3	"Simon Dominic, Gray, Loco, and Code Kunst"	February 1, 2019	Friday, 9:40 pm	0.6%	2.448%	3.008%
4	"Koyote"	February 8, 2019	Friday, 9:40 pm	0.6%	2.927%	3.527%
5	"Lena Park and Gummy"	February 15, 2019	Friday, 9:40 pm	0.8%	2.975%	3.775%
6	"Seventeen"	February 22, 2019	Friday, 9:40 pm	0.6%	2.413%	3.013%
7	"Brave HongCha"	March 1, 2019	Friday, 9:40 pm	1%	3.265%	4.265%
8	"Crush, Rhythm Power, Dynamic Duo, Ha:tfelt, and Kim Seon-jae"	March 8, 2019	Friday, 9:40 pm	0.5%	1.878%	2.378%
9	"Mamamoo"	March 15, 2019	Friday, 9:40 pm	0.6%	2.245%	2.845%
10	"Noh Sa-yeon and Lee Moo-song"	March 22, 2019	Friday, 9:40 pm	0.8%	2.514%	3.314%
11	"Hwanhee and Lyn"	March 29, 2019	Friday, 9:40 pm	0.5%	2.252%	2.752%
12	"Bolbbalgan4"	April 5, 2019	Friday, 9:40 pm	0.6%	2.392%	2.992%
Special	"Season Highlights"	April 12, 2019	Friday, 9:40 pm	0.5%	2.206%	2.706%

Source: Nielsen Media Research
