= I Can See Your Voice (South Korean game show) season 9 =

Television game show season

I Can See Your Voice
- Season 9
- Starring: Eun Ji-won (Sechs Kies); Heo Kyung-hwan; Hanhae; Kim Na-young; Kim Sang-hyuk (Click-B)
- Hosted by: Main: Kim Jong-kook; Leeteuk (Super Junior); Yoo Se-yoon; Guest: Cha Tae-hyun (Note: Season highlights: Cha Tae-hyun became an interim host in 5th episode replacing Kim Jong-kook, as well as YooA (of Oh My Girl) (ep. 10), who they were both tested positive for COVID-19.)
- Winners: Good singers: 6; Bad singers: 6
- No. of episodes: 12

Release
- Original network: Mnet; tvN
- Original release: January 29 – April 16, 2022

Season chronology
- ← Previous; Season 8 Next → Season 10

The ninth season of the South Korean television mystery music game show I Can See Your Voice premiered on Mnet and tvN on January 29, 2022.

At the time of filming during the COVID-19 pandemic, health and safety protocols are also implemented.

== Gameplay ==
=== Format ===
For its game phase, the guest artist(s) must attempt to eliminate bad singers after each round. At the end of a game, the last remaining mystery singer is revealed as either good or bad by means of a duet between them and one of the guest artists.

If the last remaining mystery singer is good, they are granted to release a digital single; if a singer is bad, they win ₩5,000,000.

=== Rounds ===
1. Visual round
  The guest artist is given some time to observe and examine each mystery singer based on their appearance.
2. Lip sync round
  Each mystery singer performs a lip sync on separate phases, with the good singer's recording first, and then the bad singer's last.
3. Interrogation round
  Each mystery singer has to confess what kind of identity they have if the singer is bad.

== Episodes ==
=== Guest artists ===
Legend:
Good singer
Bad singer

Episode		Guest artist (Note: Players' notes: For the returning guest artists (who also include foreigners and former good singers), names are displayed in italics.; For the mixed groups, names who identified as bad singers are displayed in italics.)	Mystery singers (In their respective numbers and aliases)					
#	Date	Guest artist	Elimination order					Winner
#	Date	Guest artist	Visual round	Lip sync round		Interrogation round		Winner
1	January 29, 2022	Eun Ji-won (Sechs Kies), Kim Jong-min, Tiger JK, and Jang Su-won	5. Lee Wook-jin	1. Lee Seon-ok	4. Na Young-in	3. Kim Yang-gyu	6. Go Hyun-wook	2. Kim Yeon-jung
2	February 5, 2022	Pak Se-ri (Note: Despite not singing, they were still counted as guest artists.) and Park Tae-hwan	3. Kim Sang-eun and Kim Sang-ji	5. Kim Min-sung	2. Park Ki-young, Nam Hyun-hee, Kim Su-hyeon, and Kim Seon-ho	6. Kim Baek-geun	1. Choi Bo-bae	4. Lee Hyung-hoon and Park Jeong-hyun
3	February 12, 2022	Jessi and Monika Shin	6. (United States) Samuel Tolly	1. Lee Chae-mi	3. Kim Jong-wook	4. Kim Gyu-ri	2. Oh Hyun	5. Kim Do-yi
4	February 19, 2022	M.O.M. (Jee Seok-jin, KCM, and Wonstein)	1. Kim Tae-beom	2. Jin Ju-hyung	3. Ahn Hye-soo	4. Shim Sang-hee	5. Yoo Hye-ji	6. Oh Tae-gyu and Jung Chan-woo
5	February 26, 2022	Davichi	1. Hwang Jin-seon	2. (United Kingdom) Ianu and (United States) Trudy	6. Hong Ji-hye, Kwon Ye-rin, and Yoo Ye-jin	3. Park Han-gyeol	4. Jung Jin-hyuk	5. Kim Do-hwan
6	March 5, 2022	The Blue	1. Woo Hyun-min	4. Ha Eun-taek and Heo Jun	2. Kim Kyung-min, Noh Dong-rim, and Park Shin-hee	3. Kim Tae-hyun and Kim Da-hye	5. Kim Geon-woo	6. Lee Hyun-song
7	March 12, 2022	Johan Kim (Solid), Kim Jae-hwan, and Lee Seok-hoon (SG Wannabe)	1. Yoon Myung-hee, Kim Yong-joo, and Song Sang-woon	2. Kim Chang-yeon	6. Lee Chil-sung, Kim Jeong-ah, Lee Seung-hyun, and Lee Seung-min	3. Park Ji-eon and Park Ji-sung	5. (United States) Eddie Brown	4. Rebecca Kim
8	March 19, 2022	Lee Yoon-ji and Park Hyun-bin	2. Kang Han-byeol	1. Namgung Hyun	3. Nam Hyung-geun and Han Si-eon	5. Cha Min-jeong	4. Lee Gyu-jae	6. Kwon Kyung-hwan
9	March 26, 2022	Im Chang-jung and Yoon Min-soo (Vibe)	1. Ahreum "Ash" Hanyou	2. Seyoung	5. Hong Seung-gi and Shin Kang-min	3. Kim Geun-woo and Jo Sung-hee	6. Bae Chang-bok	4. Oh Byung-joo
10	April 2, 2022	Oh My Girl	3. Oh Ye-rin and Im Sang-woo	1. (Philippines) Sara Elio	5. Jeon So-young	4. Lee Sang-hoon	2. Park Hwan-hee	6. Kim Byung-seok
11	April 9, 2022	Mamadoll (Kahi and Park Jung-ah)	2. Lee Hyun-seok and Sean Lee	3. Kim Dong-gyun	5. Jung Hye-young and Ahn Do-kyung	6. Lee Hyun	4. Kim Hyun-gyu	1. Kim Hwi-eun and Na Young-joo
12	April 16, 2022	Sung Si-kyung	6. Hwang Gyu-chang	2. Yoon Jae-eun	5. Kim Yoo-ni	3. Lee Dong-eun	4. Yeo Eui-joo	1. Kim Ye-sung

=== Panelists ===
Legend:
Regular panelist
Guest panelist

Apps		Panelists in attendance (Sorted by first appearance, with episode designations)
g#	p#	Panelists in attendance (Sorted by first appearance, with episode designations)
12	3	Heo Kyung-hwan, Hanhae, and Kim Sang-hyuk (Click-B) (1–12)
11	1	Eun Ji-won (Sechs Kies) (2–12)
10	2	Kim Na-young (1–10)
2	2	Lee Hyun-yi (1–2); Ha Sung-woon (2, 11)
1	29	Yena (Iz*One) and Kim Seung-hyun (1); Hong Seok-cheon (2); Chaeyeon (Iz*One), Daehwi (AB6IX), and Lip J (3); Enhypen (Jay and Jungwon), Kim Soo-yong, and Lee Ahyumi (4); Lee Eun-ji, Taeil (Block B), and Yoon Ji-sung (5); Cho Jun-ho, Stephanie Kim, and Stray Kids (Lee Know and Seungmin) (6); Donghyuk (iKON), Hwang Soo-kyung, and Treasure (Yedam and Hyunsuk) (7); Yuri (Iz*One), Na Tae-joo, and Park Seul-gi (8); Ben, Park Goon, and Pentagon (Hongseok and Wooseok) (9); Lee Eun-hyung, Choa, and Abhishek Gupta (Note: Panelists' note: Foreign attendees: Abhishek Gupta (IND) and Sam Hammington (NZL)) (10); Bae Yoon-jeong and Narsha (Brown Eyed Girls) (11); Sam Hammington, Eunbi (Iz*One), and Na Yoon-kwon (12)

== Reception ==
Legend:
Highest rated episode
Lowest rated episode

No.	Title	Air date	Timeslot (KST)	AGB Ratings		
No.	Title	Air date	Timeslot (KST)	Mnet	tvN	Comb.
1	"Eun Ji-won, Kim Jong-min, Tiger JK, and Jang Su-won"	January 29, 2022	Saturday, 10:40 pm	0.405%	1.55%	1.955%
2	"Pak Se-ri and Park Tae-hwan"	February 5, 2022	Saturday, 10:40 pm	0.725%	2.955%	3.68%
3	"Jessie and Monika Shin"	February 12, 2022	Saturday, 10:40 pm	0.412%	2.294%	2.706%
4	"M.O.M."	February 19, 2022	Saturday, 10:40 pm	0.582%	2.186%	2.768%
5	"Davichi"	February 26, 2022	Saturday, 10:40 pm	0.415%	1.81%	2.225%
6	"The Blue"	March 5, 2022	Saturday, 10:40 pm	0.304%	1.96%	2.264%
7	"Johan Kim, Kim Jae-hwan, and Lee Seok-hoon"	March 12, 2022	Saturday, 10:40 pm	0.323%	1.59%	1.913%
8	"Lee Yoon-ji and Park Hyun-bin"	March 19, 2022	Saturday, 10:40 pm	0.49%	2.03%	2.52%
9	"Im Chang-jung and Yoon Min-soo"	March 26, 2022	Saturday, 10:40 pm	0.35%	2.118%	2.468%
10	"Oh My Girl"	April 2, 2022	Saturday, 11:00 pm	0.395%	1.796%	2.191%
11	"Mamadoll"	April 9, 2022	Saturday, 10:40 pm	0.348%	1.744%	2.092%
12	"Sung Si-kyung"	April 16, 2022	Saturday, 10:40 pm	0.339%	1.982%	2.321%

Source: Nielsen Media Research
