= I Can See Your Voice (South Korean game show) season 3 =

Television game show season

I Can See Your Voice
- Season 3
- Starring: Han Hee-jun; Jang Do-yeon; Kim Sang-hyuk (Click-B); Lee Sang-min
- Hosted by: Kim Bum-soo; Leeteuk (Super Junior); Yoo Se-yoon
- Winners: Good singers: 7; Bad singers: 5
- No. of episodes: 12

Release
- Original network: Mnet; tvN
- Original release: June 30 – September 15, 2016

Season chronology
- ← Previous; Season 2 Next → Season 4

The third season of the South Korean television mystery music game show I Can See Your Voice premiered on Mnet and tvN on June 30, 2016.

== Gameplay ==
=== Format ===
For its game phase, the guest artist(s) must attempt to eliminate bad singers after each round. At the end of a game, the last remaining mystery singer is revealed as either good or bad by means of a duet between them and one of the guest artists.

If the last remaining mystery singer is good, they are granted to release a digital single; if a singer is bad, they win ₩5,000,000.

=== Rounds ===
1. Visual round
  The guest artist is given some time to observe and examine each mystery singer based on their appearance.
2. Lip sync round
  Each mystery singer performs a lip sync to a song; good singers mime to a recording of their own, while bad singers mime to a backing track by another vocalist.
3. Evidence round
  A proof of each mystery singer's singing ability (i.e. photo, video, certificates, etc.) is shown on the screen. Good singers have own evidences, while bad singers have their evidences fabricated.

== Episodes ==
=== Guest artists ===
Legend:
Good singer
Bad singer

Episode		Guest artist (Note: Players' notes: For the returning guest artists (who also include foreigners and former good singers), names are displayed in italics.; For the mixed groups, names who identified as bad singers are displayed in italics.)	Mystery singers (In their respective numbers and aliases)						
#	Date	Guest artist	Elimination order						Winner
#	Date	Guest artist	Visual round		Lip sync round		Evidence round		Winner
1	June 30, 2016	Park Jin-young	4. Heo Joo-hee	5. Kang Joo-won	1. Bae Ji-mi	7. Mio	6. Kim Joon-hwi	3. James	2. Kwon Hyuk-joon
2	July 7, 2016	Choi Min-soo	3. Kim Chook-bok	6. Park Hyang-rok	1. Lee Joo-hee	4. Park Ji-nam	5. Jeong So-ri	7. Jang Sang-young	2. Kim Jin-yeop
3	July 14, 2016	Wonder Girls	1. (Vietnam) LiME	7. Uangel Voice	5. (Israel) Hila Halevi	3. K Jun	4. Kim Min-jeong	2. Hwang Tae-ik	6. Jang Seung-cheol
4	July 21, 2016	Kim Yoon-ah	1. Park Geon-woo	5. Jo Hyun-jin	4. Han Eun-bi	2. Lee Jeong-eun	7. Lee Jae-won	3. Jo Joon-hee	6. Lee Gyeol
5	July 28, 2016	Jung Joon-young	2. Woo Je-sung	3. Yun Jeong-hoon	5. Bang Seok-won	7. Lee Kyung-hwan	1. Lim Jeong-wook	6. Lee Sun-bin	4. Choi Seol-hwa
6	August 4, 2016	Jessi	1. Yoon Yong-bin	6. Ahn Jun-min	5. Kim Joon-soo	4. Yang Young-woong	3. Ahn Ji-young	7. Lee Chang-hyun	2. Park Joon-seok
7	August 11, 2016	Yoon Sang	6. Seo Bo-sung	4. Kim Young-sool and Lee Sam-nam	3. Min Yo-han	1. Kim Se-eun	7. Jeon Yong-woon	5. Hong Dong-woo	2. Lee In-woo
8	August 18, 2016	John Park	7. Jang Hyung-min	1. Kim Young-jong	6. Lee Min and Im Dae-heon	5. Kim Joo-hyun	4. Moon Ha-neul	2. Shin Da-won	3. (United States) Joseph Butso
9	August 25, 2016	2PM	5. Sherry	2. Park Young-woo	1. Park Won-ho and Han Jin-woo	3. Lee Ji-ae	7. Jung Do-young	6. Im Jin-gang and Lee Gi-chang	4. Yoo Jeong-woo
10	September 1, 2016	g.o.d	3. Soulstar	2. Hong Bon-young	4. Choo Joon-ho	1. Jang Young	7. Seon Woo-sung, Seo Jae-won, Kim Geon-joong, Kim Tae-yang, and Kim Tae-geun	6. Lee Do-hee	5. Goo Jeong-hyun
11	September 8, 2016	I.O.I	6. Yang Joong-eun	2. Shin Sung-hyuk and Kim Jin-hwan	1. Jung Shi-hyuk	3. Lee Jeong-seok	5. Jung Teok, Oh Da-gil, and Lee He-ra	4. Yang In-joon	7. Maytree
12	September 15, 2016	Davichi	4. Lee Seok-woo	5. Shin Ye-ji	2. Queen B'Z, Yeo Na-im, and Kim Jeong-yeon	6. Hong Sung-won	1. Koonta	3. CODE-V	7. Gugak Girl Group

=== Panelists ===
Legend:
Regular panelist
Guest panelist

Apps		Panelists in attendance (Sorted by first appearance, with episode designations)
g#	p#	Panelists in attendance (Sorted by first appearance, with episode designations)
12	4	Han Hee-jun, Jang Do-yeon, Kim Sang-hyuk (Click-B), and Lee Sang-min (1–12)
5	1	DinDin (2, 5, 8, 10, 12)
4	1	Ben (9–12)
3	4	Stephanie Kim (2, 4–5); Kim Heung-gook (3, 6, 9); Jung In-young (5–6, 12); Kim So-hee (Note: Panelists' note: Kim So-hee also attended in ep. 11, this time as part of C.I.V.A., alongside Lee Soo-min and Yoon Chae-kyung.) (8–11)
2	6	Bae Yoon-jeong (1, 6); Kim Hyo-jin (4, 5); Don Spike (7–8); Kim Ji-min (7, 10); Park Ji-yoon (9–10); Joon Park (g.o.d) (11–12)
1	27	Jinyoung (Got7) and Yeeun (Wonder Girls) (1); 36.5°C Band (Park Byeon-gye, Park Eui-jeong, and Park Seung-soo) and Homme (Lee Chang-min and Lee Hyun) (2); James, Kim Il-joong, Lee Ji-hye, and Park Joon-soo (3); Hanhae (Phantom) and Kim Jin-yeop (4); Block B (Taeil and Park Kyung) and Juniel (5); Choi Hee, Kim Ji-ah, and Shin Bo-ra (6); Park Gyu-ri and Space Cowboy (7); Kang Yoo-mi (8); MC Dingdong, Sleepy (Untouchable), and Yein (Melody Day) (9); Joosuc and KIXS (DMTN) (10); Jun. K (2PM) and C.I.V.A. (Lee Soo-min, Kim So-hee, and Yoon Chae-kyung) (11); Kangnam (M.I.B) (12)

== Reception ==
Legend:
Highest rated episode
Lowest rated episode

No.	Title	Air date	Timeslot (KST)	AGB Ratings			TNmS Ratings		
No.	Title	Air date	Timeslot (KST)	Mnet	tvN	Comb.	Mnet	tvN	Comb.
1	"Park Jin-young"	June 30, 2016	Thursday, 9:40 pm	0.7%	2.635%	3.335%	0.8%	1.7%	2.5%
2	"Choi Min-soo"	July 7, 2016	Thursday, 9:40 pm	0.6%	2.069%	2.669%	0.8%	1.7%	2.5%
3	"Wonder Girls"	July 14, 2016	Thursday, 9:40 pm	0.5%	1.849%	2.349%	0.7%	1.4%	2.1%
4	"Kim Yoon-ah"	July 21, 2016	Thursday, 9:40 pm	0.9%	2.334%	3.234%	0.6%	2%	2.6%
5	"Jung Joon-young"	July 28, 2016	Thursday, 9:40 pm	0.5%	2.392%	2.892%	0.8%	1.6%	2.4%
6	"Jessi"	August 4, 2016	Thursday, 9:40 pm	0.7%	1.939%	2.639%	0.8%	2%	2.8%
7	"Yoon Sang"	August 11, 2016	Thursday, 9:40 pm	1%	1.903%	2.903%	0.8%	1.7%	2.5%
8	"John Park"	August 18, 2016	Thursday, 9:40 pm	0.6%	1.737%	2.337%	0.8%	1.6%	2.4%
9	"2PM"	August 25, 2016	Thursday, 9:40 pm	0.4%	2%	2.4%	1%	1.9%	2.9%
10	"g.o.d"	September 1, 2016	Thursday, 9:40 pm	0.7%	1.943%	2.643%	1.1%	1.3%	2.4%
11	"IOI"	September 8, 2016	Thursday, 9:40 pm	0.5%	1.845%	2.345%	0.7%	1%	1.7%
12	"Davichi"	September 15, 2016	Thursday, 9:40 pm	0.6%	2.217%	2.817%	0.7%	1.2%	1.9%

Sources: Nielsen Media Research and TNmS
