= Nerd Connection =

South Korean rock band

- Origin: South Korea
- Genres: Alternative Rock, Korean Rock
- Instruments: Drum, Guitar, Bass and Vocals
- Years active: 2017–present
- Label: Your Summer
- Members: Shin Yeon-tae; Choi Seong-won; Seo Young-joo; Park Jae-hyun

Nerd Connection (Korean: 너드커넥션) is a four-member South Korean rock band. Nerd Connection formed on 31 May 2017, later officially debuting on 12 August 2018 with their single "Hymn of the Birds". The band's slogan is "(in a) dizzy world, warm music" (Korean: "어지러운 세상, 따뜻한 음악"). Nerd connection's music is heavily inspired by western bands from the 1990s and early 2000s such as Radiohead, Coldplay, Red Hot Chili Peppers, Muse, and Oasis as well as Korean artists such as Kim Kwang-seok, San-ul-rim, The Black Skirts, and Nell.

== Formation ==
Nerd Connection's Seo Young-joo and Choi Seung-wo met at Yonsei University's college band club 'Medusa' in 2012 after they were assigned to the same team. In 2013, Park Jae-hyun joined 'Medusa' as a new member and subsequently teamed up with Young-joo and Seung-wo. In 2017 the three members decided to take up their band activities professionally (previously they had been playing together as a hobby) and recruited Shin Yeon-tae (who had previously worked together with Jae-hyun on a project band) as their drummer.

== Musicality ==
Nerd Connection writes their song lyrics in both Korean and English. According to the band's vocalist Seo Young-joo, the band writes both a Korean and an English version of their song, afterwards choosing "the language which resonates more". When writing in Korean, their lyrics are reported to be "emotional and beautiful metaphors".

== Career ==
=== 2018–2021: career beginnings ===
In 2018 Nerd Connection competed at the Emergenza World Band Competition 2018 Korea. The band competed in five preliminary rounds held in Korea, before winning the Korean branch of the competition's final round. The final of the Emergenza world competition was held in Germany. The winning bands from each country performed at the Taubertal Festival 2018 in Germany.

On 5 April 2019, band members Jae-hyun and Young-joo featured in episode 12 of season 6 of I Can See Your Voice. While both members joined as representatives of Nerd Connection, they performed individually. Jae-hyun performed first in the Lip Sync round as a "good" singer. Later in the episode Young-joo performed as a "good singer" in the Evidence round.

Nerd Connection's first EP was released on 6 December 2019. Their EP, Too Fast, runs for 22 minutes and features five songs.

On 22 October 2020, Nerd Connection's fourth single "Back in Time" was released.

On 21 January 2021 the band released their fifth single titled "Time Falling".

Nerd Connection's sixth single, "걸어갈래요" (English translation: "I'll Walk") was released on 24 March 2021. The song "attracts the sympathy of many people with its lyrical lyrics that contain a voice of support".

On 6 June 2021, Nerd Connection released their next single titled "Nan". Following this release, on 15 June 2021, Young-joo and Seung-yoon featured in episode 11 of JTBC's Sing Again spin-off show, Famous Singers.

On 17 June 2021, Nerd Connection signed with the Korean record label/agency Your Summer.

"Life Dancing", Nerd Connection's eighth single came out on 15 August 2021. This song compares the motions of everyday living to a dance. Through their lyrics, Nerd Connection suggests that "Our struggles are quite sad when you look closely, but beautiful from a distance".

=== 2022–present: budding popularity ===
Nerd Connection's released their first song to feature on an OST (Soundtrack) on 15 January 2022. The song, titled "Lullaby", featured on the Korean TV show, Through the Darkeness's soundtrack titled Through The Darkness OST Part.1. The song features "a repetitive and heavy acoustic guitar with a folk rhythm" that "leaves a hazy yet clear impression". The band released their next OST single soon after titled, 'Fly Away'. The song (which was released on 19 March 2022) featured on the album I Have Not Done My Best (Original Television Soundtrack) Pt.5, which was released for the Korean show, I Have Not Done My Best. The song expresses the appearance of a character who "bravely breaks from reality to move toward their dreams".

On 16 April 2022, Nerd Connection auditioned for the show Great Seoul Invasion and performed during a live streaming of the auditions. While the band passed the audition round and were meant to advance to the finals (the broadcast television program) they withdrew on 9 May 2022. They stated that their withdrawal was due to issues they had with the contents of their contract with MNET.

Nerd Connection released their ninth single "Beodeul-gil" on 8 June 2022. The song's keyword "road" reflects the theme Nerd Connection strove to convey of "not forgetting the events, memories, wishes and values contained within".

On 18 June 2022, Nerd Connection started their first tour titled, Supernova! with their first stop being at KT&G Sangsang Live Hall in Busan. On 20 and 21 August, Nerd Connection continued their tour in Seoul, performing at Hyundai Card.

On 6 September 2022, Nerd Connection released their tenth single "Pablo".

Nerd Connection continued their Supernova! Tour from 17 to 18 September 2022, hosting a concert at Sejong Music Creation Centre in Sejong.

On 22 September 2022, Nerd Connection performed at the Germany Reeperbahn Festival 2022 as part of the joint 'Korea Spotlight' performance. The Korea Creative Content Agency held the event at the festival after recruiting various Korean musical acts. The agency held two rounds to select which acts would perform at the festival. The first round had 48 teams apply, with 10 passing to the next round. During the second round a final 4 teams (Nerd Connection, Dajung, CHE and 250) were selected. These teams performed as part of the 'Korea Spotlight' stage.

Nerd Connection released their third single to feature on an official soundtrack on 22 October 2022. Their song "I'm Lost" appeared on the album Blind (Original Television Soundtrack), Pt.4, which was released for the Korean TV show Blind. This single was produced as a collaboration between singer-songwriter Ra.L and composer Jang Hyun-ho.

On 29 December 2022, Nerd Connection released their eleventh single named "That's Also Our Love". Following this release, Nerd Connection held the final concert of their first tour, Supernova! Final from 30 to 31 December 2022 in Seoul. At the beginning of 2023, on 18 February 2023, the band held a sequel concert to their national tour titled, Supernova! Encore. This concert was held at Rolling Hall in Seoul.

"I Robbed a Bank", the band's twelfth single came out on 31 May 2023. The single features "wild electric guitar and drum" accompanied by a "dull yet sharp vocal" to convey a message of "the way to deal with chaos is to counter it with a strong will".

On 1 and 2 July 2023, Nerd Connection held concerts at the first stop of their second tour Well! Are You Good?, at Mushinsa Garreji in Seoul. Their second stop for this tour was in Gangneung, where they hosted a concert at the 'Gangneung Cultural Foundation Performance Hall' on 8 July 2023. The last stop of this tour was held on 22 and 23 July 2023, at KT&G Sangsang Live Hall in Busan.

Nerd Connection released the single, "If I Have You Only" (My Love X Nerd Connection) on 15 August 2023. The song was released as a collaborative piece for the Taiwanese move remake My Love of the Korean film On Your Wedding Day.

Soon after, Nerd Connection's second EP, Hard To Explain, was released on 13 September 2023. It features five songs, with a duration of 16 minutes. In this album, "the bass sound (with heavy resonance) incites a rhythmic beat, leading the story of the entire album".

"Losing Myself", Nerd Connection's fourteenth single, was released on 23 June 2024.

On 28 July 2024, Nerd Connection featured in the lineup (among Scottish rock band Travis, American singer-songwriter Alec Benjamin, English singer-songwriter King Krule, Korean girl-group Kiss of Life, Korean singer-songwriter Ha Hyun-sang, and various other artists) for the summer music festival, Have a Nice Trip 2024. The festival took place at Kintex (in Goyang, Gyeonggi Province) and was run by The Vault. Nerd Connection performed on the festival's second day with a 50-minute set.

Nerd Connection's second full-length album was released on 12 August 2024. It is titled, And Yet, We Still, and features 14 songs (with a total duration of 57 minutes). The band's bassist explained that Nerd Connection's aim with this album was to create a maximum amount of sound however rather than using synthesiser as the band had in the past "filled the sound with only strings and percussion instruments". The cover art for this album was created by the artist Go Yoo-Sun (Korean: 고요손) and, "conveys a minimalist yet intense image".

On 8 August 2024, Nerd Connection performed a dual concert with the Taiwanese rock band the Chairs, sponsored by Wishing Well (Taiwanese Mandarin: 微醺樂) and titled Lost & Escape.

From 27 to 29 September 2023, Nerd Connection performed their first concerts as part of their national section of their tour And Yet, We Still. The first set of performances were performed in Seoul at Blue Square.

On 4 October 2024, Nerd Connection made an appearance on the Korean talk show Lee Young-ji's Rainbow, which is broadcast by KBS. The band performed their songs "Good Night Good Dream", "Silently Completely Eternally" and "If I Have You Only" (My love X Nerd Connection).

On 6 October 2024, Nerd Connection performed at the 29th Busan International Film Festival Asian Content Awards & Global OTT Awards.

The second stop of Nerd Connection's national leg of the And Yet, We Still tour was held on 19 October 2024 at Daegu's Exco. The third stop was in Busan where they performed at Busan KBS Hall on 26 October. Following this, Nerd Connection performed at '우송예술회관' in Daejeon on 2 November 2024. The last stop of Nerd Connection's national leg of their And Yet, We Still tour was held on 9 November 2024, at Chonbuk National University Samsung Cultural Center in Jeonju. Following this last stop in Korea, Nerd Connection held their first solo concert outside of Korea in Tokyo, Japan. They performed at Garrett Udagawa on 15 November 2024. After this performance, Nerd Connection traveled to Taipei, Taiwan for their last stop of the And Yet, We Still tour. They performed at Corner Max on 22 and 23 November 2024.

== Members ==
- Shin Yeon-tae (신연태) – drummer (2017–present)
- Choi Seong-won (최승원) – leader and guitarist (2012–present)
- Seo Young-joo (서영주) – vocalist and guitarist (2012–present)
- Park Jae-hyun (박재현) – bassist (2013–present)

== Discography ==
=== Albums ===
Title	Details	Peak chart positions	Sales
Title	Details	KOR	Sales
New Century Masterpiece Cinema	Duration: 42 minutes; Released: 27 October 2021; Label/Copyright: 유어썸머 (under license to Genie Music Corporation); Formats: Digital download; Track listing: 1. "21st Century Kingdom"; 2. "Hollywood Movie Star"; 3. "29"; 4. "Behind the Trees"; 5. "Supernova!"; 6. "Star Communications"; 7. "Will We Be a Melody"; 8. "Snowman in a Bathtub"; 9. "Green Fields"; 10. "Odds"; 11. "Life Dancing"; 12. "Silently Completely Eternally"	—	—
And Yet, We Still	Duration: 57 minutes; Released: 12 August 2024; Label/Copyright: Your Summer (under license to Kakao Entertainment); Formats: LP, Digital download, streaming; Track listing: 1. "Playing Shadow"; 2. "Psychiatric Hospital"; 3. "Headshrinker"; 4. "Cash"; 5. "Losing Myself"; 6. "Forever Only"; 7. "You"; 8. "Hold on Tight"; 9. "She"; 10. "Freddy"; 11. "Clown"; 12. "The Highest Tie"; 13. "Good Luck"; 14. "Just 4 Shots" (bonus track)	56	KOR: 2,496

=== EPs ===
Title	EP details
Too Fast	Duration: 22 minutes; Released: 6 December 2019; Label/Copyright: Nerd Connection; Formats: Digital download; Track listing: 1. "Waterfall"; 2. "V"; 3. "Interlude"; 4. "Castel"; 5. "Where Are We"
Hard to Explain	Duration: 16 minutes; Released: 13 September 2023; Label/Copyright: Your Summer (under license to Kakao Entertainment); Formats: Digital download; Track listing: 1. "Planet Earth"; 2. "Stand Up"; 3. "Hi, Drunk!"; 4. "I Robbed a Band" (remastered ver.); 5. "Been This Way"

=== Singles ===
Title	Year	Peak chart positions	Album
Title	Year	KOR	Album
"Hymn of the Birds"	2018	—	Non-album singles
"Bamboo Forest" (대나무숲)	2019	—	Non-album singles
"Waterfall"	2019	—	Too Fast
"Castel"	2019	—	Too Fast
"Good Night Good Dream" (좋은 밤 좋은 꿈)	2020	98	Non-album singles
"Back in Time"	2020	—	Non-album singles
"Time Falling" (진눈깨비)	2021	—	Non-album singles
"I'll Walk" (걸어갈래요)	2021	—	Non-album singles
"Nan" (두려울뿐야)	2021	—	Non-album singles
"Life Dancing"	2021	—	New Century Masterpiece Cinema
"Will We Be a Melody" (우린 노래가 될까)	2021	—	New Century Masterpiece Cinema
"Beodeul-gil" (버들길)	2022	—	Non-album singles
"Pablo"	2022	—	Non-album singles
"That's also our love" (그 또한 우리 사랑)	2022	—	Non-album singles
"I Robbed a Bank"	2023	—	Hard to Explain
"If I Have You Only" (그대만 있다면) (My Love X Nerd Connection)	2023	7	Non-album single
"Stand Up"	2023	—	Hard to Explain
"Been This Way" (여전히 이곳에)	2023	—	Hard to Explain
"Losing Myself"	2024	—	And Yet, We Still
"You" (사랑을 닮은 이유로)	2024	—	And Yet, We Still
"Freddy"	2024	—	And Yet, We Still
"The Highest Tie" (가장 높은 인연)	2024	—	And Yet, We Still
"—" denotes release did not chart.

=== Soundtracks (OSTs) ===
Song title, year of release, album of release, and artist
Title	Year	Album	Ref.
"Lullaby"	2022	Through the Darkness OST Part.1	
"Fly Away"	2022	I Have Not Done My Best (Original Television Soundtrack) Pt.5	
"I'm Lost"	2022	Blind (Original Television Soundtrack), Pt.4	
"Smile for me"	2025	Motel California OST Part 5	
"Woojooin" (Seo young-joo)	2025	Melo Movie OST	

== Radio appearances ==
- EBS Night Radio, 2 October 2024

== Filmography ==
=== Music-related broadcasts ===
Release date	Title	Participating members	Media/publicising site	Ref.
2 July 2020	Naver On Stage 2.0	All	Naver	
10 February 2021	Baemin Live (Episode 22)	All		
15 February 2021	Naver NOW Jukjae's night studio (Episode 229)	Young-joo and Seung-yoon	Naver	
15 February 2021	Discovery Channel Korea Sing Together (Episode 5)	Young-joo and Seung-yoon	Discovery Channel Korea	
25 August 2021	Ulsan MBC Culture Eum Concert	All	Usmbc Music	
11 September 2021	MBC Show! Music Core	All	MBC	
3 November 2021	Arirang TV I'm Live	All	Arirang TV	
5 November 2021	UBC Open Art Stage Duran	All	UBC	
17 November 2021	Naver NOW Jukjae's night studio (episode 427)	All	Naver	
7 January 2022, 11 March 2022	KBS2 Yoo Hee-yeol's Sketchbook (Episode 572 and 581)	All	Naver	
8 April 2022	EBS Space Empathy <peace for UKRAINE I - No gunshots on music paper> (Episode 1571)	All	EBS	
16 April 2022	Naver NOW response c yes (Episode 425)	All	Naver	
30 November 2022	Deokwon Yoon Peppers's Indie	All		
23 December 2022	Empathize with EBS Space (Episode 1606)	All	EBS	
11 June 2023 and 28 April 2024	KBS Open Concert (Episode 1434 and 1476)	All	KBS	
14 August 2024	대한민국에서 가장 핫한 밴드의 미공개 앨범을 최초로 들어보았습니다	All	LookSam	
3 October 2024	도대회 1등이 너희였구나 (ft.너드커넥션)	All	카더정원	
4 October 2024	KBS Lee Young-ji's Rainbow (Episode 2)	All	KBS	
6 October 2024	2024 Busan International Film Festival Asian Content Awards & Global OTT Awards	All	Busan International Film Festival	

=== Variety/entertainment shows ===
Release date	Title	Participating members	Media/publicising site	Ref.
5 April 2019	I Can See Your Voice season 6 (Episode 12)	Jae-hyun and Young-joo	Mnet	
5 April 2019	Famous Singers (Episode 8 and 11)	Jae-hyun and Young-joo	JTBC	
16 April 2022	Great Seoul Invasion	All	MNET	

== Concerts ==
=== Solo ===
- Connection course vol.1 (streamed online), 6 April 2020
- Nerd Connection's first solo performance <INTERLUDE>, 12 April 2020
- Connection course vol.2 (streamed online), 30 May 2020
- Shining Lab Seasonal Lansun Festival Season 1 - I miss you, how are you? (streamed online), 3 October 2020
- 2021 Transfiguration, 4 October 2021
- 1st regular album <NEW CENTURY MASTERPIECE CINEMA> Release commemorative showcase, 14 November 2021
- 2021 Nerd Connection Year-end Concert <New Century Masterpiece Theater>, 31 December 2021 ~ 2 January 2022
- SUPERNOVA! Seoul, 20–21 August 2022
- SUPERNOVA! Sejong, 17–18 September 2022
- Guitar in the museum, 24 September 2022
- Rolling's 28th Anniversary Concert: Nerd Connection Solo Concert, 20 May 2023
- WELL! ARE YOU GOOD? Seoul, 1–2 July 2023
- WELL! ARE YOU GOOD? Gangneung, 8 July 2023
- WELL! ARE YOU GOOD? Busan, 22–23 July 2023
- Nerd Connection xZ1 <TERRARIUM>_Sync Next 23, 12- 13 August 2023
- Things that are difficult to explain - Seoul, 6–8 October 2023
- Things that are difficult to explain - Daejeon, 4 November 2023
- GAC Special Performance Focus: Nerd Connection 'Spring Sound', 19 April 2024
- Indie God Festival, 20 July 2024
- Interview show commemorating the release of the second regular album 'Still, we', 22 August 2024
- And yet, We still - Seoul, 27–29 September 2024
- And yet, We still - TOKYO, 15 November 2024
- And yet, We still - TAIPEI, 22-23 November 2024
- THE NERD CONNECTION 2024, 20-21 December 2024

=== Joint performances ===
- 2019 Sinchon Night Event Underground Performance, 18 May 2019
- Indie band Korea-Japan exhibition opening performance, 1 June 2019
- 2021 MUSE ON DAY #1 (streamed online), 31 July 2021
- Ulsan MBC Culture Ium Concert, 25 August 2021
- Appeared in Gwangju MBC Nanjang, 7 October 2021
- Gwanghwa Pungryu 5G real-time busking performance, 17 December 2021
- Live club day, 22 July 2022
- 2022 KAMF, 16 September 2022
- Live SUM LUNA (cancelled), 4 November 2022
- Live SUM 2023 vol2 "Moonlight Island", 24 March 2023
- 2023 Sunrise Festival, 12 May 2023
- Lossless ensemble Night : Kim Metseidol & Nerd Connection, 16 June 2023
- Seocho Music and Art Festival, 17 June 2023
- 2023 Catholic University Damatje, 14 September 2023
- 2023 Muse On Live Week, 17 September 2023
- 2023 Gongju University Daedong Festival, 20 September 2023
- 2023 Chungnam National University Yeonnong Festival, 12 October 2023
- Dongdaemun Ten Festa, 21 October 2023
- 2023 Hoseo University Daedong Festival, 26 October 2023
- Bulmok Night Market, 17 November 2023
- Talk concert with stories and music, 16 December 2023
- Spring Indie, come see us!, 8 March 2024
- Somehow Festival: Nerd Connection x D82, 31 March 2024
- 2024 Soongsil University Spring Festival, 16 May 2024
- 2024 Gyeonggi University Spring Festival, 22 May 2024
- 2024 Hallym University Daedong Festival, 23 May 2024
- 2024 Suwon University Daedong Festival, 30 May 2024
- Concert as I like, 23 June 2024
- The 5th Gyeongju Youth Day Commemoration Ceremony, 17 August 2024
- Yeongdo Indie Concert, 6 December 2024

=== Domestic festivals (South Korea) ===
- 2021 Grand Mint Festival (cancelled), 24 October 2021
- Festival SUM 2022, 5 June 2022
- 2024 Soundberry Festival, 16 March 2024
- 2024 Beautiful Mint Life, 11 May 2024
- 2024 Seoul Park Music Festival, 29 June 2024
- 2024 Have a Nice Trip, 28 July 2024
- Busan International Rock Festival 2024, 5 October 2024
- 7 ROCK PRIME 2024, 28 December 2024

=== International festivals and/or joint performances ===
- Germany Taubertal Festival 2018, 9- 12 August 2018
- LOST & ESCAPE - Nerd Connection x 椅子樂團, 30 August 2024

== Awards ==
Year	Award/ competition	Ranking	Ref.
2018	Emergenza World Band Competition 2018 Korea	First Place	
2018	Emergenza World Band Competition 2018	Ninth Place	

== Other activities ==
- Nerd Connection participated in the arrangement of the song 'Ordinary Day' which was sung by Bae Suzy, appearing in Episode 8 of Netflix's TV Show Doona! (released on 20 October 2023)
- Regular 2nd album Still Us pop-up store held 6–12 September 2024
- Pop-up store signing event held 7 September 2024

== Notes ==
1. The scheduled offline date was 7 March 2020 however due to the COVID-19 pandemic it was postponed and later uploaded as a video
2. Nerd Connection's first time performing at a University Festival (at KAIST)
3. This was cancelled as a sign of respect to the Itaewon Stampede (see Seoul Halloween crowd crush)
4. Cancelled due to an increase in social distancing measures as a result of the COVID-19 pandemic
5. Nerd Connection participated as South Korea's representative band
6. This was a joint performance between Nerd Connection and the Taiwanese band, THE CHAIRS
7. Nerd Connection advanced to the finals however left the show on 9 May 2022 due to issues they had with the contents of their contract with MNET
