= I Can See Your Voice (South Korean game show) =

South Korean television game show

- Promotional poster
- Hangul: 너의 목소리가 보여
- RR: Neoui moksoriga boyeo
- MR: Nŏŭi moksoriga poyŏ
- Genre: Game show
- Created by: Lee Seon-young
- Presented by: Kim Bum-soo (1–3); Leeteuk (Super Junior) (1–10); Yoo Se-yoon (1–10); Kim Jong-kook (4–10)
- Starring: The celebrity panelists (see cast)
- Country of origin: South Korea
- Original language: Korean
- No. of seasons: 10
- No. of episodes: Regular: 122; Special: 5; Overall: 127

Production
- Producers: Hwang Na-hye; Lee Seon-young
- Camera setup: Multi-camera
- Production companies: CJ ENM; Signal Entertainment Group

Original release
- Network: Mnet; tvN
- Release: February 26, 2015 – May 10, 2023

I Can See Your Voice (Korean: 너의 목소리가 보여) is a South Korean television mystery music game show created by Lee Seon-young and produced by CJ ENM, featuring its format where guest artist(s) attempt to eliminate bad singers from the group, until the last mystery singer remains for a duet performance. It first aired on Mnet and tvN on February 26, 2015.

== Gameplay ==
=== Format ===
Over the course of several rounds, the guest artist(s) must attempt to eliminate bad singers from a group of "mystery singers", identified only by their occupation or alias, without ever hearing them perform live. They are assisted by clues regarding the singers' backgrounds, style of performance, and observations from a celebrity panel. At the end of a game, the last remaining mystery singer is revealed as either good or bad by means of a duet between them and one of the guest artists. (Note: Gameplay notes: The number of mystery singers are set to six (from 4th to 10th season), seven (from 1st to 3rd season), eight (from 1st to 2nd season), or nine (for the 1st season).; In the 10th season, the "surprise" entrant(s) refer to mystery singer(s) standing inside an enclosure to remain concealed, until its revelation by being eliminated or a final performance by one of the guest artists.; The number of rounds are set to three (from 2nd to 10th season) or four (for the 1st season).)

The winning mystery singer, regardless of being good or bad, gets a reward on the following conditions:

- If the last remaining mystery singer is good, they are granted to release a digital single; if a singer is bad, they win ₩5,000,000.
- In the Global Invasion special (of its fifth season), the winning mystery singer, regardless of being good or bad, receives a trophy.

=== Rounds ===
==== Visual rounds ====
- s1–3, 9: The guest artist is given some time to observe and examine each mystery singer based on their appearance.
- s1–2: A muted video of each mystery singer that reveals only 0.3 seconds of their singing voice is played as an additional hint.
- s4–7: Each mystery singer is given two different identities as a good and bad singer, with one of them is a real identity.
- s8: The host is given three "keywords" based on mystery singer's identity.
- s10: The guest artist is given some time to observe and examine five out of six mystery singers, according to year of birth.

==== Introduction round ====
- s1: Each mystery singer self-introduces to guest artist and panelists. Good singers are telling the truth, while bad singers are allowed to lie.

==== Lip sync rounds ====
- s1–3: Each mystery singer performs a lip sync to a song; good singers mime to a recording of their own, while bad singers mime to a backing track by another vocalist.
- s4–5: A mystery singer and a substitute lip sync together in a single song, with one of them is an owner of that recording.
- s6–7: The mystery singer lip syncs to the good singer's recording, then a bad singer's recording comes in the middle of the performance.
- s8–9: Each mystery singer performs a lip sync on separate phases, with the good singer's recording first, and then the bad singer's last.
- s10: Each mystery singer self-introduces to guest artist and panelists and then performs a song, both on lip sync renditions.

==== Interrogation rounds ====
- s1: The guest artist may ask questions to the remaining mystery singers. Good singers are required to give truthful responses, while the bad singers must lie.
- s8: The guest artist must pick one of three given "keywords" to question one of the mystery singers after detailing additional information about them.
- s9: Each mystery singer has to confess what kind of identity they have if the singer is bad.

==== Evidence rounds ====
- s1–3: A proof of each mystery singer's singing ability (i.e. photo, video, certificates, etc.) is shown on the screen. Good singers have own evidences, while bad singers had their evidences fabricated.
- s6–7: The hosts have randomly assigned clues about the mystery singer, and then the guest artist must choose a clue for each one.
- s10: The guest artist is presented with a video package including witnesses reacting to one of the mystery singers when they hear on its own performance that would appear on the show.

==== Rehearsal round ====
- s4–5: Three random panelists are wearing headphones to listen to a recording of assigned mystery singer that lasts for 15 seconds. Afterward, the panelist defends the mystery singer and convince the guest artist to choose them for a final performance.

== Production ==
In 2012, television producer Lee Seon-young initially planned to develop a singing reality competition show "involving only good singers", which she would later add unusual elements such as "bad singers", lip sync, and a "guessing game" flair, thus creating the "mystery music game show" format in the process. She also originally envisioned a program that allows anyone to be the "main character" regardless of their appearances, with Kim Bum-soo taking inspiration, who struggled to gain recognition because of his look.

I Can See Your Voice formally announced as part of Mnet's 20th anniversary programming lineup in January 2015, with CJ ENM assigning on production duties, only to be later joined by Signal Entertainment Group for its third season.

== Broadcast history ==
I Can See Your Voice debuted on February 26, 2015. One week after the first-season finale, a Star Wars special was aired on May 14, 2015, featuring reinvited mystery singers playing in a team-based showdown. After that special, CJ ENM has already renewed the series for a second season, which premiered on October 22, 2015.

In March 2016, CJ ENM renewed the series for a third season, which premiered on June 30, 2016; this was also the last time Kim Bum-soo hosting the show, as Davichi played in its finale on September 15, 2016.

After the third-season finale, CJ ENM has already renewed the series for a fourth season with Kim Jong-kook appointing as a new host, when he first played as a guest artist in its premiere on March 2, 2017.

Following the postseason showcase of its fourth season, CJ ENM has already renewed the series for a fifth season, which began with a Global Invasion special on January 26, 2018 that featured mystery singers representing from local ICSYV counterparts, continuing with regular episodes the following week.

During a press conference prior to the fifth-season premiere, host Leeteuk stated that I Can See Your Voice could possibly be renewed until the tenth season. In September 2018, a post from Mnet's official Facebook page announced the auditions for a then-upcoming sixth season, which was subsequently confirmed by CJ ENM and began airing on January 18, 2019.

A pair of promotional videos from Mnet's official YouTube channel in August 2019 announced the auditions for a then-upcoming seventh season, which was subsequently confirmed by CJ ENM and began airing on January 17, 2020. This series of its similar approach would be followed by an eighth season on January 29, 2021, and ninth season on January 29, 2022. At the time of production during the COVID-19 pandemic, health and safety protocols had also implemented.

In the closing remarks of its ninth-season finale, host Yoo Se-yoon has already announced the series' renewal for a tenth season, which premiered on March 22, 2023. For the first time since sixth season, spectators are allowed on tapings.

As the tenth season ended, CJ ENM is discussing on whether the series should revive for an 11th season.

Since from fourth to fifth season, a series of postseason showcases that aired one week after each season finale, featured an encore concert with some of invited mystery singers return to perform one last time, and a montage of their performances for the past seasons.

== Cast ==
The series employs a panel of celebrity "detectives" who assist the guest artists in identifying good and bad mystery singers throughout the game. Along with regular members, guest panelists also appear since the first season. Overall, 24 celebrities have served as panelists, with their original lineup consisting of Kim Sang-hyuk (Click-B), Julian Quintart, and Yoon Sung-ho. Later members who joined the group's duties also include Hwang Chi-yeul, Ben — from the 1st season; Han Hee-jun, Lee Sang-min, Park Hwi-soon — from the 2nd season; Jang Do-yeon from the 3rd season; Joon Park (g.o.d), Shindong (Super Junior) — from the 4th season; Jang Dong-min, DinDin — from the 6th season; Hong Yoon-hwa, Sleepy (Untouchable) — from the 7th season; Heo Kyung-hwan, Jang Wooyoung (2PM), Hanhae, Kim Ji-sook, Mijoo (Lovelyz) — from the 8th season; Eun Ji-won (Sechs Kies), Kim Na-young — from the 9th season; Park Myung-soo and Jonathan Yiombi — from the 10th season.

Designations:
Main cast member	H Hosting duties
Additional cast member	g# Total games attended, by panelists

Cast member	Seasons									
Cast member	1	2	3	4	5	6	7	8	9	10
Kim Bum-soo	H	H	H							
Leeteuk (Super Junior)	H	H	H	H	H	H	H	H	H	H
Yoo Se-yoon	H	H	H	H	H	H	H	H	H	H
Hwang Chi-yeul	5									8
Kim Sang-hyuk (Click-B)	10	13	12	18	12	12	12	12	12	8
Ben	5	7								
Julian Quintart (Note: Foreign panelists: Belgium — Julian Quintart; DR Congo — Jonathan Yiombi)	11									
Yoon Sung-ho	8									
Han Hee-jun		10	12							
Lee Sang-min		13	12	13	12	12	10	12		
Park Hwi-soon		11								
Jang Do-yeon			12	18	6					
Joon Park (g.o.d)				9	12	6	7			
Kim Jong-kook				H	H	H	H	H	H	H
Shindong (Super Junior)				17	12					
DinDin						12	12			
Jang Dong-min						6				
Hong Yoon-hwa							12	12		
Sleepy (Untouchable)							6			
Hanhae								7	12	
Heo Kyung-hwan								12	12	
Jang Wooyoung (2PM)								12		
Kim Ji-sook								6		
Mijoo (Lovelyz)								8		
Eun Ji-won (Sechs Kies)									11	
Kim Na-young									10	
Park Myung-soo										8
Jonathan Yiombi										8

== Series overview ==
Season	Episodes	Originally released		Good singers	Bad singers
Season	Episodes	First released	Last released	Good singers	Bad singers
1	11	February 26, 2015	May 7, 2015	4	7
2	14	October 22, 2015	January 21, 2016	6	8
3	12	June 30, 2016	September 16, 2016	7	5
4	18	March 2, 2017	June 29, 2017	9	9
5	11	February 2, 2018	April 20, 2018	3	8
6	12	January 12, 2019	April 5, 2019	8	4
7	12	January 17, 2020	April 3, 2020	9	3
8	12	January 29, 2021	April 16, 2021	7	5
9	12	January 29, 2022	April 16, 2022	6	6
10	8	March 22, 2023	May 10, 2023	6	2
Sp	5	May 14, 2015	April 12, 2019	1	0

== Accolades ==
Event	Year (Note: Indicates the year of ceremony)	Category	Nominee(s)	Result	Ref(s)
Cable TV Broadcasting Awards	2016	Best Production in Music Category	I Can See Your Voice	Won	
Rose d'Or	2023	Studio Entertainment Award	I Can See Your Voice (season 10)	Nominated	
