= List of I Can See Your Voice (South Korean game show) episodes =

Television game show episode list

About the series
- I Can See Your Voice is a South Korean television mystery music game show produced by CJ ENM and broadcast by Mnet and tvN.
- More about the series

Episodes overview
- Total episode(s): 127
- Aired episode(s): 122
- Special episode(s): 5

The South Korean television mystery music game show I Can See Your Voice has played a total of 10 seasons and 127 episodes; broadcasting on two different networks — Mnet and tvN from February 26, 2015 to May 10, 2023. As for milestone games, Hwang Chi-yeul played in the 100th episode on April 2, 2021.

Throughout its broadcast, the original South Korean program aired specials such as Star Wars, featuring reinvited mystery singers playing in a team-based showdown; and the Global Invasion, featuring mystery singers representing from local I Can See Your Voice counterparts. The series also went into a period of five consecutive seasons that premiered in January, between 2018 and 2022. (Note: "January seasons" period: s5: Block B — Global Invasion special on January 26, 2018; s6: Hwang Chi-yeul and Lee Sun-bin — on January 18, 2019; s7: Park Joong-hoon — on January 17, 2020; s8: Rain — on January 29, 2021; s9: Eun Ji-won (of Sechs Kies), Kim Jong-min, Tiger JK, and Jang Su-won — on January 29, 2022)

== Series overview ==
Season	Episodes	Originally released		Good singers	Bad singers
Season	Episodes	First released	Last released	Good singers	Bad singers
1	11	February 26, 2015	May 7, 2015	4	7
2	14	October 22, 2015	January 21, 2016	6	8
3	12	June 30, 2016	September 16, 2016	7	5
4	18	March 2, 2017	June 29, 2017	9	9
5	11	February 2, 2018	April 20, 2018	3	8
6	12	January 12, 2019	April 5, 2019	8	4
7	12	January 17, 2020	April 3, 2020	9	3
8	12	January 29, 2021	April 16, 2021	7	5
9	12	January 29, 2022	April 16, 2022	6	6
10	8	March 22, 2023	May 10, 2023	6	2
Sp	5	May 14, 2015	April 12, 2019	1	0

== Episodes ==
=== Season 1 (2015) ===
List of season 1 episodes
No. overall	No. in season	Guest artist(s)	Player order (Note: It refers to the guest artist(s) that have played in according to their first game; returning guest artists (which also include foreigners or former good singers, with their names displaying in italics) are not counted.)	Original release date	ROK rating (national)
1	1	Kim Bum-soo (Note: Highlights: All of show's hosts, Kim Bum-soo, Leeteuk (of Super Junior), Yoo Se-yoon (of UV), and Kim Jong-kook have been played.; Aproband (s2 ep. 11) initially assigned as guest panelists before they assisted with Jo Sung-mo for a duet performance.; Good singers Hwang Chi-yeul and Lee Sun-bin returned as guest artists.; Lee Sang-min (s5 ep. 5), Cha Tae-hyun (s9 ep. 5), and Hyojung (of Oh My Girl) (s10 ep. 4) are appointed as interim hosts.; Oh My Girl (s9 ep. 10) member YooA is also absent from tapings after she tested positive for COVID-19.; MeloMance (s10 ep. 8) designated as new players, including the returning Kim Min-seok.)	1	February 26, 2015	1.913%
2	2	Lena Park	2	March 5, 2015	1.59%
3	3	Yoon Min-soo	3	March 12, 2015	2.119%
4	4	Kim Tae-woo	4	March 19, 2015	1.675%
5	5	Baek Ji-young	5	March 26, 2015	1.898%
6	6	Kim Yeon-woo	6	April 2, 2015	1.981%
7	7	2AM	7	April 9, 2015	1.923%
8	8	Jang Yun-jeong	8	April 16, 2015	2.485%
9	9	Noel	9	April 23, 2015	1.792%
10	10	DJ Doc	10	April 30, 2015	2.089%
11	11	Ailee	11	May 7, 2015	2.054%

=== Season 2 (2015–16) ===
List of season 2 episodes
No. overall	No. in season	Guest artist(s)	Player order	Original release date	ROK rating (national)
2015
12	1	Shin Seung-hun	12	October 22, 2015	1.998%
13	2	Im Chang-jung	13	October 29, 2015	2.131%
14	3	Insooni	14	November 5, 2015	2.167%
15	4	K.Will	15	November 12, 2015	2.981%
16	5	Dynamic Duo	16	November 19, 2015	2.429%
17	6	Hwanhee	17	November 26, 2015	2.526%
18	7	Johan Kim	18	December 3, 2015	3.064%
19	8	Brown Eyed Girls	19	December 10, 2015	3.329%
20	9	Wheesung	20	December 17, 2015	3.297%
21	10	Gummy	21	December 24, 2015	3.318%
22	11	Jo Sung-mo and the Aproband	22–23	December 31, 2015	3.129%
2016
23	12	Shin Hye-sung	24	January 7, 2016	3.67%
24	13	Yoon Jong-shin	25	January 14, 2016	3.089%
25	14	Lee Jae-hoon	26	January 21, 2016	3.708%

=== Season 3 (2016) ===
List of season 3 episodes
No. overall	No. in season	Guest artist(s)	Player order	Original release date	ROK rating (national)
26	1	Park Jin-young	27	June 30, 2016	3.335%
27	2	Choi Min-soo	28	July 7, 2016	2.669%
28	3	Wonder Girls	29	July 14, 2016	2.349%
29	4	Kim Yoon-ah	30	July 21, 2016	3.234%
30	5	Jung Joon-young	31	July 28, 2016	2.892%
31	6	Jessi	32	August 4, 2016	2.639%
32	7	Yoon Sang	33	August 11, 2016	2.903%
33	8	John Park	34	August 18, 2016	2.337%
34	9	2PM	35	August 25, 2016	2.4%
35	10	g.o.d	36	September 1, 2016	2.643%
36	11	I.O.I	37	September 8, 2016	2.345%
37	12	Davichi	38	September 15, 2016	2.817%

=== Season 4 (2017) ===
List of season 4 episodes
No. overall	No. in season	Guest artist(s)	Player order	Original release date	ROK rating (national)
38	1	Kim Jong-kook	39	March 2, 2017	2.577%
39	2	Haha and Skull	40–41	March 9, 2017	2.043%
40	3	Koyote	42	March 16, 2017	3.008%
41	4	Got7	43	March 23, 2017	2.29%
42	5	Lyn	44	March 30, 2017	2.518%
43	6	Roy Kim	45	April 6, 2017	2.415%
44	7	H.O.T.	46	April 13, 2017	2.239%
45	8	Super Junior	47	April 20, 2017	2.579%
46	9	EXID	48	April 27, 2017	2.542%
47	10	Highlight	49	May 4, 2017	3.086%
48	11	Roo'ra	50	May 11, 2017	3.151%
49	12	Kim Won-jun	51	May 18, 2017	2.086%
50	13	Twice	52	May 25, 2017	2.107%
51	14	Kim Kyung-ho	53	June 1, 2017	2.393%
52	15	F.T. Island	54	June 8, 2017	2.161%
53	16	Hwang Chi-yeul	—	June 15, 2017	2.938%
54	17	Yoon Do-hyun	55	June 22, 2017	2.935%
55	18	Clon	56	June 29, 2017	2.764%

=== Season 5 (2018) ===
List of season 5 episodes
No. overall	No. in season	Guest artist(s)	Player order	Original release date	ROK rating (national)
56	1	The Music Works (Baek Ji-young, Minzy (2NE1), Gilgu Bonggu (GB9), U Sung-eun, Kim So-hee, and Yuvin (Myteen))	58–62	February 2, 2018	3.714%
57	2	Wanna One	63	February 16, 2018	3.626%
58	3	Red Velvet	64	February 23, 2018	1.4%
59	4	JYP Family (Wooyoung (2PM), Yubin (Wonder Girls), JB (Got7), Baek A-yeon, and Wonpil (Day6))	65–66	March 2, 2018	3.123%
60	5	UV	67	March 9, 2018	3.243%
61	6	Mamamoo	68	March 16, 2018	3.49%
62	7	Jo Jung-chi and Choi Jung-in	69–70	March 23, 2018	3.267%
63	8	TVXQ	71	March 30, 2018	2.665%
64	9	Ha Dong-kyun and Wheesung	72	April 6, 2018	2.648%
65	10	NU'EST W	73	April 13, 2018	2.463%
66	11	Kim Jong-seo, Kim Tae-won, Kim Kyung-ho, and Park Wan-kyu	74–76	April 20, 2018	2.759%

=== Season 6 (2019) ===
List of season 6 episodes
No. overall	No. in season	Guest artist(s)	Player order	Original release date	ROK rating (national)
67	1	Hwang Chi-yeul and Lee Sun-bin	—	January 18, 2019	3.505%
68	2	Starship Family (K.Will, Soyou (Sistar), Donghyun (Boyfriend), Yoo Seung-woo, Jeong Se-woon, Jaehee (Mind U), Kihyun (Monsta X), Yeonjung (WJSN), and Baek In-tae (Duetto)	77–84	January 25, 2019	3.426%
69	3	Simon Dominic, Gray, Loco, and Code Kunst	85–88	February 1, 2019	3.008%
70	4	Koyote	—	February 8, 2019	3.527%
71	5	Lena Park and Gummy	—	February 15, 2019	3.775%
72	6	Seventeen	89	February 22, 2019	3.013%
73	7	Brave HongCha (Hong Kyung-min, Cha Tae-hyun, and Samuel)	90–92	March 1, 2019	4.265%
74	8	Crush, Rhythm Power, Dynamic Duo, Ha:tfelt, and Kim Seon-jae	93–95	March 8, 2019	2.378%
75	9	Mamamoo	—	March 15, 2019	2.845%
76	10	Noh Sa-yeon and Lee Moo-song	96–97	March 22, 2019	3.314%
77	11	Hwanhee and Lyn	—	March 29, 2019	2.752%
78	12	Bolbbalgan4	98	April 5, 2019	2.992%

=== Season 7 (2020) ===
List of season 7 episodes
No. overall	No. in season	Guest artist(s)	Player order	Original release date	ROK rating (national)
79	1	Park Joong-hoon (Note: Despite not singing, they were still counted as guest artists.)	99	January 17, 2020	3.083%
80	2	Hong Jin-young	100	January 24, 2020	3.565%
81	3	Super Junior	—	January 31, 2020	2.209%
82	4	Apink	101	February 7, 2020	2.1%
83	5	Ahn Hyun-mo and Rhymer	102–103	February 14, 2020	2.222%
84	6	So Chan-whee, Hwangbo, and Kim Hyun-jung	104–106	February 21, 2020	1.7%
85	7	Shin Hyun-joon	107	February 28, 2020	2.4%
86	8	Yoon Sang, Lee Hyun-woo, and Kim Hyun-chul	108–109	March 6, 2020	2.5%
87	9	Noh Sa-yeon and Noh Sa-bong	110	March 13, 2020	2.5%
88	10	Shin Seung-hun	—	March 20, 2020	2.4%
89	11	Kim Min-jun	111	March 27, 2020	2%
90	12	Jaurim	112	April 3, 2020	2.465%

=== Season 8 (2021) ===
List of season 8 episodes
No. overall	No. in season	Guest artist(s)	Player order	Original release date	ROK rating (national)
91	1	Rain	113	January 29, 2021	3.013%
92	2	Kim Soo-ro	114	February 5, 2021	2.469%
93	3	Haha and Byul	115	February 12, 2021	3.176%
94	4	Ha Dong-kyun and Kim Feel	116	February 19, 2021	2.833%
95	5	Kang Daniel and Baek Ji-young	117	February 26, 2021	2.738%
96	6	SHINee	118	March 5, 2021	2.389%
97	7	Song Ga-in	119	March 12, 2021	2.648%
98	8	Super Junior	—	March 19, 2021	2.268%
99	9	Mamamoo	—	March 26, 2021	2.143%
100	10	Hwang Chi-yeul	—	April 2, 2021	2.218%
101	11	Jang Hyuk	120	April 9, 2021	1.998%
102	12	Ahn Jae-wook	121	April 16, 2021	2.413%

=== Season 9 (2022) ===
List of season 9 episodes
No. overall	No. in season	Guest artist(s)	Player order	Original release date	ROK rating (national)
103	1	Eun Ji-won (Sechs Kies), Kim Jong-min, Tiger JK, and Jang Su-won	122–124	January 29, 2022	1.955%
104	2	Pak Se-ri and Park Tae-hwan	125–126	February 5, 2022	3.68%
105	3	Jessi and Monika Shin	127	February 12, 2022	2.706%
106	4	M.O.M. (Jee Seok-jin, KCM, and Wonstein	128–130	February 19, 2022	2.768%
107	5	Davichi	—	February 26, 2022	2.225%
108	6	The Blue	131	March 5, 2022	2.264%
109	7	Johan Kim (Solid), Kim Jae-hwan, and Lee Seok-hoon (SG Wannabe)	132–133	March 12, 2022	1.913%
110	8	Lee Yoon-ji and Park Hyun-bin	134–135	March 19, 2022	2.52%
111	9	Im Chang-jung and Yoon Min-soo (Vibe)	—	March 26, 2022	2.468%
112	10	Oh My Girl	136	April 2, 2022	2.191%
113	11	Mamadoll (Kahi and Park Jung-ah)	137–138	April 9, 2022	2.092%
114	12	Sung Si-kyung	139	April 16, 2022	2.321%

=== Season 10 (2023) ===
List of season 10 episodes
No. overall	No. in season	Guest artist(s)	Player order	Original release date	ROK rating (national)
115	1	Shin Hyun-joon and Jung Joon-ho	140	March 22, 2023	2.027%
116	2	Yoshihiro Akiyama (Note: Foreign guest artist: Japan — Yoshihiro Akiyama) and Mo Tae-bum	141–142	March 29, 2023	1.407%
117	3	Lee Seok-hoon (SG Wannabe) and Tei	143	April 5, 2023	1.859%
118	4	Kim Ho-joong	144	April 12, 2023	1.624%
119	5	Kwon Il-yong and Pyo Chang-won	145–146	April 19, 2023	1.454%
120	6	Kara	147	April 26, 2023	1.492%
121	7	Jay Park and The Korean Zombie	148–149	May 3, 2023	1.433%
122	8	MeloMance	150	May 10, 2023	1.465%

== Specials ==
List of special episodes
No.	Title	Guest artist(s)	Player order	Original release date	ROK rating (national)
1	"Star Wars"	—	—	July 14, 2015	1.429%
2	"Postseason Showcase — season 4"	—	—	July 6, 2017	2.91%
3	"Global Invasion"	Block B	57	January 26, 2018	3.571%
4	"Postseason Showcase — season 5"	—	—	April 27, 2018	1.902%
5	"Postseason Highlights — season 6"	—	—	April 12, 2019	2.706%
