= The East Light =

South Korean boy band

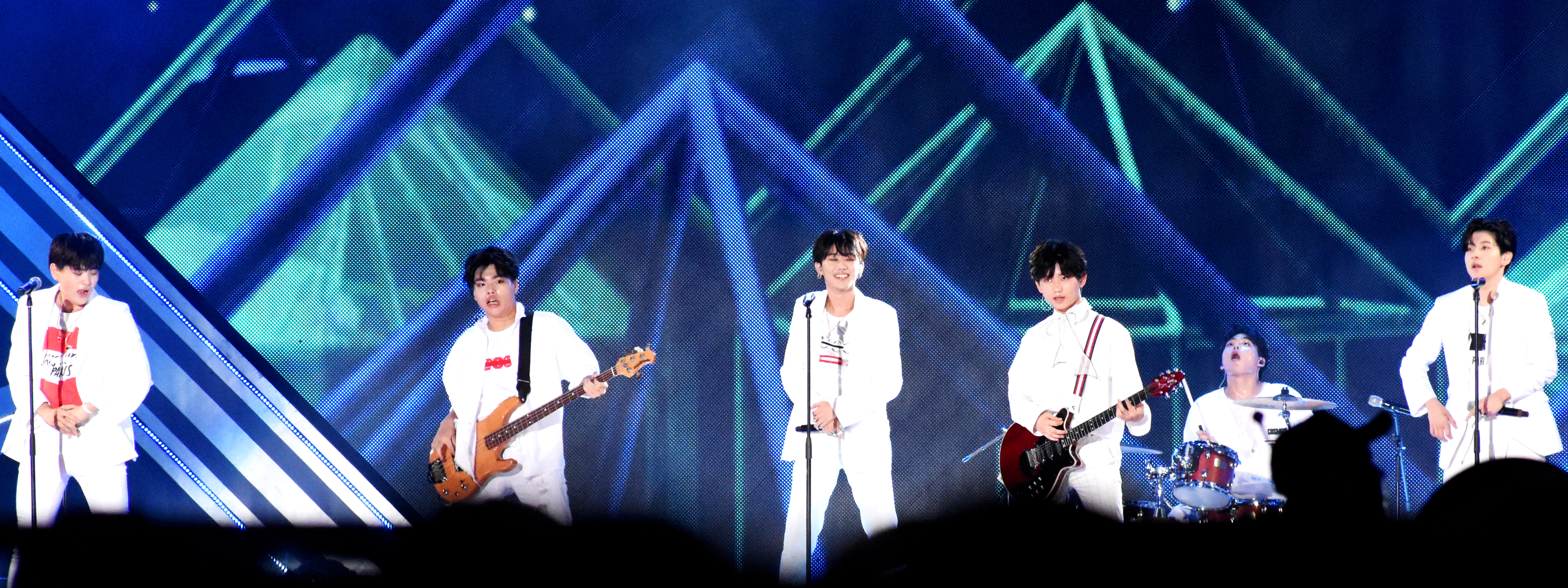
- The East Light at the 2018 Incheon Airport Sky Festival

Background information
- Origin: Seoul, South Korea
- Genres: Rock; pop rock; pop; electronic
- Years active: 2016–2018
- Label: Media Line Entertainment
- Past members: Seokcheol; Eunsung; Seunghyun; Junwook; Sagang; Woojin
- Website: www.officialeastlight.com

The East Light (Hangul: 더 이스트라이트, stylized as TheEastLight.) was a South Korean band formed by Media Line Entertainment. The band originally consisted of six members, who made their official debut with the single "Holla" on November 3, 2016. Brother members Seokcheol and Seunghyun later spoke out and filed a lawsuit against the agency, while Media Line Entertainment has removed Eunsung, Junwook, Sagang and Woojin from the group to prevent future complications from the lawsuit.

== History ==
Prior to debuting, Eunsung, Woojin, and Sagang were contestants on the Mnet show Voice Kids Korea. Sagang was also a contestant on the Mnet show Superstar K3, while Eunsung had made a cameo appearance in Monstar as the young Kyu-dong and Seokcheol appeared in the 2014 film My Boy alongside Cha In-pyo and Lee Tae-ran. Junwook appeared on the SBS show Star King as the "thirteen-year-old guitar prodigy".

In 2017, Woojin competed on Produce 101 Season 2 and finished in 34th place. Eunsung and Sagang also competed on I Can See Your Voice (season 4 episode 10) and became the winners of the episode, winning the chance to duet with Highlight (the guest) and releasing a digital single titled "Café Latte" (a cover of the Urban Zakapa song).

Sagang has appeared as an MC on a game show called 놀자고go on EBS (Educational Broadcasting System), presenting with Ji Min-hyuk, Min Ka-rin (A member of Elris), Hyeju, and Jeong Seong-yeong.

== Abuse allegations ==
On October 18, 2018, news outlet XSportsNews reported allegations of physical and mental abuse against members of The East Light by a producer, while the CEO watched the abuse and did nothing about it. On his and his brother's behalf, Seokcheol held a press conference on October 19, 2018, confirming the abuse allegations.

Media Line Entertainment issued an apology, but denied some of the allegations made by the media. On October 22, 2018, Media Line Entertainment announced that they terminated the contracts of members Eunsung, Sagang, Woojin and Junwook. On January 8, 2019, the CEO of Media Line Entertainment was indicted for child abuse.

== Past members ==
- Lee Seok-cheol (Hangul: 이석철) – leader, drums, DJ
- Lee Eun-sung (이은성) – vocals, keyboards
- Lee Seung-hyun (이승현) – bass guitar
- Kim Jun-wook (김준욱) – guitars
- Jeong Sa-gang (정사강) – vocals, guitars
- Lee Woo-jin (이우진) – vocals, keyboards

== Discography ==
=== Extended plays ===
Title	Details	Peak chart positions	Sales
Title	Details	KOR	Sales
Six Senses	Released: July 26, 2017; Label: Media Line Entertainment, Genie Music; Formats: CD, digital download; Track listing: 1. I Got You; 2. Happy Day (기분 좋은 날); 3. You’re My Love (Tropical Mix); 4. Love Is... (사랑은...); 5. My Love (내사랑); 6. Holla Original Mix; 7. I Am What I Am (나는 나) Tropical Mix; 8. I Got You Acoustic Mix	10	KOR: 3,993

=== Single albums ===
Title	Details
Holla	Released: November 3, 2016; Label: Media Line Entertainment, Genie Music; Formats: CD, digital download; Track listing: 1. Holla (홀라); 2. I Am What I Am (나는 나); 3. Holla (홀라) inst.; 4. I Am What I Am (나는 나) inst.
You're My Love	Released: May 18, 2017; Label: Media Line Entertainment, Genie Music; Formats: CD, digital download; Track listing: 1. You're My Love Tropical Mix; 2. You're My Love Rock Mix; 3. You're My Love Acoustic Pop Mix
Love Is.... (사랑은....) (Woojin & Sagang)	Released: July 13, 2017; Label: Media Line Entertainment, Genie Music; Format: Digital download; Track listing: 1. Love Is... (사랑은...) Radio Mix; 2. Love Is... (사랑은...) Extended Mix
Real Man (레알 남자)	Released: January 18, 2018; Label: Media Line Entertainment, LOEN Entertainment; Format: Digital download; Track listing: 1. Real Man (레알 남자); 2. Don't Stop; 3. 너와 둘이

=== Music videos ===
Year	Title
2016	"Holla"
2016	"I Am What I Am"
2017	"You're My Love (Tropical Mix)"
2017	"Love Is..."
2017	"I Got You"
2018	"Real Man"
2018	"Are You Okay"
2018	"Love Flutters"

=== Other videos ===
Year	Title
2016	"I Am What I Am" (Lyric Music Video)
2017	"I Am What I Am (Tropical Remix)"
2017	"You're My Love (Rock Mix)"
2017	"My Love" (One Take Video)
