= Lucky Seven (game) =

Fast game of competitive solitaire

- Designers: Martin H. Samuel
- Illustrators: Great American Puzzle Factory
- Publishers: Great American Puzzle Factory
- Players: 1 +
- Setup time: 1 minute
- Playing time: 5 - 15 minutes
- Age range: 7 and up
- Skills: Luck, addition.

Lucky Seven is a fast game of competitive solitaire, played with coasters using luck and points accumulation. It may be played by any number of players, and is usually played solitaire.

The game was designed by Martin H. Samuel when in Zurich, Switzerland. The simple central game mechanic is a mathematical formula known as a strange loop.

Great American Puzzle Factory, Inc. of South Norwalk, Connecticut, United States, published the game in 2003. Family Games, Inc. of Montreal, Quebec, Canada, published an edition of the game in 2015.

== Gameplay ==
Lucky Seven is played with seven numbered coasters (per player) on a flat surface. The goal of the game is to turn all seven coasters number side up, to accrue the most points.

With more than one player, the coasters are shuffled, players each choose a coaster and the player with the highest number starts.

The coasters are shuffled and laid in a row number-side down. The player turns over any coaster and leaves it in place number-side up. The exposed number on the coaster determines the position of the next coaster to be turned over, and so on. The player keeps going to see if all coasters can be turned over. If the player turns over a coaster with a number denoting the position of one already turned, he or she is "bust" and the coasters are then shuffled and passed to the next player.

Alternatively, each player may have a set of Lucky Seven coasters and all play a solitaire game simultaneously.

Players keep their own score throughout the game, which may be played for each hand, a certain number of hands or to an agreed points total. When the game is over, the player with the most points is the winner.

== Awards ==
- Major Fun 2008 Family
