= The Voice Kids (South Korean TV series) =

2013 South Korean television series

- Promotional poster
- Genre: Talent show
- Presented by: Jun Hyun-moo
- Country of origin: South Korea
- Original language: Korean

Production
- Production location: South Korea
- Running time: 90 minutes

Original release
- Network: Mnet
- Release: 4 January – 1 February 2013

The Voice Kids (Korean: 보이스 키즈) is a South Korean reality singing television competition for children aged 6 to 14 on Mnet. It is based on the Dutch reality singing competition of the same name. No information on a second season was revealed as of 2025.

== Series overview ==
Team Seo
Team Yoon
Team Yang

South Korean The Voice Kids series overview
| Season | First aired | Last aired | Winner | Runner-up | Third place | Winning coach | Presenters | Coaches (chairs' order) | | |
| Season | First aired | Last aired | Winner | Runner-up | Third place | Winning coach | Presenters | 1 | 2 | 3 |
|---|---|---|---|---|---|---|---|---|---|---|
| 1 | January 4, 2013 | February 1, 2013 | Kim Myung-ju | Heo Seong-ju | Seo Yu-ri | Yang Yo-seob | Jun Hyun-moo | Seo | Yoon | Yang |
