= Click-B =

South Korean boy band

Click-B 클릭비
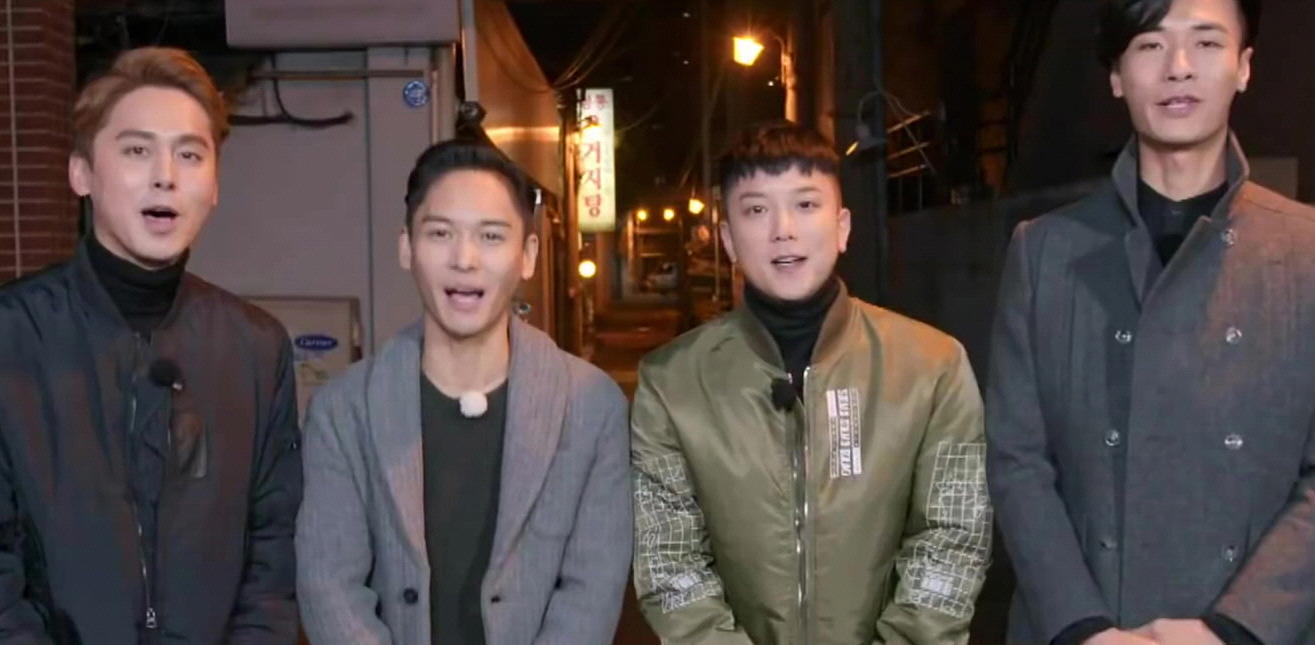
- Click-B in November 2015

Background information
- Origin: Seoul, South Korea
- Genres: K-pop; hip hop; pop rock; dance
- Instruments: bass; guitar; drums
- Years active: 1999–2006; 2011; 2015
- Label: DSP Media
- Members: Woo Yun-suk; Oh Jong-hyuk; Kim Sang-hyuk; Kim Tae-hyung; Ha Hyun-gon; Yoo Ho-suk; No Min-hyuk

Click-B (Korean: 클릭비) is a South Korean boy band formed in August 1999 under DSP Media. Click-B started out as a band combining rock and dance beats in their music. They became a four member group in 2002, with several member changes over the next few years. In 2015, the group made a seven member comeback with the single album Reborn.

== History ==
Click-B formed in August 1999 under Daesung Entertainment (now DSP Media).

The band split in 2002, with 4 members remaining. In 2003, the 4th album was released with Woo Yun-suk, Oh Jong-hyuk, Kim Sang-hyuk, and Kim Tae-hyung. In 2004, they joined the k-pop duo, J-Walk (consisting of two previous Sechskies members Jang Suwon and Kim Jaeduck) to form a project band, JnC. After JnC, member Kim Tae Hyung left the group to pursue personal interests.

In 2006, Click-B (with the previous arrangement of 3 remaining members Oh Jong-hyuk, Woo Yun-suk and Kim Sang-hyuk) released their 5th album "Smile".

In 2011, Click-B (with all seven members) got together for a brief comeback with two new singles, "To Be Continued" in April and "빈 자리 (Empty Seat)" in November.

On December 14, 2013, DSP Media organized a concert 'DSP Festival' at Jamshil Arena where Click-B performed as a group along with other artists under the same management. A few members were absent for various reasons: Evan (Yoo Ho-suk) was still serving his military obligation, Kim Sang-hyuk was on hiatus from the entertainment industry and Kang Hoo (Kim Tae-hyung) was busy with his acting career.

In August 2015, a comeback with all seven members was announced, later confirmed for October. DSP Media announced the group would hold its first concert after thirteen years since debut, "7-3=7" on November 21. The group released "Reborn" on October 21.

== Members ==
- Kim Tae-hyung (김태형)
- Woo Yun-suk (우연석)
- Oh Jong-hyuk (오종혁)
- Kim Sang-hyuk (김상혁)
- Ha Hyun-gon (하현곤)
- Yoo Ho-suk (유호석)
- No Min-hyuk (노민혁)

== Discography ==
=== Studio albums ===
- Click-B (1999)
- Challenge (2000)
- Click-B3 (2001)
- Cowboy (2003)

=== Compilation albums ===
- To You (너에게) (2002)
- The Best of Click-B (2004)
- Smile (2006)

=== Singles ===
- "Reborn" (2015)

=== Digital singles ===
- "To Be Continued" (2011)
- "Empty Seat" (빈 자리, 2011)

== Concert and tour ==
- Click-B in Live Festival (2000)
- The Legend of Seven Princes (2001)
- Click-B Concert "Growing Up" (2002)
- Click-B Concert "A Midsummer Night" (2002)
- #3 Live Concert (2003)
- 7-3=7 (2015)

== Awards ==
=== Mnet Asian Music Awards ===
Year	Category	Work	Result	Ref.
2000	M.net Japan Viewer's Choice Award	—N/a	Won	
2001	Best Male Group	"Undefeatable" (백전무패)	Nominated	
2002	Best Male Group	"To Be Continued"	Nominated	
