= 24 Horas (Mexican TV program) =

Mexican television newscast (1970–1998)

- Presented by: Weekdays: Jacobo Zabludovsky
- Country of origin: Mexico

Production
- Running time: 1 hour

Original release
- Network: Las EstrellasTelevisa
- Release: 1970 – 1998

24 Horas (24 Hours) was a Mexican television news program broadcast from 1970 to 1998, presented by Jacobo Zabludovsky. It aired on El Canal de las Estrellas for 27 years, beginning on September 7, 1970. As the longest-running news show on Mexican television, it achieved nearly three uninterrupted decades of broadcasting. The program ended on Monday, January 19, 1998, although Zabludovsky continued working at Televisa until 2000. 24 Horas was highly influential and became the most-watched news show in Mexico.

This news show was the first to be produced entirely by a dedicated news team from the same network, without relying on newspaper articles.

== History ==
In 1952, Jacobo Zabludovsky took on various roles as a writer and substitute presenter for news programs. In 1969, the Mexican television company Telesistema Mexicano (later renamed Televisa) established its General Directorate of News. This led to the creation of informational segments on the company’s channels, which were initially brief and produced on a limited budget. Subsequently, a one-hour program titled Café Matutino, hosted by Zabludovsky, was introduced. This show served as a precursor to 24 Horas.

In its early years, 24 Horas was broadcast in the evenings from Monday to Friday. In the mid-1970s, an afternoon edition titled 24 Horas de la Tarde was launched. In later years, the program also aired on Saturdays.

On September 1, 1988, under Jacobo Zabludovsky's direction, Empresa de Comunicaciones Orbitales (ECO) began broadcasting as the first 24-hour Spanish-language news network, with operations centers in Miami, Florida, and Mexico City. However, Zabludovsky eventually returned to Mexico following conflicts with the system's workers and reporters, who accused him of bias and adherence to Mexican government censorship. The project remained on air until 2001, when Televisa canceled it due to low profitability.

== Criticisms ==
The program's editorial stance was criticized for being pro-government, aligning with the Mexican government's communication policies, and reflecting the views of Televisa's owner, Emilio Azcárraga Milmo. In an interview, Azcárraga referred to his company as a "soldier" serving the Institutional Revolutionary Party (PRI), Mexico's ruling party between 1929 and 2000 (a period which included 24 Horas' entire 28-year run), and the then-Mexican president, Ernesto Zedillo.

The newscast was viewed by the opposition and the independent press as an obstacle to the establishment of democracy in Mexico. Its pronounced pro-government bias, lack of plurality, servility to the presidential figure, and frequent attacks on government opponents led to several citizen boycotts during the 1980s.

=== Decline and end ===
In response to these criticisms, along with the introduction of limited freedom of expression on certain restricted television channels, significant changes occurred in the Mexican media landscape. The sale of TV Azteca in 1993 and the appointment of Emilio Azcárraga Jean as president of Televisa in 1997 brought a renewed vision aimed at modernizing and adapting the network's news programming to contemporary times.

As part of this transformation, the decision was made to discontinue 24 Horas in favor of the newly established news division, Noticieros Televisa. The final broadcast of 24 Horas featured a retrospective on its legacy, highlighting landmark news moments that defined an "era," along with a farewell celebration to mark the end of its run.

Later, Jacobo Zabludovsky transitioned to a new phase in radio journalism, working primarily with networks such as Radio Red and others outside the Televisa group. Despite this, he occasionally served as an advisor to Noticieros Televisa. Over the course of his career, he received numerous awards and honors for his contributions to journalism.

=== Noticieros Televisa ===
After the end of the almost uninterrupted broadcast of the 24 Horas newscast, the successors of this newscast were specially prepared by this new news division. The first was conducted by the reporter who previously hosted the morning newscast Al Despertar, who collaborated sporadically with 24 Horas, Guillermo Ortega Ruiz. However, some time later and already at the beginning of the new century, a second restructuring was carried out, and Joaquín López-Dóriga was assigned to this night news space, who occupied that place from April 2000 to August 2016, and was replaced in that space by the journalist Denise Maerker.

== Journalists and collaborators ==
Many renowned Mexican journalists and newsreaders began their careers on this show, including:

- Jacobo Zabludovsky†
- Joaquín López-Dóriga
- Ricardo Rocha Reynaga
- Juan Ruiz Healy
- Lolita Ayala
- Heriberto Murrieta
- Fernando Schwartz
- Guillermo Ortega Ruiz
- Abraham Zabludovsky Nerubay
- Juan Manuel Damián

=== Journalists ===
- Graciela Leal
- Luis Aguilar Chávez†
- Salvador Estrada
- Guillermo Pérez Verduzco†
- Fernando Alcalá
- Juan Manuel Rentería
- Patricia Donneaud
- Norma Meraz
- Félix Cortés Camarillo
- Gregorio Meraz
- Guillermo Herrera
- Rita Ganem†
- Laura Padilla
- Agustín Granados
- Ana Cristina Peláez
- Juan José Prado
- Juan Francisco Castañeda
- Francisco Ramírez
- Fernando del Monte Ceceña
- Magdalena García de León
- Philippe Bac
- Amador Narcia
- Rocío Villagarcía
- Laura Martínez Alarcón
- Rafael Vieyra Matouk
- Virginia Sendel-Lemaitre
- Martha Venegas
- Helen Sztrigler
- Cynthia Lara
- Ma. Cristina Espinoza
- Julieta Berganza
- Silvia Lemus
- Maxine Woodside
- Talina Fernández
- Martha Renero
- Francisco Patiño
- Elda Sánchez Gaytán
- Alejandro Llano
- José María Rebolledo
- Salvador Carrillo Martínez
- Rocío González Trápaga
- Raúl René Trujillo
- Ricardo Peña Navarrete
- Héctor Jaime Mendoza
- Primitivo López
- Juan Sebastián Solís
- Susana Solís

== Correspondents ==
- Valentina Alazraki (Italy and the Vatican)
- Philippe Bac (Canada and France)
- Félix Cortés Schöler (Germany)
- Ignacio Espinoza (Miami-USA)
- Jesús Hermida (Washington)
- Federico Knoblauch (Germany)
- Mario Lechuga (Texas-USA)
- María Almendra McBride
- Marcelo Luis Ojeda (Argentina)
- Alberto Peláez (Spain)
- Joaquín Peláez
- María Elena Rico (Soviet Union/Russia)
- Horacio Rocha Staines (Great Britain)
- Eva Usi (Germany)
- Erica Vexler (Israel)
- Ariel Roffe (Israel)
- Kassia Wyderko (Yugoslavia)
- Marissa Céspedes (New York)
- José Luis Belmar (Sweden)

After the final broadcast of 24 Horas, most of the correspondents continued their work on Televisa's new global news program, Noticieros Televisa, including Alazraki, Belmar, Céspedes, Pelaez, and Wyderko. Later, some correspondents were replaced.
