= N+ (news agency) =

Mexican television news service

NMás
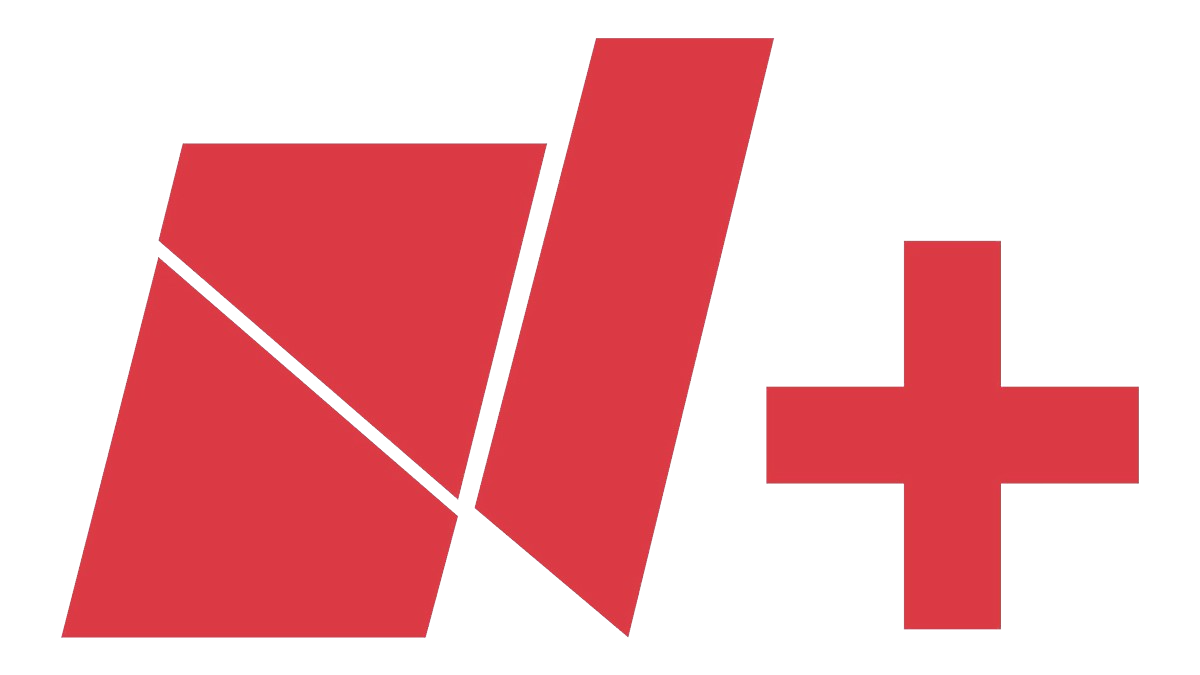
- Industry: Journalism
- Headquarters: 28 Chapultepec Avenue, Doctores, Mexico City, Mexico
- Products: National and local news
- Parent: TelevisaUnivision; Tritón Comunicaciones
- Website: nmas.com.mx

N+ (read as ene más, [eneˈmas]) formerly known as Noticieros Televisa, is a news agency owned by TelevisaUnivision and operated by Tritón Comunicaciones. It produces news programming for TelevisaUnivision's television networks in Mexico and the United States. Founded in 1998 as Noticieros Televisa, the organization was led by Leopoldo Gómez, who oversaw news production for Grupo Televisa in Mexico.

In 2022, following the restructuring of Grupo Televisa and the creation of TelevisaUnivision, which unified its Mexican and US media operations, the agency was rebranded as N+. It produces news content in Mexico and operates Channel 4 (N+ Foro). Beginning in 2026, it is also set to operate N+ Univision in the US.

== History ==
=== 1998-2016: the launch of Noticieros Televisa ===
After Emilio Azcárraga Jean took over as President of Televisa in April 1997, one of his first moves was to rebuild and restructure the news department and give a more contemporary, stand-alone image; Leopoldo Gómez, an executive close to Azcárraga, was named vice-president of News. The changes became far-ranging, and the biggest casualty would be 24 Horas, Jacobo Zabludovsky's long-running newscast, long regarded as a mouthpiece of the government. As part of the changes, Zabludovsky retired from the anchor desk, whilst remaining on Televisa as an anchor of special reports.

The new executives then began working on its successor programs, all named El Noticiero; which debuted on January 20, 1998. Guillermo Ortega, then anchor of morning newscast Al Despertar, was tapped to succeed Zabludovsky in the main 10 p.m. edition; Jacobo Zabludovsky's son, Abraham Zabludovsky, would stay as anchor of the afternoon edition. Gómez would also name Federico Wilkins as executive producer of the newscasts; Wilkins, a Cuban-born producer, had become criticized for its tabloid, aggressive and lurid approach to news over at rival TV Azteca, which led Hechos to beat 24 Horas for a time. Wilkins changed completely the style of Televisa's newscasts, doing away with the image of government mouthpiece, but taking the same tabloid approach of its main competitor; this style would help Televisa regain the traditional leadership in the ratings, with TV Azteca still offering stiff competition.

Other notable personalities who have hosted Televisa newscasts over the years include Lolita Ayala, Guillermo Ortega, Adela Micha, Carlos Loret de Mola and Víctor Trujillo ("Brozo").

In 2003, the division moved into a new newsroom in a newly built expansion of Televisa's Chapultepec headquarters, designed and built by Broadcast Design International in Los Angeles. The space centralized all operations of the division, including studios for the newscasts, into a single space.

=== 2016-2022: relaunch ===
As part of wide-ranging changes to Televisa's content offerings, on August 22, 2016, all Noticieros Televisa offerings were completely revamped. As part of the changes, Televisa's flagship 10 p.m. newscast began to be anchored by Denise Maerker; additionally, the running time was shortened from 60 to 30 minutes, to allow for a faster and punchier format. Morning newscast Primero Noticias was replaced by three distinct programs: Las Noticias, an early round-up broadcast anchored by Danielle Dithurbide, Despierta, a longer-form, investigative journalism and opinion-focused broadcast anchored by Carlos Loret de Mola, and Al Aire, a lighter news magazine show with Paola Rojas. Lolita Ayala's newscast was replaced by El Noticiero con Karla Iberia Sánchez, whose running time was also reduced to 30 minutes.

Additionally, a completely rebuilt newsroom studio, designed in-house, and an increased reliance on social media and long-form reporting were pursued as part of the new concept; the division would also collaborate with Televisa's premium drama division Televisa Alternative Originals to co-produce historically themed series, the first of which was An Unknown Enemy, co-produced for Amazon Prime Video. Initially, the new programs received strong criticism from specialized media analysts, and suffered from low ratings from the inception; the fake news controversy surrounding its coverage of the 2017 Mexico City earthquake didn't help matters, causing ratings to dip into record lows and helping TV Azteca and new rival Imagen Televisión to threaten Televisa in the lead; over time, the format would return to a more traditional style, causing ratings to increase and stabilize.

=== 2022-present: N+ ===
In early 2022, in anticipation of the formation of TelevisaUnivision and to conform regulatory issues, the Grupo Televisa was effectively split into three companies: Televisa, which continues to be listed in the Mexican Stock Exchange, would retain its shares in Izzi Telecom, Sky México and publishing businesses, and broadcast licenses to operate free-to-air TV stations across Mexico; Mexico-based content production businesses, the operation of four national free-to-air television networks in Mexico and specialty TV channels, and the "Televisa" trademark itself, would be combined with Univision Communications in the United States to form TelevisaUnivision, 45% of which would be owned by Televisa; and Tritón Comunicaciones, which would take responsibility of national and local news operations for TelevisaUnivision's Mexican domestic free-to-air TV networks.

On March 28, 2022, the new consumer-facing brand, N+, was unveiled, which serves as the overarching brand for all operations of the division, including Noticieros Televisa. As part of the relaunch, the company announced ramping up the production of digital original content, including the full launch of N+ Media, a streaming news channel offering separate programming aimed at a younger audience, available on the company's website and through TelevisaUnivision's Vix streaming service. As part of the brand launch, all of Televisa's news programs, including those aired on Foro and by Televisa's regional and local stations, adopted a single corporate image, giving a common style across local and national television news.

== Programs ==
=== Mexico ===
Most of TelevisaUnivision's Mexican newscasts are broadcast on its Las Estrellas network, covering the main time slots throughout the day. The flagship 10:00 p.m. newscast (known as En Punto or En Punto con Enrique Acevedo), which had been anchored by Denise Maerker since 2016, has been hosted by Enrique Acevedo since 2023. Maerker remains involved as executive producer.

Among the weekday morning programs, Despierta stands out, airing from approximately 7:00 to 9:00 a.m. and anchored by Danielle Dithurbide, alongside contributors such as Enrique Campos and Eduardo Salazar. As for the afternoon/early evening newscast, El Noticiero con Karla Iberia Sánchez moved from Las Estrellas to Nu9ve in 2018 and 2020 the channel's only regularly scheduled news program. Karla Iberia Sánchez continues to lead the program (it was broadcast at approximately 2:30 PM.), which is now part of the N+ news brand and maintains a focus on in-depth reporting, coverage, and plural analysis.

==== N+ Foro ====
In 2010, Televisa launched FOROtv (stylized as Foro TV or FOROtv) on February 15, initially as a cable and satellite channel. On August 30 of that year, Mexico City's Channel 4 (XHTV-TDT) underwent a complete restructuring to become the channel’s primary over-the-air signal, dedicated exclusively to news, analysis, and documentary programming. It became commonly known as Foro. The channel is broadcast in Mexico City on Channel 4 (XHTV-TDT) and is also carried as a subchannel or rebroadcast signal on several Televisa Regional stations in major cities. In March 2022, the network was rebranded simply as Foro. In September 2024, it adopted its current name, N+ Foro, as part of its integration into TelevisaUnivision's N+ news brand.

=== United States ===
Noticias Univision was established in 1987 following the rebranding of the Spanish International Network (SIN) as Univision, and has since consolidated its position as a leading Spanish-language news organization in the United States for more than four decades. Following the integration of news operations and content between Televisa and Univision in 2022, TelevisaUnivision rebranded its news division from Noticias Univision to N+ Univision in early 2026, with the news operation jointly managed under the N+ and Univision, led by Leopoldo Gómez.
