= Veo cómo cantas (Mexican game show) =

Mexican television game show

- Genre: Game show
- Based on: I Can See Your Voice by CJ ENM
- Directed by: Miguel Ángel Fox
- Presented by: Omar Pérez Reyes
- Starring: Erika Buenfil; Beto Cuevas (La Ley); José Eduardo Derbez; Natalia Téllez
- Country of origin: Mexico
- Original language: Spanish
- No. of episodes: Regular: 7; Special: 1; Overall: 8

Production
- Producer: Miguel Ángel Fox
- Camera setup: Multi-camera
- Production company: Fremantle

Original release
- Network: Las Estrellas
- Release: 20 August – 8 October 2023

Related
- I Can See Your Voice franchise

Veo cómo cantas (transl. I see how you sing) is a Mexican television mystery music game show based on the South Korean program I Can See Your Voice, featuring its format where the guest artist and contestant(s) attempt to eliminate bad singers from the group, until the last mystery singer remains for a duet performance. It first premiered on the American Spanish-language network Univision on 6 August 2023, followed by its Mexican airing debut on Las Estrellas on 20 August 2023.

== Gameplay ==
=== Format ===
Over the course of five rounds, the guest artist and contestant(s) must attempt to eliminate bad singers from a group of ten "mystery singers", identified only by their occupation or alias, without ever hearing them perform live. They are assisted by clues regarding the singers' backgrounds, style of performance, and observations from a celebrity panel. At the end of a game, the last remaining mystery singer is revealed as either good or bad by means of a duet between them and one of the guest artists. (Note: Gameplay notes: The number of mystery singers are set to ten.; This lineup was actually used in Star Wars special of the original South Korean 1st season.; Until the 2nd round, the game partially used a "battle format" (adapted from Giọng ải giọng ai) due to having two opposing contestants.; Each contestant has its own podium with mystery singer selections from a respective group (with the 1st podium picks 1 to 5, while the 2nd picks 6 to 10). Beginning in the 3rd round, selections are merged into a single group.)

In the first two or three rounds, two oppposing contestants must eliminate one mystery singer from an assigned group. Afterward, the contestant having of a least one or two bad singer eliminations will proceed to the next round.

The contestant must eliminate one mystery singer at the end of each round, receiving MX$20,000 if they eliminate a bad singer. At the end of a game, if the contestant decides to walk away, they will keep the money had won in previous rounds; if they decide to risk for the last remaining mystery singer, they win MX$500,000 if a singer is good, or lose their all winnings if a singer is bad.

=== Rounds ===
1. Group playback (Spanish: Playback de grupo)
  Ten mystery singers are divided into two groups of quintets, and each of them would have to perform lip sync individually.
2. Discover my life (Spanish: Descubre mi vida)
  The guest artist and contestant are presented with a video package containing possible clues by one of the mystery singers.
3. Secret studio (Spanish: Estudio secreto)
  The guest artist and contestant are presented with video from a recording session by one of the mystery singers, but pitch-shifted to obscure their actual vocals.
4. Playback challenge (Spanish: Desafío playback)
  A pair of mystery singers perform a lip sync of their own through a showdown to one song each. At the conclusion of the performances, the guest artist and contestant eliminates one performer from each group.
  - Optionally, the contestant may use the Golden Mic once during the game, in which they may hear additional clues and observations from a celebrity guest off-stage.
5. Interrogation (Spanish: Interrogatorio)
  The guest artist and contestant may ask questions to the remaining mystery singers. Good singers are required to give truthful responses, while the bad singers must lie.

== Production ==
During Visión21 upfronts in October 2020, Televisa formally acquired the rights to produce a Mexican adaptation of I Can See Your Voice under its tentative title Me late que cantas (English: I feel you sing), following the success of ¿Quién es la máscara?; this was also subsequently announced as part of CJ ENM's dealing with Fremantle the next month. In the following upfronts in May 2023, Veo cómo cantas title would be adapted from the Spanish counterpart, as well as Univision co-airing with its original Mexican network Las Estrellas; TeleOnce also planned to air the game show in Puerto Rico in July 2023, but was never materialized due to the Liberman Media Group did not have broadcasting rights from TelevisaUnivision.

Besides from the main program, a postgame aftershow also airs virtually, and is co-hosted by Pablo Chagra and Gabriel Coronel.

== Episodes ==
=== Guest artists ===
Legend:
Good singer
Bad singer
— The contestant chose to risk the money.
— The contestant chose to walk away with the money.

Episode (Note: The series aired games through different dates on Las Estrellas (in Mexico) and Univision (in the United States), particularly due to scheduling conflicts with 1st season of La Casa de Los Famosos México.)				Guest artist (Note: Players' notes: For the returning guest artists (who also include foreigners and former good singers), names are displayed in italics.; For the mixed groups, names who identified as bad singers are displayed in italics.)	Contestants	Mystery singers (In their respective numbers and aliases)							
Las Estrellas (MEX)		Univision (USA)		Guest artist	Contestants	Elimination order							Winner
#	Date	#	Date	Guest artist	Contestants	Group playback	Discover my life	Secret studio		Playback challenge		Interrogation	Winner
1	20 August 2023	3	Same	Sofía Reyes	Lisbeth Garamendi MX$20,000	4. Alan Neri; (Content Creator)	5. Emma Calo; (Industrial Engineer)	3. Karla Elisa Cubillo; (Therapist)		Eliminated			
1	20 August 2023	3	Same	Sofía Reyes	Rubén Álvarez → MX$500,000	6. Edgar Cabas; (Yoga Instructor)	7. Edgar Espinosa; (Graphic Designer)	9. Mariana Turati; (Comedian)		8. Luis Alfredo Solís Flores; (Audio Engineer)	10. Betzaida Ramírez; (Housewife)	2. Quetzalli Bulnes; (Sports Commentator)	1. Pablo Alarcón; Physical Trainer
2	27 August 2023	4	Same	Omar Chaparro	Karla Gabriela González → MX$0	5. Carlos Luna; (Hotdog Vendor)	2. Oneil Núñez; (Volleyball Player)	6. Teresa Peragui; (Parkourist)		4. Brigit "La Diosa Celta" Ella; (Luchadora)	9. Abraham Ruiz; (Stylist)	7. Guillermo Proal; (Actor)	1. Marigel Reyes; Announcer
2	27 August 2023	4	Same	Omar Chaparro	Mario Alberto Carillo MX$20,000	8. Ángel dela Torre; (Charro)	10. Dania Ávila; (Pole Dancer)	3. Nahomy Campas; (University Student)		Eliminated			
Sp	3 September 2023	Sp	24 September 2023	Lasso (Note: Foreign guest artists: Argentina — Ricardo Montaner; Chile — Beto Cuevas (La Ley); Venezuela — Lasso)	Mariana Ruvalcaba → MX$80,000	5. Memo Schutz	4. Efraín Velarde	8. Ana Caty Hernández		3. Martha Cristiana	10. Germán Ortega	7. Oka Giner	2. Jorge Losa
Sp	3 September 2023	Sp	24 September 2023	Lasso	Fernando Murguía MX$20,000	6. Alberto Peláez	9. Alfredo Oropeza	1. Emmanuel Palomares		Eliminated			
3	10 September 2023	6	Same	Paty Cantú	Vanessa Espinoza MX$20,000	3. Juan Pedro Cruz; (Street Sweeper)	5. Valentina Salazar; (Jockey)	Eliminated					
3	10 September 2023	6	Same	Paty Cantú	Jonathan Mariano → MX$80,000	6. Sergi Granado; (Dietitian)	8. Alejandra Zapala; (Cosmetician)	7. Enya Meraz; (Student)	4. Pablo Melin; (Environmental Engineer)	9. José Mauricio Couturier; (Fisherman)	10. Daniel Ochoa; (Construction Worker)	2. Leslie Harrell; (Cheerleader)	1. Claudia Fuentes; Administrator
4	17 September 2023	7	Same	Edith Márquez (Timbiriche)	Gabriela Fajardo → MX$500,000	5. Leonardo Díaz; (Transport Businessman)	3. Christian Cárdenas; (Accountant)	2. Lynn Aimee Galaviz Rocha; (Restaurant Employee)	7. Vincenzo Caccia; (Fitness Trainer)	10. Estela Siaruqui; (Preschool Teacher)	8. Fátima Bocanegra; (Painter)	4. Arturo dela Fuente; (Photographer)	1. Mariana Cruz; Numerologist
4	17 September 2023	7	Same	Edith Márquez (Timbiriche)	Peter Aguilar MX$20,000	6. Carlos Santamaría; (Cyclist)	9. Karla Lozano Meza; (Tennis Player)	Eliminated					
5	24 September 2023	1	6 August 2023	Ricardo Montaner	Rosa María López MX$20,000	2. Monica Plehn; (Actress)	3. Ana Bellatrix; (Make-up Artist)	6. Samantha Sandoval; (Tattoo Artist)		Eliminated			
5	24 September 2023	1	6 August 2023	Ricardo Montaner	Sara González → MX$500,000	8. Rodrigo Marín; (Lawyer)	7. Alejandra Briseño; (Entrepreneur)	1. Roberto Ponce; (Dancer)		9. Kay Stanfield; (Biologist)	5. Carlos Morantes; (Fashion Designer)	10. Diego Garciasela; (Influencer)	4. Abel Rasa; Soldier
6	1 October 2023	2	13 August 2023	Beto Cuevas (La Ley)	Alejandra Mayén → MX$0	2. Selene Sánchez; (Wedding Planner)	3. Anaís Loz; (Figure Skater)	9. Adrian Andres; (Taekwondo Player)		8. Óscar Calderón; (Gamer)	7. Paulette Gallardo; (Soccer Player)	4. Marcell Muñoz; (Model)	1. Jorge Menduet; Event Producer
6	1 October 2023	2	13 August 2023	Beto Cuevas (La Ley)	Bryan Fernando Montiel MX$20,000	10. Bethzaida Martínez; (Ghostbuster)	6. Sofía "Sopita" Vázquez; (Clown)	5. Luis Brindis; (Biochemist)		Eliminated			
7	8 October 2023	5	3 September 2023	Edén Muñoz	Marisol Noreña → MX$500,000	1. Ramnses Villegas; (Real Estate Consultant)	4. Mario Sebastián Ocampo Falcón; (Swimmer)	9. Juan Carlos Quibar; (English Teacher)	2. Yina Martinez; (Psychologist)	6. María Ivanova; (Assistant Dean)	5. Mario Girón; (Student)	7. Rubén Acacio; (Waiter)	3. Erika Albero; Journalist
7	8 October 2023	5	3 September 2023	Edén Muñoz	Jehovanny Torres MX$0	10. Reyna Mota; (Communication Specialist)	8. Diana Ivette Moal; (Clothing Dealer)	Eliminated					

=== Panelists ===
Legend:
Regular panelist
Additional panelist
Guest panelist
Golden Mic member

Apps		Panelists in attendance (Sorted by first appearance, with episode designations)
g#	p#	Panelists in attendance (Sorted by first appearance, with episode designations)
8	2	Erika Buenfil and José Eduardo Derbez (1–7; sp. 1)
5	2	Natalia Téllez (1, 3, 5–7); Beto Cuevas (La Ley) (Note: Panelists' note: Foreign attendees: Horario Pancheri (ARG); Beto Cuevas (La Ley) (CHL); Alexis Ayala (USA); and Marjorie de Sousa and Ricardo Montaner (VEN)) (3–5, 7; sp. 1)
3	2	Ricardo Montaner (1–2, 6); Marjorie de Sousa (2, 4; sp. 1)
1	3	Adriana Louvier (1); Alexis Ayala (3); Horacio Pancheri (6)

== Reception ==
Legend:
Highest rated episode
Lowest rated episode

=== Mexico ===
No.	Title	Air date	Timeslot (CT)	Viewing percentage		Viewing population		Ref(s)
No.	Title	Air date	Timeslot (CT)	Grp. 19–44	OVA	Grp. 19–44	Total	Ref(s)
1	"Sofía Reyes"	20 August 2023	Sunday, 9:00 pm	1.8%	2.8%	0.381	1.621	
2	"Omar Chaparro"	27 August 2023	Sunday, 9:00 pm	1.9%	2.6%	0.405	1.505	
Special	"Lasso"	3 September 2023	Sunday, 9:00 pm	2.1%	2.9%	0.437	1.679	
3	"Paty Cantú"	10 September 2023	Sunday, 9:00 pm	1.6%	2.4%	0.343	1.39	
4	"Edith Márquez"	17 September 2023	Sunday, 9:00 pm	2.1%	2.8%	0.44	1.621	
5	"Ricardo Montaner"	24 September 2023	Sunday, 9:00 pm	1.6%	2.2%	0.34	1.274	
6	"Beto Cuevas"	1 October 2023	Sunday, 9:00 pm	2%	2.6%	0.418	1.505	
7	"Edén Muñoz	8 October 2023	Sunday, 9:00 pm	2.2%	2.8%	0.474	1.621	

Source: Nielsen IBOPE Mexico (Total watching population: Grp. 19–44 – 21,296,137 • OVA – 57,901,054)

=== United States ===
Viewership and ratings per episode of Veo cómo cantas
No.	Title	Air date	Timeslot (ET)	Rating/share (18–49)	Viewers (millions)	Ref.
1	"Ricardo Montaner"	6 August 2023	Sunday, 7:00 pm	0.20/3	0.801	
2	"Beto Cuevas"	13 August 2023	Sunday, 7:00 pm	0.18/2	0.772	
3	"Sofía Reyes"	20 August 2023	Sunday, 7:00 pm	0.19/2	0.821	
4	"Omar Chaparro"	27 August 2023	Sunday, 7:00 pm	0.11/1	0.541	
5	"Edén Muñoz"	3 September 2023	Sunday, 7:00 pm	0.19/2	0.724	
6	"Paty Cantú"	10 September 2023	Sunday, 7:00 pm	0.15/1	0.728	
7	"Edith Márquez"	17 September 2023	Sunday, 7:00 pm	0.17/1	0.724	
Special	"Celebrity special (feat. Lasso)"	24 September 2023	Sunday, 7:00 pm	0.13/1	0.657	

Source: Nielsen Media Research
