= Leopoldo Gómez =

Mexican journalist and media executive

- Born: Leopoldo Gómez González
- Education: Anahuac University; Georgetown University (PhD)
- Occupations: Journalist, media executive, political analyst
- Years active: 1990s–present
- Employer: TelevisaUnivision
- Known for: President of Univision News; Vice President of Noticieros Televisa (2000–2021)
- Awards: Premio Ondas Iberoamericano (2004, 2012); Mexican National Journalism Award (2004, 2006); Premio Rey de España (2012–2013)

Leopoldo Gómez González is a Mexican journalist, political analyst, and media executive. He served as Vice President of Noticieros Televisa from 2000 to 2021, and as President of Univision News (later TelevisaUnivision News Division) during two separate tenures: from 2021 to 2023, and again from January 2026 onward. He is also a former moderator of the Mexican political debate program Tercer Grado and executive producer of the Amazon Prime Video series Un extraño enemigo.

== Early life and education ==
Gómez received a law degree from Anahuac University in Mexico City, and later earned a doctorate in government from Georgetown University in Washington, D.C.

== Career ==
=== Public service and academia ===
Before joining Televisa, Gómez served as Undersecretary of Energy Operation in the Mexican Ministry of Energy during the administration of Ernesto Zedillo, when Luis Téllez Kuenzler was Secretary of Energy. He has taught Mexican and Latin American politics at Georgetown University, Brown University, and the Instituto Tecnológico Autónomo de México (ITAM).

=== Noticieros Televisa (2000–2021) ===
Gómez was appointed Vice President of Noticieros Televisa on February 16, 2000, a position he held for more than 21 years. During his tenure he oversaw all of the company's national newscasts and informational programs.

In 2006 he became moderator and director of the weekly political debate program Tercer Grado, a role he held until August 2021.

Gómez left Noticieros Televisa in July 2021.

=== Univision News, first tenure (2021–2023) ===
On July 19, 2021, Univision announced Gómez's appointment as President of Univision News, succeeding Daniel Coronell. He relocated from Mexico to the United States to assume the role. During this period he oversaw the launch of the streaming service Noticias Univision 24/7 and the WhatsApp fact-checking platform elDetector.

Under his leadership, Univision News received two Edward R. Murrow Awards and three News and Documentary Emmy Awards.

Gómez stepped down from the role on July 14, 2023, to "pursue other interests", and was succeeded on an interim basis by María Martínez-Guzmán.

=== FTI Consulting (2024) ===
In May 2024, Gómez joined FTI Consulting as a senior advisor for the firm's Latin American practice, focusing on strategic communications, crisis management, and stakeholder risk assessment.

=== Univision News, second tenure (2026–present) ===
On December 8, 2025, TelevisaUnivision announced Gómez's return as President of Univision News, effective January 1, 2026, succeeding Daniel Coronell. Shortly after assuming the role, he led the integration of TelevisaUnivision's Mexican (N+) and U.S. (Univision News) news operations under the unified brand N+ Univision.

== Productions ==
Gómez was executive producer of the Televisa political thriller series Un extraño enemigo, which premiered on Amazon Prime Video in 2018 and depicted the political tensions surrounding the 1968 Mexican student movement and the presidency of Luis Echeverría.

Earlier documentary series productions include México: La Historia de su Democracia (2004) and El Encanto del Águila (2011).

== Academic work ==
Gómez has published in academic journals including the Journal of International Affairs, Foro Internacional, Nexos, and Política y Gobierno, published by the Centro de Investigación y Docencia Económicas (CIDE).

He has also been a columnist for the Mexican newspaper Milenio.

== Awards ==
- Mexico's National Journalism Award (2004, for México: La Historia de su Democracia; 2006, for Tercer Grado).
- Premio Ondas Iberoamericano de Radio y Televisión (2004 and 2012).
- Premio Rey de España (2012–2013 edition, Television category, for the episode "El último caudillo" of El Encanto del Águila).
