= Amorita Rasgado =

Mexican actress

- Born: 14 May 1989 (age 37); Santo Domingo Tehuantepec, Oaxaca, Mexico
- Occupation: Actress
- Years active: 2004–present
- Known for: Women in Blue

Amorita Rasgado (born 14 May 1989) is a Mexican actress of Zapotec descent from Santo Domingo Tehuantepec, Oaxaca. She is best known for playing Gabina, one of the four leads in the Apple TV+ crime drama Women in Blue (Las Azules), since 2024.

== Early life and education ==
Rasgado was born and raised in Santo Domingo Tehuantepec, on the Isthmus of Tehuantepec in southern Oaxaca. She began acting in 1997 with the Grupo de Teatro Tehuantepec, a local company run by Marco Petriz, and made her stage debut with the group in 1998 in Oscura ventana.

She later moved to Mexico City to train professionally, studying under Ludwik Margules at the Foro de Arte Contemporáneo and at the Centro Universitario de Teatro of the National Autonomous University of Mexico (UNAM), before continuing her training at the Creative Institute in Vancouver. The Vancouver studies were funded by a scholarship she won at the 2004 Expresión en Corto festival.

== Career ==
Rasgado's first screen role was the lead, Sandra, in Enrique Arroyo's 2004 short film El otro sueño americano, about a teenage girl who attempts to cross into the United States, drawn from the femicides in Ciudad Juárez. She won the best actress award and the Vancouver scholarship at the seventh Expresión en Corto International Film Festival in Guanajuato, and best actress at the Pantalla de Cristal festival. The film itself won best short at the Clermont-Ferrand International Short Film Festival in 2005.

In 2009 she played Márgara in Carlos Carrera's Backyard (El traspatio), written by Sabina Berman, which also dealt with the Juárez killings. Her other credits include the HBO series Capadocia, the Netflix series El Dandy, and the Amazon Prime Video comedy Locas por el cambio (2020), in which she played La Wicha. In 2023 she appeared alongside Yalitza Aparicio in Selma Cervantes's short Sweatshop Girl (Chica de fábrica), which premiered at the 2023 Sundance Film Festival. She also completed filming on Gustavo Loza's Welcome al Norte, opposite Silverio Palacios.

=== Women in Blue ===
In 2024 Rasgado was cast as Gabina, one of four leads in Women in Blue, a crime drama inspired by the formation of Mexico City's first female police force in 1971, alongside Bárbara Mori, Ximena Sariñana and Natalia Téllez. Her character is a sheltered young woman who has wanted to be a police officer since childhood, and who is disowned by her father, a senior inspector, and her detective brother when she joins the force. The first season premiered on 31 July 2024. The series was renewed in May 2025 with Rasgado returning, and the second season premiered on 12 August 2026.

The series was nominated for the International Emmy Award for Best Drama Series in 2025, losing to Rivals. At the 2025 Premios Aura, Rasgado was nominated for Best Acting Debut for the role, and the series won Best Cast.

=== Theatre and community work ===
Rasgado has continued to work on stage, including in the children's play Las aventuras de Frida, directed by Anahí Allué at the Teatro Silvia Pinal in Mexico City. Through AmorArte, a film club she founded, she has organised screenings of Mexican films and talks with actors in Zapotec communities of the Isthmus.

== Filmography ==
=== Film ===
Year	Title	Role	Notes
2004	El otro sueño americano	Sandra	Short film
2009	Backyard	Márgara	
2014	Elvira, te daría mi vida pero la estoy usando		
2016	La 4ª Compañía	Naná	
2020	Locas por el cambio	La Wicha	
2023	Sweatshop Girl		Short film
2023	Welcome al Norte	Teófila	

=== Television ===
Year	Title	Role	Notes
2009	Capadocia		
2015	El Dandy		
2023	El colapso	Lilia	Episode: "La refinería"
2023	Dra. Lucía: Un don extraordinario	Dra. Sagrario Martínez	
2024–present	Women in Blue	Gabina	Main role

== Awards and nominations ==
Year	Award	Category	Work	Result	Ref.
2004	Expresión en Corto International Film Festival	Best Actress	El otro sueño americano	Won	
2004	Pantalla de Cristal Festival	Best Actress	El otro sueño americano	Won	
2025	Premios Aura	Best Acting Debut	Women in Blue	Nominated	
