= Operación Triunfo (American TV series) =

American talent competition series

- Genre: Reality competition
- Based on: Operación Triunfo (Spanish TV series)
- Directed by: Juan Carlos Mazo
- Presented by: Natalia Téllez
- Judges: David Bisbal; Ximena Sariñana; Ana Bárbara
- Country of origin: United States
- Original language: Spanish
- No. of seasons: 1
- No. of episodes: 30

Production
- Executive producers: Fernando Lorente; Luciano Cardinali; Adán Bonet; Augusto Ramírez; Paola González; Josep M. Mainat; Adrià Cruz
- Production companies: Telemundo Studios; Estudios RCN; Reset TV; Mas Ros Media

Original release
- Network: Telemundo
- Release: July 7 – August 10, 2026

Related
- Star Academy

Operación Triunfo (English: Operation Triumph) is an American singing reality competition television series that premiered on Telemundo on July 7, 2026. It is based on the original Operación Triunfo from Spain and is part of the Star Academy franchise. The show is hosted by Natalia Téllez.

== Format ==
Young performers live in a boarding-school called "The Academy", where they are coached by various professionals in several artistic disciplines. The participants are continuously monitored during their stay in the academy by live television cameras. From Tuesday through Friday, recap episodes highlight the trials and tribulations of the participants at The Academy. On Sunday nights, contestants face a live Gala centered on individual performances, followed by a second live gala on Monday nights featuring group performances. Based on the judges' verdicts and viewer voting, the weakest contestant is eliminated. The eventual winner is awarded a record deal with Universal Music and US$100,000.

== Production ==
The show was announced on February 5, 2026. In-person auditions were held from March 14 to April 11. On May 7, 2026, Natalia Téllez was announced as the show's host.

In June 2026, David Bisbal, Ximena Sariñana and Ana Bárbara were announced as judges of the show.

"The Academy" is led by singer and songwriter Erika Ender, with actress Laura Flores serving as acting instructor, and Jorge Romano and David Cabrera as musical directors.

It was originally announced that the show would air for eight weeks, concluding on August 31, 2026. However, on July 30, Telemundo announced that the finale would air on August 10.

== Contestants ==
The 20 contestants who would appear at the Gala 0 were announced during the show. Of them, 16 would enter the academy and become official contestants.

| Contestant | Age | Residence | Finish | |
| Contestant | Age | Residence | Gala | Placement |
|---|---|---|---|---|
| Wandy Santana | 23 | Queens, New York | Final | Winner |
| Karol Wilson | 30 | Panama City, Panama | Final | Runner-up |
| Alana Gómez "Lalah" | 24 | Comerío, Puerto Rico | Final | 3rd |
| Leslie Álvarez Mar | 23 | Mexico City, Mexico | Final | 4th |
| Frankie García | 22 | Tamaulipas, Mexico | Final | 5th |
| Aziz Guerra | 21 | El Paso, Texas | Semifinal | 6th |
| Daniel Enrique Olivero | 24 | Miami, Florida | Semifinal | 6th |
| Jahaziel Meza | 25 | Phoenix, Arizona | Semifinal | 6th |
| Guido Encinas | 24 | Corrientes, Argentina | 5 | 9th |
| Carla Beatriz Villafane | 24 | San Juan, Puerto Rico | 4 | 10th |
| Ashley Haynie "Allie" | 22 | San Diego, California | 4 | 11th |
| Amalia Martos | 18 | New York City, New York | N/A | 12th (Withdrew) (Note: On July 30, Amalia left the competition for medical reasons.) |
| José Ángel Fernández | 22 | Mission, Texas | 3 | 13th |
| Acuarela Jiménez | 18 | Lancaster, Texas | N/A | 14th (Expelled) (Note: On July 21, Acuarela was expelled from the competition for violating a rule of conduct of the Academy.) |
| Daniella Santos | 24 | Union City, New Jersey | 2 | 15th |
| Sergio Calderón | 25 | Los Angeles, California | 1 | 16th |
| Kevin Jadiel Torres | 26 | San Juan, Puerto Rico | 0 | Not selected |
| Naomy Valbuena | 24 | Miami, Florida | 0 | Not selected |
| Tomás Herrera | 21 | Cali, Colombia | 0 | Not selected |
| Welmys Hernández "BBA" | 24 | Miami, Florida | 0 | Not selected |

== Galas ==
=== Results summary ===
Color key

| – | Contestant received the most public votes and became exempt from nomination. |
| – | Contestant was selected by the judges - Gala 0. |
| – | Contestant received immunity by the jury. |
| – | Contestant was up for elimination but was saved by the Academy's staff. |
| – | Contestant was up for the elimination but was saved by the contestants. |
| – | Contestants were up for the elimination and were the nominees of the week. |

| | Gala 0 | | Gala 1 | Gala 2 | Gala 3 | Gala 4 (Note: In Gala 4, there were no nominations. Instead, the public voted for the contestant they wanted to advance to the semifinal.) | Gala 5 | Semifinal | Final |
|---|---|---|---|---|---|---|---|---|---|
| Wandy | Selected | Sergio | Amalia | Jahaziel | Saved | Saved | Semifinalist | Finalist | Winner (Final) |
| Karol | Saved | Nominated | Amalia | Jahaziel | Lalah | Saved | Finalist | Finalist | Runner-up (Final) |
| Lalah | Selected | Karol | Allie | Carla | Nominated | Saved | Semifinalist | Finalist | 3rd Place (Final) |
| Leslie | Selected | Daniella | José Ángel | Jahaziel | Wandy | Saved | Semifinalist | Finalist | 4th Place (Final) |
| Frankie | Selected | Daniella | José Ángel | Jahaziel | Wandy | Saved | Semifinalist | Finalist | 5th Place (Final) |
| Aziz | Selected | Sergio | Amalia | Nominated | Carla | Saved | Semifinalist | Eliminated (Semifinal) | |
| Daniel | Selected | Karol | Amalia | Jahaziel | Carla | Saved | Semifinalist | Eliminated (Semifinal) | |
| Jahaziel | Selected | Karol | Amalia | Saved | Wandy | Saved | Semifinalist | Eliminated (Semifinal) | |
| Guido | Selected | Daniella | Amalia | Jahaziel | Wandy | Saved | Eliminated (Gala 5) | | |
| Carla | Selected | Nominated | Allie | Nominated | Nominated | Eliminated (Gala 4) | | | |
| Allie | Selected | Carla | Nominated | Carla | Nominated | Eliminated (Gala 4) | | | |
| Amalia | Selected | Carla | Saved | Jahaziel | Allie | Withdrew | | | |
| José Ángel | Selected | Daniella | Nominated | Nominated | Eliminated (Gala 3) | | | | |
| Acuarela | Selected | Daniella | Allie | Expelled | | | | | |
| Daniella | Saved | Saved | Nominated | Eliminated (Gala 2) | | | | | |
| Sergio | Selected | Nominated | Eliminated (Gala 1) | | | | | | |
| BBA | Eliminated | Not selected (Gala 0) | | | | | | | |
| Kevin | Eliminated | Not selected (Gala 0) | | | | | | | |
| Naomy | Eliminated | Not selected (Gala 0) | | | | | | | |
| Tomás | Eliminated | Not selected (Gala 0) | | | | | | | |
| Up for elimination | BBA; Daniella; Karol; Kevin; Naomy; Tomás | Carla; Daniella; Karol; Lalah; Sergio | Allie; Amalia; Daniella; Guido; Jośe Ángel | Aziz; Carla; Jahaziel; José Ángel; Karol | Allie; Amalia; Carla; Lalah; Wandy | None | None | Winner | Wandy; Winner |
| Saved by Academy's staff | Daniella; Karol | Lalah | Guido | Karol | Amalia | None | Karol | Winner | Wandy; Winner |
| Saved by contestants | None | Daniella; 5 of 12 votes to save | Amalia; 6 of 11 votes to save | Jahaziel; 7 of 9 votes to save | Wandy; 4 of 8 votes to save | None | None | Finalist | Karol; Runner-up |
| Saved by public vote | None | Carla; Karol; Most votes to save | Allie; José Ángel; Most votes to save | Aziz; Carla; Most votes to save | Lalah; Most votes to save | Aziz, Daniel; Frankie, Jahaziel; Karol, Lalah; Leslie, Wandy; Most votes to save | Lalah; Most votes to save | Finalist | Lalah; 3rd place |
| Saved by public vote | None | Carla; Karol; Most votes to save | Allie; José Ángel; Most votes to save | Aziz; Carla; Most votes to save | Lalah; Most votes to save | Aziz, Daniel; Frankie, Jahaziel; Karol, Lalah; Leslie, Wandy; Most votes to save | Lalah; Most votes to save | Finalist | Leslie; 4th place |
| Eliminated | BBA; Kevin; Naomy; Tomás | Sergio; Fewest votes to save | Daniella; Fewest votes to save | José Ángel; Fewest votes to save | Allie; Carla; Fewest votes to save | Guido; Fewest votes to save | Aziz; Daniel; Jahaziel; Fewest votes to save | Finalist | Frankie; 5th place |

=== Gala 0 (July 7–8, 2026) ===
- Group performances (July 7):
  - "DTMF"
  - "Oye Mi Amor"

Contestants' performances on Gala 0
| Order | Contestant | Song | Result |
Part 1 - July 7
| 1 | Acuarela | "Calidad" | Saved by the jury |
| 2 | Wandy | "La Quiero a Morir" | Saved by the jury |
| 3 | Allie | "Él Me Mintió" | Saved by the jury |
| 4 | Kevin | "Madre Tierra (Oye)" | Eliminated |
| 5 | Daniel | "Tú De Qué Vas" | Saved by the jury |
| 6 | Frankie | "Costumbres" | Saved by the jury |
| 7 | Tomás | "Tacones Rojos" | Eliminated |
| 8 | Lalah | "Rosa Pastel" | Saved by the jury |
| 9 | Sergio | "Cake by the Ocean" | Saved by the jury |
| 10 | Amalia | "Over the Rainbow" | Saved by the jury |
Part 2 - July 8
| 1 | Leslie | "Sobreviviré" | Saved by the jury |
| 2 | Karol | "Man I Need" | Saved by the academy's staff |
| 3 | José Ángel | "Ya Lo Sé Que Tú Te Vas" | Saved by the jury |
| 4 | Naomy | "Malas Decisiones" | Eliminated |
| 5 | Jahaziel | "Regalo de Dios" | Saved by the jury |
| 6 | Daniella | "Inevitable" | Saved by the academy's staff |
| 7 | Guido | "A Medio Vivir" | Saved by the jury |
| 8 | BBA | "Messy" | Eliminated |
| 9 | Carla | "Superestrella" | Saved by the jury |
| 10 | Aziz | "La Mentira" | Saved by the jury |

=== Gala 1 (July 12–13, 2026) ===
- Group performance (July 12): "Nada fue un error"
- Musical guest (July 13): Edwin Luna ("Antes De Tiempo")

Individual performances on Gala 1 - July 12
| Order | Contestant | Song | Result |
|---|---|---|---|
| 1 | Amalia | "Falsas Esperanzas" | |
| 2 | Jahaziel | "Volver, Volver" | Top 5 |
| 3 | Daniel | "Saturno" | |
| 4 | Carla | "Birds of a Feather" | Top 5 |
| 5 | Wandy | "Ahora Quien" | Top 5 |
| 6 | Frankie | "Lose Control" | |
| 7 | Daniella | "Así Fue" | |
| 8 | Jośe Ángel | "Será que no me amas" | |
| 9 | Allie | "Creep" | |
| 10 | Leslie | "La Vida Es Un Carnaval" | Top 5 |
| 11 | Acuarela | "Ese Hombre" | Immune by the jury |
| 12 | Aziz | "Dejaría Todo" | |
| 13 | Lalah | "Vampire" | |
| 14 | Guido | "Ojalá Que Llueva Café" | |

Group performances and elimination on Gala 1 - July 13
| Order | Contestant | Song | Result |
Up for elimination
| 1 | Sergio | "Beauty and a Beat" | Eliminated |
| 2 | Karol | "Qúe Bello" | Saved by the public vote |
Group performances
| 3 | Carla | "That's Not My Name" | Saved by the jury |
| 3 | Lalah | "That's Not My Name" | Saved by the jury |
| 3 | Leslie | "That's Not My Name" | Saved by the jury |
| 4 | Daniel | "Tan Sólo Tú" | Saved by the jury |
| 4 | Daniella | "Tan Sólo Tú" | Nominated by the jury; up for elimination |
| 5 | Jośe Ángel | "Robarte un Beso" | Nominated by the jury; up for elimination |
| 5 | Sergio | "Robarte un Beso" | Eliminated |
| 5 | Wandy | "Robarte un Beso" | Saved by the jury |
| 6 | Amalia | "Die with a Smile" | Nominated by the jury; up for elimination |
| 6 | Guido | "Die with a Smile" | Nominated by the jury; up for elimination |
| 7 | Frankie | "Conteo Regresivo" | Saved by the jury |
| 7 | Karol | "Conteo Regresivo" | Saved by the jury |
| 8 | Acuarela | "Mi Buen Amor" | Immune |
| 8 | Allie | "Mi Buen Amor" | Nominated by the jury; up for elimination |
| 9 | Aziz | "Que nadie sepa mi sufrir" | Saved by the jury |
| 9 | Jahaziel | "Que nadie sepa mi sufrir" | Saved by the jury |

=== Gala 2 (July 19–20, 2026) ===
- Group performance (July 19): "Somos Más"
- Musical guest (July 20): Lupillo Rivera ("Ayer Te Llamé")

Individual performances on Gala 2 - July 19
| Order | Contestant | Song | Result |
|---|---|---|---|
| 1 | Lalah | "Titanium" | |
| 2 | Karol | "Miénteme" | |
| 3 | Aziz | "Dulcito e Coco" | |
| 4 | Frankie | "¡Basta Ya!" | Top 3 |
| 5 | Guido | "Ordinary" | Top 3 |
| 6 | Leslie | "Amores Extraños" | |
| 7 | Wandy | "Adiós Amor" | Immune by the jury |
| 8 | Amalia | "Flowers" | |
| 9 | Allie | "Como la Flor" | |
| 10 | Jahaziel | "La Bachata" | |
| 11 | Daniel | "Y Hubo Alguien" | |
| 12 | Carla | "Lo Haré Por Ti" | |
| 13 | Acuarela | "Mala Fama" | |

Group performances and elimination on Gala 2 - July 20
| Order | Contestant | Song | Result |
Up for elimination
| 1 | Jośe Ángel | "Livin' la Vida Loca" | Saved by the public vote |
| 2 | Daniella | "Besos de Ceniza" | Eliminated |
Group performances
| 3 | Aziz | "Risk It All" | Nominated by the jury; up for elimination |
| 3 | Carla | "Risk It All" | Nominated by the jury; up for elimination |
| 3 | Frankie | "Risk It All" | Saved by the jury |
| 4 | Guido | "La Diferencia" | Saved by the jury |
| 4 | Daniel | "La Diferencia" | Saved by the jury |
| 5 | Allie | "Ven, Devórame Otra Vez" | Saved by the jury |
| 5 | José Ángel | "Ven, Devórame Otra Vez" | Nominated by the jury; up for elimination |
| 5 | Leslie | "Ven, Devórame Otra Vez" | Saved by the jury |
| 6 | Lalah | "Amárrame" | Immune |
| 6 | Wandy | "Amárrame" | Immune |
| 7 | Acuarela | "Deseándote" | Saved by the jury |
| 7 | Daniella | "Deseándote" | Eliminated |
| 7 | Karol | "Deseándote" | Nominated by the jury; up for elimination |
| 8 | Amalia | "Hoy Tengo Ganas de Ti" | Saved by the jury |
| 8 | Jahaziel | "Hoy Tengo Ganas de Ti" | Nominated by the jury; up for elimination |

=== Gala 3 (July 26–27, 2026) ===
- Group performance (July 26): "Pégate"
- Musical guest (July 26): La Adictiva ("Disfruté Engañarte")

Individual performances on Gala 3 - July 26
| Order | Contestant | Song | Result |
|---|---|---|---|
| 1 | Daniel | "Shivers" | |
| 2 | Frankie | "Algo de Mí" | Top 3 |
| 3 | Jahaziel | "Por Amarte Así" | Top 3 |
| 4 | Amalia | "Me Nace del Corazón" | |
| 5 | Wandy | "Suavemente" | |
| 6 | Lalah | "Es Ella Más Que Yo" | |
| 7 | Guido | "Tantita Pena" | |
| 8 | Leslie | "Drop Dead" | |
| 9 | Allie | "Espacio Sideral" | |
| 10 | Karol | "Yo Viviré" | Immune by the jury |

Group performances and elimination on Gala 3 - July 27
| Order | Contestant | Song | Result |
Up for elimination
| 1 | Aziz | "A Dónde Vamos a Parar" | Saved by the public vote |
| 2 | Carla | "Si Una Vez" | Saved by the public vote |
| 3 | Jośe Ángel | "El Amor" | Eliminated |
Group performances
| 4 | Frankie | "Querida" | Saved by the jury |
| 4 | Jahaziel | "Querida" | Saved by the jury |
| 5 | José Ángel | "¿Y Todo Para Qué?" | Eliminated |
| 5 | Leslie | "¿Y Todo Para Qué?" | Saved by the jury |
| 6 | Carla | "Cuando Me Enamoro" | Nominated by the jury; up for elimination |
| 6 | Wandy | "Cuando Me Enamoro" | Nominated by the jury; up for elimination |
| 7 | Aziz | "Salomé" | Saved by the jury |
| 7 | Daniel | "Salomé" | Immune |
| 8 | Guido | "Shallow" | Saved by the jury |
| 8 | Lalah | "Shallow" | Nominated by the jury; up for elimination |
| 9 | Allie | "Si No Te Hubieras Ido" | Nominated by the jury; up for elimination |
| 9 | Amalia | "Si No Te Hubieras Ido" | Nominated by the jury; up for elimination |
| 9 | Karol | "Si No Te Hubieras Ido" | Immune |

=== Gala 4 (August 2–3, 2026) ===
- Group performances (August 2):
  - "I Want It That Way"
  - "Where Is My Husband!"
- Musical guest (August 2): Low Clika and Yahritza y su Esencia ("So Bella")

Group performances and elimination on Gala 4 - August 2
| Order | Contestant | Song | Result |
Up for elimination
| 1 | Carla | "La Canción" | Saved by the public vote; up for elimination |
| 2 | Allie | "Dreaming of You" | Eliminated |
| 3 | Lalah | "¡Corre!" | Saved by the public vote; up for elimination |
Group performances
| 4 | Aziz | "3 A.M." | |
| 4 | Frankie | "3 A.M." | |
| 4 | Karol | "3 A.M." | |
| 5 | Allie | "Que Vuelvas" | |
| 5 | Wandy | "Que Vuelvas" | |
| 6 | Carla | "En Privado" | |
| 6 | Guido | "En Privado" | |
| 7 | Lalah | "Bailando" | |
| 7 | Leslie | "Bailando" | |
| 8 | Daniel | "Atrévete-te-te" | |
| 8 | Jahaziel | "Atrévete-te-te" | |

Individual performances and elimination on Gala 4 - August 3
| Order | Contestant | Song | Result |
Up for elimination
| 1 | Lalah | "¡Corre!" | Saved by the public vote |
| 2 | Carla | "La Canción" | Eliminated |
Regular performances
| 3 | Wandy | "¿Quién Te Dijo Eso?" | |
| 4 | Leslie | "Es Mentiroso" | |
| 5 | Aziz | "Hasta Que Me Olvides" | |
| 6 | Karol | "I'm Coming Out" | |
| 7 | Daniel | "Aunque Ahora Estés Con Él" | |
| 8 | Guido | "Puro Veneno" | |
| 9 | Jahaziel | "Bella" | |
| 10 | Frankie | "Beautiful Things" | |

=== Gala 5 (August 5, 2026) ===
Individual performances on Gala 5 - August 5
| Order | Contestant | Song | Result |
|---|---|---|---|
| 1 | Daniel | "Laura No Está" | Saved by the public vote; semifinalist |
| 2 | Leslie | "Vivir Lo Nuestro" | Saved by the public vote; semifinalist |
| 3 | Guido | "Te Quiero, Te Quiero" | Eliminated |
| 4 | Jahaziel | "Noviembre Sin Ti" | Saved by the public vote; semifinalist |
| 5 | Karol | "Como Quien Pierde Una Estrella" | Saved by the academy's staff; finalist |
| 6 | Wandy | "Vivir Sin Aire" | Saved by the public vote; semifinalist |
| 7 | Aziz | "Me Va, Me Va" | Saved by the public vote; semifinalist |
| 8 | Frankie | "When We Were Young" | Saved by the public vote; semifinalist |
| 9 | Lalah | "Calla Tú" | Saved by the public vote; semifinalist |

=== Semifinal (August 9, 2026) ===
- Group performances:
  - "No Tiene Sentido"
  - "Baile Inolvidable"

Individual performances on Semifinal Gala - August 9
| Order | Contestant | Song | Result |
|---|---|---|---|
| 1 | Karol | "¡Basta Ya!" | Already qualified |
| 2 | Aziz | "Shivers" | Eliminated |
| 3 | Lalah | "Inevitable" | Saved by the public vote; finalist |
| 4 | Daniel | "Ordinary" | Eliminated |
| 5 | Jahaziel | "Y Hubo Alguien" | Eliminated |
| 6 | Frankie | "Creep" | Saved by the jury; finalist |
| 7 | Wandy | "Por Amarte Así" | Saved by the jury; finalist |
| 8 | Leslie | "Lose Control" | Saved by the jury; finalist |

=== Final (August 10, 2026) ===
- Group performance: "This Is Me"

Individual performances on Final Gala - August 10
| Order | Contestant | Final Song | Order | Gala 0 Song | Result |
|---|---|---|---|---|---|
| 1 | Leslie | "Never Enough" | N/A (already eliminated) | | 4th place |
| 2 | Karol | "Malportada" | 6 | "Man I Need" | Runner-up |
| 3 | Frankie | "Unholy" | N/A (already eliminated) | | 5th place |
| 4 | Wandy | "Tu Amor Me Hace Bien" | 7 | "La Quiero a Morir" | Winner |
| 5 | Lalah | "Side to Side" | 8 | "Rosa Pastel" | 3rd place |

== Ratings ==
Viewership and ratings per season of Operación Triunfo
| Season | Timeslot (ET) | Episodes | First aired | | Last aired | | Avg. viewers (millions) |
| Season | Timeslot (ET) | Episodes | Date | Viewers (millions) | Date | Viewers (millions) | Avg. viewers (millions) |
|---|---|---|---|---|---|---|---|
| 1 | Sun–Fri 7:00 p.m. | 30 | July 7, 2026 | 1.65 | August 10, 2026 | TBD | TBD |
