= Joaquín López-Dóriga =

Mexican journalist (born 1947

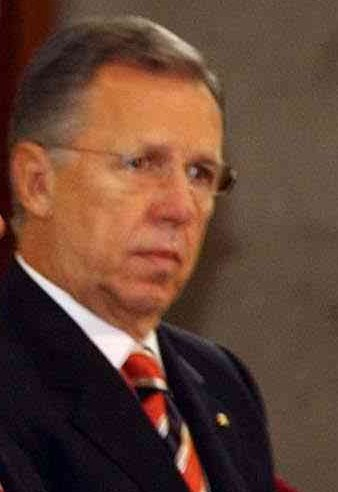
- López-Dóriga in 2005
- Born: Joaquín López-Dóriga Velandia; 7 February 1947 (age 79); Madrid, Spain
- Occupation: Journalist
- Years active: 1969–present
- Website: lopezdoriga.com

Joaquín López-Dóriga Velandia (born 7 February 1947), also nicknamed "El Teacher", is a Mexican journalist.

Born in Madrid, Spain, his family moved to Mexico in 1956 following his father's death. López-Dóriga studied law, but did not complete the course and worked as a reporter for El Heraldo de México instead. López-Dóriga has hosted news programs for Televisa and Radio Fórmula, including the prime-time evening newscast from 2000 to 2016.

== Early life and education ==
Joaquín López-Dóriga Velandia was born in Madrid, Spain, on 7 February 1947. He is the son of Joaquín López-Dóriga, a naval and military engineer, and María José Velandia, who held a doctorate in Romance philology. When he was a child, his father died, and in 1956 his mother took him and his sister to live in Mexico. López-Dóriga attended the Cumbres Institute, where he began to lose his Spanish accent and developed an interest in sports. During high school, he tried studying architecture, chemical engineering, and medicine, but ended studying law and working at a notary's office. When he started college, he studied law at Anáhuac University. López-Dóriga did not complete the degree, leaving two courses outstanding. The university later offered him the opportunity to finish his studies, but he declined because he had no intention of practicing law.

== Career ==
After López-Dóriga started college, he worked as a journalist for the El Heraldo de México after being recommended by the principal of Cumbres Insitute. Two years later, he joined Jacobo Zabludovsky in the television news program 24 Horas. In 1988 he was appointed news director of the Instituto Mexicano de la Televisión (Imevisión).

He hosted the late evening news show El Noticiero con Joaquín López-Dóriga on Canal de las Estrellas from 2000 to 2016. He hosts the radio talk show López-Dóriga for Radio Fórmula, writes for Milenio, and co-hosted the talk show Tercer Grado in Televisa until 2023. He was a member of the National Human Rights Commission Consultant Council.

Media offices
Preceded by Guillermo Ortega Ruiz	Televisa Nightly News Anchor; 3 April 2000 – 19 August 2016	Succeeded by Denise Maerker
