= Danielle Dithurbide =

Mexican journalist and TV news anchor

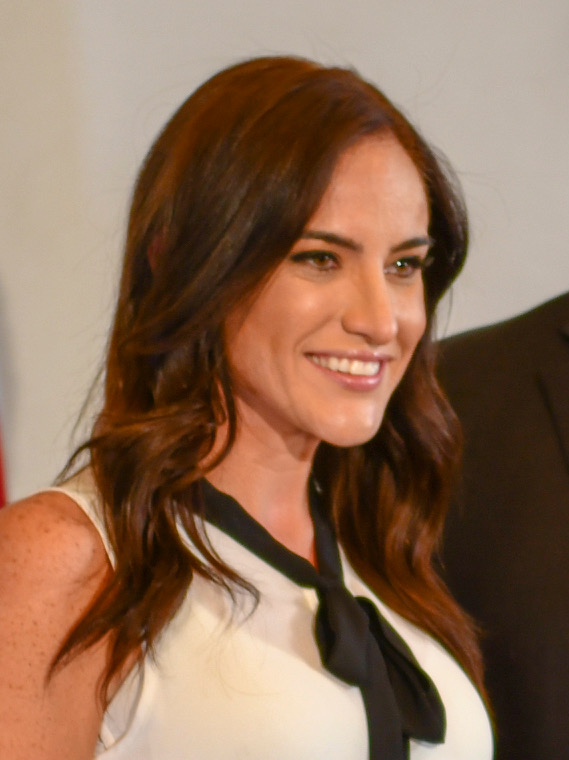
- Dithurbide in 2018
- Born: 1983 (age 42–43); Mexico City, Mexico
- Occupation: Journalist

Danielle Dithurbide (born 1983) is a Mexican journalist who works for Televisa. She currently hosts the Despierta con Danielle Dithurbide morning program on the company's flagship Las Estrellas network, having taken over the program in 2019.

== Biography ==
Dithurbide was born in Mexico City and studied history at the Universidad Iberoamericana. However, her passion for journalism had started in high school, after she watched news coverage of the September 11 attacks on the United States. She then earned a diploma in radio and television from the School of Journalism and Art for Radio and Television (PART). From 2006 to 2010, she worked at TV Azteca, producing investigative reports and hosting news programs on Proyecto 40.

Dithurbide joined Televisa in 2010, soon joining the network's investigative unit. Several reports, including a 2011 story on sexual trafficking, a 2012 piece on mental health prisons and a 2014 item on the migration of children, were recipients of the National Journalism Award. In January 2016, Dithurbide was named the Director of International Information for Noticieros Televisa; that same year, she began hosting a morning newscast on FOROtv.

=== Frida Sofía scandal ===
In the wake of the earthquake on 19 September 2017, Dithurbide became caught up in a story that turned out to be fake at one of the epicenters of the story. At the collapsed Colegio Rébsamen elementary school, she reported that a child, Frida Sofía, was still alive in the rubble. Coverage centered for hours on the supposedly trapped child; Dithurbide reported that rescuers were "in contact" with her, giving her something to drink. It was later learned that there was nobody alive in the collapsed school; Dithurbide blamed an inaccurate report from Mexican Navy officials assisting in the rescue effort. As the story had gone viral on social media, Dithurbide came under heavy criticism for the false report.

=== Despierta ===
After Carlos Loret de Mola left Televisa television to do work exclusively on radio, Dithurbide was named his replacement on the Despierta morning program in September 2019. Dithurbide's selection meant that the majority of Televisa's news programs across its channels were hosted by women.
