= Gregorio Cárdenas Hernández =

Mexican serial killer

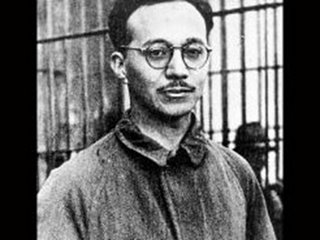
- Born: 1915; Mexico City, Mexico
- Died: August 2, 1999 (aged 83–84); Los Angeles, California, United States
- Other names: "The Tacuba Strangler" "Goyo"
- Conviction: Murder
- Penalty: Life imprisonment

Details
- Victims: 4
- Span of crimes: August – September 1942
- Country: Mexico
- Date apprehended: September 7, 1942

Gregorio "Goyo" Cárdenas Hernández (Latin American Spanish: [gɾeˈɣoɾjo ˈkaɾðenas eɾˈnandes]; Mexico City, 1915 – Los Angeles, 2 August 1999), also known as The Tacuba Strangler (estrangulador de Tacuba), was a Mexican serial killer. He was the first serial killer whose case was widely published in the Mexican media, and became a sensation on national media.

== Early life ==
Cárdenas Hernández was born in Mexico City to a family originating from the state of Veracruz. In part due to an encephalitis infection, he showed abnormal behavior as a child, including cruelty to animals. Cárdenas received a scholarship from Pemex to study chemistry at the Universidad Nacional Autónoma de México (UNAM).

He started visiting sex workers from age 15 and was concerned that constant bed-wetting would prevent a long-term relationship. However he met and married Sabina Lara Gonzalez around 1932. The marriage did not last. She told people about his bed-wetting and he lost respect for women generally.

== Murders ==
Cárdenas Hernández committed his murders in August and September 1942.

On 15 August 1942 he was visited in his house in the Tacuba neighborhood of Mexico City by 16-year-old prostitute María de los Ángeles González. After having sex with her, Cárdenas strangled De los Ángeles and buried her body in his garden. In the following weeks he also murdered prostitutes Rosa Reyes and Raquel Martínez de León, both aged 16, and finally 19-year-old fellow chemistry student Graciela Arias Ávalos. His neighbors started to get suspicious and informed the police. Shortly before the police exhumed the bodies, Cárdenas had himself committed to a psychiatric hospital, where he was arrested on 7 September 1942.

Cárdenas was incarcerated in the notorious Lecumberri prison. During his trial Cárdenas pleaded guilty and was given a life sentence. He escaped prison in 1947 and fled to Oaxaca, but eventually was rearrested.

== Fame ==
Cárdenas became a celebrity in Mexico, being the first multiple murderer receiving widespread media attention in that country. In the years following his murders there were reports of several copycat murderers imitating his crimes and an (illegal) pornographic movie based on his story was made. Cárdenas himself wrote three books while in prison and was regularly questioned and investigated by the country's top psychiatrists and criminologists. Cárdenas was allowed to pursue psychiatry and law studies while in prison. He learned to play the piano, wrote poetry, and even married in prison. His wife bore him four children.

In 1976 Cárdenas was pardoned by president Luis Echeverría. He was invited by interior secretary Mario Moya Palencia to give a speech in the Congress of the Union, where he was celebrated as a hero. He was hailed as a "great example" and a "clear case of rehabilitation". Cárdenas completed his law studies and worked as a lawyer until his death in 1999.

== In popular culture ==
A chance meeting with Alejandro Jodorowsky in a backstreet bar in Mexico City inspired the filmmaker to create the 1989 film Santa Sangre, based loosely on Cárdenas's life.

Cárdenas is portrayed by Bruno Bichir in the Apple TV+ crime drama Women in Blue (Las Azules), set in Mexico City in 1971. The series depicts him as a Lecumberri inmate who has studied law in prison, whose insight helps members of the city's first women's police corps understand the mind of the fictional serial killer they are hunting.

== See also ==
- List of serial killers by country
