= Backyard (film) =

- Film poster
- Spanish: El traspatio
- Directed by: Carlos Carrera
- Written by: Sabina Berman
- Starring: Ana de la Reguera; Marco Pérez
- Distributed by: Paramount Pictures
- Release date: 20 February 2009
- Running time: 122 minutes
- Country: Mexico
- Language: Spanish

Backyard (Spanish: El traspatio) is a 2009 Mexican crime film directed by Carlos Carrera. The film was selected as the Mexican entry for the Best Foreign Language Film at the 82nd Academy Awards, but it did not make the final shortlist.

== Plot ==
Officer Blanca Bravo (Ana de la Reguera) arrives in Ciudad Juárez, Chihuahua, to investigate a sequence of killings targeting female migrant workers. But with no help from the locals, bringing the responsible parties to justice becomes a frustrating exercise. As Bravo rails against indifference and local corruption, she finds herself on a collision course with Mickey Santos (Jimmy Smits), a Mexican mogul with a taste for young prostitutes.

== Cast ==
- Ana de la Reguera as Blanca
- Marco Pérez as Fierro
- Asur Zagada as Juana Sanchez
- Ivan Cortes as Cutberto
- Joaquín Cosío as Peralta
- Alejandro Calva as Comandante
- Jimmy Smits as Mickey Santos
- Carolina Politi as Sara
- Amorita Rasgado as Márgara
- Enoc Leaño as Gobernador
- Adriana Paz as Hilda
- Lisa Owen as Silvia
- Sayed Badreya as El Sultán
- Juan Carlos Barreto as Alvarez

== See also ==
- List of submissions to the 82nd Academy Awards for Best Foreign Language Film
- List of Mexican submissions for the Academy Award for Best Foreign Language Film
- Femicide in Ciudad Juárez
