= I Can See Your Voice (South Korean game show) season 2 =

Television game show season

I Can See Your Voice
- Season 2
- Starring: Han Hee-jun; Kim Sang-hyuk (Click-B); Ben; Lee Sang-min; Park Hwi-soon
- Hosted by: Kim Bum-soo; Leeteuk (Super Junior); Yoo Se-yoon
- Winners: Good singers: 6; Bad singers: 8
- No. of episodes: 14

Release
- Original network: Mnet; tvN
- Original release: October 22, 2015 – January 21, 2016

Season chronology
- ← Previous; Season 1 Next → Season 3

The second season of the South Korean television mystery music game show I Can See Your Voice premiered on Mnet and tvN on October 22, 2015.

== Gameplay ==
=== Format ===
For its game phase, the guest artist(s) must attempt to eliminate bad singers after each round. At the end of a game, the last remaining mystery singer is revealed as either good or bad by means of a duet between them and one of the guest artists. (Note: Gameplay note: The number of mystery singers are set to seven (for the rest of episodes) or eight (ep. 1).)

If the last remaining mystery singer is good, they are granted to release a digital single; if a singer is bad, they win ₩5,000,000.

=== Rounds ===
1. Visual round
  The guest artist is given some time to observe and examine each mystery singer based on their appearance. Afterward, a muted video of each mystery singer that reveals only 0.3 seconds of their singing voice is played as an additional hint.
2. Lip sync round
  Each mystery singer performs a lip sync to a song; good singers mime to a recording of their own, while bad singers mime to a backing track by another vocalist.
3. Evidence round
  A proof of each mystery singer's singing ability (i.e. photo, video, certificates, etc.) is shown on the screen. Good singers have own evidences, while bad singers have their evidences fabricated.

== Episodes ==
=== Guest artists ===
Legend:
Good singer
Bad singer

2015 games
Episode		Guest artist (Note: Players' notes: For the returning guest artists (who also include foreigners and former good singers), names are displayed in italics.; For the mixed groups, names who identified as bad singers are displayed in italics.)	Mystery singers (In their respective numbers and aliases)							
#	Date	Guest artist	Elimination order							Winner
#	Date	Guest artist	Visual round			Lip sync round		Evidence round		Winner
1	October 22, 2015	Shin Seung-hun	1. Jung Ji-woo	8. Oh Se-jong	6. Park Ji-hyuk	4. Kim Min-seok	3. Lee So-dam	5. Kim Cheong-il	2. Lee Young-hoon	7. Choi Seon-ah
2	October 29, 2015	Im Chang-jung	1. Shin Seo-woo	5. Choi Noo-ri	6. Lee Sang-hoon		7. Jung Hye-won	4. (United States) Joel	2. Heo Young-hyun	3. Han Yeo-wool
3	November 5, 2015	Insooni	4. Jo Young-myung	1. Hong Eui-seon	7. Kim Young-hoo		2. Kim Ye-seul	6. Ryu Moo-hyung	5. Han Soo-ji	3. Jo Joon-beom
4	November 12, 2015	K.Will	7. Kim Gyu-rim	2. Park Soo-ho	3. Chu Hwa-jeong		4. Shin Hyun-woo	5. Shin Min-gyu	6. Lee Seung-gyu	1. Kim Dong-ha
5	November 19, 2015	Dynamic Duo	1. Lee Il-song	6. Jo Ha-yool	3. Kim Ki-tae		7. Moon Sung-joon	4. Cha Min-soo	2. Kim Ja-young	5. Jung Goo-han
6	November 26, 2015	Hwanhee	2. Choi Hyung-gwan	7. Seo Jeong-hyun	1. Kwon Hyuk-joon		4. Jang Byung-hoon	3. Lee Soo-jeong	5. Kim Gwan-ho	6. Kim Hye-jeong
7	December 3, 2015	Johan Kim	1. Shin Jae-won	4. Song Min-gon	2. Park Won-Il		3. Goo Hye-yeon	6. Kim Yong-jin	7. Shin Joo-ro	5. Jung Hyun-wook
8	December 10, 2015	Brown Eyed Girls	4. Lee Geon	1. Park Jin-young	2. Yoo Kyung-mo		6. Kim Hwa-young	3. Oh Da-hyun	5. Moon Soo-jin	7. Lee Ga-ram
9	December 17, 2015	Wheesung	2. Jo Min-jae	4. Park Jun-young	6. Son Woong		5. Park Eui-chan	7. Lee Dae-hyuk	3. Park Sol-yi	1. Im Dong-woo
10	December 24, 2015	Gummy	3. Kim Yoo-ri	6. Yoon Yi-na	4. Park Hyun-sung		5. Park Chang-soo	1. Im Hoo-jeong	7. Lee Yoon-ah	2. Park Sung-rok
11	December 31, 2015	Jo Sung-mo and the Aproband (Note: Season highlights: In 11th episode, Aproband was initially assigned as guest panelists before they assisted with Jo Sung-mo for a duet performance.)	7. Yoon Gi-hoon	5. Chae Bo-hun	3. Park Min-goo		4. Park Yoo-jin	1. Seol Ha-yoon	6. Lee Gyu-ra	2. Yoo Byung-do

2016 games
Episode		Guest	Mystery singers (In their respective numbers and aliases)						
#	Date	Guest	Elimination order						Winner
#	Date	Guest	Visual round		Lip sync round		Evidence round		Winner
12	January 7, 2016	Shin Hye-sung	1. Kim Yoon-bae	7. Jung Hyun-wook	3. Lee Seung-hwan	2. Lee Won-mi	4. Hong Isaac	6. Lee Ye-eun	5. Oh Doo-seok
13	January 14, 2016	Yoon Jong-shin	5. Lee Seung-gyu	7. Lee Tae-hyung	1. Min Dong-sung	3. Kim Sung-bae	2. Park Da-hye	4. Park Jae-hyung	6. Hwang Seok-bin
14	January 21, 2016	Lee Jae-hoon	1. Min Dae-hong	2. Kim Seon-woo	6. Kim Joo-young	5. Jeon Sang-geun	7. Lee Sang-ho	4. Park Min-young	3. Lee Won-tam

=== Panelists ===
Legend:
Regular panelist
Additional panelist
Guest panelist

Apps		Panelists in attendance (Sorted by first appearance, with episode designations)
g#	p#	Panelists in attendance (Sorted by first appearance, with episode designations)
13	2	Kim Sang-hyuk (Click B) and Lee Sang-min (1–12, 14)
11	1	Park Hwi-soon (3–10, 12–14)
10	1	Han Hee-jun (1–2, 4–10, 14)
7	1	Ben (2, 4–5, 7–9, 11)
5	1	Jang Do-yeon (1–2, 6, 8, 10)
4	2	Shinsadong Tiger (5–8); Kim Ji-min (7, 11–13)
3	2	Gong Seo-young (3, 6, 9); Jang Su-won (11–13)
2	9	Julian Quintart (Note: Panelists' note: Foreign attendee: Julian Quintart (BEL)) and Yoon Sung-ho (1–2); Jang Dong-min (1, 13); Yulhee (Laboum) (2, 5); Ahn Hye-kyung (4, 8); Kim Hyo-jin (4, 13); Kim Na-young (11, 13); Choi Hee (7, 10); Kim Il-joong (12, 14)
1	21	Seo Yu-ri (1); Kim Sae-rom and Yoo Sang-moo (2); Chunji (Teen Top), Jeong Ga-eun, and Park Na-rae (3); Hong Hyun Hee and Kisum (5); U Sung-eun (6); Kim Beom-soo (8); Hong Yoon-hwa and Shorry J (Mighty Mouth) (9); Son Seung-yeon (10); Aproband (Lee Gwi-nam, Moon Sang-seon, Noh Eun-jong, Park Joon-soo, and Seo Young-min) (11); Hong Jin-kyung and Brian Joo (Fly to the Sky) (12); Jo Jung-chi, Oh Hyun-min, and Yoon Tae-jin (13); Lee Ha-neul (DJ Doc) and Maeng Seung-ji (14)

== Reception ==
Legend:
Highest rated episode
Lowest rated episode

No.	Title	Air date	Timeslot (KST)	AGB Ratings			TNmS Ratings		
No.	Title	Air date	Timeslot (KST)	Mnet	tvN	Comb.	Mnet	tvN	Comb.
1	"Shin Seung-hun"	October 22, 2015	Thursday, 9:40 pm	0.624%	1.374%	1.998%	0.6%	1.2%	1.8%
2	"Im Chang-jung"	October 29, 2015	Thursday, 9:40 pm	0.608%	1.523%	2.131%	0.5%	1.9%	2.4%
3	"Insooni"	November 5, 2015	Thursday, 9:40 pm	0.717%	1.45%	2.167%	0.7%	1.3%	2%
4	"K.Will"	November 12, 2015	Thursday, 9:40 pm	0.728%	2.253%	2.981%	1.2%	2.1%	3.3%
5	"Dynamic Duo"	November 19, 2015	Thursday, 9:40 pm	0.862%	1.567%	2.429%	0.9%	1.5%	2.4%
6	"Hwanhee"	November 26, 2015	Thursday, 9:40 pm	0.4%	2.126%	2.526%	1.1%	1.9%	3%
7	"Johan Kim"	December 3, 2015	Thursday, 9:40 pm	0.471%	2.593%	3.064%	1.1%	2.1%	3.2%
8	"Brown Eyed Girls"	December 10, 2015	Thursday, 9:40 pm	0.58%	2.749%	3.329%	1.2%	2%	3.2%
9	"Wheesung"	December 17, 2015	Thursday, 9:40 pm	0.644%	2.653%	3.297%	0.8%	1.8%	2.6%
10	"Gummy"	December 24, 2015	Thursday, 9:40 pm	1.048%	2.27%	3.318%	0.9%	2%	2.9%
11	Jo Sung-mo and the Aproband"	December 31, 2015	Thursday, 9:40 pm	0.884%	2.245%	3.129%	0.7%	1.6%	2.3%
12	"Shin Hye-sung"	January 7, 2016	Thursday, 9:40 pm	1%	2.67%	3.67%	1.3%	2.2%	3.5%
13	"Yoon Jong-shin"	January 14, 2016	Thursday, 9:40 pm	1.268%	1.821%	3.089%	0.9%	2%	2.9%
14	"Lee Jae-hoon"	January 21, 2016	Thursday, 9:40 pm	0.632%	3.076%	3.708%	1.2%	1.8%	3%

Sources: Nielsen Media Research and TNmS
