= Women in Blue (TV series) =

2024 Mexican crime drama television series

- Promotional poster
- Original title: Las Azules
- Genre: Crime drama; Period drama
- Created by: Fernando Rovzar; Pablo Aramendi
- Starring: Bárbara Mori; Ximena Sariñana; Amorita Rasgado; Natalia Téllez; Miguel Rodarte; Leonardo Sbaraglia
- Country of origin: Mexico
- Original language: Spanish
- No. of seasons: 2
- No. of episodes: 18

Production
- Executive producers: Fernando Rovzar; Wendy Riss; Alejandro Lozano; Erica Sánchez Su; Billy Rovzar
- Production company: Lemon Studios

Original release
- Network: Apple TV+
- Release: July 31 – September 25, 2024
- Network: Apple TV
- Release: August 12 – September 30, 2026

Women in Blue (Spanish: Las Azules) is a Mexican crime drama television series created by Fernando Rovzar and Pablo Aramendi. Set in Mexico City in the early 1970s, the series follows four women who join the country's first female police corps while a serial killer stalks the capital. It stars Bárbara Mori, Ximena Sariñana, Amorita Rasgado and Natalia Téllez, with Miguel Rodarte and Leonardo Sbaraglia in supporting roles.

Produced by Lemon Studios, the series was Apple TV's first Spanish-language original series. The ten-episode first season premiered on July 31, 2024, and concluded on September 25, 2024. A second season of eight episodes was released weekly from August 12 to September 30, 2026.

The first season drew generally favourable reviews, with critics praising the period production design and the performances of the four leads while noting the conventionality of the mystery plotting.

== Premise ==
=== Season 1 ===
In 1971, the government of Mexico City creates a female police corps, publicly presented as a modernizing reform but conceived largely as a public relations exercise intended to distract from the authorities' failure to capture a serial killer known as the Tlalpan Undresser (el Encuerador de Tlalpan). Four recruits from very different backgrounds — a housewife, her younger sister, the daughter of a police officer, and a highly analytical loner — enter the corps and, denied any real investigative role, begin pursuing the case themselves.

=== Season 2 ===
The second season opens the day after the Corpus Christi massacre of June 1971, in which the paramilitary group Los Halcones attacked a student demonstration in Mexico City. María, now promoted to lieutenant, leads the Azules into the investigation of the death of a student activist. The inquiry implicates the police force itself and reaches back to the Tlatelolco massacre of 1968, in which soldiers fired on student protesters shortly before Mexico hosted the Olympic Games.

== Cast and characters ==
=== Main ===
- Bárbara Mori as María de la Torre
- Ximena Sariñana as Ángeles Cruz
- Amorita Rasgado as Gabina Herrera
- Natalia Téllez as Valentina Camacho
- Miguel Rodarte as Octavio Romandía
- Leonardo Sbaraglia as Alejandro de la Torre

=== Recurring ===
- Christian Tappan as Escobedo
- Horacio García Rojas as Gerardo
- Bruno Bichir as Goyo Cárdenas
- Albi De Abreu as Jacobo Zabludovsky
- Alejandro de la Madrid as Luis Echeverría
- Rosa María Bianchi as Luz
- Mario Zaragoza as Comandante Herrera
- Alejandro Guerrero as the Tlalpan Undresser

== Episodes ==
Season	Episodes	Originally released		
Season	Episodes	First released	Last released	Network
1	10	July 31, 2024	September 25, 2024	Apple TV+
2	8	August 12, 2026	September 30, 2026	Apple TV

=== Season 1 (2024) ===
Each episode of the first season is named for a female character.

No. overall	No. in season	Title	Directed by	Written by	Original release date
1	1	"María"	Fernando Rovzar	Fernando Rovzar	July 31, 2024
With a serial killer targeting women in the capital, María, Valentina, Gabina and Ángeles join the newly formed female police corps.
2	2	"Paola"	Fernando Rovzar	Fernando Rovzar	July 31, 2024
The recruits come upon a fresh victim of the Undresser and watch as a man they believe to be innocent is arrested.
3	3	"Norma"	Alfonso Pineda Ulloa	Fernando Rovzar	August 7, 2024
Dissatisfied with the detectives' conclusions, the Azules begin an unauthorized investigation of their own.
4	4	"Alma"	Alfonso Pineda Ulloa	Wendy Riss	August 14, 2024
Another victim is discovered, confirming the Azules' suspicions and directing the detectives towards a new suspect.
5	5	"Ángeles"	Carlos Moreno	Pablo Aramendi	August 21, 2024
Romandía is drawn into the investigation as the Azules uncover a clue that may reveal the killer's identity.
6	6	"Laura"	J.M. Cravioto; Fernando Rovzar	Wendy Riss	August 28, 2024
The detectives resort to drastic measures, while María seeks insight from a convicted serial killer.
7	7	"Dora"	José Manuel Cravioto	Silvia Jiménez	September 4, 2024
The Azules examine unsolved murders in search of a connection to the Undresser.
8	8	"Rosa"	Fernando Rovzar	Silvia Jiménez	September 11, 2024
María and Ángeles interview the adopted son of a woman the Azules believe may have been the killer's first victim.
9	9	"Gabina"	José Manuel Cravioto	Pablo Aramendi	September 18, 2024
The Azules and the detectives set a trap for their suspect, but the operation goes wrong.
10	10	"Valentina"	Fernando Rovzar	Fernando Rovzar	September 25, 2024
The Azules combine their resources to save one of their own, putting the future of the corps at risk.

=== Season 2 (2026) ===
No. overall	No. in season	Title	Directed by	Written by	Original release date
11	1	"Mauricio"	Fernando Rovzar	Fernando Rovzar	August 12, 2026
Newly promoted to lieutenant, María leads the Azules into the investigation of a murdered university student.
12	2	"Filiberto"	Fernando Rovzar	Pablo Aramendi	August 19, 2026
An unexpected clue links the first victim to a second, raising the possibility of targeted killings.
13	3	"Quintanilla"	Fernando Rovzar	Fernando Rovzar	August 26, 2026
Interviews with the surviving student activists suggest that one of them is withholding something.
14	4	"Arizmendi"	Humberto Hinojosa O	Fernando Rovzar; Lisa Carrión	September 2, 2026
The detectives believe they have identified the person killing corrupt officers; the Azules are unconvinced.
15	5	"Lozano"	Humberto Hinojosa O	Pablo Aramendi	September 9, 2026
Fear spreads through the department when another detective disappears.
16	6	"Gilberto"	Fernando Rovzar; Sara Seligman	Silvia Jiménez	September 16, 2026
Public hostility towards the police grows following the Executioner's latest killings.
17	7	"Gerardo"	Fernando Rovzar	Fernando Rovzar	September 23, 2026
An act of desperation threatens Gabina's friendship with Valentina.
18	8	"Goyo"	Fernando Rovzar	Fernando Rovzar; Silvia Jiménez; Pablo Aramendi	September 30, 2026
The Azules race to connect the evidence before the Executioner kills again.

== Production ==
=== Development ===
The series was created by Fernando Rovzar and Pablo Aramendi and produced by Lemon Studios for Apple TV+. Rovzar, an International Emmy Award winner for Monarca, serves as showrunner and director of some episodes. Executive producers alongside Rovzar include Wendy Riss, Alejandro Lozano, Erica Sánchez Su and Billy Rovzar.

Rovzar has described the intention as a gritty crime story inflected with traditional Mexican melodrama, aimed at exposing wrongdoing within the establishment. He said extensive research underpinned the depiction of the historical events, which the production sought to portray "with honesty, responsibility and respect".

=== Historical basis ===
The series is a fictionalization rather than a documentary account. Its premise draws on the creation of Mexico City's first female police corps in 1971, while the serial killer of the first season is invented. Several real figures appear as characters, including the journalist Jacobo Zabludovsky and the convicted murderer Goyo Cárdenas. The second season is built around two documented episodes of state repression: the Tlatelolco massacre of 1968 and the Corpus Christi massacre of June 1971.

Speaking about the second season, Mori said the investigation would "delve deeply into the subject, not just the institution of the police force itself, but also the 1971 student massacre", drawing a line to continuing killings and disappearances in Mexico.

=== Filming ===
Filming took place in Mexico, with production design reconstructing Mexico City of the early 1970s. Reviewers singled out the period recreation, cinematography and costuming as among the series' strengths.

== Release ==
Women in Blue premiered on Apple TV+ on July 31, 2024, with its first two episodes, followed by one episode weekly until the season finale on September 25, 2024.

Apple renewed the series for a second season in May 2025. In March 2026, Apple announced that the eight-episode season would premiere on August 12, 2026. A trailer was released on July 21, 2026. The second season streamed globally on Apple TV from August 12 to September 30, 2026, with one episode released weekly.

=== Future ===
At the premiere of the second season, Rovzar said he would welcome a third season and already had an idea for it, but that the decision depended on how audiences responded. As of the second-season finale on September 30, 2026, Apple had not announced whether the series would be renewed.

== Reception ==
On the review aggregator Rotten Tomatoes, the first season holds an approval rating of 100% based on 15 critic reviews. The website's consensus reads: "As a group of four women in 1970s Mexico battle sexism and a serial killer, this by-the-book crime drama delivers plenty of soapy twists to keep the thrills going." On Metacritic, the season has a weighted average score of 76 out of 100 based on six critics, indicating "generally favorable" reviews.

Reviewing the series for Variety, Aramide Tinubu wrote that it "succeeds not only because of its distinct characters and truly intriguing mystery, but also because it showcases how patriarchal ideals and misogyny harm not just women but society as a whole". Cristina Escobar of RogerEbert.com called it "a thrilling and satisfying ride, combining predictable genre elements with surprising turns", while faulting uneven direction and writing and observing that a series about women had been created, directed and largely written by men.

Writing in The Guardian, Rachel Aroesti was more reserved, finding the protagonists' transformation and the corruption of the police department "entertaining and thought-provoking" but lacking inherent dramatic tension, with the narrative drive resting instead on the killer's concealed identity. Dan Einav of the Financial Times awarded three stars out of five, judging that the series "largely plays out as you expect" but is "enriched by polished execution and fine lead performances".

== Accolades ==
Awards and nominations for Women in Blue
Year	Award	Category	Nominee(s)	Result	Ref.
2024	Hollywood Music in Media Awards	Score – Television Show/Limited Series (Foreign Language)	Lucas Vidal	Won	
2025	Rose d'Or Latinos	Drama Series	Women in Blue	Nominated	
2025	India Catalina Awards	Best Actor in an Ibero-American Fiction Series	Miguel Rodarte	Won	
2025	Premios Aura	Best Cast	Cast of Women in Blue	Won	
2025	Imagen Awards	Best Actress – Drama	Bárbara Mori	Nominated	
2025	Imagen Awards	Best Actress – Drama	Amorita Rasgado	Nominated	
2025	Imagen Awards	Best Music Composition for Film or Television	Lucas Vidal	Nominated	
2025	Imagen Awards	Best Music Supervision for Film or Television	Lynn Fainchtein	Nominated	
2025	International Emmy Awards	Best Drama Series	Women in Blue	Nominated	
