= La Crónica de Hoy =

Mexican newspaper

- Type: Newspaper
- Format: Tabloid
- Founded: 1996
- Language: Spanish
- Headquarters: Mexico City

La Crónica de Hoy is a Mexican newspaper published in Mexico City. The newspaper was launched in 1996 by its founder, Pablo Hiriart. La Crónica de Hoy has been directed by journalist Guillermo Ortega Ruiz since 2007.

== See also ==
- List of newspapers in Mexico
