= Artemisa Téllez =

Mexican writer (born 1979)

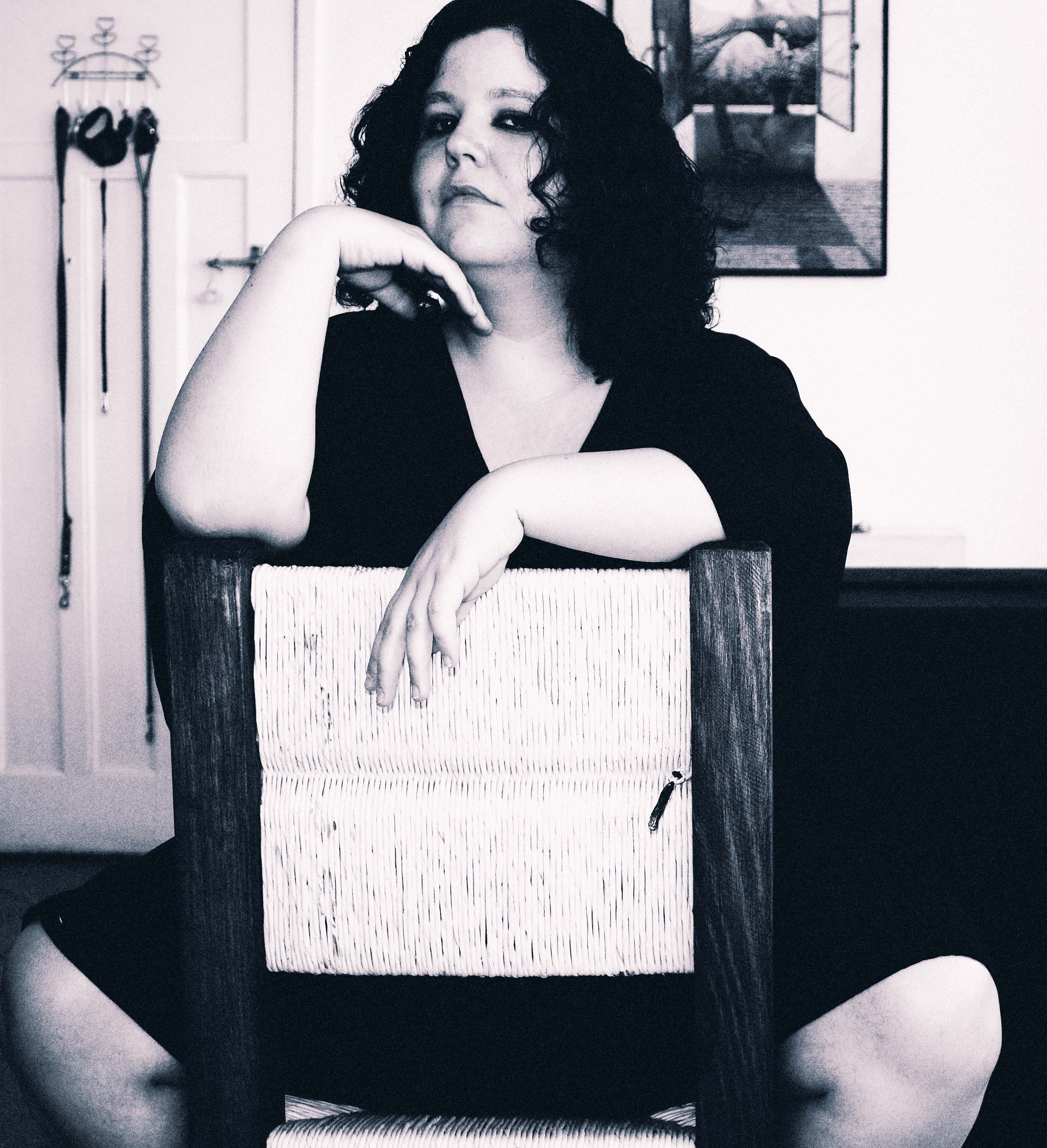
- Artemisa Téllez in 2012
- Born: August 24, 1979 (age 47); Mexico City
- Education: National Autonomous University of Mexico
- Occupation: Writer
- Father: Guillermo Téllez
- Relatives: Natalia Téllez

Artemisa Téllez (Mexico City, August 24, 1979) is a Mexican author. Her literary works have focused on exploring sapphism and sexual diversity, which has led to her being considered one of the most important representatives of Mexican lesbian literature.

As an instructor, she has offered courses on reading and writing literature that highlight Mexican writers and women's erotic stories.

== Literary career ==
Téllez's first work of poetry was published in 2010 with the title Cuerpo de mi soledad ("Body of my Solitude"). The poems deal with themes of love and erotic female relationships.

In 2014, she published the novel Crema de vanilla ("Vanilla Cream") with the publisher Voces en Tinta. It tells the story of a female university student who meets a woman named Lala, who she feels attracted to and with whom she begins a relationship. The novel caused a controversy after its publication concerning violence in relation to the protagonists, which is expressed in perverse sexual games that the characters play. However, academics like César Cañedo have noted that the novel can be read as a sapphic narrative and that its publication marks a key moment in the Mexican lesbian narrative.

Téllez's next work was the short story collection Fotografías instantáneas ("Instant Photographs"), published in 2016. Its main theme deals with love between women in Mexico City's lesbian underworld.

In the latter half of the 2010s, Téllez primarily focused on poetry. This period produced the poetry collections Cangrejo ("Crab," 2017), Larga herida ("A Lengthy Injury," 2018), Casa sin fin ("Endless House," 2018), and Mujeres de Cromagnon ("Cro-magnon Women," 2020).

== Works ==
=== Prose ===
- Crema de vainilla (2014), novel
- Fotografías instantáneas (2016), stories

=== Poetry ===
- Cuerpo de mi soledad (2010)
- Cangrejo (2017)
- Larga herida (2018)
- Casa sin fin (2018)
- Mujeres de Cromagnon (2020)

== See also ==
- LGBT literature in Mexico
- Lesbian erotica
