= Guillermo Ortega Ruiz =

Mexican journalist

- Born: February 15, 1955 (age 71); Mexico City, Mexico
- Occupation: Journalist
- Website: guillermoortega.com

Guillermo Ortega Ruiz (born February 15, 1955, in Mexico City) is a Mexican journalist. He was Televisa Nightly News Anchor.

== Biography ==
Son of Benjamin Ortega Hernandez also a journalist and Guillermina Ruiz Marcos. He studied journalism at the School of Journalism Carlos Septién Garcia.

=== Career ===
He began working for Televisa on June 16, 1976, at the age of 21, starting as a reporter at the News 24 Hours from 1976 to 1981. He participated as a correspondent in the Salvadoran Civil War. He Covered state visits of Presidents of Mexico to different parts of the world, from José López Portillo to Vicente Fox. He narrated the visits of the Pope John Paul II, Summer Olympic Games and Space Missions, as well as witnessed and reported unrest and conflicts in various countries and covered presidential campaigns.

As TV host he has been in the following shows:

- Televisa
  - 1978: 24 Horas - in substitution of Jacobo Zabludovsky
  - 1981-1984: En Contacto Directo - Host and Director - Channel 5
  - 1984-1986: Notivisa - Host and Director - Canal 5
  - 1987-1988: Hoy Mismo - Host - Channel 2
  - 1988-1998: Eco - Host - vía satellite to all the Americas and Europe
  - 1992-1998: Al Despertar - Host and Director - Channel 2
  - 1998-2000: El Noticiero con Guillermo Ortega - Channel 2
  - 1999-2000: En la Radio - XEQ
- MVS Comunicaciones
  - 2000-2003 MVS Noticias - MVS Radio

From 1998 to 2000 he was anchor of the nightly news emission in "El Canal de las Estrellas" (Channel 2) of Televisa, entitled El Noticiero with Guillermo Ortega, in place of 24 hours, with Jacobo Zabludovsky. In 2000 he left Televisa and was replaced with Joaquín López-Dóriga.

In 2001 he became the newspaper's editorial columnist of La Crónica de Hoy. In 2007 he was appointed General Director of the newspaper.

Media offices
Preceded by Jacobo Zabludovsky	Televisa Nightly News Anchor; January 19, 1998 – April 3, 2000	Succeeded by Joaquín López-Dóriga
