= Noticias ECO =

Mexican news channel

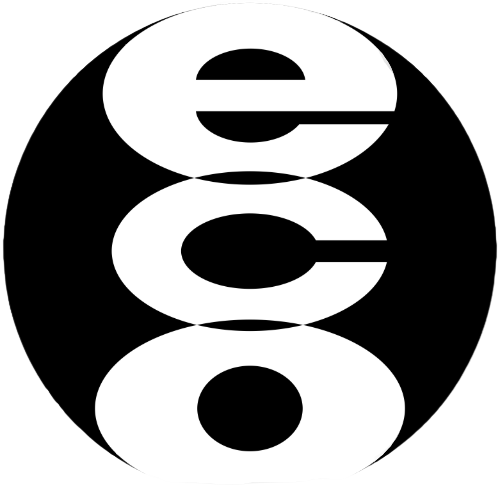
Noticias ECO Logo of 1988 to 2001.

Noticias ECO Logo of 1994 to 1997.

Noticias ECO (Empresa de Comunicaciones Orbitales, S.A. de C.V., lit. Orbital Communications Company), also known as ECO News, was a Mexican news channel, which broadcast from 1 September 1988 to 1 May 2001. It was the first 24-hour news channel in Spanish and was owned by Televisa. It closed due to low profits.

Its signal covered the Americas, Europe and Northern Africa via satellite, with correspondents in 32 countries. Some of the other Televisa networks, such as Galavisión and Canal de las Estrellas, included or simulcast ECO newscasts.

In 2010, Canal de la Ciudad, which had been airing programs targeted toward Mexico City, was relaunched as FOROtv with a full slate of news and opinion programs. This marks the first time since ECO's closure that Televisa has operated a mainly-news channel.
