= I Can See Your Voice (South Korean game show) season 1 =

Television game show season

I Can See Your Voice
- Season 1
- Starring: Hwang Chi-yeul; Kim Sang-hyuk (Click-B); Ben; Julian Quintart; Yoon Sung-ho
- Hosted by: Kim Bum-soo; Leeteuk (Super Junior); Yoo Se-yoon
- Winners: Good singers: 4; Bad singers: 7
- No. of episodes: Regular: 11; Special: 1; Overall: 12

Release
- Original network: Mnet; tvN
- Original release: February 26 – May 14, 2015

Season chronology
- Next → Season 2

The first season of the South Korean television mystery music game show I Can See Your Voice premiered on Mnet and tvN on February 26, 2015.

== Gameplay ==
=== Format ===
For its game phase, the guest artist(s) must attempt to eliminate bad singers after each round. At the end of a game, the last remaining mystery singer is revealed as either good or bad by means of a duet between them and one of the guest artists. (Note: Gameplay notes: The number of mystery singers are set to seven (for the rest of episodes), eight (eps. 2–3), or nine (its original count, from the debut).; Through 4 rounds, the introduction portion was initially used for the first 2 episodes, before it was replaced by an evidential one for the rest of the season.)

If the last remaining mystery singer is good, they are granted to release a digital single; if a singer is bad, they win ₩5,000,000.

=== Rounds ===
1. Visual round
  The guest artist is given some time to observe and examine each mystery singer based on their appearance. Afterward, a muted video of each mystery singer that reveals only 0.3 seconds of their singing voice is played as an additional hint.
2. Introduction round
  Each mystery singer self-introduces to guest artist and panelists. Good singers are telling the truth, while bad singers are allowed to lie.
3. Lip sync round
  Each mystery singer performs a lip sync to a song; good singers mime to a recording of their own, while bad singers mime to a backing track by another vocalist.
4. 1. Interrogation round
  The guest artist may ask questions to the remaining mystery singers. Good singers are required to give truthful responses, while the bad singers must lie.
4. 2. Evidence round
  A proof of each mystery singer's singing ability (i.e. photo, video, certificates, etc.) is shown on the screen. Good singers have own evidences, while bad singers had their evidences fabricated.

== Episodes ==
=== Guest artists ===
Legend:
Good singer
Bad singer

Episode		Guest artist (Note: Players' notes: For the returning guest artists (who also include foreigners and former good singers), names are displayed in italics.; For the mixed groups, names who identified as bad singers are displayed in italics.)	Mystery singers (In their respective numbers and aliases)								
#	Date	Guest artist	Elimination order								Winner
#	Date	Guest artist	Visual round		Introduction round		Lip sync round		Interrogation round		Winner
1	February 26, 2015	Kim Bum-soo (Note: Season highlights: Host Kim Bum-soo demonstrated the game as a guest artist, with experts Cho Dong-wook (on voice analysis) and Kim Min-jeong (on face reading) as guest panelists.; During its Star Wars special, when the 3rd round initially scored 74–26 in favor of good singer Jung Hyun-mo (from Gold Stars), bad singer Park Ji-eun (from Black Stars) countered it by performing two songs, resulting in an upset victory and her score doubled to 52 points.)	2. Park Min-seo	4 Kim In-seop	6. Kang Byung-gon	3. Park Joon-im	9. Im Ba-wool	1. Lee Seon-ah	5. Kim Sung-gon	7. Im Je-jin	8. Park Ji-eun
2	March 5, 2015	Lena Park	3. Kim Eun-bi		6. Lee Ye-dam	7. Bang Se-jin	4. Lee Sung-min	5. Lee Myung-jin	1. Hwang Chi-yeul	8. Choi Beom-yeol	2. Cha Geon-jae
#	Date	Guest artist	Elimination order								Winner
#	Date	Guest artist	Visual round			Lip sync round			Evidence round		Winner
3	March 12, 2015	Yoon Min-soo	1. (Ivory Coast) Amon Martin	3. Park Cheol-hoon	2. Yeon Ji-eun	6. Yang Sung-hoon		5. Bang Sung-woo	7. Ha Jeong-hyun	8. Kim Ha-yi	4. Park Ho-yong
4	March 19, 2015	Kim Tae-woo	5. Yoon Young-shin	6. Seo Sang-hyun		1. Im Hae-chang		2. Kang Yi-seul	3. Jo Sung-beom	4. Na Tae-ju	7. Kim Dong-gyun
5	March 26, 2015	Baek Ji-young	2. Song Woo-seok	6. Park Won-jong		4. Kim Gi-wook		5. Park Sung-yoon	1. Oh Young-joo	7. Lee Jin-hee	3. Im Dong-hyuk
6	April 2, 2015	Kim Yeon-woo	4. Kang Min	5. Lee Yong-moon		1. Jang Ji-gwang		7. Jung Hyun-mo	6. Park Se-joon	3. Go Seung-hyung	2. Lee Seul-gi
7	April 9, 2015	2AM	4. Park Jeong-joon	1. Jo Byung-joon		5. Heo Yoon		6. Lee Jin-hwang	3. Hwang Woo-lim	7. Jung Hyun-woong	2. Kim Yoo-rim
8	April 16, 2015	Jang Yun-jeong	1. Kwon Joon-yeon	6. Won Ji-hye		4. Kim Young-cheol		7. Lee Jae-hyuk	3. Jung Jin-myung and Jung Jin-wook	5. Ahn Je-hyun	2. Lee Ah-hyun
9	April 23, 2015	Noel	3. Lee Seung-hee	4. Hong Seok-joon		6. Kim Ki-yeol		7. Seo Min-cheol	1. Ah Yeon	2. Kwon Min-je	5. Lydia Ahn
10	April 30, 2015	DJ Doc	4. Hong Ji-myung	1. Kim Ha-eun		3. Kim Seong-ri		6. Kim Ga-yeon	2. Yeon Ji-hoon	7. Lee An	5. Park Min-gi
11	May 7, 2015	Ailee	1. Kwon Mi-hee	2. Mok Young-soo		3. Kim So-hee		5. Kim Jeong-won	4. Kim Sung-ho	7. Go Gwang-wook	6. Kim Min-seon

=== Panelists ===
Legend:
Regular panelist
Additional panelist
Guest panelist

Apps		Panelists in attendance (Sorted by first appearance, with episode designations)
g#	p#	Panelists in attendance (Sorted by first appearance, with episode designations)
11	2	Kim Sang-hyuk (Click-B) and Julian Quintart (Note: Panelists' note: Foreign attendee: Julian Quintart (BEL))(1–11)
8	1	Yoon Sung-ho (2–4, 7–11)
5	2	Ben (3, 6, 8–10); Hwang Chi-yeul (6–10)
4	1	Ahn Young-mi (1–4)
3	1	Jang Dong-min (5–6, 11)
2	7	Bae Ji-hyun and Ilhoon (BtoB) (5, 11); Jeong Ga-eun, Lee Yeon-doo, and Yoo Sang-moo (6–7); James (Royal Pirates) and Kim Na-young (8–9)
1	19	Cho Dong-wook, Kang Yong-suk, Jaekyung (Rainbow), and Kim Min-jeong (1); Hyunyoung (Rainbow) (2); Choi Gook, Minwoo (ZE:A), and Shin A-young (3); Heechul (ZE:A) (4); Lee Sang-joon, Lee Young-jin, and Song Yuvin (5); Eddy Kim (6); MIIII (7); Hwang Hyun-hee (8); Hong Kyung-joon and Yang Sang-guk (9); Kim In-seok, Lee Guk-joo, and Son Seung-yeon (10); Hyun Young (11)

== Star Wars (May 14, 2015) ==
Ten reinvited mystery singers are divided into two teams of five (with each of are being represented by four good singers and one bad singer). For each round, both of team's panelists would have to pick their mystery singers for a "showdown". Afterward, the voting is done through audience majority, and are accumulated for the winning team.

Team	Black Stars		vs.	Gold Stars	
Panelists	Yoo Se-yoon (leader), Ben, Julian Quintart, Shin A-young, and Yoo Sang-moo		322–310	Kim Bum-soo (leader), Jaekyung (of Rainbow), Eddy Kim, Kim Sang-hyuk, and Yoon Sung-ho	
Round	Mystery singer	Song	Score	Mystery singer	Song
1	Bang Se-jin (ep. 2)	"Wish" (소원) — Kim Sung-hyun	43–57	Go Seung-hyung (ep. 6)	"Snow Flower" (눈의 꽃) — Park Hyo-shin
2	Hwang Chi-yeul (ep. 2)	"The Flight" (비상) — Yim Jae-beom	71–29	Jung Jin-myung and Jung Jin-wook (ep. 8)	"8282" — Davichi
3	Park Ji-eun (ep. 1, winner)	"Caution" (경고) — Tashannie and "Tears" — So Chan-whee	52–48	Jung Hyun-mo (ep. 6)	"Billie Jean" — Michael Jackson
Lip sync	Yoo Se-yoon	"I Won't Love" (사랑 안 해) — Baek Ji-young	0–80	Kim Bum-soo	"Memory of the Wind" (바람기억) — Naul
4	Kwon Min-je (ep. 9)	"Memory of the Wind" (바람기억) — Naul	32–68	Bang Sung-woo (ep. 3)	"You in the Same Time" (같은 시간 속의 너) — Naul
5	Lee Jin-hee (ep. 5)	"Only I Didn't Know" (나만 몰랐던 이야기) — IU	72–28	Cha Geon-jae (ep. 2, winner)	"Wind, Please Stop Blowing" (바람아 멈추어다오) — Lee Ji-yeon

== Reception ==
Legend:
Highest rated episode
Lowest rated episode

No.	Title	Air date	Timeslot (KST)	AGB Ratings			TNmS Ratings		
No.	Title	Air date	Timeslot (KST)	Mnet	tvN	Comb.	Mnet	tvN	Comb.
1	"Kim Bum-soo"	February 26, 2015	Thursday, 9:40 pm	0.3%	1.613%	1.913%	0.7%	1.3%	2%
2	"Lena Park"	March 5, 2015	Thursday, 9:40 pm	0.2%	1.39%	1.59%	0.7%	1%	1.7%
3	"Yoon Min-soo"	March 12, 2015	Thursday, 9:40 pm	0.568%	1.551%	2.119%	0.6%	1%	1.6%
4	"Kim Tae-wook"	March 19, 2015	Thursday, 9:40 pm	0.52%	1.155%	1.675%	0.8%	0.8%	1.6%
5	"Baek Ji-young"	March 26, 2015	Thursday, 9:40 pm	0.6%	1.298%	1.898%	1.1%	1.4%	2.5%
6	"Kim Yeon-woo"	April 2, 2015	Thursday, 9:40 pm	0.647%	1.334%	1.981%	0.7%	1.3%	2%
7	"2AM"	April 9, 2015	Thursday, 9:40 pm	0.4%	1.523%	1.923%	0.8%	1.2%	2%
8	"Jang Yun-jeong"	April 16, 2015	Thursday, 9:40 pm	0.513%	1.972%	2.485%	0.9%	1.4%	2.3%
9	"Noel"	April 23, 2015	Thursday, 9:40 pm	0.4%	1.392%	1.792%	1.1%	1.4%	2.5%
10	"DJ Doc"	April 30, 2015	Thursday, 9:40 pm	0.589%	1.5%	2.089%	0.8%	1.8%	2.6%
11	"Ailee"	May 7, 2015	Thursday, 9:40 pm	0.538%	1.516%	2.054%	0.6%	1.3%	1.9%
Special	"Star Wars"	May 14, 2015	Thursday, 9:40 pm	0.529%	0.9%	1.429%	0.9%	1.1%	2%

Sources: Nielsen Media Research and TNmS
