= Abraham Zabludovsky =

Mexican architect (1924–2003)

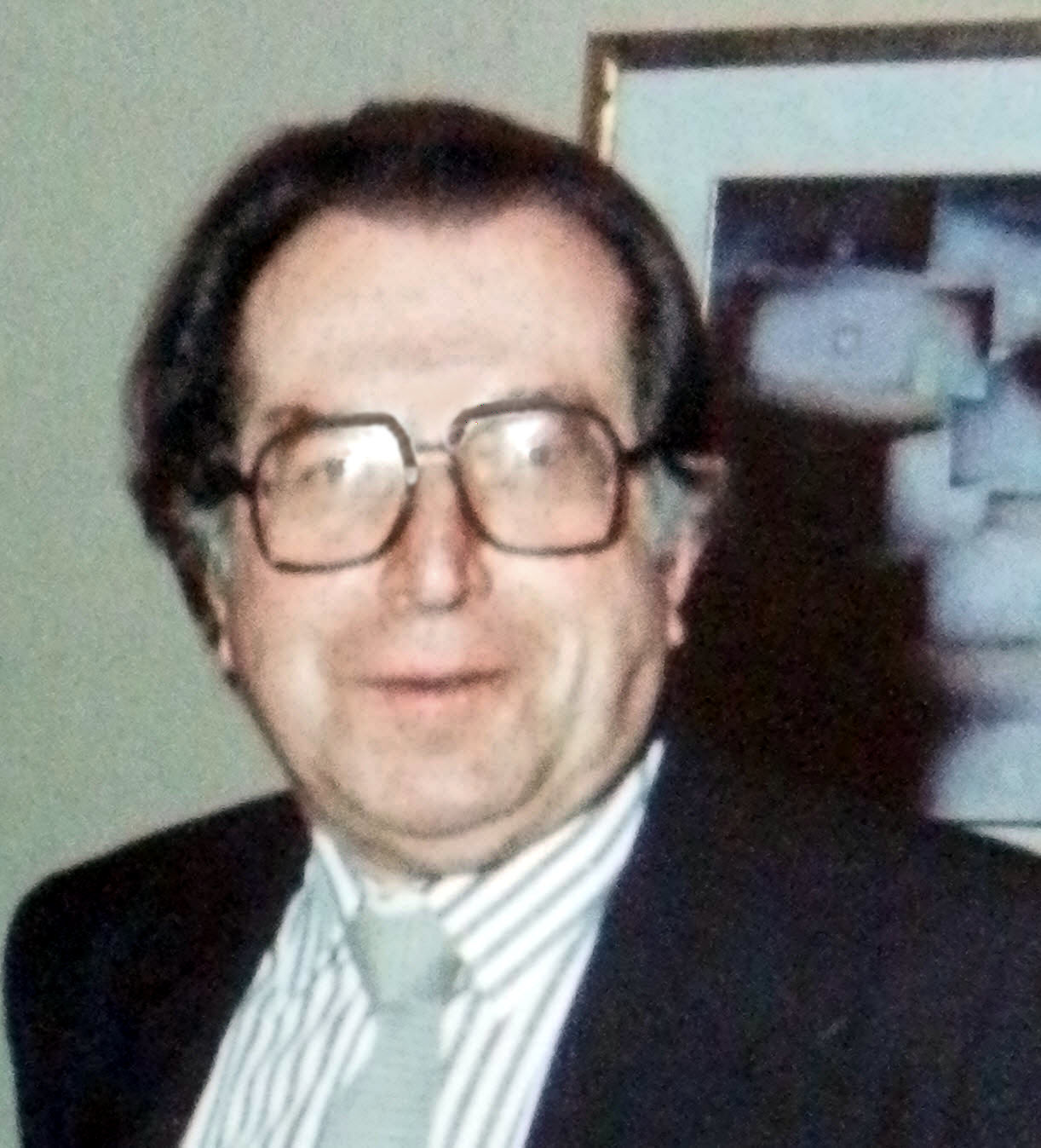
Abraham Zabludovsky Kraveski

Abraham Zabludovsky (born Abraham Zabludowski Kraveski; June 14, 1924 – April 9, 2003) was a Mexican architect. He was the brother of the well known journalist Jacobo Zabludovsky.

Abraham Zabludovsky was born in Białystok, Poland. He studied at the Universidad Nacional Autónoma de México, graduating in 1949. In his early years he produced a large number of outstanding residential buildings and offices in Mexico City, making rigorous use of the International style and demonstrating an impeccable handling of contemporary design, techniques and materials. Also notable from this period was the Centro Cívico Cinco de Mayo (1962), Puebla, on which he collaborated with Guillermo Rossell.

In 1968 Zabludovsky began working in collaboration with Teodoro González de León, although the two architects continued to work on some projects individually and retained their separate stylistic identities. Their collaborative work was remarkable for its quality and maturity, establishing functional and formal solutions that were later widely imitated. Clear examples of their characteristic proposals for constructions of massive, linear volume are the Delegación Cuauhtémoc (1972–3; with Jaime Ortiz Monasterio (b 1928) and Luis Antonio Zapiain (b 1942)), the headquarters of INFONAVIT (Instituto del Fondo Nacional de la Vivienda para los Trabajadores, completed 1975) and the new building for the Colegio de México (1974–5; see MEXICO, fig. 7), all in Mexico City.

Zabludovsky also carried out a number of works individually in the same style. Outstanding among these was the Centro Cultural Emilio O. Rabasa (1983), Tuxtla Gutiérrez, Chiapas, a construction with sculptural aspects that manages faithfully to fulfil the need for both theatricality and diffusion. He also designed two multipurpose auditoriums in Celaya and Dolores Hidalgo, Guanajuato (1990), two theatres in Guanajuato, Guanajuato, and Aguascalientes, Aguascalientes (1991), and a convention centre in Tuxtla Gutiérrez, Chiapas (1994).

He died of a heart attack in Mexico City on April 9, 2003, aged 78.

== Awards ==
- Professor Emeritus of the Mexican National Academy of Architecture
- Honorary member of The American Institute of Architects
- Professor Emeritus of the International Academy of Architecture in Sofia, Bulgaria
- Gold Medal at the International Architecture Biennial in Sofia, Bulgaria
- Latin American Grand Prix at the Buenos Aires Biennial
- Honorary mention at the Third International Architecture Biennial in Brazil
- VITRUVIO Award for outstanding achievements in the creation and fomenting of culture
