= Denise Maerker =

Mexican journalist and TV news anchor

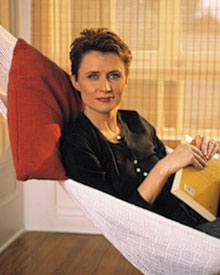
- Born: January 8, 1965 (age 60); Mexico City, Mexico
- Occupation: Journalist

Denise Maerker Salmón (born January 8, 1965, in Mexico City, Mexico) is a Mexican journalist who anchored the flagship En punto, the nightly newscast for Televisa from 2016 to 2023, and has served on the company's Board of Directors since April 2022.

She studied economics and social science at the University of Louvain (UCLouvain) in Belgium. She earned a master in political science, and PhD in comparative political systems at the Sorbonne in Paris.

After returning to Mexico, Maerker was a research professor and director of communication at the Centro de Investigación y Docencia Económicas (CIDE). She entered into the world of journalism in 1997, appearing alongside Ciro Gómez Leyva on CNI Canal 40, who is now a competitor on Imagen Televisión.

After the departure of Joaquín López-Dóriga from the nightly news on Las Estrellas, Televisa announced on May 30, 2016, that Maerker would be his replacement beginning on August 22. Prior to hosting the nightly newscast, she had been a panelist on the Televisa discussion program Tercer Grado and hosted the Punto de Partida program. Maerker was subsequently appointed to the Board of Directors of Grupo Televisa on April 5, 2022.

Alongside her roles as anchorwoman and board member of Televisa, Maerker is a columnist for the El Universal newspaper and hosts a radio program on Radio Fórmula.

Media offices
Preceded by Joaquín López-Dóriga	Televisa Nightly News Anchor; August 22, 2016 – January 10, 2023	Succeeded by Enrique Acevedo
