= An Unknown Enemy =

Television series

An Unknown Enemy (Spanish: Un Extraño Enemigo) is a 2018 television historical political thriller and drama series released on Amazon Prime.

It examines the events leading to the 1968 student massacre and its cover-up, through the eyes of Commander Fernando Barrientos, head of a secret Intelligence agency.

The series main character is loosely based on the real life Fernando Gutiérrez Barrios, director of the infamous DFS intelligence Agency, and depicts the political intrigues that triggered the period of censorship and repression of students at the end of the 1960s.

Season 1, comprising eight episodes, aired on Amazon Prime exclusively. It premiered on October 2, 2018, commemorating 50 years of the depicted events. On November 9, 2018, it was announced that the series would be renewed for a second season which premiered on September 28, 2022. This season its losely based on Corpus Christi Massacre and subsequently guerrilla groups 3 years after the events of the first season.

== Premise ==
=== Season 1 ===
An Unknown Enemy explores the origins of the Mexican dirty war of the 1960s, and portrays the attempts of Fernando Barrientos, head of the "NSD" secret police, to ensure a grip on political power, as the country goes through a series of social turmoils, in part provoked by the agency he is directing. All happening in the frame of the Cold War, the 1960s youth counterculture, the preparations of 1968 Olympic Games in Mexico and the upcoming 1970 Mexican general election.

=== Season 2 ===
The second season covers the aftermath of movement, el halconazo, the guerrilla groups and barrientos return on the power.

== Reception ==
The series received mostly mixed reviews. Although some praised it for its cinematography, others deeply criticised its portrayal of the student protests by "over-simplyfying" the events of 1968, "focusing too much on the government conspiracy" and putting forth a notion of a deep state in Mexico, distorting how the events unfolded, making it ultimately PRI propaganda.

== Cast and crew ==
The series is produced by filmmaker Gabriel Ripstein, who is also one of its executive producers and writers, and is starring award winner actor Daniel Giménez Cacho as Fernando Barrientos. It also stars:

- Antonio de la Vega as Interior Minister Luis Echeverría
- Fernando Becerril as Mexico City Mayor Alfonso Corona del Rosal
- Hernán Del Riego as Mexican President Gustavo Díaz Ordaz
- Karina Gidi as Mrs. Esperanza Barrientos
- Kristyan Ferrer as Beto a shady student leader
- Andrés Delgado as David an important activist leader, loosely based in the renowned journalist and writer Luis González de Alba.
- Irene Azuela as Elena, Commander Barrientos' assistant, right hand and secret lover.

== See also ==
- Rojo Amanecer (Award-winning 1989 Mexican film focusing on the same subject, from the perspective of the repressed students)
- Winston M. Scott (CIA chief depicted in the series)
- CIA cryptonym (The main character was part of the CIA's LITEMPO Spy network)
