= Alberto Peláez =

Spanish journalist

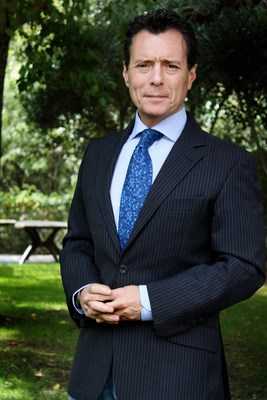
- Born: Alberto Peláez Montejos; 22 February 1964 (age 62); Madrid
- Occupation: Journalist
- Spouse: Monica Arredondo

Alberto Peláez (born 22 February 1964 in Madrid, Spain) is a war journalist, writer and correspondent, currently working as chief correspondent of the news of Televisa in Spain.

== Career path ==
Alberto Peláez is the son of journalist and communicator Joaquín Peláez, with a long professional career in media such as Cadena Ser, where he received among several other Ondas Awards as the best program-manager in 1967.

From an early age, Alberto Peláez read the literary and journalistic texts that his father encouraged. Due to his travels and language skills, today Peláez is a journalist with a wide and global lens.

He graduated in journalism from the Universidad Complutense de Madrid and completed a postgraduate degree in International Communication in 1984 at Harvard University. At the same time, he combined his studies with his skills as a film and television dubbing actor from 1981 to 1989, where he acquired better voice handling, intonation and acting. Among other works, he voiced a young Tom Hanks in the film Big in Spain.

The beginnings of Alberto Peláez began on Radio Montecarlo in Paris in the summer of 1983, and soon after, he began collaborating with New York's Spanish-speaking 47 channel. In 1985 he entered work for the media group Televisa, becoming in time, a notable correspondent for all of Latin America. In the last 33 years he has covered for the television channel important events of a world character.

He has witnessed 19 wars, going on to conduct exclusive interviews with such important and influential figures in history as Yasser Arafat or Muammar Gaddafi, or the leader of Hamas sheikh Ahmed Yassin.

Peláez has also interviewed Spanish, European, and Latin American politicians, such as former Spanish presidents Felipe González, José María Aznar, José Luis Rodríguez Zapatero, the Portuguese Head of State Aníbal Cavaco Silva, the former presidents of Mexico Ernesto Zedillo, Carlos Salinas, Vicente Fox and Felipe Calderón, the former president of Peru Alejandro Toledo or former Argentine President Carlos Menem among others.

Peláez has written and edited 5 books. He began his literary career in 1992, with literature ranging from the journalistic genre to the essay or the novel.

For 13 years he was a columnist for the Milenio newspaper and writes for the newspaper El Universal (Mexico), in addition to collaborating with Grupo Radio Centro and different stations, radio stations and Spanish media.

He is the winner of the Golden Antenna and the International Press Club award, which was given to him at the hands of the king Juan Carlos I.

He continues to work as Chief Correspondent for Televisa, covering the most important national and international news for Mexico. He lectures on development and personal growth throughout Mexico, from the most important universities to multinational companies.

== War correspondent ==
Coverage of warfare such as:

- Invasion of Kuwait by Iraq 1990
- Gulf War Persian War I 1990 – 1991
- Kurdish Exodus from Iraq to Turkey 1991
- Yugoslav Wars 1991 – 1994
- Slovenia
- Croatia
- Bosnia – Sarajevo, Mostar, Livno...
- Algerian Civil War Algerian War 1992
- Russian Constitutional Crisis of 1993 Coup d'état in Russia 1993
- Burundi Civil War War hutus tutsis Rwanda 1995
- Somali Civil War winter 1994 – summer 1995
- Israeli-Palestinian conflict 1997, 1998, 1999, 2001, 2002
- Afghanistan War 2001 – 2002
- Iraq War Persian II 2002
- 2011 Libyan War

== Speaker ==
Its coverages in its 19 wars have enabled Peláez to become an important speaker. Leadership, overcoming, teamwork are some of the conferences that Peláez gives based on his knowledge of war cover. Among the different conferences Alberto has given on leadership and improvement, some of them have been for the following companies, agencies and universities.

- ACE Fianzas Monterrey.
- Aeromexico.
- Group Chedraui.
- Forum Canacintra.
- University of Colima.
- Tamaulipas Autonomous University.
- Universidad Autónoma de Puebla
- University of the Valley of Mexico on the Campuses of Querétaro, Aguascalientes, San Luis Potosí, [[Guadalajara (Mexico)] Guadalajara]] and Mexicali.
- City Hall of Villahermosa, Tabasco.
- City Hall of Coatzacoalcos, Veracruz.
- Carlos Septien University of Mexico.
- University La Salle (Mexico).
- University of La Rábida de Cádiz.
- Complutense University of Madrid.
- Master Professor Board of Spokespersons taught by CESMA
- Space 1997 (Courses taught by Televisa to young university students).
- Space 2004 (Courses taught by Televisa to young university students.)
- City Hall Conference Metepec (Hidalgo).
- Government Conference Campeche.
- Government Conference of the State of Hidalgo.

=== Biarritz Fórum ===
In the year 2000, the then-Mayor-Senator of the city of [Biarritz], in the south of France, Didier Borotra created a Forum of political, business economic thinking that brought together the most important politicians from both sides of the Atlantic. This forum, during its 11 years of existence, was attended by the most important politicians and entrepreneurs from European and Latin American countries.

During all the years of the Forum, "Alberto Peláez"' had a very active participation as a speaker but mainly as master of ceremonies. This was attended by personalities such as former presidents, such as Miguel de la Madrid (Mexico), Jaime Paz Zamora (Bolivia), Alvaro Uribe (Colombia), Ernesto Samper (Colombia) or Leonel Fernández (Dominican Republic), among others. Also current presidents such as Enrique Peña Nieto (Mexico), Michelle Bachelet (Chile), or Rafael Correa (Ecuador).

This idea of Mayor Borotra was expanded to do so one year in the city of Biarritz and the next in a Latin American city. Biarritz's forum traveled to Valle de Bravo Mexico, Santiago de Chile, Bogotá Colombia and Quito Ecuador .

=== Books ===
- Correspondent in Yugoslavia, chronicles from Hell (Editorial Planeta 1992)
- War Log (Editorial Clio March 2002)
- The new war: objective Saddam (Editorial Grijalbo April 2003)
- Forgetting Memory (Editorial Violet Effect June 2012)
- Mexico a look (November 2013)
