= Jacobo Zabludovsky =

Mexican journalist (1928–2015)

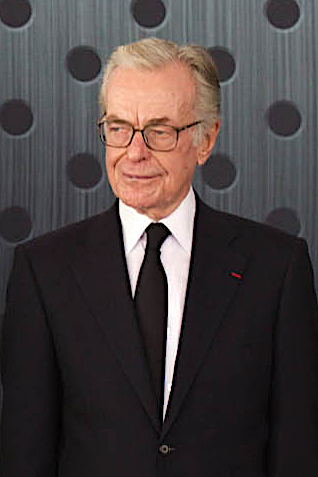
- Born: Jacobo Zabludovsky Kraveski; May 24, 1928; Mexico City, Mexico
- Died: July 2, 2015 (aged 87); Mexico City, Mexico
- Occupation: Journalist
- Spouse: Sara Zabludovsky (née Sara Nerubay)
- Children: Abraham Zabludovsky Nerubay (journalist)
- Relatives: Abraham Zabludovsky (architect), brother

Jacobo Zabludovsky Kraveski (May 24, 1928 – July 2, 2015) was a Mexican journalist. He was the first anchorman in Mexican television and his TV news program, 24 Horas (24 Hours) was for decades regarded as the most important in the country.

== Early life ==
Zabludovsky was born in 1928 in Mexico City to Polish Jewish immigrants. He was the brother of Abraham Zabludovsky (1924-2003), a famous architect.

== Career ==
Zabludovsky was a well known anchor man hosting 24 Horas, the main news program on the popular Televisa network between 1970 and 1998. Owing to the nonconfrontational approach of the network, the programme was perceived as partisan and supportive of the government.

In 1998, citing a desire to cut down his workload and ill-health, he retired from presenting 24 Horas, which also came to an end with his departure, marking the end of an era in Mexican journalism. After leaving 24 Horas, Zabludovsky worked on special newscasts and documentaries. However, in 2000, he resigned from the Televisa network following the resignation of his son, Abraham, who also worked for Televisa. Zabludovsky claimed that his son had been overlooked for the position of night time news anchor and that he was resigning out of solidarity with him.

During his career at Televisa, Zabludovsky covered several important issues. He was one of the few Mexicans reporting in Cuba the day Fidel Castro entered Havana in 1959 during the overthrow of the Batista dictatorship and reported from his car phone (at that time these car phones were the only mobile phones in Mexico and were a luxury item), and reported on the 1985 earthquake that destroyed several parts of Mexico City. However, there was criticism of his coverage of presidential elections in 1988 and 1994, when he favored the candidate of the government party to the exclusion of opposition contenders. He interviewed many notable people, including President Ernesto Zedillo, Salvador Dalí and María Félix.

Eighteen months after leaving television, he began a radio newscast on a new station, La 69 at Grupo Radio Centro, with the pledge of being more critical "...in agreement with the new Mexico in which we are living". Beginning on March 3, 2004, the newscast was also broadcast on Radio Red AM and Radio Red FM. Zabludovsky hosted the newscast until June 22, 2015, being hospitalized shortly after.

From 2007 until 2015, he also wrote "Bucareli", a weekly column for Mexican nationwide newspaper El Universal.

In 2009, his voice appeared in Up, a Disney-Pixar film.

Zabludovsky returned to television in 2012 as part of ESPN Deportes and ESPN Mexico's coverage of the 2012 Summer Olympics, he was also part of the network's coverage of the 2013 FIFA Confederations Cup the following year. On June 2, 2015, exactly one month before his death, Zabludovsky covered the historic match between the Cuba national football team and the New York Cosmos in Havana, Cuba. The match marked the first time an American sports team visited Cuba after the United States began normalizing relations with the island nation.

== In popular culture ==
Zabludovsky is the subject of Molotov's song "Que No Te Haga Bobo Jacobo" (Don't let Jacobo make a fool out of you), where he is accused of receiving bribes from Carlos Salinas and negotiating the news with the government. In a 2013 interview, Zabludovsky said about the song: "I have never heard it, I don't know if it's offensive, but if it was, they have the right to express what they think".

Zabludovsky is portrayed by the Venezuelan actor Albi De Abreu in Women in Blue (Las Azules), the Apple TV+ crime drama set in Mexico City in 1971, in a recurring role across the first season.

== Death ==
Zabludovsky died of a stroke caused by dehydration at the age of 87 in Mexico City on the morning of July 2, 2015. He was buried at Mexico City's Israelite (Jewish) Cemetery that afternoon. He was survived by his wife Sara and three children.

Media offices
Preceded by Position established	Televisa Nightly News Anchor; September 7, 1970 – January 19, 1998	Succeeded by Guillermo Ortega Ruiz
