= Natalia Téllez =

Mexican actress and host (born 1985)

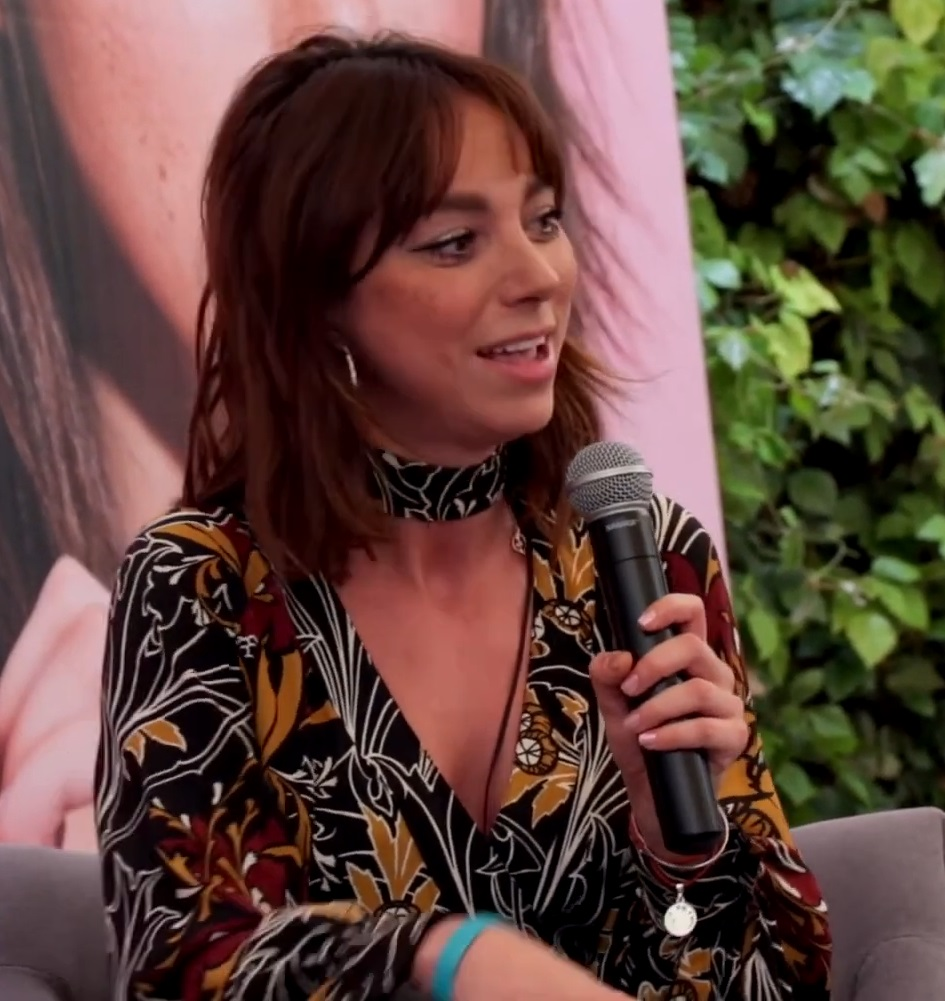
- Born: Natalia Téllez Martínez; December 16, 1985 (age 40); Mexico City, Mexico
- Education: Centro de Educación Artística
- Occupations: Actress; television presenter
- Years active: 2004–present
- Relatives: Artemisa Téllez (sister)

Natalia Téllez (born Natalia Téllez Martínez; December 16, 1985) is a Mexican actress and TV presenter. She is known as a host of the talk show Netas Divinas and of the competition programs La Voz... México and ¿Quién es la máscara?, and for her role as Valentina Camacho in the Apple TV+ series Women in Blue (2024–2026).

== Biography ==
In her childhood, Natalia Téllez studied at the Félix de Jesús Rougier Institute in Mexico City. She is the daughter of the painter Guillermo Téllez and sister of the writer Artemisa Téllez. She later studied at the Centro de Educación Artística, belonging to the Mexican company Televisa. She had several jobs as a model and worked in the soap operas Rebelde and Palabra de mujer. In 2008, she had a role in the series La Rosa de Guadalupe. The following year, she collaborated with Benny Ibarra in his video clip "Dejalo ir" and had the opportunity to host her own program called El mundo al revés con Natalia.

In 2012, she was the host of the Telehit Music Band program and participated in the television series Hoy soy nadie and Cuenta pendiente. In 2013, she became the host of the reality show La Voz... México, a role she remained in for three seasons. She hosted the program Telehit New Generation and Diablito Show in 2015, in addition to acting in the television series Logout. The following year, she was part of the program Hoy, and the series 40 y 20.

In 2017, she appeared in the music video for "Tóxico" by Christian Chávez. In 2018, she starred alongside Renata Notni, Dhasia Wezca and Melina Figueroa in the music video "Eso No Va a Suceder" by the American duo Ha*Ash. Additionally, she was part of the leadership of Netas Divinas. In 2019, she became the host of the Mexican show produced by Televisa, ¿Quién es la máscara? along with Omar Chaparro.

In 2024, Téllez took on one of the four lead roles, as police recruit Valentina Camacho, in Women in Blue (Las Azules), an Apple TV+ crime drama set in Mexico City in 1971. The series was renewed for a second season, which began streaming in August 2026.

== Filmography ==
=== Film ===
Year	Title	Role	Ref.
2022	Amores permitidos	Gabriela	
2023	Quiero tu vida	Ángela	

=== Television ===
Year	Title	Role	Notes	Ref.
2004	Rebelde	Karen	Telenovela	
2007	Palabra de mujer	Betty Ortiz	Telenovela	
2008	La rosa de Guadalupe		Episode: "Soy emo"	
2009	Qué show con Alejandra Bogue			
2012	Hoy soy nadie			
2014	Cuenta pendiente			
2015	Logout		Interactive series	
2016	40 y 20			
2021	Te acuerdas de mí	Dolores "Lola" Solís	Telenovela	
2022	Todo por Lucy			
2024	Profe infiltrado	Sofía		
2024–2026	Women in Blue (Las Azules)	Valentina Camacho	Apple TV+ series	

=== Television presenting ===
Year	Title	Notes	Ref.
2009	El mundo al revés con Natalia		
2012	Telehit Music Band		
2013–2016	La Voz... México		
2015	Telehit New Generation		
2015	Diablito Show		
2015–2016	Videos con Natalia		
2016–2018	Hoy		
2018–present	Netas Divinas		
2019	¿Quién es la máscara?	With Omar Chaparro	
2026	Operación Triunfo Estados Unidos	Judge	

=== Music videos ===
Year	Song	Artist	Ref.
2009	"Déjalo ir"	Benny Ibarra	
2017	"Tóxico"	Christian Chávez	
2018	"Eso No Va a Suceder"	Ha*Ash	
