= List of people from Evanston, Illinois =

The following list includes notable people who were born or have lived in Evanston, Illinois. For a similar list organized alphabetically by last name, see the category page People from Evanston, Illinois.

== Academia ==
- Harrison Hayford, Melville scholar, professor at Northwestern University
- Oliver Marcy, two-time president of Northwestern University
- Dale T. Mortensen, Nobel Prize winner in economics, faculty of Northwestern University
- Gail Thain Parker, scholar of American literature, president of Bennington College
- Dwight H. Perkins, economist, Harvard University
- Edmund Phelps, Nobel Prize winner in economics and professor
- Ernest Samuels, Northwestern faculty, Pulitzer Prize winner
- Morton O. Schapiro, 16th president of Northwestern University, and 16th president of Williams College
- Stuart Vyse, psychologist and author; specialist on superstitions
- John Carrier Weaver, professor of geography, and college administrator for several major universities in the United States
- John Henry Wigmore, dean of Northwestern Law School

== Business ==
- William Liston Brown, director of American Ship Building Company
- James Cayne, former CEO of Bear Stearns
- Lester Crown, son of Chicago financier Henry Crown and controls family holdings
- John Donahoe, president and CEO of eBay, born in Evanston
- Bob Galvin, former CEO of Motorola
- Hecky Powell, restaurateur
- Robert Sampson, disability rights activist born in Evanston
- Gordon Segal, founder and CEO of Crate & Barrel
- Gwynne Shotwell, businesswoman, engineer, president and chief operating officer of SpaceX
- John C. Whitehead, banker, chairman of Goldman Sachs, U.S. deputy secretary of state 1985–89, board member of World Trade Center Memorial Foundation (WTC Memorial Foundation)

== Entertainment ==
- Kate Baldwin, actress and singer
- Viola Barry, silent film actress
- William Bassett, actor
- Carlos Bernard, actor
- Marlon Brando, actor
- Tamara Braun, actress
- Heather Burns, actress
- Ronnie Burns, actor
- Timothy Carhart, actor
- William Christopher, actor, charity spokesperson
- Joan Cusack, actress
- John Cusack, actor
- John Dickson, poet and short story writer
- Sean Evans, host of Hot Ones
- Robert Falls, director
- Richard Fancy, actor
- Pat Finn, actor
- Julie Fulton, actress
- Zach Gilford, actor
- Alicia Goranson, actress
- Seth Gordon, director, producer, editor
- Laura Harrier, actress
- Barbara Harris, actress
- Charlton Heston, actor
- Anders Holm, comedian and co-creator of Workaholics
- James Jewell, voice actor, producer and director for radio shows The Lone Ranger and The Green Hornet
- Jake Johnson, actor
- Amanda Jones, Miss Illinois USA 1973 & Miss USA 1973
- Tim Kazurinsky, actor and writer, Saturday Night Live
- Walter Kerr, drama critic
- Lauren Lapkus, actor and comedian
- Jeffrey Lieber, writer and co-creator of the television series Lost
- Richard Long, actor
- Michael Madsen, actor
- John Lee Mahin, Oscar-nominated screenwriter
- Jeff McCracken, actor, director, producer
- Elizabeth McGovern, Oscar-nominated actress
- Patrick Melton, screenwriter
- Josh Meyers, actor and comedian
- Seth Meyers, actor and comedian
- John Moffatt, producer
- Jessie Mueller, actress and singer
- Bill Murray, actor and comedian
- Ajay Naidu, actor and singer
- Christopher Nolan, director, screenwriter, and producer
- Jonathan Nolan, screenwriter, producer and director
- James Olson, actor
- Geeta Patel, film and TV director
- D.A. Pennebaker, documentary filmmaker
- William Petersen, actor
- Steve Pink, director, screenwriter, and producer
- Jeremy Piven, actor
- Shira Piven, director
- David Schwimmer, actor
- Anna D. Shapiro, award-winning director
- Martin Sherman, actor
- Jerry Springer
- Debra Stipe, actress
- Hope Summers, actress, founder of Evanston's Showcase Theater
- Daniel Sunjata, actor
- Dave VanDam, voice actor
- Lori Voornas, radio personality
- Ruby Wax, comedian
- Jenniffer Weigel, actress, writer
- Rafer Weigel, actor, television personality

== Music ==
- Steve Albini, music producer
- Fred Anderson, saxophonist
- Benjamin Bagby, singer, performer of medieval music
- Stuart D. Bogie, musician and arranger
- David Burge, pianist
- Kenneth C. Burns, Jethro of Homer and Jethro
- Kevin Cronin, of REO Speedwagon
- Patti Drew, 1960s soul singer
- Alexander Frey, conductor, pianist, organist, harpsichordist, composer and recording artist
- Ezra Furman, of Ezra Furman and the Harpoons
- Steve Goodman, songwriter and musician
- Greg Graffin
- Nancy Gustafson, opera singer
- David Ryan Harris, musician
- Stafford James, musician, composer
- Josh Kantor, organist
- Howard Levy, harmonica musician
- Junior Mance, jazz pianist and composer
- Jason Narducy, musician
- Michael Omartian, pianist, keyboard player and producer
- Julianne Phillips, model and actress
- Matthew Polenzani, opera singer
- Ryan Raddon, producer known as Kaskade
- Frank Rosenwein, classical oboist
- Joe Rushton, jazz bass saxophonist
- Natalie Sleeth, composer
- Grace Slick, of Jefferson Starship
- Patrick Stump, of Fall Out Boy
- Eddie Vedder, of Pearl Jam
- Loraine Wyman, early 20th-century performer and fieldworker in folk song

== Politics, government, and military ==
- W. Russell Arrington, Illinois state legislator and lawyer
- Alan E. Ashcraft Jr., Illinois state representative and judge
- George Wildman Ball, undersecretary of state for Presidents Kennedy and Johnson
- James J. Barbour, Illinois lawyer and state legislator, practiced law in Evanston
- John Lourie Beveridge, 16th governor of Illinois
- Charles E. Browne, Wisconsin territorial legislator
- Marguerite S. Church, U.S. representative 1951–1963
- Ralph E. Church, U.S. representative 1935–1941, 1943–1950
- James M. Cole, U.S. deputy attorney general
- Burton C. Cook, U.S. representative 1865–1871
- Charles Gates Dawes, vice president of the United States, 1925–1929; Nobel Peace Prize winner, 1925
- Henry M. Dawes, U.S. Comptroller of the Currency 1923–1924
- Frances L. Dawson, Illinois state representative and educator
- Thomas C. Foley, U.S. ambassador to Ireland, 2010 Republican gubernatorial candidate in Connecticut
- Robert Gettleman, federal judge
- James William Good, U.S. Secretary of War 1929
- Nathaniel M. Gorton, federal judge
- Mary Jeanne Hallstrom, nurse and politician
- Julian J. Hook, Minnesota state legislator and lawyer
- Jim Kolbe, congressman
- Lynn Morley Martin, Secretary of Labor under President George H.W. Bush
- Catherine Waugh McCulloch, lawyer, suffragist, first woman to be elected justice of the peace in Illinois
- H.H.C. Miller, colonel to Illinois Governor Richard Yates, Jr., three-time mayor of Evanston
- Lenora Moragne (1931–2020), nutritionist
- Lorraine H. Morton, mayor of Evanston, Illinois 1993–2009; Evanston's longest serving mayor, first Democratic mayor and first African-American mayor
- John Porter, congressman
- Donald Rumsfeld, U.S. Secretary of Defense, congressman
- Jan Schakowsky, U.S. representative 1999–Pres
- Andrew Shuman, lieutenant governor of Illinois 1877–1881
- Joseph A. Strohl, Wisconsin state senator
- Leroy D. Thoman, U.S. Civil Service Commissioner 1883–1885
- Julius White, American Civil War brigadier general
- Roger Williams, U.S. representative for Texas

== Scientists ==
- Isabella Garnett, pioneering African-American female physician and founder of Community Hospital
- J. Allen Hynek, astronomer, professor, and ufologist
- Peter Shirley, computer scientist and computer graphics researcher

== Sports figures ==
- Mike Adamle, NFL running back and sports broadcaster
- Cornelia Wicker Armsby, golfer
- Bessie Anthony, golfer
- Elmer Bennett, ACB basketball player
- Dave Bergman, MLB player for the New York Yankees, Houston Astros, San Francisco Giants and Detroit Tigers
- Pete Burnside, MLB pitcher for the New York Giants, San Francisco Giants, Washington Senators, Detroit Tigers and Baltimore Orioles
- John Castino, MLB infielder for the Minnesota Twins
- Jack Cooley, basketball player for the University of Notre Dame
- Yu Darvish, baseball player for the Chicago Cubs
- Kate Del Fava, NWSL player for the Utah Royals
- Luke Donald, professional golfer
- Paddy Driscoll, Hall of Fame football player
- Caleb Durbin, MLB infielder for the Milwaukee Brewers
- Lindsey Durlacher, wrestler
- Kevin Foster, MLB pitcher for the Chicago Cubs, Philadelphia Phillies, and Texas Rangers
- Pat Fitzgerald, head football coach for the Northwestern Wildcats
- Tim Floyd NBA and college basketball coach
- Clint Frank, college football halfback, 1937 Heisman Trophy winner
- Kevin Frederick, MLB pitcher for the Minnesota Twins and Toronto Blue Jays
- Timothy Goebel, Olympic figure skater
- Dov Grumet-Morris (born 1982), ice hockey player
- Jim Hart, NFL quarterback
- Robert Jeangerard, Olympic basketball gold medalist
- Damon Jones, NFL tight end
- Brandon Hyde, coach for the Chicago Cubs
- Mike Kenn, offensive tackle for the Atlanta Falcons, Pro Bowl selection
- Bob Lackey, Marquette and ABA basketball player
- Jim Lindeman, MLB player for the St. Louis Cardinals, Detroit Tigers, Philadelphia Phillies, Houston Astros and New York Mets
- Freddie Lindstrom, Hall of Fame baseball player
- Billy Martin, tennis player and coach
- Brian McBride, soccer player
- J. J. McCarthy, NFL quarterback for the Minnesota Vikings
- Bob Mionske, Olympic and professional bicycle racer
- Emery Moorehead, tight end for Super Bowl XX champion Chicago Bears
- Steve Parker, NFL player
- Wes Parker, MLB first baseman for the Los Angeles Dodgers
- Josh Paul, MLB catcher for the Chicago White Sox, Chicago Cubs, Los Angeles Angels of Anaheim and Tampa Bay Devil Rays
- Dan Peterson, basketball coach
- Mike Quade, baseball player, coach and manager of Chicago Cubs
- Dewey Robinson, MLB pitcher for the Chicago White Sox
- Mike Rogodzinski, MLB outfielder for the Philadelphia Phillies
- Clarke Rosenberg (born 1993), American-Israeli basketball player in the Israel Basketball Premier League
- Erik Spoelstra, head coach, Miami Heat
- Everette Stephens, player for the Indiana Pacers and Milwaukee Bucks
- Dick Strahs, MLB pitcher for the Chicago White Sox
- Peter Ueberroth, sixth commissioner of Major League Baseball, chairman of the United States Olympic Committee
- Ed Weiland, MLB pitcher for the Chicago White Sox
- Aaron Williams, NBA basketball player
- Tommy Wingels, NHL player for the Chicago Blackhawks

== Visual artists, designers ==
- Jane Fulton Alt, photographer
- George Bloom, television director and visual effects artist
- John Dilg, painter and educator
- Edie Fake, fine artist and comic/zine author
- Karen Finley, performance artist
- Margaret Burnham Geddes, architect
- Martha Nessler Hayden, painter
- Kysa Johnson, painter
- Albert Henry Krehbiel, art teacher; impressionist painter and muralist; married to Dulah Marie Evans; died in Evanston
- Allison Miller, abstract painter
- Eugene Montgomery, painter
- Gertrude O'Brady, artist
- Jay Ryan, illustrator and screen-printer, working professionally as The Bird Machine, musician
- Robert Slimbach, typeface designer, author of Myriad, Adobe Garamond, Adobe Jenson, Utopia, Cronos
- Adrian Smith, architect of the tallest building in the world
- Alan Wanzenberg, architect and designer
- Gahan Wilson, cartoonist for The New Yorker, Playboy
- Erik Winquist, visual effects artist

== Writers, playwrights, journalists ==
- Mildred L. Batchelder, namesake of the ALA award given to the publisher of a translated children's book
- Beatrice Bruteau, contemplative, philosopher and author
- Algis Budrys, science fiction author
- Carolyn Crimi, writer of children's books
- Allen G. Debus, historian of science and medicine, known primarily for his work on the history of chemistry and alchemy
- Sarah Dessen, fiction author
- Carl Fick, author and film director
- James Foley, journalist, freelance war correspondent, and first American killed by the terrorist group, the Islamic State of Iraq and the Levant,
- Leon Forrest, novelist
- Jeffrey Gettleman, journalist
- Charles Gibson, news anchor
- Laurens Hammond, inventor of the Hammond organ
- George W. Hotchkiss, 19th-century journalist, editor, historian, and lumber dealer
- Cassidy Hubbarth, sports anchor
- Charles R. Johnson, author, National Book Award winner
- Clara Ingram Judson, children's book author
- Benay Lappe, publicist, professor, writer, female theologian, Covenant Award winner in education
- Susan Lukas, née Ries, writer
- Mark McIntosh, priest and theologian
- Samuel Merwin, author and playwright
- Bob Mionske, attorney, author, former Olympic and professional bicycle racer
- Drew Pearson, newspaper columnist
- Torrey Peters, author and PEN/Hemingway Award winner
- Richard Powers, author and National Book Award winner
- Alice Riley (1867–1955), author of children's media; founder of the Drama League of America and the Evanston Arts Center; lived in Evanston
- Albert Tangora, holder of world speed record for typing on a manual typewriter
- George Thiem, 1950 Pulitzer Prize-winning reporter
- Edward Thomson, writer and bishop of the Methodist Episcopal Church
- Henry Kitchell Webster, author and playwright
- Edmund White, literary critic, novelist
- Frances Willard, temperance advocate and suffragist
- Garry Wills, Pulitzer Prize-winning writer/critic

== Other ==
- Starr Faithfull, socialite known for her unsolved death
- Vegas Matt, YouTuber known for gambling in Las Vegas
- Yael Eckstein, president and Global CEO of the International Fellowship of Christians and Jews
