= I Can See Your Voice (American game show) season 3 =

Television game show season

I Can See Your Voice
- Season 3
- Starring: Adrienne Bailon-Houghton; Cheryl Hines
- Hosted by: Main: Ken Jeong; Guests: Joel McHale (Note: Season highlights: Interim hosts as replacements for Ken Jeong: As part of his promotion for a then-upcoming 2nd season of Animal Control, Joel McHale filled the 1st part's last 2 episodes (7–8), followed by a finale of another game show We Are Family, also replacing Anthony Anderson.; Nick Cannon, whose crossed over from The Masked Singer, also filled the second part, with similar occurrences (eps. 11–12) as did in the previous one.); Nick Cannon
- No. of episodes: 12

Release
- Original network: Fox
- Original release: Part 1: January 3 – February 21, 2024; Part 2: May 16 – June 6, 2024

Season chronology
- ← Previous; Season 2

The third season of the American television mystery music game show I Can See Your Voice was originally scheduled to premiere on Fox on September 19, 2023 as a replacement programming due to the WGA and SAG–AFTRA strikes, but it was replaced by reruns of 9-1-1: Lone Star in its timeslot instead; this was later pushed back to its normal winter scheduling, with first set of episodes began airing on January 3, 2024, followed by a second that resumed on May 16, 2024. It was filmed at Trilith Studios in Fayetteville, Georgia.

== Gameplay ==
=== Format ===
According to the original South Korean rules, the guest artist and contestant(s) must attempt to eliminate bad singers during its game phase. At the final performance, the last remaining mystery singer is revealed as either good or bad by means of a duet between them and one of the guest artists. (Note: Gameplay note: The number of contestants are set to one (for the rest of episodes) or a group of two (ep. 8).)

The contestant(s) must eliminate one mystery singer at the end of each round, receiving $15,000 if they eliminate a bad singer. At the end of the game, if the contestant(s) decide to walk away, they will keep the money had won in previous rounds; if they decide to risk for the last remaining mystery singer, they win $100,000 if a singer is good, or lose their all winnings if a singer is bad.

=== Rounds ===
1. Lip Sync Showdown
  Six mystery singers are divided into pairs, in which each compete a lip sync battle against each other.
2. Unlock my Life
  The guest artist and contestant(s) are presented with a video package containing possible clues by one of the mystery singers of their choice.
  - A Day in the Life — The guest artist and contestant(s) are presented with a video package chronicling the daily lives by one of the mystery singers.
  - Secret Snoop — The guest artist and contestant(s) "tour" one of the mystery singer's homes for clues (which may include red herrings) for 60 seconds.
  - Super Fan — The guest artist and contestant(s) are presented with a video package featuring a "super fan" by one of the mystery singers.
3. Interrogation
  The guest artist and contestant(s) may ask questions to the remaining mystery singers. Good singers are required to give truthful responses, while the bad singers must lie.

== Episodes ==
=== Guest artists ===
Legend:
Good singer
Bad singer
— Contestant(s) chose to risk the money.
— Contestant(s) chose to walk away with the money.

Episode		Theme	Guest artist (Note: Players' notes: For the returning guest artists (who also include foreigners and former good singers), names are displayed in italics.; For the mixed groups, names who identified as bad singers are displayed in italics.)	Contestant	Mystery singers (In their respective numbers and aliases)					
#	Date	Theme	Guest artist	Contestant	Elimination order					Winner
#	Date	Theme	Guest artist	Contestant	Lip Sync Showdown			Unlock my Life	Interrogation	Winner
Part 1
1	January 3, 2024	Unthemed	Lauren Alaina	Brett Finau → $100,000	4. Abigail Smith; (Sorority Sister)	3. Dee Dee Davis; (Camper)	5. Zachary Welsh; (Woodworker)	6. Janet Stockdale; (Medic)	2. Anthony Gargiula; (Red Carpet Correspondent)	1. Beda Spindola; (Lunch Lady)
2	January 10, 2024	"Queen Night"	Gavin DeGraw	Matt Peng → $30,000	3. Angelica Nicole; (Archeologist)	6. Josh Petersdorf; (Electrician)	5. Cartreze Tucker; (Theater Usher)	1. Meaghan Ranee Moyers; (X-Ray Technician)	4. Alexa Aronson; (Ice Cream Scooper)	2. D'Angelo Talbot; (Roofer)
3	January 17, 2024	"Divas Night"	Dionne Warwick	Iliana Cordero → $45,000	2. Von Kurotsuki; (Cosplayer)	5. Alyssa Harris; (Spin Instructor)	4. Stephanie Ferrett; (Stay-at-home Mom)	3. Casey Dressler; (Wedding Planner)	1. Natalya Jackson; (Esthetician)	6. Alyson Nash; (Hairstylist)
4	January 24, 2024	"Decades Night"	Adrienne Bailon-Houghton	Linda Griffin → $45,000	5. Carmetha Fulgiam; (Mobile Sales Associate)	2. Tristan Turner; (Theme Park Zombie)	6. Tom Young; (Pickleball Player)	3. Demetrius Thornton; (Construction Worker)	1. Macey Mac; (Fisherman)	4. Lemuel Gonsalves; (Driver)
5	January 31, 2024	"Sports Night"	Montell Jordan	Laura Davlantes → $60,000	1. Brianne Nealon; (Lacrosse Player)	3. Elgin David; (Breakdancer)	5. Giselle Chusan; (Swimmer)	4. Janelle Marie; (Referee)	6. Andy Pita; (Tailgater)	2. Shaylen Harger; (Ultimate Frisbee Player)
6	February 7, 2024	"Motown Night"	Johnny Gill	Chris Popper → $30,000	3. Noah Peters; (Barber)	1. Bruce Grey; (Pizza Delivery Guy)	4. Christian Strong; (Neurosurgeon)	2. Symone Springs; (Hotel Concierge)	6. Kiera Jefferson; (Kickball Player)	5. Romen Bosellino; (White House Staffer)
7	February 14, 2024	"Doppelgänger Night"	Carnie Wilson	Blake Bierman → $45,000	4. Peter Lillyman; (Justin Timberlake Doppelgänger)	3. Sofia Divene; (Christina Aguilera Doppelgänger)	5. Kenni Powe; (Lizzo Doppelgänger)	1. Jake McKenna; (Zach Galifianakis Doppelgänger)	6. Jason Stanly; (Jason Statham Doppelgänger)	2. Taylor Madison; (Kylie Jenner Doppelgänger)
8	February 21, 2024	"Twinning Night"	Michelle Williams	Kelvin and Alvin Mantey → $100,000	1. Matt and John Drinkwater; (Baseball Players)	4. Aidan and Dotan Horowitz; (Personal Trainers)	3. Inna Polishuk and Olya Gritsak; (Spa Owners)	5. Cassandra and Brenda Lona; (Daycare Workers)	6. Tyra and Tiara Lewis; (Aerospace Engineers)	2. Ali Butler and Susie Pepper; (Podcasters)
Part 2
9	May 16, 2024	"Elvis Night"	Tyler Hilton	Marquis Stewart → $30,000	2. Brandon Bennett; (Firefighter)	1. Davida Roach; (Detention Deputy)	3. Lori Voornas; (Radio Host)	4. Nicole Acosta; (College Student)	6. Wyatt Spivey; (Farmer)	5. Denzel Crisp; (Bellhop)
10	May 23, 2024	Unthemed	Shawn Stockman (Boyz II Men)	Ashanti Harris → $60,000	1. Michael Conner Humphreys; (Child Star)	6. Emma Negrete; (Backpacker)	2. Adrianna Vieux; (Hip Hop Dancer)	5. Adrian Perez; (Beekeeper)	3. Aaron Shapiro; (College Professor)	4. Nakia Mann; (Stand-up Comedian)
11	May 30, 2024	"Country Night"	Maddie & Tae	Hailey Henson → $30,000	5. Ali Taylor Terradillos; (Belly Dancer)	1. Gary Wayne; (Steel Worker)	4. Alaina Richard; (Attorney)	6. Kimberly Yveete; (Production Assistant)	3. Hannah Beth Sprouse; (High Jumper)	2. Tyler Kohrs; (Preschool Teacher)
12	June 6, 2024	"Vegas Night"	Chris Kirkpatrick (NSYNC)	Taylor Frame → $100,000	4. Michael White; (Queen Bianca)	5. Allegra "Pi" DuVal; (Britney Spears Impersonator)	6. J.R. Phelps; (Cocktail Waitress)	2. Olivia Kuper Harris; (Showgirl)	1. David Terry; (Magic Mic)	3. Mecca Madison; (Club Promoter)

=== Panelists ===
Legend:
Regular panelist
Guest panelist

Apps		Panelists in attendance (Sorted by first appearance, with episode designations)
g#	p#	Panelists in attendance (Sorted by first appearance, with episode designations)
12	1	Cheryl Hines (1–2)
11	1	Adrienne Bailon-Houghton (1–3, 5–12)
2	1	Ron Funches (2, 10)
1	20	DeRay Davis and Nikki Glaser (1); Jennie Garth and Thomas Lennon (2); Todrick Hall (3); Romeo Miller, Frankie Muniz, and Melissa Peterman (4); Dwight Howard and Jon Lovitz (5); Kate Flannery and NeNe Leakes (6); Maggie Lawson (7); Lisa Ann Walter (8); Jimmie Allen and Cheyenne Jackson (9); Finesse Mitchell (11); Penn Jillette and Porsha Williams (12)

== Reception ==
Viewership and ratings per episode of I Can See Your Voice (American game show) season 3
No.	Title	Air date	Timeslot (ET)	Rating (18–49)	Viewers (millions)	Ref.
1	"Premiere: Lauren Alaina, Nikki Glaser, DeRay Davis, Cheryl Hines, Adrienne Bailon-Houghton"	January 3, 2024	Wednesday 8:00 p.m.	0.3	2.11	
2	"Queen Night: Gavin DeGraw, Thomas Lennon, Jennie Garth, Adrienne Bailon-Houghton, Cheryl Hines"	January 10, 2024	Wednesday 8:00 p.m.	0.2	1.89	
3	"Divas Night: Dionne Warwick, Ron Funches, Todrick Hall, Cheryl Hines, Adrienne Bailon-Houghton"	January 17, 2024	Wednesday 8:00 p.m.	0.2	1.64	
4	"Decades Night: Adrienne Bailon-Houghton, Melissa Peterman, Frankie Muniz, Romeo Miller, Cheryl Hines"	January 24, 2024	Wednesday 8:00 p.m.	0.2	1.81	
5	"Sports Night: Montell Jordan, Dwight Howard, Jon Lovitz, Cheryl Hines, Adrienne Bailon-Houghton"	January 31, 2024	Wednesday 8:00 p.m.	0.3	1.65	
6	"Motown Night: Johnny Gill, Nene Leakes, Kate Flannery, Adrienne Bailon-Houghton, Cheryl Hines"	February 7, 2024	Wednesday 8:00 p.m.	0.2	1.52	
7	"Doppelganger Night: Guest host Joel McHale, Carnie Wilson, Maggie Lawson, Cheryl Hines, Adrienne Bailon-Houghton"	February 14, 2024	Wednesday 8:00 p.m.	0.2	1.56	
8	"Twinning Night: Guest host Joel McHale, Michelle Williams, Lisa Ann Walter, Adrienne Bailon-Houghton, Cheryl Hines"	February 21, 2024	Wednesday 8:00 p.m.	0.2	1.62	
9	"Elvis Night: Tyler Hilton, Jimmie Allen, Cheyenne Jackson, Adrienne Bailon-Houghton, Cheryl Hines"	May 16, 2024	Thursday 8:00 p.m.	0.2	1.08	
10	"Shawn Stockman, Ron Funches, Cheryl Hines, Adrienne Bailon-Houghton"	May 23, 2024	Thursday 8:00 p.m.	0.2	1.05	
11	"Country Night: Guest host Nick Cannon, Maddie & Tae, Finesse Mitchell, Cheryl Hines, Adrienne Bailon-Houghton"	May 30, 2024	Thursday 8:00 p.m.	0.2	1.44	
12	"Vegas Night: Guest host Nick Cannon, Chris Kirkpatrick, Porsha Williams, Penn Jilete, Adrienne Bailon-Houghton, Cheryl Hines"	June 6, 2024	Thursday 8:00 p.m.	0.2	1.42	
