= Robert Sampson =

Robert Sampson may refer to:

- Robert Sampson (disability rights activist) (1925–2006), American lawyer, United Airlines executive and disability rights activist
- Robert Sampson (actor) (1933–2020), American actor
- Robert Sampson (basketball) (born 1992), American basketball player
- Robert Sampson (politician) (born 1969), American politician
- Robert J. Sampson (born 1956), American sociologist

== See also ==
- Rob Sampson (born 1955), Canadian politician
- Robert Hampson (disambiguation)
