= I Can See Your Voice (American game show) season 1 =

Television game show season

I Can See Your Voice
- Season 1
- Starring: Adrienne Bailon-Houghton; Cheryl Hines
- Hosted by: Ken Jeong
- No. of episodes: 10

Release
- Original network: Fox
- Original release: September 23 – December 9, 2020

Season chronology
- Next → Season 2

The first season of the American television mystery music game show I Can See Your Voice premiered on Fox on September 23, 2020.

For this season, only one episode was completed before production was halted due to the COVID-19 pandemic; Fox would later resume with no audience under enhanced safety protocols in August 2020, becoming one of the network's first non-scripted programs to do so.

== Gameplay ==
=== Format ===
According to the original South Korean rules, the guest artist and contestant must attempt to eliminate bad singers during its game phase. At the final performance, the last remaining mystery singer is revealed as either good or bad by means of a duet between them and one of the guest artists.

The contestant must eliminate one mystery singer at the end of each round, receiving $10,000 if they eliminate a bad singer. At the end of the game, if the contestant decides to walk away, they will keep the money had won in previous rounds; if they decide to risk for the last remaining mystery singer, they win $100,000 if a singer is good, or lose their all winnings if a singer is bad.

=== Rounds ===
1. Lip Sync Challenge
  Six mystery singers are divided into two groups of trios, and each of them would have to perform lip sync individually.
2. Unlock my Life
  The guest artist and contestant are presented with a video package containing possible clues by one of the mystery singers of their choice.
3. Secret Studio
  The guest artist and contestant are presented with video from a recording session by one of the mystery singers of their choice, but pitch-shifted to obscure their actual vocals.
4. Interrogation
  The guest artist and contestant may ask questions to the remaining mystery singers. Good singers are required to give truthful responses, while the bad singers must lie.

== Episodes ==
=== Guest artists ===
Legend:
Good singer
Bad singer
— Contestant chose to risk the money.
— Contestant chose to walk away with the money.

Episode		Guest artist (Note: Players' notes: For the returning guest artists (who also include foreigners and former good singers), names are displayed in italics.; For the mixed groups, names who identified as bad singers are displayed in italics.)	Contestant	Mystery singers (In their respective numbers and aliases)					
#	Date	Guest artist	Contestant	Elimination order					Winner
#	Date	Guest artist	Contestant	Lip Sync Challenge		Unlock my Life	Secret Studio	Interrogation	Winner
1	September 23, 2020	Nick Lachey	Shannon Davis → $100,000	3. Jamie Hosmer; (Golfer)	5. Maurniece Gayles; (Counselor)	2. Blake Spears; (Football Player)	4. Callie Rader; (Mathlete)	6. Charity Farrell; (Rock Climber)	1. Telvin Lewis; (Stylist)
2	September 30, 2020	Jordin Sparks	Loretta Randles → $0	3. Nathan Berry; (Heartthrob)	4. Pennie Vincent; (G.I. Jane)	6. Courtney Govan; (Auditor)	1. Paula Ayotte; (Scuba Diver)	2. Samantha Irvin; (Flautist)	5. Ted Femrite; (Singing Server)
3	October 14, 2020	Nicole Scherzinger	Alex Miranda → $30,000	2. Howard Young; (Doctor)	6. Mario Bryant; (Supermarket Clerk)	4. Farah Mitha; (Yogi)	5. Connor Waldman; (Jock)	3. Heather DeLoach; (Bee Girl)	1. Angeline Cortez; (Biker)
4	October 28, 2020	Pat Monahan	Sahyli Fontalvo → $100,000	1. Julian Mendoza; (Knight)	4. Heather Youmans; (Tap Dancer)	6. Angel Bonilla; (Phlebotomist)	2. Asia Ifield; (Fashion Designer)	5. Erick Esteban; (Karaoke King)	3. Caleb Minter; (Chef)
5	November 4, 2020	Donny Osmond	Ross Bispo → $0	1. Jonathan Mouton; (Choir Director)	6. Katherine Reaves; (Librarian)	3. Elise Go; (Pop Princess)	2. Ama Konadu; (Record Label Executive)	4. Marcus Smith; (Mr. Security)	5. Jack Levic; (Ghost Hunter)
6	November 11, 2020	Jesse McCartney	Emily Odegard → $20,000	2. Angela Marie Hutchinson; (Poet)	5. Justin Kroehler; (Singer-Songwriter)	6. Danielle Coupet; (Boxer)	1. Jasmine Chacon; (Surfer)	4. Megan Tibbits; (Harpist)	3. Eric Michael Krop; (Broadway Belter)
7	November 18, 2020	Adrienne Bailon-Houghton	Heather Adair → $40,000	3. Mike Cali; (Wedding Singer)	5. Keith Newton; (Dr. Jazz)	2. Dahlya Mani Glick; (Flower Child)	1. Juliet Kang; (Taekwondo Instructor)	4. Vee Nelson; (Queen of Goth)	6. Vi Cespedes; (Tennis Champ)
8	November 26, 2020	Rick Springfield (Note: Season highlight: Foreign guest artist: Rick Springfield (AUS; ep. 8))	Tillman Robinson → $20,000	3. Courtney Moore; (Copycat Katy)	6. Heath Hensley; (Stuntman)	4. Erik Escobar; (Musical Bars)	1. Brieanna Grace; (Camp Counselor)	2. Krystle Simmons; (Cruise Ship Singer)	5. Candice Callins; (Gamer)
9	December 7, 2020	Robin Thicke	Stephen Reid → $0	2. Bailey Curbow; (Rocker)	6. Maeve Riley; (Lifeguard)	3. Cordy White; (Dancer)	5. James Calacsan; (Accountant)	4. Alex "Demetria Cherry" Vargas; (Vegas Showgirl)	1. Wrekless Watson; (Drummer)
10	December 9, 2020	Katharine McPhee	Delray Smith → $100,000	1. JC Zepeda; (Flight Attendant)	6. Kil Theodrick; (Air Force Veteran)	3. Lana Wohl; (Dance Director)	4. Travis Yee; (Cowboy)	2. Agina Alvarez; (La Voz)	5. Christine Ariya; (Customer Service Agent)

=== Panelists ===
Legend:
Regular panelist
Guest panelist

Apps		Panelists in attendance (Sorted by first appearance, with episode designations)
g#	p#	Panelists in attendance (Sorted by first appearance, with episode designations)
10	1	Cheryl Hines (1–10)
9	1	Adrienne Bailon-Houghton (1–6, 8–10)
2	6	Niecy Nash (2, 10); DeRay Davis (3, 8); Bob Saget (4–5); Yvette Nicole Brown (4, 6); Jeff Dye (7, 9); Joel McHale (7, 10)
1	9	Arsenio Hall and Kelly Osbourne (1); Jay Pharoah (2); Russell Peters (3); Finesse Mitchell (5); Robin Thicke (6); Deon Cole (7); Taye Diggs (8); Nicole Byer (9)

== Reception ==
Viewership and ratings per episode of I Can See Your Voice (American game show) season 1
No.	Title	Air date	Timeslot (ET)	Rating (18–49)	Viewers (millions)	DVR (18–49)	DVR viewers (millions)	Total (18–49)	Total viewers (millions)	Ref.
1	"Episode 1: Nick Lachey, Kelly Osbourne, Arsenio Hall, Cheryl Hines, Adrienne Houghton"	September 23, 2020	Wednesday 9:00 p.m.	1.2	4.56	0.3	1.07	1.5	5.63	
2	"Episode 2: Jordin Sparks, Niecy Nash, Jay Pharoah, Cheryl Hines, Adrienne Houghton"	September 30, 2020	Wednesday 9:00 p.m.	1.2	4.46	0.2	0.82	1.4	5.28	
3	"Episode 3: Nicole Scherzinger, DeRay Davis, Russell Peters, Cheryl Hines, Adrienne Houghton"	October 14, 2020	Wednesday 9:00 p.m.	1.1	4.06	—N/a	—N/a	—N/a	—N/a	
4	"Episode 4: Pat Monahan, Yvette Nicole Brown, Bob Saget, Cheryl Hines, Adrienne Houghton"	October 28, 2020	Wednesday 9:00 p.m.	1.0	3.65	0.3	0.79	1.3	4.44	
5	"Episode 5: Donny Osmond, Bob Saget, Finesse Mitchell, Cheryl Hines, Adrienne Houghton"	November 4, 2020	Wednesday 9:00 p.m.	1.1	4.38	0.2	0.95	1.3	5.33	
6	"Episode 6: Jesse McCartney, Yvette Nicole Brown, Robin Thicke, Cheryl Hines, Adrienne Houghton"	November 11, 2020	Wednesday 9:00 p.m.	0.9	3.45	0.2	0.92	1.2	4.37	
7	"Episode 7: Adrienne Houghton, Joel McHale, Deon Cole, Jeff Dye, Cheryl Hines"	November 18, 2020	Wednesday 9:00 p.m.	1.0	3.76	0.2	0.82	1.2	4.58	
8	"Episode 8: Rick Springfield, Taye Diggs, DeRay Davis, Cheryl Hines, Adrienne Houghton"	November 26, 2020	Thursday 9:00 p.m.	1.8	6.07	—N/a	—N/a	—N/a	—N/a	
9	"Episode 9: Robin Thicke, Nicole Byer, Jeff Dye, Cheryl Hines, Adrienne Houghton"	December 7, 2020	Monday 8:00 p.m.	0.8	2.51	—N/a	—N/a	—N/a	—N/a	
10	"Episode 10: Katharine McPhee, Joel McHale, Niecy Nash, Cheryl Hines, Adrienne Houghton"	December 9, 2020	Wednesday 9:00 p.m.	0.8	3.43	—N/a	—N/a	—N/a	—N/a	
