= I Can See Your Voice (American game show) season 2 =

Television game show season

I Can See Your Voice
- Season 2
- Starring: Adrienne Bailon-Houghton; Cheryl Hines
- Hosted by: Ken Jeong
- No. of episodes: Regular: 10; Special: 2; Overall: 12

Release
- Original network: Fox
- Original release: Regular season: January 5 – March 8, 2022; Specials: December 14, 2021; June 26, 2022

Season chronology
- ← Previous; Season 1 Next → Season 3

The second season of the American television mystery music game show I Can See Your Voice began airing on Fox with a holiday special on December 14, 2021, ahead of its proper season premiere on January 5, 2022.

== Gameplay ==
=== Format ===
According to the original South Korean rules, the guest artist and contestant must attempt to eliminate bad singers during its game phase. At the final performance, the last remaining mystery singer is revealed as either good or bad by means of a duet between them and one of the guest artists.

The contestant must eliminate one mystery singer at the end of each round, receiving $15,000 if they eliminate a bad singer. At the end of the game, if the contestant decides to walk away, they will keep the money had won in previous rounds; if they decide to risk for the last remaining mystery singer, they win $100,000 if a singer is good, or lose their all winnings if a singer is bad.

=== Rounds ===
1. Lip Sync Showdown
  Six mystery singers are divided into pairs, in which each compete a lip sync battle against each other.
  - Optionally, the contestant may use the Golden Mic once during the game, in which they may hear additional clues and observations from a celebrity guest off-stage.
2. Unlock my Life
  The guest artist and contestant are presented with a video package containing possible clues by one of the mystery singers of their choice.
  - A Day in the Life — The guest artist and contestant are presented with a video package chronicling the daily lives by one of the mystery singers.
  - Secret Snoop — The guest artist and contestant "tour" one of the mystery singer's homes for clues (which may include red herrings) for 60 seconds.
  - Super Fan — The guest artist and contestant are presented with a video package featuring a "super fan" by one of the mystery singers.
3. Interrogation
  The guest artist and contestant may ask questions to the remaining mystery singers. Good singers are required to give truthful responses, while the bad singers must lie.

== Episodes ==
=== Guest artists ===
Legend:
Good singer
Bad singer
— Contestant chose to risk the money.
— Contestant chose to walk away with the money.

Episode		Guest artist (Note: Players' notes: For the returning guest artists (who also include foreigners and former good singers), names are displayed in italics.; For the mixed groups, names who identified as bad singers are displayed in italics.)	Contestant	Mystery singers (In their respective numbers and aliases)					
#	Date	Guest artist	Contestant	Elimination order					Winner
#	Date	Guest artist	Contestant	Lip Sync Showdown			Unlock my Life	Interrogation	Winner
Special	December 14, 2021	Debbie Gibson	Bryce Morris → $30,000	4. Anastasia Bergman; (Ballerina)	1. KC Dela Cruz; (Christmas Elf)	2. Valerie Nunez; (Mariachi Performer)	5. Hayden Bebber; (Nutcracker)	6. Robert Trant; (Garbage Man)	3. David T. Holmes III; (Holiday 5K Runner)
1	January 5, 2022	Jewel	Millicent Fynn → $100,000	6. Luke Taylor; (Carpenter)	2. Brian Gastelum; (Banker)	3. Artis Grant; (Stepper)	1. Hong Gi-hae; (Water Polo Player)	4. Stephanie Hayes; (Mail Lady)	5. Heather Reicher; (Wrestling Announcer)
2	January 12, 2022	Jason Mraz	Jacquelyn Thomas → $60,000	4. J Rome; (Background Singer)	6. Kevin Braunschweig; (Hockey Player)	3. Carrie Turrubiartes; (Mariah Carey Impersonator)	2. Christine Lee; (Circus Performer)	5. Laina Sweetney; (UPS Driver)	1. Dennis Diaz; (Mixologist)
3	January 19, 2022	Kelly Rowland	Zac Feiden → $0	3. Keith Junior; (Choreographer)	1. Zelda Kimble; (Thespian)	6. Kaylee Johnson-Bradley; (Journalism Student)	2. Alisha Rome; (Track Star)	5. Paul Heredia; (Graphic Designer)	4. Christopher Hart; (Magician)
4	January 26, 2022	Ashanti	Kenny Sohn → $100,000	6. Jaclyn Silverman; (Barista)	4. Naomi Gomez; (Sign Spinner)	5. Rian Jones; (Janitor)	2. Joemari Felarca; (Student Council President)	3. Julie Kidd; (Palm Reader)	1. Mimi Sledge; (Ukulele Prodigy)
5	February 2, 2022	Macy Gray	Lauren Odom → $45,000	2. Alyssa Navarro; (Princess)	6. Nikko Lennon; (Takeout Driver)	1. Kyle Hudson; (Gym Teacher)	3. Alexander Krestin; (Butcher)	4. Melanie Mitchell; (Painter)	5. Kya Blake; (Deep Sea Diver)
6	February 9, 2022	LeAnn Rimes	Ric Vangalio → $30,000	2. Eugenia Kuzmina; (Runway Model)	1. Juliette Goglia; (Hollywood Starlet)	3. Ulysses Long; (Factory Worker)	4. Noybel Gorgoy; (Make-up Artist)	5. Gabrielle Vargas; (Blackjack Dealer)	6. Joe Daccache; (Dog Walker)
7	February 16, 2022	Rachel Platten	Frank Adams → $100,000	1. Charli Pierre; (Paralegal)	2. John Lehr; (Caveman)	6. Alikona Bradford; (Gymnast)	3. Franser Pazos; (Salsa King)	4. Nicole Whitlock; (Housewife)	5. DaQwaylan Dunbar; (Groundskeeper)
8	February 23, 2022	Shaggy (Note: Season highlight: Foreign guest artist: Shaggy (JAM; ep. 8))	Luan Do → $15,000	3. Issy Saadah; (Pharmacy Tech)	2. Arvell Grandberry; (Cafeteria Server)	5. Elisa Chavez; (Florist)	4. Greg West; (Jason Aldean Tribute Artist)	1. Angie Bullaro; (Softball Player)	6. Gabriel Schwartz; (Mountain Biker)
9	March 2, 2022	Wanya Morris	Myverick Garcia → $0	4. Gaba and Zoe D'Andrea; (TikTokers)	5. Cory and Calvin Boling; (Wrestlers)	3. J Valerione and Summer Greer; (Theme Park Workers)	2. Yana Berry and Briana Nixon; (Pop Duo)	6. Alyssa Anna and Lina Cab; (Skaters)	1. Steven and Briana Garcia; (Soccer Players)
10	March 8, 2022	Kandi Burruss	Elymagda Gonzalez → $100,000	2. Eric Anthony López; (Opera Singer)	4. Nidhi Kakulawaram; (Bollywood Dancer)	1. Dani Apple; (Waitress)	5. David Ruffin, Jr.; (Car Salesman)	3. Nancy Leonard; (Pageant Queen)	6. Cody Smith; (Baseball Coach)
Special	June 26, 2022	JoJo	Dr. Dossier Harps → $45,000	4. Bobby Black; (Photographer)	6. John Fitzsimmons; (Unicyclist)	5. Yi So-yeon; (Astronaut)	3. Mecca Hicks; (Matchmaker)	2. Cody Medler; (Singing Clown)	1. Brian Collura; (Bowler)

=== Panelists ===
Legend:
Regular panelist
Guest panelist
Golden Mic member

Apps		Panelists in attendance (Sorted by first appearance, with episode designations)
g#	p#	Panelists in attendance (Sorted by first appearance, with episode designations)
12	2	Adrienne Bailon-Houghton and Cheryl Hines (1–10; sp. 1–2)
2	2	Joel McHale (2, 4); Yvette Nicole Brown (9; sp. 2)
1	22	Paula Abdul and Nicole Byer (sp. 1); Bow Wow and Cheyenne Jackson (1); Lil Rel Howery (2); Brian Austin Green and Kelly Osbourne (3); Alison Brie (4); Loni Love and Jodie Sweetin (5); Mario Cantone and Melissa Peterman (6); Raven-Symoné and Robin Thicke (7); Margaret Cho and Rachael Harris (8); Curtis Stone (9); Jim Jefferies and Vanessa Lachey (10); Drew Carey (sp. 2)
1	12	Shaquille O'Neal (sp. 1); Kenan Thompson (1); Randall Park (2); J.B. Smoove (3); Dave Bautista (4); Erika Jayne (5); Triumph the Insult Comic Dog (6); Kenny G (7); Awkwafina (8); Johnny Weir (9); Carole Baskin (10); John Michael Higgins (sp. 2)

== Reception ==
Viewership and ratings per episode of I Can See Your Voice (American game show) season 2
No.	Title	Air date	Timeslot (ET)	Rating (18–49)	Viewers (millions)	DVR (18–49)	DVR viewers (millions)	Total (18–49)	Total viewers (millions)	Ref.
Special	"I Can See Your Voice Holiday Spectacular: Debbie Gibson, Nicole Byer, Paula Abdul, Cheryl Hines, Adrienne Houghton"	December 14, 2021	Tuesday 8:00 p.m.	0.3	1.81	0.0	0.26	0.4	2.07	(Note: Live+7 ratings were unavailable, so Live+3 ratings have been used instead.)
1	"Episode 1: Jewel, Bow Wow, Cheyenne Jackson, Cheryl Hines, Adrienne Houghton"	January 5, 2022	Wednesday 8:00 p.m.	0.4	2.28	0.1	0.37	0.5	2.65	
2	"Episode 2: Jason Mraz, Joel McHale, Lil Rel Howery, Cheryl Hines, Adrienne Houghton"	January 12, 2022	Wednesday 8:00 p.m.	0.5	2.28	—N/a	—N/a	—N/a	—N/a	
3	"Episode 3: Kelly Rowland, Kelly Osbourne, Brian Austin Green, Cheryl Hines, Adrienne Houghton"	January 19, 2022	Wednesday 8:00 p.m.	0.4	2.03	0.1	0.41	0.5	2.44	
4	"Episode 4: Ashanti, Joel McHale, Alison Brie, Cheryl Hines, Adrienne Houghton"	January 26, 2022	Wednesday 8:00 p.m.	0.4	2.12	0.1	0.38	0.5	2.50	
5	"Episode 5: Macy Gray, Loni Love, Jodie Sweetin, Cheryl Hines, Adrienne Houghton"	February 2, 2022	Wednesday 8:00 p.m.	0.4	2.43	—N/a	—N/a	—N/a	—N/a	
6	"Episode 6: LeAnn Rimes, Mario Cantone, Melissa Peterman, Cheryl Hines, Adrienne Houghton"	February 9, 2022	Wednesday 8:00 p.m.	0.4	1.92	—N/a	—N/a	—N/a	—N/a	
7	"Episode 7: Rachel Platten, Robin Thicke, Raven-Symoné, Cheryl Hines, Adrienne Houghton"	February 16, 2022	Wednesday 8:00 p.m.	0.4	2.07	—N/a	—N/a	—N/a	—N/a	
8	"Episode 8: Shaggy, Margaret Cho, Rachael Harris, Cheryl Hines, Adrienne Houghton"	February 23, 2022	Wednesday 8:00 p.m.	0.4	2.11	0.1	0.28	0.5	2.39	
9	"Episode 9: Wanya Morris, Yvette Nicole Brown, Curtis Stone, Cheryl Hines, Adrienne Houghton"	March 2, 2022	Wednesday 8:00 p.m.	0.4	2.03	0.1	0.37	0.5	2.40	
10	"Episode 10: Kandi Burruss, Vanessa Lachey, Jim Jefferies, Cheryl Hines, Adrienne Houghton"	March 8, 2022	Tuesday 9:00 p.m.	0.3	1.52	0.1	0.47	0.4	1.99	
Special	"Episode 11: Jojo, Drew Carey, Yvette Nicole Brown, Cheryl Hines, Adrienne Houghton"	June 26, 2022	Sunday 7:00 p.m.	0.1	0.80	—N/a	—N/a	—N/a	—N/a	
