= List of I Can See Your Voice (American game show) episodes =

Television game show episode list

About the series
- I Can See Your Voice is an American television music game show produced by Fox Alternative Entertainment and broadcast by Fox, featuring its format based on the South Korean program of the same title.
- More about the series

Episodes overview
- Total episode(s): 34
- Aired episode(s): 32
- Special episode(s): 2

The American television music game show I Can See Your Voice has played a total of three seasons and 34 episodes; broadcasting on Fox from September 23, 2020 to June 6, 2024.

== Series overview ==
Season	Episodes		Originally released	
Season	Episodes		First released	Last released
1	10		September 23, 2020	December 9, 2020
2	10		January 5, 2022	March 8, 2022
3	12	8	January 3, 2024 (Note: The 3rd season formally began airing the 1st part on this date, instead of its initial premiere scheduled for September 19, 2023 (which was later occupied by replays of 9-1-1: Lone Star amid the Hollywood labor disputes), followed by a 2nd part that resumed on May 16, 2024.)	February 21, 2024
3	12	4	May 16, 2024	June 6, 2024
Sp	2		December 14, 2021	June 26, 2022

== Episodes ==
=== Season 1 (2020) ===
List of season 1 episodes
No. overall	No. in season	Title	Original release date	Prod. code	U.S. viewers (millions)
1	1	"Episode 1: Nick Lachey, Kelly Osbourne, Arsenio Hall, Cheryl Hines, Adrienne Bailon-Houghton"	September 23, 2020	VOI-108	4.56
2	2	"Episode 2: Jordin Sparks, Niecy Nash, Jay Pharoah, Cheryl Hines, Adrienne Bailon-Houghton"	September 30, 2020	VOI-104	4.46
3	3	"Episode 3: Nicole Scherzinger, DeRay Davis, Russell Peters, Cheryl Hines, Adrienne Bailon-Houghton"	October 14, 2020	VOI-109	4.06
4	4	"Episode 4: Pat Monahan, Yvette Nicole Brown, Bob Saget, Cheryl Hines, Adrienne Bailon-Houghton"	October 28, 2020	VOI-105	3.65
5	5	"Episode 5: Donny Osmond, Bob Saget, Finesse Mitchell, Cheryl Hines, Adrienne Bailon-Houghton"	November 4, 2020	VOI-103	4.38
6	6	"Episode 6: Jesse McCartney, Yvette Nicole Brown, Robin Thicke, Cheryl Hines, Adrienne Bailon-Houghton"	November 11, 2020	VOI-110	3.45
7	7	"Episode 7: Adrienne Bailon-Houghton, Joel McHale, Deon Cole, Jeff Dye, Cheryl Hines"	November 18, 2020	VOI-101	3.76
8	8	"Episode 8: Rick Springfield, (Note: Foreign guest artists: Australia — Rick Springfield; Jamaica — Shaggy) Taye Diggs, DeRay Davis, Cheryl Hines, Adrienne Bailon-Houghton"	November 26, 2020	VOI-106	6.07
9	9	"Episode 9: Robin Thicke, Nicole Byer, Jeff Dye, Cheryl Hines, Adrienne Bailon-Houghton"	December 7, 2020	VOI-107	2.51
10	10	"Episode 10: Katharine McPhee, Joel McHale, Niecy Nash, Cheryl Hines, Adrienne Bailon-Houghton"	December 9, 2020	VOI-102	3.43

=== Season 2 (2022) ===
List of season 2 episodes
No. overall	No. in season	Title	Original release date	Prod. code	U.S. viewers (millions)
11	1	"Episode 1: Jewel, Bow Wow, Cheyenne Jackson, Cheryl Hines, Adrienne Bailon-Houghton"	January 5, 2022	VOI-204	2.28
12	2	"Episode 2: Jason Mraz, Joel McHale, Lil Rel Howery, Cheryl Hines, Adrienne Bailon-Houghton"	January 12, 2022	VOI-201	2.28
13	3	"Episode 3: Kelly Rowland, Kelly Osbourne, Brian Austin Green, Cheryl Hines, Adrienne Bailon-Houghton"	January 19, 2022	VOI-207	2.03
14	4	"Episode 4: Ashanti, Joel McHale, Alison Brie, Cheryl Hines, Adrienne Bailon-Houghton"	January 26, 2022	VOI-202	2.12
15	5	"Episode 5: Macy Gray, Loni Love, Jodie Sweetin, Cheryl Hines, Adrienne Bailon-Houghton"	February 2, 2022	VOI-205	2.43
16	6	"Episode 6: LeAnn Rimes, Mario Cantone, Melissa Peterman, Cheryl Hines, Adrienne Bailon-Houghton"	February 9, 2022	VOI-203	1.92
17	7	"Episode 7: Rachel Platten, Robin Thicke, Raven-Symoné, Cheryl Hines, Adrienne Bailon-Houghton"	February 16, 2022	VOI-206	2.07
18	8	"Episode 8: Shaggy, Margaret Cho, Rachael Harris, Cheryl Hines, Adrienne Bailon-Houghton"	February 23, 2022	VOI-209	2.11
19	9	"Episode 9: Wanya Morris, Yvette Nicole Brown, Curtis Stone, Cheryl Hines, Adrienne Bailon-Houghton"	March 2, 2022	VOI-211	2.03
20	10	"Episode 10: Kandi Burruss, Vanessa Lachey, Jim Jefferies, Cheryl Hines, Adrienne Bailon-Houghton"	March 8, 2022	VOI-208	1.52

=== Season 3 (2024) ===
List of season 3 episodes
No. overall	No. in season	Title	Original release date	Prod. code	U.S. viewers (millions)
Part 1
21	1	"Premiere: Lauren Alaina, Nikki Glaser, DeRay Davis, Cheryl Hines, Adrienne Bailon-Houghton"	January 3, 2024	VOI-302	2.11
22	2	"Queen Night: Gavin DeGraw, Thomas Lennon, Jennie Garth, Adrienne Bailon-Houghton, Cheryl Hines"	January 10, 2024	VOI-307	1.89
23	3	"Divas Night: Dionne Warwick, Ron Funches, Todrick Hall, Cheryl Hines, Adrienne Bailon-Houghton"	January 17, 2024	VOI-306	1.64
24	4	"Decades Night: Adrienne Bailon-Houghton, Melissa Peterman, Frankie Muniz, Romeo Miller, Cheryl Hines"	January 24, 2024	VOI-304	1.81
25	5	"Sports Night: Montell Jordan, Dwight Howard, Jon Lovitz, Cheryl Hines, Adrienne Bailon-Houghton"	January 31, 2024	VOI-303	1.65
26	6	"Motown Night: Johnny Gill, NeNe Leakes, Kate Flannery, Adrienne Bailon-Houghton, Cheryl Hines"	February 7, 2024	VOI-301	1.52
27	7	"Doppelganger Night: Guest host Joel McHale, Carnie Wilson, Maggie Lawson, Cheryl Hines, Adrienne Bailon-Houghton"	February 14, 2024	VOI-309	1.56
28	8	"Twinning Night: Guest host Joel McHale, Michelle Williams, Lisa Ann Walter, Adrienne Bailon-Houghton, Cheryl Hines"	February 21, 2024	VOI-310	1.62
Part 2
29	9	"Elvis Night: Tyler Hilton, Jimmie Allen, Cheyenne Jackson, Adrienne Bailon-Houghton, Cheryl Hines"	May 16, 2024	VOI-308	1.08
30	10	"Episode 10: Shawn Stockman, Ron Funches, Cheryl Hines, Adrienne Bailon-Houghton"	May 23, 2024	VOI-305	1.05
31	11	"Country Night: Guest host Nick Cannon, Maddie & Tae, Finesse Mitchell, Cheryl Hines, Adrienne Bailon-Houghton"	May 30, 2024	VOI-312	1.44
32	12	"Vegas Night: Guest host Nick Cannon, Chris Kirkpatrick, Porsha Williams, Penn Jillette, Adrienne Bailon-Houghton, Cheryl Hines"	June 6, 2024	VOI-311	1.42

== Specials ==
List of special episodes
No.	Title	Original release date	Prod. code	U.S. viewers (millions)
1	"I Can See Your Voice Holiday Spectacular: Debbie Gibson, Nicole Byer, Paula Abdul, Cheryl Hines, Adrienne Bailon-Houghton"	December 14, 2021	VOI-212	1.81
2	"Episode 11: Jojo, Drew Carey, Yvette Nicole Brown, Cheryl Hines, Adrienne Bailon-Houghton"	June 26, 2022	VOI-210	0.80
