= We Are Family (TV series) =

American television game show

- Genre: Game show
- Directed by: Ashley S. Gorman
- Presented by: Anthony Anderson; Doris Bowman; Joel McHale (guest host; eps 9–10)
- Theme music composer: Drew Bayers
- Country of origin: United States
- Original language: English
- No. of seasons: 1
- No. of episodes: 10

Production
- Executive producers: Jeff Apploff; Joni Day; Jamie Foxx; Matilda Zoltowski
- Production location: Atlanta
- Editors: Andrew Selzer; Emmanuel Stratford; Richard Waters
- Camera setup: Multi-camera
- Production companies: BiggerStage; Fox Alternative Entertainment; Apploff Entertainment

Original release
- Network: Fox
- Release: January 3 – February 28, 2024

We Are Family is an American game show that premiered on January 3, 2024 on Fox. Hosted by Anthony Anderson and his mother Doris Bowman, the show featured three unknown singers, each performing in one round, and a celebrity relative to each singer who is hidden until the end of their round.

== Format ==
During each one-hour episode, three performers sing for a studio audience consisting of 100 contestants who stand at individually-named desks attempting to guess what famous celebrity the performer is related to. Over the course of three rounds, contestants have several opportunities to win various amounts of cash, with the maximum possible shared prize winnings totaling $150,000 per episode. The same 100 contestants carry throughout the season, returning for each new episode.

The first two performers each sing two songs; one solo followed by one duet with their famous relative. The third and final performer of each episode does not sing solo, only singing the duet with their relative. Performers are visible on the stage and give a brief bio of themselves before singing, while the famous relative is concealed within "the sphere", a large half-circle in the middle of the set. The celebrity relatives are obscured using various lighting techniques. Brief glimpses of the celebrity are shown only in silhouette form. During the performer's intro, contestants need to listen carefully in the event that they might give some verbal clues to their celebrity relative's identity.

Prize money for the first round is $20,000 and is split among all contestants who correctly guess the celebrity relative. During round one, three clues to the celebrity identity are displayed on the sphere during the solo performance, and three more clues are shown during the duet, for a total of six clues. During each song, contestants lock in their guesses on a tablet at their station. The speed with which they lock in correct answers determines their possible eligibility to participate in the third round. After each song is performed, the host polls randomly-selected contestants regarding who they guessed as the celebrity and why. After the contestant interviews are complete, the performer and their celebrity relative begin the same duet again, this time for the reveal. After the first couple of lines of the song, the singing stops, but the music continues as the two halves of the sphere start to open. With smoke obscuring their identity, the celebrity gradually comes forward on the stage to reveal who they are. The duet then finishes with both performer and celebrity relative now visible. The host speaks with the pair briefly before they exit the stage together. Once the pair have left the stage, the host reveals how many of the 100 contestants correctly guessed the identity of the celebrity relative, and therefore split the $20,000 prize for round one.

Prize money for the second round is raised to $30,000 and is once again split among all contestants who correctly guess the celebrity relative of the second performer. The format for round two is identical to round one.

After the first two rounds, the host reveals how many contestants correctly guessed both the first and second celebrity relatives, qualifying them for a chance to be the single "Star Player" who will guess in the third round. Out of the group of contestants eligible for round three, the person with the fastest times guessing correctly in rounds one and two earns the position of Star Player for round three. Only the Star Player can guess during round three and compete for the round three prize winnings. Once a contestant has been selected as Star Player, they are ineligible to be the Star Player again in future episodes.

Prize money for the third round is raised to $100,000. During round three, the performer skips the solo song, and only performs a duet with their celebrity relative. During the duet, five clues to the celebrity's identity are displayed on the sphere. The possible winnings in round three for the Star Player are determined by when they lock in their guess, and whether or not they are correct. An incorrect guess results in no prize money from round three, but they do keep their winnings from the first two rounds. In the event of a correct guess of the celebrity's identity, the round three prize money is awarded as follows: $100,000 if guessed after the first clue, $75,000 if guessed after the second clue, $50,000 if guessed after the third clue, $25,000 if guessed after the fourth clue, and $10,000 if guessed after the fifth and final clue.

== Weeks ==
=== Week 1 (January 3) ===
Performances in the first episode
Name	Solo Song	Duet Song	Celebrity Relative
Evandia Penix	"The Greatest Love of All" (Whitney Houston)	"Stronger (What Doesn't Kill You)" (Kelly Clarkson)	Michelle Williams (cousin)
Audrey Brown	"Valerie" (Amy Winehouse)	"It's Still Rock and Roll to Me" (Billy Joel)	Joel McHale (cousin)
Edward J. (E.J.) Glaser	N/A	"How Sweet It Is (To Be Loved by You)" (Marvin Gaye)	Nikki Glaser (daughter)

Highlighted Contestants
Name	Hometown	Occupation	Strategy
Jawane Martin	Marietta, GA	Customer Service Manager	"My strategy is to not only pay attention to the given clues, but pay attention to everything that goes on on that stage because everything can be a clue to win this game."
Charlie Semar	Chicago, IL	Sports Statistician	"Well, when she said Cubs fan, I’ve seen him at games all the time, I went with Bill Murray!"
Adam Sanderson (STAR PLAYER)	Camarillo, CA	Ballroom Dance Instructor	"I like to listen, unlike my ex-boyfriends. On the side of being a bartender and ballroom dance instructor, I am an avid casino poker player so I'm used to taking risks."

=== Week 2 ===
==== Night 1 (January 10) ====
Performances in the second episode
Name	Solo Song	Duet Song	Celebrity Relative
Jaelyn Kay	"I Wanna Dance with Somebody (Who Loves Me)" (Whitney Houston)	"Born This Way" (Lady Gaga)	JoJo Siwa (cousin)
Lola Sofia Bonfiglio	"Wouldn't It Be Nice" (The Beach Boys)	"California Dreamin'" (The Mamas & the Papas)	Carnie Wilson (mother)
Caylin Newton	N/A	"We Will Rock You" (Queen)	Cam Newton (brother)

Highlighted Contestants
Name	Hometown	Occupation	Strategy
Maria Boyancé	Atlanta, GA	Business Consultant	"Since I'm a true Millennial, I'm always on Instagram looking at all the gossip blog posts and everything, so I'm hoping to take my knowledge from there, use it with the clues to figure out what celebrity is behind the sphere, and all around."
Scott Kirschman (STAR PLAYER)	Columbus, OH	Retired Prosecutor	N/A

==== Night 2 (January 14) ====
Performances in the third episode
Name	Solo Song	Duet Song	Celebrity Relative
Kenzie Bausmith	"Un-Break My Heart" (Toni Braxton)	"Hot Stuff" (Donna Summer)	Candace Cameron Bure (cousin)
Tyler Suddeth	"Country Girl (Shake It for Me)" (Luke Bryan)	"Midnight Train to Georgia" (Gladys Knight & the Pips)	Lauren Alaina (sister)
Shaina Farrow	N/A	"I Want It That Way" (Backstreet Boys)	Jay Pharoah (brother)

Highlighted Contestants
Name	Hometown	Occupation	Strategy
Tim Sternberg	Plantation, FL	Education Advocate	“I host a daily trivia show on social media and I am going to dig into the crevices of my mind to find the right answers!”
Chelsea Kline (STAR PLAYER)	Chicago, IL	Public Health Worker	N/A

=== Week 3 (January 17) ===
Performances in the fourth episode
Name	Solo Song	Duet Song	Celebrity Relative
Mary English	"Last Dance" (Donna Summer)	"I Will Survive" (Gloria Gaynor)	Tiffany Haddish (niece)
Nick Gibson	"Dreams" (The Cranberries)	"Last Friday Night (T.G.I.F.)" (Katy Perry)	Debbie Gibson (aunt)
Michael Conrad Braxton Jr.	N/A	"Lean on Me" (Bill Withers)	Tamar Braxton (sister)

Highlighted Contestants
Name	Hometown	Occupation	Strategy
Jenna DiCostanzo	Long Island, NY	Lawyer	"As an attorney, I have to look at evidence every day, so while I'm looking at these clues, I'm looking at them to see if I can find the truth: who is it behind that sphere?"
Jason Walker (STAR PLAYER)	Akron, OH	Pastor	"My strategy is to watch the players. I feel like everyone's got a tell. You gotta kind of move around with that, see what they're thinking."

=== Week 4 (January 24) ===
Performances in the fifth episode
Name	Solo Song	Duet Song	Celebrity Relative
Sharmaine Stowes	"Respect" (Aretha Franklin)	"24K Magic" (Bruno Mars)	Terrell Owens (brother)
Rock Richard Monahan	"One Call Away" (Charlie Puth)	"I Don't Want to Miss a Thing" (Aerosmith)	Pat Monahan (father)
Sophia Umansky	N/A	"Love You like a Love Song" (Selena Gomez)	Kyle Richards (mother)

Highlighted Contestants
Name	Hometown	Occupation	Strategy
Cody Latimer	Steubenville, OH	Academic Advisor	"In my free time, I play in a band and sing. So I'm really listening to how the celebrity and their relative duet together."
Hannah Neuman	Colorado Springs, CO	Pop Culture Influencer	"I'm a Pop Culture Influencer, and my niche is actually 'Deep Dives' so I'm constantly filling up entire notebooks of research on celebrities's scandals, breakups, makeups and more. So, I'm just going to trust my gut. This stuff just kind of lives in my head rent free, as it is already."
Tyler Woodbridge (STAR PLAYER)	Columbus, OH	Server	N/A

=== Week 5 (January 31) ===
Performances in the sixth episode
Name	Solo Song	Duet Song	Celebrity Relative
Red Grammer	"I Can See Clearly Now" (Johnny Nash)	"Humble and Kind" (Tim McGraw)	Andy Grammer (son)
Julian Frampton	"Rebel Rebel" (David Bowie)	"Black Hole Sun" (Soundgarden)	Peter Frampton (father)
Bella Polizzi	N/A	"I Love It" (Icona Pop feat. Charli XCX)	Snooki (aunt)

Highlighted Contestants
Name	Hometown	Occupation	Strategy
Miles Triplett	Powder Springs, GA	Delivery Driver	"I am a delivery driver, so my job is to be fast with everything I do. So whatever comes to mind, I will put into this tablet, and that will be the right answer."
Ashlee Gillum	Detroit, MI	Custom Nail Artist	"Well I'm gonna make sure that I pay attention to the details, because I do custom press on nails, and I'm also going to make sure I use the clues, and you know, just nail it."
Alexandra Burris (STAR PLAYER)	Atlanta, GA	Stay at Home Mom	N/A

=== Week 6 (February 14) ===
Performances in the seventh episode
Name	Solo Song	Duet Song	Celebrity Relative
Janine Fatone-Butler	"Oops!... I Did It Again" (Britney Spears)	"Walking on Sunshine" (Katrina and the Waves)	Joey Fatone (brother)
Kayla Brianna Smith	"Use Somebody" (Kings of Leon)	"Airplanes" (B.o.B feat. Hayley Williams)	Kenny Smith (father)
Jason "JD" Morgan	N/A	"Friends in Low Places" (Garth Brooks)	Sarah Palin (cousin)

Highlighted Contestants
Name	Hometown	Occupation	Strategy
Carolina Sofía Quixano	Guaynabo, PR	Dog Walker	"I think that I'm gonna be able to pick up on mannerisms. I feel like family members tend to have the same mannerisms. Like me just gesturing like this? Everyone in my family does that. Ya know what I'm sayin'?"
Cohen Robinson (STAR PLAYER)	Lakeland, FL	House Cleaning Entrepreneur	N/A

=== Week 7 (February 21) ===
Performances in the eighth episode
Name	Solo Song	Duet Song	Celebrity Relative
Dominic Nash	"Uptown Funk" (Mark Ronson feat. Bruno Mars)	"Can You Stand the Rain" (New Edition)	Niecy Nash-Betts (mother)
Jacquelyn Howard	"For Once in My Life" (Stevie Wonder)	"Hound Dog" (Elvis Presley)	Dwight Howard (nephew)
Ayoub Kharbouch	N/A	"Ready or Not" (Fugees)	French Montana (brother)

Highlighted Contestants
Name	Hometown	Occupation	Strategy
Kenny North (STAR PLAYER)	Washington, DC	Hotel Manager	"Well I play trivia just about twice a week when I'm back home at one of my favorite bars -- what's up everybody! I'm just kind of used to answering questions, like, quickly. I let the game kind of like come to me though, so."
Brooke Westlake	Reno, NV	Cannabis Expo CEO	"Four years ago, I took a chance on myself and I started my own company. My mission statement for the company is "connect, inspire, and learn" and so it's all about connecting with who's on stage, and then learning all the clues, and dialing in what my guess is."

=== Week 8 (February 28) ===
==== Part 1 ====
Performances in the ninth episode
Name	Solo Song	Duet Song	Celebrity Relative
Jean Rodríguez	"So Sick" (Ne-Yo)	"Stand by Me" (Ben E. King)	Luis Fonsi (brother)
Prima Apollinaare	"Will You Love Me Tomorrow" (The Shirelles)	"Islands in the Stream" (Dolly Parton & Kenny Rogers)	Dermot Mulroney (husband)
Guinevere Liddell	N/A	"Eye of the Tiger" (Survivor)	Chuck Liddell (father)

Highlighted Contestants
Name	Hometown	Occupation	Strategy
Audrey Furtado	San Diego, CA	College Student	"Well, I'm a full time student, actually, so I'm very used to takng tests like every single week. So I feel like in this game, I'm studying the clues as they're popping up, so I'm ready."
Madeline Schneider (STAR PLAYER)	Brooklyn, NY	Accountant	"Well, because I'm a New Yorker, I'm a classic overthinker. So my strategy really is to go with my first instinct, listen to what's going on, who's singing, and don't try to overthink it."

==== Part 2 ====
Performances in the tenth episode
Name	Solo Song	Duet Song	Celebrity Relative
Egypt Jahnari Criss	"And I Am Telling You I'm Not Going" (Jennifer Holliday)	"Lady Marmalade" (Labelle)	Sandra "Pepa" Denton (mother)
Mackenzie Lee Hart	"I Put a Spell on You" (Screamin' Jay Hawkins)	"(You Drive Me) Crazy" (Britney Spears)	Melissa Joan Hart (half-sister)
Olivia Van Der Beek	N/A	"I Hope You Dance" (Lee Ann Womack)	James Van Der Beek (father)

Highlighted Contestants
Name	Hometown	Occupation	Strategy
Stephan Sharenko	Atlanta, GA	Credit Card Sales Processor	"So I'm in sales, so all competitive sales people spend their time observing. So I'mma pay attention to the music, the clues on that majestic sphere, anything you say to the relatives that pop up here -- and because I have that competitive spirit, these fine folks and this game: they're all going down!"
Noah Bender	Foster City, CA	Kids Birthday Party Character	"I am a maticulous consumer of media. You know, I actually have a list called "Everything I've Ever Seen Ever." So I'm trying to pull from that list and see if I recognize who's up there, because I've seen a lot, let me tell ya."
Ivani Bing (STAR PLAYER)	Kansas City, MO	Radio Personality	N/A

== Production ==
On May 15, 2023, it was announced that Fox had ordered the series, with Jamie Foxx and Corinne Foxx as the hosts. Jamie Foxx also serves as the executive producer. On November 10, 2023, it was announced that Anthony Anderson and Doris Bowman would replace Jamie Foxx and Corinne Foxx as the hosts. It was also announced that the series would premiere on January 3, 2024, following the third season premiere of I Can See Your Voice.

== Episodes ==
No.	Title	Original release date	Prod. code	U.S. viewers (millions)	Rating/share (18-49)
1	"Family Reunion"	January 3, 2024	WFA-107	2.48	0.35/4
2	"Who's Your Mama?"	January 10, 2024	WFA-103	1.85	0.21/2
3	"Oh Brother!"	January 14, 2024	WFA-110	4.70	1.17/8
4	"It's All Relative"	January 17, 2024	WFA-108	1.81	0.29/3
5	"Who's Your Daddy?"	January 24, 2024	WFA-104	1.78	0.22/2
6	"A Family Affair"	January 31, 2024	WFA-109	1.64	0.25/3
7	"Sister Act"	February 14, 2024	WFA-102	1.48	0.18/2
8	"Hey Mama!"	February 21, 2024	WFA-101	1.63	0.20/2
9	"Family Man"	February 28, 2024	WFA-106	1.42	0.21/2
10	"Thicker Than Water"	February 28, 2024	WFA-105	1.42	0.21/2
