= Vittel =

- Commune
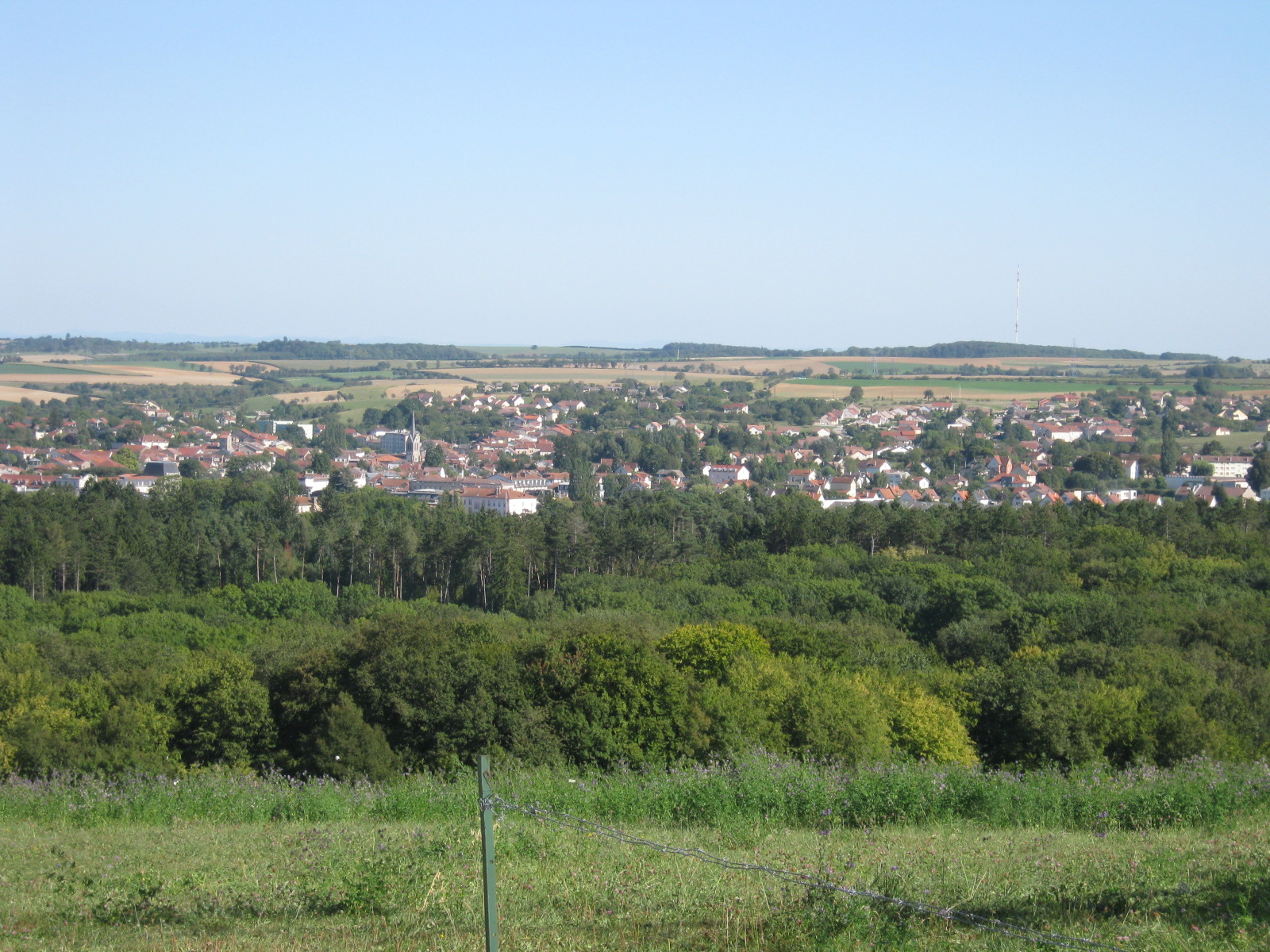
- General view of the town

- Coat of arms
- Location of Vittel
- Location within France Location within Grand Est
- Coordinates: 48°12′09″N 5°57′01″E
- Country: France
- Region: Grand Est
- Department: Vosges
- Arrondissement: Neufchâteau
- Canton: Vittel
- Intercommunality: Terre d'eau

Government
  - Mayor (2020–2026): Franck Perry
- Area^{1}: 24.13 km^{2} (9.32 sq mi)
- Elevation: 335 m (1,099 ft)
- Highest elevation: 457 m (1,499 ft)
- Lowest elevation: 322 m (1,056 ft)
- Population (2023): 4,780
  - Density: 198/km^{2} (513/sq mi)
- Time zone: UTC+01:00 (CET)
  - Summer (DST): UTC+02:00 (CEST)
- INSEE/Postal code: 88516 /88800
- ^{1} French Land Register data, which excludes lakes, ponds, glaciers > 1 km^{2} (0.386 sq mi or 247 acres) and river estuaries.

Vittel (French pronunciation: [vitɛl]; archaic German: Wittel) is a spa town in the Vosges department in Grand Est in northeastern France.

Mineral water is bottled and sold here by Nestlé Waters France, under the Vittel brand. A series of negotiations involving Nestlé, local agricultural smallholders, and the French national agricultural research institute to protect groundwater quality from nonpoint source pollution yielded a unique arrangement that is often cited as a case study in payment for ecosystem services based on Coasean bargaining.

== History ==
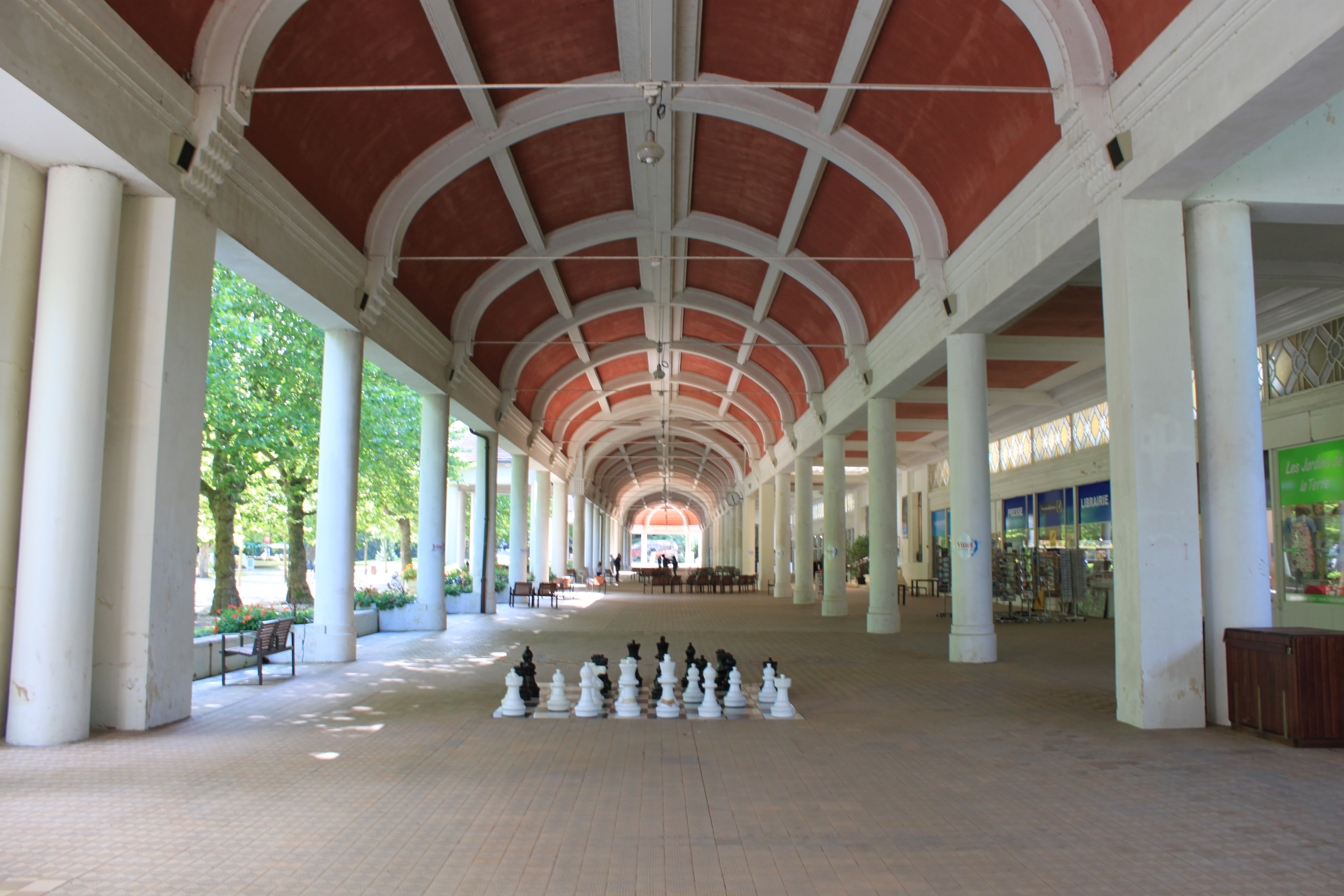
Thermes de Vittel: la Grande Galerie.

In 1854, after visiting the baths at nearby Contrexéville, lawyer Louis Bouloumié purchased the Fontaine de Gérémoy, site of the modern-day town of Vittel. Two years later, Bouloumie built a pavilion from which developed the grand, luxurious architecture which characterises the site. The town was also a recognized spa, bottling and exporting its waters.

In 1968, the Club Med was opened.

=== World War I ===
Home to U.S. Army Base Hospital 36 from Detroit, MI, from November 1917 until February 1919. This unit was formed at the Detroit College of Medicine and Surgery now Wayne State University, School of Medicine. They occupied the five resort hotels in the city plus the casino.

=== World War II ===
During the Battle of France in the summer of 1944, a small grass airstrip north of the town was used for light liaison aircraft by the United States Army Air Forces. The Twelfth Air Force headquartered several fighter wings in Vittel during their drive east into Germany. In 1945, that flat, grassy area of land (now a racetrack for horses) was used as a holding area for captured Luftwaffe aircraft before their shipment to the United Kingdom and the United States for evaluation (Operation Lusty).

Vittel served as an internment camp for enemy aliens of the German Reich during World War II. Hundreds of American and British families were interned there from September 1942. A few hundred Jewish people and citizens of German enemies, such as Gertrude O'Brady, were also sent there by the Germans who hoped to use them to exchange for German prisoners or nationals held elsewhere. Most of Vittel's Jewish detainees were deported to Auschwitz and murdered there in 1944. The order of Catholic nuns, Soeurs du Saint Esprit, were charged with looking after Jewish girls who were interned there.

The town was liberated by the US Army on September 10, 1944. In October 1944, the Hotel Continental was then used as part of U. S. Army Base Hospital Number 23.

== Population ==
Historical population
Year	Pop.	±% p.a.
1968	6,343	—
1975	6,791	+0.98%
1982	6,440	−0.76%
1990	6,296	−0.28%
1999	6,117	−0.32%
2007	5,586	−1.13%
2012	5,318	−0.98%
2017	5,071	−0.95%
2023	4,780	−0.98%
Source: INSEE

== Mayors ==
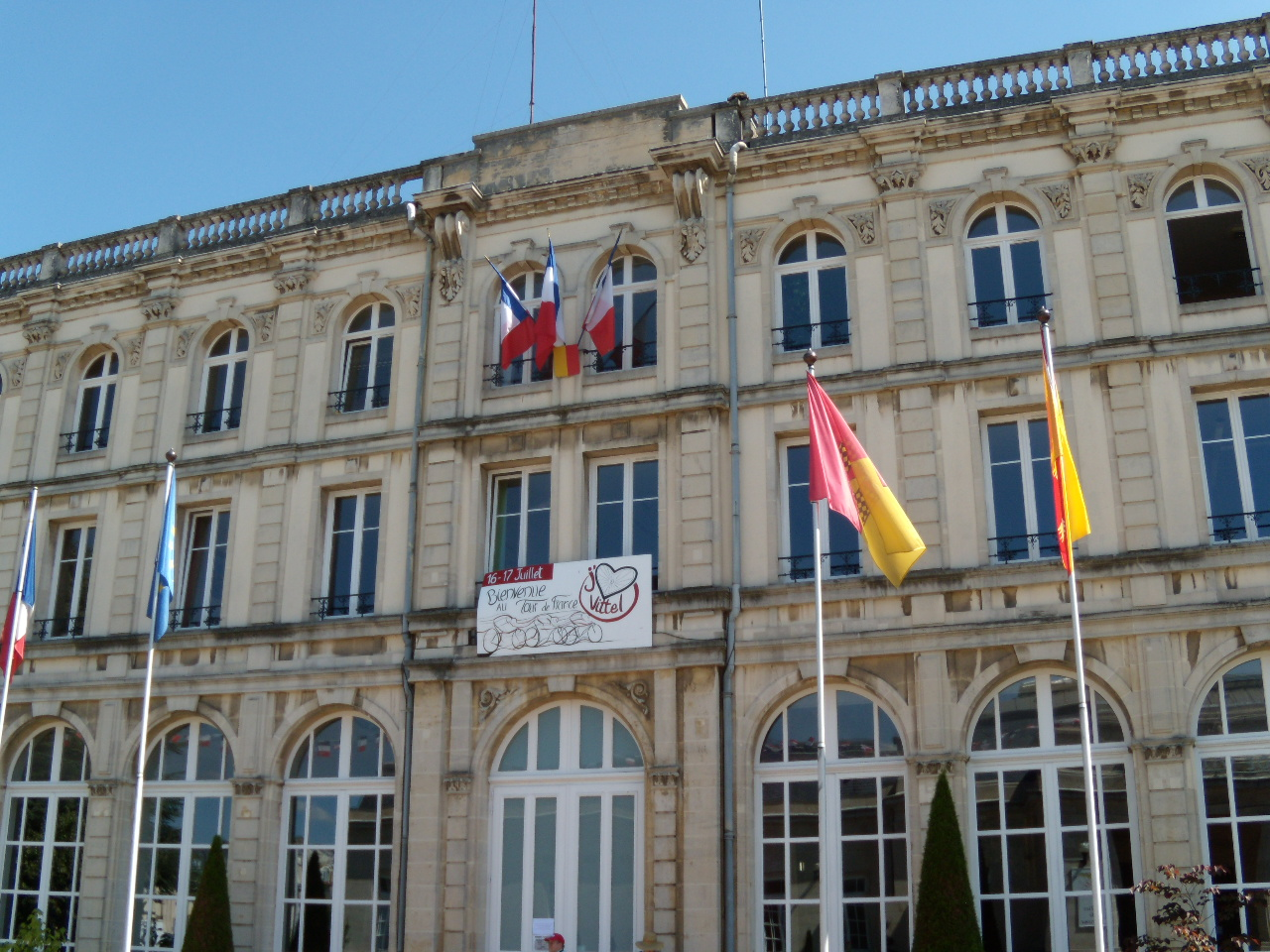
Hôtel de Ville (City Hall) of Vittel during the 2009 Tour de France.

Start	End	Name
1882	1903	Ambroise Bouloumié
1903	1919	Henri Gérard
1919	1945	Jean Bouloumié
1945	1947	André Gérard
1947	1952	Charles Villeminot
1952	1953	André Gérard
1953	1977	Guy de la Motte-Bouloumié
1977	1995	Hubert Voilquin
1995	2001	Guy de la Motte-Bouloumié
2001	2017	Jean-Claude Millot
2017	2026	Franck Perry

== Sport and leisure ==
Vittel is home to the Hippodrome de Vittel, a horse racing venue opened in 1904 and used for trotting, flat and jump racing.

== See also ==
- Communes of the Vosges department
