= Robert Hampson (disambiguation) =

Robert Hampson (born 1965) is an English musician and composer

Robert Hampson may also refer to:

- Robert Gavin Hampson (born 1948), British poet and academic
- Robert Hampson (sheriff) (1537–1607), sheriff of the City of London

== See also ==
- Robert Sampson (disambiguation)
