= Serious Moonlight (2009 film) =

2009 film by Cheryl Hines

- Theatrical film poster
- Directed by: Cheryl Hines
- Written by: Adrienne Shelly
- Produced by: Todd Stein; Isabel Rose; Andy Ostroy; Michael Roiff
- Starring: Meg Ryan; Timothy Hutton; Kristen Bell; Justin Long
- Cinematography: Nancy Schreiber
- Edited by: Steve Rasch
- Music by: Andrew Hollander
- Distributed by: Magnolia Pictures
- Release date: December 4, 2009 (US)
- Running time: 84 minutes
- Country: United States
- Language: English
- Box office: $138,696 (Worldwide)

Serious Moonlight is a 2009 American black comedy film directed by Cheryl Hines and starring Meg Ryan, Timothy Hutton, Kristen Bell, and Justin Long. It was released by Magnolia Pictures on 4 December 2009.

== Plot ==
When Louise, a high-powered Chicago attorney (Meg Ryan), discovers that her husband Ian (Timothy Hutton) is about to leave her for another woman named Sara (Kristen Bell), she prevents him from doing so by binding him to a chair with duct tape. She tries to persuade and convince him that he still loves her, but everything she says fails to change his mind. He lies and promises that he still loves her and will not run away when she frees him. When he tries to escape, she knocks him out with a flowerpot and tapes him to a toilet. She then leaves the house to purchase groceries to make a "romantic meal".

While Louise is out, a lawn-service boy named Todd (Justin Long) comes by to mow the lawn, and Ian successfully yells for help and gets his attention. The boy, realizing that no one else is in the house, begins robbing it. When Louise returns, the burglar attacks her and brings her into the bathroom with Ian. During their captivity, Ian realizes that he does still love his wife, and the couple makes up.

The next morning, Sara comes to the house, furious that Ian did not show up at the airport to go to Paris with her. The burglars put Sara into the bathroom with the reconciled couple, and the three discuss their love-triangle situation. They manage to escape by calling the police from Sara's cell phone, which is in her back pocket. After the whole ordeal, Ian chooses to stay with Louise.

Some time later, Ian and Louise have sold their house and are moving away. They have had a baby as they had tried to in the past. They decide to have lunch one last time in town before they move. While walking to the restaurant, they walk past the same burglar who robbed their house, and the burglar nods at them in recognition. Louise looks away and walks away quickly, and Ian looks stunned (implying she organized the burglary).

== Cast ==
- Meg Ryan as Louise
- Timothy Hutton as Ian
- Kristen Bell as Sara
- Justin Long as Todd

== Production ==
Serious Moonlight's screenplay was written by filmmaker Adrienne Shelly, best known for writing and directing Waitress, an indie hit that co-starred Cheryl Hines and was later adapted into a Broadway musical. Tragically, Adrienne Shelly was murdered in her New York City office on November 1, 2006, mere months before Waitress debuted at Sundance to rave reviews.

Serious Moonlight was one of several completed scripts that Adrienne Shelly left behind after her untimely death. Shelley's widower, Andy Ostroy, acted as a producer for the film, and Cheryl Hines, one of the stars of Shelly's final movie, directed. "I feel a great sense of pride to be directing this film," Hines said. "I had such respect for Adrienne and the work she did. And I love her writing so much. That tone is really in my wheelhouse." The film marked Hines' feature directorial debut.

The title is taken from the lyrics of the 1983 David Bowie song "Lets Dance."

== Release ==
The film premiered at the Tribeca Film Festival in April 2009.

On 28 July, Magnolia Pictures revealed that it had acquired the North American rights to the film. It was released via Magnolia's Ultra VOD programme, providing a platform of 50 million households. This was followed by a December 4, 2009 theatrical release.

Myriad Pictures distributed the film outside of North America.

== Reception ==
The film received a negative critical reaction. On the review aggregator website Rotten Tomatoes, 21% of 38 critics' reviews are positive, with an average rating of 3.9/10. The website's consensus reads: "Serious Moonlight jumbles a comic tone with tragic circumstances and the result is confused performances from its stars." Metacritic, which uses a weighted average, assigned the film a score of 36 out of 100, based on 16 critics, indicating "generally unfavorable" reviews.

Among those who praised the film, The Hollywood Reporter said: "'Moonlight' has its serious side as an intelligent peephole into the psychological and sexual dynamics that can drive a once loving, loyal couple to the edge of criminality." They also praised Ryan's "terrific" performance and concluded that the film is "a nuttily engaging tale of betrayal and, perhaps, redemption." The Los Angeles Times considered it "one of the pleasures of [Waitress] -- from conception to character to the conversations that fill the scenes -- is the savvy and off-center way [writer, director, and co-star Adrienne] Shelly had of crafting troubled relationships. Thankfully, Waitress co-star Cheryl Hines has not lost sight of that in making her feature directing debut."

Most critics agreed with Mick LaSalle of the San Francisco Chronicle, who believed the film to be "a tonal disaster, distasteful and sentimental by turns. It was probably a mistake to have Hines try to walk that same delicate line that took Shelly her entire career to master." The New York Post thought it "foul" and "a shrill farce that strains credibility even by the standards of black comedy", with "a problematic script by murdered filmmaker Adrienne Shelly (Waitress), which never should have seen the light of day". The Village Voice found the film's "backstory much more intriguingly dramatic than what's onscreen".
