= 1950 Pulitzer Prize =

Awards for journalism and related fields

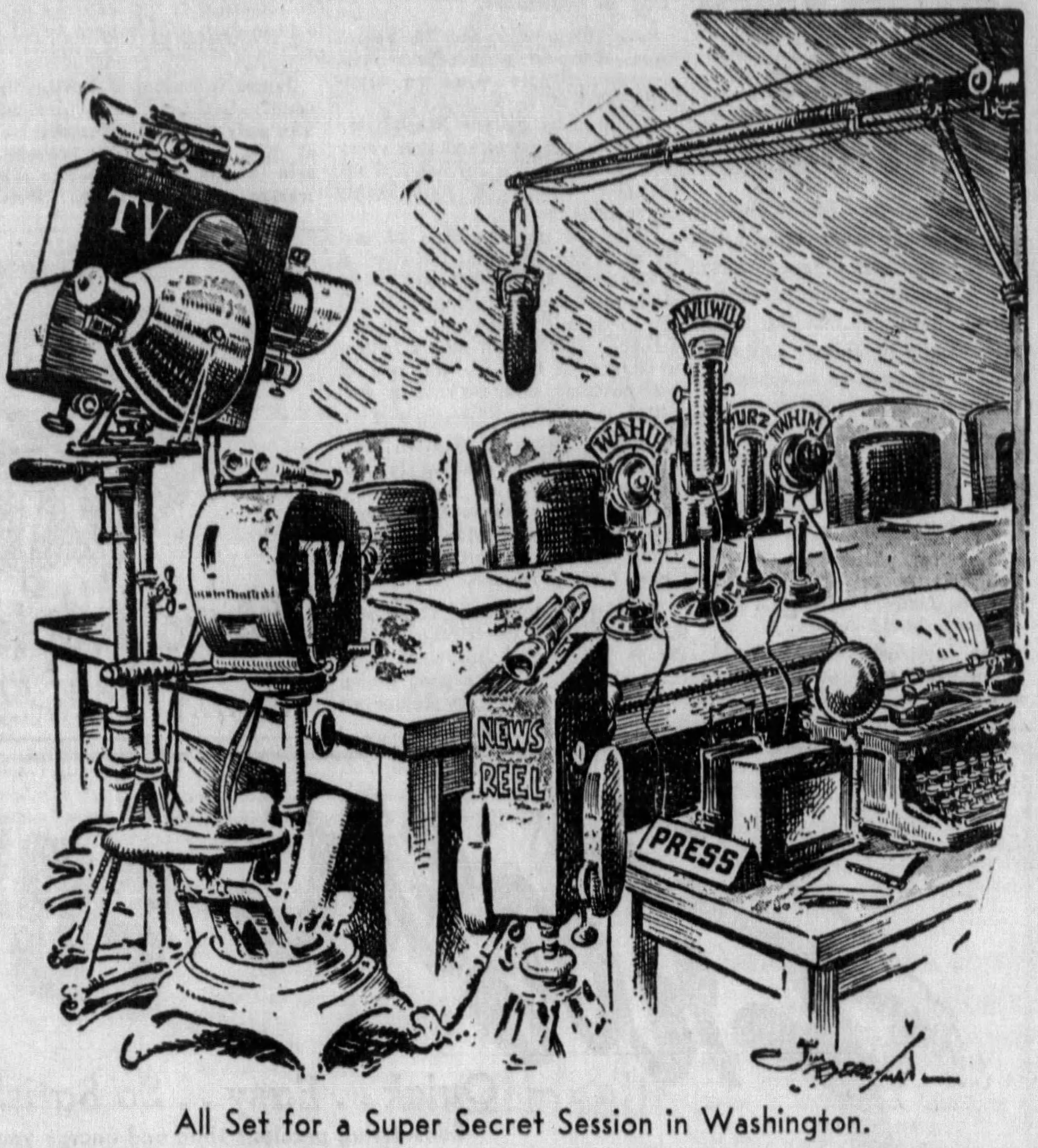
"All Set for a Super-Secret Session in Washington", the prize-winning editorial cartoon

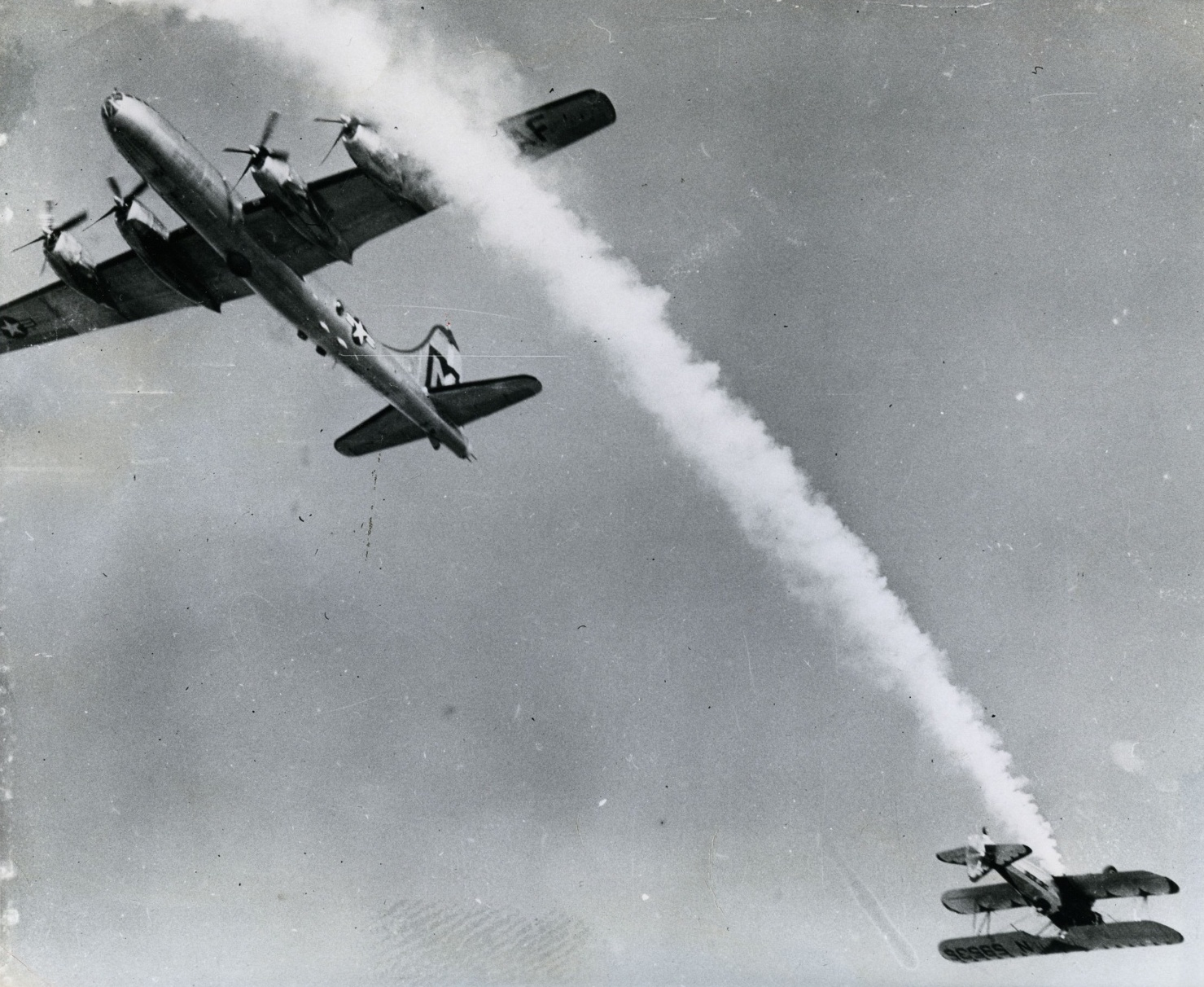
"Near Collision at Air Show", the prize-winning photograph

The following are the Pulitzer Prizes for 1950.

== Journalism awards ==
- Public Service:
  - The Chicago Daily News and the St. Louis Post-Dispatch, for the work of George Thiem and Roy J. Harris, respectively, in exposing the presence of 37 Illinois newspapermen on an Illinois State payroll.
- Local Reporting:
  - Meyer Berger of The New York Times, for his 4,000-word story on the mass killings by Howard Unruh in Camden, New Jersey.
- National Reporting:
  - Edwin O. Guthman of The Seattle Times, for his series on the clearing of Communist charges of Professor Melvin Rader, who had been accused of attending a secret Communist school.
- International Reporting:
  - Edmund Stevens of The Christian Science Monitor, for his series of 43 articles written over a three-year residence in Moscow entitled, "This Is Russia Uncensored".
- Editorial Writing:
  - Carl M. Saunders of the Jackson Citizen Patriot, for distinguished editorial writing during the year.
- Editorial Cartooning:
  - James T. Berryman of the Washington Evening Star, for "All Set for a Super-Secret Session in Washington".
- Photography:
  - Bill Crouch of The Oakland Tribune, for his picture, "Near Collision at Air Show".

== Letters, Drama and Music Awards ==
- Fiction:
  - The Way West by A. B. Guthrie Jr. (Sloane).
- Drama:
  - South Pacific by Richard Rodgers, Oscar Hammerstein II, and Joshua Logan (Random).
- History:
  - Art and Life in America by Oliver W. Larkin (Rinehart).
- Biography or Autobiography:
  - John Quincy Adams and the Foundations of American Foreign Policy by Samuel Flagg Bemis (Knopf).
- Poetry:
  - Annie Allen by Gwendolyn Brooks (Harper).
- Music;
  - Music in The Consul by Gian Carlo Menotti (G. Schirmer), produced at the Ethel Barrymore Theatre, New York.
