= Frank Rosenwein =

- Born: 1978 (age 46–47); Evanston, Illinois, U.S.
- Genres: Classical
- Instruments: Oboe
- Education: Cleveland Institute of Music (BM); Juilliard School (MM)
- Mother: Barbara H. Rosenwein

Frank Rosenwein (born 1978) is an American classical oboist.

== Early life and education ==
Rosenwein was born in Evanston, Illinois. He pursued his undergraduate studies at the Cleveland Institute of Music, where he studied with former Cleveland Orchestra principal oboe John Mack. He received his Master of Music from the Juilliard School.

== Career ==
Rosenwein was principal oboe of the San Diego Symphony and San Diego Opera from 2002 to 2005 and was guest principal oboe with the Chicago Symphony Orchestra. As of 2005, he has been the principal oboe of the Cleveland Orchestra. Since 2006, he has been head of the oboe department at the Cleveland Institute of Music.

== Personal life ==
He is the son of the medieval historian and academic Barbara H. Rosenwein.
