= Gertrude O'Brady =

American artist

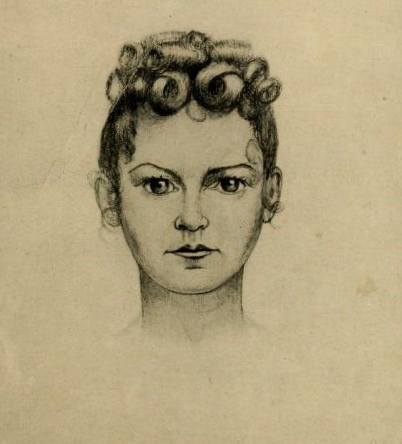
- Self-portrait
- Born: 1903; Evanston, Illinois
- Died: 1978 (aged 74–75)
- Known for: Her works of art

Gertrude O'Brady was an American artist who was detained by the Nazis during World War II.

== Early life ==
Gertrude O'Brady was born in Evanston, Illinois in 1903. O'Brady was the oldest of her family and was of Irish origin. She devoted her youth to study, including of the piano. Christianne Gillerot described O'Brady in her early years as a "young girl full of enthusiasm and gaiety". O'Brady aspired to go to France to train to perfect her composition.

== Time in Europe ==
At around the age of 24, O'Brady's pernicious anaemia forced her to drop her dreams of moving to France. She married twice, attempting to live a normal life. But, O'Brady was still attracted by Europe. In 1938, at the age of 36, O'Brady attempted to go to Spain to fight the fascists. By the time O'Brady reached Paris, her anaemia forced her to stay in Paris. O'Brady started painting in 1939 and was supported by Anatole Jakovsky.

During the Nazi occupation of France, O'Brady was detained by the Nazis and sent to the Vittel concentration camp because she was American. During her internment, O'Brady was given paper and pencils by the Red Cross, which she used to draw her fellow prisoners and living spaces. O'Brady was released in 1944. At an exhibition at the Grand Hôtel de Vittel in the same year, many were able to recognize themselves in O'Brady's drawings made while in internment.

After World War II, O'Brady decided to stay in France. O'Brady lived a nomadic lifestyle during this time drawing anyone she met. Some of the more notable people O'Brady drew during this time were Jean Cocteau, Paul Eluard, Jean Dubuffet.

== Return to the United States ==
In 1949, O'Brady went to Manhattan. Critics in Manhattan initially weren't enthusiastic about her first show in the city but changed their opinions after seeing her new style. O'Brady expressed a wish to travel the United States during this time, but after exhibiting her work in Manhattan she stopped making art and retired to a convent. Jakovsky tried to find O'Brady, but found no success in this endeavor. O'Brady died in 1978.

== Legacy ==
Jakovsky called O'Brady "the meteor of naïve painting" and considered her an equal to Douanier Rousseau. O'Brady was also called "the Arthur Rimbaud of painting". Jakovsky also called O'Brady "the only great painter of the New World." While Maximilien Gauthier predicted that O'Brady would become a "great name in the history of art." French critics have compared O'Brady's works before she was placed in a concentration camp to Douanier, and her ones after to Fouquet's.

In 2025, some of O'Brady's works were shown at the Lille Métropole Musée d’art moderne as part of their Modigliani Picasso and the Voices of Modernity from the LaM Museum exhibition.
