= I Can See Your Voice (American game show) =

American television game show

- Genre: Game show
- Based on: I Can See Your Voice by CJ ENM
- Directed by: Ashley S. Gorman
- Creative director: Maddie Wagg
- Presented by: Ken Jeong
- Starring: Adrienne Bailon-Houghton; Cheryl Hines
- Country of origin: United States
- Original language: English
- No. of seasons: 3
- No. of episodes: 34 (list of episodes)

Production
- Executive producers: Ken Jeong; James McKinlay; Craig Plestis
- Producers: Khaliel Abdelrahim; Madison Blakey; Danni Steele; Rachel Sussman
- Camera setup: Multi-camera
- Running time: 43–44 minutes
- Production companies: CJ ENM; Fox Alternative Entertainment

Original release
- Network: Fox
- Release: September 23, 2020 – June 6, 2024

Related
- I Can See Your Voice franchise

I Can See Your Voice is an American television music game show, based on the South Korean program of the same title, featuring a "mystery music game show" format where guest artist(s) and contestant(s) attempt to eliminate bad singers from the group, until the last mystery singer remains for a duet performance. Hosted by actor and comedian Ken Jeong, it premiered on Fox on September 23, 2020.

== Gameplay ==
Presented with a group of six mystery singers identified only by their occupation, a contestant must attempt to eliminate bad singers from the group without ever hearing them perform live, over the course of six rounds. The contestant is assisted by clues regarding the singers' backgrounds and performance style, and observations from a celebrity panel and musical guest. The contestant must eliminate one singer at the end of each of the first five rounds, receiving $15,000 ($10,000 in season one) if they eliminate a bad singer.

- In the first two rounds, the "Lip Sync Showdown", the six singers are divided into three pairs, which each compete in a lip sync battle against each other. The bad singers mime to a backing track recorded by another vocalist, while the good singers mime to a recording of their own performance. The contestant may use the "Golden Mic" once during the rounds, during which they may hear additional clues and observations from a celebrity guest off-stage.
  - In season 1, this round was conducted as the "Lip Sync Challenge", which featured the singers giving individual lip sync performances.
- The third and fourth rounds are conducted with two of three rotating formats:
  - "A Day in the Life", where the contestant is presented with a video package chronicling the daily lives of one of the remaining singers.
  - "Super Fan", where the contestant is presented with a video package featuring a "super fan" of one of the remaining singers.
  - "Secret Snoop", where the contestant "tours" the remaining singers' homes for clues (which may include red herrings) for 60 seconds.
  - In the first season, "Unlock My Life" was played as the third round, where the contestant is presented a video package relating to one of the four remaining singers of their choice. This was followed by "Secret Studio", where the contestant is presented with video from a recording session by one of the three remaining singers of their choice, but pitch-shifted to obscure their actual vocals.
- The final round is the "Interrogation", where the contestant may ask questions of the two remaining singers for 60 seconds. The good singers are required to give truthful responses, while the bad singers must lie.

At the end of the game, the contestant may either end the game and keep the money they had won in previous rounds, or risk it for a chance to win the grand prize of $100,000 if the last remaining singer is good, as revealed by means of a duet between the singer and one of the celebrity panelists.

== Background ==
Fox first announced the series during the Television Critics Association's January 2020 press tour; Ken Jeong (who serves as a panelist on The Masked Singer, Fox's adaptation of another South Korean format) served as host for the pilot. Fox ordered I Can See Your Voice to series in February 2020, with Jeong serving as both host and co-executive producer, alongside The Masked Singer executive producer Craig Plestis, and James McKinlay. Plestis was later replaced for season 3 by Daniel Martin.

One episode was completed before production was halted due to the COVID-19 pandemic. Fox resumed production with no studio audience under enhanced safety protocols in August 2020, becoming one of the network's first non-scripted series to do so. With Fox not airing episodes in production order, the first episode was broadcast later in the season. On August 26, 2020, Fox announced that singer Adrienne Houghton and actress Cheryl Hines would serve as regular celebrity panelists.

== Broadcast ==
I Can See Your Voice premiered on September 23, 2020, as part of Fox's fall lineup, accompanying the season 4 premiere of The Masked Singer.

On January 27, 2021, Fox renewed the series for a second season, which began with a holiday special on December 14, 2021, ahead of its timeslot premiere on January 5, 2022; a leftover season 2 episode aired later in the season on June 26, 2022.

During its upfronts in May 2023, Fox renewed the series for a third season, with filming taking place at Trilith Studios in Fayetteville, Georgia. Originally scheduled to premiere on September 19, 2023 as replacement programming due to the WGA and SAG–AFTRA strikes, Fox ultimately scheduled reruns of 9-1-1: Lone Star in its timeslot instead. Season 3 was pushed back to its normal winter scheduling, with its first block of episodes premiering on January 3, 2024, followed by a second that began on May 16, 2024.

== Series overview ==
Season	Episodes		Originally released	
Season	Episodes		First released	Last released
1	10		September 23, 2020	December 9, 2020
2	10		January 5, 2022	March 8, 2022
3	12	8	January 3, 2024	February 21, 2024
3	12	4	May 16, 2024	June 6, 2024
Sp	2		December 14, 2021	June 26, 2022
