= George Thiem =

American politician

Member of the Illinois House of Representatives

Personal details
- Born: July 8, 1897
- Died: July 8, 1987 (aged 90)
- Party: Republican

Ezra George Thiem (July 8, 1897 – July 8, 1987) was an American journalist, an investigative reporter whose work was rewarded twice with the annual Pulitzer Prize for Public Service. He then became a politician who served in the Illinois state legislature.

== Journalism career ==
Thiem was born in Chicago, Illinois. He began in journalism in the 1920s, as editor of the Prairie Farmer; he also served as information officer of the Illinois Agricultural Association.

In 1942, he joined the Chicago Daily News. The Daily News and St. Louis Post-Dispatch jointly received the 1950 Pulitzer Prize for Public Service for the work of Thiem and Roy J. Harris for "exposing the presence of 37 Illinois newspapermen on an Illinois State payroll".

Thiems's work contributed to the Chicago Daily News winning the 1957 Pulitzer Prize for Public Service, which cited "determined and courageous public service in exposing a $2,500,000 fraud centering in the office of the State Auditor of Illinois, resulting in the indictment and conviction of the State Auditor and others. This led to the reorganization of State procedures to prevent a recurrence of the fraud." Thiem's coverage of the "Hodge scandal" involved an Illinois official, Orville Hodge, who was a personal friend until Thiem's work demonstrated that Hodge was embezzling from the state. In 1962, Thiem's book The Hodge Scandal: a Pattern of American Political Corruption was published by St Martin's Press.

== After journalism ==
In 1959, Thiem replied to suggestions that he be nominated for public office with "I'd rather be a reporter." In 1962, however, he retired from journalism and entered politics. He was elected to the Illinois General Assembly as a Republican and served from 1964 to 1966. Later as a resident of Evanston (Cook County) Thiem served a six-year term as a Trustee of the Chicago Metropolitan Sanitary District (1967 to 1972). He was the only Republican on the Democratic-dominated Board leading a more transparent oversight process of Cook County's expenditures and contracts within the Chicago Metropolitan Sanitary District.

Thiem died in a nursing home in his native city of Evanston on his 90th birthday.
