= Lori Voornas =

American radio personality

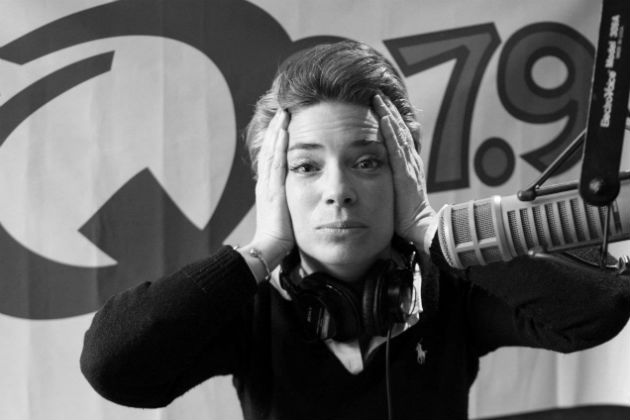
Lori Voornas

Lori Voornas (born September 12, 1965) is part of the morning show, The Q Morning Show with Lori, Jeff and Brittany on 97.9 WJBQ radio in Portland, Maine. She was born in Evanston, Illinois.
