= Robert Sampson (disability rights activist) =

American lawyer

- Born: March 4, 1925; Evanston, Illinois
- Died: December 3, 2006 (aged 81); Arlington Heights, Illinois
- Employer: United Airlines

Robert Sampson (March 4, 1925 – December 3, 2006) was a vice president at United Airlines. He was diagnosed with muscular dystrophy at age 5, and used a wheelchair for most of his life.

Sampson, a lawyer, was an advocate for disabled persons. He served the President's Commission on Employment of the Handicapped under five American presidents. His efforts helped lead to architectural improvements in access for disabled people, such as wheelchair ramps.

Sampson partnered with Jerry Lewis to raise money for the treatment of muscular dystrophy.

A Boeing 747-400, tail number N116UA, is named after him.
