= Cheryl Hines =

American actress (born 1965)

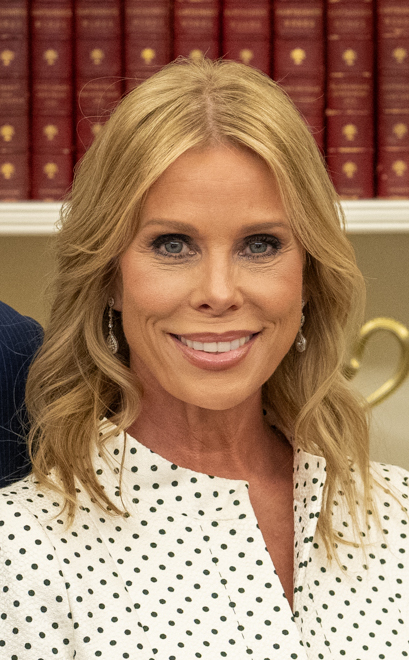
- Hines at the White House in 2025
- Born: Cheryl Ruth Hines; September 21, 1965 (age 61); Miami Beach, Florida, U.S.
- Education: University of Central Florida (BA)
- Occupations: Actress; comedian
- Years active: 1993–present
- Television: Curb Your Enthusiasm; Suburgatory; Son of Zorn; I Can See Your Voice
- Spouses: Paul Young (m. 2002; div. 2010) Robert F. Kennedy Jr. (m. 2014)
- Children: 1
- Relatives: Kennedy family (by marriage)

Cheryl Ruth Hines (born September 21, 1965) is an American actress and comedian. She portrayed Cheryl David on HBO's Curb Your Enthusiasm (2000–2024), earning two Primetime Emmy Award nominations. She also starred as Dallas Royce on the ABC sitcom Suburgatory (2011–2014) and made her directorial debut with the 2009 film Serious Moonlight. She is married to Robert F. Kennedy Jr., the 26th and current U.S. Secretary of Health and Human Services.

== Early life and education ==
Hines was born on September 21, 1965, in Miami Beach, Florida, to James and Rosemary Hines. She spent much of her childhood in Tallahassee, where she was actively involved in the Young Actors Theatre. Due to financial hardships—she reportedly did not have her own bed until after high school—she pursued her education at Lively Technical Center and Tallahassee State College before earning a degree in radio and television production from the University of Central Florida in 1990.

== Career ==
Hines began her acting career by performing improvisational comedy at The Groundlings Theater. Her fellow students included Lisa Kudrow. Hines made guest appearances on television shows such as Swamp Thing and Unsolved Mysteries. She also appeared on an episode of The Dating Game in 1996. She was not picked on the episode.

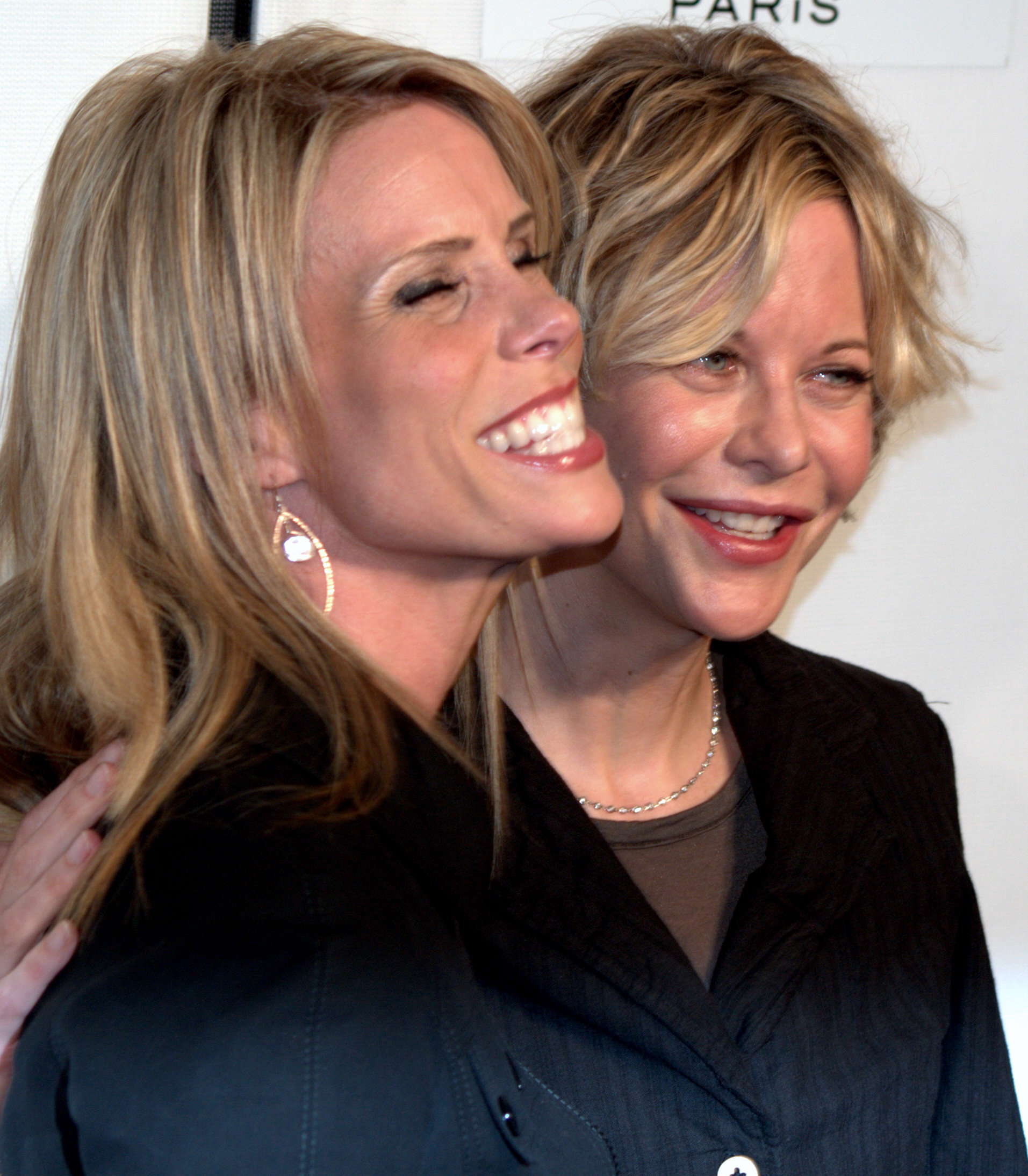
Hines and Meg Ryan at the 2009 premiere of Serious Moonlight, Hines's directorial debut

Hines received an Emmy nomination for Outstanding Supporting Actress in a Comedy Series for her work on Curb Your Enthusiasm in 2003 and 2006. She has said that "Until Curb, I'd done small roles, really small roles. They wanted to cast an unknown actress. It worked in my favor that I hadn't done anything. It changed my life."

Hines appeared in RV with Robin Williams, Waitress with Keri Russell, and the 2008 mockumentary The Grand, a spoof of the World Series of Poker. Her 2009 directorial debut Serious Moonlight stars Meg Ryan with a script by the late Adrienne Shelly, Hines's director and co-star in Waitress.

Hines played Jane in the 2009 ABC sitcom In the Motherhood. It is a loose adaptation of the web series of the same name. The series was dropped due to low ratings after five of its planned seven episodes were aired. During the 2009–2010 season of Brothers & Sisters, Hines guest-starred as Kitty Walker McCallister's campaign manager, Buffy. In July 2010, Hines was announced to be joining the cast of the Nickelodeon film based on The Fairly OddParents, A Fairly Odd Movie: Grow Up, Timmy Turner! as a human disguise of Wanda, Timmy's fairy godmother.

Hines served as executive producer for the 2010 reality series School Pride, which follows the renovation of a different school each week. Hines starred as Dallas Royce on the ABC sitcom Suburgatory. The series ended in 2014 after three seasons. She appeared in We Need Help, a web series airing on Yahoo! Screen. On January 29, 2014, Hines received the 2,516th star on the Hollywood Walk of Fame.

Hines is a panelist on a singing game show, I Can See Your Voice.

== Personal life ==
Hines married Paul Young, the founder of the management firm Principato-Young, on December 30, 2002. They had a daughter, Catherine Rose Young, on March 8, 2004. After nearly eight years of marriage, Hines and Young filed for divorce on July 20, 2010. Zoe Hines, the daughter of Hines's sister Rebecca, was signed by the WWE as a professional wrestler in April 2026.

Hines has been actively involved in advocacy work, particularly with United Cerebral Palsy (UCP). Her involvement began after a nephew was born with cerebral palsy, prompting her to seek resources and support from the organization. Over time, she became a vocal advocate and as of 2010 served on UCP's board of trustees. In 2015, Hines and her family won $25,000 for UCP while competing on Celebrity Family Feud.

Hines was raised Roman Catholic.

=== Marriage to Robert F. Kennedy Jr. ===
Hines began dating Robert F. Kennedy Jr. in December 2011 after being introduced by her Curb Your Enthusiasm co-star, Larry David. The couple announced their engagement in April 2014 and married on August 2, 2014, at the Kennedy Compound on Cape Cod. In June 2019, Hines accompanied Kennedy on a trip to Samoa where they were special guests at the country's 57th Independence Celebration in Mulinu'u. Her presence added a degree of Hollywood visibility to the trip.

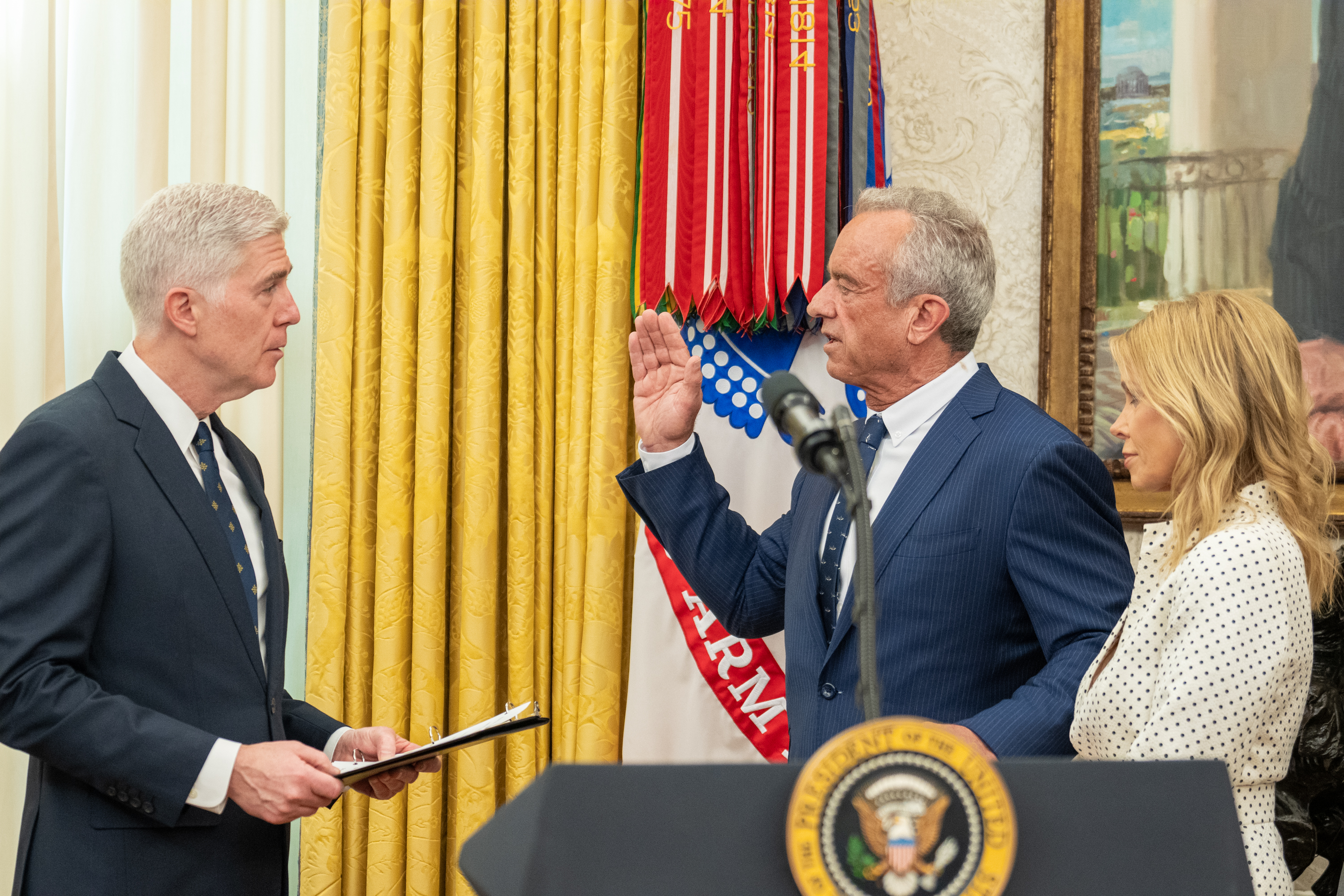
Hines with her husband as he is sworn in as Secretary of Health and Human Services, 2025.

Hines publicly supported Kennedy during his 2024 presidential campaign and subsequent confirmation as Secretary of Health and Human Services. She appeared at his Senate confirmation hearing alongside other supporters of his Make America Healthy Again (MAHA) platform.

Both Hines and Kennedy attended the memorial service for conservative activist Charlie Kirk in September 2025; she said the dangerous political climate frightened her "more than anything."

== Filmography ==
=== Film ===
Year	Title	Role	Notes
1996	Cheap Curry and Calculus	Sheila	Short film
2004	Along Came Polly	Catering Manager	
2005	Cake	Roxanne	
2005	Herbie: Fully Loaded	Sally	
2005	Our Very Own	Sally Crowder	
2006	Bickford Shmeckler's Cool Ideas	Professor Adams	
2006	RV	Jamie Munro	
2006	Keeping Up with the Steins	Casey Nudelman	
2007	Waitress	Becky	
2007	Goodnight Vagina	Meg March	Short film
2007	The Grand	Lainie Schwartzman	
2008	Hollywood Residential	Herself	
2008	Henry Poole Is Here	Meg Wyatt	
2008	Bart Got a Room	Beth Stein	
2008	Space Chimps	Luna (voice)	
2009	All in the Bunker	Eva Braun (voice)	Animated short
2009	Labor Pains	Lisa DePardo	
2009	The Ugly Truth	Georgia	
2010	The Legend of Secret Pass	Nitika (voice)	
2010	Space Chimps 2: Zartog Strikes Back	Luna (voice)	
2014	Life After Beth	Judy Orfman	
2014	Think Like a Man 2	Andrea	
2015	The Benefactor	Mia	
2015	Christmas Eve	Dawn	Also known as Stuck
2016	Nine Lives	Madison Camden	
2017	Wilson	Polly	
2017	A Bad Moms Christmas	Sandy	
2021	Trollhunters: Rise of the Titans	Momblank (voice)	
2022	About Fate	Judy	
2024	Popular Theory	Tammy Page	

=== Television ===
Year	Title	Role	Notes
1993	Swamp Thing	Louise Brenner	Episode: "Heart of the Mantis"
1997	Unsolved Mysteries	Sharon Berman (Ashley's mother)	Episode: "9.18" - YouTube/FlimRise Episode: "9.15"
1998	The Wayans Bros.	Helen	Episode: "Six Degrees of Marlon"
1998	Suddenly Susan	Debbie	Episode: "Poetry in Notion"
1999	Suddenly Susan	Marla	Episode: "The Cheerleaders"
1999	Larry David: Curb Your Enthusiasm	Cheryl David	TV movie (series pilot)
2000	Friends	Woman #2	Episode: "The One with Rachel's Sister"
2000–2024	Curb Your Enthusiasm	Cheryl David	Main role (seasons 1–7, 9–12; guest season 8)
2002	So Little Time	Barbara Morrison	Episode: "The Job"
2002	Everybody Loves Raymond	Lauren Williamson	Episode: "Annoying Kid"
2003	Reno 911!	Trailer Park Lady	Episode: "Terrorist Training: Part 1"
2003	A Tale of Two Wives	Rose Goodman	TV movie
2003	Wanda at Large	Dr. Linda	Episode: "Did Wanda Say a Four Letter Word?"
2004–2005	Father of the Pride	Kate (voice)	14 episodes
2006	Scrubs	Paige Cox	Episode: "My New God"
2007	Jack's Big Music Show	Sudsy Bubblestein	Episode: "Mel's Bath Day"
2009	Hannah Montana	Catherine York	Episode: "What I Don't Like About You"
2009	In the Motherhood	Jane	7 episodes
2010	Wright vs. Wrong	Keri Daly	TV movie
2010	The Super Hero Squad Show	Stardust (voice)	2 episodes
2010	Brothers & Sisters	Buffy McCreary	3 episodes
2011	Love Bites	Kristen Lerner	Episode: "Too Much Information"
2011	A Fairly Odd Movie: Grow Up, Timmy Turner!	Wanda	TV movie
2011–2014	Suburgatory	Dallas Royce	Main role; 56 episodes
2013	Hollywood Game Night	Herself	2 episodes
2014	The Crazy Ones	Beth Minker	Episode: "Zach Mitzvah"
2015	The Middle	Dr. Sommer Samuelson	Episode: "The Convention"
2015–2016	TripTank	Various voices	4 episodes
2016	Young & Hungry	Kathy Kaminski	Episode: "Young & Parents"
2016–2018	Mike Tyson Mysteries	Virgilia / Jillian Davis (voice)	2 episodes
2016–2017	Son of Zorn	Edie Bennett	Main role; 13 episodes
2017	Pickle and Peanut	Susan (voice)	Episode: "Wet Wedding"
2017–2018	Nobodies	Herself	2 episodes
2017–2019	Funny You Should Ask	Herself	35 episodes
2018	Fresh Off the Boat	Fay	Episode: "Big Baby"
2018	Hell's Kitchen	Herself	Blue Team's VIP guest diner; Episode: "Hell Freezes Over"
2018–2019	3Below: Tales of Arcadia	Momblank (voice)	16 episodes
2018–2019	This Close	Stella	6 episodes
2019	The Good Fight	Brenda Decarlo	Episode: "The One Where the Sun Comes Out"
2019	Drunk History	Lady Bird Johnson	Episode: "Fame"
2020	Make It Work!	Herself	Television special
2020	Stumptown	Ginger Lloyd	Episode: "Dirty Dexy Money"
2020	The Conners	Dawn	Episode: "Mud Turtles, A Good Steak and One Man in a Tub"
2020	The Masked Singer	Guest panelist	Episode: "The Group B Finals - The Mask Chance Saloon"
2020–2024	I Can See Your Voice	Herself	Regular panelist
2021	The Masked Dancer	Guest panelist	
2022	The Flight Attendant	Dot Karlson	Main role (season 2)
2022	Lego Masters	Herself	3 episodes
2023	Fantasy Island	Jessica Warren	Episode: "Tara and Jessica's High School Reunion / Cat Lady"

=== Producer ===
Year	Title	Notes
2006–2007	Campus Ladies	3 episodes
2008	Hollywood Residential	TV series

=== Director ===
Year	Title	Notes
2006	Campus Ladies	Episode: "No Means No"
2009	Serious Moonlight	Feature film debut
2020	Curb Your Enthusiasm	Episode: "Artificial Fruit"

== Audio broadcasts ==
=== Podcasts ===
==== Hosted ====
- 2020–2024: Tig and Cheryl: True Story – cohosted with Tig Notaro

==== Guest ====
- 2020: The Modern Moron Episode 64 and 65
- 2020: Don't Ask Tig
- 2021: Literally! with Rob Lowe
- 2023, 2025: The Tim Dillon Show (with Robert F. Kennedy Jr.)
- 2026: The Joe Rogan Experience
