= List of I Can See Your Voice Thailand episodes =

Television game show episode list

About the series
- I Can See Your Voice Thailand is a Thai television mystery music game show produced by Workpoint Entertainment and broadcast by Workpoint TV, featuring its format based on the South Korean programme of the same title.
- More about the series

Episodes overview
- Total episode(s): 329
- Aired episode(s): 319
- Special episode(s): 10

The Thai television mystery music game show I Can See Your Voice Thailand has played a total of six seasons and 329 episodes; broadcasting on Workpoint TV from 13 January 2016 to 18 October 2023. As for milestone games, Tai Tanawut played in the 100th episode on 31 January 2018; Apaporn Nakornsawan defeated Yingyong Yodbuangam in the 200th episode on 8 January 2020; and Apiwat Eurthavornsuk in the 300th episode on 19 January 2022.

The Thai adaptation is known for its six-year continuous broadcast during first run that aired for five seasons and 313 episodes on weekly scheduling, with mostly came from a 101-episode third season (as the longest-running by duration with 708 days, from 21 November 2018 to 28 October 2020).

== Series overview ==
Series	Episodes	Originally released		Good singers	Bad singers
Series	Episodes	First released	Last released	Good singers	Bad singers
1	77	13 January 2016	9 August 2017	55	22
2	64	16 August 2017	14 November 2018	51	13
3	101	21 November 2018	28 October 2020	96	29
4	43	4 November 2020	6 October 2021	46	16
5	18	13 October 2021	23 February 2022	18	0
6	16	5 July 2023	18 October 2023	10	6
Sp	10	16 November 2016	9 February 2022	—N/a	—N/a

== Episodes ==
=== Season 1 (2016–17) ===
List of season 1 episodes
No. overall	No. in season	Guest artist(s)	Player order (Note: It refers to the guest artist(s) that have played in according to their first game; returning guest artists (which also include foreigners or former good singers, with their names displaying in italics) are not counted.)	Original release date
2016
1	1	Saranyu Winaipanit	1	13 January 2016
2	2	Arnon Saisangchan	2	20 January 2016
3	3	Peerapat Tenwong	3	27 January 2016
4	4	Kornpob Janjarearn	4	3 February 2016
5	5	Sirisin Chotvijit (AB Normal)	5	10 February 2016
6	6	Prakarn Raiva (Getsunova)	6	17 February 2016
7	7	Sarunrat Visutthithada	7	24 February 2016
8	8	Saksit Vejsupaporn	8	2 March 2016
9	9	Apiwat Eurthavornsuk	9	9 March 2016
10	10	Jirakorn Sompitak	10	16 March 2016
11	11	Chinawut Indracusin	11	23 March 2016
12	12	Mild	12	30 March 2016
13	13	Pongkool Suebsung	13	6 April 2016
14	14	Rangsan Panyaruen	14	13 April 2016
15	15	Anuwat Sanguansakpakdee (Peacemaker)	15	20 April 2016
16	16	Palitchoke Ayanaputra	16	27 April 2016
17	17	Jintara Poonlarp	17	4 May 2016
18	18	Burin Boonvisut	18	11 May 2016
19	19	Preeyawit Niljulka	19	18 May 2016
20	20	Popetorn Soonthornyanakij	20	25 May 2016
21	21	Singto Numchok	21	1 June 2016
22	22	Issara Kitnitchi	22	8 June 2016
23	23	Phunkorn Boonyachinda	23	15 June 2016
24	24	Ratklao Amaradit	24	22 June 2016
25	25	Saharat Sangkapreecha	25	29 June 2016
26	26	Lipta	26	6 July 2016
27	27	Jack (The Richman Toys)	27	13 July 2016
28	28	Thierry Mekwattana	28	20 July 2016
29	29	Chaiamorn Kaewwiboonpan (The Bottom Blues)	29	27 July 2016
30	30	Saranyu Winaipanit	—	3 August 2016
31	31	Kornpob Janjarearn	—	10 August 2016
32	32	Saksit Vejsupaporn	—	17 August 2016
33	33	Jirakorn Sompitak	—	24 August 2016
34	34	Theng Therdtherng	30	31 August 2016
35	35	Ohm (Cocktail)	31	7 September 2016
36	36	Etcetera	32	14 September 2016
37	37	Rannaphan Yungyuenpoonchai (Klear)	33	21 September 2016
38	38	Win Siriwong (Sqweez Animal)	34	28 September 2016
39	39	Thanida Thamwimon	35	5 October 2016
40	40	Anusorn Maneeted (Armchair)	36	12 October 2016
41	41	Kanikul Netbute	37	23 November 2016
42	42	Krissada Sukosol Clapp	38	30 November 2016
43	43	Anchalee Jongkadeekij	39	7 December 2016
44	44	Mr. Team	40	14 December 2016
45	45	Jennifer Kim	41	21 December 2016
2017
46	46	Patiparn Pataweekarn	42	4 January 2017
47	47	Lula	43	11 January 2017
48	48	Thaitanium	44	18 January 2017
49	49	Kat English	45	25 January 2017
50	50	Sirintip Hanpradit	46	1 February 2017
51	51	Sunaree Ratchasima	47	8 February 2017
52	52	Palaphol Pholkongseng	48	15 February 2017
53	53	Zeal	49	22 February 2017
54	54	Atom Chanagun	50	1 March 2017
55	55	Dax (Big Ass)	51	8 March 2017
56	56	Nicole Theriault	52	15 March 2017
57	57	Thanakrit Panichwid	53	22 March 2017
58	58	Labanoon	54	29 March 2017
59	59	Season Five	55	5 April 2017
60	60	Chirasak Panphum	56	12 April 2017
61	61	Sunita Leetikul	57	19 April 2017
62	62	Nuengthida Sophon	58	26 April 2017
63	63	Rhatha Phongam	59	3 May 2017
64	64	Issara Kitnitchi (Note: Highlights: Issara Kitnitchi (s1 ep. 64) also played under his "Durian" persona unmasked after winning the 1st season of The Masked Singer.; Got7 (s2 ep. 1) also returned on their 2nd game, when they last played for the original South Korean 4th season.; B5 (s2 ep. 22) designated as new players, which include the returning Saksit Vejsupaporn.; Sao Sao Sao (s2 ep. 60) designated as new players, which include the returning Saowalak Leelabut.; Nuvo (s3 ep. 47) designated as new players, which include the returning Saharat Sangkapreecha and Jirayuth Wattanasin.; Clash designated as new players, which include the returning Preeti Barameeanant.; Both Ball Chernyim and Jazz Chuanchuen ended a bad singer-picked draw under battle format in the Christmas episode, while Cheranut Yusanonda played in the New Year's Day episode.; Getsunova (s3 ep. 96) designated as new players, which include the returning Prakarn Raiva.; Kala (s3 ep. 98) designated as new players, which include the returning Yuthapong Sangsuwan.; Klear (s3 ep. 98) designated as new players, which include the returning Rannaphan Yungyuenpoonchai.)	—	10 May 2017
65	65	Haruthai Muangboonsri	60	17 May 2017
66	66	Slot Machine	61	24 May 2017
67	67	Jirayuth Wattanasin	62	31 May 2017
68	68	Fon Tanasoontorn	63	7 June 2017
69	69	Tik Shiro	64	14 June 2017
70	70	Yuthapong Sangsuwan (Kala)	65	21 June 2017
71	71	Seksan Sukpimai (Loso)	66	28 June 2017
72	72	Chaiya Mitchai	67	5 July 2017
73	73	Touch Na Takuatung	68	12 July 2017
74	74	Mai Charoenpura	69	19 July 2017
75	75	Worakarn Rojanawat	70	26 July 2017
76	76	Wichayanee Pearklin	71	2 August 2017
77	77	Nantida Kaewbuasai	72	9 August 2017

=== Season 2 (2017–18) ===
List of season 2 episodes
No. overall	No. in season	Guest artist(s)	Player order	Original release date
2017
78	1	Got7 (Note: Foreign guest artists: Denmark — Lukas Graham; Japan — AKB48; South Korea — Got7 and Kim Dong-han (WEi))	—	16 August 2017
79	2	Ruangsak Loychusak	73	23 August 2017
80	3	Saowalak Leelabut	74	30 August 2017
81	4	Nat Myria	75	6 September 2017
82	5	Pai Pongsatorn	76	13 September 2017
83	6	Preeti Barameeanant (Clash)	77	20 September 2017
84	7	Siriporn Yooyord	78	27 September 2017
85	8	Jazz Chuanchuen	79	4 October 2017
86	9	Napassorn Phuthornjai and Piyanut Sueajongpru	80–81	11 October 2017
87	10	Panadda Ruangwut	82	1 November 2017
88	11	Arnon Saisangchan	—	8 November 2017
89	12	Muzu	83	15 November 2017
90	13	Waii Panyarisa	84	22 November 2017
91	14	Tanatat Chaiyaat	85	29 November 2017
92	15	Potato	86	6 December 2017
93	16	UrboyTJ	87	13 December 2017
94	17	Jetset'er	88	20 December 2017
95	18	Nararak Jaibumrung	89	27 December 2017
2018
96	19	Inthira Yeunyong	90	3 January 2018
97	20	Buddha Bless	91	10 January 2018
98	21	Tattoo Colour	92	17 January 2018
99	22	B5	93	24 January 2018
100	23	Tai Tanawut	94	31 January 2018
101	24	Apaporn Nakornsawan	95	7 February 2018
102	25	Triumphs Kingdom	96	14 February 2018
103	26	Tachaya Prathumwan	97	21 February 2018
104	27	China Dolls	98	28 February 2018
105	28	Palmy	99	7 March 2018
106	29	Zack Chumphae	100	14 March 2018
107	30	Samran Chuaichamnaek (Fly)	101	21 March 2018
108	31	Supol Phuasirirak	102	28 March 2018
109	32	Mum Jokmok	103	4 April 2018
110	33	25 Hours	104	11 April 2018
111	34	Peerapat Tenwong	—	18 April 2018
112	35	Piya Satrawaha	105	25 April 2018
113	36	Tai Orathai	106	2 May 2018
114	37	BNK48	107	9 May 2018
115	38	Atom Chanagun	—	16 May 2018
116	39	Pongkool Suebsung	—	23 May 2018
117	40	Cham Chamrum	108	30 May 2018
118	41	Kiattisak Udomnak	109	6 June 2018
119	42	Joey Boy	110	13 June 2018
120	43	Pisanut Boonyuen	111	20 June 2018
121	44	Thanwa Boonsungnern	112	27 June 2018
122	45	Tanont Chumroen	113	4 July 2018
123	46	Mild	—	11 July 2018
124	47	Choi Rueammit	114	18 July 2018
125	48	Takkatan Chonlada	115	25 July 2018
126	49	Nat Sakdatorn	116	1 August 2018
127	50	Yinglee Seejumphon	117	8 August 2018
128	51	Pramote Pathan	118	15 August 2018
129	52	Jirayu La-ongmanee	119	22 August 2018
130	53	Ronnadet Wongsaroj	120	29 August 2018
131	54	Pongsak Rattanapong	121	5 September 2018
132	55	Jennifer Kim	—	12 September 2018
133	56	Unnop Thongborisut	122	19 September 2018
134	57	Natthawut Jenmana	123	26 September 2018
135	58	Rueangrit Siriphanit	124	3 October 2018
136	59	AKB48	125	10 October 2018
137	60	Sao Sao Sao	126	17 October 2018
138	61	Nuengthida Sophon	—	24 October 2018
139	62	Warawut Poyim	127	31 October 2018
140	63	D2B (Worrawech Danuwong and Kawee Tanjararak)	128–129	7 November 2018
141	64	Thanasit Jaturaput	130	14 November 2018

=== Season 3 (2018–20) ===
List of season 3 episodes
No. overall	No. in season	Guest artist(s)	Player order	Original release date
2018
142	1	Pisanu Nimsakul	131	21 November 2018
143	2	Kanitkul Netbute	—	28 November 2018
144	3	Twopee (Southside)	132	5 December 2018
145	4	Jaruwat Cheawaram	133	12 December 2018
146	5 (Note: This episode was aired in two parts on separate air dates.)	Bodyslam	134	19 December 2018 26 December 2018
2019
147	6	Sarunrat Visutthithada	—	2 January 2019
148	7	Nine by Nine	135	9 January 2019
149	8	Pitchaya Nitipaisalkul (Golf & Mike)	136	16 January 2019
150	9	Siriporn Ampaipong	137	23 January 2019
151	10	The Mousses	138	30 January 2019
152	11	Peter Corp Dyrendal	—	6 February 2019
153	12	Nattawat Srimawk	139	13 February 2019
154	13	Lukas Graham	140	20 February 2019
155	14	Lamyai Haithongkham	141	27 February 2019
156	15	Pijika Jittaputta	142	6 March 2019
157	16	Nittaya Bunsungnoen	143	13 March 2019
158	17	Isariya Patharamanop	144	20 March 2019
159	18	Pee Saderd	145	27 March 2019
160	19	Jintara Poonlarp	—	3 April 2019
161	20	The Parkinson	146	10 April 2019
162	21	Suratikan Pakcharoen	147	17 April 2019
163	22	Pancake	148	24 April 2019
164	23	Chinawut Indracusin	—	1 May 2019
165	24	Paowalee Pornphimol	149	8 May 2019
166	25	Pakorn Lam	150	15 May 2019
167	26	Etcetera	—	22 May 2019
168	27	Arak Amornsupasiri	151	29 May 2019
169	28	Uthen Phromminh	152	5 June 2019
170	29	Rung Suriya	153	12 June 2019
171	30	Phusin Warinrak	154	19 June 2019
172	31	Saksit Vejsupaporn	—	26 June 2019
173	32	Burin Boonvisut	—	3 July 2019
174	33	Nat Myria	—	10 July 2019
175	34	Monkan Kankoon	155	17 July 2019
176	35	Noknoi Uraiporn	156	24 July 2019
177	36	Jingreedkhao Wongtewan	157	31 July 2019
178	37	Suparuj Techatanon	158	7 August 2019
179	38	Pakkaramai Potranan	159	14 August 2019
180	39	Ekkachai Srivichai	160	21 August 2019
181	40	Kim Dong-han (WEi)	161	28 August 2019
182	41	Lamplern Wongsakorn	162	4 September 2019
183	42	Kornpassorn Duaysianklao	163	11 September 2019
184	43	Noo Meter	164	18 September 2019
185	44	Yuthapong Sangsuwan (Kala)	—	25 September 2019
186	45	Kong Huayrai	165	2 October 2019
187	46	Samtone	166	9 October 2019
188	47	Nuvo	167	16 October 2019
189	48	Mean	168	23 October 2019
190	49	Siriporn Yooyord vs. Sunaree Ratchasima	—	30 October 2019
191	50	Clash	169	6 November 2019
192	51	Ekarat Suvarnabhumi	170	13 November 2019
193	52	Palitchoke Ayanaputra	—	20 November 2019
194	53	Leew Ajareeya Prompruek	171	27 November 2019
195	54	Trinity	172	4 December 2019
196	55	Fon Tanasoontorn	—	11 December 2019
197	56	Ann Mitchai	173	18 December 2019
198	57	Ball Chernyim vs. Jazz Chuanchuen	174	25 December 2019
2020
199	58	Cheranut Yusanonda	175	1 January 2020
200	59	Yingyong Yodbuangam vs. Apaporn Nakornsawan	176	8 January 2020
201	60	Tono and The Dust	177	15 January 2020
202	61	Jenny and Lilly	178–179	22 January 2020
203	62	Apiwat Eurthavornsuk vs. Atom Chanagun	—	29 January 2020
204	63	Chinawut Indracusin vs. Isariya Patharamanop	—	5 February 2020
205	64	Pongsak Rattanapong vs. Rhatha Phongam	—	12 February 2020
206	65	Popetorn Soonthornyanakij vs. Issara Kitnitchi	—	19 February 2020
207	66	Arm Chutima vs. Toey Apiwat	180–181	26 February 2020
208	67	Monsit Khamsoi	182	4 March 2020
209	68	Choi Rueammit vs. Poppy Prachyaluk	183	11 March 2020
210	69	Thanaporn Wagprayoon	184	18 February 2020
211	70	Suthirat Wongtewan	185	25 February 2020
212	71	Chetta Chayachang (Hyper)	186	1 April 2020
213	72	Jaylerr and Paris	187–188	8 April 2020
214	73	Jittrakorn Boonsorn (I.nam)	189	15 April 2020
215	74	Bao Wee	190	22 April 2020
216	75	Ying Thitikarn	191	29 April 2020
217	76	Yinglee Seejumphon	—	6 May 2020
218	77	Nhong Chachacha vs. Thern Therdtherng	192	13 May 2020
219	78	Pok Mindset	193	20 May 2020
220	79	Super Valentine	194	27 May 2020
221	80	Bew Kanlayanee	195	3 June 2020
222	81	Kanormjeen Kunlamas vs. Waii Panyarisa	196	10 June 2020
223	82	Lamyai Haithongkham	—	17 June 2020
224	83	Gavin Duval vs. Thamthai Phlangsin	197–198	24 June 2020
225	84	Sompong Kunaprathom vs. Takkatan Chonlada	199	1 July 2020
226	85	Tanont Chumroen	—	8 July 2020
227	86	San Sansin	200	15 July 2020
228	87	Darunee Sutiphitak vs. Thanawat Prasitsomporn	201–202	22 July 2020
229	88	Oil Saengsin	203	29 July 2020
230	89	Dokaor Toongtong vs. Kantong Tungngern	204–205	5 August 2020
231	90	Duangta Kongthong	206	12 August 2020
232	91	Ratchanok Srilophan vs. Kowthip Thidadin	207–208	19 August 2020
233	92	Napassorn Phuthornjai and Piyanut Sueajongpru	—	26 August 2020
234	93	Yui Yatyer vs. Tossapol Himmapan	209–210	2 September 2020
235	94	Aod Fours	211	9 September 2020
236	95	Pai Pongsatorn vs. Tai Orathai	—	16 September 2020
237	96	Clash vs. Getsunova	212	23 September 2020
238	97	Pramote Pathan vs. Nipaporn Thititanakarn	213	30 September 2020
239	98	Kala vs. Klear	214–215	7 October 2020
240	99	Rung Suriya vs. Jingreedkhan Wongtewan	—	14 October 2020
241	100	Paowalee Pornphimol vs. Suratikan Pakcharoen	—	21 October 2020
242	101	Thierry Mekwattana vs. Wansawang Banpho (Mahahing)	216	28 October 2020

=== Season 4 (2020—21) ===
List of season 4 episodes
No. overall	No. in season	Guest artist(s)	Player order	Original release date
2020
243	1	Trinity	—	4 November 2020
244	2	Mix VKL vs. Mum Jokmok	217	11 November 2020
245	3	Siriporn Yooyord vs. Cocktail	—	18 November 2020
246	4	Singto Numchok vs. Kong Huayrai	—	25 November 2020
247	5	Ble Patumrach R-Siam	218	2 December 2020
248	6	Earnkwan Waranya	219	9 December 2020
249	7	Bell Niphada vs. Lamplern Wongsakorn	220	16 December 2020
250	8	UrboyTJ vs. Twopee (Southside)	—	23 December 2020
2021
251	9	Buaphan Tangso	221	6 January 2021
252	10	Ja R-Siam	222	13 January 2021
253	11	Chaleumpol Tikumpornteerawong vs. Nachat Janthapan	223–224	20 January 2021
254	12	Zack Chumphae vs. Leew Ajareeya Prompruek	—	27 January 2021
255	13	Pakorn Lam vs. Ruangsak Loychusak	—	3 February 2021
256	14	Anuwat Sanguansakpakdee (Peacemaker)	—	10 February 2021
257	15	Chaiya Mitchai	—	17 February 2021
258	16	Kratae R-Siam	225	24 February 2021
259	17	Sutthipong Wattanachan vs. Patcharida Wattana	226–227	3 March 2021
260	18	Jinjett Wattanasin	228	10 March 2021
261	19	Sorn Sinchai vs. Lamyong Nonghinhao	229–230	17 March 2021
262	20	Tai Tanawut vs. Cham Chamrum	—	24 March 2021
263	21	Jaylerr and Paris vs. Billkin and PP Krit	231–232	31 March 2021
264	22	Jaruwat Cheawaram vs. Wichayanee Pearklin	—	7 April 2021
265	23	Jack Thanaphol	233	14 April 2021
266	24	Poyfai Malaiporn vs. Praewpaow Sangthong	234–235	21 April 2021
267	25	Power Pat	236	28 April 2021
268	26	Baitoey R-Siam	237	5 May 2021
269	27	Napat Injaiuea	238	2 June 2021
270	28	Anne Aoradee	239	9 June 2021
271	29	Duangchan Suwannee	240	16 June 2021
272	30	Sprite and Guy Geegee	241–242	7 July 2021
273	31	Kasaem Khomsan	243	14 July 2021
274	32	Sehri Rungsawang	244	21 July 2021
275	33	Pramote Vilehpana	245	28 July 2021
276	34	Phusin Warinrak vs. Wieng Naruemon	246–247	4 August 2021
277	35	4EVE	248	11 August 2021
278	36	Yinglee Seejumphon	—	18 August 2021
279	37	Orawee Sujjanon	249	25 August 2021
280	38	Earnkwan Waranya vs. Paowalee Pornphimol	—	1 September 2021
281	39	Sornram Namphet vs. CD Guntee	250–251	8 September 2021
282	40	Suppasit Jongcheveevat	252	15 September 2021
283	41	Mr. Team	—	22 September 2021
284	42	Tachaya Prathumwan vs. Prangthip Thalaeng	253	29 September 2021
285	43	Lulu and Lala vs. Toey Apiwat	254–255	6 October 2021

=== Season 5 (2021—22) ===
List of season 5 episodes
No. overall	No. in season	Title	Guest artist(s)	Player order	Original release date
2021
286	1	"Pearl of the Orient"	Siriporn Yooyord	—	13 October 2021
287	2	"Cartoon Heroes"	Nuengthida Sophon	—	20 October 2021
288	3	"Halloween Night"	Fon Tanasoontorn	—	27 October 2021
289	4	"Wild West"	Vasu Sangsingkeo	256	3 November 2021
290	5	"Indian Heritage"	Kat English	—	10 November 2021
291	6	"Ayodhya"	Nat Thewphaingam	257	17 November 2021
292	7	"Millennium Party"	Four–Mod	258	24 November 2021
293	8	"Hollywood Stars"	UrboyTJ and Waii Panyarisa	—	1 December 2021
294	9	"Animal Kingdom"	Wichanaya Pearklin	—	8 December 2021
295	10	"Varsity Life"	Somjit Jongjohor	259	15 December 2021
296	11	"Hallyu Wave"	Seo Ji-yeon	260	22 December 2021
297	12	"Workforce"	Jazz Chuanchuen	—	29 December 2021
2022
298	13	"New Year's Ball"	Best Song Contest's Gentlemen	261	5 January 2022
299	14	"Back to School"	Kornpob Janjarearn	—	12 January 2022
300	15	"Space Invaders"	Apiwat Eurthavornsuk	—	19 January 2022
301	16	"Esan Party"	Mum Jokmok	—	26 January 2022
302	17	"Lover Boys"	Oabnithi Wiwattanawarang	262	16 February 2022
303	18	"Lover Girls"	4EVE	—	23 February 2022

=== Season 6 (2023) ===
List of season 6 episodes
No. overall	No. in season	Guest artist(s)	Player order	Original release date
304	1	PP Krit	—	5 July 2023
305	2	Waruntorn Paonil	263	12 July 2023
306	3	Three Man Down	264	19 July 2023
307	4	Proxie	265	26 July 2023
308	5	Milli	266	2 August 2023
309	6	Tilly Birds	267	9 August 2023
310	7	Tanont Chumroen	—	16 August 2023
311	8	4EVE	—	23 August 2023
312	9	Paper Planes	268	30 August 2023
313	10	Jeff Satur	269	6 September 2023
314	11	Atlas	270	13 September 2023
315	12	Phuwasit Anantpornsiri	271	20 September 2023
316	13	Jakkapat Wattanasin	272	27 September 2023
317	14	PiXXiE	273	4 October 2023
318	15	Gemini and Fourth (Nattawat Jirochtikul and Norawit Titicharoenrak)	274–275	11 October 2023
319	16	Chawarin Perdpiriyawong	276	18 October 2023

== Specials ==
List of special episodes
No.	Title	Original release date
1	"Memorial Showcase"	16 November 2016
2	"2016 Yearender Showcase"	28 December 2016
3	"2020 Yearender Showcase"	30 December 2020
4	"Summer Showcase — part 1"	12 May 2021
5	"Summer Showcase — part 2"	19 May 2021
6	"Summer Showcase — part 3"	26 May 2021
7	"Rainy Showcase — part 1"	23 June 2021
8	"Rainy Showcase — part 2"	30 June 2021
9	"Winter Showcase — part 1"	2 February 2022
10	"Winter Showcase — part 2"	9 February 2022
