= I Can See Your Voice Thailand season 3 =

Television game show season

I Can See Your Voice Thailand
- Season 3
- Starring: Nilubon Amonwitthawat; Chinawut Indracusin; Nachat Janthapan; Techin Ploypetch; Mongkol Sa-ardboonyaphat; Jakkawal Saothongyuttitum; Maneenuch Smerasut; Darunee Sutiphitak; Kapol Thongplub; Chaleumpol Tikumpornteerawong; Kiattisak Udomnak; Saranyu Winaipanit
- Hosted by: Somkiat Chanpram; Kan Kantathavorn
- Winners: Good singers: 96; Bad singers: 29
- No. of episodes: 101

Release
- Original network: Workpoint TV
- Original release: 21 November 2018 – 28 October 2020

Season chronology
- ← Previous; Season 2 Next → Season 4

The third season of the Thai television mystery music game show I Can See Your Voice Thailand premiered on Workpoint TV on 21 November 2018. It is also the longest-running season in ICSYV franchise by duration, with 708 days.

During the COVID-19 pandemic, Workpoint TV continues production of the show for this season beginning from the early 2020 episodes, with health and safety protocols being implemented.

== Gameplay ==
=== Formats ===
According to the original South Korean rules, the guest artist(s) must attempt to eliminate bad singers during its game phase. At the final performance, the last remaining mystery singer is revealed as either good or bad by means of a duet between them and one of the guest artists.

For games played under the "battle format" (from Giọng ải giọng ai), two opposing guest artists eliminate one singer each during the proper game phase, and then keep one singer each to join the final performance. The winner is determined by the remaining mystery singers, who are chosen by opposing guest artists, as per specific winning condition depends on the outcome of their final performance, if:

1. One opposing guest artist kept a good singer and the other had a bad singer, or
2. Both opposing guest artists kept good or bad singers.

=== Rounds ===
1. Visual round
  The guest artist is given some time to observe and examine each mystery singer based on their appearance. Afterward, a muted video of each mystery singer that reveals only 0.3 seconds of their singing voice is played as an additional hint.
2. Introduction round
  Each mystery singer self-introduces to guest artist and panelists. Good singers are telling the truth, while bad singers are allowed to lie.
3. Lip sync round
  Each mystery singer performs a lip sync to a song; good singers mime to a recording of their own, while bad singers mime to a backing track by another vocalist.
4. Talent round
  The guest artist must describe one of the mystery singer's other talents, except "singing" itself. This may not be related to the "stage of truth", but depends on their identity.

== Episodes ==
=== Guest artists ===
Legend:
Good singer
Bad singer

2018 games
Episode		Guest artist (Note: Players' note: For the returning guest artists (who also include foreigners and former good singers), names are displayed in italics.)	Winner
#	Date	Guest artist	Winner
1	21 November 2018	Pisanu Nimsakul	Bad
2	28 November 2018	Kanitkul Netbute	Bad
3	5 December 2018	Twopee (Southside)	Good
4	12 December 2018	Jaruwat Cheawaram	Good
5	19 December 2018 26 December 2018	Bodyslam	Good

2019 games
Episode		Guest artist	Winner
#	Date	Guest artist	Winner
6	2 January 2019	Sarunrat Visutthithada	Good
7	9 January 2019	Nine by Nine	Bad
8	16 January 2019	Pitchaya Nitipaisalkul (Golf & Mike)	Bad
9	23 January 2019	Siriporn Ampaipong	Good
10	30 January 2019	The Mousses	Bad
11	6 February 2019	Peter Corp Dyrendal	Good
12	13 February 2019	Nattawat Srimawk	Good
13	20 February 2019	Lukas Graham (Note: Season highlights: Foreign guest artists: Lukas Graham (DNK; ep. 13) and Kim Dong-han (WEi) (ROK; ep. 40); Nuvo (ep. 47) designated as new players, which include the returning Saharat Sangkapreecha and Jirayuth Wattanasin.; Clash designated as new players, which include the returning Preeti Barameeanant.; Both Ball Chernyim and Jazz Chuanchuen ended a bad singer-picked draw under battle format in the Christmas episode, while Cheranut Yusanonda played in the New Year's Day episode.; Getsunova (ep. 96) designated as new players, which include the returning Prakarn Raiva.; Kala (ep. 98) designated as new players, which include the returning Yuthapong Sangsuwan.; Klear (ep. 98) designated as new players, which include the returning Rannaphan Yungyuenpoonchai.)	Good
14	27 February 2019	Lamyai Haithongkham	Good
15	6 March 2019	Pijika Jittaputta	Good
16	13 March 2019	Nittaya Bunsungnoen	Good
17	20 March 2019	Isariya Patharamanop	Bad
18	27 March 2019	Pee Saderd	Good
19	3 April 2019	Jintara Poonlarp	Good
20	10 April 2019	The Parkinson	Good
21	17 April 2019	Suratikan Pakcharoen	Good
22	24 April 2019	Pancake	Good
23	1 May 2019	Chinawut Indracusin	Good
24	8 May 2019	Paowalee Pornphimol	Good
25	15 May 2019	Pakorn Lam	Good
26	22 May 2019	Etcetera	Good
27	29 May 2019	Arak Amornsupasiri	Good
28	5 June 2019	Uthen Phromminh	Good
29	12 June 2019	Rung Suriya	Good
30	19 June 2019	Phusin Warinrak	Good
31	26 June 2019	Saksit Vejsupaporn	Bad
32	3 July 2019	Burin Boonvisut	Good
33	10 July 2019	Nat Myria	Good
34	17 July 2019	Monkan Kankoon	Good
35	24 July 2019	Noknoi Uraiporn	Good
36	31 July 2019	Jingreedkhao Wongtewan	Good
37	7 August 2019	Suparuj Techatanon	Good
38	14 August 2019	Pakkaramai Potranan	Good
39	21 August 2019	Ekkachai Srivichai	Good
40	28 August 2019	Kim Dong-han (WEi)	Good
41	4 September 2019	Lamplern Wongsakorn	Good
42	11 September 2019	Kornpassorn Duaysianklao	Good
43	18 September 2019	Noo Meter	Good
44	25 September 2019	Yuthapong Sangsuwan (Kala)	Good
45	2 October 2019	Kong Huayrai	Bad
46	9 October 2019	Samtone	Good
47	16 October 2019	Nuvo	Good
48	23 October 2019	Mean	Good
49	30 October 2019	Siriporn Yooyord	Good
49	30 October 2019	Sunaree Ratchasima	Bad
50	6 November 2019	Clash	Good
51	13 November 2019	Ekarat Suvarnabhumi	Good
52	20 November 2019	Palitchoke Ayanaputra	Good
53	27 November 2019	Leew Ajareeya Prompruek	Good
54	4 December 2019	Trinity	Good
55	11 December 2019	Fon Tanasoontorn	Good
56	18 December 2019	Ann Mitchai	Good
57	25 December 2019	Ball Chernyim	Bad
57	25 December 2019	Jazz Chuanchuen	Bad

2020 games
Episode		Guest artist	Winner
#	width=190pxDate	Guest artist	Winner
58	1 January 2020	Cheranut Yusanonda	Good
59	8 January 2020	Yingyong Yodbuangam	Bad
59	8 January 2020	Apaporn Nakornsawan	Good
60	15 January 2020	Tono and The Dust	Good
61	22 January 2020	Jenny and Lilly	Good
62	29 January 2020	Apiwat Eurthavornsuk	Good
62	29 January 2020	Atom Chanagun	Bad
63	5 February 2020	Chinawut Indracusin	Good
63	5 February 2020	Isariya Patharamanop	Bad
64	12 February 2020	Pongsak Rattanapong	Good
64	12 February 2020	Rhatha Phongam	Bad
65	19 February 2020	Popetorn Soonthornyanakij	Good
65	19 February 2020	Issara Kitnitchi	Bad
66	26 February 2020	Arm Chutima	Good
66	26 February 2020	Toey Apiwat	Good
67	4 March 2020	Monsit Khamsoi	Good
68	11 March 2020	Choi Rueammit	Good
68	11 March 2020	Poppy Prachyaluk	Good
69	18 March 2020	Thanaporn Wagprayoon	Good
70	25 March 2020	Suthirat Wongtewan	Good
71	1 April 2020	Chetta Chayachang (Hyper)	Good
72	8 April 2020	Jaylerr and Paris	Good
73	15 April 2020	Jittrakorn Boonsorn (I.nam)	Good
74	22 April 2020	Bao Wee	Good
75	29 April 2020	Ying Thitikarn	Good
76	6 May 2020	Yinglee Seejumphon	Bad
77	13 May 2020	Nhong Chachacha	Bad
77	13 May 2020	Theng Therdtherng	Good
78	20 May 2020	Pok Mindset	Good
79	27 May 2020	Super Valentine	Good
80	3 June 2020	Bew Kanlayanee	Good
81	10 June 2020	Kanormjeen Kunlamas	Good
81	10 June 2020	Waii Panyarisa	Good
82	17 June 2020	Lamyai Haithongkham	Bad
83	24 June 2020	Gavin Duval	Bad
83	24 June 2020	Thamthai Phlangsin	Bad
84	1 July 2020	Sompong Kunaprathom	Bad
84	1 July 2020	Takkatan Chonlada	Good
85	8 July 2020	Tanont Chumroen	Good
86	15 July 2020	San Sansin	Good
87	22 July 2020	Darunee Sutiphitak	Good
87	22 July 2020	Thanawat Prasitsomporn	Bad
88	29 July 2020	Oil Saengsin	Good
89	5 August 2020	Dokaor Toongtong	Bad
89	5 August 2020	Kantong Tungngern	Good
90	12 August 2020	Duangta Kongthong	Good
91	19 August 2020	Ratchanok Srilophan	Good
91	19 August 2020	Kowthip Thidadin	Good
92	26 August 2020	Napassorn Phuthornjai and Piyanut Sueajongpru	Good
93	2 September 2020	Yui Yatyer	Bad
93	2 September 2020	Tossapol Himmapan	Good
94	9 September 2020	Aod Fours	Good
95	16 September 2020	Pai Pongsatorn	Good
95	16 September 2020	Tai Orathai	Good
96	23 September 2020	Clash	Good
96	23 September 2020	Getsunova	Bad
97	30 September 2020	Pramote Pathan	Good
97	30 September 2020	Nipaporn Thititanakarn	Good
98	7 October 2020	Kala	Good
98	7 October 2020	Klear	Bad
99	14 October 2020	Rung Suriya	Good
99	14 October 2020	Jingreedkhao Wongtewan	Good
100	21 October 2020	Paowalee Pornphimol	Good
100	21 October 2020	Suratikan Pakcharoen	Bad
101	28 October 2020	Thierry Mekwattana	Good
101	28 October 2020	Wansawang Banpho (Mahahing)	Bad

=== Panelists ===
Legend:
Regular panelist
Additional panelist
Guest panelist

Apps		Panelists in attendance (Sorted by first appearance, with episode designations)
g#	p#	Panelists in attendance (Sorted by first appearance, with episode designations)
100	1	Maneenuch Smerasut (1–4, 6–101)
57	1	Darunee Sutiphitak (1–2, 6–7, 11, 13–20, 28–29, 31–32, 34–39, 44–52, 54, 56–62, 65, 68, 74–79, 82–86, 88–89, 97, 99)
55	1	Techin Ploypetch (3–7, 13, 15–22, 24–25, 28–30, 35–36, 38–39, 42–43, 45–48, 51, 53–55, 57–64, 66, 72, 76, 78–79, 81–83, 88–91, 96–97)
54	1	Jakkawal Saothongyuttitum (6–7, 13–16, 19–24, 28–29, 34–37, 41, 46–48, 50–52, 54, 56, 58, 60–63, 65, 67–68, 71–77, 80–81, 86–89, 92–97)
18	1	Nachat Janthapan (11–12, 31, 33, 45, 53, 55–56, 61–62, 82–85, 88–89, 98–99)
17	2	Chaleumpol Tikumpornteerawong (1–2, 5, 8, 18, 64, 66, 76–77, 82, 84, 86–87, 96–97, 100–101); Kapol Thongplub (7, 16, 20–21, 28, 34, 43, 49, 56–57, 63, 69, 78–79, 85, 87)
16	1	Nilubon Amonwitthawat (4, 12, 25, 31, 33, 39–41, 44, 51–52, 54, 67, 92–93, 98)
13	1	Mongkol Sa-ardboonyaphat (67–68, 70, 73, 77, 80–81, 90–91, 93–94, 98–99)
12	1	Saranyu Winaipanit (10, 19, 22, 30, 33, 40–41, 44–45, 49, 53, 71)
11	1	Chinawut Indracusin (1–2, 10–14, 64–65, 78–79)
10	1	Kiattisak Udomnak (17–18, 25, 36–37, 90–91, 98, 100–101)
9	1	Sudarat Butrprom (23, 52, 70, 73, 80, 86, 90–91, 100)
8	1	Prakpoom Jongmunwattana (1, 4, 9–10, 23, 30, 39)
7	2	Khemmarat Sunthornnon (8–9, 26–27, 65, 71–72); Nalin Hohler (53, 55, 63–64, 87, 94–95)
6	2	Siriporn Yooyord (9, 21–22, 50, 57, 59); Samapon Piyapongsiri (32–33, 40–41, 74, 85)
5	4	Napapa Tantrakul (3, 24, 32, 66, 69); Pisanu Nimsakul (6, 34, 46, 74–75); Rusameekae Fagerlund (11–12, 14, 23, 92); Panupan Jantanawong (70, 94–95, 100–101)
3	3	Benjapol Cheuyaroon (3–4, 31); Apaporn Nakornsawan (30, 48, 59); Kanticha Chumma (71, 80–81)
2	10	Kornkan Sutthikoses (13, 35); Unnop Thongborisut (24, 29); Jirakorn Sompitak and Sakuntala Thianphairot (26–27); Dome Phetthamrongchai (36–37); Phattharawadee Pinthong (42–43); Chirasak Panphum (42, 44); Theng Therdtherng (43, 55); Tachakorn Boonlupyanun (49, 75); Harin Suthamjaras (66, 69)
1	31	Phujhan MC (3); Jazz Chuanchuen, Thikamporn Ritta-apinan, and Inthira Yeunyong (5); Seo Ji-yeon and Yoo Seon-ho (Note: Panelists' note: Foreign attendees: Seo Ji-yeon and Yoo Seon-ho (ROK)) (8); Man Kunjara and Nipaporn Thititanakarn (11); Prachakorn Piyasakulkaew (17); Wongsakorn Poramatthakorn (25); Timethai (26); Gavin Duval (27); Thongpoom Siripipat (32); Joke Chancharoen (So Cool) (38); Nat Thewphaingam (40); Blue Pongtiwat (42); Tanont Chumroen (47); Thanat Loekhunnasombat (50); Mann Pattaphon (60); Witthawat Rattanbarami (67); Pannipa Jirasak (68); Janejira Reabroycharoen (69); Jatupone Chompoonich (70); Karnklao Duaysianklao (72); Kunlamas Sarasart (73); Twopee Southside (83); Prachaya Ruangroj (92); Suppasit Jongcheveevat (93); Apissada Kreurkongka (96); Yingyong Yodbuangam (99); Kornpassorn Duaysianklao (101)
