= I Can See Your Voice Thailand season 4 =

Television game show season

I Can See Your Voice Thailand
- Season 4
- Starring: Nilubon Amonwitthawat; Tachakorn Boonlupyanun; Chinawut Indracusin; Panupan Jantanawong; Mongkol Sa-ardboonyaphat; Jakkawal Saothongyuttitum; Maneenuch Smerasut; Darunee Sutiphitak
- Hosted by: Somkiat Chanpram; Kan Kantathavorn
- Winners: Good singers: 46; Bad singers: 16
- No. of episodes: Regular: 43; Special: 6; Overall: 49

Release
- Original network: Workpoint TV
- Original release: 4 November 2020 – 6 October 2021

Season chronology
- ← Previous; Season 3 Next → Season 5 (as Festival)

The fourth season of the Thai television mystery music game show I Can See Your Voice Thailand premiered on Workpoint TV on 4 November 2020.

At the time of filming during the COVID-19 pandemic, health and safety protocols are also implemented.

== Gameplay ==
=== Formats ===
According to the original South Korean rules, the guest artist(s) must attempt to eliminate bad singers during its game phase. At the final performance, the last remaining mystery singer is revealed as either good or bad by means of a duet between them and one of the guest artists.

For games played under the "battle format" (from Giọng ải giọng ai), two opposing guest artists eliminate one singer each during the proper game phase, and then keep one singer each to join the final performance. The winner is determined by the remaining mystery singers, who are chosen by opposing guest artists, as per specific winning condition depends on the outcome of their final performance, if:

1. One opposing guest artist kept a good singer and the other had a bad singer, or
2. Both opposing guest artists kept good or bad singers.

=== Rounds ===
1. Visual round
  The guest artist is given some time to observe and examine each mystery singer based on their appearance. Afterward, a muted video of each mystery singer that reveals only 0.3 seconds of their singing voice is played as an additional hint.
2. Introduction round
  Each mystery singer self-introduces to guest artist and panelists. Good singers are telling the truth, while bad singers are allowed to lie.
3. Lip sync round
  Each mystery singer performs a lip sync to a song; good singers mime to a recording of their own, while bad singers mime to a backing track by another vocalist.
4. Talent round
  The guest artist must describe one of the mystery singer's other talents, except "singing" itself. This may not be related to the "stage of truth", but depends on their identity.

== Episodes ==
=== Guest artists ===
Legend:
Good singer
Bad singer

2020 games
Episode		Guest artist (Note: Players' note: For the returning guest artists (who also include foreigners and former good singers), names are displayed in italics.)	Winner
#	Date	Guest artist	Winner
1	4 November 2020	Trinity	Good
2	11 November 2020	Mix VKL	Good
2	11 November 2020	Mum Jokmok	Bad
3	18 November 2020	Siriporn Yooyord	Good
3	18 November 2020	Cocktail	Good
4	25 November 2020	Singto Numchok	Good
4	25 November 2020	Kong Huayrai	Bad
5	2 December 2020	Ble Patumrach R-Siam	Bad
6	9 December 2020	Earnkwan Waranya	Good
7	16 December 2020	Bell Niphada	Good
7	16 December 2020	Lamplern Wongsakorn	Good
8	23 December 2020	UrboyTJ	Good
8	23 December 2020	Twopee (Southside)	Bad
Special	30 December 2020	2020 Yearender Showcase	

2021 games
Episode		Guest artist	Winner
#	Date	Guest artist	Winner
9	6 January 2021	Buaphan Tangso	Good
10	13 January 2021	Ja R-Siam	Bad
11	20 January 2021	Chaleumpol Tikumpornteerawong	Good
11	20 January 2021	Nachat Janthapan	Bad
12	27 January 2021	Zack Chumphae	Good
12	27 January 2021	Leew Ajareeya Prompruek	Good
13	3 February 2021	Pakorn Lam	Good
13	3 February 2021	Ruangsak Loychusak	Bad
14	10 February 2021	Anuwat Sanguansakpakdee (Peacemaker)	Good
15	17 February 2021	Chaiya Mitchai	Good
16	24 February 2021	Kratae R-Siam	Bad
17	3 March 2021	Sutthipong Wattanachan	Good
17	3 March 2021	Patcharida Wattana	Good
18	10 March 2021	Jinjett Wattanasin	Bad
19	17 March 2021	Sorn Sinchai	Good
19	17 March 2021	Lamyong Nonghinhao	Good
20	24 March 2021	Tai Tanawut	Good
20	24 March 2021	Cham Chamrum	Bad
21	31 March 2021	Jaylerr and Paris	Good
21	31 March 2021	Billkin and PP Krit	Bad
22	7 April 2021	Jaruwat Cheawaram	Good
22	7 April 2021	Wichayanee Pearklin	Bad
23	14 April 2021	Jack Thanaphol	Good
24	21 April 2021	Poyfai Malaiporn	Good
24	21 April 2021	Praewpaow Sangthong	Good
25	28 April 2021	Power Pat	Bad
26	5 May 2021	Baitoey R-Siam	Bad
Special	12 May 2021	Summer Showcase	
Special	19 May 2021	Summer Showcase	
Special	26 May 2021	Summer Showcase	
27	2 June 2021	Napat Injaiuea	Good
28	9 June 2021	Anne Aoradee	Good
29	16 June 2021	Duangchan Suwannee	Good
Special	23 June 2021	Rainy Showcase	
Special	30 June 2021	Rainy Showcase	
30	7 July 2021	Sprite and Guy Geegee	Good
31	14 July 2021	Kasaem Khomsan	Good
32	21 July 2021	Sehri Rungsawang	Good
33	28 July 2021	Pramote Vilehpana	Good
34	4 August 2021	Phusin Warinrak	Good
34	4 August 2021	Wieng Naruemon	Good
35	11 August 2021	4EVE	Good
36	18 August 2021	Yinglee Seejumphon	Good
37	25 August 2021	Orawee Sujjanon	Good
38	1 September 2021	Earnkwan Waranya	Good
38	1 September 2021	Paowalee Pornphimol	Bad
39	8 September 2021	Sornram Namphet	Good
39	8 September 2021	CD Guntee	Good
40	15 September 2021	Suppasit Jongcheveevat	Good
41	22 September 2021	Mr. Team	Good
42	29 September 2021	Tachaya Prathumwan	Good
42	29 September 2021	Prangthip Thalaeng	Good
43	6 October 2021	Lulu and Lala	Good
43	6 October 2021	Toey Apiwat	Bad

=== Panelists ===
Legend:
Regular panelist
Additional panelist
Guest panelist

Apps		Panelists in attendance (Sorted by first appearance, with episode designations)
g#	p#	Panelists in attendance (Sorted by first appearance, with episode designations)
41	1	Maneenuch Smerasut (1–10, 13–43)
33	1	Jakkawal Saothongyuttitum (1–2, 4, 6–10, 15–22, 27–43)
21	1	Mongkol Sa-ardboonyaphat (1, 3–4, 6–7, 9–12, 16–17, 24–26, 30–35, 42–43)
16	1	Darunee Sutiphitak (1–2, 8–10, 13, 18–19, 21, 26, 34–35, 38–39, 41–43)
15	1	Panupan Jantanawong (12, 15–16, 21–22, 26–31, 34–35, 38–39)
11	2	Chinawut Indracusin (3, 5, 13–14, 25, 27–28, 32–33, 36–37); Nilubon Amonwitthawat (3, 7, 12, 16, 20, 22, 27–29, 40, 42)
10	1	Tachakorn Boonlupyanun (8–9, 11–12, 18–19, 25–26, 40–41)
8	1	Kiattisak Udomnak (3, 5, 14, 19–20, 36, 40–41)
6	1	Khemmarat Sunthornnon (20, 32, 38–39, 42–43)
4	1	Techin Ploypetch (1–2, 13–14)
3	2	Kapol Thongplub (2–3, 15); Saranyu Winaipanit (22, 29, 37)
2	9	Theng Therdtherng (1, 23); Samapon Piyapongsiri (4–5); Nalin Hohler (4, 6); Siriporn Yooyord (5, 14); Nachat Janthapan (7, 10); Kiat Kridcharoen (8, 23); Chaleumpol Tikumpornteerawong (17–18); Rusameekae Fagerlund (23–24); Fon Tanasoontorn (36–37)
1	17	Pisanu Nimsakul (6); Sudarat Butrprom, P-Hot, and Arachaporn Pokinpakorn (11); Rung Suriya (12); Tai Tanawut (13); Napapa Tantrakul (15); Puttachat Pongsuchat (17); Thanawat Prasitsomporn (21); Candy Rakkaen (23); Pee Saderd and Thansita Suwatcharathanakit (24); Aeh Jirakorn and Yardphirun (25); Thanat Lowkhunsombat (30); Kanticha Chumma (31); Nida Patcharawirapong (33)
