= The Mask Thai Descendant =

- Also known as: The Mask Thai Descendant
- Genre: Reality television
- Presented by: Kan Kantathavorn
- Country of origin: Thailand
- Original language: Thai

Production
- Camera setup: Multi-camera
- Running time: 105 minutes
- Production company: Workpoint Entertainment

Original release
- Network: Workpoint TV
- Release: 28 May – 3 September 2020

Related
- Temple Fair; Mask Singer 12; King of Mask Singer

The Mask Thai Descendant (Thai: เดอะแมสก์ ลูกไทย) was the eleventh season of The Mask Singer, a Thai singing competition program presented by Kan Kantathavorn. The program aired on Workpoint TV on Thursday at 20:05 from 28 May 2020 to 3 September 2020.

The tournament format was similar to that of The Mask Line Thai and The Mask Thai Literature. But the difference was that this season was combined with Thai heritage, wisdom, culture and tradition.

== Panel of Judges ==
No.	Name	Profession
1	Maneenuch Smerasut	Singing Teacher
2	Kiattisak Udomnak	MC
3	Jakkawal Saothongyuttitum	Music Producer, Composer
4	Thanawat Prasitsomporn	MC
5	Apissada Kreurkongka	Actress, Model
6	Yutthana Boon-aom	Music Company Executive
7	Siriporn Yooyord	Comedienne, Singer
8	Suthirat Wongtewan	Singer, Likay Actor
9	Sitang Buathong	Net Idol
10	Chonlada Thongchulklang	Singer
11	Ekachai Srivichai	Singer, Actor, Film Director
12	Lamyai Haithongkham	Singer

== First round ==
=== Mai Ek ===
Order	Episode	Stage Name	Song	Identity	Profession	Result
1	EP.1	Jasmine Rice	ร้องไห้หาพ่อเธอหรือ	Undisclosed		Advanced to Semi-Final
1	EP.1	Tom Yam Kung	ตอบได้ไหมว่า...ได้ไหม	Chanon Santinatornkul	Actor, Singer	Eliminated
1	EP.1	Krathong Sai	นอกสายตา	Undisclosed		Advanced to Semi-Final
1	EP.1	Special Show: ผมรักเมืองไทย (I Love You Thailand) (Performed by Jasmine Rice, Tom Yam Kung and Krathong Sai)				
2	EP.2	Mortar	ทั้งรู้ก็รัก	Thongchai Thongkanthom	Actor	Eliminated
2	EP.2	Baci	ผู้ชายห่วย ๆ	Undisclosed		Advanced to Semi-Final
2	EP.2	Yi Peng Lantern	Good Morning Teacher	Undisclosed		Advanced to Semi-Final
2	EP.2	Special Show: เรี่ยมเร้เรไร (Performed by Suthirat Wongtewan)				
2	EP.2	Special Show: บ่กล้าบอกครู (แต่หนูกล้าบอกอ้าย) (Performed by Mortar, Baci and Yi Peng Lantern)				

=== Mai Tho ===
Order	Episode	Stage Name	Song	Identity	Profession	Result
1	EP.3	Nora (Green)	กอดเสาเถียง	Undisclosed		Advanced to Semi-Final
1	EP.3	Nora (Purple)	กอดเสาเถียง	Undisclosed		Advanced to Semi-Final
1	EP.3	Banana Tree Horse	พักก่อน	Janet Keaw	Singer, Actress	Eliminated
1	EP.3	Kason	ผู้หญิงลืมยาก	Undisclosed		Advanced to Semi-Final
2	EP.4	Khene	เขียนฝันไว้ข้างฝา	Undisclosed		Advanced to Semi-Final
2	EP.4	Bo Sang Umbrella	ล่องแม่ปิง	Marie Eugenie Le Lay	Singer, Actress, YouTuber	Eliminated
2	EP.4	Thai Rocket	วันที่ไม่มีเธอ	Undisclosed		Advanced to Semi-Final
2	EP.4	Special Show: จั๊กกิ้มกับต๊กโต (Performed by Khene, Bo Sang Umbrella and Thai Rocket)				

=== Mai Tri ===
Order	Episode	Stage Name	Song	Identity	Profession	Result
1	EP.5	Buffalo Kite	ผู้ชายในฝัน	Danupha Kanateerakul	Singer, Rapper, Dancer	Eliminated
1	EP.5	Bamboo Sticky Rice	ประติมากรรมน้ำแข็ง	Undisclosed		Advanced to Semi-Final
1	EP.5	Phraewa Silk	ไปต่อหรือพอส่ำนี่	Undisclosed		Advanced to Semi-Final
1	EP.5	Special Show: หนุ่มบาว สาวปาน (Performed by Buffalo Kite, Bamboo Sticky Rice and Phraewa Silk)				
2	EP.6	Wanon	หัวใจกระดาษ	Nui Chernyim	Comedian, MC, Director	Eliminated
2	EP.6	Songkran	iควาย	Undisclosed		Advanced to Semi-Final
2	EP.6	Rishi Datton	วาฬเกยตื้น	Undisclosed		Advanced to Semi-Final
2	EP.6	Special Show: ภูมิแพ้กรุงเทพ (Performed by Wanon, Songkran and Rishi Datton)				

== Semi-final ==
=== Mai Ek ===
Order	Episode	Stage Name	Song	Identity	Profession	Result
1	EP.7	Krathong Sai	ฟ้าเปลี่ยนสี	Zeenam Soonthorn	Singer, Actress	Eliminated
1	EP.7	Jasmine Rice	อวยพรน้องเพ็ญ	Ruammit Kongchatree	Singer	Eliminated
1	EP.7	Yi Peng Lantern	ปล่อย	Undisclosed		Advanced to Final
1	EP.7	Baci	แค่คนคุย	Undisclosed		Advanced to Final

=== Mai Tho ===
Order	Episode	Stage Name	Song	Identity	Profession	Result
1	EP.8	Khene	ใจสารภาพ	Palaphol Pholkongseng	Singer	Eliminated
1	EP.8	Kason	รักไม่ต้องการเวลา	Lalita Singtothong	Singer	Eliminated
1	EP.8	Thai Rocket	สิมาฮักหยังตอนนี้	Undisclosed		Advanced to Final
1	EP.8	Nora (Green)	ขอโทษ	Undisclosed		Advanced to Final
1	EP.8	Nora (Purple)	ขอโทษ	Undisclosed		Advanced to Final

=== Mai Tri ===
Order	Episode	Stage Name	Song	Identity	Profession	Result
1	EP.9	Bamboo Sticky Rice	18 ฝน	Undisclosed		Advanced to Final
1	EP.9	Phraewa Silk	บ่เป็นหยังเขาเข้าใจ	Maylada Susri	Singer, Actress, Model, MC	Eliminated
1	EP.9	Rishi Datton	งานเต้นรำในคืนพระจันทร์เต็มดวง	Undisclosed		Advanced to Final
1	EP.9	Songkran	ขอเพียงที่พักใจ	Yui Yatyer	Singer	Eliminated
1	EP.9	Special Show: โคราชบ้านฉัน (Performed by Chonlada Thongchulklang)				

== Final ==
Group	Episode	Stage Name	Song	Identity	Profession	Result
Mai Ek	EP.10	Yi Peng Lantern	มานอนนาเด้อ (Collab Version)	Sara Hohler	Singer, Actress, MC, Dancer, YouTuber	Eliminated
Mai Ek	EP.10	Baci	ถึงเวลาต้องเรียนรู้	Undisclosed		Advanced to Champ VS Champ
Mai Ek	EP.10	Special Show: หมากัด (Covered by Ekachai Srivichai, Yi Peng Lantern and Baci)				
Mai Tho	EP.11	Thai Rocket	โกหกหน้าตาย	Apiwat Boonanak	Singer, Teacher	Eliminated
Mai Tho	EP.11	Nora (Green)	อสูรกาย	Undisclosed		Advanced to Champ VS Champ
Mai Tho	EP.11	Nora (Purple)	อสูรกาย	Undisclosed		Advanced to Champ VS Champ
Mai Tho	EP.11	Trio: คือเธอใช่ไหม (Collab Version)				
Mai Tri	EP.12	Bamboo Sticky Rice	โบว์รักสีดำ	Undisclosed		Advanced to Champ VS Champ
Mai Tri	EP.12	Rishi Datton	ฉันดีใจที่มีเธอ	Piyapong Lekprayoon	Singer	Eliminated
Mai Tri	EP.12	Special Show: ผู้สาวขาเลาะ (Covered by Lamyai Haithongkham, Rishi Datton and Bamboo Sticky Rice)				

== Champ VS Champ ==
Episode	Champ from group	Stage Name	Song	Identity	Profession	Result
EP.13	Mai Ek	Baci	เปรต(สัมภเวสี)	Undisclosed		Advanced to Champ of the Champ
EP.13	Mai Tho	Nora (Green)	อย่าลืมโนราห์	Ratchanok Suwannaket	Singing Duo	Eliminated
EP.13	Mai Tho	Nora (Purple)	อย่าลืมโนราห์	Nareenat Chaealaem	Singing Duo	Eliminated
EP.13	Mai Tri	Bamboo Sticky Rice	สยามเมืองยิ้ม	Undisclosed		Advanced to Champ of the Champ
Special Show: เชื่อเถอะครับ + พูดอีกที (Performed by Baci, Nora (Green), Nora (Purple) and Bamboo Sticky Rice)

== Champ of the Champ ==
Episode	Champ from group	Stage Name	Song	Identity	Profession	Result
EP.14	Mai Ek	Baci	กอด + ผีเสื้อสมุทร (รักเกินจะหักใจ)	Earnkwan Warunya	Singer	Runner-up
EP.14	Mai Tri	Bamboo Sticky Rice	ค่าน้ำนม + แม่	Ble Patumrach	Singer	Champion
EP.14	Special Show: รัตนโกสินทร์เรืองรอง (Performed by Baci, Bamboo Sticky Rice and Judges)					

== Elimination table ==
Contestant	Identity	Ep.1	Ep.2	Ep.3	Ep.4	Ep.5	Ep.6	Ep.7	Ep.8	Ep.9	Ep.10	Ep.11	Ep.12	Ep.13	Ep. 14
Bamboo Sticky Rice	Ble Patumrach	—N/a	—N/a	—N/a	—N/a	SAFE	—N/a	—N/a	—N/a	SAFE	—N/a	—N/a	WIN	SAFE	Winner
Baci	Earnkwan Warunya	—N/a	SAFE	—N/a	—N/a	—N/a	—N/a	SAFE	—N/a	—N/a	WIN	—N/a	—N/a	SAFE	Runner-up
Nora (Green) & Nora (Purple)	Ratchanok Suwannaket & Nareenat Chaealaem	—N/a	—N/a	SAFE	—N/a	—N/a	—N/a	—N/a	SAFE	—N/a	—N/a	WIN	—N/a	OUT	
Rishi Datton	Piyapong Lekprayoon	—N/a	—N/a	—N/a	—N/a	—N/a	SAFE	—N/a	—N/a	SAFE	—N/a	—N/a	OUT		
Thai Rocket	Toey Apiwat	—N/a	—N/a	—N/a	SAFE	—N/a	—N/a	—N/a	SAFE	—N/a	—N/a	OUT			
Yi Peng Lantern	Sara Hohler	—N/a	SAFE	—N/a	—N/a	—N/a	—N/a	SAFE	—N/a	—N/a	OUT				
Phraewa Silk	Bow Maylada	—N/a	—N/a	—N/a	—N/a	SAFE	—N/a	—N/a	—N/a	OUT					
Songkran	Yui Yatyer	—N/a	—N/a	—N/a	—N/a	—N/a	SAFE	—N/a	—N/a	OUT					
Kason	Ney Lalita	—N/a	—N/a	SAFE	—N/a	—N/a	—N/a	—N/a	OUT						
Khene	Phon Palaphol	—N/a	—N/a	—N/a	SAFE	—N/a	—N/a	—N/a	OUT						
Krathong Sai	Zeenam Soonthorn	SAFE	—N/a	—N/a	—N/a	—N/a	—N/a	OUT							
Jasmine Rice	Joy Ruammit	SAFE	—N/a	—N/a	—N/a	—N/a	—N/a	OUT							
Wanon	Nui Chernyim	—N/a	—N/a	—N/a	—N/a	—N/a	OUT								
Buffalo Kite	Milli	—N/a	—N/a	—N/a	—N/a	OUT									
Bo Sang Umbrella	Zom Marie	—N/a	—N/a	—N/a	OUT										
Banana Tree Horse	Janet Keaw	—N/a	—N/a	OUT											
Mortar	Pingpong Thongchai	—N/a	OUT												
Tom Yam Kung	Non Chanon	OUT													

This contestant won the battle and moved on to the next round.
This contestant is safe from elimination.
This contestant is eliminated.
