= I Can See Your Voice Thailand season 5 =

Television game show season

I Can See Your Voice Thailand
- Season 5
- Starring: Maneenuch Smerasut
- Hosted by: Somkiat Chanpram; Kan Kantathavorn
- Winners: Good singers: 18; Bad singers: 0
- No. of episodes: Regular: 18; Special: 2; Overall: 20

Release
- Original network: Workpoint TV
- Original release: 13 October 2021 – 23 February 2022

Season chronology
- ← Previous; Season 4 Next → Season 6 (as T-pop)

The fifth season of the Thai television mystery music game show I Can See Your Voice Thailand premiered on Workpoint TV on 13 October 2021. In celebration of its fifth anniversary, the season was subtitled as Festival, featuring a concept of randomised theme applying to an entire cast, mystery singers, and the stage itself. It also concluded a six-year continuous broadcast of its first run after airing 313 episodes on weekly scheduling.

== Gameplay ==
=== Format ===
According to the original South Korean rules, the guest artist(s) must attempt to eliminate bad singers during its game phase. At the final performance, the last remaining mystery singer is revealed as either good or bad by means of a duet between them and one of the guest artists.

=== Rounds ===
1. Visual round
  The host is given three "keywords" depending on the mystery singer's identity. Afterward, five different voice snippets from the muted video are being played.
2. Introduction round
  Each mystery singer self-introduces to guest artist and panelists. Good singers are telling the truth, while bad singers are allowed to lie.
3. Lip sync round
  All of mystery singers perform their lip sync on separate phases, with the good singers' recordings first, and then the bad singers last.
4. 1. Talent round (episodes 1—8)
  The guest artist must describe one of the mystery singer's other talents, except "singing" itself. This may not be related to the "stage of truth", but depends on their identity.
4. 2. Evidence round (episodes 9—18)
  The guest artist must assign three "mystery songs" to one of the mystery singers of their chosen. Afterward, they must react toward that song.

== Episodes ==
=== Guest artists ===
Legend:
Good singer
Bad singer

2021 episodes
Episode		Theme	Guest artist (Note: Players' note: For the returning guest artists (who also include foreigners and former good singers), names are displayed in italics.)	Winner
#	Date	Theme	Guest artist	Winner
1	13 October 2021	"Pearl of the Orient"	Siriporn Yooyord	Good
2	20 October 2021	"Cartoon Heroes"	Nuengthida Sophon	Good
3	27 October 2021	"Halloween Night"	Fon Tanasoontorn	Good
4	3 November 2021	"Wild West"	Vasu Sangsingkeo	Good
5	10 November 2021	"Indian Heritage"	Kat English	Good
6	17 November 2021	"Ayodhya"	Nat Thewphaingam	Good
7	24 November 2021	"Millennium Party"	Four–Mod	Good
8	1 December 2021	"Hollywood Stars"	UrboyTJ and Waii Panyarisa	Good
9	8 December 2021	"Animal Kingdom"	Wichayanee Pearklin	Good
10	15 December 2021	"Varsity Life"	Somjit Jongjohor	Good
11	22 December 2021	"Hallyu Wave"	Seo Ji-yeon (Note: Highlight: Foreign guest artist: Seo Ji-yeon (ROK; ep. 11))	Good
12	29 December 2021	"Workforce"	Jazz Chuanchuen	Good

2022 games
Episode		Theme	Guest artist	Winner
#	Date	Theme	Guest artist	Winner
13	5 January 2022	"New Year's Ball"	Best Song Contest's Gentlemen	Good
14	12 January 2022	"Back to School"	Kornpob Janjarearn	Good
15	19 January 2022	"Space Invaders"	Apiwat Eurthavornsuk	Good
16	26 January 2022	"Esan Party"	Mum Jokmok	Good
Special	2 February 2022	Winter Showcase		
Special	9 February 2022	Winter Showcase		
17	16 February 2022	"Lover Boys"	Oabnithi Wiwattanawarang	Good
18	23 February 2022	"Lover Girls"	4EVE	Good

=== Panelists ===
Legend:
Regular panelist
Guest panelist

Apps		Panelists in attendance (Sorted by first appearance, with episode designations)
g#	p#	Panelists in attendance (Sorted by first appearance, with episode designations)
16	1	Maneenuch Smerasut (1–16)
8	2	Jakkawal Saothongyuttitum (1–4, 7–10); Mongkol Sa-ardboonyaphat (4–7, 9–10, 15, 17)
7	1	Techin Ploypetch (3–4, 7–8, 12–13, 15)
6	2	Darunee Sutiphitak (1–2, 4, 10, 15, 18); Panupan Jantanawong (2–3, 11, 13–14, 17)
4	1	Suphathat Ophat (1, 6, 12, 16); Nilubon Amonwitthawat (3, 8–9, 13)
3	3	Tachakorn Boonlupyanun (2, 11, 14); Kiattisak Udomnak (5–6, 17); Nalin Hohler (11, 14, 18)
2	2	Thanawat Prasitsomporn (1, 18); Sudarat Butrprom (11, 14)
1	13	Lamyai Haithongkham and Toey Jackarin (5); Paowalee Pornphimol (6); Ja R-Siam (7); Ball Chernyim and Punnasa Phromyot (12); Utain Prommin (13); Choi Rueammit, Jack Thanaphol, and Yardphirun (16); Harin Suthamjaras (17); Pimchanok Ponlabhun and Seo Ji-yeon (Note: Panelists' note: Foreign attendee: Seo Ji-yeon (ROK)) (18)
