= I Can See Your Voice Thailand =

Thai television game show

- Thai: นักร้องซ่อนแอบ; RTGS: Nak rong son aep
- Literally: Secret singers
- Genre: Game show
- Based on: I Can See Your Voice by CJ ENM
- Presented by: Somkiat Chanpram; Kan Kantathavorn
- Starring: The celebrity panelists (see cast)
- Country of origin: Thailand
- Original language: Thai
- No. of seasons: 6
- No. of episodes: Regular: 319; Special: 10; Overall: 329

Production
- Camera setup: Multi-camera
- Production company: Workpoint Entertainment

Original release
- Network: Workpoint TV
- Release: 13 January 2016 – 18 October 2023

Related
- I Can See Your Voice franchise

I Can See Your Voice Thailand is a Thai television mystery music game show based on the South Korean programme of the same title, featuring its format where guest artist(s) attempt to eliminate bad singers from the group, until the last mystery singer remains for a duet performance. Also as the first country to air a locally-produced adaptation, it premiered on Workpoint TV on 13 January 2016.

== Gameplay ==
=== Format ===
Over the course of four rounds, the guest artist(s) must attempt to eliminate bad singers from a group of "mystery singers", identified only by their occupation or alias, without ever hearing them perform live. They are assisted by clues regarding the singers' backgrounds, style of performance, and observations from a celebrity panel. At the end of a game, the last remaining mystery singer is revealed as either good or bad by means of a duet between them and one of the guest artists. (Note: Gameplay note: The number of mystery singers are set to six (for the 6th season) or seven (from 1st to 5th season).)

For games played under the "battle format" (from Giọng ải giọng ai; seasons 3–4), two opposing guest artists eliminate one singer each during the proper game phase, and then keep one singer each to join the final performance. The winner is determined by the remaining mystery singers, who are chosen by opposing guest artists, as per specific winning condition depends on the outcome of their final performance, if:

1. One opposing guest artist kept a good singer and the other had a bad singer, or
2. Both opposing guest artists kept good or bad singers.

=== Rounds ===
==== Visual rounds ====
- s1–4, 6: The guest artist is given some time to observe and examine each mystery singer based on their appearance. Afterward, a muted video of each mystery singer that reveals only 0.3 seconds of their singing voice is played as an additional hint.
- s5: The host is given three "keywords" depending on the mystery singer's identity. Afterward, five different voice snippets from the muted video are being played.

==== Introduction round ====
- s1–5: Each mystery singer self-introduces to guest artist and panelists. Good singers are telling the truth, while bad singers are allowed to lie.

==== Lip sync rounds ====
- s1–4, 6: Each mystery singer performs a lip sync to a song; good singers mime to a recording of their own, while bad singers mime to a backing track by another vocalist.
- s5: All of mystery singers perform their lip sync on separate phases, with the good singers' recordings first, and then the bad singers last.

==== Evidence round ====
- s5: The guest artist must assign three "mystery songs" to one of the mystery singers of their chosen. Afterward, they must react toward that song.

==== Interrogation round ====
- s1–2, 6: The guest artist (and then panelists) may ask questions to the remaining mystery singers. Good singers are required to give truthful responses, while the bad singers must lie.

==== Talent round ====
- s1–6: The guest artist must describe one of the mystery singer's other talents, except "singing" itself. This may not be related to the "stage of truth", but depends on their identity.

== Production ==
BNT News provisionally announced a Thai adaptation of I Can See Your Voice, at the time when (South Korean) second season of the same title premiered on 22 October 2015; this was subsequently confirmed by Workpoint Entertainment in January 2016.

== Broadcast history ==
I Can See Your Voice Thailand debuted on 13 January 2016, with filming taking place at the in-house Workpoint Studio in Mueang Pathum Thani district. Following the death of King of Thailand Bhumibol Adulyadej, the show was preempted of airing — with the first season from mid-October to mid-November, followed by a Memorial Showcase special on 16 November 2016; and then the second season for second half of October. In a crossover with The Masked Singer, first season winner Issara Kitnitchi was played on 10 May 2017. One week after first season finale, a second season immediately premiered on 16 August 2017. (Note: Highlight: Got7 (s2 ep. 1) also returned on their 2nd game as foreigners, when they last played for the original South Korean 4th season.)

One week after second season finale, the series continued with a third season premiering on 21 November 2018. Ahead of their then-upcoming live tour in Bangkok, Danish pop band Lukas Graham played as a guest artist on the 20 February 2019 episode. Trinity played in the fourth season premiere on 4 November 2020, in co-production and collaboration with Bigo Live; this also conducted an in-game event I Can Show my Voice. At that time during the COVID-19 pandemic, Workpoint TV continued production of the show with health and safety protocols implemented.

In celebration of the show's fifth anniversary, a subsequent season (subtitled Festival) premiered on 13 October 2021, featuring a concept of randomised theme applying to an entire cast, mystery singers, and the stage itself. 4EVE went on to play for its finale on 23 February 2022, and thus formally concluding the six-year continuous broadcast that had aired for 313 episodes.

In May 2023, Workpoint TV renewed the series for a sixth season with its subtitle T-pop (actually featuring guest artists from the Thai pop music genre), which premiered on 5 July 2023. For the first time since third season's late-2019 episodes, spectators are allowed on tapings.

Aside from the regular games, highlight specials that have occasionally aired also include Yearender Showcases (held at the New Year's Eve of 2016 and 2020) and the weather-themed Summer, Rainy and Winter Showcases (from fourth to fifth season).

== Cast ==
The series employs a panel of celebrity "detectives" who assist the guest artists in identifying good and bad mystery singers throughout the game. Along with regular members, guest panelists also appear since the first season. Overall, 19 celebrities have served as panelists, with their original lineup consisting of Thanawat Prasitsomporn, Jakkawal Saothongyuttitum, and Maneenuch Smerasut. Later members who joined the group's duties also include Nilubon Amonwitthawat, Nalin Hohler — from the 1st season; Nattapong Chatipong, Chirasak Panphum, Techin Ploypetch, Darunee Sutiphitak, Kapol Thongplub, Kiattisak Udomnak — from the 2nd season; Chinawut Indracusin, Nachat Janthapan, Mongkol Sa-ardboonyaphat, Chaleumpol Tikumpornteerawong, Saranyu Winaipanit — from the 3rd season; Tachakorn Boonlupyanun, Panupan Jantanawong — from the 4th season; and Warawut Poyim from the 6th season.

Designations:
Main cast member	H Hosting duties
Additional cast member	g# Total games attended, by panelists

Cast member	Seasons					
Cast member	1	2	3	4	5	6
Somkiat Chanpram	H	H	H	H	H	H
Kan Kantathavorn	H	H	H	H	H	H
Nilubon Amonwitthawat	10	12	16	11		
Nalin Hohler	10					12
Thanawat Prasitsomporn	57	13				
Maneenuch Smerasut	64	59	100	41	16	
Jakkawal Saothongyuttitum	74	34	54	33		
Nattapong Chatipong		10				
Chirasak Panphum		13				
Techin Ploypetch		21	55			
Darunee Sutiphitak		24	57	16		10
Kapol Thongplub		11	17			
Kiattisak Udomnak		11	10			
Chinawut Indracusin			11	11		
Nachat Janthapan			18			
Mongkol Sa-ardboonyaphat			13	21		
Chaleumpol Tikumpornteerawong			17			
Saranyu Winaipanit			12			
Tachakorn Boonlupyanun				10		
Panupan Jantanawong				15		
Warawut Poyim						8

== Series overview ==
Series	Episodes	Originally released		Good singers	Bad singers
Series	Episodes	First released	Last released	Good singers	Bad singers
1	77	13 January 2016	9 August 2017	55	22
2	64	16 August 2017	14 November 2018	51	13
3	101	21 November 2018	28 October 2020	96	29
4	43	4 November 2020	6 October 2021	46	16
5	18	13 October 2021	23 February 2022	18	0
6	16	5 July 2023	18 October 2023	10	6
Sp	10	16 November 2016	9 February 2022	—N/a	—N/a

== Accolades ==
Event	Year (Note: Indicates the year of ceremony)	Category	Nominee(s)	Result	Ref(s)
Asian Television Awards	2016	Best Entertainment Host	Kan Kantathavorn	Nominated	
Dara Daily Awards	2016	Best TV Show	I Can See Your Voice Thailand	Nominated	
Dara Daily Awards	2016	Best TV Host	Kan Kantathavorn	Nominated	
Line TV Awards	2020	Best MC	Kan Kantathavorn	Won	
Nataraja Awards	2017	Best Variety Programme	I Can See Your Voice Thailand	Nominated	
Nataraja Awards	2017	Best Host	Kan Kantathavorn	Won	
Nataraja Awards	2018	Best Variety Programme	I Can See Your Voice Thailand	Nominated	
Nataraja Awards	2019	Best Variety Programme	I Can See Your Voice Thailand	Won	
Nataraja Awards	2020	Best Variety Programme	I Can See Your Voice Thailand	Nominated	
