= I Can See Your Voice Thailand season 6 =

Television game show season

I Can See Your Voice Thailand
- Season 6
- Starring: Nalin Hohler; Warawut Poyim; Darunee Sutiphitak
- Hosted by: Somkiat Chanpram; Kan Kantathavorn
- Winners: Good singers: 10; Bad singers: 6
- No. of episodes: 16

Release
- Original network: Workpoint TV
- Original release: 5 July – 18 October 2023

Season chronology
- ← Previous; Season 5 (as Festival)

The sixth season of the Thai television mystery music game show I Can See Your Voice Thailand premiered on Workpoint TV on 5 July 2023. With the season being subtitled as T-pop, it actually features guest artists from the Thai pop music genre.

== Gameplay ==
=== Format ===
According to the original South Korean rules, the guest artist(s) must attempt to eliminate bad singers during its game phase. At the final performance, the last remaining mystery singer is revealed as either good or bad by means of a duet between them and one of the guest artists.

=== Rounds ===
1. Evidence round
  The guest artist is given some time to observe and examine each mystery singer based on their appearance. Afterward, a muted video of each mystery singer that reveals only 0.3 seconds of their singing voice is played as an additional hint.
2. Lip sync round
  Each mystery singer performs a lip sync to a song; good singers mime to a recording of their own, while bad singers mime to a backing track by another vocalist.
3. Interrogation round
  The panelists may ask questions to the remaining mystery singers. Good singers are required to give truthful responses, while the bad singers must lie.
4. Talent round
  The guest artist must describe one of the mystery singer's other talents, except "singing" itself. This may not be related to the "stage of truth", but depends on their identity.

== Episodes ==
=== Guest artists ===
Legend:
Good singer
Bad singer

Episode		Guest artist (Note: Players' note: For the returning guest artists (who also include foreigners and former good singers), names are displayed in italics.)	Winner
#	Date	Guest artist	Winner
1	5 July 2023	PP Krit	Good
2	12 July 2023	Waruntorn Paonil	Good
3	19 July 2023	Three Man Down	Good
4	26 July 2023	Proxie	Bad
5	2 August 2023	Milli	Bad
6	9 August 2023	Tilly Birds	Good
7	16 August 2023	Tanont Chumroen	Good
8	23 August 2023	4EVE	Good
9	30 August 2023	Paper Planes	Bad
10	6 September 2023	Jeff Satur	Good
11	13 September 2023	Atlas	Good
12	20 September 2023	Phuwasit Anantpornsiri	Bad
13	27 September 2023	Jakkapat Wattanasin	Good
14	4 October 2023	PiXXiE	Bad
15	11 October 2023	Gemini and Fourth (Norawit Titicharoenrak and Nattawat Jirochtikul)	Bad
16	18 October 2023	Chawarin Perdpiriyawong	Good

=== Panelists ===
Legend:
Regular panelist
Guest panelist

Apps		Panelists in attendance (Sorted by first appearance, with episode designations)
g#	p#	Panelists in attendance (Sorted by first appearance, with episode designations)
12	1	Nalin Hohler (1–5, 7–11, 14, 16)
10	1	Darunee Sutiphitak (2, 5–6, 8, 10–13, 15–16)
8	1	Warawut Poyim (3–4, 6, 8, 10–11, 14–15)
6	4	Panupan Jantanawong (1–2, 6, 8, 12, 15); Nattapong Chatipong (2, 5, 9, 12–13, 16); Pongsak Rattanapong (3–4, 7, 9–11); Nipaporn Thititanakarn (3–4, 6–9)
5	1	Techin Ploypetch (2, 9–12)
3	1	Thongchai Thongkantom (13–15)
2	2	Kanticha Chumma (4–5); Vasin Asvanarunat (13–14)
1	14	Aek Chalisa, Eclair Juepak, Sarin Ronnakiat, and Oabnithi Wiwattanawarang (1); Napapa Tantrakul (3); Champ Maiyarap (5); Mongkol Sa-ardboonyaphat (6); Pramote Pathan and Pongkol Suebsung (7); Tanasak Thanomsit (12); Jaruwat Cheawaram (14); Tachakorn Boonlupyanun (15); Kornthas Rujeerattanavorapan and Natasit Uareksit (16)
