= The Mask Temple Fair =

- Also known as: The Mask Temple Fair
- Genre: Reality television
- Presented by: Kan Kantathavorn
- Country of origin: Thailand
- Original language: Thai

Production
- Camera setup: Multi-camera
- Running time: 105 minutes
- Production company: Workpoint Entertainment

Original release
- Network: Workpoint TV
- Release: February 13 – May 21, 2020

Related
- Mirror; Thai Descendant; King of Mask Singer

The Mask Temple Fair (Thai: เดอะแมสก์ งานวัด) was the tenth season of The Mask Singer, a Thai singing competition program presented by Kan Kantathavorn. The program aired on Workpoint TV on Thursdays at 20:05 from 13 February 2020 to 21 May 2020.

The tournament format was similar to that of The Mask Project A. But the difference was that this season was combined with temple fair.

== Panel of Judges ==
No.	Name	Profession
1	Thanawat Prasitsomporn	MC
2	Apissada Kreurkongka	Actress, Model
3	Maneenuch Smerasut	Singing Teacher
4	Nalin Hohler	Singer, Actress
5	Kiattisak Udomnak	MC
6	Jakkawal Saothongyuttitum	Music Producer, Composer
7	Siriporn Yooyord	Comedienne, Singer
8	Yutthana Boon-aom	Music Company Executive
9	Saranyu Winaipanit	Singer, Actor, Voice Actor
10	Rangsan Panyaruen	Singer, Actor
11	Pexky Sretunya	Actress, MC
12	Rassamee Fahkuelon	Actor, MC, Model

== First round ==
=== Group 1 ===
Order	Episode	Stage Name	Song	Identity	Profession	Result
1	EP.1	Haunted House	ทหารพิการรัก	Cham Chamrum	Singer, Actor	Eliminated
1	EP.1	Balloon Darts	ยาม	Undisclosed		Advanced to Semi-Final
1	EP.1	Carousel	เสียใจแต่ไม่แคร์ (Whatever)	Undisclosed		Advanced to Semi-Final
1	EP.1	Special Show: งานวัด (Covered by the judges)				
2	EP.2	Cotton Candy	อยากให้รู้ว่ารักเธอ	Pa Ted Yutthana	Music Company Executive	Eliminated
2	EP.2	Poor Man's Pancake	ลงเอย	Undisclosed		Advanced to Semi-Final
2	EP.2	Dunk Tank	คน ๆ นี้จะไม่ไปจากเธอ	Undisclosed		Advanced to Semi-Final

=== Group 2 ===
Order	Episode	Stage Name	Song	Identity	Profession	Result
1	EP.3	Wall of Death	ซมซาน	Jeep Vasu	Singer, Actor, Host	Eliminated
1	EP.3	Fireworks	คนใจอ่อน (อ่อนใจ)	Undisclosed		Advanced to Semi-Final
1	EP.3	Ice Pop	ให้เคอรี่มาส่งได้บ่	Undisclosed		Advanced to Semi-Final
1	EP.3	Special Show: เจ้าภาพจงเจริญ (Covered by the judges)				
2	EP.4	Ferris Wheel	กินอะไรถึงสวย	Nhong ChaChaCha	Comedian	Eliminated
2	EP.4	Snake Wife	"วิท'ลัย" หลายใจ + รักแท้ในคืนหลอกลวง	Undisclosed		Advanced to Semi-Final
2	EP.4	String Lights	ขอคืน	Undisclosed		Advanced to Semi-Final}
2	EP.4	Special Show: คนไทยหัวใจสามช่า (Covered by Ruammit Kongchatree, Prachyaluck Chotwuttinan, Wongsatorn Somsri, and Chonpipat Choosang)				

=== Group 3 ===
Order	Episode	Stage Name	Song	Identity	Profession	Result
1	EP.5	Bingo	ขวัญใจพี่หลวง	Undisclosed		Advanced to Semi-Final
1	EP.5	Lucky Draw	คนที่ไม่เข้าตา	Fahsai Paweensuda	Model, DJ	Eliminated
1	EP.5	Floating Balloon	รักคนมีเจ้าของ	Undisclosed		Advanced to Semi-Final
1	EP.5	Special Show: โป๊ง โป๊ง ชึ่ง (Covered by Bingo, Lucky Draw and Floating Balloon)				
2	EP.6	Grilled Meatballs	เทพธิดาผ้าซิ่น	Thanom Sarm Tone	Singer, Actor	Eliminated
2	EP.6	Rolled Squid	กระเป๋าแบนแฟนทิ้ง	Undisclosed		Advanced to Semi-Final
2	EP.6	Bumper Car	ยอมจำนนฟ้าดิน	Undisclosed		Advanced to Semi-Final

== Semi-final ==
=== Group 1 ===
Order	Episode	Stage Name	Song	Identity	Profession	Result
1	EP.7	Poor Man's Pancake	ก่อนฤดูฝน (Before Rain)	Nittaya Bunsungnoen	Singer	Eliminated
1	EP.7	Dunk Tank	โธ่เอ๊ย + รักต้องเปิด (แน่นอก) (Splash Out)	Grace Karnklao	Actor, Singer	Eliminated
1	EP.7	Carousel	ฝนตกไหม	Undisclosed		Advanced to Final
1	EP.7	Balloon Darts	อยู่บ่ได้	Undisclosed		Advanced to Final

=== Group 2 ===
Order	Episode	Stage Name	Song	Identity	Profession	Result
1	EP.8	String Lights	ตัดใจ	Patcha Anek-ayuwat	Singer, Actress, DJ	Eliminated
1	EP.8	Snake Wife	Hello Mama + ทางกลับบ้าน	Undisclosed		Advanced to Final
1	EP.8	Fireworks	รู้ยัง	Undisclosed		Advanced to Final
1	EP.8	Ice Pop	สิ่งมีชีวิตที่คิดได้และเจ็บเป็น	Mook Worranit	Actress, Singer	Eliminated

=== Group 3 ===
Order	Episode	Stage Name	Song	Identity	Profession	Result
1	EP.9	Rolled Squid	ฉันกำลังเป็นตัวแทนของใครหรือเปล่า	Tao Pusin	Singer, Actor	Eliminated
1	EP.9	Bingo	เรี่ยมเร้เรไร	Undisclosed		Advanced to Final
1	EP.9	Bumper Car	ซากอ้อย	Am Chutima	Singer, Songwriter	Eliminated
1	EP.9	Floating Balloon	น้ำลาย	Undisclosed		Advanced to Final

== Final ==
Group	Episode	Stage Name	Song	Identity	Profession	Result
1	EP.10	Carousel	ฉันไม่ใช่นางเอก	Frame Supakchaya	Singer, Rapper	Eliminated
1	EP.10	Balloon Darts	ไม่อาจเปลี่ยนใจ	Undisclosed		Advanced to Champ VS Champ
1	EP.10	Duet: ลูกทุ่งลิซึ่ม				
2	EP.11	Fireworks	แก้มน้องนางนั้นแดงกว่าใคร + สั่งนาง	Third Lapat	Singer, Actor	Eliminated
2	EP.11	Snake Wife	เปราะบาง	Undisclosed		Advanced to Champ VS Champ
2	EP.11	Duet: เรามา Sing				
3	EP.12	Bingo	ถ้าฉันเป็นเขา	Tum Warawut	Singer, Actor	Eliminated
3	EP.12	Floating Balloon	คิดถึง + นาฬิกาตาย	Undisclosed		Advanced to Champ VS Champ
3	EP.12	Duet: ณ บัด NOW				

== Champ VS Champ ==
Episode	Stage Name	Song	Identity	Profession	Result
EP.13	Balloon Darts	ทะเลใจ	Undisclosed		Advanced to Champ of the Champ
EP.13	Snake Wife	คิดถึง + แค่ได้คิดถึง + คิดถึง	Undisclosed		Advanced to Champ of the Champ
EP.13	Floating Balloon	พี่สาวครับ + เด็กกว่าแล้วไง	James Teeradon	Singer, Actor	Eliminated
EP.13	Special Show: เจริญ เจริญ				

== Champ of the Champ ==
Episode	Stage Name	Song	Identity	Profession	Result
EP.14	Balloon Darts	กำนันทองหล่อ + WIP WUP วิบวับ (Explicit)	Dew Arunpong	Singer, Actor, MC	Runner-up
EP.14	Snake Wife	Live & Learn	Dome Jaruwat	Singer, Actor	Champion
EP.14	Duet: หยุดฝันก็ไปไม่ถึง				

== Celebration of The Mask Champion ==
Episode	Song	Stage Name
EP.15	ซุปเปอร์วาเลนไทน์	Snake Wife, Holvichai and Kavee
EP.15	บอลลูน + หญิงลั้ลลา + Play Girl + เพ้อเจ้อ	Bingo, Balloon Darts, Bumper Car, Carousel
EP.15	Hidden Track + ที่ปรึกษา + ระหว่างที่รอเขา	Holvichai and Kavee, Floating Balloon, Fireworks and Snake Wife
EP.15	แค่ที่รัก (My Boo)	Bingo, Balloon Darts, Carousel, Bumper Car, Floating Balloon, Fireworks
EP.15	ไม่ต้องมีคำบรรยาย	All masked singers

== Elimination table ==
Contestant	Identity	Ep.1	Ep.2	Ep.3	Ep.4	Ep.5	Ep.6	Ep.7	Ep.8	Ep.9	Ep.10	Ep.11	Ep.12	Ep.13	Ep.14
Snake Wife	Dome Jaruwat	—	—	—	SAFE	—	—	—	SAFE	—	—	WIN	—	SAFE	Winner
Balloon Darts	Dew Arunpong	SAFE	—	—	—	—	—	SAFE	—	—	WIN	—	—	SAFE	Runner-up
Floating Balloon	James Teeradon	—	—	—	—	SAFE	—	—	—	SAFE	—	—	WIN	OUT	
Bingo	Tum Warawut	—	—	—	—	SAFE	—	—	—	SAFE	—	—	OUT		
Fireworks	Third Lapat	—	—	SAFE	—	—	—	—	SAFE	—	—	OUT			
Carousel	Frame Supakchaya	SAFE	—	—	—	—	—	SAFE	—	—	OUT				
Rolled Squid	Tao Pusin	—	—	—	—	—	SAFE	—	—	OUT					
Bumper Car	Am Chutima	—	—	—	—	—	SAFE	—	—	OUT					
Ice Pop	Mook Worranit	—	—	SAFE	—	—	—	—	OUT						
String Lights	Patcha Anek-ayuwat	—	—	—	SAFE	—	—	—	OUT						
Dunk Tank	Grace Karnklao	—	SAFE	—	—	—	—	OUT							
Poor Man's Pancake	Nittaya Bunsungnoen	—	SAFE	—	—	—	—	OUT							
Grilled Meatballs	Thanom Sarm Tone	—	—	—	—	—	OUT								
Lucky Draw	Fahsai Paweensuda	—	—	—	—	OUT									
Ferris Wheel	Nhong ChaChaCha	—	—	—	OUT										
Wall of Death	Jeep Vasu	—	—	OUT											
Cotton Candy	Pa Ted Yutthana	—	OUT												
Haunted House	Cham Chamrum	OUT													

This contestant won the battle and moved on to the next round.
This contestant is safe from elimination.
This contestant is eliminated.
