= Waiphot Phetsuphan =

Thai luk thung singer (1942–2022)

- ไวพจน์ เพชรสุพรรณ
- Born: Phan Sakulnee; 7 March 1942; Bang Pla Ma, Suphan Buri, Thailand
- Died: 12 January 2022 (aged 79); Bangkok, Thailand
- Occupations: Singer-songwriter; producer
- Awards: 1997 National Artist
- Musical career
- Genres: Luk Thung
- Years active: 1962–2022
- Labels: Wiphot Phetsuphan Band; Four-S; GMM Grammy

Phan Sakulnee (Thai: พาน สกุลนี; 7 March 1942 – 12 January 2022), best known by the stage name Waiphot Phetsuphan (Thai: ไวพจน์ เพชรสุพรรณ), was a Thai luk thung and Phleng Lae (Thai: เพลงแหล่) singer and National Artist of Thailand in 1997. He is associated with "Queen of Luk thung", Pumpuang Duangjan, for whom he has written songs to Pumpuang including "Keaw Roe Phee" (แก้วรอพี่) and "Countryside Singer" (นักร้องบ้านนอก/Nak Rong Baan Nork).

== Life and career ==
Phetsuphan was born in Suphan Buri Province on 7 March 1942. He was of Laotian descent. He became a singer in 1962. His popular songs include "Taeng Thao Tai" (แตงเถาตาย), "Fang Khao Thit Kaeo" (ฟังข่าวทิดแก้ว), and "Baeng Sombat" (แบ่งสมบัติ), etc. He died in Bangkok on 12 January 2022, at the age of 79.

== Partial Discography ==
- "Taeng Thao Tai" (แตงเถาตาย)
- "Fang Khao Thit Kaeo" (ฟังข่าวทิดแก้ว)
- "Baeng Sombat" (แบ่งสมบัติ)
- แหล่ประวัติพุ่มพวง (1992)
- ท็อปฮิต อมตะเสียงสวรรค: หัวอกโชเฟอร์ (1993)
- ลูกทุ่งเบรคแตก (1995)
- "Nak Sang Seeka" (นาคสั่งสีกา) (with Tossapol Himmapan) (2000)
