= Tossapol Himmapan =

Tossapol Himmapan ทศพล หิมพานต์
- Born: Somboon Choonmusik; 15 April 1965 (age 60); Uthai Thani Province, Thailand
- Genres: Luk thung
- Occupation: Singer
- Instrument: Vocal
- Years active: 1995–present
- Labels: Four-S

Tossapol Himmapan (Thai: ทศพล หิมพานต์; RTGS: Thotsaphon Himmaphan; born 15 April 1965) is a Thai Luk thung singer from the record label Four-S. He is one of the most popular and prolific artists in the Phleng Lae (เพลงแหล่) genre. His popular song, Ah Lai Mary (อาลัยเมรี), was released in 1995. He has performed with Waiphot Phetsuphan and Yui Yatyer.

== Early life and career ==
Tossapol Himmapan was born on 15 April 1965 in Uthai Thani Province with the birth name Somboon Choonmusik. After completing Grade 4, he dropped out of school to work on his family rice fields for a year before being ordained as a novice monk. After moving to a temple in Nakhon Sawan Province, he practiced singing Phleng Lae with Luang Por Luea, graduated in Buddhist theology and was ordained a monk for one year. He was later conscripted into the Thai military, where he served for two years.

Himmapan began his career on stage at the suggestion of Wanchana Kieddee. His first album was Ah Lai Mary. He is a singer with record label, Four-S.

He has five wives and eight children.

== Partial discography ==
- 1995 – Ah Lai Mary (อาลัยเมรี)
- 2000 – Nak Sang Seeka (นาคสั่งสีกา) (with Waiphot Phetsuphan)
- Lae Si Kasat Dien Dong (แหล่สี่กษัตริย์เดินดง)

== Filmography ==
- 1999 – Phor (TV series)
- 2003 – Mon Phleng Luk Thung FM
- 2013 – Ruam Phon Khon Luk Thung Nguen Lan
- 2019 - Jan Kra Jang Tee Klang Tung (TV series)
