= Aphaphorn Nakhonsawan =

Thai singer (born 1968)

Aphaphorn Nakhonsawan อาภาพร นครสวรรค์
- Born: Janphen Khongprakob (Thai: จันทร์เพ็ญ คงประกอบ); 29 July 1968 (age 57); Nakhon Sawan Province, Thailand
- Genres: Luk thung · pop · dance
- Occupation: Singer
- Instrument: Vocal
- Years active: 1986–present

Aphaphorn Nakhonsawan is a Thai luk thung and pop dance singer. Her popular song include Loek Laew Ka, Chob Mai, Nong Non Mai Lab, etc. She is popular in Thai LGBTQ+ community, as well as Katreeya Marasri and Pumpuang Duangjan.

She was born with a birth name Janphen Khongprakob in 1968 in Nakhon Sawan Province. In 1986 she started on stage by join to a member of Pumpuang Duangjan's band as a dancer. In 1991, she registed to artist from Boxing Sound. Her first two albums is remedy song with Yingyong Yodbuangarm, and she was popular in 1996 by her single Loek Laew Ka. In 2024, she collaborated with Milli in a single Hey! Hey!.

She finished educated from Bangkokthonburi University (BA + master).
