= Orawee Sujjanon =

Thai lukgrung singer (born 1965)

- Born: Waraporn Sappakijjanon; March 9, 1965 (age 60); Bangkok, Thailand
- Occupation: Singer

Orawee Sujjanon (Thai: อรวี สัจจานนท์, sometimes Sutjahnon, Satchanont, or Sajjanont; RTGS: Orawi Satchanon) (born 9 March 1965) is a Thai lukgrung singer who has the alias "the singer with voice like a bell" (thai:นักร้องเสียงระฆังเเก้ว). Her nickname is Lek (Thai :เล็ก). Popularly known as Lek Orawee, she was born in Phrasamutchedi District, Samutprakan Province, Thailand. Her family are of Thai-Chinese nationality and her home is in Phasamutjade, Samutprakan. She graduated from Pranakorn Rajabhat University.

== History ==
She started singing at the Prasamutjadee festival with the songs of Pongsri Woranut such as Ginkhangandnompric, Oonjan and Saligakuentin. While she was studying grade 7, she came second in a singing contest with the Traweancaydan song by Jintana Suksathit. It was this contest that inspired her to be a singer.

When she studied grade 10 at Horwang School, she had the occasion to sing at Happy Land amusement park where she received an award in 1980. And there was an award about her singing as the best singer of Thailand in 1982.

In the past, the condition of the singing contest was limited by age but she decided to compete. The singing contest had many challengers, and it that made the contest higher rating of competition. Finally, she got the reward from this contest by herself, she was a singer.

When she was a singer, she worked together with famous artists and singers such as Reward, Yuemai, Tanis Sriglindee and Surachai Junthimatorn until she was herself famous.

She has more than 100 songs from 1988 to 2014.

== Achievements ==
She is an accomplished songwriter who has more than one hundred songs. Her albums have earned over 10 million bhat. Some of her most famous albums are Sanam Arom, Measai and Suangean.

Year	Albums	Artist be joined	Group
1988-1990	Yuaemai Albums 1-13	Wira Bamrungsri	Keta Record
1991	Oraweegabkhwamrak Sainam Sengsaaun		GMM
1992	Thale-Arom		
1995	Dokmai-Pliansee		
1996	Phetnammung Album 1-6		
1997	Knakhuanmuang		
	Thabthim-Sayam Album 1-3		
	DaoRoiduan 3		
1998	LomPhai Album 1-3		
1999	Khakhuanmuang Album 4-6		
	Grammy Gold Series Suntraphorn	Nanthida Keawbuasai, Saranya Songsreamsawad, Panadda Ruendwud, Utean Prommin, Phuvanad Phuplin, Sumet Ong-Aad	Grammy Gold
2000	Kaimuk Burapha Album 1-2		
2001	Kaimuk Burapha Album 3		
	Krunaiduangjai	Mice Phiromporn	
2002	Khanmueng Album 1-2		
	Chunjai		
	The Best Selected Album 1-3		
2003	LamnamhangsailomAlbum 1-2		
2004	Pragaykeaw Album 1-4		
	Khukhiang Samniagrak Album1-2	Charin Nanthanakorn	
2005	Rakthikidthung Album 1-8		
	10 Years Grammy Gold		
2006	Rakthikidthung Album 1		
	Khonthichai Album 1		
2007	Dokmai Jak Sid		
	12 years Grammy Gold		
2009	Bodplengheangrak		
2012	Aanphenduangjai Album 1-2		

== Concert ==
Her concert was arranged with embellishment in 2007, and her concert name is “The sweet song in downtown Concert” (Thai: เพลงหวานกลางกรุง). This concert had more than 30 songs in 3 hours and she was joined by special artists such as Sombat Metanee, Wongjun Prirote and Odd Kiriboon.

== Awards ==
- Best Singer from Mizzubishi? (1981)
- Best Singer from Thailand singing contest (1983)
- Best Singer from Gold Award (1992)
- Immortal woman of singer (1997, 1998)
- Malaithong award from remake of old songs (2005)
