= Poyfai Malaiporn =

Poyfai Malaiporn ปอยฝ้าย มาลัยพร
- Born: Duangjan Malai; 14 January 1971 (age 55); Nong Khai Province, Thailand
- Genres: Luk thung Mor lam
- Occupations: Singer; Actor
- Instrument: Vocal
- Years active: 1994–present
- Label: Topline Diamond

Poyfai Malaiporn (also spelled Poifai and Poifhai, Thai: ปอยฝ้าย มาลัยพร, RTGS: Poifai Malaiphon, born 14 January 1971 in Fao Rai District, Nong Khai Province, Thailand) is a Thai luk thung and mor lam singer.

== Early life ==
He was born in Nong Khai Province. His birth name is "Duangjan Malai", but he uses "Poyfai" as his stage name.

== Career ==
He started performing on stage in 1994, as a member of mor lam band "Sieng Isan", presented by Noknoi Uraiporn. After being a member of Sieng Isan for 2–3 years, he became a solo artist. He was associated with Topline Diamond, a famous record label in Thailand, has many popular songs including Mun Tong Thon, Katoey Pra Tuang, Talok Oak Hak, etc.

He was a hard liquor consumer since he was 18 years old and couldn't work for entertainers full-time. He quit drinking in 2017 with help and encouragement from his wife.

== Discography ==
=== Album ===
- "Poyfai Won Faen" ปอยฝ้ายวอนแฟน
- "Talok Oak Hak" ตลกอกหัก
- 2002 - "Mue Sor Khon Sao" มือซอคนเศร้า
- 2003 - "Nam Ta Kha Rock" น้ำตาขาร็อค
- 2004 - "Won Faa" วอนฟ้า
- 2005 - "Fak Faa Pai Ha Nong" ฝากฟ้าไปผ่าน้อง
- 2006 - "Khao La Ma Raeng" ข่าวล่ามาแรง
- 2007 - "Chatukham Khon Jon" จตุคามคนจน
- 2008 - "Mun Tong Thon" มันต้องถอน
- 2009 - "Mak Laew Krab" มักแล้วครับ
- 2010 - "Mai Dai Aem Chan Roak" ไม่ได้แอ้มฉันหรอก
- 2011 - "Hai Ai Hak Jao Sa Nor" ให้อ้ายฮักเจ้าสาเนาะ
- 2012 - "Ngan Khao" งานเข้า

=== Single ===
- 2015 - "Wa Si Sao Lao" ว่าสิเซาเหล้า
- 2015 - "Hai Yae Nae La" ให้แหย่แหน่หล่า
- 2017 - "Phee Nga Kham" ผีง่าขาม
- 2018 - "Ploy Pua" ปล่อยผัว
- 2018 - "Sanya Jai Num Thai Sao Lao" สัญญาใจหนุ่มไทยสาวลาว

== Filmography ==
=== TV Drama ===
- 2017 - "Nay Hoi Tha Min"
- 2018 - "Nai Kuen Nao Saeng Dao Yang Oun"
- 2019 - "Phoo Bao Indy Yayee Inter"

== Awards ==
- 2008 Star Entertainment Awards - Most popular luk thung song: "Mun Tong Thon"
- 7th Golden Ganesha Awards - Most popular male song: "Mun Tong Thon"
- 6th Maha Nakhon Awards - Most popular male Luk thung singer, and Most popular luk thung song: "Mun Tong Thon"
