= Sprite (rapper) =

Thai rapper (born 2005)

Sprite สไปร์ท
- Born: Sukalawat Phuangsombat; 30 October 2005 (age 20); Chachoengsao, Thailand
- Genres: Hip-hop
- Occupation: Singer
- Instruments: Vocal; autotune
- Years active: 2020–present

Sukalawat Phuangsombat (Thai: ศุกลวัฒน์ พวงสมบัติ; born 30 October 2005), nicknamed Sprite (Thai: สไปร์ท), is a Thai rapper.

== History ==
Sukalawat Phuangsombat was born on 30 October 2004 at Chachoengsao as an older child of a family of 2 children. His family was moderately wealthy. His father worked in a company while his mother worked at a hospital. He and his family often spends their weekends earning money to support the family, often selling things at flea markets and festivals. Sukollawat is patient in earning money and is determined to study. Sukollawat began his secondary education at Phra Phimon Seni School (Prom Hongsakul).

Sukalawat became famous after he joined the Super Ten Season 2 competition in singing Lukthung songs, which he had practiced, until he became a topic of discussion in online society.

Sukalawat's song with GUYGEEGEE "Thon (ทน)" has generated over 400 million views.

== Discography ==
=== EPs ===
- My Type (2024)

=== Digital singles ===
- "ไอ้ต้าว" (2020)
- "ดาวดึงส์" (2021)
- "บังอร" (2021)
- "ย้าย" (2021)
- "Kiminoto" (2022)
- "ไอ้หนุ่ย" (2022)
- "BTS" (2022)
- "Rak Krai Mai Pen" (2022)
- "สาวเมืองน่าน" (2023)
- "Deity" (2023)
- "Bad" (2023)
- "Jiggo" (2023)
- "คนละมอง" (2023)
- "สองล้อไม่ง้อสองรัก" (2024)

=== Special singles ===
- "เพชรเม็ดโต" (2020)
- "ปิก้า ปิก้า" (2020)
- "เดียวดาย" (2020)
- "Uzi" (2020)
- "สตาร์ตดียกแก๊ง" (2021)

=== Collaborations ===
- "ตะขาบ" (with Various artists) (2020)
- "Trap in the Jungle" (with GUYGEEGEE) (2020)
- "Trust Again" (with Matthaios, Raisa, & YonnyBoii) (2021)
- "อิตา อิตา" (with OG BOBBY & DON KIDS) (2021)
- "ทน" (with GUYGEEGEE) (2021)
- "7777777" (with Various artists) (2021)
- "ปิ้ว ปิ้ว" (with GUYGEEGEE) (2021)
- "ทน (Songkran Remix)" (with GUYGEEGEE) (2022)
- "ปิ้ว ปิ้ว (Songkran Remix)" (with GUYGEEGEE) (2022)
- "XOXO" (with Repezen Foxx) (2022)
- "HYPE TRAIN Cypher - All HYPE TRAIN Artists" (with Various artists) (2023)
