= Ble Patumrach =

Ble Patumrach เบิ้ล ปทุมราช
- Born: Artit Somnoei (Thai: อาทิตย์ สมน้อย); 30 June 1996 (age 30); Amnat Charoen Province, Thailand
- Genres: Mor lam; Luk thung
- Occupations: Singer; songwriter; net idol
- Instruments: Vocals; guitar
- Years active: 2015–present
- Label: R-Siam

Artit Somnoei (Thai: อาทิตย์ สมน้อย), also known by the stage name Ble Patumrach (Thai: เบิ้ล ปทุมราช), is a Thai Luk thung singer and songwriter.

== Biography ==
His nickname is Ble (Thai: เบิ้ล). He was born on 30 June 1996 at Amnat Charoen Province. He is on stage for Thai music from 2015 to the present.

He graduated at Prathumrach Wongsa School, Secondary 6 in 2014.

== Discography ==
=== Single Discography ===
- I have my reason (อ้ายมีเหตุผล)
- Father's words. (คำสอนของพ่อ)
- Nether on Facebook nor Line. (เฟซก็หายไลน์ก็เงียบ)
- Babe, I wanna make up with you. (คนดีพี่มาง้อ) (Featuring Tanya R-Siam)
- Online Love (สื่อรักออนไลน์)
- The last hug (กอดครั้งสุดท้าย) (Featuring Tanya R-Siam)
- Let you go (ให้น้องไปสา)
- My life for you (Ost.Sankatmochan Mahabali Hanuman) (ลมหายใจพลีให้เธอ)
- The two greatest things in my life (Ost.Chaloei Suek) (สองสิ่งที่ยิ่งใหญ่)
- I did all I could (อ้ายเฮ็ดทุกวิถีทาง)(Featuring Kong Huayrai)

== Dramas ==
- 2022 Krasue Lam Sing (กระสือลำซิ่ง) (Cheer Up/Ch.8) as Ble Patumrach R-Siam
- 2023 Phleng Rak Roi Khaen (เพลงรักรอยแค้น) (Montage Entertainment/Ch.8) as Pakorn Preedakul (Korn) (ปกรณ์ ปรีดากุล (กรณ์)) with Kittiya Jitpakdee

== MC ==
Online

- 2022 : น่ารักสัตว์สัตว์ EP.1 On Air YouTube:เบิ้ล ปทุมราช
