= Yingyong Yodbuangarm =

Thai luk thung singer

Yingyong Yodbuangarm ยิ่งยง ยอดบัวงาม
- Born: Prayong Buangam; 25 December 1962 (age 62); Sisaket Province, Thailand
- Genres: Luk thung
- Occupations: Singer; actor; songwriter; MC; YouTuber
- Instrument: Vocal
- Years active: 1992–present
- Labels: Anothai Promotion; Topline Diamond

Yingyong Yodbuangarm (Thai: ยิ่งยง ยอดบัวงาม, RTGS: Yingyong Yotbuangam) born 25 December 1962, in Khukhan District, Sisaket Province, Thailand) is a famous Thai Luk thung singer. He was popularized by the song "Somsri 1992".

== Early life ==
His birth name is Prayong Buangam and he was born on 25 December 1962, in Khukhan District, Sisaket Province. He is the son of Ploy and Nai Buangam. Since his family was very poor during his young life, he had to work while attending primary classes to help his parents out. After finishing primary 6, he became a monk.

Next, from pay of temple he became a monk, he was educated until he finished education in secondary 3 from Ku Khan Rat Banrung School. He then left the Buddhist monkhood and went to work in Bangkok where he met with Pamon Anothai, a famous songwriter.

He graduated from University at Dhonburi.

=== Career and first popularlity ===
He went to help Pamon in a Radio Station job of Territorial Defense Command. After working for 2 years, Pamon took songs to him to record including "Ai Num Lieang Kwai" and "Rak Rak Rak". After the recording, Pamon decided a stage name for him, Yingyong Yodbuangarm. When his songs started to be popular, Wanchana Kieddee asked him to sing in a café act as Wanchana so busy.

Next, Sakhon Atanawichai listened to his song, liked his sound, and recorded a studio album, "Ai Num Lieng Kwai", together with established Luk thung band for him. After that, he recorded and released many studio albums including "Wi Man Rak", "Ai Num Chao Ruea". In 1992, with his studio album, "Ying Yong Ma Laew", he had the most famous and popular song of his life, "Som Sri 1992" (Thai: สมศรี 1992), lyrics by Wut Warakan and composed by Kittisak Sainamthip. Then Wut took the song title "Som Sri 1992" in side B of compact cassette, because he did not know that in future this song would be so popular.

At present he is a singer for record label Topline Diamond.

== Family life ==
He was married to Yodsana Phumarae; they have two children. He then married Monthathip Buangam and had a daughter, YoYo Simonmart.

== Discography ==
=== Studio album ===
- 1986 : Ai Num Lieng Kway (ไอ้หนุ่มเลี้ยงควาย)
- 1992-1999 : Ying Yong Mar Laew Vol.1 - 10 (ยิ่งยงมาแล้วชุดที่ 1-10)
  - Vol.1 : Somsri 1992 (สมศรี 1992) (1992) [Label : Boxing Sound]
  - Vol.3 : Taxi Gub Nang Lom (แท็กซี่กับนางโลม) (1993) [Label : Boxing Sound]
  - Vol.4 : Chang Thong Rong Hai (ช่างทองร้องไห้) (1994) [Label : Boxing Sound]
  - Vol.5 : Kammakorn Kor Sang (กรรมกรก่อสร้าง) (1995) [Label : Boxing Sound, Anothai Promotion]
  - Vol.8 : Num Surin Rak Sao Surat (หนุ่มสุรินทร์รักสาวสุราษฎร์) (1998) [Label : PGM]
- 2003 : Kin Yar Phid Song (กินยาผิดซอง) [Label : Topline Diamond]
- 2005 : Phom Took Prak Prum (ผมถูกปรักปรำ) [Label : Topline Diamond]
- 2012 : No Kantrum (โนกันตรึม) [Label : Topline Diamond]

=== Single ===
- 2022 : Aeb Mia Song LINE (แอบเมียส่งไลน์))

=== Partial discography ===
- Som Sri 1992 (สมศรี 1992)
- Ying Yong Ma Laew (ยิ่งยงมาแล้ว)
- Ai Num Lieng Kwai (ไอ้หนุ่มเลี้ยงควาย)
- Chang Thong Rong Hai (ช่างทองร้องไห้)
- Taxi Gub Nang Lom (แท็กซี่กับนางโลม)
- Fao Rak Fao Khoi (เฝ้ารักเฝ้าคอย)
- Aok Hak Pro Rak Miea (อกหักเพราะรักเมีย)
- Pood Hai Roo Rueng Bang (พูดให้รู้เรื่องบ้าง)
- Num Surin Rak Sao Surat (หนุ่มสุรินทร์รักสาวสุราษฎร์)
- Pom Took Prak Pram (ผมถูกปรักปรำ)
- Kin Ya Pid Song (กินยาผิดซอง)
- Khoe Nguen Miea Pai Sia Kha Hong (ขอเงินเมียไปเสียค่าห้อง)
- Kan Truem Ska (กันตรึมสกา)
- Koei Nong Yeam Thee Bor Kor Sor (คอยน้องแย้มที่ บ.ข.ส)

== MC ==
Online

- 2018 : – On Air YouTube:Yingyong 24
