= Ja Nongpanee =

Thai singer and model

Nongpanee Mahadthai นงผณี มหาดไทย
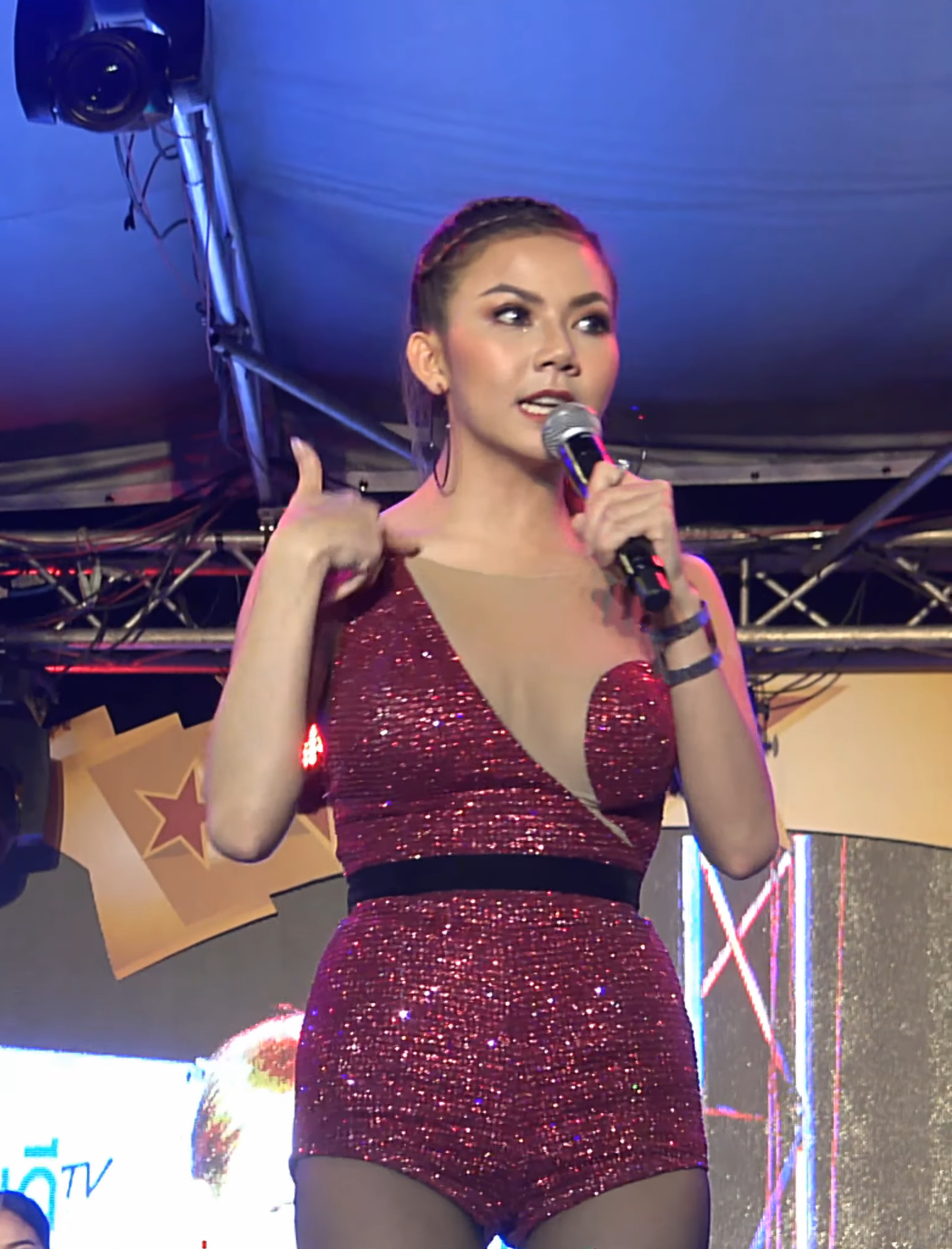
- Born: Nongpanee Mahadthai; May 6, 1991 (age 34); Ang Thong, Thailand
- Occupations: Singer; model; businesswoman; television personality; MC; YouTuber
- Years active: 2011–present
- Musical career
- Genres: Thai-pop; Luk thung; dance
- Labels: R-Siam

Nongpanee Mahadthai (born May 6, 1991) (Thai: นงผณี มหาดไทย), performing under the stage name Ja R-Siam (Thai: จ๊ะ อาร์ สยาม), is a Thai singer and model. Ja graduated from Rajamangala University of Suvarnabhumi.

== Career ==
Ja is well known for her 2011 single cover, "Kan Hoo", the singer became a subject of heated debate in previous years over her lewd dance moves and risque puns.

Though most of her success as a recording artist has been in Asia, Ja has also gained popularity in Western countries, due in part to internet videos which have gone viral. Media outlets have referred to Ja as "Star of the Sexually Explicit".

In 2013 she joined the label Rsiam.

== Discography ==
=== Noo Chob Rad ===
The debut album, หนูชอบแรด was released on May 15, 2012.

The album contains twelve songs :-

1. "Kan Hoo" (คันหู)
2. "Karng kuen mai wa" (ค้างคืนไม่ว่า)
3. "Kao wat thur loong" (เข้าวัดเถอะลุง)
4. "Noo chop rad" (หนูชอบแรด)
5. "Aok huk rueng lek" (อกหักเรื่องเล็ก)
6. "Yaa aow hoo nhee" (อย่าเอาหูหนี)
7. "Noo mai yorm" (หนูไม่ยอม)
8. "Wan rak jer leuy" (วันแรกเจอเลย)
9. "Aoy jeb" (โอ๊ยเจ็บ)
10. "Chop kon mee tung" (ชอบคนมีตังค์)
11. "Tai yark" (ตายยาก)
12. "Lerk laew ka" (เลิกแล้วค่ะ)

=== Noo Aow Yoo ===
The next album, หนูเอาอยู่ was released on July 26, 2012.

The album contains twelve songs :-

1. "Noo aow yoo" (หนูเอาอยู่)
2. "Kun hoo" (คันหู)
3. "Strawber lhae" (สตอเบอแหล)
4. "Yark mee fan pen khong tua eang" (อยากมีแฟนเป็นของตัวเอง)
5. "Kao pid tee" (เกาผิดที่)
6. "Tar yark noo yer" (ท่ายากหนูเยอะ)
7. "Kwai tuen" (ควายตื่น)
8. "Yark mee kon aow jai" (อยากมีคนเอา...ใจ)
9. "Yaa aow hu nhee" (อย่าเอาหูหนี)
10. "Mod pro" (หมดโปร)
11. "Ngeab" (เงียบ)
12. "Wan tee mee ror ruer" (วันที่มีรอเรือ)

== Singles ==
- "นิสัยฉันเปลี่ยนตามสันดานเธอ" (October 22, 2013)
- "เห็นนางเงียบๆ ฟาดเรียบนะคะ" (August 14, 2014)
- "เมียพี่มีชู้" feat. Baitoey Rsiam (October 31, 2014)
- "มีทองท่วมหัว ไม่มีผัวก็ได้" (Gold Or Hubby) (September 1, 2015)
- "แอ๊บตามกระแสแหลตามสไตล์" (July 29, 2016)
- "จีบหน่อย อร่อยแน่" (January 24, 2017)
- "สวยวนไปค่ะ" (March 23, 2017)
- "ดีออก" (April 19, 2018)
- "ไม่แรดอยู่ยาก" (January 31, 2019)
- "ด.จ.ป." feat. บริษัทฮาไม่จำกัด (June 8, 2019)

== Concert Live ==
In Thailand

- 2012: หนูเอาอยู่ (Noo Aow Yoo)
- 2012: จ๊ะ คันหู ปะทะ เดียร์ นริศรา (Ja Kunhoo Vs. Dear Narisara) '
- 2014: เสมอหู..60 เต้าเขย่าเวที ชุด 1 (Samuer Hoo – Vol.1)
- 2014: เสมอหู..60 เต้าเขย่าเวที ชุด 2 (Samuer Hoo – Vol.2)
- 2015: เสมอหู..60 เต้าเขย่าเวที ชุด 3 (Samuer Hoo – Vol.3)
- 2015: เสมอหู..60 เต้าเขย่าเวที ชุด 4 (Samuer Hoo – Vol.4)

=== Master of Ceremony: MC ===
Year	Thai title	Title	Network	Notes	With
2020–present			YouTuber:อีจ๊ะ Channel		
