= Rung Suriya =

Thai actor and Luk thung singer

- รุ่ง สุริยา
- Born: Narong Saewee (Thai: ณรงค์ แซ่วี); 14 July 1969 (age 56); Phitsanulok Province, Thailand
- Occupation: Singer
- Musical career
- Genres: Luk thung
- Years active: 1998–present
- Label: Topline Diamond • Rose Media Entertainment

Rung Suriya (Thai: รุ่ง สุริยา b. 14 July 1969) is a famous Thai Luk thung singer.

== Early life ==
He is a native of Narong Saewee (Thai: ณรงค์ แซ่วี), born in Bang Rakam District, Phitsanulok Province. He finished his education from Dhurakij Pundit University

== Career ==
He entered many singing contests and often won. He debuted on stage in 1998, and was famous for his popular song, "Rak Jing Hai Ting Nang" (Thai: รักจริงให้ติงนัง) composed by Jenpop Jobgrabuanwan. His other popular songs include "Won Pho Taksin" (Thai: วอนพ่อตากสิน), "Rak Nee Thee Seven" (Thai: รักหนีที่เซเว่น), "Nam Ta Lon Bon Mue Tue" (Thai: น้ำตาหล่นบนมือถือ), "Rak Ron Thee Don Jaedee" (Thai: รักรอนที่ดอนเจดีย์, etc.

His nickname is 'Gentleman of Luk thung (Thai: สุภาพบุรุษลูกทุ่ง).

== Discography ==
=== Albums ===
- Won Pho Tak Sin (วอนพ่อตากสิน) (1997)
- Ting Nang (ติงนัง) (1998)
- Rak Nee Thee Seven (รักหนีที่เซเว่น) (1999)
- Rak Khun Dot Com (รักคุณดอตคอม) (2001)
- Choi Long Cheng (ฉ่อยหลงเฉิง) (2002)
- Phleng Rak Mue Tue (เพลงรักมือถือ) (2002)
- Manee Mekala (มณีเมขลา) (2003)
- Nam Ta Lon Bon Mue Tue (น้ำตาหล่นบนมือถือ) (2004)
- Rak Ron Thee Don Jeadee (รักรอนที่ดอนเจดีย์) (2004)
- Rak Khon Naa Lieam (รักคนหน้าเหลี่ยม) (2006)
- Pra Jan Rong Hai (พระจันทร์ร้องไห้) (2008)
- Khwam Rak Diliver (ความรักเดลิเวอร์) (2010)

== TV Drama ==
- Sanae Luk Thung (เสน่ห์ลูกทุ่ง) (1998)
- Setthee Tien Plao (เศรษฐีตีนเปล่า) (2001)
- Hua Jai Klai Puen Tieng (หัวใจไกลปืนเที่ยง) (2002)
- Manee Mekala (มณีเมขลา) (2003)
- Lab Luang Lon (ลับลวงหลอน) (2013)
- Hang Krueang (หางเครื่อง) (2014)
- Mon Rak Phleng Phee Bok (มนต์รักเพลงผีบอก) (2015)
