= Suthirat Wongtewan =

Suthirat Wongtewan สุธิราช วงศ์เทวัญ
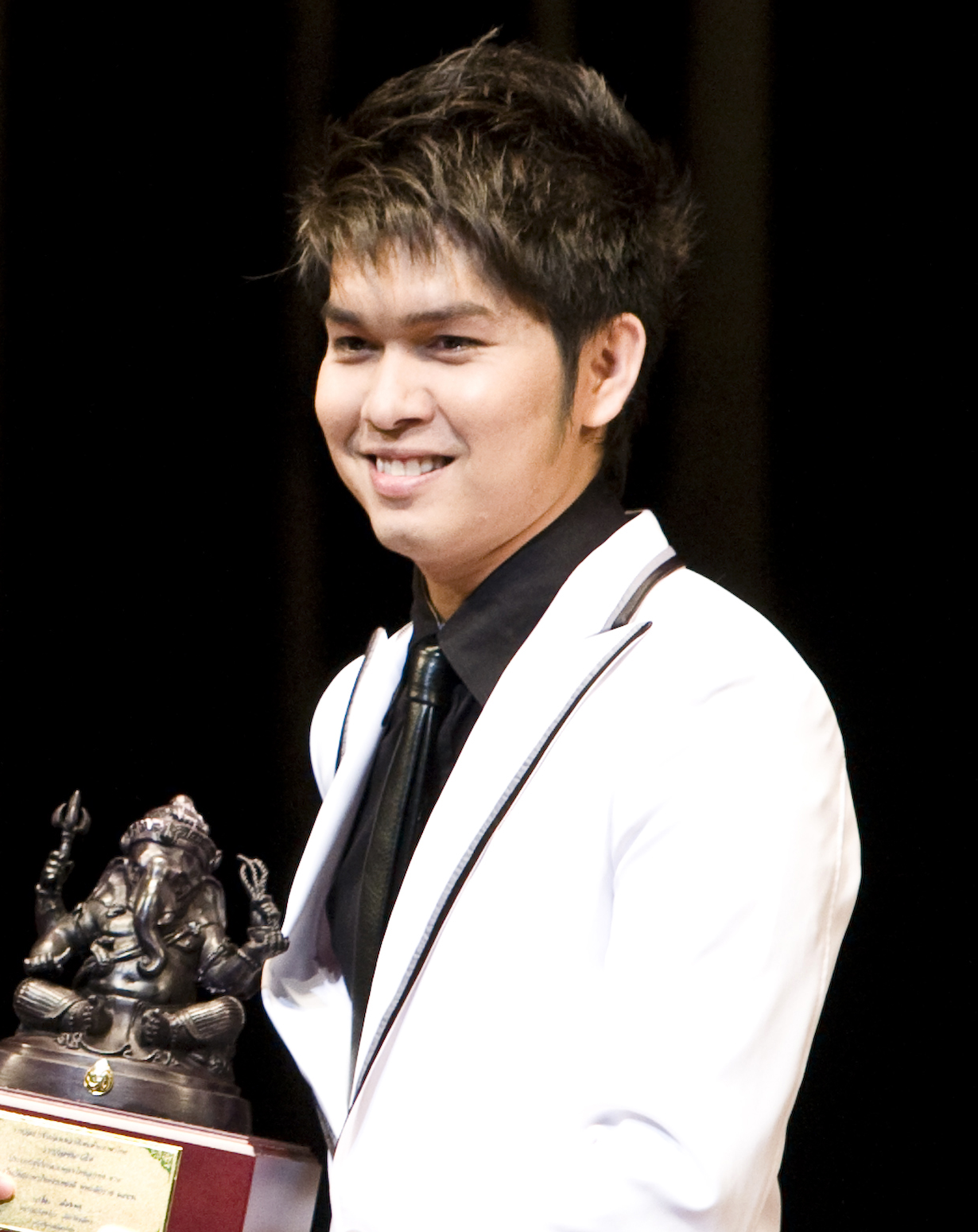
- Wongtewan in 2009

Background information
- Born: Suthirat Usupa; August 17, 1979 (age 46); Chai Nat Province, Thailand
- Genres: Luk thung
- Occupation: Singer
- Instrument: Vocal
- Years active: 1997–present
- Label: Krung Thai Musicaudio • R-Siam

Suthirat Wongtewan (Thai: สุธิราช วงศ์เทวัญ), nicknamed Kung (Thai: กุ้ง) (born 17 August 1979) is a famous Thai Likay actor, Luk thung singer and film actor. He has a popular song titled "Kor Pen Pra Ek Nai Hua Jai Ther" (ขอเป็นพระเอกในหัวใจเธอ), released in 1997.

== Early life and career ==
His birthname is Suthirat Usupha and he was born on 17 August 1979, in Chai Nat Province. He is the son of Chainarong and Taweeb Usupha. He had a job as Likay actor since he was young, and he was espak muzzle player of his birthplace. He finished his secondary class from Kuru Prachasan school, and Bachelor's degree from Ramkhamhaeng University, Faculty of Political Science.

He is the nephew of Jingreedkhaw Wongtewan, a famous Thai Luk thung singer, and has a younger sister named Wirada Wongtewan.

He started on stage in 1997 by persuasion of Pathin Khumprasert, and recorded his first album under the jurisdiction of record label Krung Thai Music Audio named Khor Pen Pra Ek Nai Hua Jai Ther (Thai: ขอเป็นพระเอกในหัวใจเธอ, in English named "Want to be the hero in your heart."), and became very popular. At present, he is an artist of R-Siam, and has many popular songs recorded by R-siam including, "Rieam Rae Rae Rai", "Tephee Ban Prai", etc.

== Discography ==
=== Studio albums ===
==== Krung Thai Music Audio ====
#	Album
1st	ขอเป็นพระเอกในหัวใจเธอ (Khor Pen Pra Ek Nai Hua Jai Ther): Released: 1997; Label: Krung Thai Music Audio

==== R-Siam ====
Album	Track listings
เรี่ยมเร้เรไร (Rieam Rea Rea Rai): Released: 2008; Label: R-Siam	Track listing: 1. Rieam Rea Rea Rai (เรี่ยมเร้เรไร ) 2. Khon Dee Kong Ther (คนดีของเธอ); 3. Hua Jai Rai Andap (หัวใจไร้อันดับ); 4. Yon (หย่อน); 5. Hero; 6. Kid Tueng Jai Ja Khad (คิดถึงใจจะขาด); 7. Ouch! Ouch! (โอ๊ยๆ); 8. Hak Hua Jai Mai Mee Ther (หากหัวใจไม่มีเธอ); 9. Suai Dai Jai (สวยได้ใจ); 10. Duai Raeng Haeng Rak (ด้วยแรงแห่งรัก)
หนึ่งในดวงใจ (Nueng Nai Duang Jai): Released: 2009; Label: R-Siam	Track listing: 1. Nueng Nai Duang Jai (หนึ่งในดวงใจ); 2. Ya Tue Khon Ba Ya Wa Khon Ngao (อย่าถือคนบ้า อย่าว่าคนเหงา); 3. Phoo Chai Hua Nao (ผู้ชายหัวเน่า); 4. The Phee Ban Prai (เทพีบ้านไพร); 5. Pha Fai Kab Sai Lom (ผ้าฝ้ายกับสายลม); 6. Sao Thai Wai Jab (สาวไทยวัยจ๊าบ); 7. Khon Thee Rak Ther Thee Sud (คนที่รักเธอที่สุด); 8. Long Rak (ลองรัก); 9. Khon Arai Mai Roo (คนอะไรไม่รู้); 10. Rok Ron Roan (โรคร้อนรน)

== Awards ==
- 2016 - Awards "Dao Mekhala"
