= Lamyai Haithongkham =

Thai mor lam sing singer

Lamyai Haithongkham ลำไย ไหทองคำ
- Born: Suphansa Vejkama; 2 October 1998 (age 27); Roi Et Province, Thailand
- Genres: Luk thung; mor lam sing; pop; rock
- Occupation: Singer
- Instrument: Vocal
- Years active: 2016–present
- Label: Haithongkham reccord

Lamyai Haithongkham (Thai: ลำไย ไหทองคำ) (born 2 October 1998), is a Thai mor lam sing singer from Isan area. She became popular in 2017 following the release of her single Phu Sao Khar Lor.

== Early life and musical career ==
Her birthname is Suphansa Vejkama, and she was born in Roi Et Province to a poor family. Her family moved to Bangkok when she was young.

She started on stage after she finished studies in Primary 4. She sang in the band Electone Keyboard until 2017, when Prajakchai Nawarat, who is the CEO in the Haithongkham record label, hired her. She became popular in this label and released her third single Phu Sao Khar Lor, with lyrics and melody by Arm Chutima. Phu Sao Khar Lor MV has gotten over 400 million views on YouTube (as of August, 2025).

Lamyai graduated bachelor's degree from The SCA Superstar Academy program by the SCA College of Music and Performing Arts (Superstar College of Arts)

In 2017, after criticism from Prime Minister Gen Prayut Prayut Chan-o-cha, her manager announced, "We will now reduce the signature twerking moves from nine to three." With her costume that looks like a lampshade, she has been criticized for the provocative style of it. In June 2020, the Prime Ministers of Thailand, Gen. Prayut Chan-o-cha asked about her costume. She quoted that it's just for show, and made with help from her family.

== Discography ==
=== Single ===
- น้ำตาท่วมกะละมัง (Nam tah thuam ka la mang)
- ดื่มเหล้ามันขมดื่มนมเถอะพี่ (Deum lao man khom Deum nom thoe phi)
- 17 สิเข้า (Sip jet Si khao)
- ผู้สาวขาเลาะ (Phu sao kha loh)
- ผู้สาวขาเฟี้ยว (Phu sao kha fiew)
- ส่งใจไปอัตตะปือ (Song jai pai Attapeu)
- น้องง่ายกับอ้ายผู้เดียว (Nong ngai kab ai phu diew)
- เด๋อเดี่ยงด่าง (Doe dieng dang)
- แซ่บอีหลี (Zab E-Lee) (with Mike Phiromphon, Khaothip Thidadin, Sax Chumphae and Lampholen Wongsakorn)

== Filmography ==
=== TV Drama ===
- 2020 - Sood Rak Zab E-Lee (network : One31)

=== Film ===
- 2022 - The Lake as Pam

== Awards ==
- 2017 - Maha Nakhon Awards 14th - new singer.
- 2018 - Siam Dara Star Awards - Best luk thung singer (woman).
