= Fon Tanasoontorn =

Thai Luk thung singer (born 1974)

- ฝน ธนสุนธร
- Born: Tueanjai Srisuntorn (Thai: เตือนใจ ศรีสุนทร); June 29, 1974 (age 52); Udon Thani Province, Thailand
- Occupation: Singer
- Musical career
- Genres: Luk thung; Pop; Country blues; Thai pop
- Years active: 1988–present
- Label: Sure Entertainment

Fon Tanasoontorn (Thai: ฝน ธนสุนธร) is a Thai Luk thung singer.

== Early life ==
She was born in Udon Thani Province, on June 29, 1974.

She attended a master at Pathum Thani University.

== Career ==
She started on stage in 1988, winning the beauty pageant Miss. Teen Olie. She then made commercials, starting with Olie Candy and appeared on the cover of Preaw magazine.

She was a singer for Kliver Entertainment, making the Country blues and pop studio album Mum Nueng Khong Huajai, released in 1995. Until 1997, she was a singer for record label Sure Entertainment. She adopted the Luk thung, Thai pop genre and later signed with Music D. Entertainment.

== Discography ==
- Hak Aai Jong Bong ฮักอ้ายโจงโปง (1998)
- Jai Oon ใจอ่อน (2000)
- Aeb Rak Khao แอบรักเขา ชุดพิเศษ (2001)
- Kho Chai Sit ขอใช้สิทธิ์ (2002)
- Phee Chai Chue Krao พี่ชายชั่วคราว (2003)
- Plae Pen Wan Valentine แผลเป็นวันวาเลนไทน์ (2004)
- Rak Mod Jai รักหมดใจ ชุดพิเศษ (2005)
- Dao Pradab Jai ดาวประดับใจ ชุดพิเศษ (2005)
- Koi Koi Ploi Mue ค่อยๆ ปล่อยมือ (2005)
- Fon Fak Rak ฝนฝากรัก (2006)
- Hua Jai Fak Tham หัวใจฝากถาม (2006)
- Tueng Vela Bok Rak ถึงเวลา...บอกรัก (2007)
- lieak Thee Rak Dai Mai เรียกที่รักได้มั้ย (2008)
- Pen Fan Kan Ma เป็นแฟนกันมะ (2008)
- Rak Nee Mai Mee Lueam รักนี้ไม่มีลืม (2009)
- Chan Ja Ngon Laew Na ฉันจะงอนแล้วนะ (2010)
- Kaew Ta Duang Jai แก้วตาดวงใจ (2011)
