= Chinawut Indracusin =

Thai singer, actor, model, and dancer (born 1989)

Chinawut Indracusin ชินวุฒ อินทรคูสิน
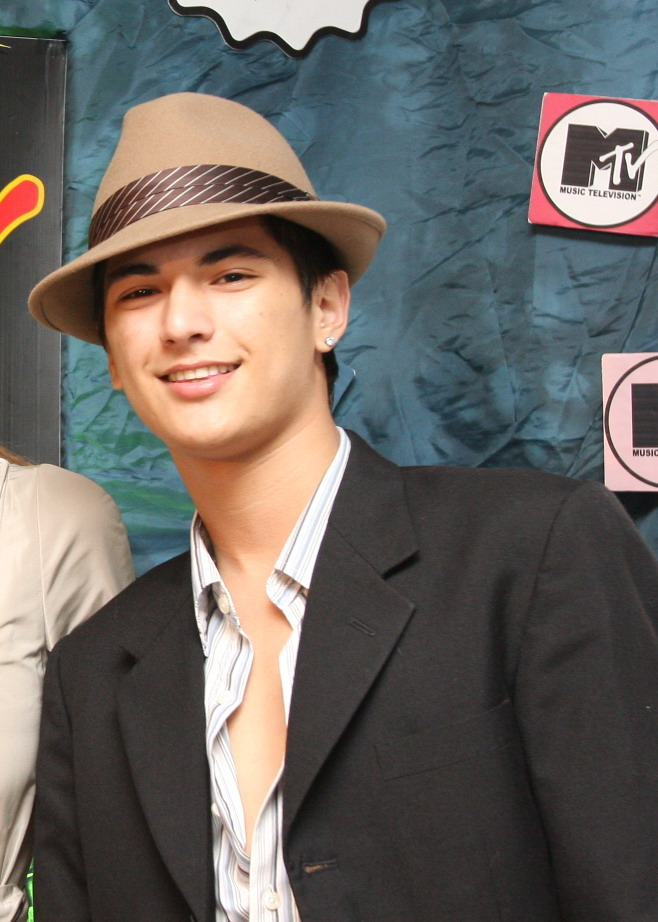
- Indracusin in 6th Years of MTV event

Background information
- Also known as: Chin
- Born: 13 August 1989 (age 37)
- Origin: Bangkok, Thailand
- Genres: Thai pop; R&B
- Occupations: Singer; actor; model; dancer; composer
- Years active: 2006–present
- Labels: GMM Grammy; GMM media DUCKBAR เดอะ วัน เอ็นเตอร์ไพรส์
- Military career
- Allegiance: Thailand
- Branch: Royal Thai Army
- Service years: 2016-2018
- Rank: Private
- Unit: Infantry Battalion,11th Military Circle.

Chinawut-Stéphane Indracusin (Thai: ชินวุฒ อินทรคูสิน; RTGS: Chinnawut Inthrakhusin), also known as Chin, is a Thai singer, actor, model, dancer, and music composer. He was the presenter for Sony Skinny T Digital Camera in Malaysia and a singer of growing reputation in Malaysia as well. Indracusin also starred in a Taiwanese drama Love 18 as Joshua. During 2016-2018, Indracusin served the Royal Thai Army as an Armed Forces member and the artist of the Royal Thai Army.

== Early life and education ==
Indracusin was born on 13 August 1989, in Bangkok to a Thai Chinese father and a French mother. He has one younger sister, Sophie Marguerite, who is an actress and dancer. He went to Bangkok Christian College and received a bachelor’s degree in Communication Arts in Broadcasting and Streaming Media Production from Sripatum University.

== Career ==
Indracusin signed with record label GMM Grammy's G-JUNIOR young artist development program. In 2003, Indracusin and two other musicians in G-JUNIOR, Rittidet Rittichu and Guy Ellis came together to form the group Big 3. After the release of their album We Are Big 3, the group disbanded. Indracusin and Ellis released a second album in 2006 with G-JUNIOR and 10th Club.

In May 2007, Indracusin released his own album, Chin Up. His first solo single that was released, "Pak Mai Trong Gub Jai" reached the Thai music charts. He later went to New York City to work on his next album Maybe I'm Bad. In the fall of 2008, Indracusin did a Malaysian commercial presenting a Sony Skinny T. For this commercial he recorded several of his songs in Chinese, including "Term Mai Koi Tem", "Roo Chai Mai Wa Ruk" and more recently "Koon Tee Neung".

In December 2008, he released his second single album Maybe I'm Bad featuring, "One Night Stand" or "Keun Tee Neung". Other well known songs from this new album include "Too Fast Too Serious" and "Hua jai mai chai gra-dard". He has three music videos from this album, one for "Keun Tee Neung" featuring himself, "Too Fast Too Serious" featuring himself and Thai singer Natasha Josephine Blake, and one for "Hua hai mai chai gra-dart" featuring himself, his sister Sophie, and Singaporean-Swedish model Ase Wang.

Indracusin has also starred in the original Taiwanese drama Love – 18 as Joshua and in 2016, he released his new single Jub – Yo x Gavin Duval.

== Filmography ==
=== Film ===
Year	Title	Role
2013	Long Weekend	Thongsook
2019	Curses	Freddy
2019	Pee Mak	Nont
2023	Tiger Running	Boss

=== Drama ===
Year	Title	Role
2009	Love 18	Joshua
2011	Lieutenant Opas	(Guest Role)
2012	Zeal 5 Kon Gla Tah Atam	(Guest Role)
2013	Keu Hat Ta Krong Pi Pop	Thun
2015	Roy Leh Sanae Rai	Tor
2017	Por Krua Hua Pa	Singer (Guest)
2017	Guiding Light	Pokpong
2018	Bangkok Ghost Stories: The Last Bus	Non
2018	Naet Nakin	Kingkawin
2018	Prom Mai Dai Likit	Puwadol
2019	Bangkok Love Stories: Objects of Affection	Bibo
2019	Secret Garden	Ray
2020	In Time With You	Mawin
2020	35 Dara Show	Meng
2021	The Mind Game	Lieutenant Pakin
2021	The Messenger	Earth
2021	Switch On	Pakorn
2022	Sisa Marn	Korn
2023	The Infinite Love	Karan Kornprasitsap
2023	Across the Sky	Night
2024	The Outing	Anan

== Songs as a group member ==
Indracusin appeared as a group member of these groups as following:

- We Are Big 3 (As Big 3), 2003
- Ten Club (As G – Jr), 2006

== Singles ==
- "Mai Mee Krai Bog Rak", 2008
- "Kon Ru Jai" (Ost. Series Love-18 Rak Woon Wai Hua Jai 18), 2009
- "Kon Tam Ma Da" (Ost. Drama Sood Sa Nae Ha), 2009
- "My Love My Code" (Ost. Commercial Ad: CAT 009), 2009
- "Kuen Nee Yak Dai Gee Krang", 2010
- "lan La Feat. Bank Opal", 2010
- "Hai Rak Dern Tang Ma Jer Gun" (Ost. Drama 4 Hua Jai Hang Kun Kao: Pa Ta Pee Leh Rak), 2010
- "Nai Wa Ja mai Look Gun Feat. Chantavit Dhanasevi" (Ost, Drama Muad Opas), 2011
- "My Bad Habit" (Ost. Commercial: Shampoo Pantene), 2012
- "Ter Ja You Nai Jai Kong Chan Sa Mer Feat. Cheranut Yusanonda" (Ost. Movie Long Weekend), 2013
- "Ya Bok Chan Wa Hai Pa"i (Ost. Drama Su Pap Bu Rood Ju Tha Thep Series: Koon Chai Roon Na Pee), 2013
- "Nee Kor Rak (feat. Varitthisa Limthammahisorn)" (Ost. Drama Nee Kor La Sa Kor Rak), 2014
- "Jab – Yo Chin Chinawut x Gavin Duval", 2017
- "Tian Mai Sin Sang" (Ost. Drama Sang Jak Poh Series: Tien Mai Sin Sang), 2017
- "Hua Jai Diew Kan (feat. Nantida Kaewbuasai)" (Ost. Drama Hua Jai Diew Kan), 2018
- "Bpert Jai" (Ost. Drama Lab Luang Jai), 2019
- "Kum Nai Jai" (Ost. Drama In Time With You), 2021

== Songs featuring Chinawut ==
- Song: First Love First Hurt – B-O-Y, 2008
- Song: Took krung tee Kid Tueng Ter – Auttapon Prakopkong, 2010
- Song: Whatever Whenever – Kitti Chiawongsakul, 2011
- Song: Sorry – Southside, 2011
- Song: Gae Ngao rue Aow Jing – Tatan, 2013

== Albums ==
Title	Date Released	Song List
CHIN UP	May 29, 2007	1. *Pak Mai Trong Gub Jai; 2. Body Language; 3. Kad Ruk Ter; 4. Chan Ja Pai Gub Ter; 5. My Way; 6. Jao kong Hua Jai; 7. Hey Beautiful; 8. Roo Chai Mai Wa Rak; 9. Term Mai Koey Tem; 10. Ying Soong Ying Suay; 11. Kor Kwam Jak Kon Rak Kao Feat. Kor MR. Saxman
May Be I'm Bad	December 16, 2008	1. Kuen Tee Nung; 2. *May Be I'm Bad; 3. Hua Jai Mai Chai Kra Dad; 4. Too Fast Too Serious; 5. Let Me Call; 6. Kong Kwan Tee Wang Plao; 7. Kwam Jam Suam; 8. Koo Keng; 9. Yak God Nang Fah; 10. Pab Tid Ta; 11. Kong Kwan Tee Wang Plao (Piano Version); 12. Mai Mee Krai Bok Hai Rak (Version: After Valentine's)
Ost: Series LOVE-18 (Rak Woon Wai Hua Jai 18)	September 30, 2009	1. Ni Feng (Ost: Series LOVE-18 (Rak Woon Wai Hua Jai 18)); 2. Nuan Liu (Ost: Series LOVE-18 (Rak Woon Wai Hua Jai 18)); 3. Kon Ru Jai (Ost: Series LOVE-18 (Rak Woon Wai Hua Jai 18))
I Believe	October 28, 2011	1. Never Give Up; 2. Lan La Feat. Bankk, Opal; 3. Na Tee Kong Hua Jai; 4. Mee Arai Hai Tum Eek Mai; 5. *Kuen Nee Yak Dai Kee Krung; 6. Ta Chan; 7. Nung Kam Tam Song Kam Tob; 8. Kwam Tung Jai Kong Puen Kao; 9. Chad tee Laew; 10. Mai Tai Yang Nae Non; 11. Don't Wake Me Up

- *= Promoted Single

== Character voices ==
Birdland Dan Ma Had sa Jan As Jemy (First episode date: June 4, 2011)

== International career ==
- Chin Up: Malaysia Album, 2010
- Yu Jian Ni (Chinese Singles), 2010
- Maybe I’m Bad: Malaysia Album, 2011
- OST. Love.18 (Chinese Singles), 2011

== TV shows ==
- 2017 – เปลี่ยนหน้าท้าโชว์ Sing Your Face Off (season 3) : Competitor Code: S4

WEEK	ORIGINAL ARTIST	SONG	NOTE
1	–	-	
2	Beyonce Knowles	Run the World (Girls)	
3	–	-	
4	Chadchai Sukawadee	Kid Tueng	
5	Sayan Sanya	Gai Ja	
6	Prisna Prysang	SHA-LA-LA-LA-LA	
7	Sobchai Graiyoonsen	Rak Ter	
8	-	-	
9	Justin Timberlake	My Love	
10	Amphol Lumpoon	Aow Pai Loey	
11	Mum Laconic	Kwam Lub	
13	Chester Bennington of the Linkin Park	Numb	

- 2017 – Indracusin also appeared as The Candle Mask in Thai T.V. Show, The Mask Singer Thailand Season 3 to sing a song Sunday Morning by Maroon 5 in group C. And lost to The Diamond Tiara Mask. He revealed his mask on November 9, 2017.

== Awards ==
Year	Award	Title	Result	Note
2013	Golden Television Award (รางวัลโทรทัศน์ทองคำ)	Best Character Voice Team (ทีมผู้พากย์การ์ตูนดีเด่น)	Won	As: Jemy From: Bird : Flying With Byrd (11 February 2014)
