= Yui Yatyer =

- ยุ้ย ญาติเยอะ
- Born: Jariya Preedakul; 19 February 1978 (age 48); Bangkok, Thailand
- Occupation: Singer
- Musical career
- Genre: Luk thung
- Years active: 1987–present
- Label: Four-S

Yui Yatyer (Thai: ยุ้ย ญาติเยอะ, RTGS: Yatyoe), real name Jariya Preedakul (จริยา ปรีดากูล), is a Luk thung singer.

== Biography ==
Yui Yatyer was born on 19 February 1978 and is the daughter of Chana-Saiyud Preedakul. Her stage career began when she won the TV variety series Concert Contest in 1987, and she has been a prominent figure in Thai entertainment ever since.

In 1995, she signed onto Four-S label. Her most popular songs include "Phok Miea Ma Dua Ruea" (Thai: พกเมียมาด้วยเหรอ), "Noo Chop Chop" (Thai: หนูช๊อบชอบ), "Lueak Miea Bok Maa" (Thai: เลิกเมียบอกมา), "Hoa Hai Duea" (Thai: ห่อให้ด้วย), "Khun Nai Khaa Ma Laeng Saab" (Thai: คุณนายขาแมลงสาบ).

She is married to Choo-Chat Phongtrakool (Thai: ชูชาติ ผ่องตระกูล) and they have one son.

== Discography ==
=== Albums ===
- Wan Raek Juea Luey ยุ้ยเป็นสาวแล้ว ชุด 1 วันแรกเจอเลย (1995)
- Loea Khee Taek Khee Taen ยุ้ยเป็นสาวแล้ว ชุด 2 หล่อขี้แตกขี้แตน (1995)
- Wan Raek Juea Luey ยุ้ยเป็นสาวแล้ว ชุด 3 ขึ้นเอ๊า ขึ้นเอา (1995)
- Lueak Miea Bok Maa ยุ้ยเป็นสาวแล้ว ชุด 4 เลิกเมียบอกมา (1996)
- Tieam Niew ยุ้ยเป็นสาวแล้ว ชุด 5 เต็มเหนี่ยว (1996)
- Rak Khon Loea Ngoa Khon Ruey ยุ้ยเป็นสาวแล้ว ชุด 6 รักคนหล่อง้อคนรวย (1997)
- Yoea Aa Rome ยุ้ยเป็นสาวแล้ว ชุด 7 เหยื่ออารมณ์ (1997)
- Phok Miea Ma Duea Ruea ยุ้ยเป็นสาวแล้ว ชุด 8 พกเมียมาด้วยเหรอ (1997)
- Hoa Hai Duea ยุ้ยเป็นสาวแล้ว ชุด 9 ห่อให้ด้วย (1998)
- Noo Chop Chop ยุ้ยเป็นสาวแล้ว ชุด 10 หนูช๊อบชอบ (1998)
- Mee Nee Mai Nia ยุ้ยเป็นสาวแล้ว ชุด 11 มีหนี้ไหมเนี่ย (1999)
- Khoe Noo Naa ยุ้ยเป็นสาวแล้ว ชุด 12 ขอหนูนะ (2000)
- Tam Ha Khoo Man ชุด 13 ตามหาคู่หมั้น (2001)
- Joe Hua Jai ชุด 14 จอหัวใจ (2001)
- Phuea Khao Thang Nan ชุด 15 ผัวเขาทั้งนั้น (2002)
- Ja Road Mai Niea ชุด 16 จะรอดไหมเนี่ย (2002)
- Rak Oaa Hai Roae Bap ชุด 17 รักอ้อให้รอแป๊บ (2003)
- Khad Khon Ru Jai ชุด 18 ขาดคนรู้ใจ (2003)
- Khon Thai Kluea Miea ชุด 19 คนไทยกลัวเมีย (2003)
- Sud Yod ชุด 20 สุดยอด (2004)
- Rak Kao Thee Khao Lueam ชุด 21 รักเก่าที่เขาลืม (2005)
- Man Tong Yang Nan See ชุด 22 มันต้องยังงั้นซิ (2005)
- Khon Thai Dueam ชุด 23 คนไทยเดิม (2006)
- Naa Taa Khun Khun ชุด 24 หน้าตาคุ้นคุ้น (2007)
- Phood Mai Kid ชุด 25 พูดไม่คิด (2008)
- Yuei Maa Laew Jaa ชุด 26 ยุ้ยมาแล้วจ้า (2010)
- Phee Klam Hua ชุด 27 ผีคลำหัว (2018)
