= Princess Kill =

Thai entertainer duo

PRINCESS KILL
- ณัฐณชา ครูศากยวงศ์, ณัฐณิชา ครูศากยวงศ์
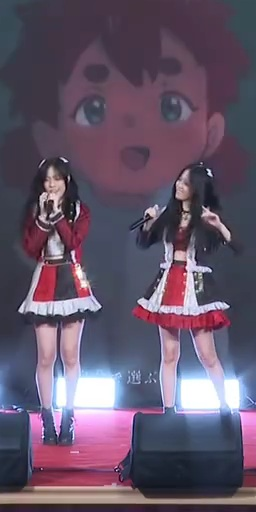
- Princess Kill performing at Bilibili Anime Carnival 2023 in 2024; NistY (left) and NistA (right)
- Born: Nutnacha Krusagayavong Nutnicha Krusagayavong; August 10, 1997 (age 29); Bangkok, Thailand
- Other names: NistA (นิสต้า), NistY (นิสตี้)
- Education: Ramkhamhaeng University – Faculty of Humanities (English-Literature) (BA), Stamford International University (MBA)
- Occupations: Singer-songwriter; Rapper; Actress; Model; Voice actress; Writer
- Awards: Trinity College London Awards 2017 (Distinction)

Princess Kill (stylized in all caps) is a Thai singer-songwriter, rapper, model, actress and voice actress duo, consisting of twin sisters—"NistA (Thai: นิสต้า)" Nutnacha Krusagayavong (Thai: ณัฐณชา ครูศากยวงศ์); the elder; and "NistY (Thai: นิสตี้)" Nutnicha Krusagayavong (Thai: ณัฐณิชา ครูศากยวงศ์); the younger.

== Career ==
The name, "Princess Kill", is a shortened form of "The Princess has made a kill" or "Princess Killer".

NistA and NistY were trainees at South Korean companies, with experience in the entertainment, music, and publishing industries. Their international academic background and work with people from various nationalities and backgrounds has made them familiar with multicultural societies.

NistA performed 'Octopus's Dream (Thai Version)', a single from DGRIDAPICTURES's global album 'Octopus's Dream', released on May 5th (Korean Children's Day) and distributed by Warner Music Korea. The project aims to share the song's supportive and empowering message with children around the world, encouraging them to pursue their dreams with confidence. Octopus's Dream was originally sung in Korean by singer-songwriter Ahn Ye-eun and first appeared on her third album, OOO.

They also draw cartoons, comics, and related materials; write novels, fiction, and scholarly articles in several fields (mostly in English); and produce music and dance choreography. They also sometimes do translation and interpretation work.

=== 2022–2024: Blackforce ===
They were revealed as 3rd generation members of a Thai girl group, Blackforce, on November 11, 2022.

While part of Blackforce, they took part in several prominent events, including Japan Expo Thailand (the largest all-Japan event in Asia), the Thai-Japan Iconic Music Fest (the biggest Thai-Japan music festival in Thailand), and the Bilibili Anime Carnival 2023.

They additionally received invitations to numerous press screenings organized by major Thai film production and distribution companies, including Sahamongkol Film, along with Thai anime licensing companies such as DEX.

=== 2024–present: PRINCESS KILL ===
Before joining Blackforce, they had already been active in the entertainment, music, and publishing industries. After the group’s disbandment in April 2024, the twins continued as a duo under the name "PRINCESS KILL", their original name before joining Blackforce.

== Awards ==
- Clean and Clear Idol Year 3 (2010) and Year 4 (2011), alongside Frung Narikun and Pang Mitchai (daughter of Thai Luk thung singer and Likay actor Chaiya Mitchai).
- KPN Music Competition 2012 (finalists).
- NistY is one of the Trinity College London Awards 2017's winners (Distinction).
