= Chisanucha Tantimedh =

Thai actor and singer (born 2000)

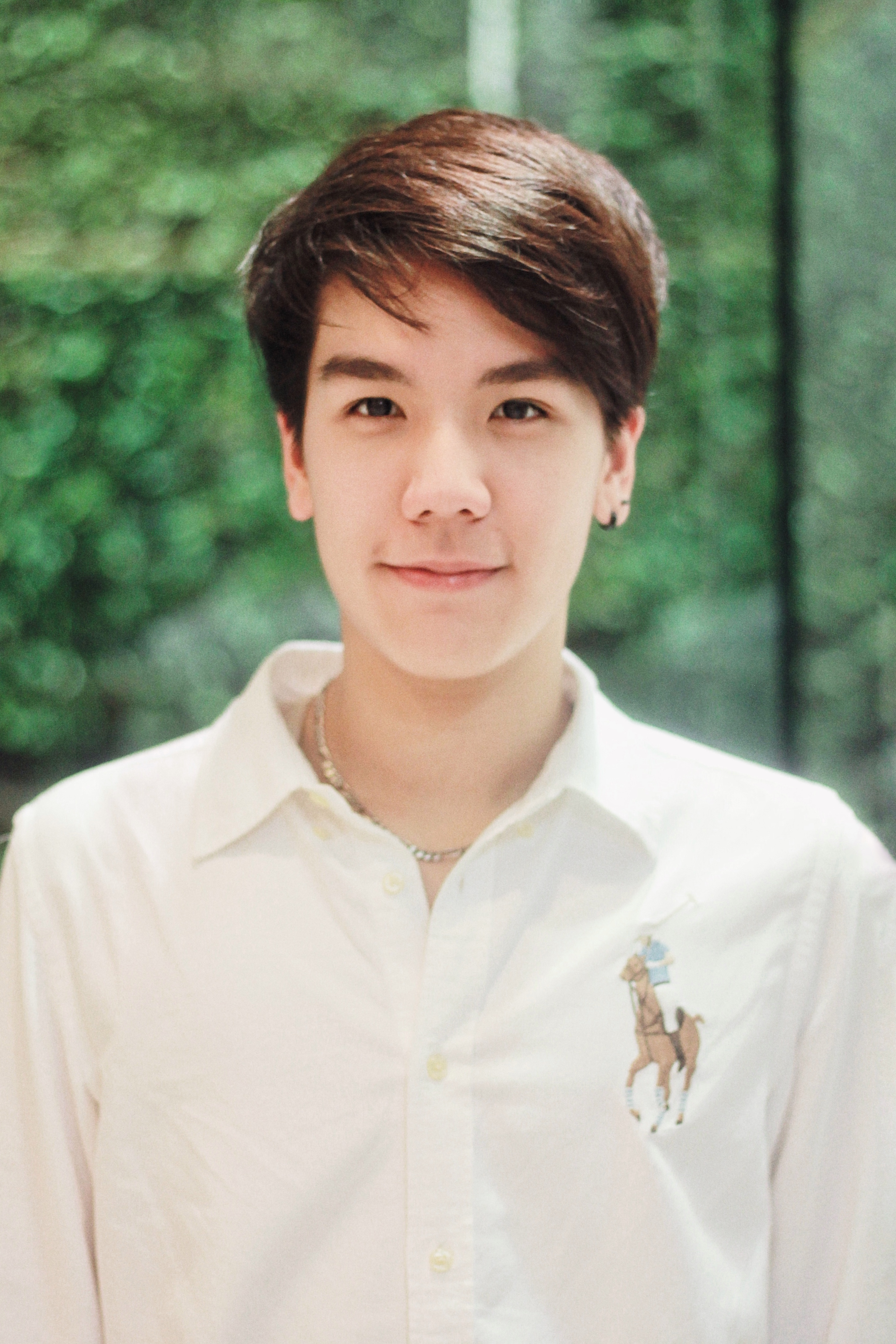

Background information
- Also known as: Mew, MEYOU
- Born: Chisanucha Tantimedh (Thai: ชิษณุชา ตันติเมธ); 7 January 2000 (age 26); Bangkok, Thailand
- Genres: Hip-hop
- Occupations: Actor, singer
- Years active: 2017 – present
- Label: GMM Music (White Music)

Chisanucha Tantimedh (Thai: ชิษณุชา ตันติเมธ; born 7 January 2000), nicknamed Mew (มิว) and performing under the stage name MEYOU, is a Thai singer and actor.

He is known for winning the "MBO THE AUDITION New Faces, Ready to Be Born" contest by the record label MBO, a subsidiary of GMM Grammy. He debuted on 17 January 2017 his own first single, "Mai Koei Kit Kae Puen" ("I'm Not Your Friend").

== Early life and education ==
Chitsanucha was born on 7 January 2000. He graduated from high school at New Sathorn International School (the same school as Third Lapat of TRINITY, NistA and NistY of PRINCESS KILL, Ploy Amandine, and Mintchyy Samatchaya). He has attended at the Faculty of Communication Arts, Chulalongkorn University, International Program.

== Career ==
In 2016, he made his acting debut in a series produced by GMM Bravo called Love Rhythms: Yak Yang Dang Dang, in which he performed with contestants from the MBO THE AUDITION project. After that, he continued to act in various series, including Ped Idol and Rak Chan Nai, which were series on MBO Teen Entertainment.

== Discography ==
=== Extended play ===
รายชื่ออีพี แสดงรายชื่อเพลง
| EPs | Information | Song list |
|---|---|---|
| Wednesday Child | 19 November 2021; Released under White Music | 1. ถาม; 2. ผ่านมานานแล้ว; 3. Girls; 4. สับสน (No One); 5. สร่าง (Sober) feat. ขัน ไทยเทเนี่ยม; 6. รู้เอง |

=== Singles ===
| Year | เพลง | Label |
|---|---|---|
| 2017 | "ไม่เคยคิดแค่เพื่อน" ('I'm Not Your Friend") | MBO |
| 2017 | "เวทมนตร์" ("Magic") | MBO |
| 2018 | "Goodnight" ft. stickyricekillah & ณัฐชา เดอซูซ่า | Independent |
| 2018 | "พอจะรู้" | Independent |
| 2018 | "อีกแล้ว" feat. Jigsaw | Independent |
| 2018 | "อาจจะ" feat. Ziggarice | Independent |
| 2018 | "ก่อนลา" | Independent |
| 2019 | "ภาวนา" | White Music |
| 2020 | "NO MAKEUP" feat. ZIGGAVOY | White Music |
| 2020 | "พูดจริง" | White Music |
| 2020 | "รู้ตัวอีกที" | White Music |
| 2020 | "วอน (เพลงประกอบภาพยนตร์ วอนเธอ)" | White Music |
| 2020 | "december" | Independent |
| 2021 | "พัทยา (Pattaya)" | Independent |
| 2021 | "ถาม" | White Music |
| 2021 | "ผ่านมานานแล้ว" | White Music |
| 2021 | "สับสน" ("No One") | White Music |
| 2021 | "สร่าง (Sober) feat. ขัน ไทยเทเนี่ยม" | White Music |
| 2021 | "รู้เอง" | White Music |
| 2021 | "Girls" | White Music |

=== Collaborations ===
| Year | เพลง | With |
|---|---|---|
| 2016 | "12345 I Love You" | MBO artists |
| 2016 | "วัดใจ" (ประกอบรายการ MBO The Idol Game หน้าใหม่ พร้อมเกิด) | MBO artists |
| 2016 | "พ่อเล่าให้ฟัง" (เพลงเทิดพระเกียรติพระบาทสมเด็จพระปรมินทรมหาภูมิพลอดุลยเดช) | MBO artists |
| 2017 | "ไม่เคยคิดแค่เพื่อน (Special Version)" | Jannine Weigel |
| 2019 | "ไม่อยากเหงาแล้ว" ("Call Me") | Ink Waruntorn |

=== Original soundtracks ===
| Year | Sog | With |
|---|---|---|
| 2016 | "อยากร้องดังดัง" (เพลงประกอบซีรีส์ "Love Rhythms ตอน อยากจะร้องดังดัง") | MBO artists |

=== Series ===
| Year | เรื่อง | Role |
|---|---|---|
| 2016 | Love Rhythms ตอน อยากจะร้องดังดัง | Huay (ฮ้วย) |
| 2016 | เป็ดIdol | Jao (จ๊าว) / Bi (บี) |
| 2017 | รักชั้นนัย | Mon (ม่อน) |
| 2020 | เล่ห์รตี | Friend of Satayu |
