= New Sathorn International School =

- โรงเรียนนานาชาติสาทรใหม่
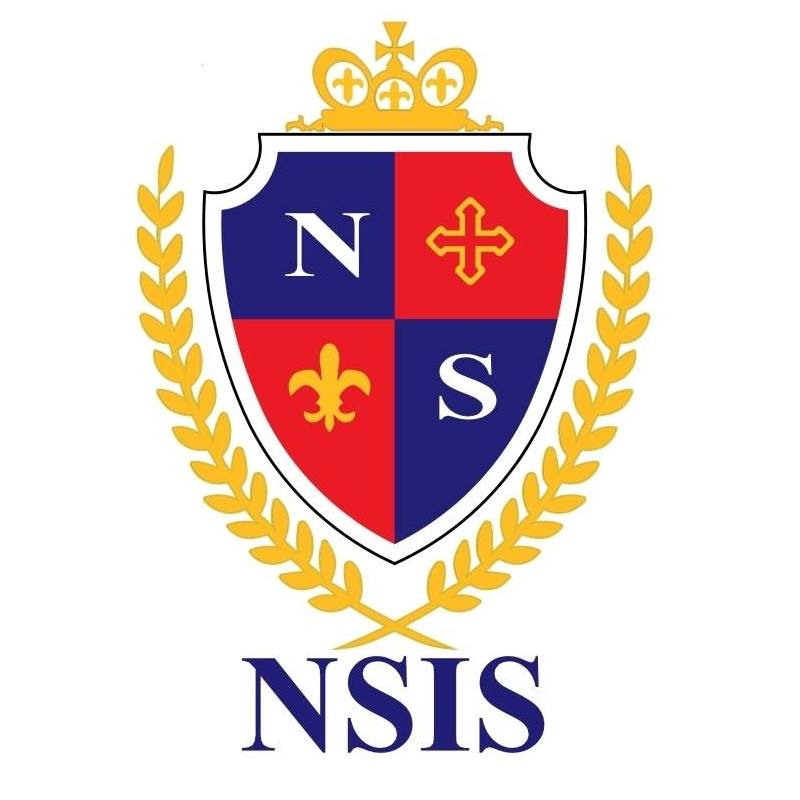
- 289 Soi 24 Narathiwat Road, Chongnonsi, Yannawa, Bangkok 10120, Thailand; Bangkok; Thailand

Information
- Other name: NSIS
- School type: International School
- Religious affiliation: Christian
- Founded: 2004
- Status: Closed
- Closed: 2022
- Grades: Kindergarten – Grade 12
- Gender: Co-education
- Age range: 2 - 18
- Language: English

New Sathorn International School (Thai: โรงเรียนนานาชาติสาทรใหม่) or NSIS is a private Christian international school located on Narathiwat Ratchanakharin 24 in the Sathorn business district of Bangkok, Thailand. Founded in 2004, the school provides co-educational instruction from Kindergarten through Grade 12.

NSIS utilizes the International Baccalaureate (IB) curriculum, delivered by a faculty of native English-speaking educators. The school is characterized by its diverse international community, with a student body representing over 30 different nationalities.

The school has now changed to Aster International School Bangkok (Thai: โรงเรียนนานาชาติแอสเตอร์ กรุงเทพ).

== Notable alumni ==
- Third Lapat, Thai singer, actor, model, and member of the Thai boy group TRINITY
- Mew MEYOU, Thai singer and actor
- NistA and NistY, Thai singer-songwriter, rapper, model and actress twin sisters; members of Thai musical duo PRINCESS KILL
- Ploy Amandine, Miss Universe Pathum Thani 2025 (MUT 2025 Top 5)
- Mintchyy Samatchaya, Thai content creator
