= The Sixth Lie =

Japanese electronic band

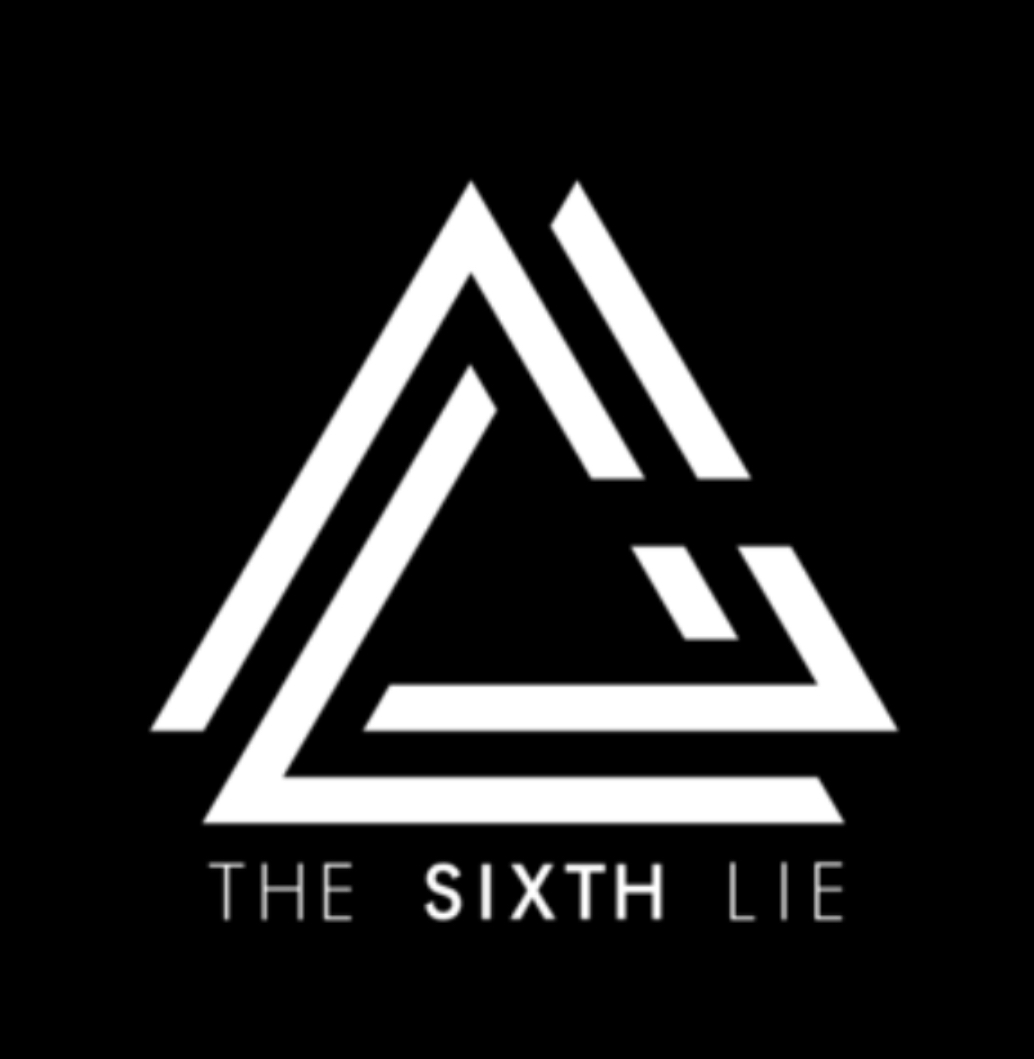
- The Sixth Lie

Background information
- Origin: Tokyo
- Genres: Electronic rock; digital music; dubstep; EDM; heavy rock; electronica
- Years active: 2015–present
- Labels: audio Avant-Garde (2016–present); NBCUniversal Entertainment Japan (2018–present) euclid agency (Management)
- Members: Arata（vocals） Reiji（guitar, programmer, keyboards） Ray（drums, sampler）
- Past members: Ryusei (3rd bassist） Hiroto（2nd bassist） Tatsutaage "Tatsuo" (1st bassist)
- Website: thesixthlie.jp

The Sixth Lie (stylized in all caps) is a Japanese electronic band formed in May 2015 in Tokyo, Japan. Their music is known for its hybrid style inspired by the latest western music, and their overall science fiction-inspired theme connected to near future and outer space.

They held their first world tour from June 2017, which gathered 2,500 visitors and resulted in sold out CD's at venues.

== Members ==
- Arata (Vocals)
  Likes both Japanese and western EDM and rock, and is familiar with music of many different genres. He is known for clear vocals with a vocal range of 3 octaves. He was responsible for composing the band's initial songs. He was focused in football during elementary school and junior high school, and was an athlete aiming for Hakone Ekiden with long-distance running. At times he plays the keyboard during their shows.
  When he joined the band, Reiji and Ray invited him to a café, but he wanted them to listen to his singing, so he told them to meet him in a karaoke room. He says he doesn't remember this incident himself.
- Reiji (Guitar, programming, keyboards)
  He is in charge of composing and arranging all of their songs, with a hybrid sound that has been inspired by the latest western music as his weapon. One of the original members of the band from back when they were formed. He is known for his clean guitars with a lot of arpeggio, but also plays heavy riffs depending on songs. During junior high school he played at Junior Olympics as the representative of Gunma Prefecture in volleyball. During high school he played at Inter-High School Championships as the representative of Gunma Prefecture. He also aimed for All-Japan Volleyball High School Tournament, but unfortunately lost in the finals. He used to be Japan's number one for smartphone game "Avabel Online". He won the Crash Royale section during "eSports Star League Battle Championship #1", an eSports tournament for celebrities held on January 8, 2018.
- Ray (Drums, sampler)
  He is in charge of the lyrics for all songs and the direction and editing of all of their music videos and live videos. He also makes videos for other artists. The CD covers are also designed by Ray. He is currently second year student at a master's course in University of Tokyo, and he is studying drones and artificial intelligence. Together with Reiji, he is one of the original members of the band. He likes progressive rock from the 70's, and you can see his interest in this genre from his drum phrases with a lot of action. During some songs he also plays synth drum pads, and with that makes a flower bloom to their electronic band sound.

== History ==
2015

- Goes through a few member changes from the previous band, and gets their current formation.
- In November, they release the music video for "Wake Up Your Fire", and their futuristic sound and the music video directed and edited by Ray gains high praising from the music industry.

2016

- They make a contract with euclid agency in May.
- They release their first album "Integral" on 7 September.
- Their first headlining show "Live Integral ver.1.0" is held at Shibuya Cyclone on 16 October.
- They were selected to perform as the opening act for Slipknot's rock festival "Knotfest Japan 2016". They performed in front of 20,000 people together with Slipknot, Deftones, Disturbed, hoobastank, Issues, SiM, Rottengraffty, Oldcodex, coldrain, Crystal Lake, and more.

2017

- They released their second album "Differential" on 25 January. The album gets highly praised due to the overall theme and artwork that are opposing the previous release. They gathered a lot of attention by taking over both sides of Tower Records Shibuya Store escalators.
- They held a headlining show "Live Differential ver.1.0" on 4 February.
- Released digital limited single "Go On" on 6 June. Their cover version of "Oh No" by Bring Me the Horizon was included as a coupling song.
- From their headlining show "Live Triangle ver.1.0" on 10 June, they started their world tour "Live Triangle", and toured Japan, United Kingdom, France, Germany and Canada. Despite it being their first overseas tour, there were a total of 2,500 visitors in the tour, and they sold out CD's at the venues.
- The Sixth Lie's bassist Hiroto to depart from band in December.

2018

- They performed at "Japan Expo Thailand" in Bangkok, Thailand on 27 and 28 January.
- Their third album "SINGularity" was released on 7 March.
- They performed the ending theme for the anime adaptation of Golden Kamuy, which will air in April 2018.
- Will be performing at Japan Expo in Paris, France in July.

2025

- The Sixth Lie's bassist Ryusei to depart from the band in late February.

== Etymology ==
The name of the band is a reference to the French composer Claude Debussy, who said: "Art is the most beautiful of all lies." The band's name is an indication of band's aim, "to create a lie so beautiful that it cannot be full experienced by the five senses".

== Discography ==
=== Mini-Albums ===
	Release date	Title	Format	Product number	Track list	Details
1st	30 May 2015	The Sixth Lie	12cmCD	–	全6曲: 1. Kotaenaki Kono Sekai De (答えなきこの世界で); 2. Into the Darkest Blue; 3. The Calling (feat. Matthias Freissler); 4. Kotaenaki Kono Sekai De (答えなきこの世界で)(Instrumental); 5. Into the Darkest Blue(Instrumental); 6. The Calling (feat. Matthias Freissler)(Instrumental)	Limited to 300 copies (Sold online and at live shows)

=== Album ===
	Release date	Title	Format	Product number	Track list	Details
1st	7 September 2016	Intgral	12cmCD	EMAG-0001 EMAG-0002	全6曲: 1. Wake Up Your Fire; 2. In This Mirror; 3. Get Higher; 4. Never Hurry Me; 5. Stay Back; 6. I Will Find You	Regular Edition First Press Limited Special Package Edition
2nd	25 January 2017	Differential	12cmCD	EMAG-0003 EMAG-0004	全6曲: 1. Another Dimension; 2. Endless Night; 3. Next Trier; 4. A Planet in Your Eyes; 5. The Walls; 6. Hologram	Regular Edition First Press Limited Special Package Edition
3rd	25 February 2018	SINGularity	12cmCD	EMAG-0005 EMAG-0006	全6曲: 1. One More Spark; 2. When You Forget; 3. Go On; 4. SINGularity; 5. Fall in the Sky; 6. Come Back to My Dreams; 7. Heavy	Regular Edition First Press Limited Special Package Edition
4th	27 November 2019	Perfect Lies	12cmCD	GNCA-1563 GNCA-1562	全12曲: 1. Sun & Moon; 2. Burn to Fly; 3. Shadow is the Light; 4. Phone Call; 5. Scissors; 6. Massive Attack; 7. Secret Town; 8. Hibana; 9. In the Rain; 10. Action Phase; 11. Cassette Tape; 12. Everything Lost	Regular Edition First Press Limited Special Package Edition

=== Single ===
	Release date	Title	Format	Product number	収録曲	備考
Digital	6 June 2017	Go On	Digital	–	全3曲: 1. Go On; 2. Oh No（Bring Me The Horizon Cover）; 3. A Planet In Your Eyes – Piano Ver. -（iTunes Store, Apple Music Limited）	Digital Single
1st	6 June 2018	Hibana	12cmCD	GNCA-0532	全4曲: 1. Hibana; 2. Flash of a Spear; 3. Hibana＜Instrumental＞; 4. Flash of a Spear＜Instrumental＞	Ending theme for TV Anime "Golden Kamuy"
Digital	6 December 2018	Setsuna	Digital	–	全1曲: 1. Setsuna -（iTunes Store, Apple Music Limited）	Digital Single
2nd	21 August 2019	Shadow is the Light	12cmCD	GNCA-0596	全4曲: 1. Shadow is the Light; 2. P A R A D O X 3. Shadow is the Light＜Instrumental＞; 4. P A R A D O X＜Instrumental＞	Opening theme for TV Anime "Toaru Kagaku no Accelerator"
3rd	2 December 2020	Yuusetsu	12cmCD	GNCA-0631	全4曲: 1. Yuusetsu; 2. Last Page; 3. Yuusetsu＜Instrumental＞; 4. Last Page＜Instrumental＞	Ending theme for TV Anime "Golden Kamuy" Season 3

==== Collaborations ====
	Year	Songs	Peak Oricon chart positions	Album
1st	2022	Level (with Nagi Yanagi)	44	—N/a

== Main shows ==
=== Headlining Shows ===
- 2016/10/16 – Headlining Show "Live Integral ver.1.0" Shibuya Cyclone
- 2017/02/04 – Headlining Show "Live Differential ver.1.0" Shibuya Cyclone
- 2017/06/10 – Headlining Show "Live Triangle ver.1.0" Shibuya Cyclone
- 2018/02/03 – Headlining Show "Live SINGularity ver.1.0" Shibuya Rex

=== Main Events ===
- 2016/11/05 – Knotfest Japan 2016 Opening Act
- 2017/07/14 – Hyper Japan, London, United Kingdom
- 2017/07/15 – Hyper Japan, London, United Kingdom
- 2017/08/11 – Animethon, Edmonton, Canada
- 2017/08/12 – Animethon, Edmonton, Canada
- 2017/08/13 – Animethon, Edmonton, Canada
- 2018/01/27 – Japan Expo Thailand, Bangkok, Thailand
- 2018/01/28 – Japan Expo Thailand, Bangkok, Thailand
- 2018/06/05 - Japan Expo France, Paris, France
- 2019/06/04 - Japan Expo France, Paris, France
- 2019/06/05 - Japan Expo France, Paris, France

== Trivia ==
- THE SIXTH LIE was originally formed by the members Reiji and Ray; the two had met online prior to the formation of the band.
- According to Reiji, Hiroto had to wear a mask because he has a youthful baby face.
- Ray likes to go to art exhibitions to get inspiration for the lyrics.
- Hiroto was a professional gamer.
- Hiroto started playing bass because of Red Hot Chili Peppers, an American rock band.
- Arata gained his interest in rock music after listening to 'Ready Steady Go', a single by L'Arc～en～Ciel from their album Smile.
- Reiji and Hiroto like to play games in their spare time.
- Arata's hobbies are running and playing football. He also likes to go for a walk in Shibuya or Harajuku in his spare time.
- Ray likes to either play a game or study in his spare time.
- Arata likes spicy food.
- Arata collaborated with NistA and NistY of PRINCESS KILL (a Thai singer-songwriter, rapper, model, and actress duo) to dance together in a challenge for T6L's single 'Wonderland (Thai Version).'
- Arata and Ryusei are friends with NistA and NistY from PRINCESS KILL.
