= Medialink =

Content distributor and brand licensing company of Hong Kong

Medialink Group Limited
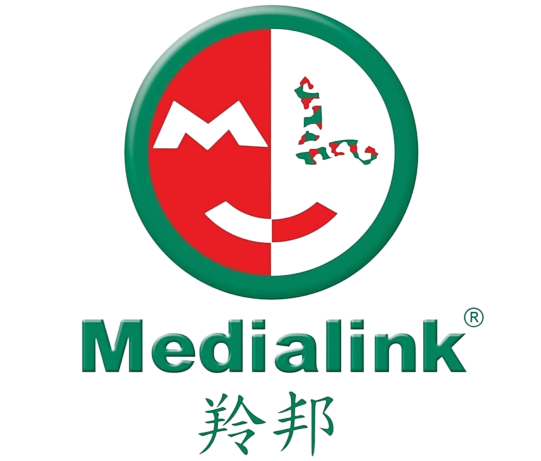
- Trade name: Medialink
- Formerly: Medialink Film and Television (1994–2000); Medialink Entertainment (2000–2018)
- Company type: Public
- Traded as: SEHK: 2230
- ISIN: KYG5958A1013
- Industry: Entertainment and retail
- Founded: March 1994; 32 years ago
- Founders: Lovinia Chiu; Noletta Chiu
- Headquarters: Tsim Sha Tsui, Kowloon, Hong Kong
- Area served: Worldwide (primarily Asian markets)
- Key people: Lovinia Chiu (CEO, chairman and executive director); Noletta Chiu (executive director); Ching Fung Ma (CFO and executive director)
- Products: Anime, motion pictures, and merchandise
- Services: Content distribution; Brand licensing
- Revenue: ▼HK$315.122 million (2020)
- Operating income: ▼HK$50 million (2020)
- Net income: ▼HK$36 million (2020)
- Total assets: ▲HK$619.092 million (2020)
- Owner: RLA Company Limited (75%)
- Number of employees: 99
- Parent: RLA Company Limited
- Subsidiaries: MediaLink Licensing Holdings; Medialink Entertainment Holdings; Medialink Investment Holdings
- Website: medialink.com.hk

Medialink Group Limited is a content distributor and licensor based in Kowloon, Hong Kong specializing in the distribution of Japanese anime and brand licensing. Its offices are located at Mody Road, Tsim Sha Tsui.

Registered from Hong Kong Companies Registry, Medialink was founded as Medialink International Limited by Lovinia Chiu in March 1994. In 2018, co-founders Lovinia and Noletta Chiu integrated Medialink Entertainment and Medialink Animation International into the Medialink Group, which was listed on the Hong Kong Stock Exchange in 2019.

== Anime distribution ==
Medialink Entertainment handles the content acquisition and distribution of Japanese anime in Southeast Asia, South Asia, Mainland China, Taiwan, Hong Kong, Macau, Micronesia, and Polynesia. The company does not directly release its own properties, but instead selects some anime titles for release on home video through its distribution partners such as Asia Video Publishing in Hong Kong, CaiChang International Multimedia in Taiwan, Dream Express (DEX) and previously Rose Media and Entertainment in Thailand.

In addition, the company also sub-licenses select titles to streaming services and TV stations. In 2018, the company launched a new brand called Ani-One to simulcast new anime titles and distribute older series on their partnered platforms. Its notable clients include Netflix, Animax Asia, iQIYI, Bilibili, Dimsum, and local streaming services in select served regions. It also offers anime contents on its own YouTube channel since October 2019. On 10 April 2021, Medialink announced that they had reached a distribution partnership with Mediacorp, with Medialink titles being made available to stream on meWATCH. On 1 July 2021, Medialink launched a membership program called Ani-One ULTRA to simulcast select titles and old anime series under its Ani-One YouTube channel.

In 2019, Medialink began co-producing and co-funding anime projects.

== Other businesses ==
=== Brand licensing ===
Medialink Animation International manages the brand licensing business. It is involved in the licensing of various brands, including Garfield, Popeye, Betty Boop, The Little Prince, and My Hero Academia.

=== Ani-Mall ===
In 2020, Medialink started venturing into the e-commerce business during the COVID-19 pandemic. Launched in August 2020, Ani-Mall is an online store selling anime-themed clothes, toys and other merchandise from Medialink's licensed brands.

=== Ani-Kids ===
On 19 September 2020, Medialink launched a new educational entertainment VOD platform on MyTV SUPER for children in preschools.

=== Ani-Mi ===
On 18 October 2023, Medialink announced the partnership with Bilibili to handled the distribution & licensing for their donghua series in Southeast Asian markets, resulting the launch of Ani-Mi VOD platform.

=== Movie production and distribution ===
Medialink was also evolved in movie production, such as One Second Champion and Drifting with mm2 Entertainment. They also responsible for releasing Haikyu!! The Dumpster Battle anime film in the Asian markets as well.
