= Chaiya Suriyan =

- ไชยา สุริยัน
- Chaiya Suriyan in 1960s
- Born: ML Aphirat Charunrot; 7 June 1934; Siam
- Died: 26 October 1990 (aged 56)
- Occupations: Actor; film director
- Years active: 1957–1990
- Known for: Kyaw Set from Phu Chana Sip Thit (1966–1967); Tone from Tone (1970)
- Spouse: Tiamkhae Kunchon na Ayudhya
- Awards: Three-time consecutive Golden Doll Award winner (1962–1964)

Chaiya Suriyan (Thai: ไชยา สุริยัน; June 7, 1934 – October 26, 1990) was a Thai actor who was regarded as one of the icons of the Thai film industry during its golden age, alongside Mitr Chaibancha and Sombat Metanee. He was best known for his role as Kyaw Set in the 1966–1967 film series Phu Chana Sip Thit, and won the Golden Doll Award for Best Actor for three consecutive years from 1962 to 1964.

== Career ==
He entered the film industry in 1957 with Hao Dong (เห่าดง – The Bush Cobra), a superheroine film based on the novel of the same name by Phanom Tian, in which he starred opposite Amara Asavananda.

The role that brought him his greatest recognition and fame was Kyaw Set, the protagonist of Phu Chana Sip Thit (ผู้ชนะสิบทิศ – The Conqueror of the Ten Directions), which was produced in three installments between 1966 and 1967. The films were based on the historical novel of the same name by Jacob, which was inspired by the life of Bayinnaung, the Burmese warrior king of the Toungoo Empire in the second half of the 16th century. Two songs from the films, performed by Charin Nantanakorn, became widely known and have remained popular to this day.

He also won the Golden Doll Award for Best Actor for three consecutive years, from 1962 to 1964.

== Personal life and death ==
Suriyan's real name was Mom Luang Aphirat Charunrot. He was a great-great-grandson of Prince Charat Phornpatiphan, the founder of the Charunrot royal family line. Prince Charat Phornpatiphan was a son of Pinklao, the second king during the reign of King Mongkut (Rama IV).

He married Tiamkhae Kunchon na Ayudhya, the daughter of Mom Luang Khab Kunchon, a military officer and politician who was a close associate of Field Marshal Plaek Phibunsongkhram. The couple had three children, two daughters and a son.

He died of cancer on October 26, 1990, at the age of 56. His royal cremation ceremony was held at Wat Thepsirintrawas Ratchaworawihan.
