= Nutnicha Krusagayavong =

Thai singer (born 1997)

- ณัฐณิชา ครูศากยวงศ์
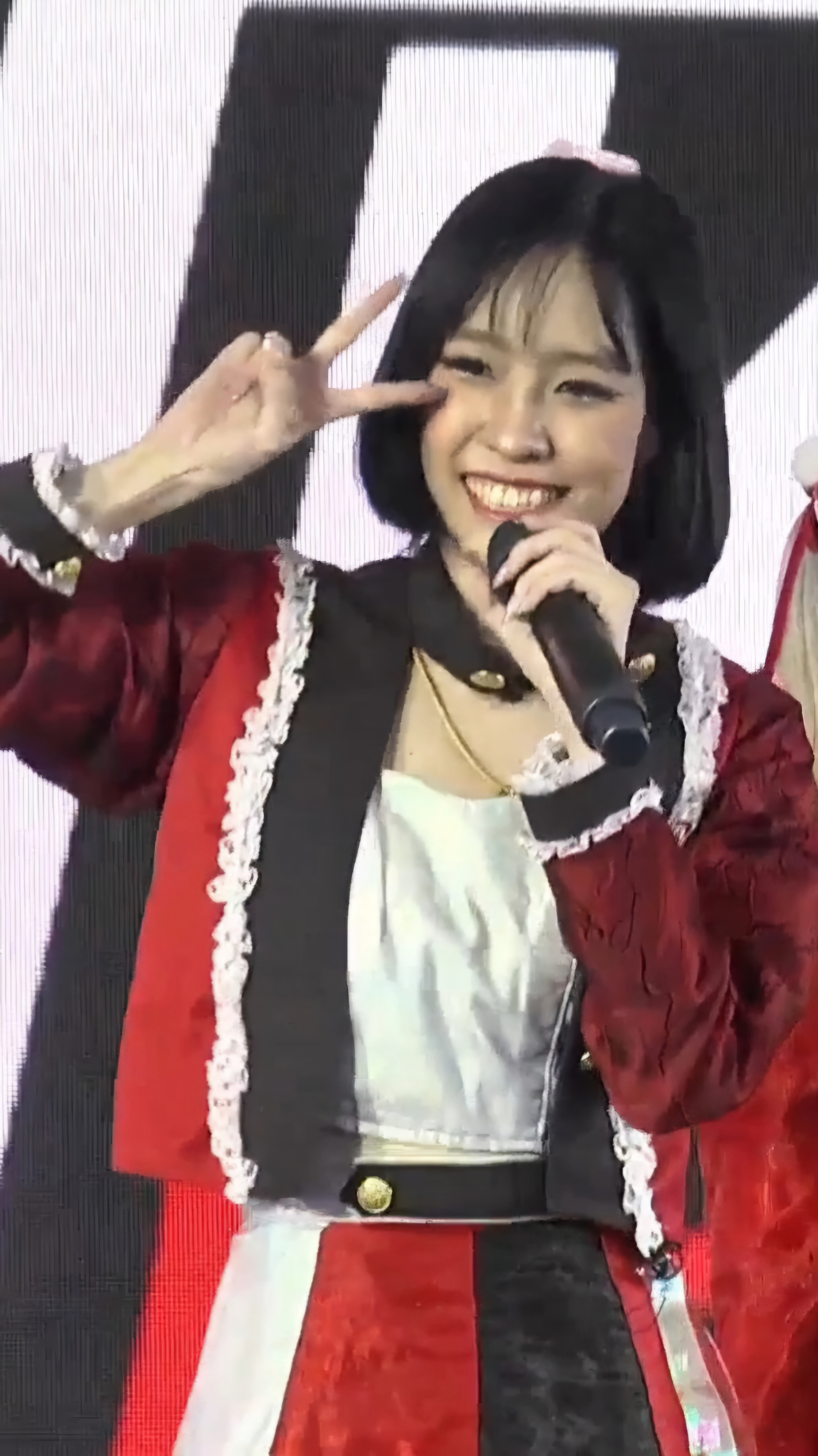
- NistY performing at Japan Expo Thailand in 2024
- Born: August 10, 1997 (age 28); Bangkok, Thailand
- Other name: NistY (นิสตี้)
- Education: Ramkhamhaeng University – Faculty of Humanities (English-Literature) (BA), Stamford International University (MBA)
- Occupations: Singer-songwriter; Rapper; Actress; Model; Voice actress; Writer
- Awards: Trinity College London Awards 2017 (Distinction)

Nutnicha Krusagayavong (Thai: ณัฐณิชา ครูศากยวงศ์; born 10 August 1997), nicknamed NistY (Thai: นิสตี้), is a Thai singer-songwriter, rapper, model, actress and voice actress. She is a member of the Thai musical duo Princess Kill, alongside her older twin sister, NistA Nutnacha.

== Name ==
The name, "NistY", was intended to complement NistA. Due to frequent mispronunciations as "Nasty", she adopted the personal branding line: "N-I-S-T-Y, NistY, not NastY".

== Career ==
Both NistY and NistA were trainees at South Korean companies. They are deeply involved in the entertainment, music, and publishing industries. Their international education, combined with their work alongside people from diverse nationalities and backgrounds, has made them familiar with multicultural societies.

Apart from her screen presence, she also creates cartoons, comics, and related materials; writes novels, fiction, and scholarly articles (mostly in English); and produces music and choreography. She occasionally does translation and interpretation work as well.

=== 2022–2024: Blackforce ===
On November 11, 2022, NistY and NistA were revealed as 3rd generation members of a Thai girl group, Blackforce.

While part of Blackforce, she took part in several prominent events, including Japan Expo Thailand (the largest all-Japan event in Asia), the Thai-Japan Iconic Music Fest (the biggest Thai-Japan music festival in Thailand), and the Bilibili Anime Carnival 2023.

She additionally received invitations to numerous press screenings organized by major Thai film production and distribution companies, including Sahamongkol Film, along with Thai anime licensing companies such as DEX.

=== 2024–present: PRINCESS KILL ===
Prior to her time with Blackforce, she had established herself across the entertainment, music, and publishing sectors. When the group disbanded in April 2024, she and her twin reclaimed their original identity, performing as the duo "Princess Kill".

== Awards ==
- Clean and Clear Idol Year 3 (2010) and Year 4 (2011), alongside NistA (her twin), Frung Narikun and Pang Mitchai (daughter of Thai Luk thung singer and Likay actor Chaiya Mitchai).
- KPN Music Competition 2012 (finalists).
- She is one of the Trinity College London Awards 2017's winners (Distinction).
