= Nutnacha Krusagayavong =

Thai singer-songwriter (born 1997)

- ณัฐณชา ครูศากยวงศ์
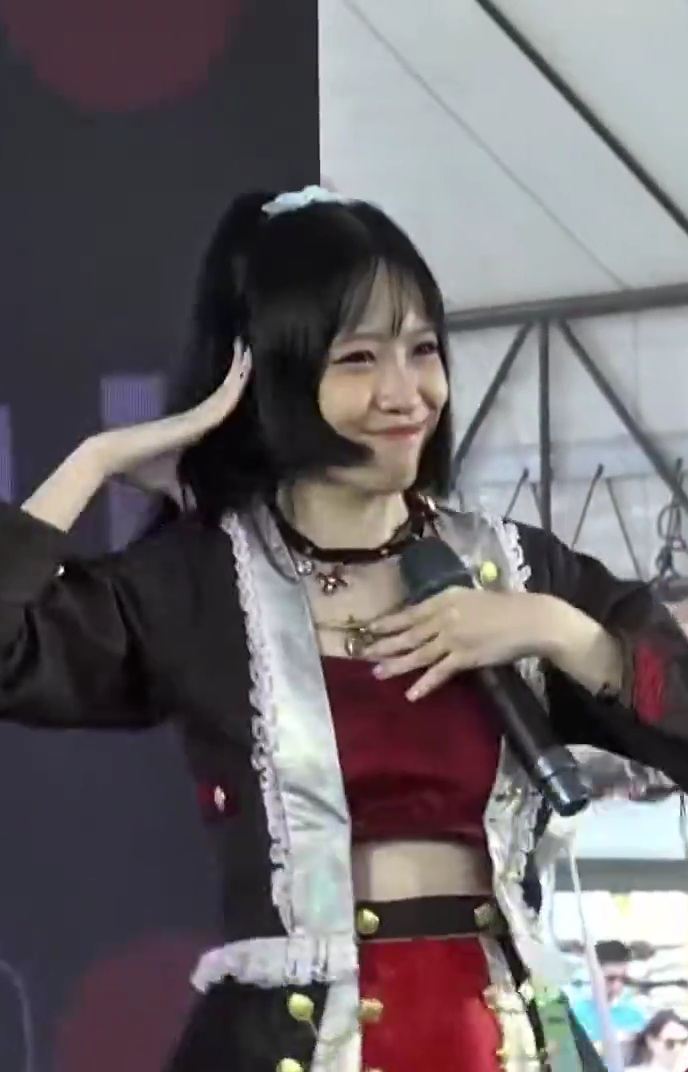
- NistA performing at Japan Expo Thailand in 2024
- Born: August 10, 1997 (age 29); Bangkok, Thailand
- Other name: NistA (นิสต้า)
- Education: Ramkhamhaeng University – Faculty of Humanities (English-Literature) (BA), Stamford International University (MBA)
- Occupations: Singer-songwriter; Rapper; Actress; Model; Voice actress; Writer

Nutnacha Krusagayavong (Thai: ณัฐณชา ครูศากยวงศ์; born 10 August 1997), nicknamed NistA (Thai: นิสต้า), is a Thai singer-songwriter, rapper, model, actress and voice actress. She is a member of the Thai musical duo Princess Kill, alongside her younger twin sister, NistY Nutnicha.

== Career ==
NistA and NistY were trainees at South Korea companies. The two are deeply involved in the entertainment, music, and publishing industries. Their international education, combined with their work alongside people from diverse nationalities and backgrounds, has made them familiar with multicultural societies.

NistA performed "Octopus's Dream (Thai Version)", a single from DGRIDAPICTURES's global album "Octopus's Dream", released on May 5th (Korean Children's Day) and distributed by Warner Music Korea. The project aims to share the song's supportive and empowering message with children around the world, encouraging them to pursue their dreams with confidence. Octopus's Dream was originally sung in Korean by singer-songwriter Ahn Ye-eun and first appeared on her third album, "OOO".

In addition to her screen presence, she also creates cartoons, comics, and related materials; writes novels, fiction, and scholarly articles (mostly in English); and produces music and choreography. She occasionally does translation and interpretation work as well.

=== 2022–2024: Blackforce ===
NistA and NistY were revealed as 3rd generation members of a Thai girl group, Blackforce, on November 11, 2022.

While part of Blackforce, she took part in several prominent events, including Japan Expo Thailand (the largest all-Japan event in Asia), the Thai-Japan Iconic Music Fest (the biggest Thai-Japan music festival in Thailand), and the Bilibili Anime Carnival 2023.

She additionally received invitations to numerous press screenings organized by major Thai film production and distribution companies, including Sahamongkol Film, along with Thai anime licensing companies such as DEX.

=== 2024–present: PRINCESS KILL ===
Before joining Blackforce, she was already active in the entertainment, music, and publishing industries. Following the group’s April 2024 disbandment, she and her twin continued as a duo under their original name, "Princess Kill".

== Awards ==
- Clean and Clear Idol Year 3 (2010) and Year 4 (2011), alongside NistY (her twin), Frung Narikun and Pang Mitchai (daughter of Thai Luk thung singer and Likay actor Chaiya Mitchai).
- KPN Music Competition 2012 (finalists).
