= Stamford College =

Stamford College may refer to:

- Stamford College, Lincolnshire further education college in Stamford, Lincolnshire
- Stamford College, Texas (1907–1918) former college in Stamford, Texas
- Stamford College, Petaling Jaya, Malaysia
- Stamford International College in Thailand, originally founded by Stamford College, Malaysia

== See also ==
- Stamford University (disambiguation)
