= Dandivine =

Japanese anime television series

- Key visual

獣王武神ダンデヴァイン (Jyuō Mujin Dandevuain)
- Genre: Mecha; Science fiction
- Created by: Good Smile Company; Liden Films
- Manga

Dandivine Kai
- Illustrated by: Toguchi
- Published by: ASCII Media Works
- Magazine: Dengeki Daioh
- Original run: September 26, 2026 – present
- Anime television series
- Directed by: Yi Cao
- Written by: Toshiki Inoue
- Music by: Kent Asahina
- Studio: Liden Films; Kayac Animation
- Licensed by: Crunchyroll: SEA: Muse Communication
- Original network: Tokyo MX, BS11, GTV, GYT, Chukyo TV, MBS
- Original run: October 8, 2026 – present
- Episodes: 4

Dandivine (Japanese: 獣王武神ダンデヴァイン, Hepburn: Jyuō Mujin Dandevuain; lit. "Beast King War God Dandivine") is an original Japanese anime television series created by Good Smile Company and Liden Films, and the first project in Good Smile Company's "The God of Combined Series" ("Gattaishin Series"), to commemorate its 25th anniversary. Produced by Liden Films and Kayac Animation, the series premiered in October 2026. A manga adaptation illustrated by Toguchi titled Dandivine Kai began serialization in ASCII Media Works' Dengeki Daioh magazine in September 2026.

== Plot ==
Twenty years after the robot Dandivine defeated the mysterious Aposdoll, the world is now at peace. However, toy manufacturer Kasuga, which relied on its Dandivine merchandise, has declined. Thus, Kasuga's president Genjuro Shijima prayed for Dandivine's revival, and the Aposdoll suddenly returned. High school student Gekiha Shijima gets an invitation from his uncle Yusaku Kuroiwa, the former main pilot of Dandivine, to pilot the giant robot himself.

== Characters ==
Gekiha Shijima (静寂戟刃, Shijima Gekiha)
Voiced by: Takuma Terashima
Akane Kuzumi (久住茜, Kuzumi Akane)
Voiced by: Haruka Shiraishi
Kirei Shijima (静寂きれい, Shijima Kirei)
Voiced by: Saya Aizawa
Haru (ハル)
Voiced by: Nao Tōyama
Natsu (ナツ)
Voiced by: Aya Yamane
Aki (アキ)
Voiced by: Misaki Kuno
Gō Sera (世良濠, Sera Gō)
Voiced by: Asuna Tomari
Yūsaku Kuroiwa (黒岩勇作, Kuroiwa Yūsaku)
Voiced by: Katsuyuki Konishi
Daigo Shijima (静寂醍醐, Shijima Daigo)
Voiced by: Ryōtarō Okiayu
Genjūrō Shijima (静寂弦十郎, Shijima Genjūrō)
Voiced by: Atsushi Ono
Yūga Shinonome (東雲優雅, Shinonome Yūga)
Voiced by: Ruriko Aoki

== Media ==
=== Manga ===
A manga adaptation illustrated by Toguchi, titled Dandivine Kai (獣王武神ダンデヴァイン戒, Jyuō Mujin Dandevuain Kai), began serialization in ASCII Media Works' Dengeki Daioh magazine on September 26, 2026.

=== Anime ===
The original anime television series was announced on June 3, 2026, as part of Good Smile Company's 25th anniversary. Produced by Liden Films and Kayac Animation, it is directed by Yi Cao and written by Toshiki Inoue, with robin designing the characters based on Majiro's original designs and Kento Asahina composing the music. The series premiered on October 8, 2026, on Tokyo MX and other networks. The opening theme song is "Zankyō ≠ Blaster" (残響≠ブラスター) performed by Takanori Nishikawa, and the ending theme song is "Mikansei Ordinary" (ミカンセイオーディナリー) performed by DayRe:. Crunchyroll will stream the series. Muse Communication licensed the series in Southeast Asia.
