= Krit Srifa =

Thai politician

Krit Srifa (born 23 April 1961) is a Thai politician. He is a member of parliament for the Thai Rak Thai Party. He graduated with a Bachelor of Political Science degree from the Ramkhamhaeng University. Krit first entered politics as an MP with the Thai Rak Thai Party in 2004. He won Jurin Laksanawisit from Democrat Party.
