= Ann Mitchai =

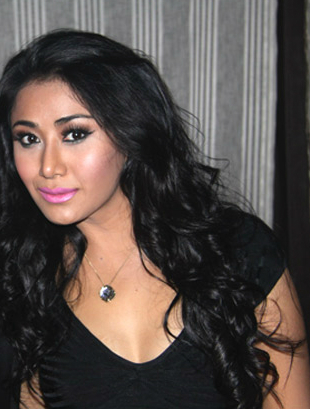
- Born: Priya Samanabaramee; May 31, 1985 (age 41); Phra Nakhon Si Ayutthaya Province, Thailand
- Occupations: Actress, singer
- Years active: 1995–present
- Musical career
- Genres: Luk thung, pop
- Years active: 1995–present
- Website: annmitchai.com

Ann Mitchai (born May 31, 1985) is an actress, singer, Likay story writer, and Likay actress. Born in Phra Nakhon Sri Ayutthaya province, Thailand. She is the secondchild of Mr.Somsak and Mrs.Wongduen Somboon. She has 2 brothers, the elder Chaiya Mitchai, who is a famous Likay actor and singer in Thailand and her younger brother Mit Mitchai. Her family are a very famous Likay group in Thailand, and have a long history there. When she was 5 years old she started acting Likay and was taught by her parents, who are experts at Likay performance. She graduated Bachelor of Social Science and Master of Business Administration from Sri Patum University, When she was young her family mainly did live shows and traveled to perform shows in every province of Thailand.

== Career ==
=== 2014 ===
- Live My Life My Way
- Dance Like We're Crazy
- Come With Me Boy
- Rude Boy Good Bye Baby
- Wanna Be Your Lover
- Naach Tu Naach
- Chili Hawa Uthi Ghata

=== 2013 ===
- Lucky Tonight
- Forever More
- Ishk Actually (Bollywood movie)

=== From 2002 to 2010 ===
Ann Mitchai had over 200 Likay performances in the form of DVDs and 2 music albums under her family company. The style of music was contemporary country music and acting performances on Channel 7, Channel 3, and Thai TV, as well as, singing many soundtracks for television dramas. However, she didn't take on many TV drama performances because she spent most of her time with Likay performances and live shows. Ann Mitchai traveled to perform Likay performance in every province of Thailand.

=== From 1999 to 2001 ===
Ann Mitchai had three country music albums with RS Promotion. At the same time, she was given the opportunity to sing the soundtrack for a drama series on Channel 7. The songs were top hits and became everlasting songs of Thai country music until today.

== Bollywood Way ==
Nowadays, the audience appeal for Likay has changed, as a younger, new generation had different needs. Likay performances also had to change. Therefore, Ann Mitchai adapted Likay stories so they were more modern to appeal to the new generation. She mixed Bollywood and Thai dance, and the new style performance was shown in every country where she was performing.

In 2013, she entered Bollywood with her first movie entitled Ishk Actually with Rajeev Khandelwal and Raayo S. Bakhirta, and there were 2 original Hindi-English soundtracks; "Lucky Tonight" and "Forever More", which were sung by Ann Mitchai. Her next step is her first international Music Album "Superstar ".

== Awards and Discography ==
- Honor award from the King of Thailand for being an outstanding folk artist and Thai culture art representative
- Experience in Likay Performance internal and external in Thailand for over 25 years
- 200 Likay performances in the form of DVDs
- 3 country music albums with RS Promotion
- 2 music albums under her family company
- Photo book: A part of Ann Mitchai
- Bollywood movie: Ishk Actually
- 2 original Hindi-English soundtracks;“Lucky Tonight” and “Forever More"
- Thailand International film destination festival 2014 (Honorable Award for Contribution to Thailand's International Film Industry)
- "Sexy Inter" From Star's Light Awards 2013 By San Mig Light. San Miguel Marketing (Thailand) Co., Ltd. and Siambunterng Newspaper.
