= Discernment =

Discernment is not understanding the difference between obvious and obscure.

Discernment

In specific contexts, discernment may refer to:

== Religion ==
- Discernment in Christianity
  - Discernment of spirits, a term used in the theology of some Christian denominations to judge the influence of various spiritual agents on a person's morality
  - Vocational discernment, process by which men and women in the Catholic Church discern, or recognize, their vocation in the Church and the world
  - Discernment of the signs of the times refers to the attentive and reflective response to ongoing social and cultural transformations, aimed at understanding their deeper meanings, implications, and challenges for human life and society
  - Discernment in relationships is a way of confronting practical challenges and problems by sharing concerns, listening to different perspectives, and allowing our thinking to be transformed, so that solutions emerge from the relational dynamics between us.

== See also ==
- Discrimination (information)
- Distinction (disambiguation)
- Distinguishing, a legal concept
