= Muse Communication =

Taiwanese anime licensing company

Muse Communication Co., Ltd.
- Type: Joint-stock
- Industry: Entertainment
- Genre: Japanese animation
- Predecessor: Muse Cultural Enterprise Co., Ltd.
- Founded: 1992; 34 years ago
- Headquarters: Xinzhuang District, New Taipei, Taiwan
- Area served: Southeast Asia, South Asia, East Asia, Mainland China, Taiwan, Hong Kong, and Macau
- Key people: Jimmy Tandel (chairman); Gary Yang (vice president); Wang Yina (marketing manager)
- Products: Anime, Animation, motion pictures, merchandise, Asian, American and European cinema
- Subsidiaries: Fukang Enterprise; Eagle International Communication; Muse Communication (H.K.); Muse Animation (Shanghai); Muse Communication (Kuala Lumpur) Sdn. Bhd.
- Website: e-muse.com

Muse Communication Co., Ltd. (also known simply as Muse) is a Taiwanese distributor and licensor that specializes in the distribution of anime. Based in Xinzhuang District, New Taipei City, the company also distributes Asian and European films in Taiwan. It has licenses for several popular anime series and tokusatsu such as Fairy Tail: 100 Years Quest, Attack on Titan, Sword Art Online, Demon Slayer: Kimetsu no Yaiba, JoJo's Bizarre Adventure, One-Punch Man, Re:Zero, Spy × Family, Saint Seiya, Hunter × Hunter, Pretty Cure Series, Kamen Rider Series, Super Sentai, and many more.

== History ==
Muse Communication traces its origins to May 1987, when Muse Cultural Enterprise Co., Ltd. was established in Taiwan. Muse Communication Co., Ltd. was subsequently established in September 1992. Fukang Enterprise Co., Ltd. was established in May 1989 as the predecessor of the company's merchandise distribution business.

MUSE launched Muse Asia, a YouTube channel which provides anime with English and Chinese subtitles for audiences in parts of Southeast Asia, East Asia and South Asia. As of 9 April 2024, the channel has more than 8.6 million subscribers and amassed over 2.9 billion views. The company has since launched localized YouTube channels for audiences in Indonesia, Malaysia, Philippines, Thailand, Vietnam and India.

Muse Communication (Hong Kong) was founded in November 1997. Muse Animation (Shanghai) was founded in January 2013. On August 7, 2018, Muse Communications began marketing select titles from their library on YouTube in Taiwan.

Muse Communication (Kuala Lumpur) Sdn. Bhd.
- Type: Private Limited
- Industry: Entertainment
- Genre: Anime
- Founded: April 18, 2025; 18 months ago
- Headquarters: Taiwan
- Key people: Lam Yee Shiuh (Managing Director)
- Products: Anime distribution, merchandising, self-media operations, IP licensing
- Services: Anime Merchandise Distribution, Anime and Movie Distribution, IP Licensing and Marketing
- Owner: Muse Communication Co., Ltd.
- Divisions: Merchandise Distribution, Anime and Movie distribution, IP Licensing and Marketing
- Website: e-muse.com/en

Muse Communication (Kuala Lumpur) Sdn. Bhd. (also known as Muse KL) was incorporated in Malaysia on 18 April 2025, serving Singapore, Brunei, and Cambodia. Alongside Muse Taiwan and other regional offices, MUSE KL provides a range of services including distribution, merchandising, self-media operations, and IP licensing.

== Distribution ==
=== Physical distribution ===
Muse does not directly release its titles on home video outside of Taiwan but instead sub-licenses to other companies such as Dream Express (DEX), and previously Rose Media and Entertainment for the Thai market.

=== Digital and television distribution ===
Muse sub-licenses select titles to OTT platforms and TV stations in other served regions. Notable platforms include Netflix, Disney+, iQIYI, CATCHPLAY+, Bilibili, Viu, Tencent Video/WeTV, iflix, JioCinema, Youku, Vision+, HBO Max, CubMu, Sushiroll, Vidio, iWant and many more.

=== YouTube distribution ===
On 7 August 2018, Muse began distributing full episodes of anime series on YouTube, initially in Taiwan, as part of its efforts to combat piracy. In July 2019, Muse launched Muse Asia, a legal anime streaming service on YouTube operated by its Singapore branch. The channel initially offered selected Spring and Summer 2019 anime titles for free in 14 territories across South and Southeast Asia, with English and Chinese subtitles. Episodes were uploaded within the same week as their Japanese television broadcast.

In 2020, Muse expanded its YouTube distribution through regional channels offering anime with localized subtitles. Muse Malaysia and Muse Vietnam were announced in February 2020, with uploads scheduled to begin on 1 March of that year. Muse Indonesia followed in September 2020, initially offering anime with Indonesian subtitles.

Muse subsequently established additional regional YouTube channels, including Muse Philippines, Muse Thailand and Muse India. Its channels distribute licensed anime with subtitles and, in some markets, dubbed versions. The company's official website lists its regional YouTube channels as part of its social-media network.

== Regional coverage ==
Muse Communication's distribution network covers multiple markets across Asia, with the availability of titles varying by territory, platform and individual licensing agreements. The company distributes anime through its regional YouTube channels and third-party television and streaming services.

Distribution channel	Regions covered
YouTube	Taiwan, Hong Kong, Macau, Singapore, Malaysia, Brunei, Thailand, Vietnam, Indonesia, the Philippines, India, Myanmar, Bangladesh, Bhutan, Cambodia, Laos, Nepal and Pakistan. Muse operates additional country-specific channels, including Muse Asia, Muse Malaysia, Muse Indonesia, Muse Philippines, Muse Thailand, Muse Vietnam and Muse India.
Television	Various Asian markets through regional television broadcasters and distribution partners. Specific broadcast territories vary by title and licensing agreement.
OTT and digital streaming	Various markets across Asia, including territories served by Netflix, Disney+, iQIYI, CATCHPLAY+, Bilibili, Viu and other regional streaming services. Availability varies by title and platform.

== Notable titles distributed by Muse ==
=== Anime series ===
- 86
- The 100 Girlfriends Who Really, Really, Really, Really, Really Love You
- A Certain Magical Index
- A Certain Scientific Accelerator
- Aikatsu Planet!
- Anohana: The Flower We Saw That Day
- Assassination Classroom
- Attack on Titan
- BanG Dream!
  - BanG Dream! Ave Mujica
  - BanG Dream! It's MyGO!!!!!
  - BanG Dream! Yume∞Mita
- Black Butler
- Classroom of the Elite
- Dandadan
- Daemons of the Shadow Realm
- Demon Slayer: Kimetsu no Yaiba
- Fairy Tail
  - Fairy Tail: 100 Years Quest
- Frieren: Beyond Journey's End
- Goblin Slayer
- Golden Kamuy
- Gurren Lagann
- Heaven's Design Team
- Hunter × Hunter
- Hyouka
- Insomniacs After School
- Is It Wrong to Try to Pick Up Girls in a Dungeon?
- Is the Order a Rabbit?
- JoJo's Bizarre Adventure
- Kaguya-sama: Love Is War
- Love Live!
- Made in Abyss
- Mob Psycho 100
- Moriarty the Patriot
- Mushoku Tensei: Jobless Reincarnation
- My Dress-Up Darling
- Noblesse
- One-Punch Man
- Pretty Cure Series
- Puella Magi Madoka Magica
- Rascal Does Not Dream of Bunny Girl Senpai
- Rent-A-Girlfriend
- Re:Zero − Starting Life in Another World
- Spy × Family
- Sword Art Online
- That Time I Got Reincarnated as a Slime (including the fourth season's first two cours)
- That Time I Got Reincarnated as a Slime the Movie: Scarlet Bond
- Tokyo Revengers (first season only)
- Wandering Witch: The Journey of Elaina
- The Elusive Samurai
- Firefly Wedding
- Playing Death Games to Put Food on the Table
- The Other World's Books Depend on the Bean Counter
- Reincarnated as a Dragon Hatchling
- Chained Soldier
- Skeleton Knight in Another World
- The World's Finest Assassin Gets Reincarnated in Another World as an Aristocrat
- Parallel World Pharmacy

=== Tokusatsu series ===
- Kamen Rider
- Super Sentai
