= Stamford University =

Stamford University may refer to:

== Asia ==
- Stamford University (Bangladesh)
- Stamford International University (Thailand)

== Europe ==
- University of Stamford, Lincolnshire, England, founded by University of Oxford rebels in 1333

== North America ==
- The Stamford campus of the University of Connecticut

== See also ==
- Stamford College (disambiguation)
- Samford University, in Homewood, Alabama
- Stanford University, in Stanford, California
