= Phu Chana Sip Thit =

1932 novel by Chote Praepan

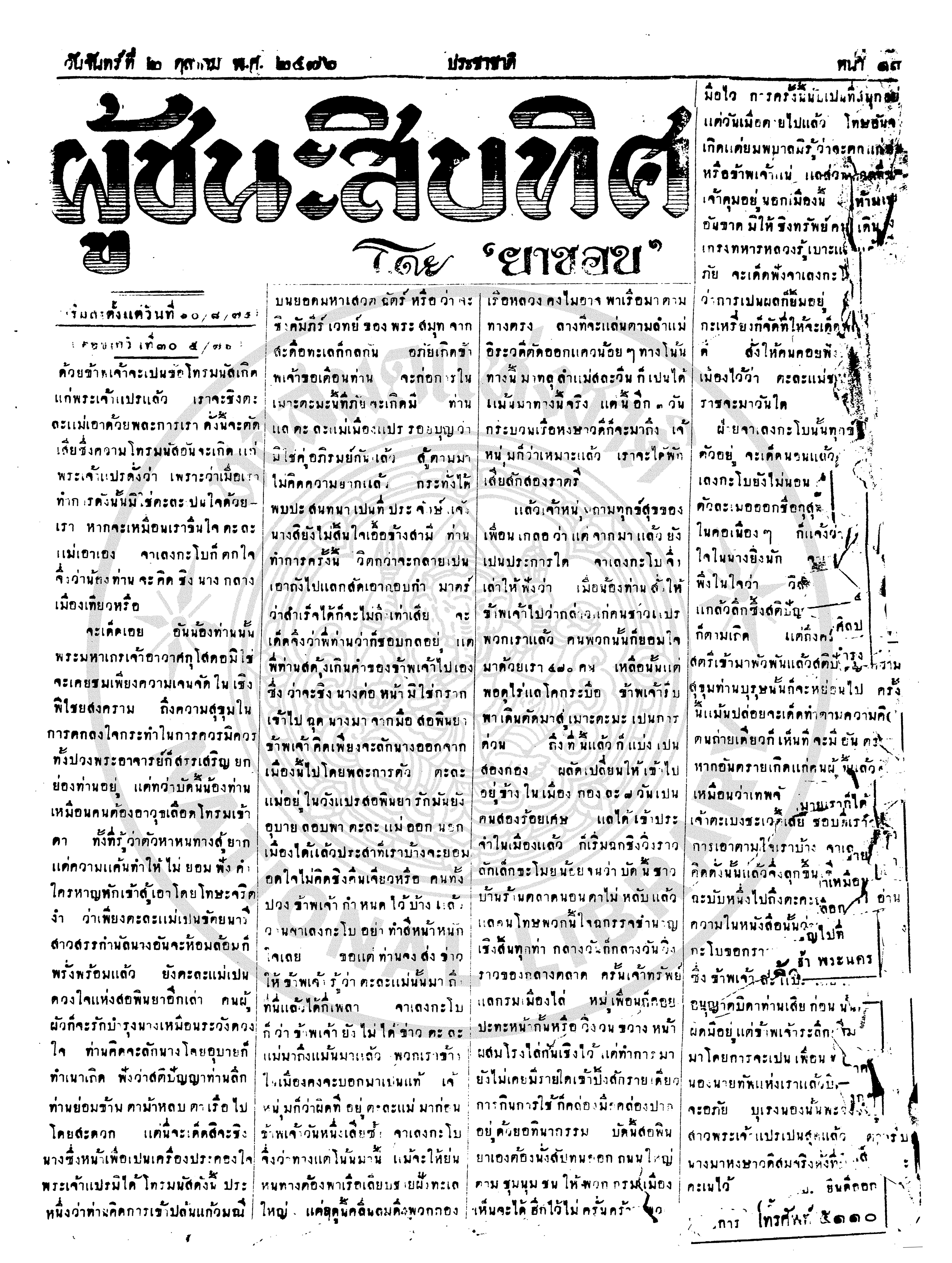
- The novel Phu Chana Sip Thit was first serialized in the Prachachat newspaper, beginning with the issue dated October 2, 1933.
- Author: Chote Praepan
- Original title: ผู้ชนะสิบทิศ
- Language: Thai
- Set in: Toungoo dynasty
- Publication date: 1932
- Publication place: Thailand
- ISBN: 9748358186
- OCLC: 37905545

Phu Chana Sip Thit (Thai: ผู้ชนะสิบทิศ; "Conqueror of the Ten Directions") is a Thai historical novel written by Chote Praepan. The novel depicts the romanticized life of Bayinnaung, a pre-eminent Burmese monarch responsible for establishing the First Toungoo Empire, the largest empire in Southeast Asian history.

Since its publication in 1932, Phu Chana Sip Thit has been adapted into numerous stage plays, television dramas, radio dramas, and an eponymous song in mainstream Thai culture, which has reinforced the novel's enduring popularity, as well as Bayinnaung's stature within Thai society.

The novel is an eight volume work, and is one of the longest historical novels in Southeast Asia, and known for its high literary standard and plotline.

== Title ==
The Thai language title Phu Chana Sip Thit literally means "Conqueror of the Ten Directions"—referring to the four cardinal points, the four intermediate points, and the vertical axis of zenith and nadir. The epithet is derived from Slapat Rajawan, a Mon language chronicle, written by a monastery abbot in the 1760s.

== Adaptations ==
Phu Chana Sip Thit has been adapted into numerous stage plays, radio and television dramas, and films over the years.

=== Films ===
Between 1966 and 1967, the novel was adapted into a film trilogy, directed by Thian Karnasuta (เฑียรร์ กรรณสูต).

=== Television ===
The novel has been adapted as a television drama numerous times, including in 1958, 1961, 1971, 1980, 1983, 1989, and most recently, 2013.

=== Radio ===
The novel has also been adapted as a Thai radio drama on a literary program aired between 1987 and 1997, in 2011, and in 2012.

=== Music ===
Phu Chana Sip Thit was adapted into an eponymous song by Charin Nantanakorn, a popular Thai singer from the 1960s and 1970s.

== Cast ==
Television

Years	1958	1961	1971	1976 1980 (Rerun)	1983	1989-90	2013-14
Channels	Channel 4	Channel 4	Channel 4	Channel 9	Channel 5	Channel 3	Channel 8
Making companies				Kanokwan Dan-udom		Kanokwan Dan-udom	Srikhumrung Production Co., Ltd.
Screenplay						Rapeeporn; Worakorn; Piyada	Viroj Srisitsereeamorn
Directors				Tat Akatat		Pisan Akaraseranee	Khunakorn Setthee
Characters	Main cast						
Jadad / Mangchangai / Burengnongkayodinnoratha / Payinnaw	Prakob Chaipipat	Charin Nantanakorn	Asawin Rattanapracha	Nirut Sirijanya	Somchart Prachatai	Santisuk Promsiri	Rattapoom Toekongsap
Mangtra / Tabengchawety / Tapinchawety				Pisan Akaraseranee	Asawin Rattanapracha	Tripob Limpapat	Jira Danbawornkiat
Talamaejantra	Daret Satajan		Sasima Singsiri	Nantawan Mekyai	Duangjai Hathaikarn	Nattaya Dangbunga	Prisana Kumpusiri
Talamaekusuma	Songsri Tevakub	Sawalee Pakaphan	Thiwaporn Kanjanarom	Kanokwan Dan-udom	Pimjai Pommalee	Sinjai Plengpanich	Vanessa Herrmann
Sor-Pinya				Suprawat Pattamasoot		Santi Santiwetchakun	Parahma Im-Anothai
Kantima / Nakatachebo				Khompat Attaya		Thanya Wachirabunjong	Napapat Wattanakamolwut
Princess Nantawadee				Peeranuch Sirisoui		Arada Srisoikaew	Morakot Hathaiwasiwong
Princess Cho-Aw				Sumalee Chanpoomdon			Pimolrat Pisolyabutr
Princess A-Tetya				Kannika Thammakesorn		Vannisa Sriwichian	Kullamas Limpawutivaranon
Characters	Supporting cast						
Kai-Loo				Somjin Thammatat		Janaprakal Chandruang	Sorapong Chatree
Mangsinthoo						Pathomchai Chomsrimek	Sompob Benjathikul
Mae Laochee				Somjit Supsamruay		Juree Osiri	Naruemon Phongsuphap
Takayee				Siripong Isarangkoon Na Ayutthaya			Akekaphan Bunluerit
King Norabodee / King of Pyay				Tat Akatat			Klot Atthaseri
Princess of Pyay				Marasri Isarangkoon Na Ayutthaya			Pimpaka Siangsomboon
Rhanong				Somkuan Krajangsas		Adisak Sawetnan	Suchao Pongwilai
Saming Sor-Tud							Chalad Na Songkhla
Takayor-Din							Sommart Praihirun
Pakanwunyee				Muangraerng Pattamin			Praptpadol Suwanbang
Jalengkabo				Witoon Karuna			Rachawat Klipngern
See Aong				Sompong Pongmit			Kirati Thepthan
Nengbha				Adinan Singhiran		Kasama Nissaipan	Wisawa Dabbaransi
Tongwunyee				Wong Srisawas			Jirasak Thanaworapong
Jeesabeng				Soosak Thiantham			Perawatch Herabutya
King Sohanpawha				Prakob Arunsaeng			Peter Maiocchi
Por-Ra Tiang				Rapeepan Premratsamee			Thichacha Boonruangkhao
Seng Sor-Boo				Sukanya Nakson			Jittamas Kupjit
Muk Eye				Deuntem Salitul			Kitlapat Korasudraiwon
Tongsa				Or-rasa Isarangkoon Na Ayutthaya			Paweena Thansrisuroj
							Khemmachart Rojana-Hassadin
Siangkonsukayee				Sriempan Suttinet			Watcharachai Sunthornsiri
King Takayutpi				Gumthorn Suwanpiyasiri			Thanayong Wongtrakul
Princess Min Boo							Candy Avery
							John Bravo
							Songkrt Meechaiyo
							Somchart Prachatai
							Nitiroj Simakamthorn
							Polkrit Jaksuwan
							Parinda Phinitchana
Characters	Cameo						
Mengkayinyo / Princess Sirichaisura							Ron Banjongsang
Her Royal Highness						Ampraka Wongnamon	Daran Thitakawin
Pai Fayoo							Prasat Thong-Aram
Characters	Supporting cast						
							Emil Farah Abdallah Zaghmut
							Muller Julein
							Prasit Roswan
							Kiatkhajorn Tuamdee
Jadad (Young)							Pasawee Wasu-anankul
Mangtra (Young)							Nuttapon Thamniyom
Talamaejantra (Young)							Pichaporn Kulmongkol
Bodyguard Rhanong							Phayab Pimsen
Bodyguard Rhanong							Amnuay Wanjan
Bodyguard Rhanong							Naratip Naknaka
Bodyguard Rhanong							Chatchai Hongsangam

== Original soundtracks ==
Year	Song name	Petition	Melody	Compose	Sing
1958	Phu Chana Sip Thit	Salai Kaileit	Salai Kaileit	-	-
1961	Phu Chana Sip Thit	Salai Kaileit	Salai Kaileit	-	Charin Nantanakorn
1971	Phu Chana Sip Thit	Salai Kaileit	Salai Kaileit	-	Charin Nantanakorn
1980	Phu Chana Sip Thit	Salai Kaileit	Salai Kaileit	-	Charin Nantanakorn
1983	Phu Chana Sip Thit	Salai Kaileit	Salai Kaileit	-	Yuenyong Opakul
1989-90	Phu Chana Sip Thit	Chairat Wongkiatkhajorn	Chairat Wongkiatkhajorn	Wirach U-Thaworn	Arthur Panyachote
2013-14	Chai Cha Na Ni Pen Khong Thoe	Sutthiphong Sombatjinda	Vuttichai Sombatjinda	Anucha Atjanawat	Nattapon Wongsanit
2013-14	หัวใจให้แผ่นดิน...วิญญาณให้ความรัก	Sutthiphong Sombatjinda	Vuttichai Sombatjinda	Anucha Atjanawat	Nattapon Wongsanit
2013-14	Mai Mi Wan Plian Chai	Sutthiphong Sombatjinda	Vuttichai Sombatjinda	Anucha Atjanawat	Keng (Infamous)
