= Heaven's Design Team =

Manga and anime series

- First tankōbon volume cover

天地創造デザイン部 (Tenchi Sōzō Dezain-bu)
- Genre: Comedy; Educational
- Manga
- Written by: Hebi-zou; Tsuta Suzuki
- Illustrated by: Tarako
- Published by: Kodansha
- English publisher: NA: Kodansha USA
- Magazine: Morning Two
- Original run: February 22, 2017 – present
- Volumes: 9
- Anime television series
- Directed by: Sōichi Masui
- Written by: Michiko Yokote
- Music by: Hayato Matsuo
- Studio: Asahi Production
- Licensed by: Crunchyroll: SA/SEA: Muse Communication
- Original network: AT-X, Tokyo MX, MBS, TV Aichi, BS Fuji
- Original run: January 7, 2021 – March 25, 2021
- Episodes: 12 + special
- icon

Heaven's Design Team (Japanese: 天地創造デザイン部, Hepburn: Tenchi Sōzō Dezain-bu) is a Japanese manga series, written by Hebi-zou and Tsuta Suzuki and illustrated by Tarako. It has been serialized in Kodansha's seinen manga magazine Morning Two since February 2017, with its chapters collected in nine tankōbon volumes as of December 2025. The manga is licensed in North America by Kodansha USA. An anime television series adaptation produced by Asahi Production aired from January to March 2021.

== Plot ==
Kami-sama ("God", in English) created the Earth and filled the world with natural resources. Though God originally was going to create the animals that would inhabit the world, the task was outsourced to a team of creative minds. God generally sends tasks to the team to fulfill ideas for an animal with unique and quirky features based on vague descriptions or design goals. Designs that he approves become animals while rejected ones go back to the designer to revise until he is satisfied. Other times, the team can freely create a new design on their own whims and preferences in aesthetic and physical designs. One of God's angels, Shimoda, is tasked with overseeing the crew and sending potential new animals for God's approval.

The series serves to illustrate biology of real life animals and their characteristics as well as explaining some biological issues regarding mythical animals, all this while showing the concepts of design thinking, such as testing and prototyping.

== Characters ==
Shimoda (下田)
Voiced by: Junya Enoki
Shimoda is a rookie angel assigned by God to oversee the design team and serves as the communication point between the design team and God. The design team submit papers containing details and illustrations of their potential animals to Shimoda in a notebook that he carries. God then sends him a direct telepathic message with his decision if the animal is approved or rejected. Though his appearance and personality is that of a full-grown adult, Shimoda is a relatively newly created angel and is noted to have terrible handwriting. He is also a skilled baker and occasionally bakes pastries for the design team.
Ueda (上田)
Voiced by: Yumi Hara
Ueda is a fellow angel and is Shimoda's supervisor. Like Shimoda, she sometimes serves as a communication point between the design team and God for the results of animals that are approved. She is also the supervisor of the various other departments such as the insect department.
God, the Creator (神様, Kami-sama)
Voiced by: Naoki Tatsuta
Kami-sama (God, in English) is the unseen deity of the series who approves of the animal designs submitted by the team. God designates criteria for the design team to fulfill when making requests, leaving them to ponder how to tackle them. These are usually vague descriptions and are left to the design team to interpret and design an animal. Using either Shimoda or Ueda, he receives the tentative animal designs and relays back to them telepathically if they have been approved or rejected. Other times it seems that he can oversee the design team's design process and immediately approve of a design without a submission.

=== Design Team ===
Tsuchiya (土屋) / Saturn
Voiced by: Kazuhiko Inoue
Tsuchiya is the chief of the design team, and he is perpetually obsessed with horses, his greatest masterpiece. He often tries to insert his horse design into the various design requests that God sends, though despite the modifications to the horse design that they submit, they are often rejected such as the Pegasus and Unicorn due to biological complications. Despite his insistence, his team remains supportive of him and encourages him to push forward, even though the final designs are often un-horse like in the end.
Kimura (木村) / Jupiter
Voiced by: Yūichirō Umehara
Kimura is the most carefree of the team and rarely gets into arguments with his fellow team members. His is a foodie by nature and a vast majority of his designs are meant to be eaten. He also does not hesitate to sneak a taste of his fellow team members' animals, even if they are poisonous, just to find out if they are tasty. He also enjoys acting like a detective on occasion whenever a mystery is afoot in the department. His greatest masterpiece is the cow.
Mizushima (水島) / Mercury
Voiced by: Junichi Suwabe
Mizushima is an aloof and somewhat stoic member of the team. Unlike most of his teammates, he does not have a particular quirk in designing his animals aside from making them as efficiently designed as possible. Besides Higuchi, Mizushima is usually the one to point out issues with his teammates' designs. His greatest masterpieces are snakes, which he is particularly passionate in defending, usually resulting in him conflicting with Kanamori whose bird designs are often preyed upon by his snakes.
Kanamori (金森) / Venus
Voiced by: Daisuke Kishio
Kanamori is a fashonista with an eye for beauty and style, the basis for her designs. Most of her designs are birds since she is the one who designed the original bird model, her greatest masterpiece. She is the only member of the design team to regularly change attire. She has a tendency to be overly dramatic in most situations and hates to settle on her designs if they are not absolutely aesthetically beautiful in her opinion. She has a strong dislike of insects in general, but is more than willing to use the insect department's input to finish a design if absolutely necessary such as her hummingbird.
Meido (冥戸) / Pluto
Voiced by: Naomi Ōzora
Meido dresses in a punk-lolita fashion and has a deep obsession with creating morbid features into her design. Many of her creatures are poisonous, cannibalistic, and parasitic, all of which she considers to be cute. Her designs tend to have the widest range of appearances from a shark to a koala. Before the events of manga, she used to work in plant department but was transferred after designing a carnivorous plant. She carries an Anomalocarida shaped plush. Her greatest masterpieces are poisonous frogs.
Unabara (海原) / Neptune
Voiced by: Ryōta Takeuchi
Unabara is the tallest and biggest of the design team, but inversely the most gentle and sensitive of the crew. He has an eye for creating cute animals as noted by the stuffed rabbit doll that he regularly carries. His greatest masterpieces are the kangaroo and later the sea otter.
Higuchi (火口) / Mars
Voiced by: Asuna Tomari
Higuchi is the primary engineer of the design team and creates the drafts of the animals the team creates for testing. She is opinionated about the end designs and can identify most of the issues the drafts have. Her passion for creating the animals can be aggressive at times but is overall very friendly to the rest of the team. She also runs and maintains the Galápagos Islands, a simulation island meant to test out new submissions in the wild, of which she can freely change the Biome and manipulate the weather to fully test out the animals.

=== Other recurring characters ===
Yokota (横田)
Voiced by: Ryōta Ōsaka
A representative of Hell, Yokota is not a member of the design team, but in similar fashion to God, he tasks the design team with creating hellish creatures to inhabit the realm, namely for a Hell theme park in production. Before the events of manga he was an angel, and closely resembled Shimoda, except his hair was white. He speaks in a chūnibyō fashion.
Mushibu (虫部)
Voiced by: Takahiro Mizushima
Mushibu is a side department dedicated to designing insects, though the design team sometimes come to them for inspiration when creating features of their animals. There are seven members of the team, but they all share the same appearance aside from different colored shirts. They also occasionally talk in unison.
Kenta Tsuchiya (土屋 ケンタ, Tsuchiya Kenta)
Voiced by: Hina Kino
Kenta is Tsuchiya's grandson who visits the heaven's design team on occasion. His childish drawings sometimes becomes an approved animal. Like his grandfather, he loves horses.

== Media ==
=== Manga ===
Heaven's Design Team is written by Hebi-zou and Tsuta Suzuki and illustrated by Tarako. The series began in Kodansha's seinen manga magazine Morning Two on February 22, 2017. The magazine ceased print publication and moved to a digital release starting on August 4, 2022. Kodansha has collected its chapters into individual tankōbon volumes. The first volume was released on November 22, 2017. As of December 23, 2025, nine volumes have been released.

In North America, Kodansha USA announced the English digital release of the series in April 2018. Kodansha announced the print release of the series in November 2019, with the first volume released on October 20, 2020.

==== Volumes ====
No.	Original release date	Original ISBN	English release date	English ISBN
1	November 22, 2017	978-4-06-510461-3	May 8, 2018 (digital); October 20, 2020 (physical)	978-1-64-651113-6
2	June 22, 2018	978-4-06-511712-5	October 30, 2018 (digital); December 8, 2020 (physical)	978-1-64-651129-7
3	January 23, 2019	978-4-06-514673-6	June 18, 2019 (digital); February 23, 2021 (physical)	978-1-64-651130-3
4	August 23, 2019	978-4-06-516885-1	December 24, 2019 (digital); March 30, 2021 (physical)	978-1-64-651131-0
5	April 23, 2020	978-4-06-510461-3	September 29, 2020 (digital); July 13, 2021 (physical)	978-1-64-651154-9
6	January 21, 2021	978-4-06-521855-6	June 29, 2021 (digital); September 21, 2021 (physical)	978-1-64-651268-3
7	October 21, 2021	978-4-06-524640-5	July 19, 2022	978-1-64-651354-3
8	July 22, 2022	978-1-68-491921-5	February 28, 2023	978-1-64-651440-3
9	December 23, 2025	978-4-06-541681-5	—	—

=== Anime ===
An anime television series adaptation was announced in April 2020. The series is directed by Sōichi Masui at Asahi Production, with series composition handled by Michiko Yokote, character designs by Sachiko Oohashi, and music composed by Hayato Matsuo. It aired from January 7 to March 25, 2021, on AT-X and other channels. A special was released on April 2, 2021. The opening theme song is "Give It Up？" performed by "96Neko" (96猫, "Kuro Neko"), and the ending theme song is "DESIGNED BY HEAVEN！" performed by "Paraiso☆Employee Stars" (パライソ☆社員スターズ, "Paraiso☆Shain Sutāzu"). Crunchyroll streamed the series. Muse Communication has licensed the series in Southeast Asia and South Asia.

No.	Title	Directed by (Note: Information is taken from the ending credits of each episode.)	Written by	Original release date
1	"Idea 1"; Transliteration: "Anken Ichi" (Japanese: 案件１)	Takashi Kobayashi	Michiko Yokote	January 7, 2021
2	"Idea 2"; Transliteration: "Anken Ni" (Japanese: 案件２)	Yōsuke Nakanishi	Michiko Yokote	January 14, 2021
3	"Idea 3"; Transliteration: "Anken San" (Japanese: 案件３)	Kenta Noda	Michiko Yokote	January 21, 2021
4	"Idea 4"; Transliteration: "Anken Yon" (Japanese: 案件４)	Yasuo Ejima	Michiko Yokote	January 28, 2021
5	"Idea 5"; Transliteration: "Anken Go" (Japanese: 案件５)	Yōsuke Nakanishi	Michiko Yokote	February 4, 2021
6	"Idea 6"; Transliteration: "Anken Roku" (Japanese: 案件６)	Takashi Kobayashi	Michiko Yokote	February 11, 2021
7	"Idea 7"; Transliteration: "Anken Nana" (Japanese: 案件７)	Takahiro Ōtsuka	Michiko Yokote	February 18, 2021
8	"Idea 8"; Transliteration: "Anken Hachi" (Japanese: 案件８)	Yōsuke Nakanishi	Michiko Yokote	February 25, 2021
9	"Idea 9"; Transliteration: "Anken Kyū" (Japanese: 案件９)	Takashi Kobayashi	Michiko Yokote	March 4, 2021
10	"Idea 10"; Transliteration: "Anken Jū" (Japanese: 案件１０)	Yasuo Ejima	Michiko Yokote	March 11, 2021
11	"Idea 11"; Transliteration: "Anken Jūichi" (Japanese: 案件１１)	Yōsuke Nakanishi	Michiko Yokote	March 18, 2021
12	"Idea 12"; Transliteration: "Anken Jūni" (Japanese: 案件１２)	Takashi Kobayashi	Michiko Yokote	March 25, 2021
Special	"Special Edition"; Transliteration: "Tokubetsu-hen" (Japanese: 特別編)	Yasuo Ejima	Michiko Yokote	April 2, 2021

== Reception ==
The Encyclopedia of Science Fiction described Heaven's Design Team as a likeable, amusing and educational anime, praising its sympathetic cast of eccentric characters and its entertaining depiction of the challenges involved in designing animals. It particularly appreciated the series' relatively rigorous treatment of biology, highlighting its explanations of scientific principles such as the square–cube law and the biological limitations of invisibility. The encyclopedia also noted the show's humorous treatment of intelligent design and evolution, with competition between the designers sometimes resembling an evolutionary arms race. However, although it considered the characters' efforts to develop viable animal designs the series' strongest element, it found the surrounding narrative occasionally unmemorable.
