= Asuna Tomari =

Japanese voice actress

- 泊 明日菜
- Born: 20 March
- Occupation: Voice actor
- Years active: 2014–present
- Employer: Zynchro
- Notable work: That Time I Got Reincarnated as a Slime as Gobta; Heaven's Design Team as Higuchi; Don't Hurt Me, My Healer! as Mushroom; Smile of the Arsnotoria as Perdera; Delicious in Dungeon as Chilchuck Tims

Asuna Tomari (Japanese: 泊 明日菜, Hepburn: Tomari Asuna; born 20 March) is a Japanese voice actress from Ibaraki Prefecture, affiliated with Zynchro. She is known for starring as Gobta in That Time I Got Reincarnated as a Slime, Higuchi in Heaven's Design Team, Mushroom in Don't Hurt Me, My Healer!, Perdera in Smile of the Arsnotoria, and Chilchuck Tims in Delicious in Dungeon.

== Biography ==
Asuna Tomari, a native of Ibaraki Prefecture, was born on 20 March. She was educated at the Japan Narration Acting Institute and Nishogakusha University. She was previously affiliated with VIMS. In 2014, she started voicing characters in anime television series such as Riddle Story of Devil, Shimoneta, Just Because!, Symphogear AXZ, and The Idolmaster SideM.

In 2018, Tomari was cast as Taiga in Puzzle & Dragons and Gobta in That Time I Got Reincarnated as a Slime. In 2020, she starred as Higuchi in Heaven's Design Team. In 2022, she played Mushroom in Don't Hurt Me, My Healer!, Perdera in Smile of the Arsnotoria, and Neze Rankett in Is It Wrong to Try to Pick Up Girls in a Dungeon?. In 2024, she starred as Chilchuck Tims in Delicious in Dungeon.

Tomari holds a level 3 certification in secretarial proficiency and is a taidō shodan.

== Filmography ==
=== Animated television ===
Year	Title	Role(s)	Ref
2014	Riddle Story of Devil	Haru's brother	
2015	Shimoneta	Girl E	
2017	Elegant Yokai Apartment Life	Yūshi Inaba (young)	
2017	Just Because!	Bandmember B	
2017	Kino's Journey	Child C, child	
2017	Knight's & Magic	Child B	
2017	Magical Circle Guru Guru	Boy, doll	
2017	Symphogear AXZ	Stefan	
2017	The Idolmaster SideM	Child	
2018	A Place Further than the Universe	Schoolgirl	
2018	Dorei-ku The Animation	Ryūō Edogawa	
2018	Killing Bites	Takeshi Kido (young)	
2018	Ms. Vampire Who Lives in My Neighborhood	Schoolgirl B	
2018	Puzzle & Dragons	Taiga	
2018	Rokuhōdō Yotsuiro Biyori	Hiroshi Watanabe	
2018	The Ryuo's Work Is Never Done!	Child B	
2018	That Time I Got Reincarnated as a Slime	Gobta	
2019	Ahiru no Sora	Child	
2019	Dr. Stone	Chrome (young)	
2019	Fruits Basket	Kyo Soma	
2020	Mewkledreamy	Kyū-chan	
2021	Heaven's Design Team	Higuchi	
2021	86	Shiden Iida	
2022	Don't Hurt Me, My Healer!	Mushroom	
2022	Insect Land	Adam	
2022	Is It Wrong to Try to Pick Up Girls in a Dungeon?	Neze Rankett	
2022	Smile of the Arsnotoria	Perdera	
2024	Delicious in Dungeon	Chilchuck Tims	
2026	A Hundred Scenes of Awajima	Shizuka Utagawa	
2026	Dandivine	Gō Sera	

=== Video games ===
Year	Title	Role(s)	Ref
2016	Quiz RPG: The World of Mystic Wiz	Mitziola	
2023	Monster Strike	Merbisel	
