= Animethon =

Anime convention

- Logo since 2024
- Status: Active
- Venue: Edmonton Convention Centre
- Locations: Edmonton, Alberta
- Country: Canada
- Inaugurated: August 13, 1994; 32 years ago
- Attendance: 15,000+ (2025)
- Organizer: Alberta Society for Asian Popular Arts (ASAPA)
- Website: animethon.org

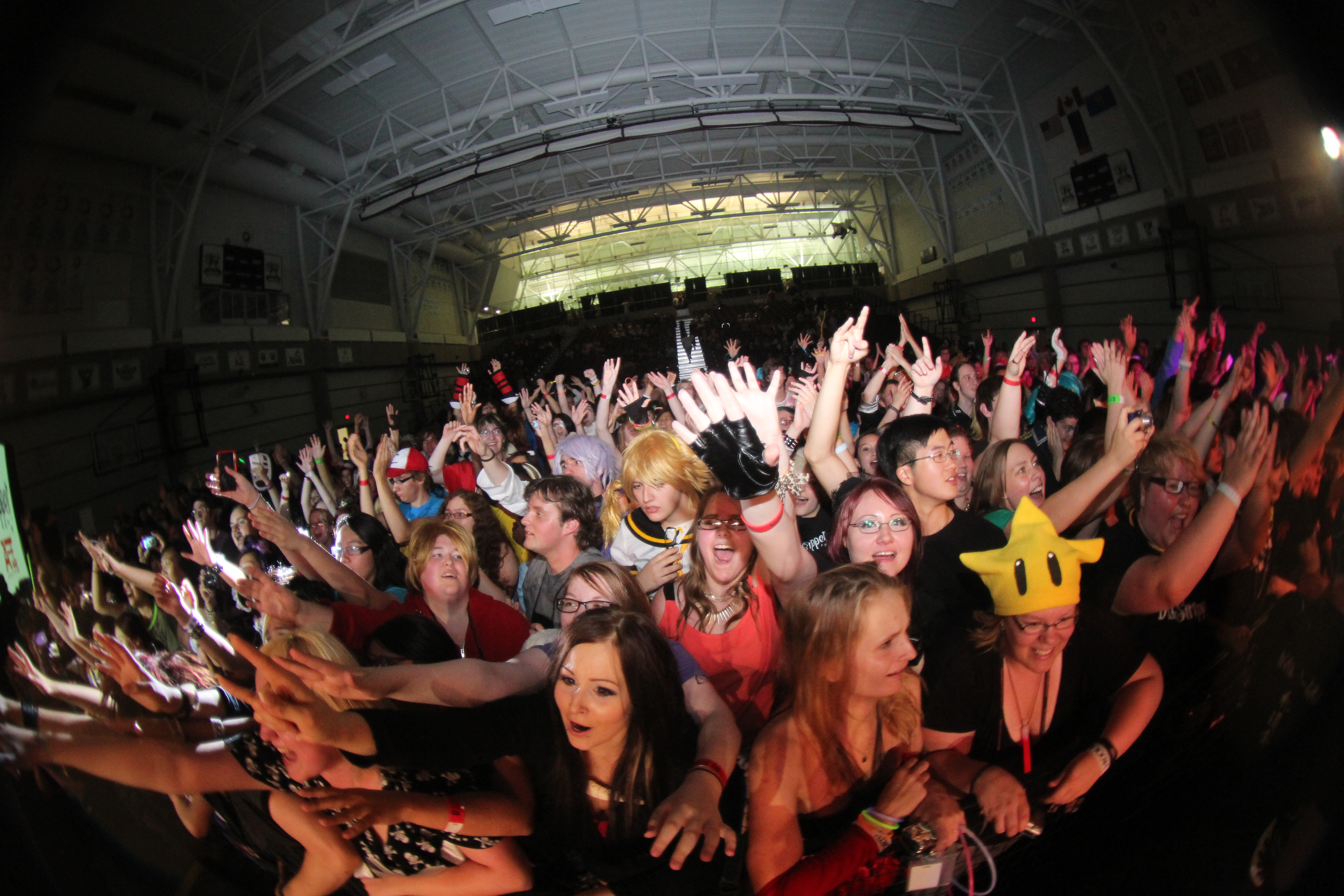
Conventions goers enjoying the Japanese concert at Animethon 19

Animethon is a three-day anime convention held annually at Edmonton Convention Centre in Edmonton, Alberta and organized by the non-profit organization Alberta Society for Asian Popular Arts (ASAPA). It is Canada's longest-running anime convention, the first being held in 1994.

== History ==
Animethon was formed back in 1994 by the University of Alberta's anime club, Banzai Anime Klub of Alberta (BAKA), with the intention of promoting Japanese anime. The first Animethon was a one-day event that allowed people to view different Japanese anime movies and television shows within two classrooms at Grant MacEwan. It became a success by presenting well-known and more obscure anime to audiences and has since grown to what it is now. From there, it expanded to the whole 106 Street building during Animethon 2 through 10. It was not until Animethon 11 that the festival grew to utilize the entire university campus for events, artist alley, education panels, and a large vendor hall. As such, the steady increase of numbers in attendees to Animethon has allowed for various vendors to expose themselves to a unique group of people both young and old.

Due to the convention's growth, in 2018 it moved to the Shaw Conference Centre (now known as the Edmonton Convention Centre). Since 2019, Animethon has hit the 10k attendance mark and also to be one of the longest running anime convention in Canada.

The event was not held in 2020 and 2021 due to the COVID-19 pandemic, but returned in August 2022.

Animethon has experienced several years of consecutive growth in attendance while increasing their scope to include musical guests from Japan such as Flow, Rookiez Is Punk'd, Yoko Ishida, Kanon Wakeshima, An Cafe, and Ladybeard.

In 2024, Animethon introduced Music Fes, a concerts series featuring international musical acts performing each night during the convention.

== Events and programming ==
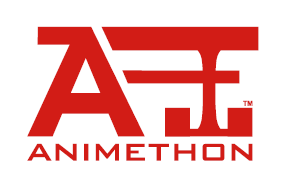
Logo prior to 2024

Animethon has expanded their focus beyond screening anime and now also include voice actor guests from North America, musical acts from North America and Japan, improvisation groups, as well as various related activities such as gaming, costume contests, anime music video compilations/contests, and more.

=== Event history ===
Dates	Location	Attendance	Guests
August 13, 1994	Grant MacEwan Community College; Edmonton, Alberta		
July 8–9, 1995	Grant MacEwan Community College; Edmonton, Alberta	80	
July 13–14, 1996	Grant MacEwan Community College; Edmonton, Alberta	300	
July 12–13, 1997	Grant MacEwan Community College; Edmonton, Alberta	1,200	
July 11–12, 1998	Grant MacEwan Community College; Edmonton, Alberta	2,500	
July 10–11, 1999	Grant MacEwan Community College; Edmonton, Alberta	2,700	
July 15–16, 2000	Grant MacEwan College; Edmonton, Alberta	1,800	
July 14–15, 2001	Grant MacEwan College; Edmonton, Alberta, Canada	3,000	
July 13–14, 2002	Grant MacEwan College; Edmonton, Alberta		
July 12–13, 2003	Grant MacEwan College; Edmonton, Alberta	4,000	
July 17–18, 2004	Grant MacEwan College; Edmonton, Alberta	4,700	The 404s and Debbie Munro
August 5–7, 2005	Grant MacEwan College; Edmonton, Alberta	3,755	The 404s, Rob Bakewell, Brian Dobson, and Debbie Munro.
July 7–9, 2006	Grant MacEwan College; Edmonton, Alberta	3,450	Randy Brososky, Consplayers.com, Trevor Devall, Brian Dobson, Michael Dobson, Tom Edwards, Cole Howard, Kirby Morrow, and PikminLink.
August 10–12, 2007	Grant MacEwan College; Edmonton, Alberta	4,349	The 404s, Trevor Devall, Tiffany Grant, Matt Greenfield, Kyle Hebert, and Vic Mignogna.
August 8–10, 2008	Grant MacEwan College; Edmonton, Alberta	4,679	The 404s, Randy Brososky, Michael Daingerfield, Kyle Hebert, Stephen Notley, and Sonny Strait.
August 7–9, 2009	Grant MacEwan College; Edmonton, Alberta	4,881	The 404s, Michael Daingerfield, Aaron Dismuke, Paul Dobson, Caitlin Glass, The Slants, and Brad Swaile.
August 6–8, 2010	Grant MacEwan University; Edmonton, Alberta	4,753	The 404s, Chris Cason, Brian Dobson, Michael Dobson, Paul Dobson, Kyle Hebert, L33tStr33t Boys, Wendy Powell, Spike Spencer, Synaptic Chaos Theatre, Thwomp
August 5–7, 2011	Grant MacEwan University; Edmonton, Alberta	5,346	The 404s, Bespa Kumamero, Todd Haberkorn, L33tStr33t Boys, Kirby Morrow, Trina Nishimura, Synaptic Chaos Theatre
August 10–12, 2012	Grant MacEwan University; Edmonton, Alberta	6,404	The 404s, Johnny Yong Bosch, DaizyStripper, Eyeshine, Todd Haberkorn, Synaptic Chaos Theatre, Cathy Weseluck
August 9–11, 2013	Grant MacEwan University; Edmonton, Alberta	8,058	The 404s, Troy Baker, Capella, Combofiend, Carol-Anne Day, DJ Shimamura, Lucas Gilbertson, Brendan Hunter, Christopher Sabat, Patrick Seitz, Twinfools and Nova, Kanon Wakeshima.
August 8–10, 2014	MacEwan University; Edmonton, Alberta	8,728	The 404s, An Cafe, Cherami Leigh, Magistina Saga, Monica Rial, Karen Strassman, Cristina Vee, Vensy, Satsuki Yukino
August 7–9, 2015	MacEwan University; Edmonton, Alberta	9,468	The 404s, Liui Aquino, Christine Marie Cabanos, Flow, Josh Grelle, Carrie Keranen, Jamie Marchi, Brina Palencia, Sarah Williams
August 5–7, 2016	MacEwan University; Edmonton, Alberta	8,874	The 404's Improv, Akira, Another Story, Misa Chiang, Caitlin Glass, Ladybeard, Lotus Juice, Orbis Symphony Orchestra, Bryce Papenbrook, Eric Vale
August 11–13, 2017	MacEwan University; Edmonton, Alberta	8,218	The 404's Improv, Baozi & Hana, Ray Chase, Robbie Daymond, Josh Grelle, Mika Kobayashi, Max Mittelman, Orbis Symphony Orchestra, Micah Solusod, TeddyLoid, TheIshter, The Sixth Lie
August 10–12, 2018	Shaw Conference Centre; Edmonton, Alberta	9,821	The 404s, Stella Chuu, Kanako Ito, Mela Lee, Erica Lindbeck, Jamie Marchi, Orbis Symphony Orchestra, Monica Rial, Rookiez Is Punk'd, Daisuke Sakaguchi
August 9–11, 2019	Edmonton Convention Centre; Edmonton, Alberta	10,062	The 404s, ChouCho, Erika Harlacher, Brendan Hunter, Yoko Ishida, Kengo Kawanishi, King Redeem, Daman Mills, Phil Mizuno, Masakazu Ogawa (Sunrise Beyond), Mami Okada (Bang Zoom! Entertainment), Sayaka Sasaki, Ricky Watson (Bang Zoom! Entertainment)
August 5–7, 2022	Edmonton Convention Centre; Edmonton, Alberta	14,617	The 404s, Apricity Dance Crew, Khoi Dao, Chris Hackney, Nano, Pure Octane, SennaRin, Laura Stahl, Windrise Band, VTuber Talents (Aries Shepard, Ariru, Hazumi Aileen, Melon Minty, Muga, MuyingVT, OniGiri, Silvi, Yumemi)
July 14–16, 2023	Edmonton Convention Centre; Edmonton, Alberta	15,473	The 404s, Apricity Dance Crew, Ai Furihata, Brianna Knickerbocker, James Landino, Mimyu Dance Group, Pure Octane, Ratana, Stereo Dive Foundation, Sarah Williams, Windrise Band, YuzuPyon, VTuber Talents (EIEN Project, Silvi, Teeny, Yumemi)
August 9–11, 2024	Edmonton Convention Centre; Edmonton, Alberta	15,000+	The 404s, Sally Amaki, Yoshiharu Ashino, Miura Ayme, Demondice, Aika Kobayashi, Myth & Roid, Yuki Nakashima, Pure Octane, Kaho Shibuya, Konomi Suzuki, Yoshihiro Watanabe, YuzuPyon, VTuber Talents (Dokibird, EIEN Project, Silvi, Teeny, Yumemi)
August 8–10, 2025	Edmonton Convention Centre; Edmonton, Alberta	15,000+	The 404s, Asaka, Bill Butts, ClariS, Junna, Maho Film (Kumiko Habara, Nobuyoshi Habara, Mayuka Kawasumi), May'n, Sick2, Hidetaka Tenjin, Yuc'e, VTuber Talents (3AM, Cottontail, Glitch Star, Hazumi, Kira Lily, Little Nii, Nene Amano, PiaPiUFO, Raki Kazuki, Ririsya, Sayu Sincronisity, Silvi, Unnämed, Vivaria)
August 7–9, 2026	Edmonton Convention Centre; Edmonton, Alberta		The 404s, Minori Chihara, Daoko, Densetsu.Exe, Hellbroth, Kamei Hiroshi, Alan Lee, Maho Film (Naoki Okamoto, Satoshi Shibata), Ma'Scar'Piece, Erica Mendez, Kenji Nojima, The Idolmaster Shiny Colors (Azusa Shizuki, Sayaka Kitahara, Saran Tajima), Who-ya Extended, VTuber Talents (Aida Lyra, Araka Luto, Bear the Witch, Bonnie Barkswell, Ekkomori, Essie, Eva Ananova, florAtelier, Inanna Bell, Lazuli, Lucky Loveshot, Majokko Meimi, Miyuora, Mwocha, Nana Asteria, Nemimi Yane, Oshiriko, Penny Puffball, PillowDear, rachie, Raki Kazuki, Rio Fukai, Roseychuu, Seion Aera, Sena Praline, Starbii, Vivaria Virtual, Xiulan Long, Yukinoshita Peo)

=== A Taste of Animethon ===
A Taste of Animethon was first created in 2010. Initially, it was a smaller event meant to supplement ASAPA's lineup of events, but grew quickly and was eventually moved to the Shaw Conference Centre in 2016. It was suspended after the 2018 event due to the difficulties of simultaneously planning Animethon and an increasingly-large Taste of Animethon.

The event was intended to be revived in 2022 to make up for the cancellation of the 2020 and 2021 events due to the COVID-19 pandemic. However, the event was ultimately cancelled due to Omicron variant.

Dates	Location	Atten.	Guests
February 27, 2010	Grant MacEwan University; Edmonton, Alberta, Canada	600	Synaptic Chaos Theatre
February 12, 2011	Grant MacEwan University; Edmonton, Alberta, Canada	800	The 404s
January 28, 2012	Grant MacEwan University; Edmonton, Alberta, Canada	1,200	Synaptic Chaos Theatre
January 26, 2013	The Ramada Conference Centre Downtown; Edmonton, Alberta, Canada	1,505	The 404s
January 31 – February 1, 2014	The Ramada Conference Centre Downtown; Edmonton, Alberta, Canada	2,295	The 404s, Kyle Hebert, TheIshter
February 20–21, 2015	The Ramada Conference Centre Downtown; Edmonton, Alberta, Canada	2,371	The 404s, Courtney "Courtoon" Morelock, Bryce Papenbrook
January 22–23, 2016	Shaw Conference Centre; Edmonton, Alberta, Canada	3,065	The 404s, Misako Aoki, Colleen Clinkenbeard, Edmonton Concept Pop Orchestra, Reika, TheIshter
January 20–21, 2017	Shaw Conference Centre; Edmonton, Alberta, Canada	2,915	The 404s, Aimee Blackschleger, Clifford Chapin, Hey Listen, Aza Miyuko, Cassandra Lee Morris, Mike Sass
January 19–20, 2018	Shaw Conference Centre; Edmonton, Alberta, Canada	2,926	The 404s, Bryson Baugus, Nobutoshi Canna, Lauren Landa

== ASAPA control ==
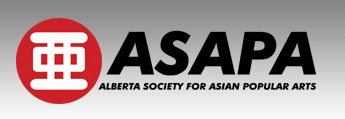
ASAPA Official Logo

In 2004, the event was transferred to a new society, the Alberta Society for Asian Popular Arts (ASAPA), a non-profit society that focuses on the promotion and enjoyment of Asian popular art and culture. The society is also the financial and legal backbone of Animethon, formed under the Societies Act of Alberta.
