= Chaiya Mitchai =

Thai luk thung singer and actor (born 1974)

- ไชยา มิตรชัย
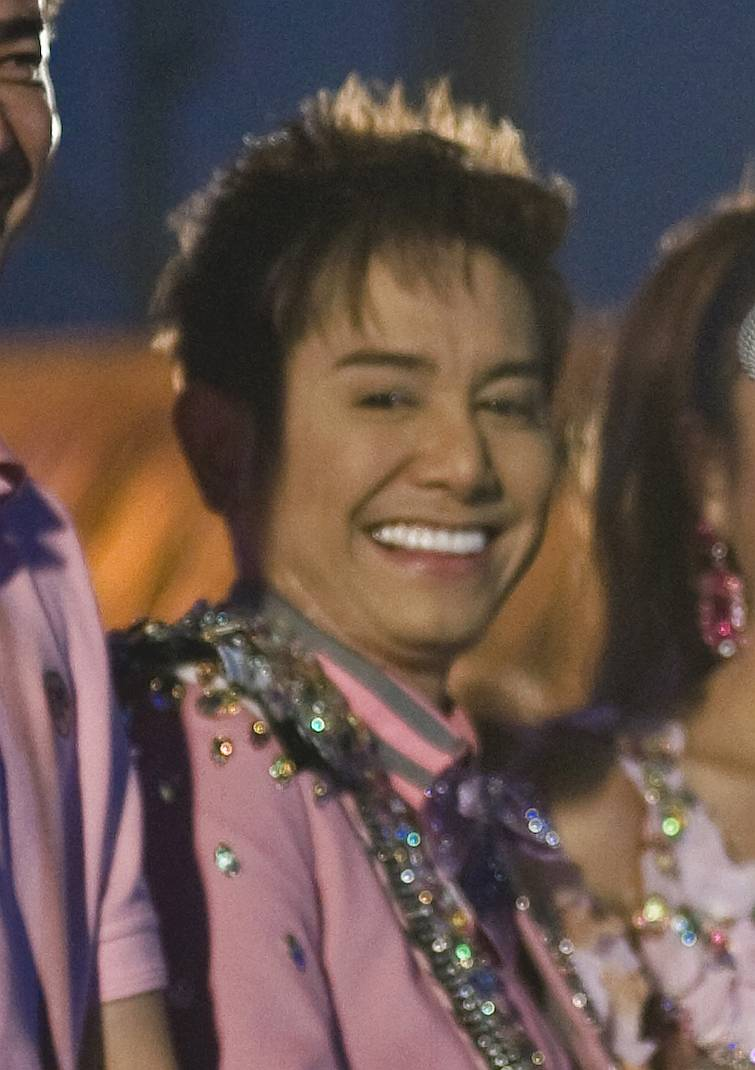
- Mitchai at a government-sponsored concert (2009)
- Born: Sayma Somboon; April 5, 1974 (age 52); Wiset Chaichan, Ang Thong, Thailand
- Other names: A (เอ); Chaiya Mitchai (ไชยา มิตรชัย)
- Occupations: Likay; actor; singer; MC
- Height: 1.57 m (5 ft 2 in)
- Website: Archived 19 April 2010 at the Wayback Machine

Chaiya Mitchai (Thai: เอ, ไชยา มิตรชัย) (born April 5, 1974) is a Thai luk thung singer with likay and drama actor.

== Life ==
Mitchai born as Sayma Somboon (nicknamed A) in Wiset Chaichan, Ang Thong, central Thailand on April 5, 1974, to Somsak Jaikwang (ex-Likay actor and songwriter) and Duangduen Somboon (ex-Likay actress). He has a younger sister (Ann Mitchai), a younger brother (Mit Mitchai) and graduated with a Bachelor of Law from Ramkhamhaeng University.

His stage name comes from a combination of the names of two legendary Thai stars were Chaiya Suriyan and Mitr Chaibancha.

He became famous for his songs titled Gra-tong long tang (กระทงหลงทาง, "lost krathong") with Mai tham-mada (ไม่ธรรมดา, "uncommon") in 1997.

In 2017, he admitted that actress Pornphatchanok Somboon was his daughter, while the public previously knew her as his younger sister.

== Discography ==
- Gam-praa aa-won กำพร้าอาวรณ์
- Tayp gaan gu-son เทปการกุศล
- Jao baao som-mut เจ้าบ่าวสมมุติ
- Gra-tom saao mern กระท่อมสาวเมิน
- Pua nok ban-chee ผัวนอกบัญชี
- Long rak-dok faa หลงรักดอกฟ้า
- Rim grai-raat ริมไกรราศ
- Suay tee sut สวยที่สุด
- Man man kem kem มันๆ เค็มๆ
- Moo nee mee dtae pak หมูหนีมีแต่ผัก
- Tay pee chaai-klong เทพีชายคลอง
- Dton wai bpai baan rao ต้อนไว้ไปบ้านเรา
- Gra-tong long taang กระทงหลงทาง
- Look tòok leum ลูกถูกลืม
- Playng rak jaak chaiya เพลงรักจากไชยา
- Chaiya laa-buat ไชยาลาบวช
- San-yaa · 2 · bpee สัญญา 2 ปี
- Gra-tong teung fang กระทงถึงฝั่ง
- Moo · Moo · Moo หมู หมู หมู
- OST of Theppabud kon dtaa ngon เพลงประกอบละคร เทพบุตรขนตางอน
- Jai pee yang mee rak ใจพี่ยังมีรัก
- Fah Kieng Dao ฟ้าเคียงดาว
- OST of Poo-Yai Hed VS Gum-Nun Hoi เพลงประกอบละคร ผู้ใหญ่เห็ด Vs กำนันหอย
- Hua bun dai mai haeng หัวบันไดไม่แห้ง Vol. 1
- OST of Theppabud Chood Win เพลงประกอบละคร เทพบุตรชุดวิน
- Sa-wan lom prom pi-raam สวรรค์ล่มพหรมพิราม (New Album Coming Soon!)

== Dramas ==
- Jao Chai Noy(เจ้าชายน้อย)(child)
- Pa Yak Song Paen Din(พยัคฆ์สองแผ่นดิน)(child)
- Nai Hoy Tamil(นายฮ้อยทมิฬ) (Ch7-2001)
- Thep Pa Butr Khon Ta Ngorn(เทพบุตรขนตางอน) (with Ao Petchrada) (Ch3-2004)
- Luk Tee Tuk Lerm (ลูกที่ถูกลืม) (Ch7-1998)
- Kaew Nar Mar(แก้วหน้าม้า) (Ch7-2004)
- Pi Goon Tong (พิกุลทอง) (Ch7)
- Sa Pai Hai Soh (สะใภ้ไฮโซ) (Ch5-2002)
- Cha Cha Cha Thah Ruk (ชะชะช่าท้ารัก) (Ch7)
- Mat Joo Raat Dting Dtong (มัจจุราชติ๊งต๊อง)(with Kob Suvanant)(Ch7)
- Leuat Sam See (เลือดสามสี)(with Ao Petchrada) (Ch3-2005)
- Roi Tai(รอยไถ) (Ch7-2002)
- Poo Yai Hed VS. Kamnun Hoi(ผู้ใหญ่เห็ด VS กำนันหอย) (with Tanyares)(Ch3-2006)
- Por Malai Rimtang(พ่อมาลัยริมทาง) (with Donut Manasnan) (Ch3-2009)
- Theppabut Chood Win(เทพบุตรชุดวิน) (with Namfon Patcharin) (Ch3-2009)
- Poo Yai Baan Na Ya (ผู้ใหญ่บ้านนะยะ)(2010)
- Pom Mai Yaak Bpen Saai Lap (ผมไม่อยากเป็นสายลับ) (with Vicky Sunisa) (Ch3-2010)(upcoming)
- Pun Tai Norrasing (พันท้ายนรสิงห์) (Ch3-2011)

== Likay ==
- Poo Chanah Sib Tid (Part look ruam nom) ผู้ชนะสิบทิศ ตอน ลูกร่วมนม
- Kaew Na Mah แก้วหน้าม้า
- Sood kaen Saen ruk สุดแค้น แสนรัก
- Mae Sord Sa-uern แมสอดสะอื่น
- Sood Tang Ruk สุดทางรัก
- Look Nai Rong Chang ลูกในโรงช้าง(Recommend)
- 3 Kler Jer Ruk 3 3 เกลอเจอรัก
- Pun Tai Norrasing พันท้ายนรสิงห์
- Ror Khun Mhark รอขันหมาก
- Fai Lhuan Vol.1&2 ฝายหลวง ตอน 1&2(shoot @STUDIO บ้าน 400)
- Mae Nark Prakanong Vol.1&2 แม่นาคพระโขนง ตอน 1&2(Eng Sub)(shoot @STUDIO บ้าน 400)
- Sai Gern Gae สายเกินแก้
- Jorm Jai Chaiyagarn จอมใจชัยกานต์
- Yhod Lued Chai Sabai หยดเลือดชายสไบ
- Krai Kah Maharaj ใครฆ่ามหาราช
- Khun Chang Khun Paen ขุนช้างขุนแผน
- Esao Supun อีสาวสุพรรณ
- Happy Birthday Live Concert Vol.1(A)
- Happy Birthday Live Concert Vol.2(Ann)
- pra a-pai ma-nee พระอภัยมณี ตอนที่ 1+2 (N'Mit)(Eng Sub)
- Gumprah Roang Hai กำพร้าร้องไห้(childhood)[Special recommend!!!!!!](รางวัลชนะเลิศ ลิเกประชัน 6 คณะ)
- See Darb Parb Pairee สี่ดาบปราบไพรี

== Movies ==
- The Troop Of Ghost – Likay เดอะโกร๋น ก๊วน กวน ผี – พระเอกลิเก(2004)
- Dark Water – Likay เวิ้งปีศาจ – พระเอกลิเก(2007)
- ผู้ใหญ่บ้านนะยะ (Poo Yai Ban Na Ya) – Channel 3 TV Movie (2010)

== Book ==
- Pocket book : Likay ... Chewit published in May 2006

== MC ==
Television

- 2022 : รายการ ครัวลั่นทุ่ง ศึกเชฟสะท้านทุ่ง ทุกวันเสาร์ เวลา 10.10 น. On Air Channel 8 เริ่มวันเสาร์ที่ 5 กุมภาพันธ์ 2565 with MC Kohtee Aramboy, ChefKent-Vatcharavee Visetpohchanatip

Online
