= Distinguishable =

Distinguishable may refer to:

- Distinguishing attack in cryptography
- Distinguishable interfaces in user interfaces
- Identical particles in statistical mechanics
- Clear enough to be recognized or identified as different.

== See also ==
- Distinction (disambiguation)
