= Chote Praepan =

Thai journalist and writer (1907–1956)

- โชติ แพร่พันธุ์
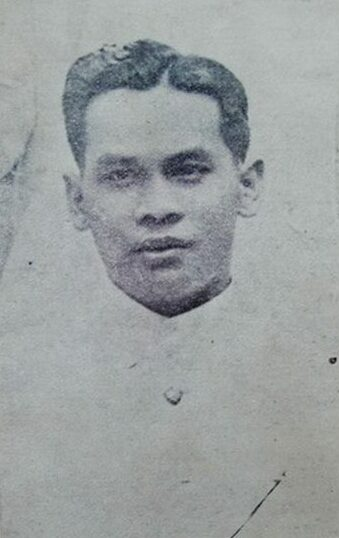
- Born: 15 May 1907
- Died: 5 April 1956 (aged 48)
- Spouse: Prakaisri Sarutanont
- Children: Mana Praepan
- Writing career
- Pen name: Jacob
- Language: Thai

Chote Praepan (Thai: โชติ แพร่พันธุ์, RTGS: Chot Phraephan, 15 May 1907 – 5 April 1956), known by his pen name Jacob (ยาขอบ, RTGS: Yakhop), was a Thai writer. His most famous work is Phu Chana Sip Thit (The Man Who Gained Victory in Ten Directions). He died of tuberculosis in 1956. In 2018, Google ran a Google Doodle in his honor.

Chote Praepan House of Praepan Cadet branch of the House of Thepphawong Born: 15 May 1907 Died: 5 April 1956
Titles in pretence
Preceded by Inplaeng	— TITULAR — Prince Ruler of Phrae; 1920–1956	Succeeded by Mana
