= Rose Media and Entertainment =

Thai entertainment company

Rose Media & Entertainment Public Company Limited
- Type: Public
- Industry: multimedia entertainment
- Genre: films, music, entertainment
- Founded: 1986; 40 years ago
- Founder: Phiraphon Montphichit
- Headquarters: Yan Nawa, Bangkok, Thailand
- Key people: Oraphan Montphichit (vice president)
- Website: www.rose.co.th

Rose Media and Entertainment (Thai: โรส มีเดีย แอนด์ เอ็นเตอร์เทนเมนท์) or formerly known as Rose Video (Thai: โรส วิดีโอ) and Rose Animation (Thai: โรส แอนิเมชั่น) is a Thai entertainment company. It was founded in 1986 by Phiraphon Montphichit. The company markets and distributes films and music, was an anime licensor from 2000 to 2017, and later, the owner of BNK48's label Independent Artist Management.

== History ==
Rose Video was founded in 1986 by Phiraphon Montphichit as a video rental business. The name of the company was inspired by Oraphan's nickname.

The company later changed its name to Rose Media & Entertainment. In 2000, Rose Media started licensing Japanese TV series, both animated and live-action, for the Thai market, flourishing in the late 2000s. Notable series that were licensed by Rose Media & Entertainment include Doraemon, Naruto, Reborn!, Bleach, Sgt. Frog, Hunter x Hunter, and Attack on Titan. The final Rose Media license was Attack On Titan and lost revenue caused several anime licenses to be cancelled in 2017. Today, the company focuses on idol music business and it later established a sub-company called BNK48 Office or Independent Artist Management.

Currently, Rose Media & Entertainment specializes in distribution of music (usually Thai country music) and film.

== Gang Cartoon Channel ==
On September 23, 2008, Rose Media & Entertainment launched the Gang Cartoon Channel (Thai: แก๊งการ์ตูนแชนเนล), a 24-hour cable channel devoted to animated programs based on the Gang Cartoon programming block, which was shown on Thai Channel 5 on weekends from 6:30 to 9:30 am. The channel ceased airing in 2017.

== Licensed properties ==
=== 2000 ===
- Ultraman: The Ultimate Hero
- The Return of Ultraman
- Jumborg Ace

=== 2001 ===
- Dr. Slump (1997)
- Doraemon
- Monster Rancher

=== 2002 ===
- Kyuukyuu Sentai GoGoFive
  - Kyuukyuu Sentai GoGoFive vs. Gingaman
- Mirai Sentai Timeranger
  - Mirai Sentai Timeranger vs. GoGoFive

=== 2003 ===
- Hyakujuu Sentai Gaoranger
  - Hyakujuu Sentai Gaoranger vs. Super Sentai
- Ultraman Zearth
- Kamen Rider Agito the Movie: Project G4
- Sonic X

=== 2004 ===
- Ninpu Sentai Hurricanger
- Ninpu Sentai Hurricanger vs. Gaoranger
- Kamen Rider Ryuki: Episode Final (later distributed by Dream Express)

=== 2005 ===
- Bakuryū Sentai Abaranger
  - Bakuryū Sentai Abaranger vs. Hurricaneger

=== 2006 ===
- Naruto
- Garo
- DAN DOH!!
- Initial D
- Perman
- Kōchū Ōja Mushikingu ~Mori no Tami no Densetsu~
- Tokusou Sentai Dekaranger

=== 2007 ===
- Sgt. Frog
- Bleach
- Mermaid Melody Pichi Pichi Pitch
- Black Jack 21
- Mahou Sentai Magiranger
- Genseishin Justirisers
- Ninja Hattori-kun
- Alex in the Jungle
- Telmo and Tula: Little Cooks
- Fantastic Four: World's Greatest Heroes

=== 2008 ===
- SamSam
- GreenLight, traffic safety
- ToddWorld
- Yu-Gi-Oh! GX
- Ray
- Idaten Jump
- Kirarin Revolution
- Reborn!
- BakéGyamon
- Sugar Sugar Rune
- Kiba
- Fist of the North Star
- Animal Yokochō
- Onegai My Melody
- Saiyuki
- Kekkaishi
- Boys Be...
- Get Ride! AM Driver
- The Melancholy of Haruhi Suzumiya
- Night Head Genesis
- GoGo Sentai Boukenger
- Naruto Shippuden

=== 2009 ===
- Hellboy
- Iron Man
- Doctor Strange
- Teletubbies
- Rupert Bear, Follow the Magic...
- Pururun! Shizuku-chan
- Kekkaishi
- Honey and Clover
- The World of Narue
- Buso Renkin
- Reideen
- Genesis of Aquarion
- Himitsu Sentai Gorenger
- Juken Sentai Gekiranger
- Tomica Hero: Rescue Force (later distributed by Dream Express (DEX))
- B't X
  - B't X Neo
- Soul Eater
- Hello Kitty
- Dinosaur King
- Mirmo!

=== 2010 ===
- Engine Sentai Go-onger
- Fairy Tail
- Fullmetal Alchemist
- Hayate the Combat Butler
- Shakugan no Shana Second
- Nura: Rise of the Yokai Clan
- Black Butler
- Lucky Star
- Inuyasha
- KimiKiss Pure Rouge
- Legends of the Dark King
- Metal Fight Beyblade
- Bamboo Blade
- Durarara!!
- Casper
- Battle B-Daman
- Inazuma Eleven

=== 2011 ===
- Cross Game
- Bakuman
- Infinite Stratos
- Oreimo
- The Familiar of Zero
- Beelzebub
- Maria Holic
- Heroman
- Yatterman
- Shugo Chara!
- Samurai Sentai Shinkenger

=== 2012 ===
- Accel World
- Sword Art Online
- Toriko
- Hunter x Hunter (2011)
- Sket Dance
- Guilty Crown
- Yumeiro Patissiere
- Fate/Zero
- Tegami Bachi
- Chihayafuru
- Mayo Chiki!
- Ground Control to Psychoelectric Girl
- Winter Sonata
- Star Driver: Kagayaki no Takuto
- Shakugan no Shana Final
- Kaizoku Sentai Gokaiger

=== 2013 ===
- Attack on Titan
- No Matter How I Look at It, It's You Guys' Fault I'm Not Popular!
- Love, Chunibyo & Other Delusions
- Free!
- The Devil Is a Part-Timer!
- Date A Live
- Amagami SS
- Valvrave the Liberator
- Photo Kano
- Golden Time
- La storia della Arcana Famiglia
- The Ambition of Oda Nobuna
- Unofficial Sentai Akibaranger

=== 2014 ===
- Naruto: Rock Lee & His Ninja Pals
- No-Rin
- High School DxD
- K
- My Little Monster
- The Irregular at Magic High School
- Akame ga Kill!
- Kamisama Hajimemashita
- Glasslip
- Fantasista Doll
- Love, Chunibyo & Other Delusions -Heart Throb-
- Beyond the Boundary
- Cross Fight B-Daman
- Tokumei Sentai Go-Busters

=== 2015 ===
- Is the Order a Rabbit?
- Zyuden Sentai Kyoryuger
- Care Bears: Adventures in Care-a-lot
