= Charin Nantanakorn =

Thai singer (1933–2024)

- ชรินทร์ นันทนาคร
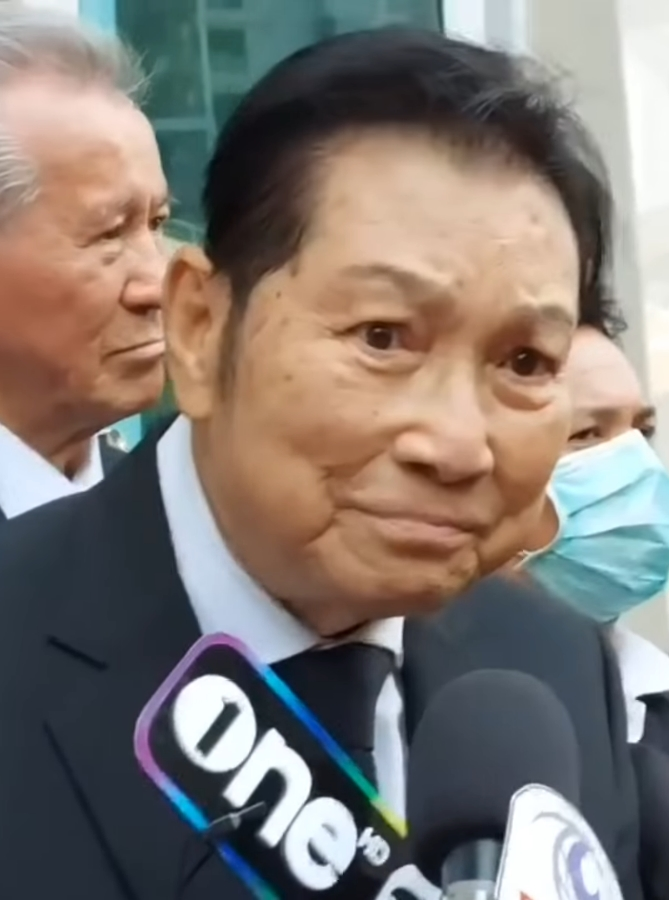
- Nantanakorn in 2020
- Born: Mai Wattanathanin; 1 February 1933; Chiang Mai Province, Siam
- Died: 20 August 2024 (aged 91); Bangkok, Thailand
- Occupations: Singer; Actor; Film director; Film producer
- Spouses: Sapan Thienprasit; Petchara Chaowarat
- Children: Three (two daughters with Sapan and one with Petchara but died)
- Awards: 1998 National Artist Performing Arts (International Thai Songs - Sing)

Charin Nanthanakorn (formerly Charin Ngam-muang) (1 February 1933 – 20 August 2024) was a Thai artist, singer, actor, film director, and producer. He was recognized by the National Cultural Commission as a National Artist Performing Arts in 1998 (International Thai Songs - Sing). His second marriage was with Petchara Chaowarat, a former actor in Thailand and a National Artist Performing Arts, nicknamed "Heroine Eyes Honey Drops".

Charin Nantanakorn co-created the song "Psalm Maharaja", which won him the "Conch Ngern" honorary award for using art to create patriotism and support the monarchy.

Nantanakorn sang international Thai songs mixed with traditional Thai songs. He recorded about 1,500 songs.

== Early life ==
Charin Ngam-Muang was born on Chiang Mai Province on 1 February 1933, graduated Primary School from Dara Academy, Secondary school from Montfort College Chiang Mai Province and Assumption Commercial College Bangkok. He learned to sing with composer Kru Salai Krailert, and started singing interludes in the stage play Nang Prai in 1949.

== Career ==
His recording of song "Duangjai Nai Fun" was released that year, followed by "Adonis Lament" (อิเหนารำพัน) in 1951. Then he returned to Chiang Mai, to work at Kamol-Sukosol Company. The head office called him to work in Bangkok in the accounting department, foreign department to the platter department.

His surname Nantanakorn was given by King Bhumibol Adulyadej (Rama IX), meaning "the one who gives happiness to the city people".

Nantanakorn died at the Police General Hospital in Bangkok on 20 August 2024, at the age of 91.
