= Distinction =

Distinction, distinct or distinctive may refer to:

- Distinction (philosophy), the recognition of difference
- Formal distinction
- Distinction (law), a principle in international humanitarian law governing the legal use of force in an armed conflict
- Distinction (sociology), a social force that places different values on different individuals
- Distinct (mathematics)
- Distinctive feature, a concept in linguistics
- Distinción, in Spanish, separating consonantal sounds, see Phonological history of Spanish coronal fricatives
- The Hua–Yi distinction, the difference between China (Hua) and barbarian outsiders (Yi), applied culturally and ethnically
- Distinction (book), a book by Pierre Bourdieu
- Distinction (horse), Irish gelding, third in the 2005 Melbourne Cup
- Distinction (song), song and album by The Suffrajets

== Awards and honors ==
- an Award or quality of an award recipient
- Latin honors, indications of relative achievement among academic degree recipients
- Any one of the Nine Distinctions(Bestowments), awarded by the Chinese emperor
- Order of Distinction, award in the Jamaican school honours system
- in Austrian Bundesheer, German Bundeswehr and Norwegian Army synonym for rank insignia

== See also ==
- Distinguishable (disambiguation)
