= Ramkhamhaeng University =

University in Bangkok, Thailand

Coordinates: 13°45′19″N 100°37′13″E

- มหาวิทยาลัยรามคำแหง
- Motto: เปลวเทียนให้แสง รามคำแหงให้ทาง (RTGS: Pleothian Hai Saeng Ramkhamhaeng Hai Thang, transl. As a candle gives light, Ramkhamhaeng guides your way)
- Type: Public, Knowledge market university with Open-door policy
- Established: 1971
- Affiliations: ASAIHL
- Budget: 1,179 million baht (FY2019)
- Rector: Assistant Professor Wutisak Lapcharoensap (acting)
- Royal conferrer: Maha Chakri Sirindhorn, Princess Royal of Thailand on behalf of the King
- Students: 435,000
- Undergraduates: 400,000
- Postgraduates: 35,000
- Location: Bangkok, Thailand
- Newspaper: The Ramkhamhaeng News
- Colors: Blue and Gold
- Website: www.ru.ac.th

Ramkhamhaeng University (RU; Thai: มหาวิทยาลัยรามคำแหง, RTGS: Mahawitthayalai Ramkhamhaeng) is Thailand's largest public university. It was named in honour of King Ramkhamhaeng.

== Overview ==
Ramkhamhaeng University has two major campuses, both in Bangkok. Freshman classes are held at Bang Na campus in Prawet district. Most others classes are conducted at the main campus at Hua Mak, Bang Kapi District. Approximately 435,000 students attend the university, 400,000 undergraduates and 35,000 graduate students. Tuition fees are in the range of 7,155–8,880 baht per academic year. The university's budget allocation from the central government for FY2019 is 1,179 million baht, down from FY2018.

== Notable alumni ==
- Abhisit Vejjajiva (born 1964), politician and Thailand's 27th prime minister
- Sitang Buathong (born 1962), actress and internet personality
- NistA and NistY Krusagayavong (born 1997), singer-songwriter, rapper, model and actress twin sisters
