= Stamford International University =

Private university in Thailand

- มหาวิทยาลัยนานาชาติแสตมฟอร์ด
- Type: Private For-profit
- Established: 29 November 1995
- Location: Cha-am, Phetchaburi and Bangkok, Thailand; 13.73471°N 100.662186°E
- Website: stamford.edu

Stamford International University Thailand (STIU) (Thai: มหาวิทยาลัยนานาชาติแสตมฟอร์ด) is a private for-profit university. It was a partner of Laureate International Universities since 2011 until Laureate International Universities decided to cease its operations in Asia-pacific. Stamford International University continues to operate today.
