= Likay =

Thai folk theatre

Snippet from a likay performance at Wat Khung Taphao, Uttaradit Province

Likay (Thai: ลิเก pronounced [líʔ.kēː], RTGS: like; Jawi script: جيكيي; Khmer: យីកេ [ˈjiːkeː]), is a form of folk opera popular in Thailand, Cambodia, and Malaysia. It emerged in the late 19th century and is generally believed to have originated in the Malay-inhabited regions of Southern Thailand.

Its uniqueness is found in the combination of extravagant costumes with barely equipped stages and vaguely determined storylines, so that the performances depend mainly on the actors' skills of improvisation and the audiences' imagination.

== Origin ==
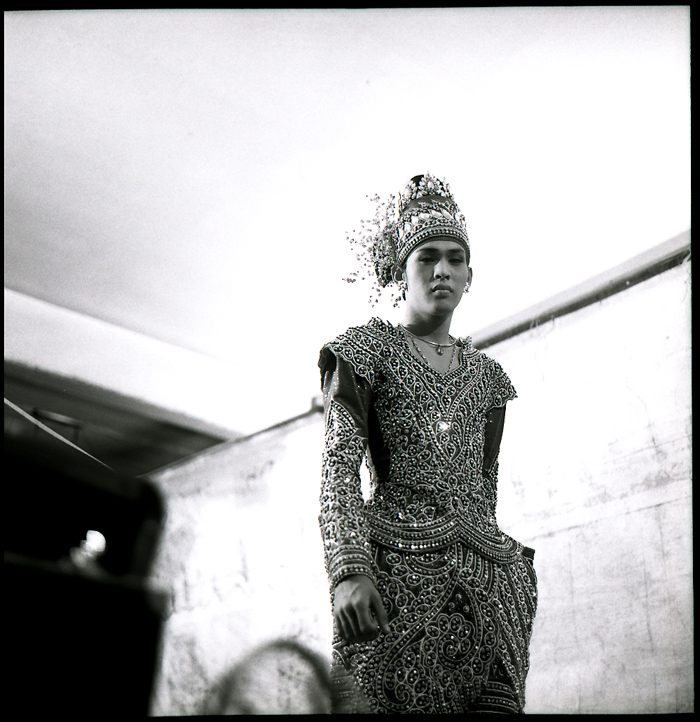
Likay Actor

There are several competing ideas about the origins and development of likay. However, the most likely is that likay has roots in the Malay jikey, an Islamic chant. Since there is a wide gap between this religious performance and folk entertainment, it is also possible that likay derives from India instead, especially as there are many Indian dance gestures found in the actors' performances.

The lack of historic references also creates controversy about the first emergence of likay, but it is most likely to have emerged as a distinct form of theatre in the late-19th century. Today the performances mainly take place in rural areas, at temple fairs, and private sponsored events. Even though TV and radio still broadcast performances of likay, this form of folk theatre is becoming rarer.

== Repertoire ==
=== Stories and characters ===
The likay story repertoire ranges from historic incidents to well known folk tales larded with humorous anecdotes. The main characters are phra ek (hero), nang ek (heroine), tua kong (villain), tua itcha (villainess), and tua talok or joke (male or female clowns) in the roles of stereotyped princesses, kings, and lower class figures with caricatured appearances and a lot of freedom in speech. Their fates unfold in stories of love which usually involve overcoming obstacles, as well as in family dramas which always have a happy ending. Although the language and character of some of the figures are rude and barely represent appropriate decency, good and bad are sharply distinguished and the troupes leave the audience with a clear moral with the good always defeating the bad.

=== Popular characters ===
The figures Khun Chang and Khun Paen are amongst the most popular characters in likay. Based on a well-known Thai folklore tale (named after the two main characters Khun Chang Khun Phaen) about a dramatic love triangle, the two men compete for one beautiful woman and reappear in countless likay performances.

Another popular character borrowed from local ghost folklore is Mae Nak Phra Khanong. Her story, also about love and death, focuses on her afterlife as a ghost. Her unbreakable love for her husband, even beyond death, and the terror she spreads out of jealousy and anger repeatedly finds new interpretations in likay folk theatre.

== Performance ==
"Awk khaek" (Thai: ออกแขก; RTGS: ok khaek) is the performance before likay begins when the performer comes out with an Indian-Malaysian costume to sing and dance to a song. Awk khaek came from India with the Malayan Peninsula group that came to Siam during the Ayutthaya period (1259-1767 CE), but this performance has changed with time. There is disagreement where the name comes from, but L. Allan Eubank says that the word "awk" means "out" and the word "khaek" is the Thai word for Indian. The importance of awk khaek is to tell everyone to know that the likay will start soon.

In general, after an hour-long prelude with piphat music, the plot and dialogue follow a basic outline given by the troupe's storyteller, unfolding through the actors' improvised verses, song lyrics, and action. This impromptu performance is supported by musicians who capture and highlight the spontaneous development with their instruments, often including both modern pop music and traditional country music. Dances appear only rarely when an actor or actress feels like the situation calls for it.

Originally the troupes' actors were all men but nowadays men and women play together. It appears that there is a strong bond between audience and performers, so that it is very common for the story to unfold in a way that pleases the audiences or for the audience to be addressed directly. This is especially true for the joker, who is allowed to switch between the performance and the audience, adding a sense of open interaction. The audience is also drawn into the play by the need for their imagination. As likay troupes are itinerant and have no fixed venue, the makeshift stage and repertoire usually does not offer more than a bench (tiang) and the rough setting of a palace garden and a forest which allows the actors to play most scenes. The audience has to listen carefully to the explanation of space and time by the actors or storyteller and imagine the scenery themselves.

== Costumes ==
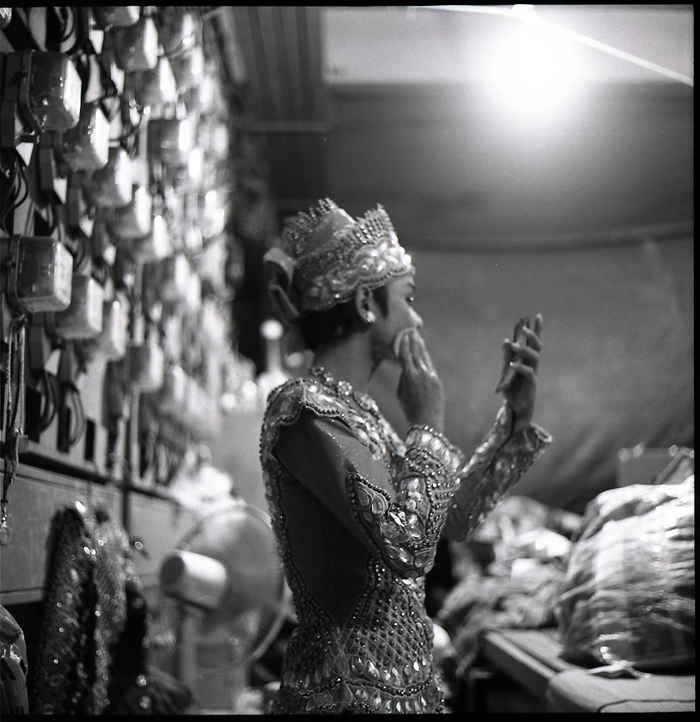
Likay Make-Up

Likay is famous for its flamboyant costumes. Heavy make-up, from the darkest black eyeliner to the brightest red lipstick, and colorful, glittering, fake jewels for both men and women are standard. Responsible for most of the outfitting themselves, the actors not only bring their costumes but also create their own masks. For men, the costume includes colorful or golden stuffed knickerbockers, long white socks, blouses and vests with excessive ornaments, glittering earrings, and plumed headbands. The women wear clothes in both modern and traditional fashions of shining silk and satin.
