= Dream Express (DEX) =

Thai anime licensing company

Dream Express (DEX) Co., Ltd.
- Company type: Private
- Industry: Multimedia entertainment
- Founded: 9 July 1999; 26 years ago
- Founder: Kritsana Sukunphanich
- Headquarters: Bang Kapi, Bangkok, Thailand
- Area served: Thailand
- Key people: Kritsana Sukunphanich
- Products: Anime, motion pictures, character merchandises
- Total assets: 218,577,276.9 baht (2015)
- Subsidiaries: DEXpress (publisher)
- Website: www.dex.co.th www.dexclub.com

Dream Express (DEX) Co., Ltd. (Thai: บริษัท ดรีม เอกซ์เพรส (เดกซ์) จำกัด) or DEX is a Thai anime licensing company based in Bangkok. It was founded on 9 July 1999 then start anime licensor business in 2002. The anime series that were licensed by this company include One Piece, Kamen Rider Series (since Heisei series), Ultra Series, Gundam Series, and Love Live! series.
