= Fan Pan Tae =

- Created by: Praphas Cholsaranont
- Developed by: Workpoint Entertainment Public Co., Ltd.
- Starring: Phanya Nirunkul; Teerawat Anuvatudom; Tankhun Jitissara; Ek Himskul; Krit Sripoomseth; Kan Kantathavorn; Puttichai Kasetsin
- Country of origin: Thailand
- Original language: Thai
- No. of episodes: >444 (exclude champions tournament)

Production
- Executive producer: Rungtham Phumsinil
- Camera setup: Multi-camera
- Running time: 65 minutes (since July 4, 2008)

Original release
- Network: Royal Thai Army Radio and Television Channel 5 and Workpoint TV
- Release: September 1, 2000 – January 3, 2024

Fan Pan Tae (Thai: แฟนพันธุ์แท้) is a quiz show from Thailand, first broadcast on 1 September 2000. The game was named best game or quiz programme at the Asian Television Awards in 2003 and 2004. In addition, the show has won multiple awards from many institutions in Thailand.

== Format ==
The game challenges players in all aspects of their passion such as sport, hobby, music, pop culture, famous people, and any knowledge field. Five finalists compete to be the "hard-core fan" ("Sud Yord Fan Pan Tae"). The weekly winner will join the year-end challenge for "Fan of the year".

The first competition involves memorization and spontaneous response in answering the question pictures within 3 seconds. The next break pits two pairs against each other to find the last two contestants by answering a question from a hint of a given qualification or jigsaw game. The final round lets the last two contestants answer a question from a hint of a given qualification to find the last man standing. In the last break, the winner who is able to answer the special question will become “The genuine fan” and receive special unique prizes. At the end of the year, winners from each telecast will join the year-end challenge for “Fan of the Year” for the grand prize, such as land, a house and a brand new car (Toyota Camry in 2007), which is worth more than 4 million bahts.

== Episodes ==
=== Season 1 (2000) ===
Ep.	Name	Topic	Airdate	Moderator	Result
0.	Fanpantae Scoop "Sayan Sanya"		August 18, 2000	San Eittisukkhanan and Nong Chachacha	Introducing tape of Fan Pan Tae
1.	Nitithep Tawilrat	Carabao	September 1, 2000	Phanya Nirunkul and Teerawat Anuvatudom	Right
2.	Buranit Rattanawichian (Bo Boo)	Manchester United F.C.	September 15, 2000	Phanya Nirunkul	Right
3.	Wanphen Totsiang	Chaiya Mitchai	September 22, 2000	Phanya Nirunkul	Right
4.	Thiphanan Sirichana	Thongchai McIntyre	September 29, 2000	Phanya Nirunkul	Right
5.	Nutrye Wittanon	Rueangsak Loichusak	October 6, 2000	Phanya Nirunkul	Right
6.	Adisorn Puengya (JACKY)	Liverpool F.C. #1	October 13, 2000	Phanya Nirunkul	Wrong
7.	Thaidanut Kraiwattanawong	Suntaraporn	October 27, 2000	Phanya Nirunkul	Wrong
8.	Waraphorn Phukab	Sornram Teppitak	November 3, 2000	Phanya Nirunkul	Right
9.	Ponlanat Chongyotha	Nicole Theriault	November 10, 2000	Phanya Nirunkul	Wrong
10.	Kittichai Makkathamkul	Doraemon	November 24, 2000	Phanya Nirunkul	Right
11.	Thipwan Atthaphot	Chaliang	December 1, 2000	Phanya Nirunkul	Right
12.	Yaowalak Chanchuen	Christina Aguilar	December 15, 2000	Phanya Nirunkul	Wrong
13.	Suratchanee Rukworrakul	Chakkaphan Khonburitheerachot	December 22, 2000	Phanya Nirunkul	Right
Special			December 29, 2000	Phanya Nirunkul	

=== Season 2 (2001) ===
Ep.	Name	Topic	Airdate	Result
1.	Athit Rujirawat	Star Wars	January 5, 2001	Right
2.	Chongbun Sukhinee	Mitr Chaibancha	January 12, 2001	Right
3.	Teeraphat Kulophat	Madonna	January 19, 2001	Wrong
4.	Wiraj Sripong	Ramakien	January 26, 2001	Right
5.	Sarakij Phanamonkol	Suraphol Sombatcharoen	February 2, 2001	Wrong
6.	Phitakphong Chiamsriphong	Kamen Rider Series	February 9, 2001	Wrong
7.	Pong Suphan (Samer Ngio Ngam); Ran Watcharapradit (1st time champion)	Talisman	February 16, 2001; February 23, 2001	Right
8.	Ken Songkwae	Pumpuang Duangjan	March 2, 2001	Wrong
9.	Rachan Wisetkasin	Elvis Presley	March 9, 2001	Wrong
10.	Thanan Jaithong	Academy Award #1	March 23, 2001	Right
11.	Prasan Wongwirojrak	Music of Thailand	March 30, 2001	Wrong
12.	Thamrongsak Pramong	Khai Hua Roh	April 6, 2001	Wrong
13.	Kritsana Phuengching	Asanee–Wasan	April 13, 2001	Wrong
14.	Somphoj Chitkesornphong	Walt Disney	April 20, 2001	Wrong
15.	Than Bamrungsuk	Cinema of Thailand	April 27, 2001	Wrong
16.	Phimparat Kanthathakul	Premier League	May 4, 2001	Wrong
17.	Saphrang Wattathongchai	The Impossibles	May 11, 2001	Wrong
18.	Rompho Udol	Sam Kloe	May 25, 2001	Wrong
19.	Vacharaphan Lavangnananda (1st time champion)	Ultraman	June 1, 2001	Right
20.	Ajrye Sewiwallop	Patiparn Pataweekarn	June 8, 2001	Wrong
21.	Doctor Kittiphum Judasmith	The Beatles #1	June 15, 2001	Right
22.	Charli Prajongkitkul	David Copperfield	June 22, 2001	Right
23.	Prapha Ketkong	Phra Aphai Mani	July 6, 2001	Right
24.	Detective Preecha Bunphrom	Dog	July 13, 2001	Right
25.	Nirut Loharangsee	Ayutthaya Kingdom	July 20, 2001	Right
26.	Phuwanai Tantaranon	Automobile	July 27, 2001	Right
27.	Sombun Ngamsuriyaroj	Bee Gees	August 3, 2001	Right
28.	Phichej Rungchao	Luk thung	August 10, 2001	Right
29.	Weeraphat Manman	Football in Thailand	August 17, 2001	Right
30.	Preecha Wanasinthichaiwat	Romance of the Three Kingdoms	August 24, 2001	Wrong
31.	Kraiphop Jandee (Kop Micro)	Scorpions	August 31, 2001	Wrong
32.	Sakol Warintaraporn; Panjapon Bunmaneechaikul	The Legend of Suriyothai	September 7, 2001; September 14, 2001	Right
33.	Ekphoj Thamphakorn	Muay Thai	September 28, 2001	Right
34.	Yupha Thaothong	Thai language #1	October 5, 2001	Wrong
35.	Chuenkamol Srisomphot	Thai literature	October 12, 2001	Right
36.	Jakkrit Sillapachai (Odd Jakkrit)	Phleng phuea chiwit	October 19, 2001	Right
Starting champion of Fan Pan Tae 2001 tournament			October 26, 2001	

=== Season 3 (2002) ===
Ep.	Thai name	Topic	Airdate	Result
1.	นพ.นิรุตติ์ ประดับญาติ	Harry Potter #1	January 11, 2002	Right
2.	นันทพล นำเบญจพล	Liverpool F.C. #2	January 18, 2002	Right
3.	นพดล สัจจพงษ์	Politics of Thailand	January 25, 2002	Right
4.	กิตติกร จูฑะวชิรโรจน์	Thai herbs	February 1, 2002	Right
5.	ธีระศักดิ์ มนตราพิทักษ์	The Legend of The Condor Heroes	February 8, 2002	Wrong
6.	Sroi Mungmee	Thai world champion	February 15, 2002	Right
7.	นพ.สุรัตน์ จันทร์สกุล	History of Rattanakosin	February 22, 2002	Right
8.	Somchai Surachatri	Thai temples	March 1, 2002	Right
9.	ดารณี วงษ์อยู่น้อย	Thai language #2	March 8, 2002	Right
10.	Kornkamon Leelathiraphat	Thai desserts	March 15, 2002	Right
11.	Nathaporn Thaijongrak	History of Sukothai	March 22, 2002	Right
12.	Jenwit Apichainunt	Thai stamps	March 29, 2002	Right
13.	สุพัตรา เกียรติมหาคุณ	Bangkok	April 5, 2002	Right
14.	Dan Bureeram	Luk thung #2	April 12, 2002	Wrong
#	Special Episode (Honor of the FAN)		April 19, 2002	No competition
15.	Pawa Phunmakha	Thai newspaper	April 26, 2002	Right
16.	Phanu Limthong	McDonald's	May 3, 2002	Right
17.	Pornchai Sumativit	Grand ex	May 10, 2002	Right
18.	Chayanit Jaisuekul	Khai Hua Roh #2	May 17, 2002	Right
19.	Panya Manomaisaowapark	Mobile phone #1	May 24, 2002	Right
20.	Ek Himskul	FIFA World Cup	May 31, 2002; June 7, 2002	Right
21.	Chackrit Duangphastra	Kukrit Pramoj	June 14, 2002	Right
22.	Anan Atiwatwongsa	Motorcycle	June 21, 2002	Wrong
23.	Anusorn Sribunma	Tourism in Thailand	June 28, 2002	Right
24.	ธีรภัทร์ ทองนิ่ม	Ramakien #2	July 5, 2002	Right
25.	Somchai Saeng-ngern	Thai banknotes	July 12, 2002	Wrong
26.	ธนโชติ จิตร์เปรมวณิชย์	Pokémon	July 19, 2002	Right
27.	Suppayalak Kongpech	Buddhahood	July 26, 2002	Right
28.	หัสริน หลบหลีกพาล	Bangkok Mass Transit Authority	August 2, 2002	Right
29.	Sommart Srisamacharn (2nd time champion)	Motorcycle #2	August 9, 2002	Right
30.	แสนชัย เวสารัชตระกูล	Thai Movie commercials	August 16, 2002	Wrong
31.	ศิวพล ชัยยะสมุทร (ศิร ชัยยะสมุทร)	Japanese cartoon	August 23, 2002	Right
32.	Nirut Loharangsee	Ayutthaya Kingdom #2	August 30, 2002	Right
33.	Phuchat Kunakilok	Thai Song of 80s	September 6, 2002	Right
34.	กงพัด จรุงกิจอนันต์	World War II	September 13, 2002	Right
35.	กฤตน์ ชื่นเป็นนิจ	James Bond #1	September 20, 2002	Right
36.	ณัฐพงษ์ ศิริรุ่งเรือง	Ornamental fish	October 4, 2002	Right
Starting champion of Fan Pan Tae 2002 tournament			October 11, 2002	

=== Season 4 (2003) ===
Ep.	Name	Topic	Airdate	Result
1.	Preeda Praratthajariya	Yaowarat Road	February 7, 2003	Wrong
2.	Lt. Col.Wanchana Polpalangkoon	Gun	February 21, 2003	Right
3.	Pong Suphan (3rd time champion) (Samer Ngio-Ngam)	Talisman #2	February 28, 2003; March 7, 2003	Right
4.	Arlan Chaipipatkun	WWE	March 14, 2003	Right
5.	Sorakarn Sritong-On	Petprauma	March 21, 2003	Right
6.	Chayanin Nagmanak	Mobile phone #2	March 28, 2003	Wrong
7.	Tassanathep Rattanajinda	World boxing	April 4, 2003	Right
8.	Wan Payakkachai	Carabao #2	April 11, 2003	Right
9.	Torn Tumrongnavasawat	Thai seas	April 18, 2003	Right
10.	Yuttapong Saphathong	Thai fruits	April 25, 2003	Right
11.	Tanongchai Luxsagha	Cinema of Thailand #2	May 2, 2003	Wrong
12.	Wachara Sanguansombat	Thai birds	May 9, 2003	Right
13.	Thosaphon Chieocharnpraphan	Politics of Thailand #2	May 16, 2003	Right
14.	Niphawan Padungros; Kanoknai Thawonphanit	World	May 23, 2003; May 30, 2003	Right
15.	Aphinya Janmongkolpharn	Gu Long	June 6, 2003	Right
16.	Raksapong Viangcharoen	State Railway of Thailand	June 13, 2003	Wrong
17.	Suphaamorn Authaithun	Thongchai McIntyre #2	June 20, 2003	Right
18.	Nitis Pokavattana	Dinosaur	June 27, 2003	Right
19.	Thedpol Wongraksah	Fan of the Fan 2003	July 4, 2003; July 11, 2003; July 18. 2003	Special Competition
20.	Artid Siwhahunsapun	Hollywood films	July 25, 2003	Right
21.	Wachiraporn Chokudommun	Department Store	August 1, 2003	Right
22.	Sasidis Chatarupachewin	Premier League #2	August 12, 2003	Right
23.	Autthapol Wongmungchun	Mercedes-Benz	August 15, 2003	Wrong
24.	Anuchit Charoensrisomjit	Bangkok #2	August 22, 2003	Right
25.	Sunsanee Surojwanichchakun	Mercedes-Benz #2	August 29, 2003	Right
26.	Nirut Loharangsee	Ayutthaya Kingdom #3	September 5, 2003	Right
27.	Docter Kittiphum Juthasmit	The Beatles #2	September 12, 2003	Right
28.	Werawat Suksakunphan	Hong Kong films	September 19, 2003	Right
29.	Darunee Kritbunyalai	Diamond	September 26, 2003	Right
30.	Thida Chongniramaisathit	The Lord of the Rings	October 3, 2003	Right
Starting champion of Fan Pan Tae 2003 tournament			October 10, 2003	

=== Season 5 (2004) ===
Ep.	Thai name	Topic	Airdate	Result
1.	Chetsada Wisatesuk	Mobile phone #3	January 30, 2004	Right
2.	นันทสุทธิ์ ลีลายุทธ	Romance of the Three Kingdoms #2	February 6, 2004	Right
3.	Teerapong Thephassadin Na Ayudhya	Thai Orchid	February 13, 2004	Right
4.	Dr.Chakorn Chansakul	Thonburi Kingdom	February 20, 2004	Right
5.	อารัณย์ ชัยพิพัฒน์กุล (สมัยที่ 2) (อภิสฤษฎิ์ อดิศาสุรารักษ์)	WWE #2	February 27, 2004	Right
6.	Anusorn Sribunma (2nd time champion)	Tourism in Thailand #2	March 5, 2004	Right
7.	Pisit Nithiyanan	Astronomy	March 12, 2004	Right
8.	ศิร ชัยยะสมุทร (สมัยที่ 2)	Japanese cartoon #2	March 19, 2004	Wrong
9.	อัศวิน จำหน่ายผล	Japanese cartoon #3	March 26, 2004	Right
10.	Varisiriya Ngamkerdsiri	Perfume	April 2, 2004	Right
11.	Niphawan Padungros (2nd time champion); Kanoknai Thawonphanit (2nd time champion)	World #2	April 9, 2004; April 16, 2004	Right
12.	Jenwit Apichainunt (2nd time champion)	Thai stamps #2	April 23, 2004	Right
13.	Malai Intongkam	Miss Thailand	April 30, 2004	Right
14.	Dr. Suksawat Ponpinij	Insect	May 7, 2004	Right
15.	Sorrasak Subongkod	Fighter aircraft	May 14, 2004	Right
16.	Anan Atiwatwongsa (2nd time champion)	Motorcycle #3	May 21, 2004; May 28, 2004	Right
17.	น.อ.นรินทร์ นาคมาโนช	Cinema of Thailand #3	June 4, 2004	Right
18.	Ek Himskul (2nd Topic)	UEFA European Championship	June 11, 2004; June 18, 2004	Right
#	Special Episode "Flying with F-16"		June 25, 2004	No Competition
19.	Charinrat Bartpho	Fan of the fan #2	July 2, 2004; July 9, 2004; July 16, 2004; July 23, 2004; July 30, 2004	Special Competition
20.	Ramase Sodarat	Thai Websites	August 6, 2004	Right
21.	Polthep Poonpol	Princess Maha Chakri Sirindhorn's Writings	August 13, 2004	Right
22.	Pramote Rienjaroensuk	Watch	August 20, 2004	Right
23.	Khamphon Thurachen	Governor of Bangkok	August 27, 2004	Right
24.	สัมพันธ์ ถาวรเจริญ	Thai Joker Slapstick	September 3, 2004; September 10, 2004	Right
25.	สุทิน โชคศรีสงวน	Instant noodles	September 17, 2004	Right
26.	Nirut Loharangsee (4th time champion)	Ayutthaya Kingdom #4	September 24, 2004	Right
Starting champion of Fan Pan Tae 2004 tournament			October 1, 2004	

=== Season 6 (2005) ===
Ep.	Thai name	Topic	Airdate	Result
1.	Sandy Hong (5th time champion)	Barbie	February 25, 2005	Right
2.	Wichanya Praiwan	Airline	March 4, 2005	Right
3.	กรัณย์ จิตธารารักษ์	Horror film	March 11, 2005	Right
4.	กรแก้ว พงค์ถาวรภิญโญ	Dog #2	March 18, 2005	Wrong
5.	สุรศักดิ์ กาญจนภูษิต	Karaoke	March 25, 2005	Right
6.	Porntada Suvattanavanich	Thai Novels	April 8, 2005	Right
#	Special Episode "Top Ten of Fan Pan Tae"		April 15, 2005	No Competition
7.	Kriangkrai Siravanichkan โอฬาร ภัทรกอบกิตติ์	Stock Exchange of Thailand	April 29, 2005; May 6, 2005	Right
8.	ประสิทธิ์ ลัคนานิธิพันธุ์	Dog #3	May 13, 2005	Right
9.	ธันวาคม จุลรุจน พุทธมิลินประทีป	Famous People in the world	May 13, 2005	Right
10.	ปรัชญา ชีวโรจน์ฐากูรสุข	Video game	May 27, 2005	Right
11.	Viroj Leetagul	Wine	June 3, 2005	Right
12.	พีระพัฒน์ ตรีชั้น บุญมา นาวาทอง	Used car	June 10, 2005; June 17, 2005	Right
13.	พรเทพ ประดิษฐ์ชัยกุล	Suntaraporn #2	June 24, 2005	Right
14.	Tankhun Jitissara	China–Thailand relations	July 1, 2005	Right
15.	กฤษดา ไพรวรรณ์	Prime Minister of Thailand	July 8, 2005	Right
16.	Kasiti Kamalanavin Rajawangsan	France	July 15, 2005	Right
17.	ธนพล ทับจันทร์	Japanese cuisine	July 22, 2005; July 29, 2005	Right
18.	Wiroj Prakongsri	Jeans	August 5, 2005	Right
19. (Special)	Sommart Srisamacharn	Special "Love mom - Reward grace for the land"	August 12, 2005	Special Competition
20.	ประเสริฐ เจียรกุล พงษ์เทพ อรุณศิริวัฒน์	Dragon Ball	August 19, 2005; August 26, 2005	Right
19. (Rerun)	Sommart Srisamacharn	Special "Love mom - Reward grace for the land" (Rerun)	September 2, 2005	Special Competition
21.	Komkrit Uitekkeng	Mythology	September 9, 2005	Right
22.	ดารากันย์ เจริญจิตต์	Sorayuth Suthassanachinda	September 16, 2005	Right
23.	พีรพล พิมพ์ทน	Cinema of Korea	September 23, 2005	Right
Announcing the poll vote of "Fan of the year 2005"			September 30, 2005	

=== Season 7 (2006) ===
Ep.	Thai name	Topic	Airdate	Result
1.	Danai Samuntkojon (6th time champion)	Superhero	January 20, 2006	Right
2.	Robtis Waiyasusri	Thai Monk Instructor	January 27, 2006	Right
3.	Supanat Benchadumrongkit	Reptile	February 3, 2006	Right
4.	Suton Watanasukho	Cinema of China	February 10, 2006	Right
5.	Kritsada Pridewan (2nd Topic); Kunakrit Shinpark	Rama V	February 17, 2006; February 24, 2006	Right
6.	Keartisat Keawpring	Gemstone	March 3, 2006	Right
7.	Mintra Teitsuthathama	Flower	March 10, 2006	Right
8.	Oop Wiriya (Wiriya Pongardharn); Prasedt Jaemjutithama	Thai Celebrity	March 17, 2006; March 24, 2006	Right
9.	Passakorn Pramunwong	Athletic Shoes	March 31, 2006	Right
10.	Padipark Milindapradheep (Old Name=Padipark Meesomboonpoonsuk)	World of Art	April 7, 2006; April 14, 2006	Right
11.	Sahabhop Dokkaew	Saltwater fish	April 21, 2006; April 28, 2006	Right
12.	Luk Srigate (6th time champion)	Buddharupa	May 5, 2006; May 12, 2006	Right
13.	Katapat Phong-ampai	Super Sentai Series	May 19, 2006	Right
14.	Phanisa Kungsadan	Game Show	May 26, 2006	Wrong
15.	Gun Hunsong	TV Direct	June 2, 2006	Right
16.	Ek Himskul (6th time champion)	FIFA World Cup #2	June 16, 2006; June 23, 2006	Right
17.	Pawinna Phetluan	Archaeological site	June 30, 2006	Right
18.	Chonsarin Nuwan	Boy band & Girl Gang	July 7, 2006	Right
19.	Phanisa Kungsadan	Game Show #2	July 14, 2006	Right
20.	Dr.Pinlattapron Naksombhoun	Cat	July 21, 2006; August 4, 2006	Right
21.	Katanyu Swangsri	a day (Thai Magazine)	August 11, 2006	Right
22.	Watcharin Chatuchai	NBA	August 18, 2006	Right
23.	Marut Kongpradit	Boxing	August 25, 2006	Right
24.	Panu Traiyaweth; Siwabhorn Anothaisintawee	Young adult fiction	September 1, 2006; September 8, 2006	Right
25.	Chumpol Jangprai	Thai cuisine	September 15, 2006	Right

=== Season 8 (2007) ===
Ep.	Thai name	Topic	Airdate	Host	Result
1.	Chachavanan Santhidej	China	March 2, 2007	Tankhun Jitissara	Right
2.	Thon Peesardpanpee Apinuntavach นันทขว้าง สิรสุนทร	Manchester United F.C. #2	March 9, 2007; March 16, 2007	Ek Himsakul	Right
3.	Sorarat Jirabovornwisut	Folktales of Thailand	March 23, 2007	Phanya Nirunkul	Right
4.	วราห์ มกราภิรมย์ สมบุญ เกรียงอารีกุล	Kamen Rider Series #2	March 30, 2007; April 6, 2007	Tankhun Jitissara	Right
5.	Nakrob Moonmarsnut	Palace	April 13, 2007	Tankhun Jitissara	Right
6.	Pakamas Wangboon	Luk thung #3	April 20, 2007	Phanya Nirunkul	Right
7.	Somchai Sathanphong	Hollywood films #2	April 27, 2007	Ek Himsakul	Right
8.	Danai Nakvachara	Ganesha	May 4, 2007; May 11, 2007	Tankhun Jitissara	Right
9.	ประจวบ บุญพูล	Used car #2	May 18, 2007	Ek Himsakul	Wrong
10.	ธนัท ชัยวชิระศักดิ์ ธนเดช รักษ์ชูชีพ	Jatukham Rammathep	May 25, 2007; June 1, 2007	Ek Himsakul	Right
11.	ทิพย์วรรณ อรรถาโภชน์ (สมัยที่ 2)	Chaliang #2	June 8, 2007	Tankhun Jitissara	Wrong
12.	Somwang Patamakanthin	Seashell	June 15, 2007	Tankhun Jitissara	Right
13.	Niphawan Padungros (2nd topic 7th time champion)	Wonders of the World	June 29, 2007	Ek Himsakul	Right
14.	ธศร ยิ้มสงวน	Thommayanti	July 6, 2007	Tankhun Jitissara	Wrong
15.	ประจวบ บุญพูล (สมัยที่ 2)	Used car #3	July 13, 2007	Ek Himsakul	Right
16.	Perapong Thanakrit	Gundam	July 20, 2007	Ek Himsakul	Right
17.	คมกฤช นภาลัย	Football in Thailand #2	July 27, 2007	Ek Himsakul	Right
18.	ธนปกรณ์ สุขสาลี	Rama VI	August 3, 2007	Ek Himsakul	Right
19.	กฤตธี ภูมาศวิน	Tennis	August 10, 2007	Ek Himsakul	Right
20.	Siwabhorn Anothaisintawee (2nd topic)	Harry Potter #2	August 17, 2007	Tankhun Jitissara	Right
21.	Charinrat Bartpho (2nd topic)	Udom Taepanich	August 24, 2007	Ek Himsakul	Right
22.	Jenwit Apichainunt	Thai stamps #3	August 31, 2007	Tankhun Jitissara	Right
23.	อารัณย์ ชัยพิพัฒน์กุล (สมัยที่ 3) (อภิสฤษฎิ์ อดิศาสุรารักษ์)	WWE #3	September 7, 2007	Ek Himsakul	Right
24.	Wachara Sanguansombat	Thai birds #2	September 14, 2007	Tankhun Jitissara	Right
25.	Padipark Milindapradheep (7th time champion) (Old Name=Padipark Meesomboonpoonsuk)	Art #2	September 21, 2007	Ek Himsakul	Right
Announcing the poll vote of "Fan of the year 2007"			September 28, 2007; October 5, 2007	Tankhun Jitissara; Ek Himsakul	

=== Season 9 (2008) ===
Ep.	Thai name	Topic	Airdate	Result
1.	Tarune Liptapanlodt (Tan Lipta)	Bakery Music	February 1, 2008	Right
2.	Jakarah Simphewong	Stephen Chow	February 8, 2008	Right
3.	Amnat Puatana	Politics of Thailand #3	February 15, 2008	Right
4.	Geranun Giraboonyanon	Classic Japanese Cartoon	February 15, 2008	Right
5.	Anusorn Sribunma (3rd time champion)	Tourism in Thailand #3	February 29, 2008	Right
6.	Somchai Stanphong (2nd Topic)	Action film	March 7, 2008	Right
7.	Ton Thaprachan (Nutthapong Chawanratthanasakul)	Thai Buddha amulet	March 14, 2008; March 21, 2008	Right
8.	Benjapon Lorsunyaluk	Zoo	March 28, 2008	Right
9.	Suppayalak Kongpech (2nd time champion)	Buddhahood #2	April 4, 2008	Right
10.	Suchep Settatananont; Panya Parinyanont	Lego	April 11, 2008; April 18, 2008	Right
11.	Montee Pheongthong	Camera	April 25, 2008	Right
12.	Somrak Rumtaisong	Yodrak Salakjai	May 2, 2008; May 9, 2008	Right
13.	Phahon Sribraramee	Egypt	May 16, 2008	Right
14.	Ramase Sodarat (2nd Topic)	Thailand–United States relations	May 23, 2008	Right
15.	G.C.Narint Nakmanote (2nd Topic)	Boonchu	May 30, 2008	Right
16.	Punnawit Nantachoknetinant	Thai literature #2	June 6, 2008	Right
17.	Wiwat Chaiwatanametin	Thai herbs #2	June 13, 2008; June 20, 2008	Right
18.	Mongkongrat Oh-jaratpron	Soft drink	June 27, 2008	Right
19.	Paichet Ekjariyakron	Saint Seiya	July 4, 2008; July 11, 2008	Right
20.	Aktaphon Thirasak	Classic car	July 18, 2008; July 25, 2008	Wrong
21.	Kasiti Kamalanavin Rajawangsan (2nd topic)	Olympic Games	August 1, 2008; August 8, 2008	Right
22.	Somwang Patamakanthin (2nd time champion)	Seashell #2	August 15, 2008; August 22, 2008	Right
23.	Sumeth Sangshingchai	Classic car #2	August 29, 2008; September 12, 2008	Wrong
24.	Chachavanan Santhidej (2nd Topic)	Romance of the Three Kingdoms #3	September 19, 2008; September 26, 2008	Right
Announcing the poll vote of "Fan of the year 2008"			October 3, 2008	

=== Season 10 (2012) ===
Ep.	Thai name	Topic	Airdate	Host	Result
1	Kantawit Poriyanont	Bodyslam (band)	February 3, 2012	Krit Sripoomseth	Right
2	Nuttaphong Rotthong	Muangthong United F.C.	February 10, 2012	Krit Sripoomseth	Right
3	Sunaj Thanasanakson	Steve Jobs	February 17, 2012	Krit Sripoomseth	Right
4	Namthip Wongsawhangkit	2PM	February 24, 2012	Krit Sripoomseth	Wrong
5	Apichaya Jyuankao	Sukrit Wisetkaew	March 2, 2012	Krit Sripoomseth	Right
6	Thirapat Sornpakdee	Aed Carabao	March 9, 2012	Krit Sripoomseth	Right
7	Rapiporn Tantapirome	Hua Hin	March 16, 2012	Krit Sripoomseth	Wrong
8	Katikar Jaraensom	Boyd Kosiyabong	March 23, 2012	Krit Sripoomseth	Wrong
9	Phukijnat Kijmaneemas	Angry Birds	March 30, 2012	Krit Sripoomseth	Wrong
10	Wanwisah Sittisuanjit	Raptor (band)	April 6, 2012	Krit Sripoomseth	Right
11	Worawut Huadsuwan	Thai Airways	April 13, 2012	Krit Sripoomseth	Right
12	Thapatra Tantikanjanakul	FC Barcelona	April 20, 2012	Krit Sripoomseth	Right
13	Kittisak Thosombhati	Buddhadasa	April 27, 2012	Krit Sripoomseth	Right
14	Praisak Saisuwan	Levi Strauss & Co.	May 4, 2012	Krit Sripoomseth	Wrong
15	Thanarat Thuwasujiredt	Lady Gaga	May 11, 2012	Krit Sripoomseth	Right
16	Sombrunsak Mhongsiri	Manny Pacquiao	May 18, 2012	Krit Sripoomseth	Right
17	Chanwit Sutiprasert	Chonburi F.C.	May 25, 2012	Krit Sripoomseth	Right
18	Pakapol Potisaratana	Pixar	June 1, 2012	Krit Sripoomseth	Wrong
19	Songyokt Phongrodphoi	Wuxia	June 8, 2012	Krit Sripoomseth	Wrong
20	Thiwakron Phadnat	Michael Jackson	June 15, 2012	Krit Sripoomseth	Right
21	Jakkrit Yompayorm	Sunthorn Phu	June 22, 2012	Krit Sripoomseth	Right
22	Bhenjarat Bunthengsunk	National parks in Thailand	June 29, 2012	Krit Sripoomseth	Right
23	Prawit Santhamwuttikul	Batman	July 6, 2012	Krit Sripoomseth	Wrong
24	Manachanok Bunkeaw	Jetrin Wattanasin	July 13, 2012	Krit Sripoomseth	Right
25	Somchai Donphaiyod	Thailand women's national volleyball team	July 20, 2012	Krit Sripoomseth	Right
26	Krissana Klaibunme	World War I and World War II	July 27, 2012	Krit Sripoomseth	Right
27	Ardwarong Chanthamars	Scientist	August 3, 2012; August 10, 2012	Krit Sripoomseth	Wrong
28	Sekreakta Maliwan	Guitar	August 24, 2012	Krit Sripoomseth	Right
29	Achayasit Srisuwan	S.E.A. Write Award	August 31, 2012	Krit Sripoomseth	Right
30	Thanwarath Nawintham	Thongchai McIntyre Concerts	September 7, 2012	Krit Sripoomseth	Right
31	Tiffany Chen	President of the United States	September 14, 2012	Krit Sripoomseth	Right
32	Thanarat Jiarapanpong	Road Bike	September 21, 2012	Krit Sripoomseth	Right
33	Apichit Vivatvakin	Converse (shoe company)	September 28, 2012	Krit Sripoomseth	Wrong
34	Wit Sanart-han	Prapas Cholsaranon	October 5, 2012	Krit Sripoomseth	Right
35	Chitchanok Sanitpan	Twilight (2008 film)	October 12, 2012	Krit Sripoomseth	Wrong
36	Pimchanok Pattanasok	Detective Conan	October 19, 2012	Krit Sripoomseth	Right
37 (Special)	Sitchapatt Jiaranaiaphorn	50th Anniversary of Toyota	October 23, 2012 (Special)	Phanya Nirunkul	Right
38	Thanapon Kittisrikangwan	James Bond #2	October 26, 2012	Krit Sripoomseth	Wrong

=== Season 11 (2013) ===
Ep.	Thai name	Topic	Airdate	Host	Result
1	Tanyook Sumjinda	Joey Boy	March 8, 2013	Krit Sripoomseth	Right
2	Nirodha Ruencharoen	Academy Award #2	March 15, 2013	Krit Sripoomseth	Right
3	Keart-tisak Tittongkom	Thailand national football team	March 22, 2013	Krit Sripoomseth	Right
4	Warapong Thong-jang	Rail transport in Thailand #2	March 29, 2013	Krit Sripoomseth	Wrong
5	Worapat Mongkongwirakul	Smartphone	April 5, 2013	Krit Sripoomseth	Right
6	Chiyavat Phadhumrot	Khu Kam (Thai Novel)	April 12, 2013	Krit Sripoomseth	Disclaim
7	Natthakorn Reatinaka	Kamikaze (record label)	April 19, 2013	Krit Sripoomseth	Right
8	Katawut Khiaokrai	Khaosai Galaxy	May 3, 2013	Krit Sripoomseth	Wrong
9	Thomas Vogel	Ghost	May 10, 2013	Krit Sripoomseth	Right
10	Chotiphong Rakkao	Vietnam War	May 17, 2013	Krit Sripoomseth	Wrong
11	Natawat Krongchon	10 Last Jataka tales	May 24, 2013	Krit Sripoomseth	Right
12	Touthdanai Phathumkum	So Cool (band)	May 31, 2013	Krit Sripoomseth	Right
13	Supawan Bunreaungrodt	Roundfinger	June 7, 2013	Krit Sripoomseth	Wrong
14	Natwina Dumrongpipatsakul	Greek mythology	June 14, 2013	Krit Sripoomseth	Wrong
15	Nutrada Kultangwattana	Dog #4	June 21, 2013	Krit Sripoomseth	Right
16	Danai Nakvachara (2nd Topic)	Chiang Mai Province	June 28, 2013	Krit Sripoomseth	Wrong
17	Nitipat Wipawit	Dynasties in Chinese history	July 5, 2013	Krit Sripoomseth	Right
18	Manita Chobchuen	Female characters in Thai literature	July 12, 2013	Krit Sripoomseth	Right
19	Phukijnat Kijmaneemas (2nd Topic)	Stamp Apiwat	July 19, 2013; July 26, 2013	Krit Sripoomseth	Right
20	Kantapon Suraprasit	Fossil	August 2, 2013	Krit Sripoomseth	Right
21	Sivaporn Wongkeaitaroon	Rattanakosin Island	August 16, 2013	Krit Sripoomseth	Right
22	Pachara Choppumingsutah	Albert Einstein	August 23, 2013	Krit Sripoomseth	Wrong
23	Kristikron Sarakiti	Academy Fantasia	August 30, 2013	Krit Sripoomseth	Wrong
24	Wanthip Yingmetakul	Palmy	September 6, 2013	Krit Sripoomseth	Right
25	Pirada Techavijit	Apollo program	September 13, 2013	Krit Sripoomseth	Right
26	Wasu Kingngern	Sherlock Holmes	September 20, 2013	Krit Sripoomseth	Right
27	Supachai Nildum	ASEAN	September 27, 2013	Krit Sripoomseth	Wrong
28	Pakornchai Worajitchutiwat	Chalermchai Kositpipat	October 4, 2013; October 11, 2013	Krit Sripoomseth	Right
29	Kasuang Jarusira	Stock Exchange of Thailand #2	October 18, 2013	Krit Sripoomseth	Wrong

=== Season 12 (2014) ===
Ep.	Thai name	Topic	Airdate	Result
1	Changnarong Phonphem	Modern Dog	January 31, 2014	Right
2	Nattapong Chaiwanitphong	Japan	February 7, 2014	Right
3	Supadit Lekarat	Chinese gods	February 14, 2014	Wrong
4	Nattaphong Noplohah	Solar System	February 21, 2014	Right
5	Krit Kullsingha	Muay Thai #2	March 7, 2014	Right
6	Phonwat Chalong	Tata Young	March 14, 2014	Right
7	Wannaporn Pomthong	Cat #2	March 21, 2014	Right
8	Chaiyatouch Zophakhan	Music of Thailand #2	March 28, 2014	Wrong
9	Surachet Jariyadhimwat	Paradox (Thai band)	April 4, 2014	Right
10	Rerk Ruckchart	Mahabharata	April 11, 2014	Right
11	Thakorn Khamplub	Disney Princess	April 18, 2014	Right
12	Thananpat Nipitsakulchai	Island of Thailand	April 25, 2014	Wrong
13	Pananchai Sangtummayut	Rabbit	May 2, 2014	Wrong
14	Dr.Tosaporn Angsachonov	Soviet Union	May 9, 2014	Right
15	Nattarin Rattanapiboon	Korean War	May 16, 2014	Right
16	Panjapon Bunmaneechaikul (2nd Topic)	King Naresuan (film)	May 23, 2014	Right
17	Aphichat Treetaruyanon	Harry Potter # 3	May 30, 2014	Wrong
18	Wanchana Srichampa	World Class Football player	June 6, 2014	Right
19	Piyaporn Soontornnate	Thai Tradition	June 13, 2014	Wrong
20	Taradon Ranrin	Roman Empire	June 27, 2014	Right
21	Thirarat Pohchaishin	Arhat	July 11, 2014	Right
22	Apiwat Sunanyuenyong	Jin Yong	July 18, 2014	Right
23	Yudtana Punya	Four Reigns	July 25, 2014	Wrong
24	Warit Wasanasiri	Marvel Comics	August 1, 2014	Wrong
25	Anupong Pliwthong	ASEAN #2	August 8, 2014	Right
26	Manu Musittimanie	Fancy Carp	August 15, 2014	Wrong
27	Chalermchai Tonsingha	Tourism in Thailand #4	August 22, 2014	Right
28	Suthin Lakkhanasophakun	Pongsit Kamphee	August 29, 2014	Right

=== Season 13 (2015) ===
Ep.	Thai name	Topic	Airdate	Result
1.	Tanawat Premprecha	Buddhahood #3	April 6, 2015	Wrong
2.	Disatouch Tangpraseang (2nd Topic)	Jin Yong #2	April 13, 2015	Right
3.	Supachath Chaiporn	World Expo	May 1, 2015	Right
4.	Thanavita Dhimakul	Buddha (TV series)	May 26, 2015; May 27, 2015	Right
5.	Metikul Suanson	Manchester United F.C. #3	December 5, 2015	Right
6.	Warodome Panjamawatana	Liverpool F.C. #3	December 6, 2015	Right

=== Season 15 (2018) ===
Ep.	Thai name	Topic	Airdate	Result
Special	Kris Patanasan	Chulalongkorn University	March 1, 2018	Right
1.	Orn-nicha Anuchitchanchai	Palitchoke Ayanaputra	July 6, 2018	Right
2.	Chatchawan Chatsuwanwilai	FIFA World Cup #3	July 13, 2018	Wrong
3.	Sippothai Sribunreang	Ayodhaya	July 20, 2018	Wrong
4.	Wanchana Thanasunti	Srisaket Sor Rungvisai	July 27, 2018	Right
5.	Noparuj Moonphonganupan	ROV	August 3, 2018	Right
6.	Thisana Tanakhang	Hero Asian Games	August 10, 2018	Right
7.	Prasong Jaruratanaphong	Mun Bhuridatta	August 17, 2018	Right
8.	Patipan Tanarat	Kao Kon La Kao	August 24, 2018	Right
9.	Nutsorn ChanaThippitpibhon	Mountain	August 31, 2018	Right
10.	Kritawan Pratum	Greater East Asia War	September 7, 2018	Wrong
11.	Thirawat Chareantawisina	Museums in Thailand	September 14, 2018	Wrong
12.	Phonwat Chalong (2nd Topic)	Thailand women's national volleyball team #2	September 21, 2018	Right
13.	Naruachit Sroiphet	Che Guevara	September 28, 2018	Right
14.	Tithipant Naksitipant	BNK48	October 5, 2018; October 12, 2018	Wrong
15.	Bunthita Chantawong	GDH	October 26, 2018	Wrong
16.	Waraipan Palayanon	South Korea	November 2, 2018	Wrong
17.	Anuphong Phiothong (2nd Topic)	Famous People in Thailand	November 9, 2018	Wrong
18.	Nedenarin Jumthong	Café Amazon	November 16, 2018	Wrong
19.	Thiranat Tirawut	Phuket Province	November 23, 2018	Wrong
20.	Chiyawata Punchapatdee	Flower #2	November 30, 2018	Right
21.	Puchanok Panpaseadta	Potato (band)	December 7, 2018	Right
22.	Achitiphong Phongsupha	Mythic animals	December 14, 2018	Right
23.	Suradit Timkham	Amusement park and Water park in Thailand	December 21, 2018	Right
24.	Sekktanan Reangpraseangwit	The Rapper (TV Show)	December 28, 2018	Right

=== 2022 Specials ===
Ep.	Thai name	Topic	Airdate	Host	Result
1	อิศรา เน้นแสงธรรม	Samsung Galaxy	March 31, 2022	Puttichai Kasetsin	Right
2	Apiwat Sunanyuenyong (2nd time champion)	MAMA Noodles	August 30, 2022	Kan Kantathavorn	Right

=== Season 16 : Fandom (2023) ===
Ep.	Thai name	Topic	Airdate	Result
1.	Chinchayah Sakkawatana	Billkin & PP Krit	October 25, 2023	Right
2.	Isarapron Panya	4EVE	November 1, 2023	Right
3.	Artichat Karinkran	Paper Planes	November 8, 2023	Right
4.	Tanapon Phormcha-rhen	Miss Universe Thailand	November 15, 2023	Right
5.	Bundit Chomkulab	Pramote Pathan	November 22, 2023	Wrong
6.	Prond Songsiwilai	Ink Waruntorn	November 29, 2023	Right
7.	Sahatsawat Somsrinual	Thailand women's national volleyball team #3	December 6, 2023	Wrong
8.	Rawitsara Rahema	ATLAS (group)	December 13, 2023	Right
9.	Kulwadee Paijit	Ryan Katbundit	December 20, 2023	Right
10.	Panuphong Pumpuong	Ching Cha Sawan (TV Show)	December 27, 2023	Right
Special Fandom Unseen			January 3, 2024	

== Fan of the Year (Hard Core Fan) ==
Year	Name	Topic
2001	Vacharaphan Lavangnananda	Ultraman
2001	Ram Watcharapradit	Talisman
2002	Sommart Srisamacharn	Motorcycles
2003	Pong Suphan (Samer Ngio-Ngam)	Talisman
2004	Nirut Loharangsee	Ayutthaya Kingdom
2005	Sandy Hong	Barbie
2006	Danai Samudkochorn	Superhero
2006	Ek Himskul	FIFA World Cup 2006
2006	Luk Srigate	Buddharupa
2007	Niphawan Padungros	Wonders of the World
2007	Padipark Milindapradheep (Old Name=Padipark Meesomboonpoonsuk)	Art
2008	Ton Thaprachan (Nutthapong Chawanratthanasakul)	Thai Buddha amulet
2008	Chachavanan Santhidej	Romance of the Three Kingdoms
2012	Saklit Pollasean	Guitar
2013	Pakornchai Worajitchutiwat	Chalermchai Kositpipat
2014	Wanchana Srichampa	World class Football player
Super Fan	Aishwarda Sirilaksana	Miss Universe

== International versions ==
Fan Pan Tae has been adapted in Sweden by commercial broadcaster TV4, with the local title 'Fantasterna'. The first series aired in 2013 and was produced by Baluba, part of the Nice Entertainment Group. In early 2015, Sky One in the UK was due to air a local adaptation entitled The Fanatics. 8 x 60 minute episodes will air in primetime on Thursdays at 8pm; the series is produced by Victory Television, who have made changes to the format making each episode a competition between fans with a passion for different subjects. Known as 'The Fan' internationally, Fan Pan Tae is marketed and sold internationally by format sales company, Small World IFT.

Fanpantae side by side on the International version by Eyeworks (outside Workpoint Entertainment).

Country	Name	Host	Channel/Network	Year aired
Sweden	Fantasterna	Pär Lernström	TV4	
United Kingdom	The Fanatics	Baz Ashmawy	Sky One	

== Controversy ==
Fan Pan Tae, while popular, is repeatedly questioned about its accuracy. Internet webboard posters, such as in Pantip.com, have proven that the show was giving wrong answers on many occasions. A more serious allegation claims that the show is giving unfair advantages to famous contestants, especially those in the show business, over ordinary people who contest in the same topic (anyone can apply to play the game, regardless of their notability.) Another Workpoint's show, Tod Sa Gun Game, is also criticized for being fraudulent. However, all of these errors were corrected, and questions that were given wrong answers never aired on TV. Instead, they were scrapped and another round was played, with different questions.
