= Rungtham Pumseenil =

Thai television producer

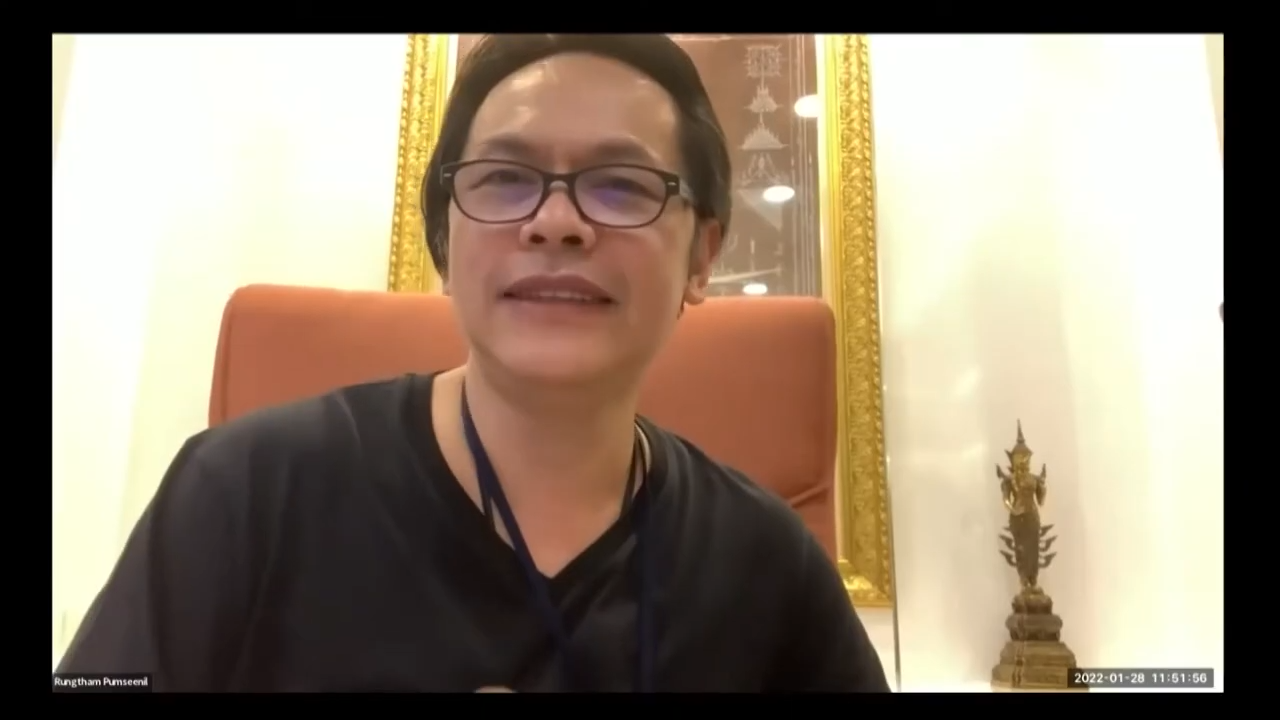
- Born: 29 October 1973 (age 52); Thailand
- Occupation: Television producer
- Spouse: Sanannat Katetrisorn (m. 2004)
- Children: Kumlungpandin and Jormkon Pumseenil

Rungtham Pumseenil (born 29 October 1973) is a Thai television producer and creative professional of game show, quiz show and reality television in Thailand. He had received many awards from local and international television awards around the world. His outstanding and well known game show is Fan Pan Tae, which gets many awards in Asia. He was worked as Vice President, Production of Workpoint Entertainment Public Company Limited. Rungtham is founder and currently Managing Director of Memiti Company Limited, joint venture with GMM One TV Company Limited, which is the joint venture company of GMM Grammy, the largest media conglomerate entertainment company in Thailand.

== Personal life ==
Rungtham "Rung" Pumseenil was born on October 29, 1973. He was graduated from The Faculty of Art (Major in Dramatics), Thammasat University, Bangkok, Thailand. He marries with Sanannat Katetrisorn and has 1 child, Jomkon.

== Career ==
Rungtham started his first job as Stage Manager at Workpoint Entertainment Public Company Limited and later was promoted to Co-Producer, Producer and later, Production Manager 1. He created Fan Pan Tae in 2000, the first game show that well known as one of the most favorite game show in Thailand, and many programs later. There were many game shows which get a lot of both high reputation and income such as Todsagun Game, the highest rating game show in Thailand history. He was served as Vice President, Production of Workpoint Entertainment Public Company Limited until 2009. He managed and gave the directions of almost game shows, quiz shows and reality televisions in the company. He also created many Thai famous game shows e.g. Black Box, One night Genius, Family Genius, Laan-Poo-Koo-Ee-Joo and SME Tee Tak. Pumseenil has produced over 2000 hours of television.

== Filmography (producer) ==
=== Game Show ===
- Family Genius (2008) TV Series (creator, exec. producer)
- Laan-Poo-Koo-Ee-Joo (2008-2010) TV Series (creator, exec. producer)
- Too Sorn Ngrn (2008) TV Series (creator, exec. producer)
- Yok Siam (2008-2010) TV Series (creator, exec. producer)
- Super Kid Game (2008) TV Series (creator, exec. producer)
- Luang Lub Tub Tak (2009-2010) TV Series (creator, exec. producer)
- Classroom Genius (2009) TV Series (creator, exec. producer)
- Khon Geng Pa-Sa Thai (2009) TV Series (creator, exec. producer)
- SME Tee-Tak (2010-2011) TV Series (creator)
- Honeymoon Fight (2010-2011) TV Series (creator, exec. producer)
- 5 Maha Ni Yom (2011) TV Series (creator, exec. producer)
- Wittaya Supprayuth (2011–2012) TV Series (creator)
- Unbelievable Game (2011) TV Series (creator, exec. producer)
- Gang Gra Jid Kid Dai Jai (2012) TV Series (creator, exec. producer)
- Family Million (Krob Krua Ratuek Laan) (2013) TV Series (creator, exec. producer)
- Gang Game (Guan Kuek Ratuek Laan) (2013) TV Series (creator, exec. producer)
- Sup'Tar Party Celebrity Game Night (2014–present) TV Series (exec. producer)
- The Car Jackpot Game (Game Jaek Geng) (2015) TV Series (creator, exec. producer)
- Suek Wan Duan Pleng (Song Battle Day) (2015–present) TV Series (creator, exec. producer)
- Dara Mahachon (2016) TV Series (creator, exec. producer)
- Suek Wan Duan Pleng: Song Kram Champ (Song Battle Day: War of Champions) (2016–present) TV Series (creator, exec. producer)
- Sabaan Wa Pood Jing (To Tell The Truth) (2016–present) TV Series (exec. producer)
- Stage Fighter (2016–present) TV Series (creator, exec. producer)
- Suek Wan Duan Pleng Dek (Song Battle Day: Children Edition) (2017–present) TV Series (creator, exec. producer)
- Suek Wan Duan Pleng: Sao 5 (Song Battle Day: The Big 5) (2017–present) TV Series (creator, exec. producer)

=== Quiz Show ===
- Fan Pan Tae (2000-2008) TV Series (exec. producer)
- Todsagun Game (2002-2008) TV Series (exec. producer)
- Todsagun Kid Game (2003-2007) TV Series (creator, exec. producer)
- Black Box (2004-2007) TV Series (creator, exec. producer)

=== Reality television ===
- One night Genius (2006-2008) TV Series (creator, exec. producer)
- Fight for Mom: Backpack (2007-2008) TV Series (exec. producer)
- Game Neramitr (2011) TV Series (creator, exec. producer)
- Elle 20 (2014) TV Series (creator, exec. producer)
- Dream Up Nub 1 Hai Theung Fun (2015–present) TV Series (creator, exec. producer)
- Suer Tid Peek (Pitching Tiger) (2016) TV Series (creator, exec. producer)
- Rong Hai Rod (Survivor Singer) (2017) TV Series (creator, exec. producer)
- Top Chef Thailand (2017–present) TV Series (exec. producer)

=== Variety ===
- Made in Thailand (2012) TV Series (creator, exec. producer)
- School Bus LLPD (2012–2013) TV Series (exec. producer)
- The Red Carpet (2014–present) TV Series (creator, exec. producer)
- Ngan Wad Festival (2015–present) TV Series (creator, exec. producer)

== Awards and accolades ==
Asian Television Awards

- 2001: Runner-up Best Game or Quiz program: Fan Pan Tae
- 2003: Winner Best Game or Quiz program: Fan Pan Tae
- 2003: Runner-up Best Game or Quiz program: Todsagun Game
- 2004: Winner Best Game or Quiz program: Fan Pan Tae
- 2004: Runner-up Best Game or Quiz program: Todsagun Kid Game
- 2005: Winner Best Game or Quiz program: Black Box
- 2005: Runner-up Best Game or Quiz program: Fan Pan Tae
- 2005: Highly Commended Best Game or Quiz program: Todsagun Game
- 2006: Winner Best Children program: Todsagun Kid Game
- 2006: Highly Commended Best Game or Quiz program: Black Box
- 2006: Highly Commended Best Game or Quiz program: Fan Pan Tae
- 2006: Highly Commended Best Game or Quiz program: One Night Genius
- 2007: Winner Best Children program: Todsagun Kid Game
- 2007: Runner-up Best Game or Quiz program: Black Box
- 2007: Runner-up Best Game or Quiz program: Fan Pan Tae
- 2007: Highly Commended Best Game or Quiz program: Fight for Mom: Backpack
- 2008: Winner Best Children program: Lan Pu Ku Ee Joo
- 2008: Highly Commended Best Game or Quiz program: Fan Pan Tae
- 2008: Highly Commended Best Game or Quiz program: Yok Siam
- 2009: Winner Best Children program: Super Kid Game
- 2009: Highly Commended Best Game or Quiz program: Classroom Genius
- 2009: Highly Commended Best Game or Quiz program: Lharn Phoo Koo E-Joo

Mekalha Award

- 2001: Best Game Show: Fan Pan Tae
- 2002: Best Game Show: Fan Pan Tae
- 2004: Best Game Show: Fan Pan Tae
- 2004: Best Kids Program: Todsagun Kid Game

Golden Television Award

- 2001: Best Game Show: Fan Pan Tae
- 2004: Best Game Show: Todsagun Game
- 2005: Best Game Show: Black Box
- 2008: Best Game Show: Yok Siam

Star Entertainment Awards

- 2001: Best Game Show: Fan Pan Tae
- 2003: Best Game Show: Fan Pan Tae
- 2004: Best Game Show: Fan Pan Tae
- 2005: Best Game Show: Fan Pan Tae

Top Awards

- 2001: Best Game Show: Fan Pan Tae
- 2002: Best Game Show: Fan Pan Tae
- 2003: Best Game Show: Fan Pan Tae
- 2005: Best Game Show: Fan Pan Tae
- 2006: Best Game Show: One Night Genius

Hamburger Awards

- 2006-7: Best Entertainment Program: One Night Genius
