= Pantip.com =

Thai web forum

Pantip

- Website type: Forum
- Available in: Thai
- Owners: Internet Marketing Co., Ltd.
- Creator: Wanchat Phdungrat
- Website: www.pantip.com
- Commercial: Yes
- Registration: Required
- Launched: October 7, 1996
- Current status: Active

Pantip.com is a popular Thai-language website and discussion forum. As of July 2016, Pantip.com one of the top 10 websites in Thailand and 712 worldwide.

Discussions about Thai politics and current events on Pantip.com's topic boards are often cited in the Thai press, particularly in such English-language newspapers as the Bangkok Post and The Nation, as a gauge of the public's mood about various issues. At the beginning, the site gained its popularity from people's misunderstanding of its name which is similar (and identical in English) to Bangkok's former IT shopping center, Pantip Plaza, but it is in no way affiliated with the mall. (The name is actually styled in Thai as พันทิป, meaning a thousand tips.)

== History ==
Pantip.com was founded on October 7, 1996 by Wanchat Padungrat, an electronics engineer graduating from KMITL. He holds directorship and ownership of the site. Along with the popular Thai-language portal Sanook.com, Pantip.com was one of the first websites established in Thailand when the Internet was being introduced in the country. As opposed to Sanook.com's lucrative buyout from MWeb, a now-defunct dot com company, Wanchat has no plans to sell the site.

== Community ==
=== Tables ===
One of the features of the site is the "Café", which consists of 20 "tables" for discussions on a variety of topics. The tables are named after famous places in Thailand, such as Siam Square, MBK Center, Silom and Chatuchak Weekend Market. Topics for discussion include politics, religion, celebrities and education as well as films, sports and outdoor recreation.

Other features include LiveChat, Pantip Market, PanTown, Game Room, E-Card, BlogGang and Pantip Musicstation.

=== Membership system ===
Pantip.com believes that its members should be held accountable for what they write on its webboard in order to avoid unpleasant exchanges that often bring about defamation, rudeness, or simply unhealthy cyber environment for its members. Thus, since 2004 it has started requiring that new members must provide their IDs (Thai National ID or passport number) in order to subscribe for a membership. At first, this measure had received a lot of criticism, with concerns about privacy and security of personal information. However, such criticisms have subsided as there has been no indication of any harm yet. Apparently, Pantip.com is one of the few, if any, online webboards that have such stiff requirements involving personal identity of the member. According to Wanchat, the outcome of such measure is quite satisfying, the members are contented with the improved quality of the discussion and the membership has grown.

Alternatively, people who do not wish to apply as a member can still post using a temporary ticket-pass that only requires an e-mail address. Ticket-pass holders do not enjoy some special benefits of members, such as intra-communication tools and blog.

Recently, in Ratchadumnern table, where heated and uncivil political debates often occur, Pantip.com has started requiring that every post there must be accompanied by member login only. Thus, everyone who wishes to post in Ratchadumnern table must have member login name. However, the problem of using false identification or IDs of other people to apply for membership is still pervasive.

=== Netiquette ===
The forum has rules, or "netiquette", which are actively enforced. Offensive posts can be reported to the webmaster, who may remove the offending post to the "trash" page, where the pages can still be viewed and commented on. The rules are:

1. Messages critical of the king and the royal family are absolutely prohibited.
2. No foul language or sexually explicit content.
3. No insults or posts that may cause a person to be hated.
4. No posts that are solely intended to cause quarrels or chaos.
5. No negative attacks on religions or the teachings of any religion.
6. Don't use pseudonyms that resemble somebody else's real name with the intention of misleading others.
7. No messages that might cause conflicts among educational institutions.
8. No posts containing personal data of others, e-mail addresses or telephone numbers.

=== Famous members ===
There are people from all walks of life who participate in Pantip.com as members, ticket pass-holders, or just readers. Among them are many famous people in Thai society who publicly acknowledge their membership in Pantip.com. They include:

- Police Colonel Yannapol Youngyuen – Commander, the Bureau of Technology and Cyber Crime, Department Special Investigation (DSI)
- M.C. Chatrichalerm Yukol – film director, screenwriter and producer
- Khunying Winita Dithiyon (Wor Winichaikul) – prolific novelist and academic
- Chiranan Pitpreecha – poet, writer, translator, S.E.A. Write Award winner
- Saran Maitreewech (Dang Trin) – best-selling writer on Buddhist themes
- Sombat Boonngamanong (Bor Kor Lai Chud) – NGO activist, founder of Mirror Art Group, Bannok.com
- Kanok Ratwongsakul – news anchorman
- Maj-Gen Kittisak Ratprasert – former chief aide-de-camp to King Bhumibol Adulyadej, politician

Some people have found fame after they became involved on Pantip.com's boards and have nurtured their reputations authorities on writing, art, photography, pet ownership and various other topics. Several posters have landed book deals as a consequence of writing on Pantip.com.

On the other hand, a lot of people have become infamous when their blunders were exposed. Examples include writers who plagiarize the works of others, famous quiz shows such as Fan Pan Tae and Tod Sa Gun Game which give wrong answers repeatedly, and unscrupulous companies that cheat customers or individuals who use Pantip.com strictly for self-promotion.

While Pantip.com members have different views ideologies, sometimes they will come together to protect fellow members whom they think are unfairly attacked from outsiders. The most prominent example is a careless teenager who inadvertently posted a nude picture of a Thai actress (although he covered her breasts before posting) which landed him in a police station's cell. The whole Chalermthai movie and entertainment board, where the picture was posted, banded together to defend the poster whom they think was just a scapegoat in a plot to raise publicity for the actress' next movie. The actress and her company was heavily criticized and there were a collective threat not to see any of her future movies. Finally after the poster made a public apology, she dropped the case and he was set free.
