= Chaliang =

Chaliang may refer to:

From the Thai word เฉลียง (pronounced [tɕʰà.lǐaŋ], with rising tone):

- Chaliang (band), a Thai band
- Chaliang subdistrict, a tambon in Khon Buri district, Nakhon Ratchasima province

From the Thai word เชลียง (pronounced [tɕʰá.līaŋ], with middle tone):

- Mueang Chaliang, an ancient city and historical polity in Thailand
- Chaliang ceramics, a kind of ceramic ware historically produced in Mueang Chaliang, the precursor to Sangkhalok ceramic ware
