= Yok Siam =

- Also known as: ยกสยาม
- Genre: Quiz show
- Presented by: Panya Nirankul
- Country of origin: Thailand
- Original language: Thai
- No. of seasons: 4

Production
- Running time: 30 minutes
- Production company: Workpoint Entertainment

Original release
- Network: Modern Nine TV
- Release: 18 February 2008 – 28 February 2011

Yok Siam (Thai: ยกสยาม) was a Thai quiz show television program produced by Workpoint Entertainment. The show encouraged contestants from each of the provinces of Thailand to utilize their knowledge regarding local history, culture, and geography to promote local pride. It was broadcast from Monday to Friday between 6:01 p.m. and 6:30 p.m. on Modern Nine TV. The program premiered on 18 February 2008 and concluded its run on 28 February 2011.

In addition, Maha Vajiralongkorn, then the Crown Prince of Thailand, provided signed certificates to the winning provinces of the competition.

== Seasons ==
The program updated its formatting over its four-year run, including structural updates to how provinces competed and alterations to the total question pool limits:

- Yok Siam Year 1 (18 February 2008 – 9 January 2009) – Group winners included Prachinburi, Sisaket, Yasothon, Nakhon Ratchasima, Phetchaburi, Ang Thong, Chanthaburi, Nong Khai, Chiang Rai, Kanchanaburi, Nonthaburi, Yala, Samut Prakan, Sukhothai, Mae Hong Son, Ranong, and Chumphon. The overall season champion was Ranong.
- Yok Siam Year 2 (12 January 2009 – 3 February 2010) – Featured winners and runners-up across the different regions, including Trat, Chanthaburi, Chiang Rai, Sukhothai, Phatthalung, Songkhla, Khon Kaen, Nakhon Ratchasima, Nonthaburi, and Nakhon Nayok. The overall season champion was Nonthaburi.
- Yok Siam 100 (1 March – 2 June 2010) – Shifted formatting to focus on players accumulating points across a 100-question pool threshold.
- Yok Siam 10 (3 June 2010 – 28 February 2011) – Restructured to scale back constraints down to a high-stakes 10-question gauntlet for the jackpot prize.
