= Wittaya Subphayuth =

- Genre: Educational game show
- Presented by: Nattee Kosolpisit
- Country of origin: Thailand
- Original language: Thai
- No. of seasons: 2

Production
- Production company: Workpoint Entertainment

Original release
- Network: Channel 5
- Release: 5 March 2011 – 23 February 2013

Wittaya Subphayuth (also spelled Vittaya, Thai: วิทยสัประยุทธ์, RTGS: Witthayasapprayut, pronounced [wít.tʰa.yá.sàp.pra.yút]) is a Thai educational game show initiated and sponsored by the Institute for the Promotion of Teaching Science and Technology (IPST) and produced by Workpoint Entertainment under the vision and direction of IPST. The programme features competitions between upper-secondary school students to create a machine to perform various tasks. It was broadcast weekly on Channel 5, for two seasons, from 2011 to 2013.

== Production ==
Wittaya Subphayuth is produced by Workpoint Entertainment in cooperation with its main sponsor, the Thai Ministry of Education's Institute for the Promotion of Teaching Science and Technology (IPST). The programme's stated objectives include to promote science education and to publicize the scientific potential of Thai students. It was broadcast weekly on Saturdays at 18:00 on Channel 5, beginning on 5 March 2011. It was shown for two seasons, the last episode being broadcast on 23 February 2013.

== Format ==
The programme features upper-secondary student representatives from forty-eight schools countrywide, in teams of three, competing in single-elimination tournaments. Each episode consists of a match between two schools, whose teams are assigned to design and build a machine to complete a specific task, sometimes in Rube Goldberg fashion. For example, the problem for the episode broadcast on 27 August 2011 was to determine the weight of a tuk-tuk using a regular market weighing scale.

The programme is presented by Nattee Kosolpisit. Each episode consists of four sections: two showing each team's construction of the machine, one showing the competitors' presentations of their machines' concepts, and one showing actual application of the machines. The teams are scored depending on their success in completing the task, as well as by audience votes and by a panel of three or four judges, depending on the round. The two regular judges are Surachate Limkumnerd and Worawarong Rakreungdet, physicists at Chulalongkorn University and King Mongkut's University of Technology Thonburi, respectively.

== Reception and results ==
Wittaya Subphayuth won the Best Game or Quiz Programme category in the 2011 Asian Television Awards, beating India Minute to Win It Season 1 (Episode 2) and Workpoint's other nominee Ratcharod Ma Koey. It also won Thailand's Golden Television Award in the general educational programme category.

The first season, which concluded on 10 March 2012, was won by students from the Prince Royal's College, Chiang Mai.
