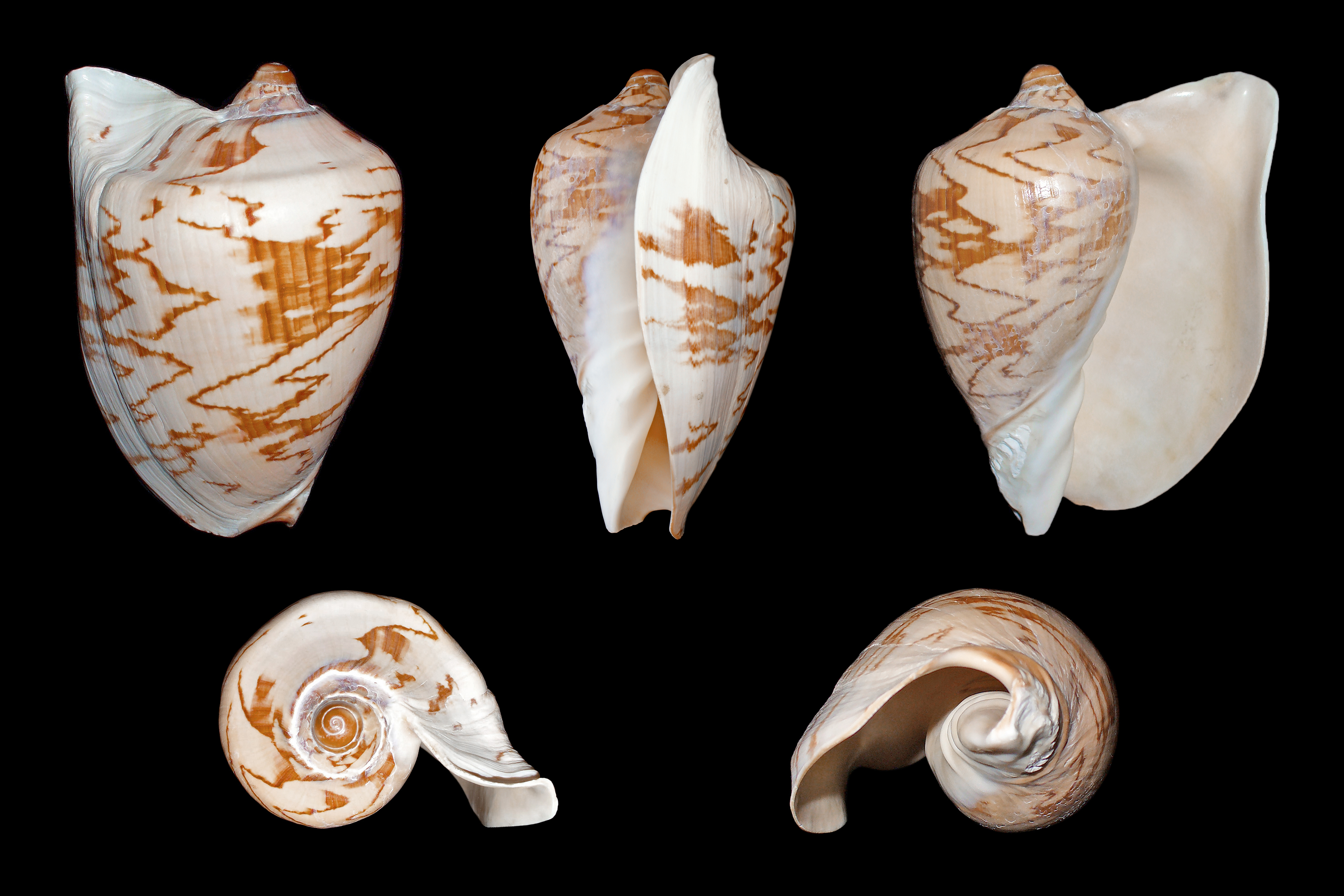
- Five views of a shell of Cymbiola nobilis

Scientific classification
- Kingdom: Animalia
- Phylum: Mollusca
- Class: Gastropoda
- Subclass: Caenogastropoda
- Order: Neogastropoda
- Family: Volutidae
- Genus: Cymbiola
- Species: C. nobilis

Binomial name
- Cymbiola nobilis (Lightfoot, 1786)

Synonyms
- Aulica scapha (Gmelin, 1791) ·; Cymbiola (Cymbiola) nobilis (Lightfoot, 1786); Voluta (Aulica) scapha Gmelin, 1791; Voluta fasciata Schubert & Wagner, 1829; Voluta nobilis [Lightfoot], 1786 (original combination); Voluta scapha Gmelin, 1791

= Cymbiola nobilis =

Species of gastropod

Cymbiola nobilis, the noble volute, is a species of sea snail, a marine gastropod mollusk in the family Volutidae, the volutes.

The snail's shell is commonly collected in the sea shell trade, which has resulted in overharvesting of the snail.

== Taxonomy and naming ==
The snail is a member of the phylum Mollusca, the class Gastropoda, the family Volutidae, and the genus Cymbiola. It was first discovered in 1786.

== Subspecies ==
- Cymbiola (Cymbiola) nobilis nobilis (Lightfoot, 1786)
- † Cymbiola nobilis ponderosa (K. Martin, 1895)
- Cymbiola (Cymbiola) nobilis tamariskae (Sutanto & Patamakanthin, 2004)

== Distribution ==
Cymbiola nobilis is widespread in Asia from Taiwan to Vietnam, peninsular Malaysia, Indonesia, Singapore and Philippines.

== Description ==
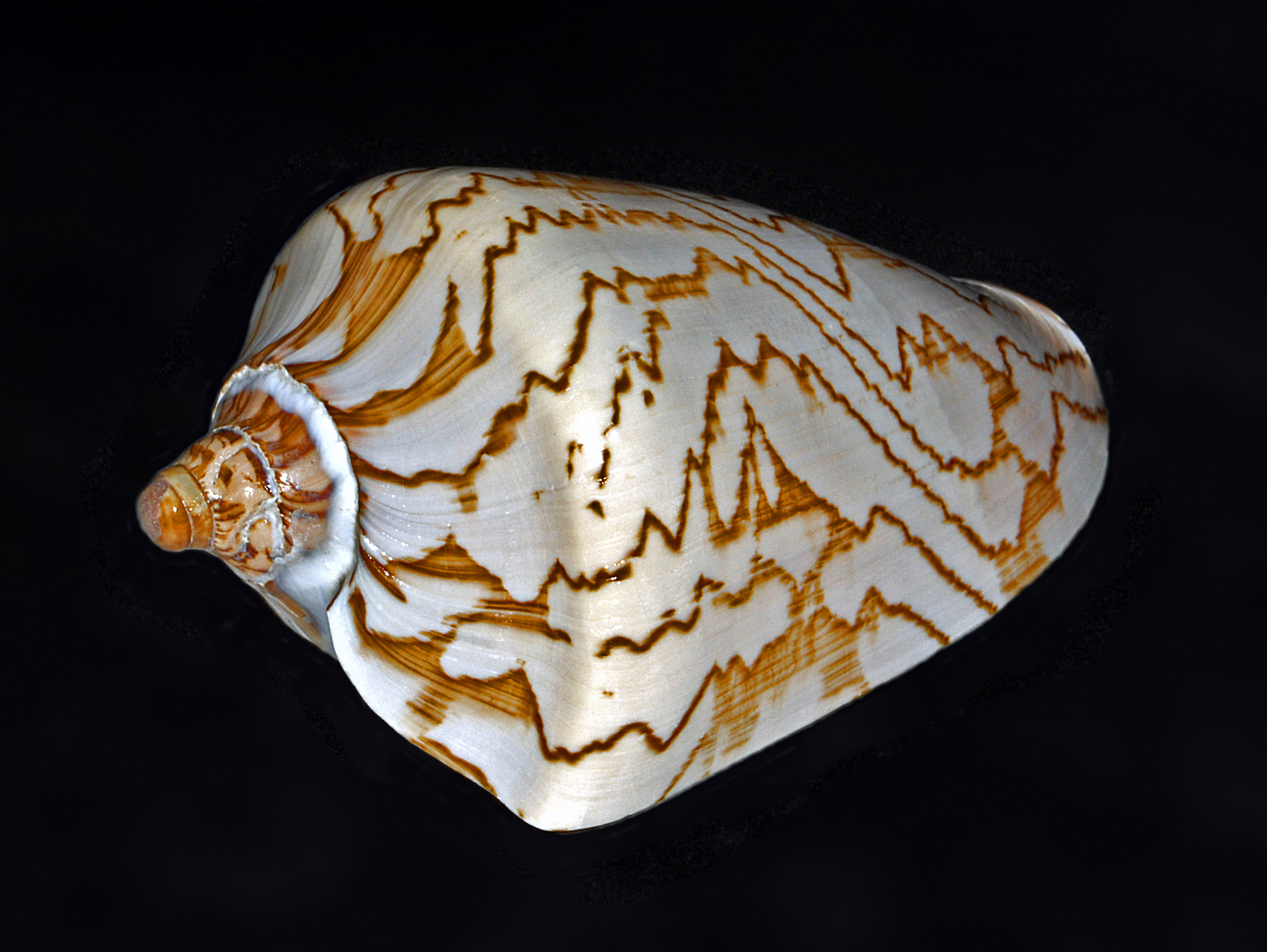
A shell of Cymbiola nobilis

Shells of Cymbiola nobilis can reach a length of 50–222 millimetres (2.0–8.7 in), with an average size of six centimeters. Females tend to be larger than the males.

These fairy large, thick and heavy shells are glossy, with plaits on the columella. They have a wide variety of patterns. The shell colour may be beige, orange or yellow with a zig-zag red or brown pattern. Sometimes these shells are completely black. The fleshy body of the snail is black with bright yellow or orange spots.

Pigment producing cells infect nearby cells so that they also produce pigment. Cells that are infected once become immune to producing pigment again. As a result, the coloring of the snail's shell forms the characteristic pattern.

== Habitat ==
This species lives in a marine environment and can be found on sandy reef flats and sandy areas near coral rubble and seagrasses.

Populations of Cymbiola nobilis are present in small and isolated areas and are often close by, but separated by geographic barriers such as water channels. Each separate range has its own shell form and color pattern.

== Conservation status ==
The snail is considered vulnerable. The number of Cymbiola nobilis has been greatly reduced by reef destruction and collection as food and for the marine curio and shell trade. The snail was once commonly found in reefs around Singapore, but they have become much scarcer. The government of Singapore has stated that laws are needed to restrict the collection of wildlife fauna such as Cymbiola nobilis.

== Behavior ==
=== Reproduction ===
The snails are to a certain extent hermaphrodites, but separate sexes exist, and the snails reproduce through sexual reproduction. The female is fertilized by the male internally, and the female responds by depositing fertilized eggs. The egg capsules laid by the female contain multiple embryos. It takes about seven days for the eggs to hatch into larvae. Embryos develop into free-swimming planktonic marine larvae (trochophore) and later into juvenile veligers. Altogether, the snail goes through eight stages of development before becoming a full-fledged snail.

=== Diet ===
The C. nobilis is carnivorous, and preys on small animals such as bivalves, other mollusks and echinoderms.

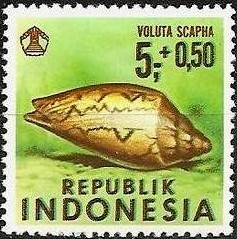
Cymbiola nobilis on a 1969 Indonesia postage stamp.

== Bibliography ==
- Lightfoot, J. (1786). A Catalogue of the Portland Museum, lately the property of the Dutchess Dowager of Portland, deceased; which will be sold by auction by Mr. Skinner & Co. on Monday the 24th of April, 1786, and the thirty-seven following days, Skinner & Co., London
- Bail, P. & Limpus, A. 1998. Revision of Cymbiola (Cymbiolacca) from eastern Australia. The "pulchra complex". Evolver:Rome
- Poppe, G.T. & Goto, Y. 1992. Volutes Mostra Mondiale: Cupra Marittima, Italy
- Weaver, C.S. & du Pont, J.E. 1970. The Living Volutes. Delaware Museum of Natural History:Greenville, Delaware.
