= Ryan Katbundit =

- ไรอัล กาจบัณฑิต
- Born: Katbundit Champasilp; 24 January 2003 (age 22); Bang Kapi district, Bangkok, Thailand
- Education: Chantrakasem Rajabhat University
- Occupation: Singer
- Musical career
- Genres: Luk thung; T-Pop
- Years active: 2022–present
- Labels: Yoongkao Record (Workpoint Entertainment)

Katbundit Champasilp (Thai: กาจบัณฑิต จำปาศิลป์; born 24 January 2003), known mononymously as Ryan Katbundit (Thai: ไรอัล กาจบัณฑิต, pronounced [raj ʔan kàːt ban tʰít]), is a Thai luk thung singer from Bangkok in 21st century. He first appeared on the TV stage contest Mai Mod Nee which on air by Workpoint Entertainment. He has released nine singles with a subsidiary record label of Workpoint Entertainment, Yoongkao Record, that focuses of new generation electronic Luk thung in 2020s.

== Early life and musical career ==
He was born into middle-class family in Bang Kapi district, Bangkok. His father was interested about Luk thung song and he has one younger brother.

He started to contest on the many stage since he was 13 years, and he earnest with contest when his mother was unemployed during COVID-19 pandemic in Thailand. In 2020, he attended to contest in Chumthang Daothong which on air by Channel 7, but he was lost. In 2021, he attended to contest in Dual Phleng Ching Thun which on air by One 31, but he was only 6th time to champion of this contest. He started to popular after he attended to contest in Mai Mod Nee, with his pleasure voice and his handsomeness are made many fans to followed him. He can keep champion in Mai Mod Nee with 200th times, which received public criticism to the commentators in that contest about transparency in judging. However, he continues to gain popular by his fans.

He recorded first single The Past Love at Kong Fang (รักเก่าข้างกองฟาง), original by Chatchai Chatchawarn, and released on every digital media in July 2022. After that two months, he recorded second single We Love Luk Thung (ฉันรักเพลงลูกทุ่ง), written by Praphas Cholsalanon. He also released another single include My Daring on My Wallpapaer (แรงใจหน้าจอ), End the Sadness With Me (หยุดเสียใจไว้ที่ฉัน), Solve I With Heart Subject (ติด ร. วิชาหัวใจ), etc.

=== Personal life ===
He ever to be overweight, with weighing nearly 117 kg. So, he had to go on a diet and exercise for a year to lose weight. He still single, and he studying at Chantrakasem Rajabhat University.

He also knows by epithet Luk Chai Haeng Chat (Thai: ลูกชายแห่งชาติ, meaning "the son of nation"), paired with Am Chonthicha who received the epithet Luk Sao Haeng Chart (Thai: ลูกสาวแห่งชาติ, meaning "the daughter of nation").

== Discography ==
=== Singles ===
Year	Title	Label
2022	"The Past Love at Kong Fang" (Original by Chatchai Chatchawarn)	Yoongkao Record
2022	We Love Luk Thung (ฉันรักเพลงลูกทุ่ง)	Yoongkao Record
2022	My Daring on My Wallpapaer (แรงใจหน้าจอ)	Yoongkao Record
2022	The Lucky Luk Thung (ลูกทุ่งเลขท้าย) (Feat. Sun Wongsathorn and Form Chonphiphat)	Yoongkao Record
2023	End the Sadness With Me (หยุดเสียใจไว้ที่ฉัน)	Yoongkao Record
2023	Solve I With Heart Subject (ติด ร. วิชาหัวใจ)	Yoongkao Record
2023	Lucky! Hurrah! (รวยๆ ปังๆ)	Yoongkao Record
2023	Shock Feels (ช็อตฟีล)	Yoongkao Record
2023	To My Supporters (แด่ลมใต้ปีก)	Yoongkao Record

== See also ==
- Am Chonthicha, Thai luk thung singer in 21st century from Isan area.
- Biw Jitchareeya, Thai luk thung-mor lam sing singer in 21st century.
- Packky Sakonnaree, Thai luk thung singer in 21st century from Isan area.
