= Cymbiola nobilis tamariskae =

Scientific classification
- Kingdom: Animalia
- Phylum: Mollusca
- Class: Gastropoda
- Subclass: Caenogastropoda
- Order: Neogastropoda
- Family: Volutidae
- Genus: Cymbiola
- Species: C. nobilis
- Subspecies: C. n. tamariskae

Trinomial name
- Cymbiola nobilis tamariskae Sutanto & Patamakanthin, 2004

Synonyms
- Cymbiola (Cymbiola) nobilis tamariskae Sutanto & Patamakanthin, 2004· accepted, alternate representation; Cymbiola tamariskae Sutanto & Patamakanthin, 2004

Species of gastropod

Cymbiola nobilis tamariskae is a subspecies of sea snail, a marine gastropod mollusk in the family Volutidae, the volutes.

== Distribution ==
This subspecies occurs in the Java Sea.
