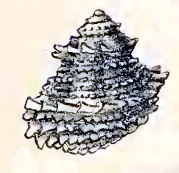
- Drawing with an abapertural view of a shell of Turbo tursicus

Scientific classification
- Kingdom: Animalia
- Phylum: Mollusca
- Class: Gastropoda
- Subclass: Vetigastropoda
- Order: Trochida
- Family: Turbinidae
- Genus: Turbo
- Species: T. tursicus

Binomial name
- Turbo tursicus (Reeve, 1843)

Synonyms
- Turbo somnueki Patamakanthin, 2001

= Turbo tursicus =

Species of gastropod

Turbo tursicus is a species of sea snail, a marine gastropod mollusk in the family Turbinidae, the turban snails.

== Description ==
The shell grows to a length of 20 mm. The imperforated shell is somewhat pyramidally ovate. The sutures of the spire are excavated. The whorls are spirally squamately ridged, slanting around the upper part, sharply angled, erectly squamate at the angle. The aperture is small.

This species is well characterized by its style of painting. It is whitish with broad scarlet rays, particularly distinct on the sloping upper surfaces of the whorls. These are sometimes edged with black posteriorly, and the suture is more or less stained with that color. The lower part of the body whorl is for the most part scarlet with a few narrow white streaks (sometimes black-spotted) radiating from the umbilical region. The operculum is white, thick, convex, and granose externally.

== Distribution ==
This marine species occurs in the Indian Ocean off East Africa and the Seychelles; off the Andaman Islands, Thailand and the Philippines.
