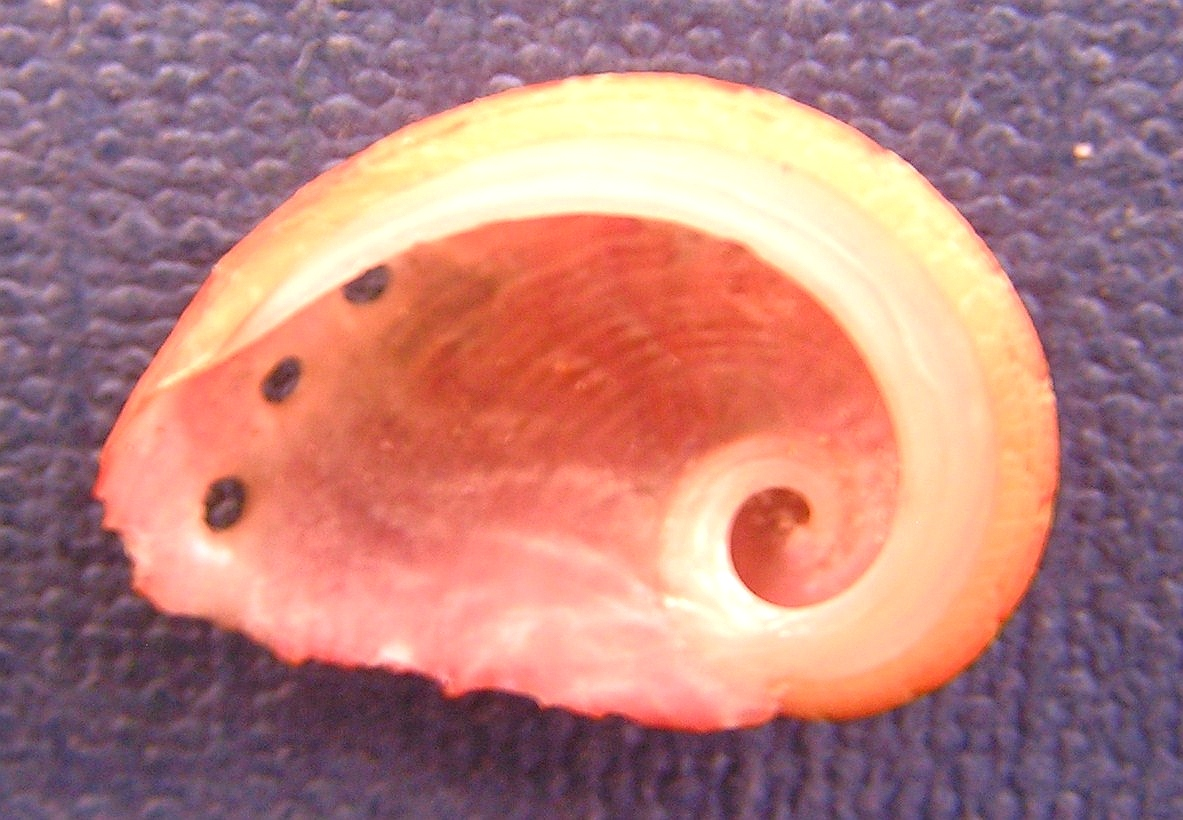
- Haliotis thailandis

Scientific classification
- Kingdom: Animalia
- Phylum: Mollusca
- Class: Gastropoda
- Subclass: Vetigastropoda
- Order: Lepetellida
- Family: Haliotidae
- Genus: Haliotis
- Species: H. thailandis

Binomial name
- Haliotis thailandis Dekker & Pakamanthin, 2001

= Haliotis thailandis =

Species of gastropod

Haliotis thailandis is a species of sea snail, a marine gastropod mollusk in the family Haliotidae, the abalone.

== Distribution ==
This species has been found in the Andaman Sea and the seas around the Philippines
