= Chaliang (band) =

Thai pop band

Chaliang เฉลียง
- Origin: Thailand
- Genres: Pop; Pop-jazz; Swing; Folk; Orchestra
- Years active: 1982; 1986–1991; 1994–present
- Labels: JSL; Creatia Artists; Kita Records; Workpoint Entertainment
- Members: Watchara Pan-iam (Jeab); Nitipong Hornak (Dee); Kiattisak Wethewutthajarn (Kiang); Pusit Laithong (Taeng); Su Boonliang (Jui)
- Past members: Somchai Sakdikul (Somlek); Chatchai Duriyapraneet (Nok)
- Website: www.chaliang.com

Chaliang (Thai: เฉลียง) is a Thai pop band that debuted in 1982. formed by Prapas Cholsaranon, They are considered to be one of the first bands to pioneer of new musical styles, both in terms of content and melodies, for the Thai pop music industry. They were called "a group of good-humored notes" and "the prototype of Thailand's first boy band".

Prapas founded the band with his close friend Watchara Pan-iam and Nitipong Hornak. Chaliang named their band after its origin at the Faculty of Architecture, Chulalongkorn University, where they were studying. They released their first album in 1982, produced by Rewat Buddhinan, and Somchai Sakdikul as the lead vocalist before the band initially disbanded around 1982.

In 1986, Chaliang reunited and shifted to a pop, semi-boy band style. after gaining new members Su Boonliang, Kiattisak Wethewutthajarn, and Pusit Laithong, they were their friends and juniors from Chulalongkorn University. They released three albums, with most of the songs written by Prapas.

Nitipong and Su left the band in 1988. Prapas invited Chatchai Duriyapraneet to join the band in 1989, and they switched their music style towards Folk music. They released two albums, and once again disbanded in 1991.

In 1994, the band members reunited for a concert to celebrate Chaliang's 10th anniversary. Since 1994, they continued to reunite occasionally to release special projects and perform live concerts.

Chaliang's songs have been adapted into a jukebox musical stage play in 2009, 2016, 2017 and 2024.

== Background ==
The band's name relates to its origin at Faculty of Architecture, Chulalongkorn University, where a group of students founded Chaliang in 1982. Prapas Cholsaranon, the founder wanted a band name that would communicate the human being, the home, the mind, and wanted to communicate the middle that is between the outside and the inside (the mind). So he thought of the name Chaliang (Thai: เฉลียง; English: Veranda), which is the part that connects the outside with the inside of the house. In addition, the name Chaliang has a sound similar to "slanting" (เฉียง), not very straight, reflecting an image, but not a reflection of society. It reflects the mind.

== Band members ==
Current

- Watchara Pan-iam (Jeab) (Thai: วัชระ ปานเอี่ยม; RTGS: Watchara Pan-iam) (1982, 1986–1991, 1994–present)
- Nitipong Hornak (Dee) (Thai: นิติพงษ์ ห่อนาค; RTGS: Nitipong Hornak) (1982, 1986–1988, 1994–present)
- Kiattisak Wethewutthajarn (Kiang) (Thai: เกียรติศักดิ์ เวทีวุฒาจารย์; RTGS: Kiattisak Wethewutthajarn) (1986–1991, 1994–present)
- Pusit Laithong (Taeng) (Thai: ภูษิต ไล้ทอง; RTGS: Pusit Laithong) (1986–1991, 1994–present)
- Su Boonliang (Jui) (Thai: ศุ บุญเลี้ยง; RTGS: Su Boonliang) (1986–1988, 1994–present)

Past

- Somchai Sakdikul (Somlek) (Thai: สมชาย ศักดิกุล; RTGS: Somchai Sakdikul) (1982; guest 1994, 2000)
- Chatchai Duriyapraneet (Nok) (Thai: ฉัตรชัย ดุริยประณีต; RTGS: Chatchai Duriyapraneet) (1989–1991, 1994–2023)

Timeline

== Discography ==
Studio albums

- ปรากฏการณ์ฝน (1982)
- อื่น ๆ อีกมากมาย (1986)
- เอกเขนก (1987)
- เฉลียงหลังบ้าน (1987)
- แบ-กบาล (1989)
- ตะไคร่น้ำสุดขอบฟ้า (1990)

Special albums

- นอกชาน (2000)

Special singles

- "เธอหมุนรอบฉัน ฉันหมุนรอบเธอ" (2007)
- "เข้าใจว่าไม่เข้าใจ" (2016)
- "คนแปลกหน้า" (2016)
- "ไม่นานนี้เอง" (2016)
- "ยังคงเอกเขนก" (2023)
- "วิธีเล็ก ๆ ที่จะบอกรัก" (2025)

Collaborations albums

- น้ำคือชีวิต (with Carabao, Modern Dog) (2006)

== Concerts ==
=== Main Host ===
| Year | Title | City | Country | Ref. |
|---|---|---|---|---|
| 1986 | คอนเสิร์ตปิดอัลบั้ม อื่น ๆ อีกมากมาย | Bangkok | Thailand | |
| 1987 | คอนเสิร์ตเอกเขนกกับเฉลียง | Bangkok | Thailand | |
| 1988 | คอนเสิร์ตหัวบันไดไม่แห้ง | Bangkok | Thailand | |
| 1989 | คอนเสิร์ตปิดท้ายทอย | Bangkok | Thailand | |
| 1994 | Concert for UNICEF : คอนเสิร์ตแก้คิดถึง...ฉลองสิบกว่าปีเฉลียง | Bangkok | Thailand | |
| 2000 | คอนเสิร์ตเรื่องราวบนแผ่นไม้ | Bangkok | Thailand | |
| 2007 | เหตุเกิดที่...เฉลียง "งานดนตรีบำบัด ถาปัดจัด เฉลียงโชว์" | Bangkok | Thailand | |
| 2016 | ปรากฏการณ์เฉลียง | Bangkok | Thailand | |
| 2020 | คอนเสิร์ต มหรสพอารมณ์ดี เฉลียงริมเล | Phuket | Thailand | |
| 2023 | เฉลียง Rare Item คอนเสิร์ต | Bangkok; Nakhon Pathom | Thailand | |
| 2026 | Sing Memories เพลงหวานในความทรงจำ | Bangkok | Thailand | |
| 2026 | เฉลียง นั่งเล่น นั่งเล่า | Bangkok | Thailand | |

== See also ==
- Thai pop
- Faculty of Architecture, Chulalongkorn University
- Rewat Buddhinan
