= Prapas Cholsaranon =

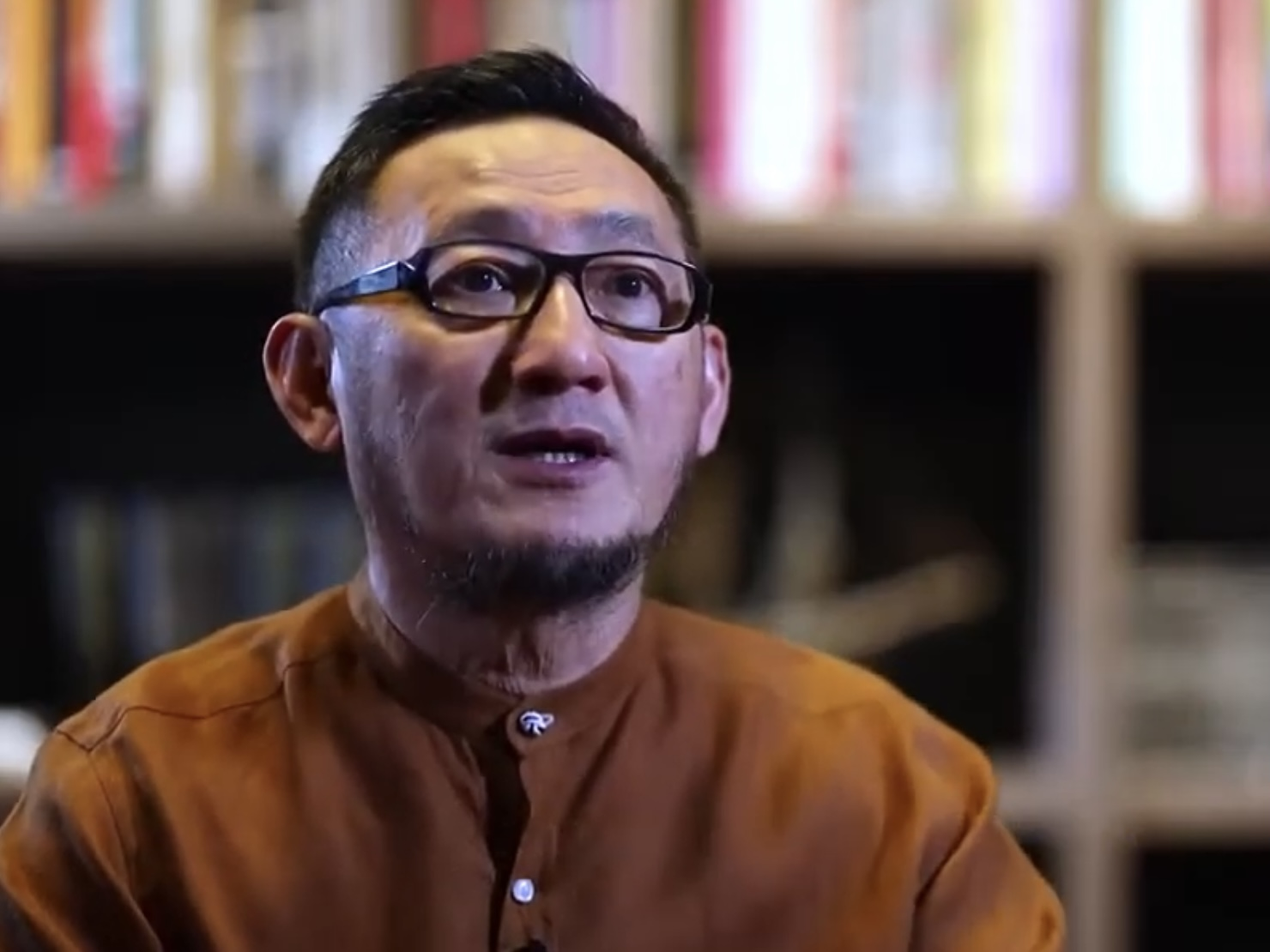

Background information
- Born: May 18, 1960 (age 66); Chonburi province

Prapas Cholsaranon (born May 18, 1960) is National Artist Year 2018 Performing Arts, International Music and International Dance Category (Creator of Thai International Entertainment and Music) Thinker, Writer, Songwriter, co-founder and Vice Chairman of Workpoint Entertainment Public Company Limited.

== Life ==
Prapas came from Nong Mon Subdistrict, Mueang Chonburi District, Chonburi Province. He graduated high school from Triam Udom Suksa School and holds a bachelor's degree from the Faculty of Architecture, Chulalongkorn University. He is also one of the co-founders of the band Chaliang, a band that is recognized as a pioneer of new musical styles, both in terms of content and melodies, for the Thai pop music industry.

Prapas joined hands with Phanya Nirunkul, a famous actor and host, who was a senior at the Faculty of Architecture, Chulalongkorn University, to establish Workpoint Entertainment Co., Ltd. on September 11, 1989, and managed it together, until the company grew and was listed on the Stock Exchange of Thailand as Workpoint Entertainment Public Company Limited in 2004.

== Awards ==
=== Honorary Awards ===
- TV Person of Honor Award An honorary award given to people in front of and behind the scenes of the television industry and who have made contributions to the Thai television industry.
- Lifetime Achievement The honorary award is given to those who have been in the music industry, both in front of and behind the scenes and have made contributions to the Thai music industry at The Guitar Mag Awards 2016.
- National Artist of the Year 2018 Performing Arts Branch, International Music and International Dance Category (Creator of Thai International Entertainment and Music).
