= Tod Sa Gun Game =

- เกมทศกัณฐ์
- Genre: Quiz show
- Created by: Praphas Cholsaranont
- Developed by: Workpoint Entertainment
- Presented by: Phanya Nirunkul
- Country of origin: Thailand
- Original language: Thai
- No. of episodes: 1700+

Production
- Executive producer: Rungtham Phumsinil
- Camera setup: Multi-camera
- Running time: 30 minutes

Original release
- Network: Modernine TV
- Release: 1 April 2003 – 28 February 2011

Related
- Yok Siam; Who's This?: Name the Fame

Tod Sa Gun Game (Thai: เกมทศกัณฐ์) was a highly successful Thai television quiz show produced by Workpoint Entertainment and broadcast on Modernine TV. Created by Praphas Cholsaranont and hosted by Phanya Nirunkul, the program ran daily from Monday to Friday. The show's title is derived from Thotsakan, the ten-faced manifestation of the giant Ravana in the classical Ramakien epic, symbolizing the core face-recognition mechanic of the gameplay.

During its eight-year run, the series became a cultural phenomenon in Thailand, particularly noted for its various spin-off tournaments, its children's iteration, and breaking regional television prize money records.

== Gameplay ==
=== Main format ===
In the primary game format, a single contestant faced a sequence of celebrity or historical faces projected onto a video wall. To capture the maximum jackpot of 10 million Baht, the player was required to correctly identity all 10 faces consecutively without making a single error.

=== Face-to-Face (One-on-One) format ===
In the face-to-face iteration, two contestants directly competed against each other. Each player was tasked with identifying as many faces as possible within a strict one-minute time frame. A player maintained control of the board as long as they provided correct answers consecutively. If a contestant erred or passed, control passed to their opponent. The base jackpot started at 1 million Baht, with an additional 1 million Baht added to the prize pool for every month a contestant successfully defended their championship title up to a maximum cap of 10 million Baht.

== Chronology and spin-offs ==
The program evolved through several structural eras and title adjustments to maintain viewership interest over its run:

=== Tod Sa Gun Game era (2003–2008) ===
- Thotsakan (เกมทศกัณฐ์): The classic baseline standalone format (April 1, 2003 – October 28, 2005).
- Thotsakan Yok Thap (ทศกัณฐ์ ยกทัพ; The Tag Team): A three-person team format where representatives faced opponents in knockout face-guessing rounds. If a player missed an answer, they were eliminated and replaced by a teammate. Winning 10 consecutive series unlocked a progressive picture-unveiling jackpot game worth up to 30 million Baht (October 31, 2005 – December 29, 2006).
- Thotsakan Chamlaeng (ทศกัณฐ์ จำแลง; The Disguise): Shifted back to individual play but introduced a puzzle hook. Contestants were presented with a cryptic keyword alongside two distinct faces and had to deduce which individual matched the provided clue (January 1 – June 15, 2007).

=== Special tournaments ===
- Thotsakan Suek Thotsakan Na Thong (ทศกัณฐ์ ศึกทศกัณฐ์หน้าทอง; The Golden Mask Showdown): An elite bracket in 2005 that invited prominent, long-reigning champions back to the studio for a head-to-head tournament. Winners were awarded a commemorative golden Thotsakan mask trophy and a 1 million Baht cash prize.
- Thotsakan Chuay Khru Tai (ทศกัณฐ์ ช่วยครูใต้; Help Southern Teachers): A special charity run featuring local celebrities playing to secure grants and financial support for educators working within the conflict-affected southern border provinces of Thailand (June 18, 2007 – February 15, 2008).

=== Yok Siam era (2008–2011) ===
In late February 2008, the program underwent a radical structural overhaul, rebranding as Thotsakan Yok Siam (later shortened simply to Yok Siam in April 2008). The face-recognition mechanics were replaced by team-based provincial representation. Teams representing the 76 provinces of Thailand competed in a massive knockout tree answering multiple-choice questions focused on Thai history, regional geography, and local cultural heritage. Because the core face-identification motif was eliminated, the "Thotsakan" name was dropped entirely from the broadcast title after June 2008.

- Yok Siam 100 Kho (100 Questions): Broadcast from March 1 to June 2, 2010.
- Yok Siam 10 Kho (10 Questions): The final condensed broadcast cycle, running from June 3, 2010, until the series finale on February 28, 2011.

== Children's edition ==
A parallel weekend spin-off titled Thotsakan Dek (เกมทศกัณฐ์เด็ก; Kids Edition) was launched to critical acclaim. Child contestants competed individually to match prominent names to faces to secure academic scholarships worth up to 1 million Baht. The run famously produced child prodigies who demonstrated encyclopedic face-recognition skill sets, contributing significantly to Workpoint Entertainment's international formatting profile at the Asian Television Awards.
