= Somwang Patamakanthin =

Somwang Patamakanthin (Thai: สมหวัง ปัทมคันธิน, pronounced [sǒm wǎŋ pát.ma.kʰan.tʰīn]; born October 10, 1976), also simply known as Jom Patamakanthin, is a Thai field malacologist and conchologist, as well as a shell collector and scientific illustrator.

He was born in Chiang Mai, northern Thailand, and later grew up in Phuket near Rawai Beach. His father, Somnuek Patamakanthin, a businessman based in Phuket with an interest in shells, introduced him to nature at an early age. As a child, Somwang often explored the shoreline during low tide, observing marine life including various mollusks and octopuses.

Although he did not receive formal scientific training, he developed an interest in mollusks independently. His involvement in shell collecting began when he corresponded in simple English with collectors abroad. One of these exchanges led a Portuguese collector to visit him in Phuket.

Shell collecting also took him to different places around the world, where he sought and exchanged specimens. Alongside this, he practiced art from a young age and later produced his own shell illustrations.

He also contributed to the establishment of two shell museums. The first, created by his father in Phuket, contained a large private collection of shells. In 2009, Somwang established another museum in Bangkok, located at the corner of Silom Road near Lerdsin Hospital. Both museums have since closed.

== Taxon described by him ==
- Turbo somnueki Patamakanthin, 2001 [= Turbo tursicus (Reeve, 1843)]
- Haliotis thailandis Dekker & Pakamanthin, 2001
- Cymbiola tamariskae Sutanto & Patamakanthin, 2004
- Haliotis ovina volcanius Patamakanthin & Eng, 2007

== Eponymous species ==
- Turritella jompatamakanthini (Cossignani, 2022)

== Publications ==
- Poppe, G.T. & Patamakanthin S. 2005: On the Discovery of New Population of Turbinella fusus Sowerby, 1825, a valid species.
- Jom Patamakanthin 2012: แฟนหอยพันธุ์แท้, 186 [published Chabangoen] (in Thai)
