= Boonchu =

Boonchu (Thai: บุญชู, RTGS: Bunchu) is a Thai masculine given name meaning 'elevated by merit', from Pali: puñña + Thai: chu. People with the name include:

- Boonchu Chandrubeksa (1913–1976), Royal Thai Air Force commander
- Boonchu Rojanastien (1921–2007), banker and politician
- Boonchu Ruangkit (born 1956), golfer
- Boonchu Trithong (born 1945), politician
