= Phanya Nirunkul =

Thai actor

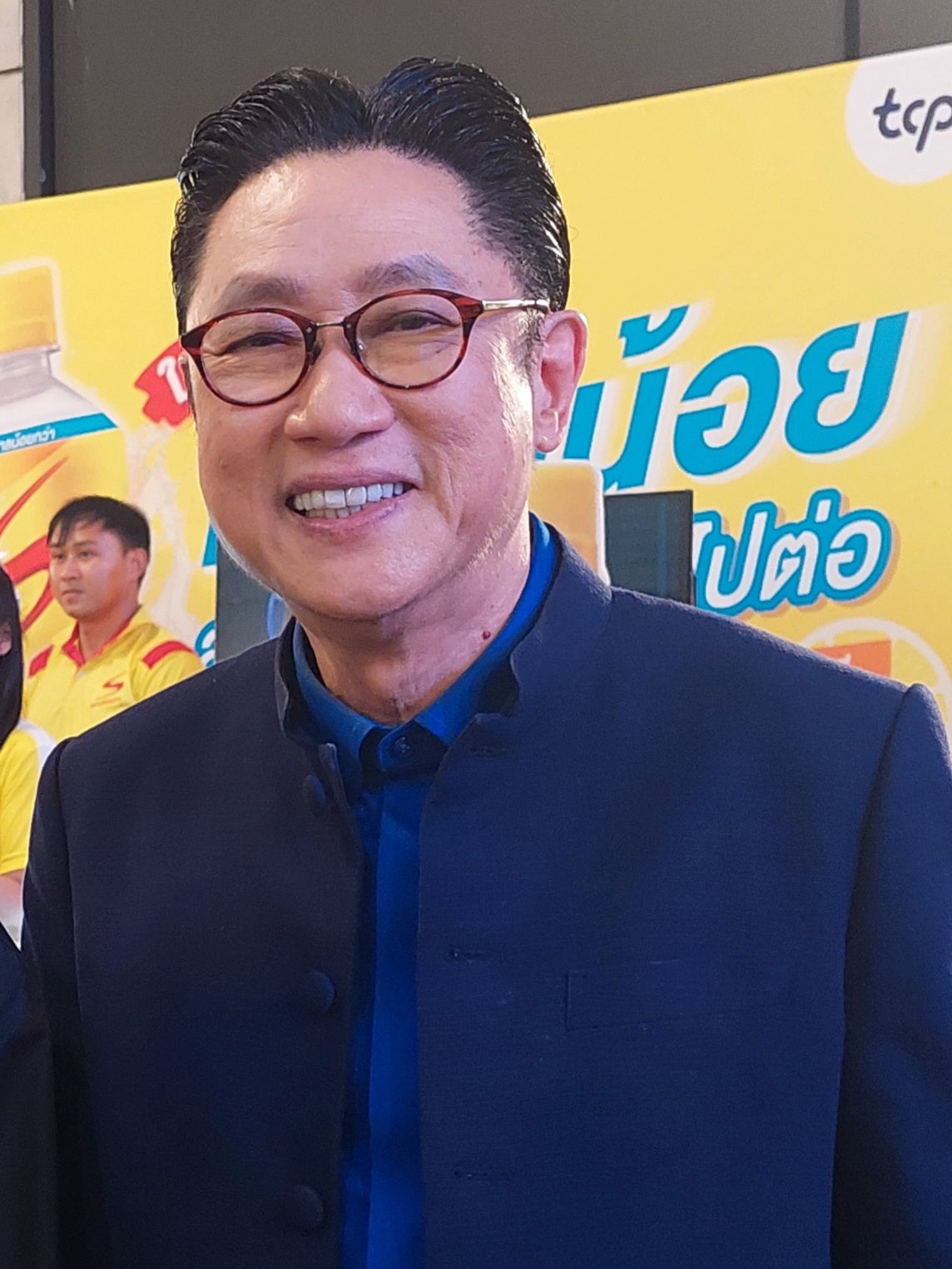
- Born: March 24, 1954 (age 72); Bangkok, Thailand
- Education: Faculty of Architecture, Chulalongkorn University
- Occupations: actors, host, businessman
- Years active: 1978–present
- Title: Chairman of the Board of Directors of Workpoint Entertainment Public Company Limited
- Spouse: Wassana Nirunkul
- Children: 4
- Mother: Amphan Nirunkul
- Awards: Best Entertainment Presenter (2006, 2008, 2009, 2013)

Phanya Nirunkul (Thai: ปัญญา นิรันดร์กุล, born 24 March 1954) nickname Ta (Thai: ตา) is a Thai actor, host and businessman. He is one of the co-founders and chairman of Workpoint Entertainment Public Company Limited.

== Early life ==
Phanya Nirunkul had the real name is Phanya Kitinirunkul but later the word "Kiti" was removed and had nickname is Piang (Thai: เปียง) currently is now known as Ta (Thai: ตา) or Sia Ta (Thai: เสี่ยตา). He was born on March 24, 1954, into a Thai-Chinese family. His mother, Amphan Nirunkul, was the 2003 National Outstanding Mother.

Graduated with a bachelor's degree from the Faculty of Architecture, Chulalongkorn University in 1977.

== Family ==
Panya is married to Aew Wasana Nirandkul and has four children and five grandchildren (the Workpoint TV channel number comes from his wife's birthday, which is the 23rd).

== Entertainment industry ==
=== Movies and Television dramas ===
Phanya first entered the entertainment industry by acting in the Thai film Sueb Yat Sai (Thai: สืบยัดไส้) in 1978 as an extra actors. In the same year, he acted in his first leading role in the drama Sri-thanonchai (Thai: ศรีธนญชัย) on Channel 3, directed by Phatrawadi Sritrairat or Meechuthon, a National Artist in Performing Arts, a famous actor, director and acting teacher. He also had the opportunity to act in leading roles in many films and television dramas, famously paired with Orapan Watcharapol (née Panthong, currently the president of Polyplus Entertainment) and Penphisut Kongsamut (wife of Winij Lertratanachai, a famous former DJ, who she has now retired from the entertainment industry).

=== Television shows ===
In 1984, Phanya joined the founding members of the show Stress Killer (Thai: เพชฌฆาตความเครียด, a show who produced by the alumni of the Faculty of Architecture, Chulalongkorn University, under the name of the group Sumo Sam-ang) on Channel 9, using the name Sumo Ta. His most memorable role was as a host of the show Pasa Thai Kham La Wan (ภาษาไทยคำละวัน), a parody of the show, Pasa Thai Wan La Kham (ภาษาไทยวันละคำ) of Prof. Kanchana Naksakul, a Royal Academician. Later in the same year (from 1984 to 1989), after Phanya started worked as an employee of JSL, he became a host of JSL shows such as Phlik Lock (followed by Koo hoo Phlik Lock, Phlik Lock Petch, and Phlik Lock Nuea Mek), Concert Contest, etc., before resigning from being an employee of JSL to establish his own television production company.

== Establishment of Workpoint Entertainment ==
On September 11, 1989, Phanya joined forces with Prapas Cholsaranon, a Phanya's junior at the Faculty of Architecture who used to work as a TV program producer for JSL company to establish Workpoint Entertainment Co., Ltd. with an initial registered capital of 2 million baht to produce TV programs and TV dramas.

Then on February 26, 2004, Workpoint Company registered to transform into a public limited company and initial public offering during September 20–22, 2004. On September 29, 2004, the company began trading on the Stock Exchange of Thailand for the first day.

== Awards and Honors ==
1987 (B.E. 2530)

- Golden Television Awards: Outstanding Male Television Host for Plik Lok.

1989 (B.E. 2532)

- Mekhala Awards: Outstanding Supporting Actor for the television drama Somkan Wai.
- Honorary Plaque from the Thai Tailors Association: Outstanding Dresser in the Actor Category.

1990 (B.E. 2533)

- Wyne Berg Academy: Certificate of Recognition for Outstanding Television Host for Ching Roi Ching Lan.
- Outstanding Executive of the Year Award for 1989: Presented by Khao Thurakit newspaper.

1991 (B.E. 2534)

- Mekhala Awards: Best Supporting Actor for the television drama Tawan Ching Phlop.
- Golden Television Awards: Best Supporting Actor for the television drama Tawan Ching Phlop.

1992 (B.E. 2535)

- Mekhala Awards: Outstanding Male Television Host for Ching Roi Ching Lan.

1993 (B.E. 2536)

- Second-Class Red Cross Medal of Appreciation.

1999 (B.E. 2542)

- Outstanding Youth Artist Award, Male Host Category: For Game Kae Jon, presented by the National Youth Promotion and Coordination Committee (NYPC).

2000 (B.E. 2543)

- Mekhala Awards: Outstanding Supporting Actor for the television drama Chao Sua Noi.
- Top Awards 2000: Best Supporting Actor for Chao Sua Noi.
- Thep Thong Awards: Outstanding Individual in Radio and Television for 1998–2000.

2001 (B.E. 2544)

- Golden Television Awards: Outstanding Game Show Host for Fan Phan Tae.
- Mekhala Awards: Outstanding Male Television Host for Fan Phan Tae.
- Star Entertainment Awards 2002: Outstanding Male Host for Fan Phan Tae.

2002 (B.E. 2545)

- Mekhala Awards: Outstanding Male Television Host for Fan Phan Tae.

2003 (B.E. 2546)

- Outstanding Thai Language User in Radio and Television Award: Outstanding Television Presenter Using the Thai Language, for 2002–2003, for Fan Phan Tae, presented by the Public Relations Department.
- Outstanding Thai Media Popularity Award 2003: Television Category.

2004 (B.E. 2547)

- Outstanding Thai Language User in Radio and Television Award: Outstanding Television Presenter Using the Thai Language for 2004, for Fan Phan Tae, presented by the Public Relations Department.
- Boss of the Year 2004: Award in Entertainment Business Management, presented by BOSS magazine.
- Mekhala Awards: Outstanding Male Television Host for Game Thotsakan.
- Award for a Highly Grateful Child: In recognition of exceptional gratitude toward one’s parents.

2005 (B.E. 2548)

- Outstanding Thai Language User in Radio and Television Award: Outstanding Television Presenter Using the Thai Language for 2005, for Fan Phan Tae, presented by the Public Relations Department.
- Outstanding Thai Language User in Radio and Television Award: Outstanding Television Presenter Using the Thai Language for 2005, for Game Thotsakan, presented by the Public Relations Department.
- Diamond-Studded Gold Commemorative Pin and Certificate of Honor: In recognition of three consecutive years of excellence in using the Thai language on television, presented by the Public Relations Department.
- 11th Phet Siam Honorary Award 2005: Thai Way of Life Category, for television programming that promotes local wisdom, presented by Chandrakasem Rajabhat University.
- Asian Television Awards 2005: Winner, Best Entertainment Presenter in Asia, for Klong Dam (first win).

2006 (B.E. 2549)

- Ent Biz Award: Recognition for outstanding contributions to Thailand’s entertainment business, presented by the University of the Thai Chamber of Commerce.
- Asian Television Awards 2006: Winner, Best Entertainment Presenter in Asia, for Thotsakan Dek (second win).
- TV Gossip Awards 2006: Most Popular Male Host, based on the highest number of votes, for Game Thotsakan Yok Thap, organized by TV Gossip magazine in collaboration with ABAC Poll.
- Top Awards 2006: Best Television Host for Fan Phan Tae.
- Thep Thong Awards: Outstanding Radio and Television Broadcaster for Game Thotsakan Dek.

2007 (B.E. 2550)

- TV Gossip Awards 2007: Most Popular Male Host, based on the highest number of votes, for Ching Roi Ching Lan Cha Cha Cha, organized by TV Gossip magazine in collaboration with ABAC Poll.
- Outstanding Gratitude Award: Recognition as a role model for love and gratitude toward benefactors, presented by the Ministry of Culture.
- Asian Television Awards 2007: Runner-up, Best Entertainment Presenter in Asia, for Klong Dam (first runner-up placement).

2008 (B.E. 2551)

- Outstanding Thai Language User Award 2008: Presented by the Office of the National Culture Commission, Ministry of Culture.
- Mom Ngamchit Burachat Award for Promoting Ethical People 2008: Outstanding Radio and Television Presenter who uses the Thai language correctly and clearly.
- Asian Television Awards 2008: Highly Commended, Best Entertainment Presenter in Asia, for Klong Dam (second runner-up placement).
- Top Awards 2008: Best Television Host for Lan Pu Ku Iju.

2009 (B.E. 2552)

- Award for Promoting Buddhist Values: Presented to artists, public figures, and members of the media who serve as exemplary Buddhists, on the occasion of Makha Bucha Day 2009.
- Asian Television Awards 2009: Highly Commended, Best Entertainment Presenter in Asia, for Yok Siam (third runner-up placement).
- Prakai Phet Award: Outstanding Producer of Thai Language Promotion Programs for 2009, presented by the Phet Phasa Foundation.
- Top Awards 2009: Best Television Host for Ching Roi Ching Lan.

2011 (B.E. 2554)

- Royal Institute Commendation Award: Outstanding Male Presenter Using the Thai Language, for Yok Siam.
- Dara Daily Presenter of the Year 2011: Awarded to Panya Nirankul by Dara Daily.
- 24th Mekhala Awards: Most Popular Outstanding Male Presenter for SME Tee Taek.
- 25 Years for a Smoke-Free Thai Society: Certificate of Recognition.
- Golden Bell Award 2012: Person of the Year in the Outstanding Organizational Development category, Businessperson and Individual division.
- 1st National Television and Radio Awards – Phikhanesuan Awards 2012: Outstanding Male Host for Ching Roi Ching Lan Sunshine Day.
- Watthanakhunathon Award: Recognition for contributions to culture, presented by the Ministry of Culture.

2013 (B.E. 2556)

- Mekhala Awards: Most Popular Outstanding Male Presenter of the Year for Ban Chao Panya.
- 2nd National Television and Radio Awards – Phikhanesuan Awards 2013: Honorary Award for Outstanding Support of Radio and Television.
- Khon Dee Sri Siam Award 2013: Recognition for outstanding contributions to society.
- Asian Television Awards 2013: Winner, Best Entertainment Presenter in Asia, for Ching Roi Ching Lan Sunshine Day (third win).
- Ratsadakornphiphat Award for 2012: Recognition of a taxpayer who demonstrates a high standard of tax compliance and civic responsibility, presented by the Revenue Department.

2014 (B.E. 2557)

- CEO Thailand Awards 2014: Executive of the Year, organized by the Assembly of Radio, Television, and Newspaper News Program Producers of Thailand (สนท.).
- 3rd National Television and Radio Awards – Phikhanesuan Awards 2014: Best Television Host.
- 6th Nataraja Awards 2014: Best Television Host for Prissana Fah Laep.

2015 (B.E. 2558)

- Creative Entertainment Award: Presented at the Me Awards 2015.
- Special Honorary Award for Television Programs Creating Opportunities for Luk Thung Artists: Presented by the Ministry of Culture.
- 4th Phikhanesuan Awards 2015: Outstanding Male Television Host for Prissana Fah Laep.
- 30th Golden Television Awards 2015: Outstanding Game Show Host for Prissana Fah Laep.
- Outstanding Businessperson of the Year 2015: Selected through an online vote on the Bangkok Biz News website.

2016 (B.E. 2559)

- World Top Award – Person of the Year: CEO of the Year in Entertainment Management.
- Certificate of Recognition from the National Council on Social Welfare of Thailand: In appreciation of support for the council’s activities on National Mother’s Day 2016.
- Maya Awards 2016 (Maya Mahachon): People’s Choice Award for Favorite Male Host for Prissana Fah Laep.
- Asian Television Awards 2016: Winner, Best Entertainment Presenter in Asia, for Prissana Fah Laep (fourth win).

2017 (B.E. 2560)

- Maya Awards 2017: People’s Choice Honorary Television Personality Award, organized by Maya Channel magazine on August 8, 2017.

2018 (B.E. 2561)

- Thailand Digital Awards 2018: Honorary Award for an Exemplary Senior Executive in the Management and Development of Thai Television Media in the Digital Era, presented to Panya Nirankul by a project promoting public- and private-sector executives in the digital technology era for national economic and social development, on February 17, 2018.
- 32nd Golden Television Awards: Television Lifetime Achievement Award.
- Honorary Doctorate Recognition Award 2018: Presented by the Thai Social Creativity Foundation on June 24, 2018.
- Thailand Headlines Person of the Year Awards 2018: Award in the Political News category, organized by Thailand Headlines and Jiaranai Entertainment Co., Ltd., on September 27, 2018.

2019 (B.E. 2562)

- National Person of the Year Award 2019: Performing Arts Category, presented by the Thai Social Network Committee on February 2, 2019.

2020 (B.E. 2563)

- Asian Academy Creative Awards 2020 (AAA): Grand Final Winner in the Best Lifestyle, Entertainment Presenter/Host category for Panya Pun Suk, awarded on December 5, 2020.

2022 (B.E. 2565)

- Traisaranabucha Phra Sema Siam Award 2022: Royal Award in the category of individuals who uphold moral values in their professions and promote Buddhism, presented on July 9, 2022.
- Quality Person of the Year 2022: Social Sector category, presented by the Foundation of the Council of Science and Technology of Thailand (FOSTAT) on October 19, 2022.

2023 (B.E. 2566)

- HOWE Awards 2023: THE 50 INFLUENTIAL PEOPLE 2023 – HOWE SMART BUSINESS AWARD, presented by Howe Magazine on October 30, 2023.

2024 (B.E. 2567)

- Nine Entertain Awards 2024: Behind-the-Scenes Person of the Year, organized by MCOT Public Company Limited on June 12, 2024.
- Senate Faith in Goodness Honorary Plaque: Recognition for contributions to society, particularly through Panya Pun Suk, which provides assistance and support to people experiencing hardship. The award was presented by Wallop Tangkananurak, Chairman of the Senate Committee on Social Development and Affairs Concerning Children, Youth, Women, Older Persons, Persons with Disabilities, and Disadvantaged People, on June 20, 2024.
- Daily News Awards 2024: D-Songserm Suk Award for Panya Pun Suk, organized by the Daily News newspaper on November 26, 2024.
