= Workpoint Entertainment =

Thai media company

Coordinates: 13°59′35″N 100°35′51″E

Workpoint Entertainment Public Company Limited
- Type: Public
- Traded as: SET: WORK
- ISIN: TH0788010005
- Industry: Mass media
- Founded: 11 September 1989; 37 years ago
- Founder: Phanya Nirunkul & Prapas Cholsaranon
- Headquarters: Pathum Thani, Thailand
- Area served: Worldwide
- Revenue: 1.354 billion THB (2010)
- Owner: Phanya Nirunkul (23.97%); Prapas Cholsaranon (22.94%); Major Cineplex Group (14.94%)
- Subsidiaries: Workpoint TV; Workpoint Publishing Co., Ltd. Hua Film Tai Film Co., Ltd. Sixnature Incorporation Co., Ltd. Ground Co., Ltd. Baan Ittirit Co., Ltd. Kam Phor Dee Co., Ltd. Toh Gloam Television Co., Ltd. Bangfire Studio Co., Ltd. Kumkubkarndee Co., Ltd.
- Website: www.workpoint.co.th www.workpointtv.com

Workpoint Entertainment Public Company Limited is a Thai media company. The company and its subsidiaries do business in television production, film making, event management, animation, publishing, event marketing and recording. The company was founded in 1989 by Phanya Nirunkul and Prapas Cholsaranon, and went public on the Stock Exchange of Thailand in 2004. The company, which has been called "the No. 1 TV producer in Thailand" by the Hollywood Reporter, has produced over eighty television programmes, with fifteen programmes broadcast weekly on free television in 2011. Mainly focusing on game shows, Workpoint's first production was Ve Tee Thong (Golden Stage), which was broadcast on Channel 7 from 1989 to 2007. It soon expanded into other genres and has produced variety shows, soap operas, sitcoms, animations and feature films. Its productions include the Asian Television Award-winning Game Jarachon, Fan Pan Tae, Todsagun Kid Game, Lharn Phoo Koo E-Joo and Wittaya Subphayuth. Two of its productions, Lharn Phoo Koo E-Joo and Talok Hok Chak, have also received nominations for the International Emmy Awards.

Workpoint's productions have from time to time been the subject of various controversies. Popular programmes including Fan Pan Tae, Todsagun Game and Tpop have seen criticisms of inaccuracy and allegations of being rigged. In 2012, the second season of Thailand's Got Talent became subject of intense criticism when a contestant who displayed her breasts on stage was revealed to have been paid by the organisers in order to boost ratings.

== TV Business ==
Can be divided into 3 types as follows

1. TV program business broadcasting on digital television channels under the name Workpoint TV number 23
2. Television programs broadcast online
3. Business of distributing television broadcasting rights (Licensing)

== Television program franchise ==
=== 2 Faces ===
| Countries | Title | Network |
|---|---|---|
| Thailand | Face Off แฝดคนละฝา | Workpoint TV (2024–2026) |
| Vietnam | A.I là ai? | HTV7 (2025–Present) |

=== Big Box ===
| Countries | Title | Network |
|---|---|---|
| Thailand | กล่องของขวัญ | Workpoint TV (2019–2020) |
| Indonesia | Studio Impian | GTV (2019–2020) |

=== Black Box ===
| Countries | Title | Network |
|---|---|---|
| Thailand | กล่องดำ | Channel 3 (2005–2008); Channel 5 (2008); Workpoint TV (Rerun 2011) |
| Vietnam | Hộp đen | Hanoi TV |

=== Ching Roi Ching Lan ===
| Countries | Title | Network |
|---|---|---|
| Indonesia | Cring Cring Wow Wow Wow | SCTV (2017) |
| Thailand | ชิงร้อยชิงล้าน ว้าว ว้าว ว้าว | Channel 7(1990–1997, 2006–2011); Channel 3(1998, 2012–2015); Channel 5(1998–2006); Workpoint TV (2015–2023) |
| Vietnam | Kỳ tài thách đấu Wow Wow Wow | HTV7 (2016–2021) |

=== Drive Me Home ===
| Countries | Title | Network |
|---|---|---|
| Thailand | ราชรถมาเกย | Modernine TV (2011–2013) |
| Vietnam | Đưa Em Về Nhà | HTV2 (2019 - 2020) |

=== Gang of Gags ===
| Countries | Title | Network |
|---|---|---|
| Singapore | Gang of Gags | Singapore Airlines |
| Thailand | ตลก 6 ฉาก | Channel 5 (2007–2014); Workpoint TV (2015–2022) |
| Vietnam | Biệt đội siêu hài | HTV7 |
| Japan | Gang of Gags | NHK |
| Cambodia | Gang of Gags | CTN |

=== Gang of Ghosts ===
| Countries | Title | Network |
|---|---|---|
| Cambodia | Gang of Ghosts | TV5 Cambodia |
| Thailand | คนอวดผี | Channel 7 (2010–2011); Channel 5 (2012–2014); Workpoint TV (2015–2022) |
| Hong Kong | Gang of Ghosts | |
| Japan | Gang of Ghosts | |
| Indonesia | Menembus Mata Batin | ANTV |

=== Generation Gap ===
| Countries | Title | Network |
|---|---|---|
| Thailand | หลานปู่ กู้อีจู้ | Channel 7 (2008–2010) |
| Thailand | หนูน้อย กู้อีจู้ | Channel 7 (2010–2011); Channel 5 (2012–2014) |
| Vietnam | Cháu ơi cháu à | VTV3 |

=== Lightning Quiz ===
| Countries | Title | Network |
|---|---|---|
| Thailand | ปริศนาฟ้าแลบ | Workpoint TV (2014–2019) |
| Vietnam | Nhanh như chớp | HTV7 (2018–Present) |

=== Little Big Gang ===
| Countries | Title | Network |
|---|---|---|
| Singapore | Little Big Gang | Singapore Airlines |
| Thailand | แก๊งนมกล่อง | Workpoint TV |
| Vietnam | Siêu hài nhí | HTV7 |

=== Love Blood ===
| Countries | Title | Network |
|---|---|---|
| Cambodia | Love Blood | |
| Thailand | เลิฟบลัด | Workpoint TV |
| Vietnam | Bộ tứ rắc rối | HTV3 |

=== Mic On Debt Off ===
| Countries | Title | Network |
|---|---|---|
| Indonesia | Mikrofon Pelunas Utang | Indosiar (2017–2018) |
| Thailand | ไมค์หมดหนี้ | Workpoint TV (2016–Present) |
| Cambodia | ម៉ៃក្រូហ្វូនដោះបំណុល | Bayon TV (2019–2020) |
| Malaysia | Mikrofon Impian | Astro Ria (2019) |
| India | Mic On Debt Off | |

=== Office Syndrome ===
| Countries | Title | Network |
|---|---|---|
| Cambodia | Office Syndrome | |
| Thailand | เกมริษยา | Workpoint TV |

=== Outlaw Beauty ===
| Countries | Title | Network |
|---|---|---|
| Cambodia | Outlaw Beauty | |
| Thailand | ดอกไม้ลายพาดกลอน | Workpoint TV (2015) |
| Vietnam | Outlaw Beauty | |

=== Seven Days ===
| Countries | Title | Network |
|---|---|---|
| Cambodia | Seven Days | |
| Myanmar | Seven Days | |
| Thailand | 7 วันจองเวร | Workpoint TV |

=== Spy Game ===
| Countries | Title | Network |
|---|---|---|
| Thailand | เกมจารชน | Channel 5 (1998–2005); Workpoint TV (2017) |
| Indonesia | Spy Game | TPI |

=== Super Muaythai ===
| Countries | Title | Network |
|---|---|---|
| France | Super Muaythai | France 3 |
| Thailand | ซูเปอร์มวยไทย | Workpoint TV |
| Indonesia | Super Muaythai | RTV |

=== The Band ===
| Countries | Title | Network |
|---|---|---|
| Cambodia | The Band | |
| Peru | La banda | Latina TV (2014–2015) |
| Thailand | เดอะแบนด์ไทยแลนด์ | Modernine TV (2013) |
| Vietnam | Ban nhạc Việt - The Band | VTV3 (2017–2019) |
| Norway | The Band | |

=== The Fan ===
| Countries | Title | Network |
|---|---|---|
| Sweden | Fantasterna | TV4 (2013) |
| Thailand | แฟนพันธุ์แท้ | Channel 5 (2000–2008,2012-2014); Workpoint TV (2015–2018) |
| United Kingdom | The Fanatics | Sky 1 (2015) |

=== The Innocent Face ===
| Countries | Title | Network |
|---|---|---|
| Cambodia | The Innocent Face | |
| Thailand | หน้ากากนางเอก | Workpoint TV (2016) |
| Vietnam | The Innocent Face | |
| China | The Innocent Face | |

=== Who's This ===
| Countries | Title | Network |
|---|---|---|
| Thailand | เกมทศกัณฐ์ | Modernine TV (2003–2008) |
| Vietnam | Ai là ai | VTV3 |

=== Secret of Numbers ===
| Countries | Title | Network |
|---|---|---|
| Thailand | เลขอวดกรรม | Workpoint TV (2016–2020) |
| Indonesia | Karma | ANTV (2017–2018) |

=== Black Sheep ===
| Countries | Title | Network |
|---|---|---|
| Thailand | สายลับจับแกะ | Workpoint TV (2014–2015) |
| Italy | Black Sheep | |
| Cambodia | Black Sheep | |

=== Super 10 ===
| Countries | Title | Network |
|---|---|---|
| Thailand | ซูเปอร์เท็น | Workpoint TV (2017–Present) |
| Indonesia | Super 10 Indonesia | RTV (2019) |
| Vietnam | Siêu tài năng nhí | HTV7 (2020–2023) |
| Japan | Super 10 | |

=== Little Lightning ===
| Countries | Title | Network |
|---|---|---|
| Thailand | ฟ้าแลบเด็ก | Workpoint TV (2017–2019) |
| Vietnam | Nhanh như chớp nhí | HTV2 (2018–Present) |

=== Love Judge ===
| Countries | Title | Network |
|---|---|---|
| Thailand | คดีสีชมพู | Workpoint TV (2014–2017) |
| Vietnam | Phiên Tòa Tình Yêu | HTV2 (2018) |

=== The Rapper ===
| Countries | Title | Network |
|---|---|---|
| Thailand | เดอะแร็ปเปอร์ | Workpoint TV (2018–2021) |
| Vietnam | Rap Việt | HTV2 - Vie Channel (2020–present) |
| France | The Rapper | |
| Cambodia | The Rapper Cambodia | Bayon TV (2023–present) |

=== The Wall Song ===
| Countries | Title | Network |
|---|---|---|
| Thailand | The Wall Song ร้องข้ามกำแพง | Workpoint TV (2020–Present) |
| Vietnam | Lạ lắm à nha | VTV3 (2021–2023) |
| Brazil | Wall Duet Brazil | SBT (2021–2022) |
| France | The Wall Duet | |
| Italy | The Wall Duet | |
| Netherlands | Secret Duets | RTL4 (2021–2024) |
| Belgium | The Wall Duet | |
| Spain | The Wall Duet | |
| Germany | The Wall Duet | |
| Portugal | The Wall Duet | |
| Israel | The Wall Duet | |
| Australia | The Wall Duet | |
| New Zealand | The Wall Duet | |
| Denmark | The Wall Duet | |
| UK | The Wall Duet | |
| Finland | The Wall Duet | |
| Sweden | The Wall Duet | |
| Cambodia | The Wall Song Cambodia | PNN TV (2022–Present) |
| Norway | Hemmelige Duetter | TV2 (2023) |

=== 10 Fight 10 ===
| Countries | Title | Network |
|---|---|---|
| Thailand | 10 Fight 10 | Workpoint TV |
| Hong Kong | 10 Fight 10 | |

== See also ==
- Category:Television series by Workpoint Entertainment
