= I Can See Your Voice Thailand season 1 =

Television game show season

I Can See Your Voice Thailand
- Season 1
- Starring: Nilubon Amonwitthawat; Nalin Hohler; Thanawat Prasitsomporn; Jakkawal Saothongyuttitum; Maneenuch Smerasut
- Hosted by: Somkiat Chanpram; Kan Kantathavorn
- Winners: Good singers: 55; Bad singers: 22
- No. of episodes: Regular: 77; Special: 2; Overall: 79

Release
- Original network: Workpoint TV
- Original release: 13 January 2016 – 9 August 2017

Season chronology
- Next → Season 2

The first season of the Thai television mystery music game show I Can See Your Voice Thailand premiered on Workpoint TV on 13 January 2016.

== Gameplay ==
=== Format ===
According to the original South Korean rules, the guest artist(s) must attempt to eliminate bad singers during its game phase. At the final performance, the last remaining mystery singer is revealed as either good or bad by means of a duet between them and one of the guest artists.

=== Rounds ===
1. Visual round
  The guest artist is given some time to observe and examine each mystery singer based on their appearance. Afterward, a muted video of each mystery singer that reveals only 0.3 seconds of their singing voice is played as an additional hint.
2. Introduction round
  Each mystery singer self-introduces to guest artist and panelists. Good singers are telling the truth, while bad singers are allowed to lie.
3. Lip sync round
  Each mystery singer performs a lip sync to a song; good singers mime to a recording of their own, while bad singers mime to a backing track by another vocalist.
4. 1. Interrogation round
  The guest artist may ask questions to the remaining mystery singers. Good singers are required to give truthful responses, while the bad singers must lie.
4. 2. Talent round (eps. 53—79)
  The guest artist must describe one of the mystery singer's other talents, except "singing" itself. This may not be related to the "stage of truth", but depends on their identity.

== Episodes ==
=== Guest artists ===
Legend:
Good singer
Bad singer

2016 games
Episode		Guest artist (Note: Players' note: For the returning guest artists (who also include foreigners and former good singers), names are displayed in italics.)	Winner
#	Date	Guest artist	Winner
1	13 January 2016	Saranyu Winaipanit	Bad
2	20 January 2016	Arnon Saisangchan	Good
3	27 January 2016	Peerapat Tenwong	Bad
4	3 February 2016	Kornpob Janjarearn	Bad
5	10 February 2016	Sirisin Chotvijit (AB Normal)	Good
6	17 February 2016	Prakarn Raiva (Getsunova)	Good
7	24 February 2016	Sarunrat Visutthithada	Bad
8	2 March 2016	Saksit Vejsupaporn	Bad
9	9 March 2016	Apiwat Eurthavornsuk	Good
10	16 March 2016	Jirakorn Sompitak	Bad
11	23 March 2016	Chinawut Indracusin	Good
12	30 March 2016	Mild	Bad
13	6 April 2016	Pongkool Suebsung	Bad
14	13 April 2016	Rangsan Panyaruen	Good
15	20 April 2016	Anuwat Sanguansakpakdee (Peacemaker)	Good
16	27 April 2016	Palitchoke Ayanaputra	Bad
17	4 May 2016	Jintara Poonlarp	Good
18	11 May 2016	Burin Boonvisut	Bad
19	18 May 2016	Preeyawit Niljulka	Good
20	25 May 2016	Popetorn Soonthornyanakij	Good
21	1 June 2016	Singto Numchok	Good
22	8 June 2016	Issara Kitnitchi	Good
23	15 June 2016	Phunkorn Boonyachinda	Good
24	22 June 2016	Ratklao Amaradit	Good
25	29 June 2016	Saharat Sangkapreecha	Good
26	6 July 2016	Lipta	Good
27	13 July 2016	Jack (The Richman Toys)	Good
28	20 July 2016	Thierry Mekwattana	Good
29	27 July 2016	Chaiamorn Kaewwiboonpan (The Bottom Blues)	Bad
30	3 August 2016	Saranyu Winaipanit	Bad
31	10 August 2016	Kornpob Janjarearn	Bad
32	17 August 2016	Saksit Vejsupaporn	Good
33	24 August 2016	Jirakorn Sompitak	Bad
34	31 August 2016	Theng Therdtherng	Bad
35	7 September 2016	Ohm (Cocktail)	Good
36	14 September 2016	Etcetera	Good
37	21 September 2016	Rannaphan Yungyuenpoonchai (Klear)	Good
38	28 September 2016	Win Siriwong (Sqweez Animal)	Good
39	5 October 2016	Thanida Thamwimon	Good
40	12 October 2016	Anusorn Maneeted (Armchair)	Bad
Special	16 November 2016	Memorial Showcase	
41	23 November 2016	Kanikul Netbute	Bad
42	30 November 2016	Krissada Sukosol Clapp	Good
43	7 December 2016	Anchalee Jongkadeekij	Good
44	14 December 2016	Mr. Team	Good
45	21 December 2016	Jennifer Kim	Good
Special	28 December 2016	2016 Yearender Showcase	

2017 games
Episode		Guest artist	Winner
#	Date	Guest artist	Winner
46	4 January 2017	Patiparn Pataweekarn	Good
47	11 January 2017	Lula	Good
48	18 January 2017	Thaitanium	Good
49	25 January 2017	Kat English	Good
50	1 February 2017	Sirintip Hanpradit	Bad
51	8 February 2017	Sunaree Ratchasima	Good
52	15 February 2017	Palaphol Pholkongseng	Good
53	22 February 2017	Zeal	Good
54	1 March 2017	Atom Chanagun	Good
55	8 March 2017	Dax (Big Ass)	Good
56	15 March 2017	Nicole Theriault	Bad
57	22 March 2017	Thanakrit Panichwid	Good
58	29 March 2017	Labanoon	Good
59	5 April 2017	Season Five	Good
60	12 April 2017	Chirasak Panphum	Good
61	19 April 2017	Sunita Leetikul	Good
62	26 April 2017	Nuengthida Sophon	Good
63	3 May 2017	Rhatha Phongam	Good
64	10 May 2017	Issara Kitnitchi (Note: Season highlight: Issara Kitnitchi (ep. 64) also played under his "Durian" persona unmasked after winning the 1st season of The Masked Singer.)	Good
65	17 May 2017	Haruthai Muangboonsri	Good
66	24 May 2017	Slot Machine	Good
67	31 May 2017	Jirayuth Wattanasin	Good
68	7 June 2017	Fon Tanasoontorn	Good
69	14 June 2017	Tik Shiro	Good
70	21 June 2017	Yuthapong Sangsuwan (Kala)	Good
71	28 June 2017	Seksan Sukpimai (Loso)	Bad
72	5 July 2017	Chaiya Mitchai	Good
73	12 July 2017	Touch Na Takuatung	Bad
74	19 July 2017	Mai Charoenpura	Bad
75	26 July 2017	Worakarn Rojanawat	Good
76	2 August 2017	Wichayanee Pearklin	Good
77	9 August 2017	Nantida Kaewbuasai	Good

=== Panelists ===
Legend:
Regular panelist
Additional panelist
Guest panelist

Apps		Panelists in attendance (Sorted by first appearance, with episode designations)
g#	p#	Panelists in attendance (Sorted by first appearance, with episode designations)
74	1	Jakkawal Saothongyuttitum (1–17, 19–31, 33–74, 76–77)
64	1	Maneenuch Smerasut (1–6, 8–35, 37–40, 42–47, 52, 54–62, 65–66, 70–77)
57	1	Thanawat Prasitsomporn (1–2, 6–10, 12–17, 19–27, 33, 35–37, 39–70)
10	2	Nalin Hohler (1, 8, 20, 23, 29, 32, 37–38, 46, 54); Nilubon Amonwitthawat (16, 43, 60, 66–67, 71, 73–75, 77)
9	1	Nutpawin Kulkalyadee (5, 19, 22, 27, 32, 34, 38, 46, 59)
8	1	Pimchanok Ponlabhun (7, 10, 26, 33–34, 39, 41, 43)
7	2	Phantila Fooklin (6, 13, 28, 31, 33, 49, 56); Ngo Rotsukhon (8, 36, 41, 48, 51, 67, 69)
6	3	Jack Chern-yim (6, 10, 29, 35, 45, 73); Kapol Thongplub (19, 36, 47, 60, 64, 68); Phattharawadee Pinthong (24, 40, 48, 51, 73, 75)
5	5	Thanatchaphan Buranachiwawilai (3, 21, 26, 49, 66); Pongpisuth Pue-on (4, 9, 30, 52, 57); Siriporn Yooyord (32, 51, 53, 55, 64); Sakuntala Thianphairot (41–42, 45, 58, 76); Chawalit Simankhongtham (48, 53, 56, 69, 74)
4	4	Seo Ji-yeon (Note: Panelists' note: Foreign attendee: Seo Ji-yeon (ROK)) (22, 40, 55, 72); Leo Saussay (25, 58, 70–71); Apissada Kreurkongka (53, 61, 72, 74); Kohtee Aramboy (61–65)
3	5	Pawenuch Paengnakhon (15, 30, 52); Ratchawin Wongviriya (24, 39, 57); Nachat Janthapan (32, 54, 77); Yutthana Boonaom (49–50, 63); Darunee Sutiphitak (71, 76–77)
2	11	Nuttapong "Polo" Tangkasam (2, 20); Phimlada Chaiprichawit (4–5); Jeab Chern-yim (4, 72); Worachat "Plakung" Thammavichit (5, 16); Feawfao Sudswingringo (7, 59); Mintita Wattanakul (9, 67); Nithichai Yotamornsunthorn (11–12); Cheathavuth Watcharakun (14, 18); Sudarat Butrprom (17, 28); Nhong Chachacha (27, 34); Pataratida Patcharawirapong (44, 63); Morakot Sangtaweep (68, 70); Nattapong Chatipong (75–76)
1	33	Nida Patcharaveerapong (1); Peerapon "Ikkyu" Senakun (2); Warinda "Dada" Damrongphol and Trin "Komen" Ruangkitratanakul (3); Inthira Yeunyong (7); Phon Nopwichai and Pongphan Petchbuntoon (11); Sukonthawa Koetnimit (12); Chakrapong Siririn (Paradox) (13); Chonticha Nuamsukon (14); Patcha Anek-ayuwat (15); Ronnawee Sereerat (17); Primrata Dej-udom, Prakasit Bowsuwan, and Pharanyu Rojanawuthitham (18); Nipaporn Thititanakarn (21); Kiattisak Udomnak (23); Luckana Wattanawongsiri (25); Pokchat Thiamchai (30); Siwadol Janthasaewee and Chaleumpol Tikumpornteerawong (31); Thansita Suwatcharathanakit (35); Boriboon Chanrueng (36); Poj Arnon (37); Ood Pentor (38); Suttida Kasemsant na Ayutthaya (42); Thongthong Mokjok (63); Vivid Bavornkiratikajorn (47); Ornjira Lamwilai (62); Intira Jaroenpura and Kornkajath Manyatorn (65); Anuthira Wanthongtak (68); Sirapassara Sintrakarnphol (Gaia) (69); Chirasak Panphum (75)
