= I Can See Your Voice Thailand season 2 =

Television game show season

I Can See Your Voice Thailand
- Season 2
- Starring: Nilubon Amonwitthawat; Nattapong Chatipong; Chirasak Panphum; Techin Ploypetch; Thanawat Prasitsomporn; Jakkawal Saothongyuttitum; Maneenuch Smerasut; Darunee Sutiphitak; Kapol Thongplub; Kiattisak Udomnak
- Hosted by: Somkiat Chanpram; Kan Kantathavorn
- Winners: Good singers: 51; Bad singers: 13
- No. of episodes: 64

Release
- Original network: Workpoint TV
- Original release: 16 August 2017 – 14 November 2018

Season chronology
- ← Previous; Season 1 Next → Season 3

The second season of the Thai television mystery music game show I Can See Your Voice Thailand premiered on Workpoint TV on 16 August 2017.

== Gameplay ==
=== Format ===
According to the original South Korean rules, the guest artist(s) must attempt to eliminate bad singers during its game phase. At the final performance, the last remaining mystery singer is revealed as either good or bad by means of a duet between them and one of the guest artists.

=== Rounds ===
1. Visual round
  The guest artist is given some time to observe and examine each mystery singer based on their appearance. Afterward, a muted video of each mystery singer that reveals only 0.3 seconds of their singing voice is played as an additional hint.
2. Introduction round
  Each mystery singer self-introduces to guest artist and panelists. Good singers are telling the truth, while bad singers are allowed to lie.
3. Lip sync round
  Each mystery singer performs a lip sync to a song; good singers mime to a recording of their own, while bad singers mime to a backing track by another vocalist.
4. 1. Interrogation round (eps. 1—18)
  The guest artist may ask questions to the remaining mystery singers. Good singers are required to give truthful responses, while the bad singers must lie.
4. 2. Talent round
  The guest artist must describe one of the mystery singer's other talents, except "singing" itself. This may not be related to the "stage of truth", but depends on their identity.

== Episodes ==
=== Guest artists ===
Legend:
Good singer
Bad singer

2017 games
Episode		Guest artist (Note: Players' note: For the returning guest artists (who also include foreigners and former good singers), names are displayed in italics.)	Winner
#	Date	Guest artist	Winner
1	16 August 2017	Got7 (Note: Season highlights: Foreign guest artists: AKB48 (JPN; ep. 59) and Got7 (ROK s4; ep. 1); B5 (ep. 22) designated as new players, which include the returning Saksit Vejsupaporn.; Sao Sao Sao (ep. 60) designated as new players, which include the returning Saowalak Leelabut.)	Good
2	23 August 2017	Ruangsak Loychusak	Good
3	30 August 2017	Saowalak Leelabut	Good
4	6 September 2017	Nat Myria	Good
5	13 September 2017	Pai Pongsatorn	Good
6	20 September 2017	Preeti Barameeanant (Clash)	Good
7	27 September 2017	Siriporn Yooyord	Bad
8	4 October 2017	Jazz Chuanchuen	Bad
9	11 October 2017	Napassorn Phuthornjai and Piyanut Sueajongpru	Good
10	1 November 2017	Panadda Ruangwut	Bad
11	8 November 2017	Arnon Saisangchan	Good
12	15 November 2017	Muzu	Good
13	22 November 2017	Waii Panyarisa	Bad
14	29 November 2017	Tanatat Chaiyaat	Good
15	6 December 2017	Potato	Good
16	13 December 2017	UrboyTJ	Good
17	20 December 2017	Jetset'er	Good
18	27 December 2017	Nararak Jaibumrung	Good

2018 games
Episode		Guest artist	Winner
#	Date	Guest artist	Winner
19	3 January 2018	Inthira Yeunyong	Good
20	10 January 2018	Buddha Bless	Good
21	17 January 2018	Tattoo Colour	Good
22	24 January 2018	B5	Good
23	31 January 2018	Tai Tanawut	Good
24	7 February 2018	Apaporn Nakornsawan	Bad
25	14 February 2018	Triumphs Kingdom	Good
26	21 February 2018	Tachaya Prathumwan	Bad
27	28 February 2018	China Dolls	Good
28	7 March 2018	Palmy	Bad
29	14 March 2018	Zack Chumphae	Good
30	21 March 2018	Samran Chuaichamnaek (Fly)	Bad
31	28 March 2018	Supol Phuasirirak	Good
32	4 April 2018	Mum Jokmok	Good
33	11 April 2018	25 Hours	Good
34	18 April 2018	Peerapat Tenwong	Good
35	25 April 2018	Piya Satrawaha	Good
36	2 May 2018	Tai Orathai	Good
37	9 May 2018	BNK48	Good
38	16 May 2018	Atom Chanagun	Good
39	23 May 2018	Pongkool Suebsung	Bad
40	30 May 2018	Cham Chamrum	Good
41	6 June 2018	Kiattisak Udomnak	Bad
42	13 June 2018	Joey Boy	Bad
43	20 June 2018	Pisanut Boonyuen	Good
44	27 June 2018	Thanwa Boonsungnern	Good
45	4 July 2018	Tanont Chumroen	Good
46	11 July 2018	Mild	Good
47	18 July 2018	Choi Rueammit	Good
48	25 July 2018	Takkatan Chonlada	Good
49	1 August 2018	Nat Sakdatorn	Good
50	8 August 2018	Yinglee Seejumphon	Good
51	15 August 2018	Pramote Pathan	Good
52	22 August 2018	Jirayu La-ongmanee	Good
53	29 August 2018	Ronnadet Wongsaroj	Good
54	5 September 2018	Pongsak Rattanapong	Good
55	12 September 2018	Jennifer Kim	Good
56	19 September 2018	Unnop Thongborisut	Good
57	26 September 2018	Natthawut Jenmana	Good
58	3 October 2018	Rueangrit Siriphanit	Good
59	10 October 2018	AKB48	Good
60	17 October 2018	Sao Sao Sao	Bad
61	24 October 2018	Nuengthida Sophon	Good
62	31 October 2018	Warawut Poyim	Good
63	7 November 2018	D2B (Worrawech Danuwong and Kawee Tanjararak)	Bad
64	14 November 2018	Thanasit Jaturaput	Good

=== Panelists ===
Legend:
Regular panelist
Additional panelist
Guest panelist

Apps		Panelists in attendance (Sorted by first appearance, with episode designations)
g#	p#	Panelists in attendance (Sorted by first appearance, with episode designations)
59	1	Maneenuch Smerasut (1–21, 28–31, 34–64)
34	1	Jakkawal Saothongyuttitum (1–3, 5, 10–17, 20–21, 24–26, 34–41, 43–44, 47–48, 53–60)
24	1	Darunee Sutiphitak (3–5, 11, 13, 18, 30–31, 34–37, 46–49, 51–55, 58, 61, 63)
21	1	Techin Ploypetch (12–15, 17, 28–29, 38–41, 46–47, 53–54, 56, 59–63)
13	2	Thanawat Prasitsomporn (1–3, 6–7, 10–11, 22, 25, 27, 32–33, 57); Chirasak Panphum (8–9, 18–19, 22–29, 33)
12	1	Nilubon Amonwitthawat (7, 10, 14, 20, 25, 28, 39, 45, 56–57, 60, 64)
11	2	Kapol Thongplub (7–8, 11, 18–19, 23, 30, 39, 41, 52, 60); Kiattisak Udomnak (19–20, 26, 30–31, 37, 40, 49, 61–63)
10	1	Nattapong Chatipong (1, 22–23, 30–31, 34–35, 52–53, 55)
7	2	Nalin Hohler (2, 8–9, 40–42, 45); Nachat Janthapan (4, 8–9, 14, 36, 49, 54)
6	2	Pisanu Nimsakul (12–13, 46, 55, 57, 61); Siriporn Yooyord (18, 22–24, 44, 51)
5	3	Apissada Kreurkongka (1, 4, 6, 9, 23); Seo Ji-yeon (Note: Panelists' note: Foreign attendee: Seo Ji-yeon (ROK)) (1, 16, 19, 42, 58); Chaleumpol Tikumpornteerawong (16, 43–44, 50–51)
4	2	Chawalit Simankhongtham (17, 29, 42, 59); Phattharawadee Pinthong (33, 43–44, 48)
3	5	Leo Saussay (2, 5, 14); Saksit Vejsupaporn (4, 6–7); Nattawat Srimawk (6, 10, 20); Saranyu Winaipanit (38, 62–63); Napapa Tantrakul (38, 50, 64)
2	4	Prachakorn Piyasakulkaew (3, 5); Sireeporn Yoogthatat (17, 62); Boriboon Chanrueng (33, 48); Chinawut Indracusin (46, 52)
1	37	Panisa Udomraungkiet (Gaia) (1); Puttachat Pongsuchat (8); Sakuntala Thianphairot (12); Sukonthawa Koetnimit (15); Natee Ekwijit (Buddha Bless) (16); Benjapol Cheuyaroon and Yingyong Yodbuangam (24); Nitidon Pomsuwan (25); Primrata Dej-udom and Feawfao Sudswingringo (26); Intira Jaroenpura, Sakaojai Poonsawat, and Pongpisuth Pue-on (27); Thikamporn Ritta-apinan (28); Utsanee Watthana (29); Peerapat Tenwong (31); Anusorn Maneeted (Armchair), Daraneenuch Photipiti, Morakot Sangtaweep, and Theng Therdtherng (32); Yani Chongwisut (33); Kawee Tanjararak (34); Nida Patcharaveerapong (35); Panadda Ruangwut (36); Tachakorn Boonlupyanun (37); UrboyTJ (42); Jirayu La-ongmanee (43); Phon Nopwichai and Peerapat Tenwong (45); Yuthana Puengklarng (47); Tai Tanawut (50); Apiwat Eurthavornsuk (51); Sirisin Chotvijit (56); Rusameekae Fagerlund (58); Nat Sakdatorn (59); Vivid Bavornkiratikajorn and Kirati Thepthan (64)
