= White Music (record label) =

Thai record label

- Parent company: GMM Grammy (2011-2023); GMM Music (2023-present)
- Founded: 1 January 2011 (15 years ago)
- Distributor: GMM Music
- Genre: Pop
- Country of origin: Thailand
- Location: Bangkok, Thailand

White Music (Thai: ไวท์มิวสิก, also known as White Music Record) is a Thai record label and a subsidiary of GMM Grammy that focuses on pop music genre. The label's current acts include Palitchoke Ayanaputra (Peck), Pongkool Suebsung (Pop), Chanakan Rattana-udom (Atom) and Getsunova. Its current managing director is Rattakorn Noiprasit.

== Roster ==
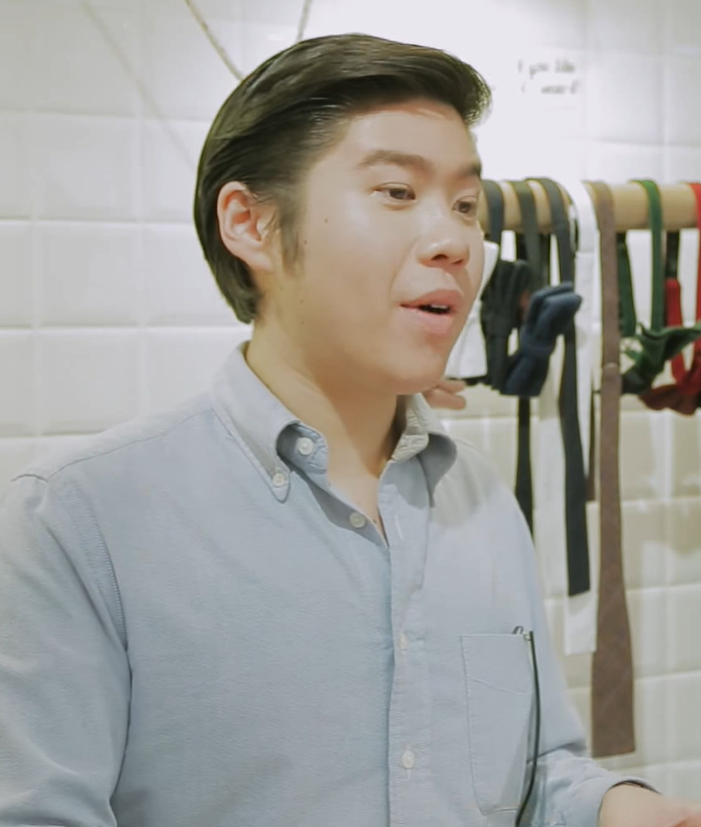
Chanakan Rattana-udom

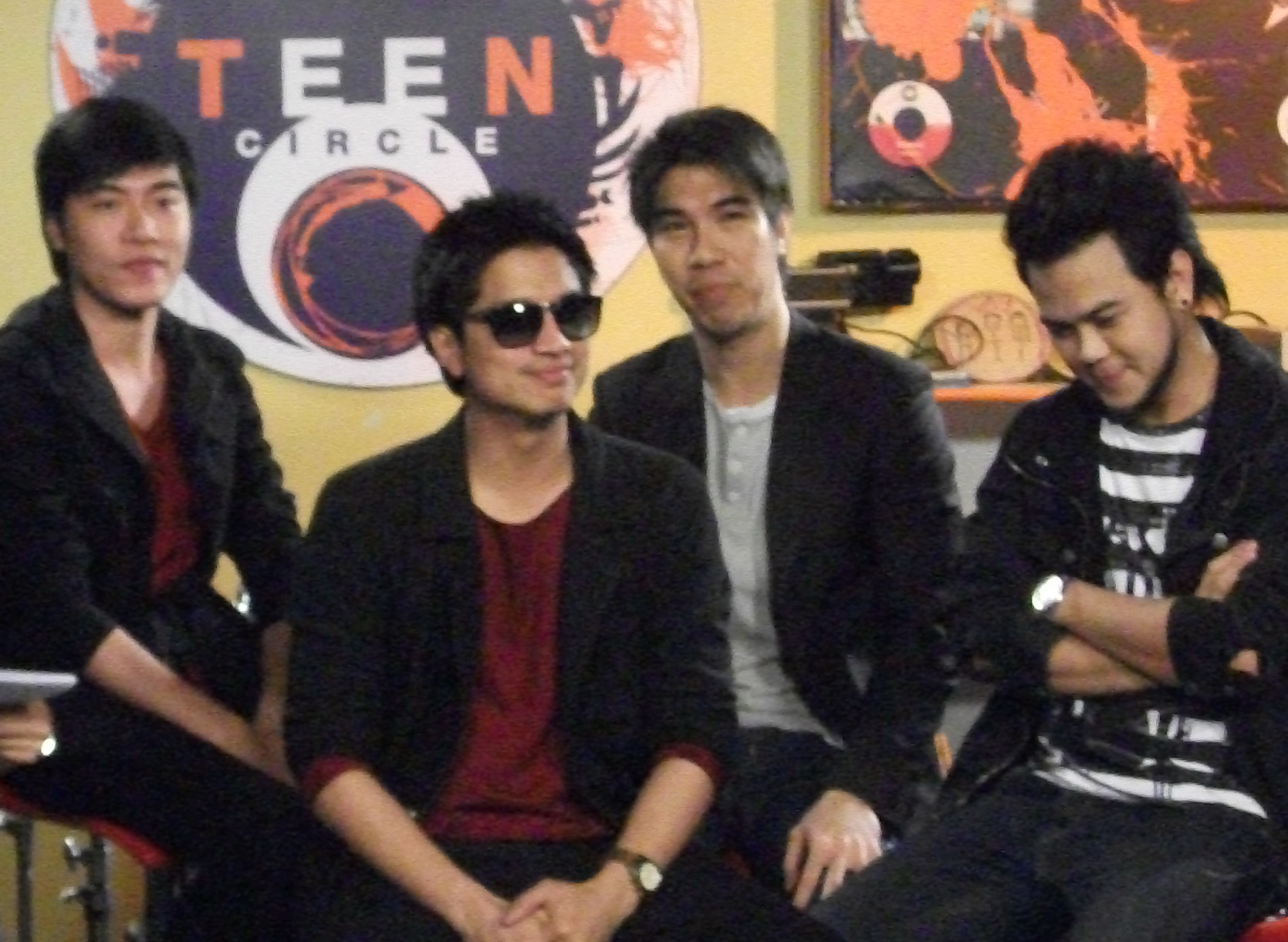
Jetset'er

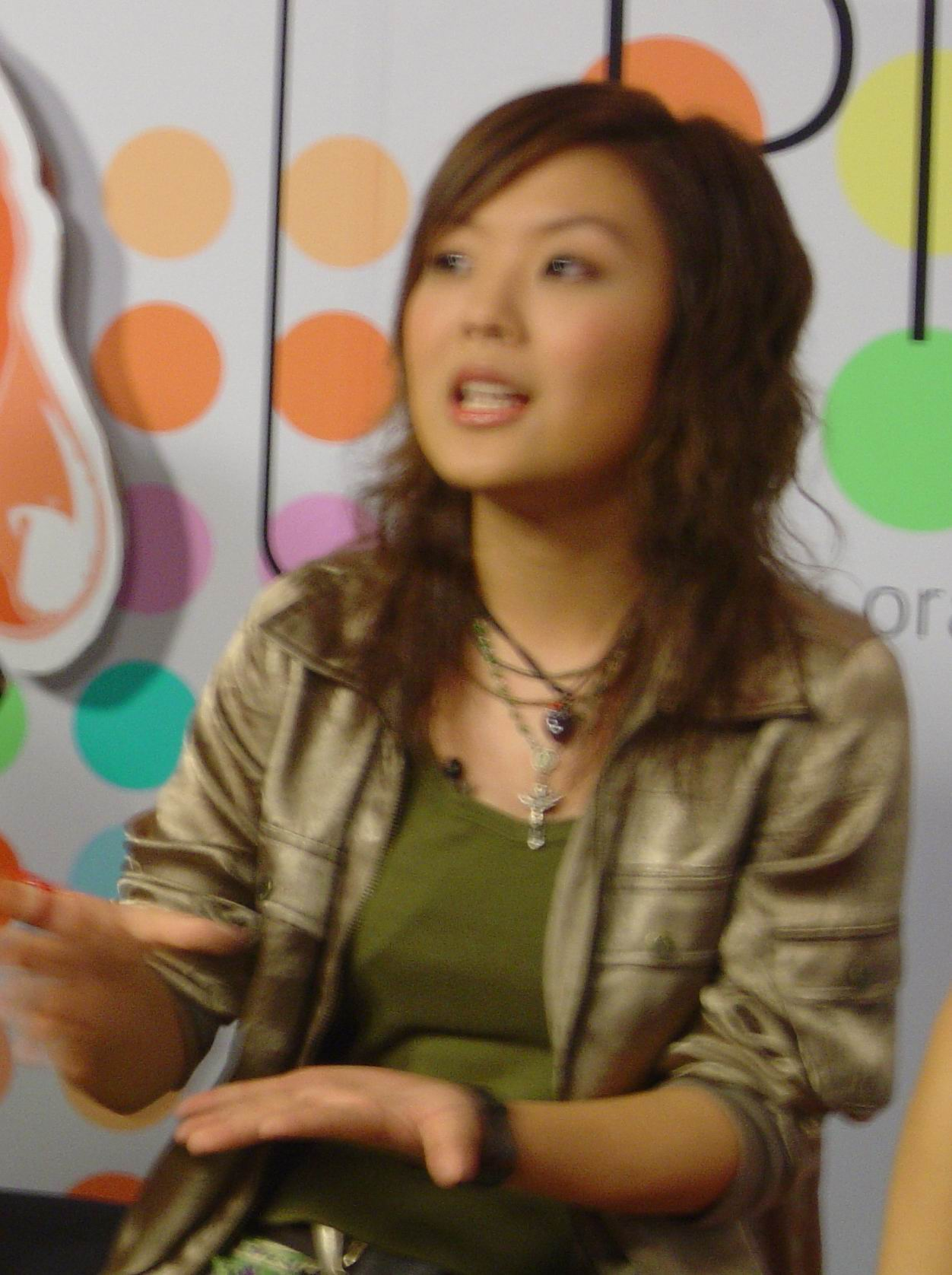
Lula

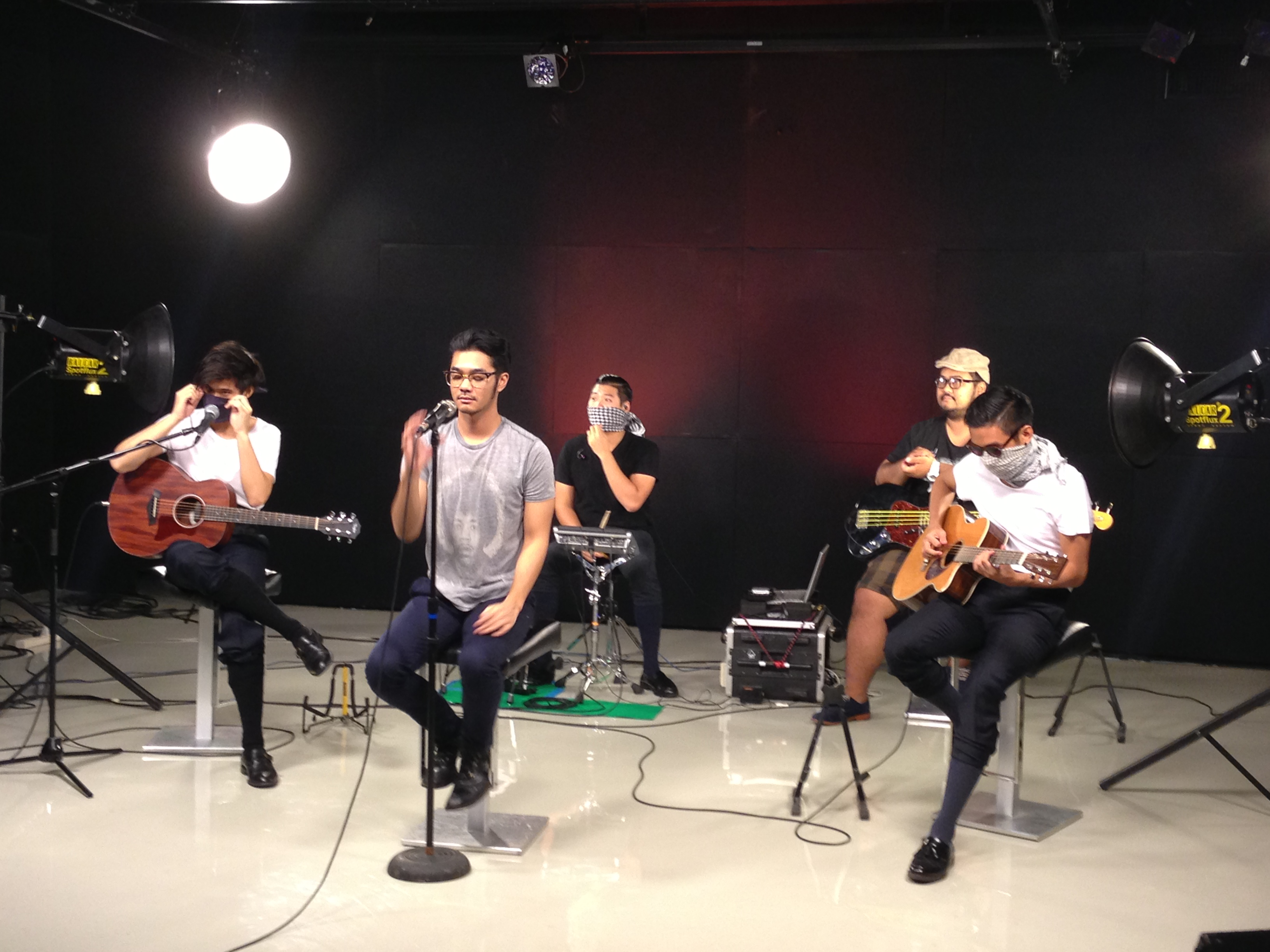
Getsunova

=== Current acts ===
- Pongkool Suebsung (Pop)
- Lula
- Supol Phuasirirak (Bell)
- Muzu
- Chanakan Rattana-udom
- Getsunova
- Jetset'er
- Pattarasaya Yongrattanamongkol (Mint)
- Praput Pimpama (Opor)
- Palitchoke Ayanaputra (Peck)
- Kanitkul Nedtabud (Praw)
- Sin Singular of Singular
- Yanin Phanthai (Ai)
- Deun Chongmankhong
- Pophatson Han (Weiwei)
- Chisanucha Tantimedh (MeYou)

=== Former acts ===
- Thongchai McIntyre (Bird)
- Thanida Tumvimol
- Marsha Vadhanapanich
- Palmy
- Ronnadet Wongsaroj (Namm)
- Peerapat Tenwong (Be)
- Patravee Srisuntisuk (Earth)
- Jannine Weigel (Ploychompoo)
- Chaiamorn Kaewwiboonpan (Ammy The Bottom Blues)
- Pramote Pathan (Oat)

== Concerts ==
Concert name	Date(s)	Venue	Ref.
WhiteHaus Concert	10 September 2016	GMM Live House, CentralWorld	
WhiteHaus 2: 4 Chairs Concert	15–16 September 2017	GMM Live House, CentralWorld	
WhiteHaus 3: Time Traveler Concert	21–22 September 2019	Royal Paragon Hall, Siam Paragon	
