= Hijack (Thai band) =

Thai boy band

- Origin: Bangkok, Thailand
- Genres: Pop; Dance-pop; Dancerock
- Years active: 1992–1994, 2017
- Label: RS Promotion
- Past members: Jaturong "X" Kolimart; Phiraphan "Phi" Kumarasith; Apichart "Toi" Kaimook; Phichai "James" Unakul

Hijack (Thai: ไฮแจ็ค) was a Thai boy band famous and popular in the 1990s under RS Promotion. They are the first boy band of RS label.

== History ==
All four members of this band were former dancers who were used as back-up dancers for many singers. Even as dancers for Christina Aguilar, a famous singer from Grammy Entertainment, the label that was a major competitor of RS, in a performance during the half-time of the Miss Thailand pageant at Sofitel Centara Grand Bangkok in 1991. Hijack was the first boy band of RS Promotion.

The band released two studio albums in 1993 and 1994, and a one-off special album with the Raptor.

While promoting the release of their third studio album, band member Phi–Phiraphan seriously injured his foot. Because of this they decided to eventually split up.

During their most famous period Hijack had been interviewed by two foreign media companies; NHK of Japan and Singapore MTV. They were compared with Shonentai, the famous Japanese boy band of the same period.

In 2017 Hijack had reunion in "Por Lor Ruk Lae Kid Tung" (ปล. รักและคิดถึง) as part of A-pop Bunterng 34 TV Program on Amarin TV channel.

== Member ==
- Jaturong "X" Kolimart (เอ็กซ์: จตุรงค์ โกลิมาศ)
- Phiraphan "Phi" Kumarasith (ผี: พีรพันธุ์ กุมารสิทธิ์)
- Apichart "Toi" Kaimook (ต๋อย: อภิชาติ ไข่มุกข์)
- Phichai "James" Unakul (เจมส์: พิชัย อูนากุล)

== Discography ==
Studio albums

- Form Lon Mai Tong Keb (ฟอร์มหล่นไม่ต้องเก็บ) 1993
- Len Jeb Jeb (เล่นเจ็บเจ็บ) 1994

Compilation albums

- R.S. Unplugged 1994
- Compilation with Raptor (with special single Ya Kid Wa Ther Mai Mee Kari; อย่าคิดว่าเธอไม่มีใคร) 1994

== Filmography ==
- The Magic Shoes (รองต๊ะแล่บแปล๊บ) (lead role by Touch Na Takuatung directed by Prachya Pinkaew) March 14, 1992

=== Dramas ===
Year	Thai title	Title	Role	With	ผลิตโดย	Network	Past members
2013	เสือสั่งฟ้า 2 พยัคฆ์ผยอง	Suea Sung Fah II: Payak Payong	รองอธิบดีอำนวย (); Deputy Director General Amnuay ()		Kantana Group	Channel 7	Jaturong Kolimart (X)
2017	มหาหิน	Maha Hin	พายุ (รุ่นพี่นายลม) (รับเชิญ); Pa u()		Coliseum Intergroup	Channel 7	Jaturong Kolimart (X)
2020	ชุมแพ	Chumpae	จ่างึม สำรวม () ()		Arlong Group	Channel 3	Jaturong Kolimart (X)
2020	เพรงลับแล	Preng Lap Lae	กำนันถนอม (หนอม) (พ่อสันต์); Kamnan Thanom ()	Darin Hansen	Kiatrapee	Channel 8	Jaturong Kolimart (X)
2020	สัตยาธิษฐาน	Sattayathitthan	หลวงมนูญวงศา (คุณพัน) () ()		Broadcast Thai Television	Channel 3	Jaturong Kolimart (X)
2020	เมียอาชีพ	Mia Archeep	วันชัย (วัน) (พ่อพุฒิ); Onechai ()	Waadsanaa Phoonphon	Step Power 3	Channel 3	Jaturong Kolimart (X)
2020	สิงห์สั่งป่า	Singh Sang Pa	เสือผิว () ()		Sawasdee Vision	Channel 7	Jaturong Kolimart (X)
2020	เพลิงภริยา	Phariya	เลอศักดิ์ (ศักดิ์) (พ่อสุอารีย์ (แต้ว)) (รับเชิญ) ()		Deemak Production	Channel 8	Jaturong Kolimart (X)
2021	เมียจำเป็น	Mere Jum Pen	แหยม (); Yaem ()		D One TV	Channel 3	Jaturong Kolimart (X)
2021	เรือนร่มงิ้ว	Reuan Rom Ngiw	เพิ่ม (พี่ชายรำเพย); Peim ()		Montage Entertainment	Channel 8	Jaturong Kolimart (X)
2021	หลงกลิ่นจันทน์	Lhong Klin Chan	พ.ต.อ.พนา บริรักษ์ (ผู้กำกับพนา) (พ่อทางไท); Phana Borirak ()		Prakotkarndee	Channel 7	Jaturong Kolimart (X)
2022	สายเปล		แคล้ว () ()		Papassara Production	Channel 7	Jaturong Kolimart (X)
2023	เพลิงไพร	Plerng Prai	ผกก.ไพศาล เพชรทวี (); Paisan Pechthawee ()		Media Studio	Channel 7	Jaturong Kolimart (X)
2023	ป่านางเสือ	Pah Nang Suer	(รับเชิญ) ()		D One TV	Channel 3	Jaturong Kolimart (X)

=== Series ===
Year	Thai title	Title	Role	With	ผลิตโดย	Network	Past members
2010	เซน...สื่อรักสื่อวิญญาณ ตอน วิกฤตศรัทธา		พฤกษ์ (รับเชิญ)			Channel 5	Jaturong Kolimart (X)
2013	สุภาพบุรุษจุฑาเทพ เรื่อง คุณชายรณพีร์	Suphapburut Juthathep#Khun Chai Ronapee	พ่อของประณต (รับเชิญ); Pranod's Father (Cameo)		METTA & MAHANIYOM	Channel 3	Jaturong Kolimart (X)
2016	กรุงเทพ..มหานครซ้อนรัก		เอ็กซ์ (รับเชิญ)		เอ็กแซ็กท์-th:ซีเนริโอ	One 31	Jaturong Kolimart (X)
2019	ลูกผู้ชาย : ภูผา	The Man Series	นพ.ทินราช พิทักษ์กิจ (ผอ.) ()		Sonix Boom 2013	Channel 3	Jaturong Kolimart (X)
