= The Magic Shoes (1992 film) =

- Film poster
- Thai: รองต๊ะแล่บแปล๊บ
- Directed by: Prachya Pinkaew
- Written by: Prachya Pinkaew; Nongnuch Chavala; Chanikarn Wannarot
- Produced by: Nisit Koonphon
- Starring: Touch Na Takuathung; Watsana Phunphon; Boriboon Chanrueng; Jaturong Kolimart; Hijack members; Panudej Wattanasuchart
- Cinematography: Prachya Pinkaew
- Edited by: Prachya Pinkaew
- Music by: Mongkolpat Thongrueang
- Production company: RS Promotion
- Distributed by: RS Promotion
- Release date: March 14, 1992
- Running time: 116 minutes
- Country: Thailand
- Language: Thai

The Magic Shoes (Thai: รองต๊ะแล่บแปล๊บ or Rawng tah laep plaep) is a Thai 1992 fantasy dance film directed, edited, and co-written by Prachya Pinkaew.

== Plot ==
The film tells the story of Touch, a young man who loves dance. One day, he possessed a pair of sneakers that had the super power created by lightning. They made him a fiery dancer overnight.

== Cast ==
- Touch Na Takuathung as Touch (main character)
- Watsana Phunphon as Ann (Touch love interest)
- Boriboon Chanrueng as Tuk (Touch younger brother)
- Jaturong Kolimart as X (Touch main dancer rival and younger brother of Duke)
- Panudej Wattanasuchart as Duke (influential millionaire and lover of Ann – cameo)

== Production ==
The film is based on the fame and popularity of Touch Na Takuathung, a pop dance star of RS Promotion in the 1990s. It was Prachya Pinkaew's debut film, by which time he had already directed music videos for several artists under RS Promotion, such as Chatchai Plengpanich and the heavy metal band Hi-Rock, before becoming world famous with the martial arts film Ong-Bak: Muay Thai Warrior in 2003.

It is also the first film produced and distributed by RS Promotion (before the establishment of RS Film), and the debut of some performers, such as Boriboon Chanrueng, Watsana Phunphon and the boyband Hijack.

Its Thai title Rawng tah laep plaep is slang that probably means "flashing shoes".

== Music ==
=== Original soundtrack ===
The Magic Shoes

Soundtrack album by Various artists
- Released: April 1, 1992
- Studio: RS Promotion
- Genres: Pop dance, soundtrack
- Length: 32:48
- Label: RS Promotion
- Producer: Mongkolpat Thongrueang

The film's soundtracks were composed and produced by Mongkolpat Thongrueang, a key producer of RS Promotion and Na Takuathung's trusted producer, assist by Thanapol Intharit, another key personnel of RS label.

The Magic Shoes
No.	Title	Length
1.	"SU ("fight")"	4:21
2.	"Yark Roo Kwam Jing ("want to know the truth")"	3:53
3.	"Done Joo Jome ("attacked")"	4:20
4.	"Phitwang Lae Kamlangchai" ("disappointment and encouragement")" (backing track)	4:11
5.	"Mhod Jai ("be depressed")"	4:01
6.	"Koet Ma Phuea Thoe ("born for you")" (performed by Watsana Phunphon)	3:47
7.	"Mai Luea Arai lk ("nothing left")"	3:57
8.	"SU ("fight")" (RE-MIX)	5:38
