= Youngohm =

Thai rapper (born 1998)

- ยังโอม
- Youngohm in 2026
- Born: Ratthaphong Phoorisit; 24 October 1998 (age 28); Bangkok, Thailand
- Other names: Ohm; Young Ill; Rap Star
- Occupations: Rapper; singer; songwriter; actor; activist
- Musical career
- Genre: Hip-hop
- Years active: 2015–present
- Label: Independent
- Member of: Already Deadd

Ratthaphong Phoorisit (Thai: รัธพงศ์ ภูรีสิทธิ์; born 24 October 1998), known professionally as Youngohm (Thai: ยังโอม), is a Thai rapper, singer, and songwriter known for his hit songs like "Doo White", "Choey Moei", and "Thararat." He is one of the leading figures in Thailand's hip-hop scene, blending catchy melodies with street-inspired lyrics.

== Early life ==
Ratthaphong Phoorisit was born on 24 October 1998 in Bangkok. He studied at Wat That Thong School. He was later accepted as a student in the performing arts program at the Faculty of Fine Arts, Srinakharinwirot University, but decided to leave after only half a day of studying.

== Career ==
During his early secondary school years, he began listening to hip-hop music and writing his own rap lyrics. By high school, he started recording songs in studios and posting them on social media. The stage name "Youngohm" was inspired by Western rappers who often used the word "Young" before their names, which he then combined with his nickname "Ohm".

He and his friends participated in the second season of Rap is Now, a Thai battle rap competition show, and reached the round of 32 contestants. In 2016, during the show's third season, Youngohm returned to compete again and reached the final eight contestants. Although he did not win, his performance helped him gain recognition within the Thai rap community.

In 2017, Youngohm rose to fame with his hit single "Choey Moei", which reached number one on the Joox chart. That same year, he collaborated with Wonderframe on the song “Yoo Dee Dee Kor.”

In 2018, Youngohm received the Hip-Hop Song of the Year award at the Joox Thailand Music Awards for "Choey Moei". He also featured in the songs "Roo Dee Wa Mai Dee" by Getsunova and "Suea Sin Lai" by F.Hero, FYMME, and P–Hot.

In 2019, Youngohm released "Do White", which surpassed 55 million views within its first two weeks. Later, his song "Thararat" broke records on the Joox platform, reaching one million streams in just 15 hours and 23 million YouTube views in its first week.

In 2022, Youngohm revealed that he had been diagnosed with bipolar disorder. The following year, he released his second studio album, Thatthong Sound, and held the album launch on 25 January at Gaysorn Urban Resort, Gaysorn Village. He later held his first major solo concert in February of the same year.

== Artistry ==
About 95% of Youngohm's songs are based on his own life experiences. According to The Standard, his lyrics are sharp, aggressive, and occasionally vulgar, avoiding unnecessary embellishments. Some of his songs provide conclusions, while others leave interpretations open, often requiring repeated listening to fully understand. Songs like "Thararat" and "Choey Moei" feature unique vocal phrasing, such as the opening line "ตอนนี้ยังไม่ได้นอนเลยจะสิบโมงเช้า" (lit. 'I haven't slept yet, and it’s already almost 10 a.m.'), a style influenced by Illslick. In his early career, Youngohm also used an auto-tune for vocal adjustments, but he discontinued its use in his subsequent album.

== Views ==
Youngohm supported the 2020–2021 Thai protests and opposed the use of violence during the Pathum Wan intersection crackdown in Bangkok in 2020.

Additionally, his song lyrics often reflect freedom of speech, with direct political commentary embedded in many of his tracks.

== Discography ==
=== Single ===
- Choey Moey (2017)
- Doo White (2019)
- Thararat (2019)

=== Album ===
- Bangkok Legacy (2020)
- Thatthong Sound (2023)
- Fai Glang Khuen (2025)
