= Khon Uad Phee =

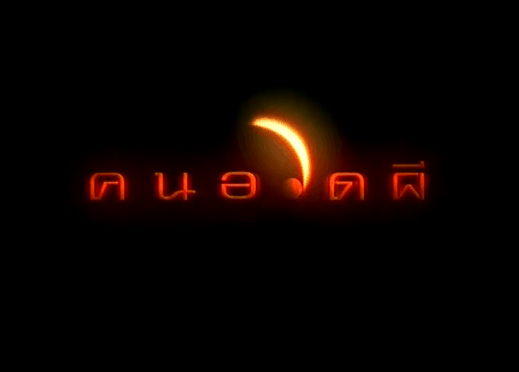
- Developed by: Workpoint Entertainment Public Co., Ltd.
- Starring: Krit Sripoomseth; Kapon Tongplub; Boriboon Chanrueng; Panrawat Limrattanaaphon; Chenchira Riabroicharoen; Pharanyu Rotchanawuthitham
- Country of origin: Thailand
- Original language: Thai

Production
- Camera setup: Multi-camera
- Running time: 60 - 80 minutes (since March 16, 2016)

Original release
- Network: CH7 Thailand; RTA 5 Thailand; Workpoint TV
- Release: November 3, 2010

Khon Uad Phee, GhostTV, Gang of Ghosts (Thai: คนอวดผี, RTGS: Khon Uat Phi, since November 3, 2010) or Man vs Ghost is a Thai variety talk show television programme about ghosts and life after death. It is one of the most famous ghost television programmes of Thailand. The sections of television programme: Clip Battle, Soon Bantao Tuk Phee (Ghost and karma solution by supernatural belief), La Tha Phee (Ghost Hunter) and Kho Kid Chak Khun Riew

== Broadcast ==
=== 2010–2011 ===
Via Channel 7 by Workpoint Entertainment. Airdates on November 3, 2010, until December 28, 2011, 11.05 PM. - 01.05 AM. (UTC+7)

=== 2012–2014 ===
Via Channel 5 by Workpoint Entertainment. Airdates since January 4, 2012 10.35 PM. - 00.20 AM. (UTC+7)

=== 2015–present ===
Via Workpoint TV by Workpoint Entertainment. Airdates since January 7, 2015

== Television moderators ==
=== Main (hosts) ===
- Krit Sripoomseth (Krit)
- Kapon Tongplub (Pong)
- Boriboon Chanrueng (Tuk)
- Panrawat Limrattanaaphon (Riew)
- Chenchira Riabroicharoen (Jane)
- Pharanyu Rotchanawuthitham (Taek)

=== Guest ===
- Nong Choosak Eamsuk (replaced Tuk Boriboon) (November 10 and 17, 2010)
- Gift Wattana Kamthonthip (replaced Tuk Boriboon) (December 1, 2010)
- Gung Worrachat Thammawichin (replaced Tuk Boriboon) (November 2, 2011)

== Sections of programme ==
=== Clip Battle ===
Three moderators (Krit, Pong and Tuk) bring each own clip see the ghost in Thailand or other countries to compete. Whose least one will be punished. In several week, it may be have a clip from Thailand people that he will get 5,000 baht.

==== Clip from Thailand ====
Airdate	Clip name	From	Address
November 17, 2010	Frightened Drive Motorcycle	Thepsuthorn Mongkon	—N/a
February 23, 2011	Medical Students	Daralak Wangkawong	—N/a
July 13, 2011	Kuman thong	Nisachon Nuwari	Nong Khai Province
January 18, 2012	Need Merit	Supattra Pongutta	Phra Nakhon Si Ayutthaya Province
January 25, 2012	Hiding Ghost	Damrongsak Saeiaw	Bangkok
February 1, 2012	New Friend	Sitthikorn Nualrod	Nakhon Si Thammarat Province
February 15, 2012	Lighting Ghost	Wiwat Muennamo	Chiang Rai Province
March 7, 2012	Ghost Toilet	Panaporn Paisan	Mae Hong Son Province
April 18, 2012	Special Cheer	Panya Pipatchavalitkul	Bangkok
April 25, 2012	Mystery Shadow	Wong Duen O-noo	Nong Bua Lamphu Province
May 30, 2012	Mystery Training Room	Jiraporn Attanat	Kalasin Province
June 27, 2012	Death Curve	Winai Phonyiam	Phra Nakhon Si Ayutthaya Province
July 4, 2012	Mystery Shadow	Chutima Nguancharoen	Samut Prakan Province
July 11, 2012	Mystery Ghost	Phetrat Phumring	Samut Prakan Province
July 18, 2012	Attaching Ghost	Ekkasit Rakpong	Nonthaburi Province
July 25, 2012	Mystery Ghost	Sathiya Wongkrachang	Pathum Thani Province
August 8, 2012	Mystery Shadow	Kamonwan Aranchot	Khon Kaen Province
August 22, 2012	Mystery School	Kraiwit Charoenwanit	Chonburi Province
September 5, 2012	Frightening Story	Sirinat Chanpen	Bangkok
September 19, 2012	Last Spirit	Surasak Chuenchom	Songkhla Province
April 10, 2013	Mystery Ghost	Phitchayan Phimphisai	Bangkok
