= The X Factor Thailand =

Reality television competition program

- Genre: Reality television
- Created by: Simon Cowell
- Presented by: Krit Sripoomseth
- Judges: Nitipong Honark; Jennifer Kim; Saksit Vejsupaporn; Chalatit Tantiwut
- Country of origin: Thailand
- Original language: Thai
- No. of episodes: 16

Production
- Camera setup: Multi-camera
- Running time: 72-95 minutes
- Production companies: Workpoint Entertainment; Fremantle Media; Syco Entertainment

Original release
- Network: Workpoint TV
- Release: September 1 – December 18, 2017

Related
- The X Factor

The X Factor Thailand (Thai: ดิเอ็กซ์แฟกเตอร์ ไทยแลนด์) is reality television music competition to find new singing talent, contested by aspiring singers drawn from public auditions. It was first aired on September 1, 2017 and runs every Monday at 8:15 p.m. after broadcasting 3 episodes on Friday at 9:00 p.m.

== Format ==
=== Categories ===
The show is primarily concerned with identifying singing talent, though appearance, personality, stage presence and dance routines are also an important element of many performances. Each judge is assigned one of four categories: "Boys", "Girls", "Over 30s", and "Groups" (including duos). Through the live shows, the judges act as mentors to their category, helping to decide song choices, styling and staging, while judging contestants from other categories.

=== Stages ===
There are five stages to the competition:

- Stage 1: Auditions (these auditions decide who will sing in front of the judges)
- Stage 2: Boot camp
- Stage 3: Four-chair challenge
- Stage 4: Judges' houses
- Stage 5: Semi final
- Stage 6: Live shows (finals)

== Hosts and Judges ==
Judges	Season
Judges	1
Nitipong Honark	✔
Jennifer Kim	✔
Saksit Vejsupaporn	✔
Chalatit Tantiwut	✔
Hosts	Season
Hosts	1
Krit Sripoomseth	✔

== About auditions ==
Regions	Location	Data
Northern Thailand	CentralPlaza Chiang Mai Airport, Chiang Mai	May 13–14, 2017
Northern Thailand	Amarin Lagoon Hotel, Phitsanulok	May 13–14, 2017
Southern Thailand	Royal Phuket Marina, Phuket	May 20–21, 2017
Southern Thailand	Prince of Songkla University International Convention Center, Songkhla	May 20–21, 2017
Northeastern Region	CentralPlaza Khon Kaen, Khon Kaen	May 27–28, 2017
Northeastern Region	V-One Hotel Korat, Nakhon Ratchasima	May 27–28, 2017
Central Thailand	KBank Siam Pic-Ganesha, Siam Square One, Bangkok	June 9–11, 2017

== Series overview ==
Contestant in (or mentor of) "Boys" category
Contestant in (or mentor of) "Girls" category
Contestant in (or mentor of) "Over 30s" category
Contestant in (or mentor of) "Groups" category

Season	Start	Finish	Winner	Runner-up	Winning mentor	Host	Judges
1	September 1, 2017	18 December 2017	Slow	Natthapong "Kob" Yimmonkon	Kritima "Chaba" Jangsawad	Krit Sripoomseth	Nitipong Honark; Jennifer Kim; Saksit Vejsupaporn; Chalatit Tantiwut
