= Getsunova =

Thai pop band

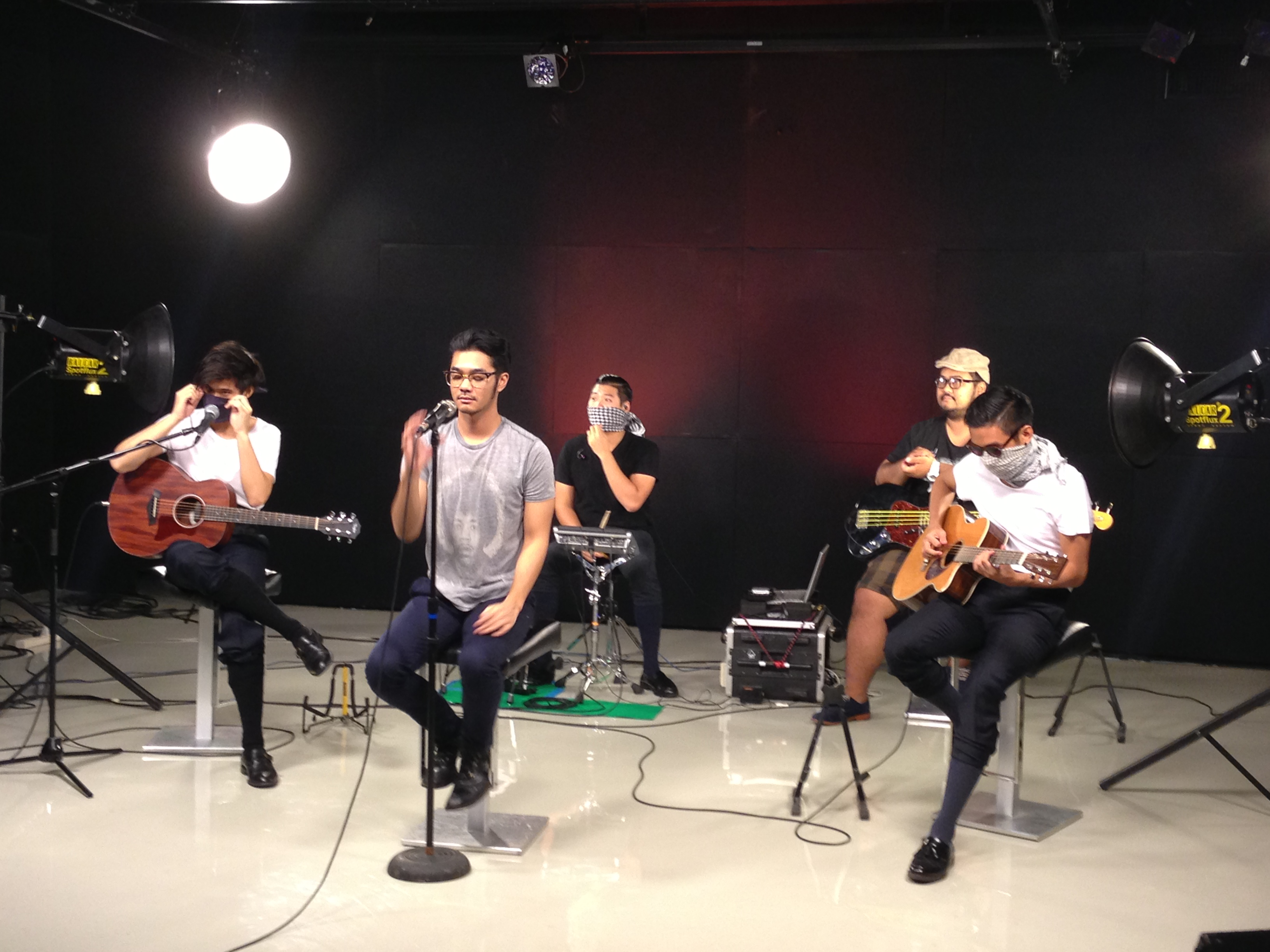
- Getsunova in 2013

Background information
- Origin: Bangkok, Thailand
- Genres: Pop rock; Experimental pop; Electronic rock
- Years active: 2008–present
- Label: Sanamluang (2008–2009); Duckbar (2009–2015); White Music (2015–present)
- Members: Prakarn Raiva; Natee Osathanugrah; Panoth Khunprasert; Komkadech Sangwattanaroj

Getsunova (Thai: เก็ตสึโนวา) is a Thai band under GMM Grammy, composed of Prakarn Raiva, Natee Osathanugrah, Panoth Khunprasert and Komkadech Sangwattanaroj. The band has been known for their popular hits such as "ไกลแค่ไหนคือใกล้" (Glai Kae Nai Kue Glai) (2012), "คำถามซึ่งไร้คนตอบ" (Kham Tham Seung Rai Khon Tob) (2013), "อยู่ตรงนี้ นานกว่านี้" (Yoo Trong Nee Naan Kwa Nee) (2014), and "พระเอกจำลอง" (Pra Ek Jum Laung) (2019).

== History ==
Prakarn Raiva, the heir of the S&P restaurant owner and a former soloist from GMM Grammy, invited his friends studying in the United Kingdom namely Natee Osathanugrah and Panoth Khunprasert, who also happen to be sons of tycoons, to form a band. Panoth later invited his friend, Komkadech Sangwattanaroj, to be the band's drummer. The band's name was formed by combining two words: "Getsu" which means moon in Japanese and "Nova" which is a nuclear explosion in a white dwarf star in English.

Initially, the band began rehearsing their music while studying in different locations: Prakarn and Panoth in the United Kingdom, Natee in the United States and Komkadech in Thailand. While this proved to be a challenge, they continued to produce their music through the internet. When the band members graduated, they eventually settled in Thailand to work together.

As the band released the song "ไกลแค่ไหน คือ ใกล้" (Glai Kae Nai Kue Glai) in 2012, it became a number one hit making them the first Thai band to reach 100 million views for three songs on YouTube, including "คำถามซึ่งไร้คนตอบ" (Rearrange) and "อยู่ตรงนี้ นานกว่านี้" (Yoo Trong Nee Naan Kwa Nee), and later, for reaching 200 million views for "ไกลแค่ไหน คือ ใกล้" (Glai Kae Nai Kue Glai).

In 2014, the band was among the three Thai bands, along with The Yers and P.O.P, to perform in the Summer Sonic Festival in Japan.

Despite producing songs for several years already, it was only in 2016 when the band released their debut album The First Album.

An early producer of the band was Scott Moffatt. Scott was Producer of the Year at the 2007 Seed Awards for his work with Slot Machine. Producer of The Year in 2008 at the Thai Headbanger Awards for his work with Brand New Sunset and Producer of the Year in 2020 at the CMA, CCMA, ACM Awards as producer of Country Superstar Luke Combs.

== Members ==
- Prakarn Raiva (Name) – lead vocals
- Natee Osathanugrah – guitar
- Panoth Khunprasert (Noth) – guitar, synthesizers
- Komkadech Sangwattanaroj (Prite) – drums

== Discography ==
=== Studio albums ===
Album	Details	Tracks
The First Album	Year: 2016; Label: Duckbar, White Music	1. กาลครั้งหนึ่ง ตลอดกาล; 2. สิ่งที่ตามหา; 3. ไกลแค่ไหน คือ ใกล้; 4. คนไม่จำเป็น; 5. แตกต่างเหมือนกัน; 6. เหตุผลที่ไม่มีเหตุผล; 7. อยู่ตรงนี้ นานกว่านี้; 8. คำถามซึ่งไร้คนตอบ; 9. โดดเดี่ยวด้วยกัน feat. Praewa of Yellow Fang; 10. ความมืดสีขาว (Arrow Thai release OST); Limited Edition - CD 2: 1. Stay (Stay OST; Original by Palmy); 2. ไกลแค่ไหน คือใกล้ (Special Version); 3. แตกต่างเหมือนกัน (Zeed Version) feat. Jannine Weigel, Patravee Srisuntisuk & See Scape; 4. ดอกไม้ปลอม (Fake Flower); Limited Edition - CD 3: 1. รอยจูบ; 2. กุหลาบ; 3. รูปภาพ; 4. Black Magic; 5. เศษส่วน (Fraction); 6. Season; 7. กล่อม; 8. คำตอบ; 9. เธอและฉัน; 10. ว่างเปล่า
ทำมะดา	Year: 2019; Label: White Music	1. ทำมะดา; 2. รู้ตัวว่าไม่ดี feat. Youngohm; 3. ความเงียบที่ดังที่สุด; 4. พระเอกจำลอง (Theory of Love OST); 5. ชีวิตที่มีชีวิต; 6. ความรู้สึกที่ไม่เคยรู้สึก; 7. พัง...ลำพัง; 8. ดวงจันทร์กลางวัน feat. Violette Wautier; 9. ปลาบนฟ้า; 10. นักเดินทาง; 11. วันหมดอายุ; 12. พัง..(ลำพัง) feat. Lydia; 13. Fake Protagonist; 14. คือเธอใช่ไหม feat. Tai Orathai

=== EP ===
Album	Details	Tracks
Electric Ballroom	Year: 2009; Label: Sanamluang Music	1. กล่อม; 2. รอยจูบ; 3. รูปภาพ; 4. เศษส่วน (Fraction)
2.5	Year: 2020; Label: White Music	1. ลืมว่าต้องลืม (Forgot To Forget); 2. คนเดิมที่ไม่เหมือนเดิม (Who Are You); 3. หน้ากาก (MASK); 4. จุดแวะพัก (.5); 5. คำถามซึ่งไร้คนตอบ (Rearrange)

=== Singles ===
Year	Title	English Title	Album
2007	"กล่อม"; Page B: คนคนเดียว / Too Late	—N/a	Electric Ballroom
2009	"รอยจูบ"	—N/a	Electric Ballroom
2009	"เศษส่วน"	Fraction	Electric Ballroom
2010	"ดอกไม้ปลอม"	Fake Flower	The First Album
2012	"ไกลแค่ไหน คือ ใกล้"	—N/a	The First Album
2013	"คำถามซึ่งไร้คนตอบ"	Rearrange	The First Album
2014	"สิ่งที่ตามหา"	—N/a	The First Album
2014	"อยู่ตรงนี้ นานกว่านี้"	—N/a	The First Album
2016	"คนไม่จำเป็น"	—N/a	The First Album
2017	"เหตุผลที่ไม่มีเหตุผล"	—N/a	The First Album
2017	"นักเดินทาง"	—N/a	ทำมะดา
2017	"พัง..(ลำพัง)"	—N/a	ทำมะดา
2018	"ชีวิตเดี่ยว" feat. Thongchai McIntyre	—N/a	Mini Marathon
2018	"รู้ดีว่าไม่ดี" feat. Youngohm	—N/a	ทำมะดา
2018	"ชีวิตที่มีชีวิต"	—N/a	ทำมะดา
2018	"ความเงียบดังที่สุด"	—N/a	ทำมะดา
2018	"ความรู้สึกที่ไม่เคยรู้สึก"	—N/a	ทำมะดา
2019	"ปลาบนฟ้า"	—N/a	ทำมะดา
2019	"Fake Protagonist"	—N/a	ทำมะดา
2019	"ทำ มะ ดา"	—N/a	ทำมะดา

=== Other songs ===
Year	Title	English Title	Album
2010	"คำถาม"	Question	No Album
2016	"ยิ้มสู้" (Live Version)	—N/a	No Album
2016	"ความลับในใจ" (Acoustic Version)	—N/a	นั่งเล่น
2016	"กุมภาพันธ์" (Acoustic Version)	—N/a	นั่งเล่น
2018	"ดวงจันทร์กลางวัน"	Aftermoon	NEXTPLORER
2018	"ดวงจันทร์กลางวัน"	Aftermoon	ทำมะดา
2019	"วันหมดอายุ"	—N/a	The Love Speech ขอโทษ ขอบคุณ ไม่เป็นไร
2019	"วันหมดอายุ"	—N/a	ทำมะดา
2019	"คือเธอใช่ไหม" feat. Tai Orathai	—N/a	JOOX Original Album "100x100"
2019	"คือเธอใช่ไหม" feat. Tai Orathai	—N/a	ทำมะดา
2020	"อย่างน้อยก็มากพอ" feat. Noi Pru	—N/a	JOOX Original Album "My Hero"
2020	"ถอนหายใจในใจ" feat. Perawat Sangpotirat	—N/a	AIS Play Original Album "Love Stranger"
