= Krit Sripoomseth =

Thai and actor (born 1979)

- กฤษณ์ ศรีภูมิเศรษฐ์
- Born: 20 August 1979 (age 46); Prachuap Khiri Khan, Thailand
- Other name: Krit
- Occupation: Actor
- Years active: 1995–2022
- Organization: Workpoint Entertainment

Krit Sripoomseth (Thai: กฤษณ์ ศรีภูมิเศรษฐ์, RTGS: Krit Siphumset; born August 20, 1979) is a Thai actor. He graduated from Assumption University. Starting off a career as a DJ at age 23, he later became best known for his moderator role in Fan Pan Tae for 4 years from 2012 to 2015 and Khon Uad Phee, the television programmes of Workpoint Entertainment.

== Controversy ==
In July 2026, Krit became the subject of controversy for his advice on "proper gelato consumption," stating that Thai people's mindset was incorrect and that they shouldn't be confined to a "kala" (a Thai slang term for a narrow-minded, closed-minded person). He claimed to have spent five years in Italy learning the correct way to make gelato. He also engaged in heated debates with netizens about proper gelato consumption, including the anti-nationalist term "Kalaland" (a derogatory term for Thailand), and asserted that he was more 'advanced' than Italy. Pavin Chachavalpongpun, an academic and political refugee, even mentioned wanting to try Krit's gelato. However, it was later revealed that Krit was not the actual owner of the shop and had no affiliation in it.

== Works ==
=== Dramatic programming appearances ===
- Khu Khon La Khua (2001)
- Saw Chai Hua Chai Chicago
- Luk Phu Chai
- Rak Ham Promote
- Phi Nai Kam
- Krong Phet

=== Film appearances ===
- Buppah Rahtree (2003)
- Buppah Rahtree Phase 2: Rahtree Returns (2005)
- Chai Lai (2006)
- My Valentine (2010)

=== Radio ===
- DJ RVS (2002)
- DJ Bangkok Radio (2003)
- DJ 2004 (2004)

=== Television programming appearances ===
- Five Live
- Gane Glai Tua
- Teen Center
- It's mystery
- Khon Uad Phee (2010–2022)
- Thailand's Got Talent (2011–2012)
- Fan Pan Tae (2012–2015)
- Luang Lab Tab Taek Show (2012)
- Thursday Surprise (2012–2013)
- The Noise Thailand (2013–2014)
- The Band Thailand (2013)
- The X Factor Thailand (2017)

=== Music video appearances ===
- Khon Bab Chan (1995)
- Rak... Mai Rak (1998)
- Thoe Kong Mai Ru (1998)
- Beautiful Boy (2004)
