= Yellow Fang =

Yellow Fang is a Thai indie, alternative rock band based out of Bangkok, Thailand. The band consists of Pimporn "Pang" Metchanun (Guitar, Vocals), Piyamas "Pym" Muenprasartdee (Bass, Vocals) and Praewa Chirapravati Na Ayudhya (Drums and Vocals). The band was formed in 2007. They released their eponymous first album "Yellow Fang" in 2014. They followed it up with the singles "If Only" and "Morning" in 2017. They have played at music festivals in Tokyo, Pattaya and Malaysia.
