= Palitchoke Ayanaputra =

Thai singer (born 1984)

Palitchoke Ayanaputra ผลิตโชค อายนบุตร
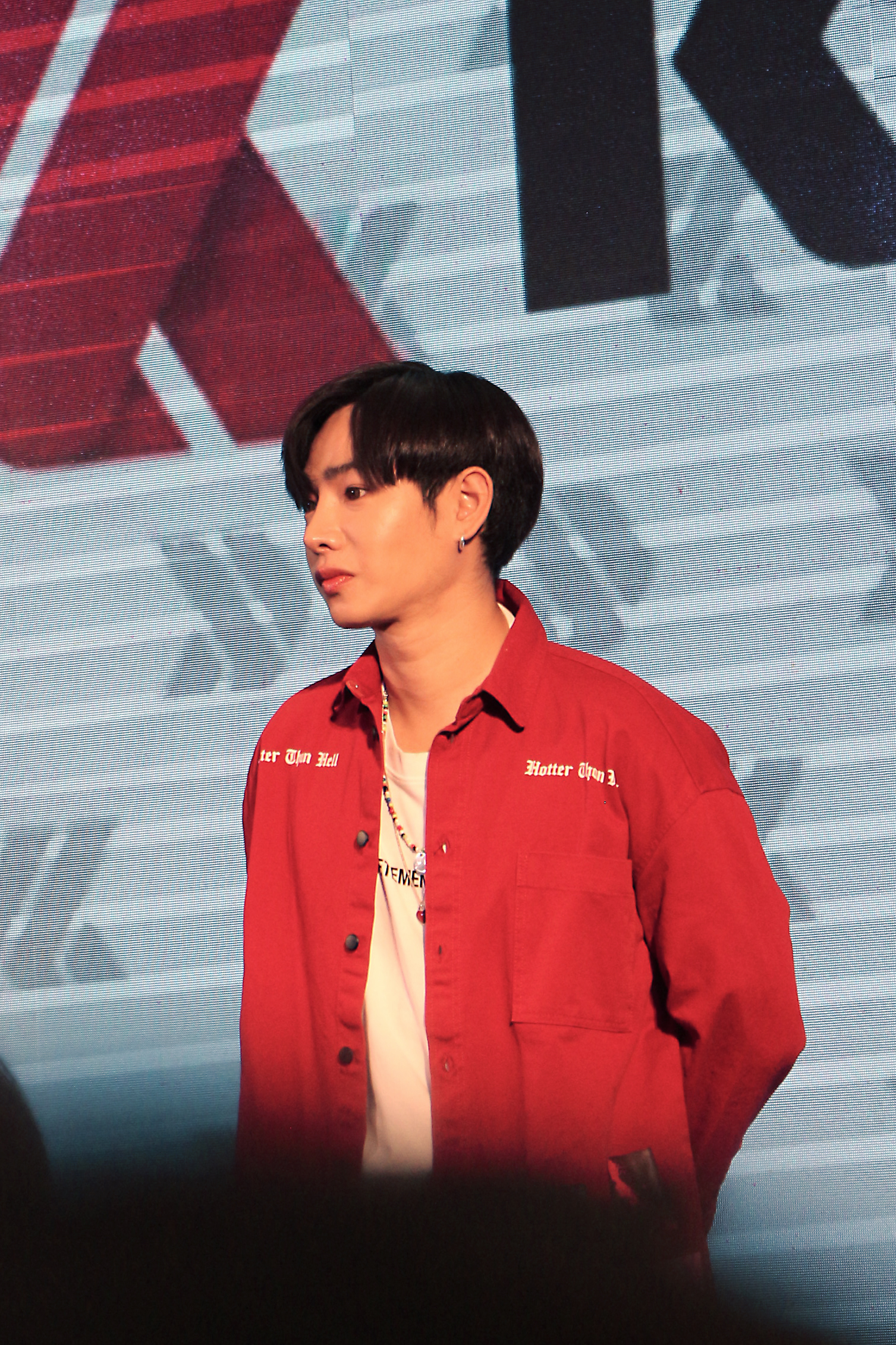
- Palitchoke in 2020

Background information
- Also known as: Peck Palit; Peck Palitchoke
- Born: August 9, 1984 (age 42); Bangkok, Thailand
- Genres: Thai Pop; R&B
- Occupations: Singer; presenter; model; music composer; writer
- Years active: 2001–present
- Labels: (2017–present) White Music of GMM Music; (2015–2016) Workgang; (2012–2014) Humbrella; (2010–2011) Exact Music; (2008–2009) Up^G; (2006–2007) Maker Head
- Website: Palitchoke's Facebook Page
- Height: 1.75 m (5 ft 9 in)

Palitchoke Ayanaputra (Thai: ผลิตโชค อายนบุตร; RTGS: Phalitchok Ayanabut; born August 9, 1984) is a Thai singer.

== Biography ==
Palitchoke Ayanaputra or Peck was born on August 9, 1984, in Bangkok, Thailand. He lived in Australia for 7 years during his childhood. After Palitchoke moved back to Thailand, he started his career in the music and entertainment industry as an artist trainee under GMM Grammy. During the training, he was a television host for Disney Club, the children's show that aired every weekend morning between 2002 and 2007. It took him between six and seven years for his first solo single, "Mai Me Krai Ru(ไม่มีใครรู้)", to release in 2005 as part of One Man Story music album. Then, in the same year, he released his first album One Palitchoke.

== Education ==
He attended Cabramatta Public School in Australia for kindergarten and elementary school for 7 years before moving back to Bangkok, Thailand. During high school, he studied at Ekamai International School, Triam Udom Suksa Nomklao School, and Navamintarajinutit Triam Udom Nomklao School (in English-French Program). He graduated from Srinakharinwirot University with a Bachelor of Fine and Applied Arts Program in Music major. Currently, he studies Master of Arts (Tourism and Hospitality Business Management) at Rangsit University.

== Music and entertainment career ==
In year 2001, Palitchoke started voice acting with the role of Percy Weasley in the first Harry Potter film. After that, in 2002, he appeared as a member of G-BOYZ, boy band under GMM Grammy label and covered 2 songs from Teen Talk album: "Yim Yim (ยิ้ม ยิ้ม)" (Original singer: Sriphan Chunechomboon) and "Mai Ru Ja Luak Krai (ไม่รู้จะเลือกใคร)" (Original singer: Shahkrit Yamnam). In 2005, Palitchoke released his first solo single "Mai Mee Krai Ru(ไม่มีใครรู้)" (Nobody Knows) from the album "One Man Story #1". Also in the same year, he released his first album "One Palitchoke" with songs such as "Rue Kae Kum Kum(หรือแค่ขำ ๆ)", "Jai Nueng Kor Rak Eek Jai Kor Jeb(ใจหนึ่งก็รักอีกใจก็เจ็บ)" and "Ni Tan Hing Hoi(นิทานหิ่งห้อย)". He followed with "One Man Story No. 2, Album: Love Passion" in 2007, including the song "Choo Nai Jai(ชู้ในใจ)". In the same year, he released his second solo album "I'm in Love".

In 2008, he formed the trio band "Peck-Aof-Ice" with Aof Pongsak and Ice Saranyu. Their first album was Together: Peck-Aof-Ice including the song "Kae Kon Tor Pid" (แค่คนโทรผิด) Along with "Mai Rak Ya Tam Hai Kid(ไม่รักอย่าทำให้คิด)" as his solo song in this album. In February 2010, Palitchoke announced his new label "เอ็กแซ็กท์ (Exact Music)" to the media. Two years later, in 2012, he signed again with the Humbrella label under GMM Grammy and released his third album "Let's Move" in the same year which included songs such as "Took Kon Laew(ถูกคนแล้ว), "Laew Tae Hua Jai Ter(แล้วแต่หัวใจเธอ)", "San Ya Mai Pen San Ya(สัญญาไม่เป็นสัญญา)", "Mai Rak Ya Fuen(ไม่รัก.. อย่าฝืน)". In 2016, Palitchoke released the single "Yak Hai Waw Ta Chan Pen Kon Ern" (Why) (อยากให้แววตาฉันเป็นคนอื่น (Why)).

Alongside his singing career, in 2014, Palitchoke joined the Thai television series "The Trainer: the fifth season" as a coach/trainer on the children's singing reality competition on Channel 3. He was a host on Disney Club, the children's television show TV show on Ch7 which broadcast every weekend morning during 2002 – 2007. He was also a host on "Wake Club" the teenagers television program every weekend morning on Ch5 in 2002. He was also a voice actor for films including roles such as Percy Weasley in the Harry Potter films since 2001, as Peter Pan in Peter Pan 2: Return to Never Land, a 2002 animated film produced by Walt Disney Television Animation, as well as "Mumble", the main protagonist in Happy Feet in 2006.

In 2017, Palitchoke joined "The Mask Singer Thailand (season 1)" as one of the contestants under the kangaroo mask. He performed songs such as Versace on the Floor, Empire State of Mind, Love On Top, How Am I Supposed to Live Without You and One Last Cry and become the winner of Group D during on-air period between January – March 2017. Later, he released the single "Tod Tee Aow tae Jai" (Sorry) (โทษที่เอาแต่ใจ) on July 10, 2017. For this song he received the awards: Favorite Asian Music Videos Of 2017 from MTV Fan Picks 20 by MTV ASIA, Best Solo Star from SBS Pop Asia Awards held by SBS(Special Broadcasting Service) Television of Australia in December 2017, and Song Of The Year from YES AWARDS held by YES R&B karaoke as of December 25, 2017.

In 2017, he received awards such as Comeback Kid Award from GQ Men of the Year 2017 on August 23, 2017, the Standard Most Popular Person of the year 2017 and Thailand Headlines Person of the Year Award 2016–2017 on July 3, 2017. He was also selected by the Thai Embassy to perform in the Thai Festival in Japan in May 2017 with fellow artists. Palitchoke performed in various 2017 concerts with All-4-One, iKON and BNK48. On December 16, 2017, he released the R&B single "This Is Love" (นี่แหละความรัก).

== Discography ==
=== Sololist albums ===
Album	Track listing
One Palitchoke * Format: Cassette, Compact disc, Digital download * Released: January 19, 2005 * Label: Maker Head; GMM Grammy	1. *Rak kue Rak(รักคือรัก); 2. *Rue Kae Kum Kum(หรือแค่ขำขำ); 3. Son(ซน); 4. *Jai Nung Kor Rug Eek Jai Kor Jeb(ใจหนึ่งก็รัก อีกใจก็เจ็บ); 5. *Ni Tan Hing hoi(นิทานหิ่งห้อย); 6. Catch Me; 7. Just Say Good Night; 8. Sai Jai(ใส่ใจ); 9. Kon Ok Hag(คนอกหัก); 10. BANANA; 11. *Mai Me Krai Ru(ไม่มีใครรู้)
I'm in Love * Format: Compact disc, Digital download * Released: May 14, 2007 * Label: Up^G; GMM Grammy	1. All I Want Is You; 2. In Love; 3. Mod Jai(หมดใจ); 4. Yak Jer Ter Kuen Nee(อยากเจอเธอคืนนี้ (feat. Nara)); 5. *Card Bai Nung(การ์ดใบหนึ่ง); 6. Ter Kon Nee(เธอคนเดียว); 7. To Ha Kan Noi(โทรหากันหน่อย); 8. *Jub La Tan Kam Wa Sia Jai(จูบลาแทนคำว่าเสียใจ); 9. *Sang Son(สั่งสอน); 10. *Ja Kid Tung Krai(จะคิดถึงใคร(Lonely))
Let's Move * Format: Compact disc, Digital download * Released: October 5, 2012 * Label: Humbrella; GMM Grammy	1. Sud Wi Sai(สุดวิสัย); 2. *San Ya Mai Pen San Ya(สัญญาไม่เป็นสัญญา); 3. *Took Kon Laew(ถูกคนแล้ว); 4. Don't Say Good Night; 5. *Mai Rak Ya Fuen(ไม่รัก.. อย่าฝืน); 6. You've Got Me; 7. *Laew Tae Hua Jai Ter(แล้วแต่หัวใจเธอ); 8. Let's Move; 9. *Kwam Lub(ความลับ); 10. Pae Tua Aeng(แพ้ตัวเอง)
THE BUTTERFLY * Format: Digital download, Box Set, Cassette, Vinyl * Released: October, 2019 * Label: White Music; GMM Grammy	1. LONELY NIGHT; 2. NOBODY LIKE YOU (THAI); 3. นี่แหละความรัก THIS IS LOVE; 4. FIRST LADY; 5. ไม่อยากให้กลับ; 6. I'M OK; 7. โทษที่เอาแต่ใจ; 8. FIRST LADY (Remix); 9. Nobody Like You; 10. นี่แหละความรัก 702voice
A Little Thing * Format: Digital download * Released: May 29, 2020 * Label: White Music; GMM Grammy	1. A little thing 2. ไม่ควรมีคนเดียว; 3. CALL; 4. It's my turn 5. Get to know you

- *= notable songs

=== Single ===
Year	Labels	Songs
2009	Up^G; GMM Grammy	1. We La Gub Jai Kon(เวลากับใจคน); 2. Alcohol (ช่วยได้มาก)
2016	Werkgang; GMM Grammy	1. (*)Yak Hai waw Ta Chan Pen Kon Ern(อยากให้แววตาฉันเป็นคนอื่น(Why))
2017	White Music; GMM Grammy	1. (*)Tod Tee Aow Tae Jai(โทษที่เอาแต่ใจ(Sorry)); 2. (*)This is Love(นี่แหละความรัก); 3. (*)First Lady; 4. (*)I'm OK; 5. (*)Nobody Like You (collaboration with Hollaphonic); 6. (*)Mai Yark Hai Club (ไม่อยากให้กลับ); 7. (*)Lonely Night

- (*)= notable songs

=== Other albums ===
Album	Year	Labels	Songs
One Man Story	2005	Maker Head; GMM Grammy	1. *Mai Me Krai Ru(ไม่มีใครรู้); 2. Tid Jai(ติดใจ)
Ost. Prung Nee Mai Sai Tee Ja Rak Gun (พรุ่งนี้ไม่สาย...ที่จะรักกัน)	2005	Maker Head; GMM Grammy	1. Tum Mai(ทำไม)
One Man Story #2 Love Passion	2007	Up^G; GMM Grammy	1. Choo nai Jai(ชู้ในใจ); 2. Sam Pan Chua Kraw(สัมพันธ์...ชั่วคราว)
Together: Peck-Aof-Ice	2008	GMM Grammy	1. Kae Kon Toe Pid(แค่คนโทรผิด); 2. Ter Kue Sing Sood Tai(เธอคือสิ่งสุดท้าย); 3. Na Rak Na Love(น่ารัก น่า Love); 4. Mai Rak Ya Tam Hai Kid(ไม่รักอย่าทำให้คิด); 5. Ruang Mai Dee Mai Jam(เรื่องไม่ดีไม่จำ); 6. Pa Ti Sed Kao Pai(ปฏิเสธเขาไป); 7. Nuay Gern Pai Rue Plao(เหนื่อยเกินไปหรือเปล่า); 8. Praw Kam Wa Rak(เพราะคำว่ารัก); 9. Rak Gun Na Dee Gun Na(รักกันนะ ดีนะ); 10. Jai Gwang(ใจกว้างงงง); 11. Ya Tam Hai Fa Pid Wang(อย่าทำให้ฟ้าผิดหวัง) (VCD Karaoke Bonus Track)
Sleepless Society #3 One Night Stand	2008	GMM Grammy	1. Jeb Young Ngai Gor Rak(เจ็บยังไงก็รัก); 2. Mai Yak Non Kuen Nee(ไม่อยากนอนคืนนี้)
Voice of Love	2010	Exact Music; GMM Grammy	1. Me Hua Jai Tae Mai Yak Rak(มีหัวใจแต่ไม่อยากรัก)
Act Track Vol.3	2010	Exact Music; GMM Grammy	1. Kon Mai Me Fan(คนไม่มีแฟน) (Ost. Salad Soad Company(สลัดโสด คอมปานี))
Vietrio & Friends by Vietrio	2010	Exact Music; GMM Grammy	1. Yod Nam Ta(หยดน้ำตา)
The Song in Honor of the Queen Of Thailand's 80th Birthday(บทเพลงเฉลิมพระเกียรติพระราชินี 80 พรรษา)	2012	Exact Music; GMM Grammy	1. Mae Kong Kon Thai (Mother of Thai people)(แม่ของคนไทย)
COVER NIGHT PLUS: Always Smile	2013	GMM Grammy	1. Garn Plian Plang(การเปลี่ยนแปลง)
Forntage Freeform	2014	Forntage; GMM Grammy	1. Waew Ta Feat. Tul Apartment Kun Pa(แววตา Feat.ตุลย์ อพาร์ตเมนต์คุณป้า)
The Song in Honor of the King Rama 9th Of Thailand(บทเพลงเฉลิมพระเกียรติ)	2014	GMM Grammy	1. Kong Kwan Jag Gone Din Feat. Kanist Piyapaphakornkoon and Kornpassorn Duaysianklao (ของขวัญจากก้อนดิน Feat.คณิศ ปิยะปภากรกูล, กรณ์ภัสสร ด้วยเศียรเกล้า)

- *= notable songs

=== OST ===
Year	Song	Drama
2006(2549)	It's Still...Love, Jeb Young Ngai Kor Rak (เจ็บยังไงก็รัก)	Ost. Korean Series, A Love to Kill, Kaen Per Rak (แค้นเพื่อรัก)
2009(2552)	Song Sai Chan Rak Ter(สงสัยฉันรักเธอ)	Ost. Rak You Mad(รักอยู่หมัด)
2010(2553)	Kon Mai Me Fan(คนไม่มีแฟน)	Ost. Salad Sod Company(สลัดโสด คอมปานี)
2014(2557)	Rak Krang Rak Lae Krung Sood Tai(รักครั้งแรกและครั้งสุดท้าย)	Ost. Qubic(คิวบิก)
2014(2557)	Ter Kue Kwam Rak Rue Plao(เธอคือความรักหรือเปล่า)	Ost. Ku Larb Sorn Glin(กุหลาบซ่อนกลิ่น)
2016(2560)	Rak Lob Grod Long(รัก โลภ โกรธ หลง)	The Extra (วงการร้าย วงการรัก)

== Filmography ==
=== Voice Actor ===
Year	Character	Movie/Serie
2001	Percy Weasley	Harry Potter
2002	Peter Pan	Peter Pan 2
2002–2007	Wade	Kim Possible (T.V. Series)
2006	Mumble	Happy Feet
2013	Hyun	Bird : Flying With Byrd (เบิร์ดแลนด์...แดนมหัศจรรย์)

=== TV Host ===
Year	Program
2002–2007	Disney Club
2002	Wake Club
2014	365 Post news
2014	Suay Chiab Niab (สวยเฉียบเนี้ยบ)

=== Series ===
- as JP in The Extra วงการร้าย วงการรัก(2016)

== Concerts ==
Date	Concert	Location	With	Note
March 20–22, 2009	Pattaya Music Festival 2009	Pattaya, Chonburi	Various Artists	Held by Tourism Authority of Thailand
December 9, 2009	CAT009 Music Call POP UP CONCERT	CenterPoint Playhouse, Central World		Held by CAT Telecom Public Co., Ltd.
February 16, 2010	Gone Din Nueng Diew	Thailand Cultural Centre, Huai Khwang	Rose / Pop-Win Calorie Blah Blah	Charity Concert for Pra Da Bos Foundation
February 20–21, 2010	This Is It: Thailand Tribute Concert for Michael Jackson	IMPACT Muang Thong Thani	Various Artists	
March 19–21, 2010	Pattaya International Music Festival 2010	Pattaya, Chonburi	Various Artists	Held by Tourism Authority of Thailand
April 3, 2010	Covernight Plus: Boys And Big Band	Bangkok Theatre, Big C Rajdamri	Pop / Win / Aof / Nam Ronnadej	Held by Green Wave FM106.5
November 28, 2010	Covernight Plus: Instrument Of Love	Route 66	Gun Napat / Pete Pol / V Trio	Held by Green Wave FM106.5
March 18–20, 2011	Pattaya International Music Festival 2011	Pattaya, Chonburi	Various Artist	Held by Tourism Authority of Thailand
June 11, 2011	Sleepless Society	Ocean Marina Yacht Club	Praew / Oat Pramote / Un Puwanat / Pijika	
November 12, 2011	Busking For Flood Victims	Park Paragon	Rose / Ice Saranyu	
March 6, 2012	Satit Kaset Charity 11th	Jongrak Grainam Auditorium, Faculty of Edu. Building, K.U.		Held by Parent-Teacher Asst. of K.U. Lab. School
November 16, 2013	Battle Cuisine	Voice Space, Vipavadee Road	NewJew / Bell Suphon	Held by 103 LIKE FM
July 25, 2014	Love Song, Fun song, Bring Happy Back To Thai	Indoor Stadium, Hua Mak	Various Artists	Held by Public Relations Department of Thailand, Representative Office of Thailand and Royal Thai Armed Forces
April 2, 2017	The Mask Singer Mini Concert	KBank Siam Pic-Ganesha Theatre, Siam Square One	Various Artists	Held by OPPO, sold out tickets, concert held 3 rounds
April 18, 2017	Summer Picnic Boutique Concert	Foto Hotel, Phuket	Various Artists	Charity Concert for Phuket Panyanukul School
April 20, 2017	The Power Of Sharing	Main Auditorium, Bansomdejchaopraya Rajabhat University	Bodyslam	For Support Student Project: Bansomdej Entertainment
May 13–14, 2017	Thai Festival 2017	Yoyogi Park, Tokyo, Japan	Various Artists	Live in Japan, music in the park
June 10, 2017	Battle Field Dance Party	Show DC Rama9	Chin / Bee The Star / Hun The Star / THREE ONE SIX (Thai-K POP) / Rose Quartz (Thai-K POP)	
July 5, 2017	Concert For Animal Rescue	GMM Livehouse at CentralWorld 8th Floor	Various Artists	Charity concert for the ARK foundation, Chiang Mai
July 16, 2017	URBAN MUSIC FESTIVAL	Siam Discovery	Pop Pongkul / Oat Pramote / Various Artists	Held by Chang
August 19, 2017	All-4-One Live in Bangkok	Thunder Dome, Muang Thong Thani	All-4-One	Guest Artist with Ngong Dae Band
August 30, 2017	2017 411 FANDOM PARTY IN BANGKOK	Royal Paragon Hall	iKON (K POP) / BNK48 (K POP)	Sold Out Tickets
September 15–16, 2017	Whitehaus Concert#2: "4 chairs"	GMM Livehouse at CentralWorld 8th Floor	Pop Pongkul / Oat Pramote / Atom Chanagun	Held by White Music, Sold Out Tickets
September 17, 2017	THE ONE CONCERT : THE FANTASTIC 3 RETURNS	BCC HALL, Central Plaza Ladprao	Stamp / Ben Chalatid	Held by FM ONE 103.5, Sold Out Tickets
October 4–5, 2017	Peck&Oat Knock Out Concert	Sala Daeng Garden, Pasadena, California, USA	Oat Pramote	Live in California, USA
November 18, 2017	Chang – Major Movie on the Hill: Funtasy Jungle	The Bloom By TV Pool Kao Yai	Room39 / NewJew / Jetset'er / Tattoo colour	Held by Chang and Major Movie
November 24, 2017	Peck Palitchoke Live in Melbourne	Melbourne, Australia	-	Australia Concert Tours(1/3)
November 26, 2017	Peck Palitchoke Live in Sydney	Space, 127 Liverpool St., Sydney, Australia	-	Australia Concert Tours(2/3)
November 27, 2017	Peck Palitchoke Live in Brisbane	Brisbane, Australia	-	Australia Concert Tours(3/3)
December 9–10, 2017	Big Mountain Music Festival 2017	The Ocean Khao Yai, Thanarat Rd.	More than 200 artists on 8 stages	Held by GMM and Yutthana Boonaom
December 31, 2017	Bangkok Countdown 2018	CentralWorld Square	Da Endorphine / Room39 / Stamp / Hun Issariya / The Parkinson / James Jirayu / Various Artists	Held by AIS, the stage length 80 meters
January 20, 2018	Nung Len Music Festival 3	The Ocean Khao Yai, Thanarat Rd.	Various Artists	Held by Chang Music Connection
January 27, 2018	EFM EFM CHILL ON THE HILL NO.8	The Ocean Khao Yai, Thanarat Rd.	Oat Pramote / Pop Pongkul / Ae Jirakorn / Singto Numchoke / MILD	Held by EFM
April 20–22, 2018	OISHI Green Tea Presents : PECK PALITCHOKE "First Date" Concert	Royal Paragon Hall	Pop Pongkul / New&Jew / Mariya / Oat Pramote	Held by White Music (Tickets sold out within five minutes)
April 6–8, 2019	OISHI Gold Presents PECK PALITCHOKE Concert # 2 : LOVE IN SPACE Concert	Royal Paragon Hall	Season5 / Bell Supol / Rose Sirintip / Panadda Ruangwut / Bella Ranee/ Tata Young	Held by White Music
November 7–8, 2020	Peck Palitchoke 15th Anniversary The Final Odyssey Concert Concert	IMPACT Arena	Da Endorphine / Pup Potato / Yaya Urassaya / Aof Pongsak / Ice Sarunyu	Held by White Music

== Awards and achievement ==
Year	Award	TiTle	Result	Note
2011	Golden Television Award (รางวัลโทรทัศน์ทองคำ)	Best Character Voice Team	Won	As: Hun From: Bird : Flying With Byrd(February 11, 2012 (2555))
2017	Kazz Awards 2017	Most Popular Artist	Won	May 22, 2017
2017	Nine Entertain Awards 2017	Most Popular Star Award	Won	June 8, 2017
2017	Thailand Headlines Person of the Year Award 2016–2017	Culture And Entertainment	Won	July 3, 2017, Thai Famous&Outstanding Public Figure Who Appeared in Chinese Media
2017	GQ Men of the Year 2017	Comeback Kid	Won	August 23, 2017
2017	Inside Star Award	The Mask Singer of the Year	Won	September 16, 2017, as appeared as Kangaroo Mask
2017	MTV EMA LONDON 2017 (Pre Nominated)	SEA Social Wildcard Winner 2017	Won	October 4, 2017
2017	MTV EMA LONDON 2017 (MTV EUROPE MUSIC AWARDS LONDON 2017)	Best Southeast Asia Act	Nominated	November 12, 2017
2017	MTV Fan Picks 20 (MTV ASIA)	Favorite Asian Music Videos Of 2017, Song: Tod tee Aow Tae Jai(Sorry) (โทษที่เอาแต่ใจ(Sorry))	Won	December 31, 2017
2017	THE STANDARD PERSON OF THE YEAR 2017	THE MOST POPULAR PERSON OF THE YEAR 2017	Won	December 2017, held by Standard Online Magazine
2017	SBS Pop Asia Awards 2017	Best Solo Star	Won	December 2017, held by SBS(Special Broadcasting Service) Television of Australia
2017	YES AWARDS	Song of the Year "Tod Tee Aow Tae Jai(โทษที่เอาแต่ใจ)" and Singer of the year (Total of 2 awards)	Won	December 25, 2017, YES AWARDS held by YES R&B karaoke
2018	GREAT STARS SOCIAL SUPER STAR OF THE YEAR 2017	SOCIAL SUPER STAR OF THE YEAR 2017 | Male	Nominated	January 15, 2018
2018	The Star's Light Awards	Most Popular Male Artist	Won	February 14, 2018
2018	Line TV Awards 2018	Best Song, Song: Tod tee Aow Tae Jai(Sorry) (โทษที่เอาแต่ใจ(Sorry))	Won	February 20, 2018
2018	Thailand Zocial Awards 2018	Best Male Artist	Won	February 28, 2018
2018	The Guitar Mag Award 2018	Popular Vote	Won	March 12, 2018, held by The Guitar Magazine
2018	The Guitar Mag Award 2018	Best Male of the Year	Nominated	March 12, 2018, held by The Guitar Magazine
2018	Sanook! VOTE OF THE YEAR 2017	Best Solo Artist	Won	March 15, 2018, held by Sanook! Website
2018	MThai Top Talk-About 2018	Top Talk-About Artist	Won	March 15, 2018, held by MThai Website
2018	Kazz Awards 2018	Favourite singer of 2018; Cool Guy; Popular vote	Won	May 16, 2018, held by Kazz Magazine
2018	Daradaily Awards 2017 ครั้งที่ 7	Best Male singer of 2017	Won	May 18, 2018, held by daradaily.com Website
