= Boriboon Chanrueng =

Thai actor and comedian (born 1979)

- บริบูรณ์ จันทร์เรือง
- Born: Boriboon Chanrueng; 19 December 1979 (age 46); Bangkok, Thailand
- Other name: Tuck
- Education: Suan Sunandha Rajabhat University
- Occupations: Actor; comedian; model; TV host
- Height: 1.70 m (5 ft 7 in)
- Spouse: Elsie Tan Ai Chia (m. 2013)
- Children: 1
- Website: Official website

Boriboon Chanrueng (Thai: บริบูรณ์ จันทร์เรือง; born December 19, 1979), better known as Tuck Boriboon (Thai: ตั๊ก บริบูรณ์), is a Thai actor, comedian, model and TV host. His high schools were Wannawit School and Triam Udom Suksa Pattanakarn School. He earned a bachelor's degree in business administration at Suan Sunandha Rajabhat University.

Started an acting career at a young age, he entered the showbiz by starring in a fantasy dance film The Magic Shoes in 1992 (debut film of Prachya Pinkaew), as the younger brother of Touch (Touch Na Takuathung), the main character.

He later became best known for his moderator role in Khon Uad Phee, the television programme of Workpoint Entertainment. Chanrueng is married to Elsie Tan Ai Chia, a former Malaysian air hostess on July 28, 2013, at Grand Hyatt Erawan Bangkok.

== Works ==
=== Dramatic programming appearances ===
- Ruen Ram
- Chom Phu Boek Fa
- Sanyan Luang
- Nang Saw Wan Chuen
- Nang Lakorn
- Big Sia
- Rong Ram Wi Prit
- Kalon X2
- Phalang Rak
- Saw Noi Roi Lan
- Suen Noi Noi Kalon Mak Noi
- Pluem
- Mai Dad
- Chom Phu Gam Mam
- Ngao Asok (2008)
- Nang Saw Yen Ruede (2008)
- Sukunka (2009)
- Phu Yai Lee and Nang Ma (2009)
- Cham Loei Gammathep (2009)
- Pee Sat San Kon (2010)
- Ghost Hotel (2010)
- Suai Rerd Cherd Sode (2010)
- 365 days of Love (2010)
- Chuen Cheewa Naree (2011)
- Rak Airdate (2012)
- Ma Yai Tee Rak (2012)
- Kum Pha Kum (2012)
- Panya Chon Kon Khrua (2012)
- Wiwah Pacha Taek (2013)

==== Sitcoms appearances ====
- Yommalok Society
- Khu Kik Phrik Ka Kluea
- Ra Boed Thoed Thoeng Lan Thung (2010-2012)
- Sud Yod
- Ra Boed Taew Tiang Trong
- Wongkamlao The Series

=== Film appearances ===
- The Magic Shoes (1992)
- Fire & Ice (1996)
- Dek Sephle (1996)
- Ghost Variety (2005)
- Three Cripples (2007)
- Variety Ghost (2007)
- Village Of Warriors (2008)
- Se-Sing Confirm (2010)
- Teng Nong Jee Won Bin (2011)
- Hazard (2011)
- Jukkalan (2011)
- Still on My Mind (2011)
- Ghost Day (2012)
- Yak: The Giant King (2012)
- Saranae Osekkai (2012)
- Tho Sansang Thai Sangsan (2012)
- Grean Fictions (2013)
- Dinotherra (2013)

=== Music video appearances ===
- Thao Fai
- Thoe Mai Phit
- Nue Khu
- Rao Pen Khon Thai
- Leh
- Dek Pee Mee Chu
- Siang
- Rong Hai Ha Pho Thoe Rue

=== Television programming appearances ===
- You and I (1996)
- Q-twenty (2006)
- Ono Show (2010-2011)
- Khon Uad Phee (2010–present)
- Whose house? (2011–present)
- Suek Song Ban (2013–present)

=== Advertisement appearances ===
- Ziclet chewing gum
- Everscent Perfume cologne
- Mitsubishi Surprise
- Roller Coaster
- CP Chicken
- Fino
- Swensen's Happy Sundae

=== Concert ===
- Kote Cafe On Stage
- Train Rally Charity Concert
- Suptar ON STAGE
- Lift & Oil Happy Party Concert

=== Book ===
- Column Boriboon Family Magazine
