= Kapol Thongplub =

Thai actor and television presenter (born 1967)

- กพล ทองพลับ
- Born: Kapol Thongplub; 4 September 1967 (age 59); Chainat, Thailand
- Other name: DJ Pong
- Education: Bangkok Christian College
- Occupations: Radio host; television programmer; ghost hunter; actor; director
- Years active: 1980s–present
- Height: 1.60 m (5 ft 3 in)

Kapol Thongplub (Thai: กพล ทองพลับ nickname; Un or Pong born 4 September 1967 at Chainat) is a Thai television programmer and actor. Known as the host of paranormal television programs Khon Uad Phee and Shock Station.

Graduated from Bangkok Christian College, where he was a classmate of Saharat Sangkapreecha (Kong of the band Nuvo). He subsequently attended the School of Accountancy at Bangkok University and the Faculty of Political Science at Ramkhamhaeng University, but did not complete his studies at either institution.

He first became known in the 1980s as a radio DJ hosting music programs. In the early 1990s, he began incorporating ghost stories into his radio programs, interspersing them with music. In 1994, the program evolved into a full-fledged ghost-story program called The Shock Radio. The segment became increasingly popular and eventually became something of a signature of his. It continued to develop over the years and eventually expanded into a television program.

== Work ==
=== Host ===
==== Radio Program ====
- Sport Relax
- The Shock

==== Television Program ====
- JOKER VARIETY
- THE SHOCK ON TV
- Khon Uad Phee
- The Scary TV
- Jarachon Game

=== Acting ===
- Friendship
- Bangkok Haunted
- Bang Rak Soi 9

=== Director ===
- The Letters of Death (2006)

=== Album ===
- The Message
- Peelok – Magenta

=== TV Dramas ===
- 2004 (ไปแล้วกลับ หลับแล้วตื่น ฟื้นเพื่อเธอ) (Kantana/ITV) as Pong Kapol (ป๋อง กพล)
- 2005 (มิตร ชัยบัญชา มายาชีวิต) (/Ch.7) as (นักเต้นที่เข้าร่วมฉากกับ มิตร ชัยบัญชา)
- 2006 (นรกตัวสุดท้าย) (/Ch.3) as Mor Khak (หมอแขก)
- 2010 (ปอบอพาร์ทเมนท์) (Por Dee Kam/Ch.7) as (Guest role)
- 2011 Jao Sao Pom Mai Chai Pee (เจ้าสาวผมไม่ใช่ผี) (Step Power 3/Ch.3) as Samlee (สำลี)
- 2013 (วิวาห์ป่าช้าแตก) (/Ch.8) as Se' Kumora (Mor Pee Khmer) (เซ กูมอร่า (หมอผีเขมร))
- 2022 Krasue Lam Sing (กระสือลำซิ่ง) (Cheer Up/Ch.8) as Pong Kapol (ป๋อง กพล) (Guest role)
- 2022 Divided Heart (2022) (Sai Leurd Song Hua Jai) (สายเลือดสองหัวใจ) (SUP Entertainment/Ch.7) as Theimsak Jareindee (Hia Tong) (เติมศักดิ์ เจริญดี (เฮียตง))
- 2023 Khru Phensri and Ghoul Lady (ครูเพ็ญศรีกับเลดี้ปอบ) (Workpoint Entertainment-B MOVIE/Workpoint TV) as (บันลือศักดิ์ (บันลือ)) with Sudarat Butrprom

=== TV Series ===
- 2017 (หล่อล่าผี) (/Thairath TV) as Pong
- 20 () (/Ch.) as

=== TV Sitcom ===
- 2009 Bang Rak Soi 9 (บางรักซอย 9 ตอนที่ 329 คลื่นวิทยุ..จุ๊ จุ๊ จุ๊) (Exact-Scenario/Ch.9) as (Guest role)
- 20 () (/Ch.) as

=== Movies ===
- 1997 (ไนน์ตี้ช็อค เตลิดเปิดโลง) (Five Star Production) as Pong Kapol (ป๋อง กพล)
- 2001 Bangkok Haunted (ผีสามบาท) (Avant) as
- 2002 Sin Sisters (ผู้หญิง 5 บาป) (Sahamongkol Film) as
- 2008 Friendship (เฟรนด์ชิพ เธอกับฉัน) () as Pong Kapol (ป๋อง กพล)
- 2010 The Snow White (ผีตายทั้งกลม) (Phranakornfilm) as
- 2011 (30+ โสด On Sale) (Sahamongkol Film) as Pong Kapol (ป๋อง กพล)
- 2012 Mid Road Gang 2 (มะหมา 2) () as
- 2015 The One Ticket (ตัวพ่อเรียกพ่อ) (Sahamongkol Film) as
- 2020 Check-in Shock (เกมเซ่นผี) (Major Group) as

== Filmography ==
Year	Title	Role
2023	Ghost Rookie	Fake shaman

== Personal life ==
He is a supporter of Arsenal F.C. and has supported the club since childhood.
