= Armchair (band) =

- Also known as: SHAKERS
- Years active: 2001–present)

Armchair (Thai: อามแชร์) is a Thai pop rock band formed in Bangkok. Originally, this band was called SHAKERS on the album Small Room 001. Later, they changed the name to Armchair. The members said that the name is a symbol of the relaxing music of the band.

== History ==
Armchair consists of four young people from King Mongkut’s Institute of Technology Ladkrabang and Alumni Suankularb Wittayalai School. Pastel Mood is their first album under Universal Music (Thailand) and by Rungrote Uppatumphowat. This album was very popular in genre bossa nova. Design is their second album. Armchair had sales landslide and have to be reproduced with a new name Re-Design. In the following year, Armchair released a new album entitled Spring. After that, Armchair has stopped creating music because one of the members went to study abroad but has created a special album by the name Tender. In 2010, they released their comeback album under Sony music Thailand. This album contains a special music to advertise and they released the first single which got the No. 1 rank in many popular radio stations.

== Discography ==
SHAKERS

- Small Room 001

Armchair

- Pastel mood(2001)
- Design(2003)
- Spring(2004)
- Tender(2005)
- Colours In The Shadow(2008)

== Songs ==
Armchair has released over 50 songs, with the album count at 5.

Album name	Release date	Songs
Pastel Mood	2001	1. ป๊าดีดาดีดั๊บ (Padidadidap); 2. อบเชย (Love's Lullaby); 3. เธอคนเดียว (You're The One); 4. อยากกลับไปหา (Wish I Were There); 5. คิดถึง (Missing You); 6. อีกครั้ง (I'm Sorry); 7. ป่วนปั่น (Tremblingly Heart); 8. หยุดรอ (Waiting); 9. ทุกค่ำคืน (Every Single Night); 10. ภาพลวงตา (Dream); 11. ดวงดาวในบ่อน้ำ (Reflection Of The Stars); 12. สิมิลัน (Similan)
Design	2003	1. รึเปล่า (Curiosity); 2. อาจเพราะเธอ ( Bliss); 3. Minute Of Love; 4. วันที่ฉันป่วย (Long For); 5. สำเริงสำราญ (I Die Leisure); 6. อยู่ที่เธอทุกอย่าง (Sweet Taste Colour); 7. ผู้ชายที่โชคดี (Must); 8. เข้าใจและยอมรับ (Monochrome); 9. ขอให้หยุดฟัง (Near-By-Distance); 10. ทำไม (Naive Song)
Spring	2004	1. ไปด้วยกันรึเปล่า?; 2. รักแท้; 3. พรุ่งนี้; 4. Photograph; 5. 15 กุมภา; 6. กลับไปกลับมา; 7. My Saturday; 8. ผู้หญิงปากแข็ง; 9. ความเงียบของเธอ; 10. ครึ่งใจ
Tender	2005	1. น้ำหนัก; 2. รักแท้; 3. อยากกลับไปหา; 4. รึเปล่า; 5. แพร; 6. ไปด้วยกันรึเปล่า; 7. วันที่ฉันป่วย; 8. อบเชย; 9. คิดถึง; 10. อาจเพราะเธอ; 11. อยู่ที่เธอทุกอย่าง; 12. เข้าใจและยอมรับ; 13. ป่วนปั่น; 14. สิ่งที่เราไม่เคยเข้าใจ; 15. Casual (บรรเลง)
Colours In The Shadow	2008	1. แค่เรา (Blow); 2. ความในใจ; 3. หนึ่งคำขอโทษ (Mind); 4. จะออกตามหา; 5. อยากขอบคุณ (Love); 6. เพลงของเธอใจของฉัน; 7. ภาพวันเก่า; 8. ก่อนจะสาย; 9. เพราะเธอและฉัน; 10. เพียงความเงียบเหงา; 11. Unknown; 12. หาย; 13. My Sweet Home
