= Pongpisuth Pue-on =

Thai football player (born 1985)

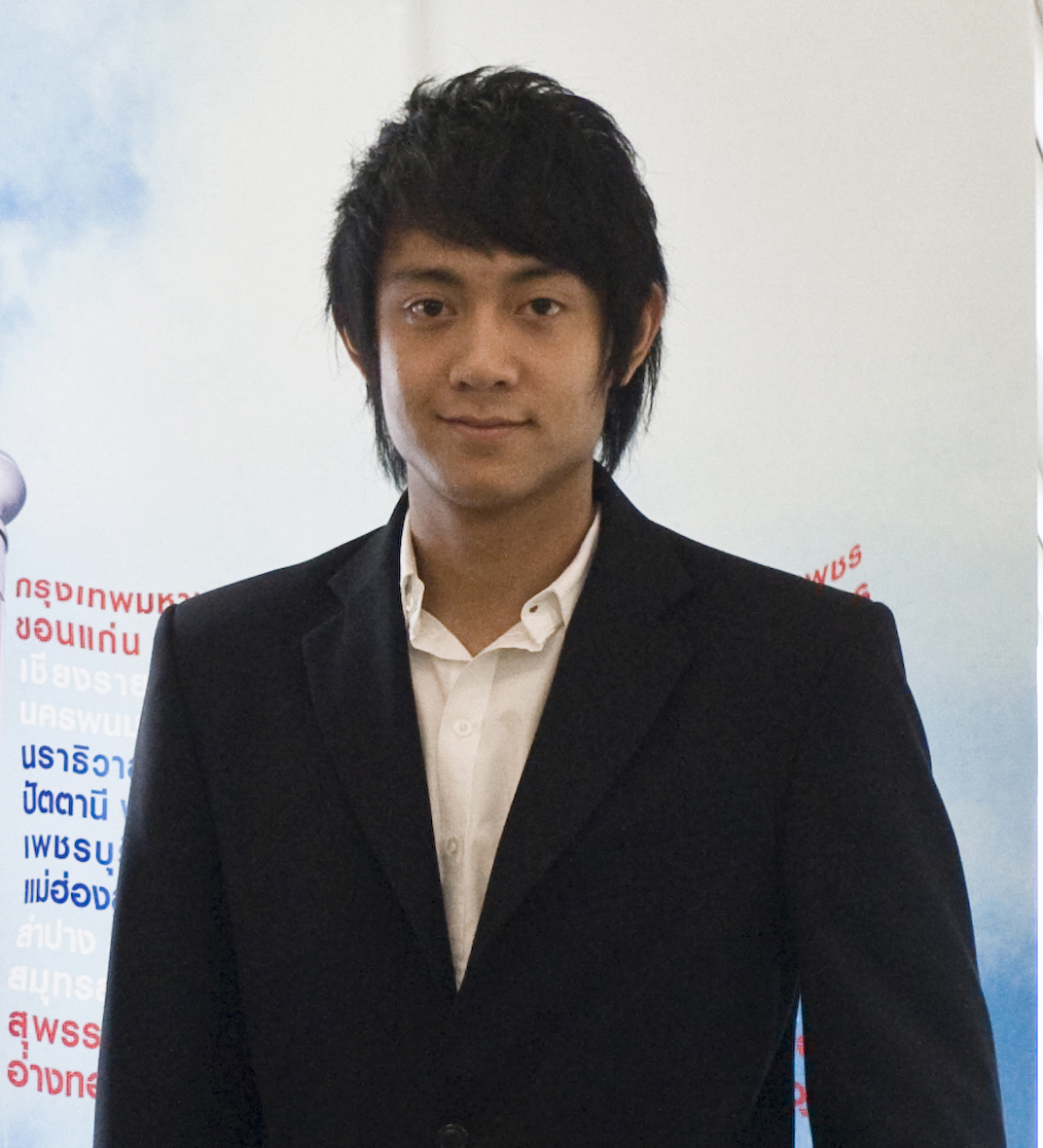

Personal information
- Full name: Pongpisuth Pue-on
- Date of birth: October 18, 1985 (age 41)
- Place of birth: Bangkok, Thailand
- Height: 1.82 m (5 ft 11 1/2 in)
- Position: Striker

Youth career
- 1998-2000: Bangkok Christian College
- 2001–2003: Middlesbrough College
- 2003: Oldham Athletic

Senior career*
Years	Team	Apps	(Gls)
2004	Royal Thai Air Force	0	(0)
2004-2005	RBAC	25	(14)
2006	Gombak United	13	(1)

International career
2004	Thailand U20	3	(0)
- * Club domestic league appearances and goals

Pongpisuth Pue-on (Thai: พงษ์พิสุทธิ์ ผิวอ่อน; RTGS: Phongphisut Phio-on; (born 18 October 1985) is a Thai retired football player who played as a striker. He is the son of Piyapong Pue-on, Thai legendary football player, and Somkid Pue-on. His nickname is Tangmo. He started playing football when he was 9 years old. He studied at Bangkok Christian College and Suankularb Wittayalai School until secondary 4 and got quota from the Football Association of Thailand and Adidas to study at Middlesbrough College in England for 3 years. he then came back to Thailand in 2004.

== Early life ==
Pongpisuth graduated from Sripatum University. He retired from professional football due to his chronic knee pain.

== External sources ==
- ก้าวต่อไปของ ‘พงษ์พิสุทธิ์ ผิวอ่อน’ สายเลือดใหม่วงการฟุตบอลไทย
- ประวัติ พงษ์พิสุทธิ์ ผิวอ่อน จากคอลัมน์ รู้ไปโม้ด
- เวทีคนเก่ง สยามรัฐ
- เด็กเด็ดเด็ด ไทยรัฐ
