= Supol Phuasirirak =

Thai singer

- สุพล พัวศิริรักษ์
- Born: 15 December 1981 (age 44); Bangkok, Thailand
- Other name: Bell
- Height: 1.79 m (5 ft 10 in)

Supol Phuasirirak (Thai: สุพล พัวศิริรักษ์; nickname Bell (Thai: เบล), born 15 December 1981) is a Thai singer and television host. He studied at Assumption College and Assumption University.

He has released several records with GMM Grammy, and is best known for the hit songs "Mai Thammada" and "Saen Lan Nathi".

== Studio albums ==
- Happy Hours (2012)
- Good Afternoon (2010)
- Very Bell (2009)
- Sleepless Society 3 By Narongvit One Night Stand (2008)
- D.I.Y by Narongvit
- Left & Right The Celebration Album (2007)
- Gift (2006)
