= Touch Na Takuatung =

Thai pop singer and actor

Touch Na Takuatung ทัช ณ ตะกั่วทุ่ง
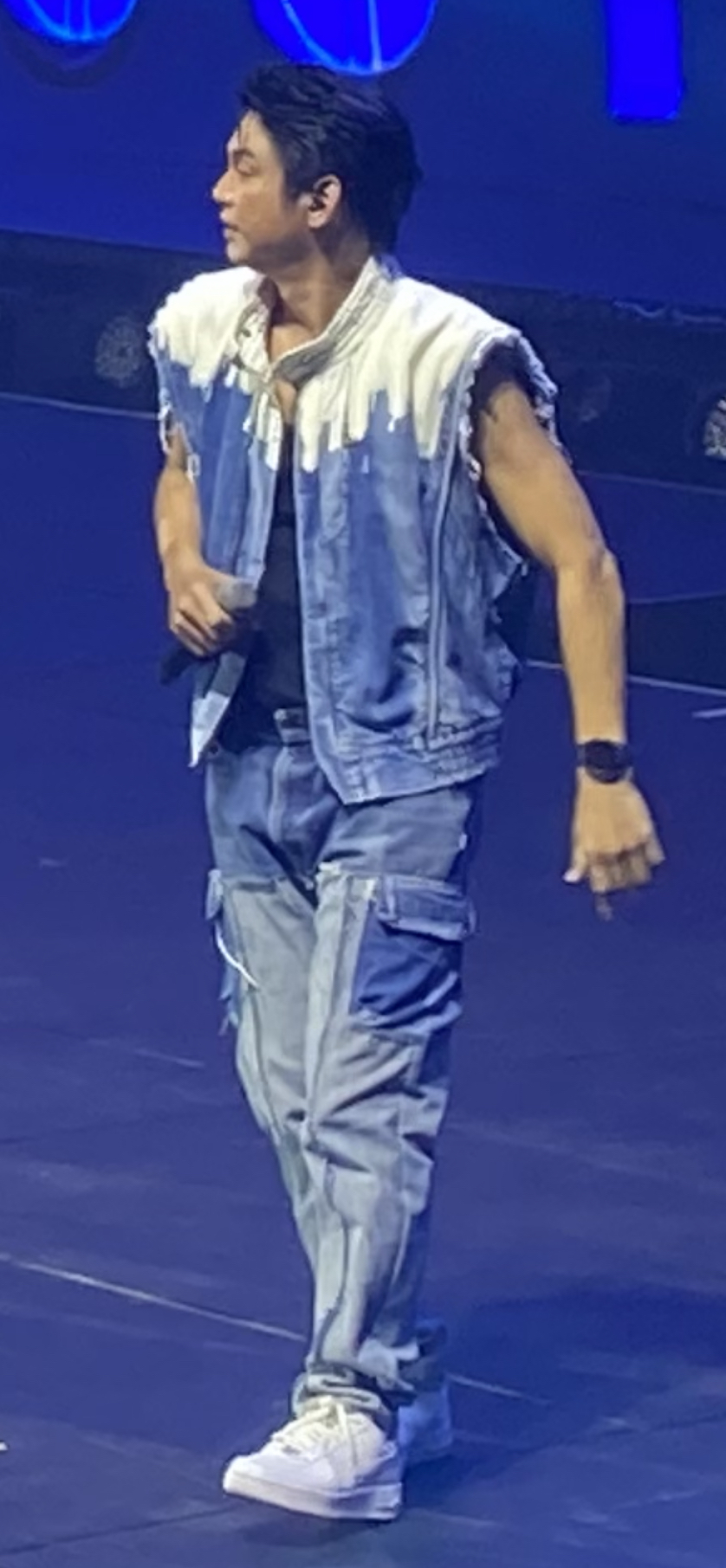
- Touch in 2023

Background information
- Born: Kwantat Na Takuatung; Thai: ขวัญทัศน์ ณ ตะกั่วทุ่ง; February 17, 1969 (age 57); Bangkok Yai, Bangkok, Thailand
- Origin: Bangkok, Thailand
- Genres: Thai Pop; pop rock; pop dance; Luk Thung; Country music; Gospel
- Occupations: Singer; dancer; actor
- Instrument: Vocals
- Years active: 1990–present
- Label: RS Promotion

Touch Na Takuatung or spelt Touch Na Takuathung (Thai: ทัช ณ ตะกั่วทุ่ง), is a Thai pop singer and actor, famous and popular especially in the 1990s.

== Biography and career ==
He was born as Kwantat Na Takuatung (ขวัญทัศน์ ณ ตะกั่วทุ่ง) on the Thonburi side of Bangkok, in the Bangkok Yai district behind Wat Arun Ratchawararam (Temple of Dawn). He had one brother and one sister. During his early childhood, he was sent to live with his grandmother in the Bang Khae area, whom he affectionately called "Grand Mammy". He lived with her until he was six, when she died. After that, he returned to live with his family.

He entered the music industry in the 1980s as a choir singer for well-known bands, and later competed in a singing contest broadcast on Channel 3.

While studying at Ratchadamnoen Commercial School, after finishing junior high at the nearby Taweethapisek School, he formed a band with friends and began performing in pubs at night. In 1990, he had the opportunity to release his debut studio album under RS Promotion, titled Sampas Touch, which combined pop rock and Western country genres, though it was not very successful.

Na Takuatung found success in 1991 with the release of his second studio album Touch Thunder, where he shifted to a pop-dance style blended with rock. He also choreographed his own performances. During this period, he became widely popular and was often compared to Grammy Entertainment's Jetrin Wattanasin. Some songs on the album even leaned toward gospel influences. He went on to release two more studio albums in 1993 and 1995, along with several special albums, and appeared in various films and television series.

In 1997, he was arrested at a condominium near the Tha Phra Intersection after being caught using drugs with friends. His fifth studio album, Touch Cyclone, released in 1998, was banned from radio play due to the scandal. Despite the setback, Na Takuatung released four more studio albums before eventually transitioning to perform luk thung (Thai country music) fused with T-pop.

In early 2007, he graduated with a bachelor's degree in political science from Ramkhamhaeng University.

== Discography ==
- 1990 : Sampas Touch (สัมผัสทัช; "Touch")
- 1991 : Touch Thunder (released; June)
- 1993 : Mahassachan (มหัศจรรย์; "Miracle"; released: April 16)
- 1995 : Touch V-4 (released: April 1)
- 1998 : Touch Cyclone
- 1999 : Touch Happiness (บันเทิงเริงใจ; released: November)
- 2001 : Sparking Touch
- 2014 : Touch Screen

== Filmography ==
Films

- 1992 : The Magic Shoes (รองต๊ะแล่บแปล๊บ; directed by Prachya Pinkaew)
- 1995 : Dark Side Romance (เกิดอีกทีต้องมีเธอ)
- 2001 : Where Is Tong (๙ พระคุ้มครอง; guest appearance)
- 2003 : One Minute To Love (คลื่นฝัน ควันรัก)
- 2004 : Beautiful Wonderful Perfect (เอ๋อเหรอ)
- 2005 : Dek-Dane (เด็กเดน)
- 2005 : Headless Ghost (ศพไร้เงา; direct-to-video)
- 2023 : 4 Kings II (4 คิงส์ 2)

Television series

- 1993 : Dok Kratin Rim Rua
- 1993–94 : Kert Tae Tom (with Suvanant Kongying)
- 1995 : Poot Pissawas
- 1996 : Pakarang See Dum
- 1997 : Rak Rai Andap
- 2000 : Prik Gub Klur
- 2002 : Saeng Dao Fang Talay
- 2005 : Thep-ti-da Rong ngarn
- 2012 : Moo Dang
- 2012 : Rachinee Look Tung
- 2016 : My Bromance

Television shows

- 2017 : The Mask Singer Season 2–Nakak Ngorpa ("Sakai Mask")
