= Preechaya Pongthananikorn =

Thai model and actress

- ปรีชญา พงษ์ธนานิกร
- Born: Preechaya Pongthananikorn; February 14, 1993 (age 32); Bangkok, Thailand
- Occupation(s): Actress, Model, MC, YouTubers
- Years active: 2012–present
- Agents: GTH (2012–2015) GDH 559 (2016–2018); Channel 3 (2018–2021)
- Height: 170 cm (5 ft 7 in)

Preechaya Pongthananikorn (Thai: ปรีชญา พงษ์ธนานิกร; RTGS: Prichaya Phongthananikon; born February 14, 1990), nicknamed Ice, is a Thai model and actress. She is best known in her lead roles in two of the highest grossing Thai films; ATM: Er Rak Error (2012) as Jib and in I Fine..Thank You..Love You (2014) as Tutor Pleng. Later on, Ice appeared on television contests such as The Mask Singer (Thai season 2) in 2017 and Dance Dance Dance Thailand in 2018; reaching to semi-finals in both programs. She then started to play lakorn (Thai drama series) and signed with CH3 Thailand in the same year but decided to go freelance after her contract with them expired in 2021.

== Filmography ==
=== Movies ===
Year	Title	Role	Notes
2012	ATM: Er Rak Error	Jib	
2013	Shopaholic	Shopaholic Girl	
2014	I Fine..Thank You..Love You	Teacher Pleng	
2021	My Boss Is A Serial Killer	Bogee	

=== Television drama ===
Year	Title	Role	Network	Notes
2012	Club Friday The Series	Tip	Green Channel	
2012-2013	Muad Opas The Series - Season 2	Muad Prae	Channel 9 MCOT HD	
2013	Club Friday The Series 3	Nui	Green Channel	
2013-2014	ATM 2: Koo ver Error Er Rak	Jib	GTH On Air	
2015	Namthaa Kammathep	Pairoj / Pailin Ama-raporn	GTH On Air	
2015	Club Friday The Series 6 Pid Tee... Ruk Mai Dai	Pun	GMM 25	
2016	Gasohug	Eve	Line TV	
2016	Love Songs Love Stories Kawee Bod Kao	Dew	GMM 25	
2017	Leh Lub Salub Rarng (Switch)	NokYoong	Channel 3	
2017	Ruk Gun Punlawan (Confusedly In Love)	Tulayana	Channel 3	
2017	Fabulous 30 The Series	Ja	ONE 31	
2020	Payakorn Sorn Ruk (Prophecy of Love)	Rosita	Channel 3	
2021	Maya Sanaeha (Illusion of Love)	Monsicha	Channel 3	
2021	Ruk Nirun Juntra (Love Under The Moonlight)	Tongjan / Mae Im	Channel 3	
2022	Seuk Sanaeha: Kraithong-Chalawan	Tapaothong	Channel 8	

=== Television shows and performances ===
Year	Program	Channel	Notes
2017	The Mask Singer (Thai season 2)	Workpoint TV	Contender: Bolster Mask (Semi-Finalist)
2017	Pond's Thailand: Face Confidence	Line TV	Host (alongside Gubgib Sumontip)
2018	Dance Dance Dance Thailand	Line TV	Contender (Semi-Finalist)
2021	The Wall Song Thailand	Workpoint TV	Guest singer

== Discography ==
=== Music video appearances ===
Title	Artist
Questions of Trust (คำถามของความไว้ใจ)	Sukrit Wisetkaew
Seven Something OST: Approval of Concern (อยากรักต้องไม่กลัวคำว่าเสียใจ)	Endorphine (band)
Not Enough Rest (พักผ่อนไม่เพียงพอ)	No More Tear
Please Let Me Care For You (ขออนุญาต...ห่วงใย)	Jaruwat Cheawaram
Turning A Deaf Ear (หูทวนลม)	Saksit Thangthong
Happy Like Standing On A Mountain (OST: Muad Opas The Series - Season 2)	Soul Mate
ATM 2 Koo Ver Error Er Rak OST: Look Om (ลูกอม)	Ice Preechaya (herself) & Pop Pongkool
Even How Much I Love You, I Don't Want You (รักเท่าไหร่ก็ไม่เอา)	Ten Nararak
Wait (รอ)	Basketband
Lonely Smoke (ควันเหงา)	Praput Pimpama

=== Songs and official soundtracks ===
Title	Notes
Look Om (ลูกอม)	ATM 2: Koo ver Error Er Rak OST
ABC Chakgratuk (ABC ชักกระตุก)	I Fine..Thank You..Love You OST
Sleeping Pill (ยานอนหลับ)	Gasohug OST
Why Should I Love You (ทำไมต้องรักเธอ)	Fabulous 30 The Series OST
Oh Really? (เหรอ)	Play2Project track with Kwang ABnormal
Can We Love Each Other (เรารักกันได้หรือเปล่า)	Ruk Nirun Juntra (Love Under The Moonlight) OST

=== Concerts ===
- GTH Day: Play It Forward (2013)
- 7 Wonders Concert (2015)
- STAR THEQUE GTH 11th Year (2015)

=== Awards ===
- Outstanding Female Rising Star of 2012 from ATM Er Rak Error
- MThai Top Talk Awards 2012
- Thai Film Director Association: Best Actress of 2014 from I Fine Thank You Love You
- Daradaily The Great Awards 4: Best Actress of 2014 from I Fine Thank You Love You
- Osaka Asian Film Festival - Yakushi Pearl Award (International)
- SiamDara Awards 2015: Best Actress from I Fine Thank You Love You

=== Other works ===
- KOI x Kwankao: The Return of Winter Wonderland Fashion Gala
- Dubbing MAMA's voice of Mr. Queen to Thai for Viu (streaming media)

== MC ==
Online

- 20 : Face Confidence On Air Line TV
- 20 : On Air YouTube:Ice preechaya (ยังไม่เริ่ม)
