= Thanapob Leeratanakachorn =

Thai actor, model and singer (born 1994)

- ธนภพ ลีรัตนขจร
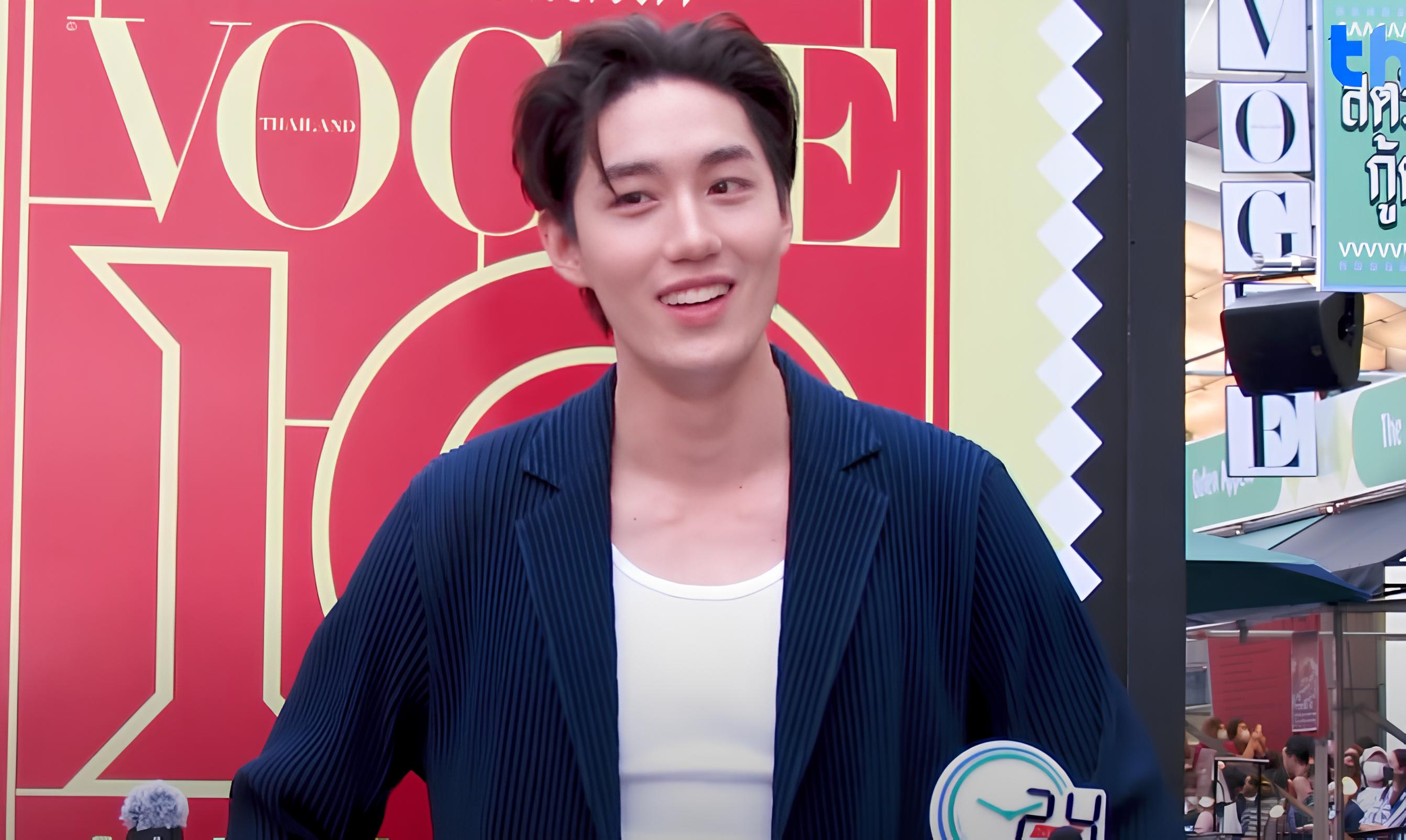
- Thanapob in 2023
- Born: Nutthanun Leeratanakachorn; February 14, 1994 (age 32); Bangkok, Thailand
- Other names: Phongsakorn; Tor
- Education: Kasetsart University (B.S.)
- Occupations: Actor; singer
- Years active: 2011–present
- Agent(s): Nadao Bangkok (2013–2022); TNPLEE.connect (2022–present)
- Height: 1.85 m (6 ft 1 in)
- Parents: Chatchawan Leeratanakachorn (father); Areeya Leeratanakachorn (mother)

Thanapob Leeratanakachorn (Thai: ธนภพ ลีรัตนขจร, RTGS: Thanaphop Liratanakhachon; born 14 February 1994), nicknamed Tor (Thai: ต่อ), is a Chinese-Thai actor and singer. His most notable dramas and films are Hormones: The Series (2013), May Who? (2015), Project S: The Series (2017), In Family We Trust (2018), Man of Vengeance (2019), The Last Promise (2020), and The Giver (2022). He is a former member of the Thai boy group Nine by Nine.

== Personal life and education ==
Thanapob was born on 14 February 1994, and is the youngest child of three in a Thai Chinese family. His Chinese surname is Lee(李). He is the son of Chatchawan and Areeya Leeratanakachorn and has two brothers. He studied at Adventist Ekamai School and graduated at Kasetsart University, with Bachelor of Science degree in Packaging Technology under Department of Packaging and Materials Technology, Faculty of Agro-Industry.

== Career ==
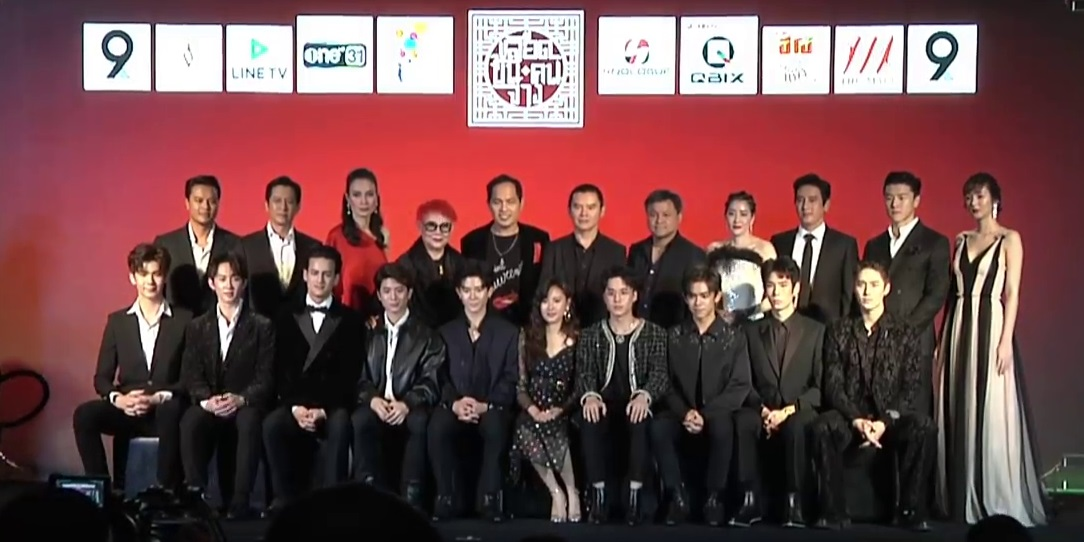
Thanapob with the cast members and executives of In Family We Trust

Thanapob started his career by performing in music videos like "It's Time to Listen" by Da-Endorphine. His debut as a television actor was in the Club Friday: The Series episode "Once in Memory." (2012). In 2013, Thanapob joined Nadao Bangkok and was cast in the popular Thai TV show, Hormones: The Series directed by Songyos Sugmakanan, playing the role of Phai. His role in Hormones became his first notable role and gained him the popularity.

His film debut came with the mystery thriller film The Swimmers (2014) with Hormones cast members, Supassara Thanachat and Chutavuth Pattarakampol. He received the Silver Doll Award for Outstanding Male Rising Star at the 30th Surasawadee Royal Award for playing the role of Tan. He was cast for several series and films afterwards such as Club Friday: The Series (Season 5) (2014), Club Friday The Series Season 5: Secret of Classroom 6/3 (2015), Love o-net (2015), and Stupid Cupid The Series (2015). He appeared for his third film May Who? (2015) and played a main role with Sutatta Udomsilp and Thiti Mahayotaruk. He was nominated for the Best Supporting Actor Award at the 25th Suphannahong National Film Awards for playing the role of Fame.

From 2016 to 2017, Thanapob starred in several television series such as I See You, O-Negative, and The Cupid's Series: Kamathep Parbman. He also took on the role of Gym, an autistic badminton athlete in the Project S: The Series – Side by Side (2017). He received overall positive acclaim for his performance and won him the Best Actor Award at the 9th Nataraj Awards in 2018.

Thanapob debuted as one of the members of the Thai boy group Nine by Nine, a special by 4nologue and Nadao Bangkok in 2018. As an actor, Thanapob said that he struggled in dancing at first due to his minimal skills and uncomfortable feeling because of his height and limbs. As they underwent months of intensive training he felt his improvement because of his co-members' inputs and encouragement from their fans. The group has released a mini-album entitled "En-Route" and he also sang in five of the released singles of the group namely as "Night Light", "Hypnotize", "The Lucky One", "Shouldn't", and "Eternity". He also went on three tours with Nine by Nine across Thailand from 2018–2019.

He starred with his fellow Nine by Nine members in the TV series, In Family We Trust (2018), where he took on the role of Yi. He received critical acclaim and won awards such as the Best Supporting Actor Award at the 10th Nataraj Awards and Actor of the Year at the 2018 GQ Thailand Men of the Year Awards for the role.

After the Nine by Nine project, he took another lead role for television with the action drama series Man of Vengeance (2019) which aired on One 31. He won the Best Actor for Television Series Award at the 16th Komchadleuk Awards for the role of Sila/Aran. He then played in another One 31 series entitled The Last Promise (2020).

Thanapob starred in two films released in 2021 namely as One for the Road which premiered at the 2021 Sundance Film Festival as Thailand's first-ever entry to the festival and in the Netflix original film, Ghost Lab with former Nine by Nine co-member Paris Intarakomalyasut.

In 2021, he was recognized by HOWE Thailand magazine and has been included in its Top 50 Most Influential People List, for his excellence in acting and his contribution to the industry as an influencer and brand endorser.

Thanapob stayed with Nadao Bangkok as one of its actors until the company formally scaled back on its artist management operations on 1 June 2022. Since 1 July 2022, he has a personal management team, named TNPLEE.connect, tasked to manage his career and promote his works and events.

== Filmography ==
=== Films ===
Year	Title	Role	Notes
2013	Mary Is Happy, Mary Is Happy	Pakorn	Guest role
2014	The Swimmers	Tan	Main role
2015	May Who?	Fame	Main role
2021	One for the Road	Boss	Main role
2021	Ghost Lab	Cheewee Prometheus (Dr. Wee)	Main role

=== Television series ===
Year	Title	Role	Network	Notes
2012	Club Friday The Series 1	Tor (Num Nam Dang)	Green Channel	
2013	Hormones	Phai	GMM One	
2014	Hormones: Season 2	Phai	GTH On Air	
2015	Club Friday The Series Season 5	Tee	GMM 25	
2015	Hormones: Season 3	Phai	One 31	Cameo
2015	Stupid Cupid The Series	Takeshi (Young)	GMM 25	Cameo
2016–2017	O-Negative	Yuttakarn Kanchanavipu (Puen)	GMM 25	
2016	I See You: The Series	Pramate Phattharaphongsa (Dr. Mean)	GMM 25	
2017	Kammathep Papmarn	DanChon	Channel 3	
2017	Project S: The Series – Side by Side	Sakkaya Piriroj (Yim)	GMM 25	
2017	Leh Lub Salub Rarng	Arkom	Channel 3	
2017	Project S The Series: Shoot! I Love You	Sakkaya Piriroj (Yim)	GMM 25	Cameo
2018	Into the Light with 9x9	Himself	Line TV	Musical series
2018	In Family We Trust	Asawa Suriyapirot (Yi)	One 31	
2019	The Journey of 9x9 Documentary	Himself	Line TV	
2019	Man of Vengeance	Sila Wisetworawet / Aran Ritthinatkosol (Tor/Si)	One 31	
2019	Project 17: Side By Side	Thanapob	Youku	Cameo
2019	The Stranded	Northern kids	Netflix	Cameo
2020	The Last Promise	Thichong (Chong)	One 31	
2022	The Giver	Tailah Varakul (Lah)	One 31	
2023	Midnight Museum	Khatha	GMM 25	
2024	My Cherie Amour	Wichai Waratabut	Channel 3	
2024	Spare Me Your Mercy	Kantaphat Akkharamethi (Kan)	One 31	

== Discography ==
Year	Song title	Album	Ref.
2014	โชคดีนะเพื่อน ("Good Luck Friends") (Cover)	OST. Hormones Season 2	
2015	เพียงชายคนนี้ (ไม่ใช่ผู้วิเศษ) ("Just A Man, Not A Magician")	Very Handsome Concert Live Album	
2018	"NIGHT LIGHT"	NINE BY NINE (en Route)	
2018	"Hypnotize"	NINE BY NINE (en Route)	
2019	ผู้โชคดี ("The Lucky One")	NINE BY NINE (en Route)	
2019	ไม่น่าเจอเลย ("Shouldn’t")	NINE BY NINE (en Route)	
2019	"Eternity"	NINE BY NINE (en Route)	
2019	หัวใจของเธอ ("Your Heart") (Cover)	OST. Man of Vengeance	
2020	รักเธอสุดหัวใจ ("Love You With All My Heart") (Cover) with Two Popetorn	OST. The Last Promise	

== Awards and nominations ==
Award	Year	Category	Nominee / Work	Result	Ref.
Asia Contents Awards	2020	Best Actor	In Family We Trust	Nominated	
Bangkok Critics Assembly Awards	2016	Best Supporting Actor	May Who?	Nominated	
Bangkok Critics Assembly Awards	2023	Best Actor	One for the Road	Nominated	
Daradaily Awards	2018	Best Actor	Project S The Series: Side by Side	Nominated	
Daradaily Awards	2019	Best Actor	In Family We Trust	Nominated	
Global Star Media Awards	2022	Actor of the Year	The Giver	Won	
GQ Thailand Men of the Year	2018	Actor of the Year	In Family We Trust	Won	
HOWE Awards	2022	Best Actor	The Giver	Won	
Kazz Awards	2014	Hot New Male Star	Hormones	Won	
Kazz Awards	2014	Popular Male Teen Celebrity	Thanapob Leeratanakachorn	Nominated	
Kazz Awards	2017	Popular Male Teen Star	Thanapob Leeratanakachorn	Nominated	
Kazz Awards	2017	Male Popular Vote	Thanapob Leeratanakachorn	Nominated	
Kazz Awards	2017	Male Rising Star	Thanapob Leeratanakachorn	Nominated	
Kazz Awards	2019	Male Young Star of the Year	Thanapob Leeratanakachorn	Won	
Kazz Awards	2021	Best Actor of the Year	Thanapob Leeratanakachorn	Nominated	
Kazz Awards	2022	Male Young Star of the Year	Thanapob Leeratanakachorn	Won	
Kerd Awards	2013	Born Scorching Award	Hormones	Nominated	
Komchadluek Awards	2019	Best Supporting Actor for Television Series	In Family We Trust	Nominated	
Komchadluek Awards	2020	Best Actor for Television Series	Man of Vengeance	Won	
Komchadluek Awards	2021	Popular Male Actor of the Year	The Last Promise	Nominated	
Komchadluek Awards	2022	Best Actor for Film	Ghost Lab	Nominated	
Komchadluek Awards	2023	Best Leading Performance for Film	One for the Road	Nominated	
Komchadluek Awards	2023	Best Actor for Television Series	The Giver	Nominated	
LINE TV Awards	2018	Best Fight Scene	Project S The Series: Side by Side (with Wongravee Nateetorn)	Won	
LINE TV Awards	2019	Best Fight Scene	In Family We Trust (with Krissanapoom Pibulsonggram)	Nominated	
LINE TV Awards	2019	Best Song	"Night Light" (with Nine by Nine)	Nominated	
LINE TV Awards	2020	Best Couple	Man of Vengeance (with Nopjira Lerkkajornnamkul)	Nominated	
LINE TV Awards	2021	Best Dramatic Scene	The Last Promise (with Taksaorn Paksukcharern)	Won	
Maya Awards	2015	Best Couple	Hormones (with Supassara Thanachart)	Nominated	
Maya Awards	2022	Charming Young Man of the Year	Thanapob Leeratanakachorn	Nominated	
Maya Awards	2022	Best Actor for Leading Role	Thanapob Leeratanakachorn	Nominated	
MThai Top Talk-About Awards	2019	Top Talk-About Artist	Nine by Nine	Won	
Nataraj Awards	2018	Best Actor	Project S The Series: Side by Side	Won	
Nataraj Awards	2019	Best Supporting Actor	In Family We Trust	Won	
Nataraj Awards	2019	Best Team Ensemble	In Family We Trust	Won	
Nataraj Awards	2020	Best Actor	Man of Vengeance	Nominated	
Nataraj Awards	2021	Best Actor	The Last Promise	Won	
Nataraj Awards	2023	Best Actor	The Giver	Won	
Nataraj Awards	2025	Best Actor in Primetime Long-Form Drama	My Cherie Amour	Nominated	
Nine Entertainment Awards	2019	Actor of the Year	In Family We Trust	Nominated	
Siam Series Awards	2021	Popular Lead Actor	The Last Promise	Nominated	
Siamdara Awards	2014	Male Rising Star	Hormones	Won	
Siamdara Awards	2016	Popular Male Star	Thanapob Leeratanakachorn	Nominated	
Suphannahong National Film Awards	2016	Best Supporting Actor	May Who?	Nominated	
Suphannahong National Film Awards	2023	Best Actor	One for the Road	Nominated	
Surasawadee Royal Awards	2015	Silver Doll Award for Outstanding Male Rising Star	The Swimmers	Won	
Thai Film Director Awards	2016	Best Supporting Actor	May Who?	Won	
Thai Film Director Awards	2023	Best Ensemble	One for the Road	Runner-up	
Thailand Master Youth Awards	2019	Inspiring People Award	Thanapob Leeratanakachorn	Won	
TV Gold Awards	2018	Best Lead Actor	Project S The Series: Side by Side	Nominated	
TV Gold Awards	2021	Best Lead Actor	The Last Promise	Nominated	
TV Gold Awards	2023	Best Lead Actor	The Giver	Nominated	
White TV Awards	2021	Best Ensemble Cast	In Family We Trust	Won	
Zen Stylish Awards	2014	Male Outstanding Style of the Year	Thanapob Leeratanakachorn	Won	
Mint Awards 2025	2025	Best of Mint Six Pack (Special Award)	Thanapob Leeratanakachorn	Nominated	
