= Udomsilp =

Udomsilp (Thai: อุดมศิลป์, RTGS: Udomsin) is a Thai name, used as both a given name and a surname. Notable people with the name include:

== Given name ==
- Udomsilp Sornbutnark (born 1948), Thai footballer

== Surname ==
- Rawee Udomsilp (born 1997), Thai footballer
- Sutatta Udomsilp (born 1997), Thai actress
