= Jirayu La-ongmanee =

Thai actor and singer (born 1995)

- จิรายุ ละอองมณี
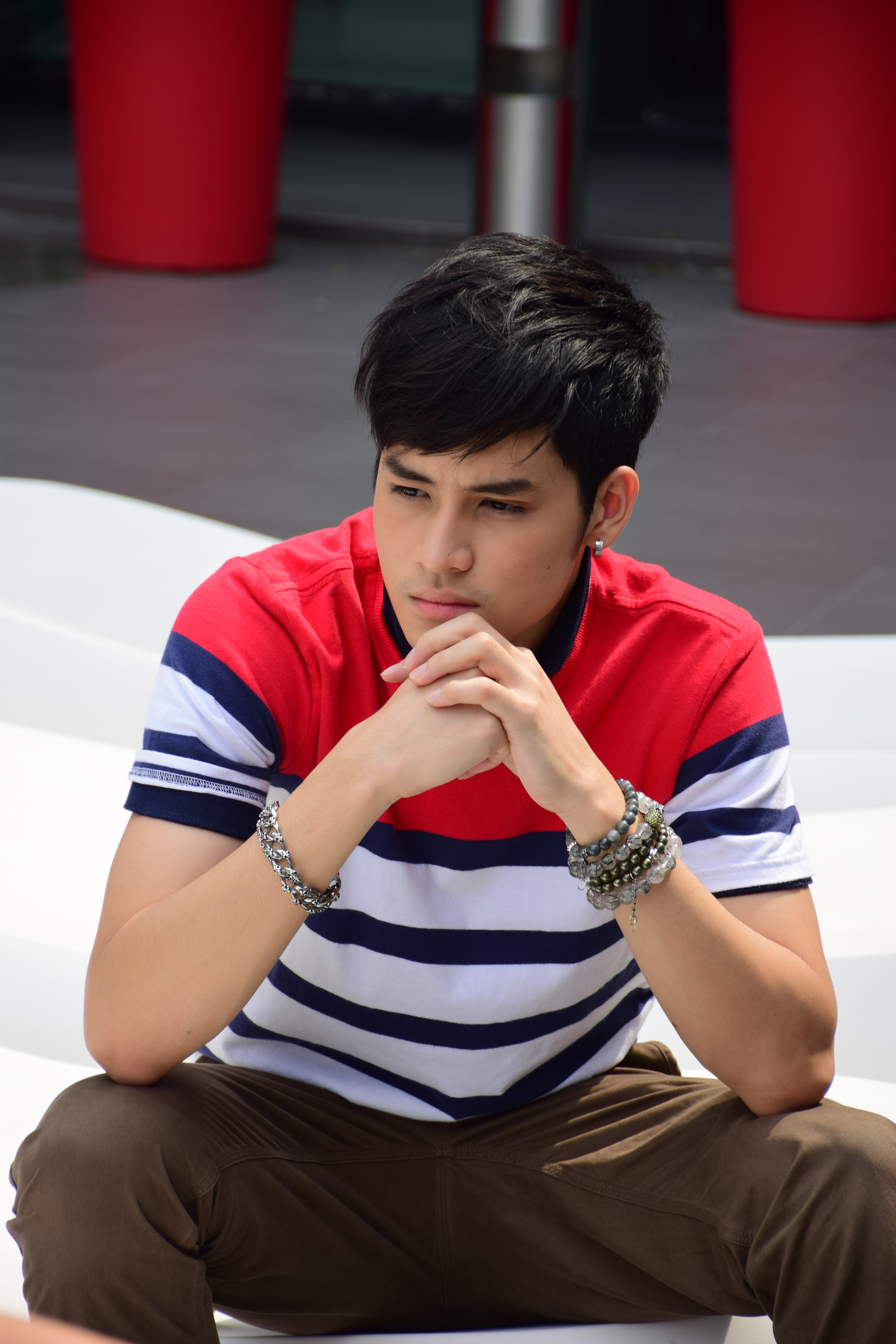
- Jirayu in 2014
- Born: 29 October 1995 (age 30); Rayong, Thailand
- Other name: Kao (เก้า)
- Education: Srinakharinwirot University
- Occupations: Actor; singer
- Years active: 2001–present

Jirayu La-ongmanee (Thai: จิรายุ ละอองมณี; RTGS: Chirayu La-ongmani; born 29 October 1995), nicknamed Kao (Thai: เก้า), is a Thai actor and singer. He has starred in several Thai films and television series and has done advertising work. Currently, he is also the vocalist for Retrospect and a guitarist of Bad Baboon

== Early life and education ==
Jirayu La-ongmanee was born in Rayong and moved to Bangkok when he was 3 months old with his mother, Woranuch La-ongmanee. He went to Amatyakul School and entered the entertainment industry at the age of five. Jirayu graduated with a bachelor's degree from the College of Social Communication Innovation, Srinakharinwirot University, and a master's degree from the School of Communication Arts, Sripatum University.

== Career ==
Jirayu began acting in several television soap operas (lakorn), becoming widely noted for his role as Santi in 2005 Fa Krachang Dao. He was then invited to try for a cinematic role in King Naresuan, in which he played the role of young Boonthing. He has since acted in four other films and has numerous television and advertising work.

Jirayu gained popularity after he starred in the 2011 Thai comedy film, SuckSeed. He won Daradaiy The GREAT Awards 2011 Best Actor for the role. After his success from SuckSeed, in 2012 La-ongmanee starred opposite Nattasha Nauljam in a short movie "Just a Second" and Sutatta Udomsilp in a romantic film, Seven Something, directed by Jira Maligool, Adisorn Trisirikasem and Paween Purikitpanya. He won the 29th Saraswati Royal Awards Best Supporting Actor for the film.

In 2016, he played a lead role in "O-Negative, Love can't be designed ".

Due to the popularity of Jirayu in Indonesia, he has promoted his movies in Indonesia twice, in 2014 for Chiang Khan Story and in 2015 for Joe Hua Tang Mo.

Jirayu started his musical career again by forming a band called "SLEEPRUNWAY BAND" in 2015, he was a vocal and guitarist. They released a single entitled "SLEEPRUNWAY". In 2016, he released a new single, "Thuk Yang Man Plian Pai Laew" (Everything Has Changed).

In 2022, Jirayu performed as a special guest with Retrospect at the Migrants in Kaoshiung Music Festival 2022 in Kaoshiung. He played alongside the band's three other members. In March 2023, Retrospect announced that Kao Jirayu would become their official vocalist, replacing Nap who left the band in 2020. Kao Jirayu received a lot of support from fans. In July of the same year, Retrospect released their new single, "ชีวิตหลังความตาย (afterlife)." This marked Retrospect's comeback to making music with Jirayu as their lead vocalist.

== Filmography ==
List of acting performances in film
| Title | Year | Role | Notes |
|---|---|---|---|
| Jan Bin (UFO) | 2005 | | |
| King Naresuan Part 1 | 2007 | Young Boonthing | |
| King Naresuan Part 2 | 2007 | Young Boonthing | |
| The Love of Siam | 2007 | Young Tong | |
| Ma Mha 2 | 2007 | Jher(Dog), voice only | |
| BitterSweet BoydPod The Short Film | 2008 | Kao (Past.It's crazy) | |
| Phobia 2 | 2009 | Pey (segment "Novice") | Nominated - Thailand National Film Association Awards for Best Actor; Won - Top Awards (TV Pool Magazine / Suan Dusit Poll) for Best Rising Actor (cinema); Won - Starpics Awards (Starpics Magazine) for Best Supporting Actor |
| Love Julinsee | 2011 | Yok | |
| SuckSeed | 2011 | Ped | Won - Daradaiy The GREAT Awards 2011 for Best Actor |
| Just A Second Mini Movie | 2012 | Jirayu | |
| Seven Something | 2012 | Puanz Yokee | Nominated - 10th Kom Chad Luek Awards for Best Actor; Won - 29th Saraswati Royal Awards for Best Supporting Actor |
| Last Summer | 2013 | Singh | Was voted by the public as one of the 100 Most Spicy Idols 2013 from magazines Spicy; Won - Saraswati award ceremony of the 29th branch of the Supporting Male |
| Chiang Khan Story | 2014 | Tukkae Rak Pang Mak | Won - Thailand National Film Association Awards for Best Actor; Won - Kazz Award 2014 streak teen idol; Won - BIOSCOPE AWARDS for Actor of the Year |
| Joe Hua Tang Mo | 2015 | Joe | |
| Once Upon A Star | 2023 | Kao | Netflix film |

== TV series ==
List of acting performances in television
| Title | Year | Role | Channel |
|---|---|---|---|
| Phin Prai | 2001 | - | Channel 7 |
| Phee Khee Ngao | 2003 | Little ghost "Han-Sa" | Channel ITV |
| Tep Sam Rue Doo | 2003 | Young Phra Pi-roon | Channel 7 |
| Duen Dued | 2004 | Nam Yen | Channel 7 |
| Kru Whai Jai Rai | 2004 | Som-Chai | Channel 3 |
| Puen Rak with Renante Reloza | 2005 | Phu-Chong | Channel 3 |
| Fah Kra Jang Dao | 2005 | San-Ti | Channel 7 |
| Kaew Tah Pee | 2006 | A-Maj | Channel 3 |
| Pheo Fai Nai Fan | 2006 | Young Ku-Lhab | Channel 7 |
| Phik Tai Kub Bai Khao | 2008 | Young Bai-Khao | Channel 3 |
| Kho Ma Had Sa Jan | 2008 | Pom | Channel 7 |
| Sood Tae Jai Ja Khwai Khwa | 2008 | Porn-Pood | Channel 3 |
| Khae Roi Rak | 2008 | Phien-Fah | Channel 3 |
| Mae Kha Ka Nhom Waan | 2009 | Thong-Yhod | Channel 3 |
| Butterfly and Flowers | 2010 | Hu Yan | ThaiPBS |
| Khu Khaen Saen Rak | 2011 | Iaw | Channel 7 |
| Club Friday The Series 4 | 2014 | Ter | GMM 25 |
| L. AOL life thinking positively | 2015 | Pan | True4u |
| Fly To Fin | 2015 | Cun | True4u |
| Club Friday The Series 5 | 2015 | Ter | GMM 25 |
| Club Friday To Be Continued | 2016 | Ter | GMM 25 |
| O-Negative | 2016 | Art | GMM 25 |
| The Single Mother's | 2017 | - | Channel 3 |
| Lakhr khn | 2017 | Khun Siwa | GMM 25 |
| Khwam rak khrang sudthay | 2017 | Phat | GMM 25 |
| Ngao (2018) | 2018 | Isara | GMM 25 |
| One Year 365 | 2019 | Boom | LINE TV |
| Hoh Family | 2019 | Moopa | Workpoint TV |
| Daai Daeng | 2019 | Poh Poh | Channel 3 |
| Girl Next Room Security Love | 2020 | Faigun Phuangmaha (Fai) | GMM 25 |
| Ban Sao Sod (2020) | 2020 | Yodchai (Chai) | GMM 25 |
| Kem Son Plai | 2022 | Chan Jarasroadwong | Channel 7 |
| Nang Nak Saphai Phra Khanong | 2023 | Mak | Workpoint TV |
| The Lady and Her Lovers (Thong Pra Kai Saed) | 2024 | Pisut | One 31 |

== Endorsements ==
| Year | Title | Note |
|---|---|---|
| 2002-2003 | Toothpaste "Colgate" | (Shoot in Singapore) |
| 2002-2003 | Shampoo "Life Boy" | (Shoot and On air in Indonesia) |
| 2005 | Detergent "Breeze" | 2 TVC |
| 2008 | Ovaltine malt calcium | - |
| 2010 | Pepsi Football 2010 | - |
| 2010 | Wafer "Shiang Hai" | - |
| 2010 | Motorcycle "Yamaha Fino" | - |
| 2011 | Powder "Babi Mild Sweety Pink" | - |
| 2011 | Soybean milk "Mew" | - |
| 2011 | Pepsi Bodyslam vs. Suckseed | - |
| 2012 | Powder "Babi Mild Sweety Pink Plus" | |
| 2012 | CAT 009 | - |
| 2012 | Wuttisak clinic | - |
| 2012 | Nokia Asha Smart Phone | - |
| 2012 | Gambol Spider | - |
| 2013 | Pepsi minutes only | - |
| 2013 | FarmHouse Live Fresh Always | Life freshness all around |
| 2013 | FarmHouse Donut Cake | - |
| 2014 | True wisdom planting | - |
| 2014 | Adidas NEO | - |
| 2014 | NUVO tape | - |
| 2015 | Adidas NEO | - |
| 2015 | Products Flea Control Line | - |
| 2015 | Oishi | - |
| 2016 | NUVO tape | - |
| 2016 | Tasto Fit | - |
| 2016 | Adidas Neo | - |
| 2020 | Soda LEO | - |
| 2020 | Birdy Black And Robusta LOW SUGAR | - |

== Concerts ==
| Year | Title | Place |
|---|---|---|
| 2011 | Suckseed Day | SF World Cinema Central World |
| 2011 | Chick Mountain Music Festival | Training camps |
| 2011 | SUPERSTAR ON STAGE | Impact Arena, Muang Thong Thani |
| 2012 | GTH FUN FACE | SANTORINI PARK CHA-AM |
| 2012 | GTH Day Play It Forward | Chulalongkorn Stadium |
| 2015 | T-Pop Fest 2015 music festival in Thailand | Ram Palace Petchaburi |
| 2015 | STAR theque GTH concert 11 light-years away | Impact Arena, Muang Thong Thani |
| 2016 | Guest at Timmy Xu Concert "First Light" Asia Tour | Thunder Dome, Muang Thong Thani |

== Discography ==
- Deep in my heart (Acoustic) Ost. SuckSeed
- Just A Second
- But do not tell me much (Music Club Friday The Series one time in my memory ... I do not).
- What better way to Ost. Last Summer
- I love the original (album Project Love Pill 2 by Fongbeer).
- SLEEPRUNWAY : Jirayu La-ongmanee x SLEEP RUNWAY BAND
- It changed everything: Jirayu La-ongmanee x SLEEP RUNWAY BAND
- Diary : Jirayu La-ongmanee x SLEEP RUNWAY BAND
- ชีวิตหลังความตาย (afterlife)- Retrospect
- อยู่เพื่อจำ (Irreplaceable) - Retrospect

== Music video ==
- "The man who killed me" - Dome Pakorn Lum (OST.5 junction).
- "Sugar Eyes" - Sugar Buckeyes
- "Up" - Jida
- "Wink" - Orange Marine
- "I do not like my friends" - Orange Marine
- "Deep in my heart" - Big Ass ( OST.SuckSeed ).
- "I like tonight" - Kob Taxi
- "Number two" - Britney Sants Bhirombhakdi.
- "I would not be afraid regrets" - David Archuleta (OST. Seven Something).

== MC ==
Television

- 20 : On Air

Online

- 2022 : POKE 9 EP.1 : ศึกลิงตัดลิง On Air YouTube:Kao Jirayu

== Awards ==
Awards
| Year | Award | Category | Nominated work | Result |
|---|---|---|---|---|
| 2009 | Top Awards | Male Rising Star | Phobia 2 | Won |
| 2009 | 19th Suphannahong National Film Awards | Best Leading Actor | Phobia 2 | Nominated |
| 2009 | Starpics Thai Film Awards | Best Leading Actor | Phobia 2 | Won |
| 2009 | 7th Komchatluek awards | Best Leading Actor | Phobia 2 | Nominated |
| 2009 | 18th Entertainment Club Awards | Best Leading Actor | Phobia 2 | Nominated |
| 2010 | 8th Komchatluek awards | Best Leading Actor | Butterfly and Flowers | Won |
| 2010 | Young & Smart Vote Awards | Male Rising Star | Butterfly and Flowers | Won |
| 2011 | Dara Daily The Great Awards | Best Actor | SuckSeed | Won |
| 2012 | Nine Entertain Awards | Song Of The Year | | Nominated |
| 2012 | Phika-Made Awards | Role Model Of The Year | | Won |
| 2012 | Entertainment Club awards | Song Of The Year | | Nominated |
| 2012 | Thai Entertainment Press Association Awards | Best Supporting Actor | 7 Something | Won |
| 2013 | Spicy Magazine | 100 Most Spicy Idols | | Won |
| 2013 | 23rd Suphannahong National Film Awards | Best Leading Actor | Last Summer | Nominated |
| 2013 | 23rd Suphannahong National Film Awards | Popular Volt | Last Summer | Nominated |
| 2013 | Chom Rom Vi Jarn Entertainment Awards | Best Leading Actor | Last Summer | Nominated |
| 2014 | Kazz Awards | Teen Choice | | Won |
| 2014 | Bioscope Awards | Actor Of The Year | Chiang Khan Story | Won |
| 2014 | 12th Star Pics Thai Film Awards | Best Leading Actor | Chiang Khan Story | Won |
| 2014 | 24th Suphannahong National Film Awards | Best Leading Actor | Chiang Khan Story | Won |
| 2014 | Entertainment Club Awards | Best Leading Actor | Chiang Khan Story | Won |
| 2014 | 12th Komchatluek awards | Best Leading Actor | Chiang Khan Story | Won |
