= Idol on Quiz =

South Korean variety show

- Idol on Quiz Promotional Poster
- Also known as: Idols Above the Quiz
- Hangul: 퀴즈 위의 아이돌
- RR: Kwijeu wiui aidol
- MR: K'wijŭ wiŭi aidol
- Genre: Variety show Quiz show
- Presented by: Jung Hyung-don; Jang Sung-kyu; Kim Jong-min (Koyote)
- Country of origin: South Korea
- Original language: Korean
- No. of seasons: 1
- No. of episodes: 20

Production
- Production location: South Korea
- Running time: 55 minutes

Original release
- Network: KBS2
- Release: July 20 – December 5, 2020

Idol on Quiz (Korean: 퀴즈 위의 아이돌) is a South Korean quiz variety television program that aired on KBS2. It often features a combination of native Korean and global idols from various groups as guests.

On November 6, 2020, it was confirmed that Jung Hyung-don will step down from the show after the episode on November 21 due to his hiatus. Kim Jong-min, originally a fixed guest of the show, will temporarily replace Jung as the co-host alongside Jang Sung-kyu. It was reported that the last recordings for the show were completed on November 11, and the show concluded on December 5.

== Airtime ==
Air date	Airtime
July 30 – September 28, 2020	Mondays at 8:30 PM KST
October 10 – December 5, 2020	Saturdays at 11:30 AM KST

== Cast ==
=== Hosts ===
Name	Episode
Jang Sung-kyu	1–20
Kim Jong-min (Koyote)	19–20
Jung Hyung-don	1–18

=== Senior-dols ===
Name	Episode
Fixed Guests
Nichkhun (2PM)	7–20
Kangnam	7–20
Yoon Bo-mi (Apink)	7–14
Kim Jong-min (Koyote)	7–18
Special Guests
Inseong (SF9)	15–16
Yubin	17–20
Andy (Shinhwa)	19–20

== Overview ==
In each episode, guests are in two teams and three rounds of quizzes (two rounds from episode 7) are held. The team with more accumulated points wins, and the prize money will be donated, under the winning team's names, to the bursary (provided by King Sejong Institute) which helps people outside South Korea studying the Korean language and the Korean culture.

=== Quizzes ===
Quiz Name	Description
Idol Exploding	Also simply known as "Choose One of Two"; Each team chooses a set of questions and one member will answer a question by choosing one option out of two given, by cutting either the yellow or blue wire representing the options; The process goes on until a member answered his/her question wrongly. The team will end their round and the bombs will explode; Each correct answer gets 10 marks for the team; Each team will attempt two sets of questions; In the final part of the game, the MCs will each go for double of their respective teams' points for this round when the question is correctly answered; As Game 1 from episode 5 onward
Idol Leaning Back	Also simply known as "Choose One of Three"; Both teams will send one member to answer a question that consists of three choices (one correct answer and two wrong answers); Both members will choose an answer by sitting on either the red, yellow or blue chair, but both cannot choose the same chair; If one member gets the correct answer, he/she will get 20 points for the team, and will continue to answer the next question; If one or both members picked the wrong answer(s), they will be punished by having the chair(s) leaned back, and will be eliminated; The game ends when one team has all their members eliminated; As Game 2 from episode 7 onward
Dance Recipe	Five levels of detailed, step-by-step descriptions of the dance are said out; At any level, one contestant can attempt to answer the correct song title, its singer and do the dance move; Originally between Games 2 and 3, currently as pre-Game 1, for the teams to fight for the right to choose the MC first
Idol Above Consonants	Survival consonants quiz (normal terms version or song lyrics version); When only 2 contestants are left, they will each say out a term until one contestant cannot say out a term or said a wrong term - the contestant that didn't wins the battle; 8 contestants → 6 → 4 → 3 → 2 → 1 final winner; As Game 2 for episodes 1-6, before being replaced by Idol Leaning Back; Returned as pre-Game 2, for the teams to fight for the right to start Game 2 first
Idol Above Speed	Limited time 20-question speed quiz with the hosts, quiz ends when the character is caught up (or when all 20 questions are successfully answered); When explaining to a member who doesn't know the answer, the team can pass the member and let the next member attempt to answer; Best of three rounds; 1st round: MCs explaining to their respective teams; 2nd (and 3rd) round: One member of the team explaining to the rest of the team's members, and only one MC chance can be used; As Game 1 for episodes 1-4, before being replaced by Idol Exploding; Returned as pre-Game 2, for the teams to fight for the right to start Game 2 first
Idol Above Correct Answers	Find the correct keywords; Only one challenger from each team will represent their teams for this round; If the challenger from one team does not choose the wrong keyword throughout the game, the team's total points earned from the round would be doubled; As Game 3 for episodes 1-6

== Episodes ==
- In the ratings below, the highest rating for the show will be in red and the lowest rating for the show will be in blue.

=== 2020 ===
Ep.	Broadcast Date	Guest(s)		Winning Team (Final Score)	Ratings (Nielsen Korea) (Nationwide)
Ep.	Broadcast Date	Led by Jang Sung-kyu	Led by Jung Hyung-don	Winning Team (Final Score)	Ratings (Nielsen Korea) (Nationwide)
1	July 20	Good Boys; Seventeen (Joshua, Jun, Hoshi, DK)	Oath of the Peach Garden; Seventeen (The8, Seungkwan, Vernon, Dino)	Good Boys (350:210)	1.6%
2	July 27	PentaB; BtoB (Seo Eun-kwang, Peniel), Pentagon (Yuto, Kino)	Cube Girl; CLC (Sorn, Jang Ye-eun), (G)I-DLE (Soojin, Yuqi)	No Winner (150:150)	1.3%
3	August 3	Stray Kids (Bang Chan, Lee Know, Hyunjin, Felix)	The Boyz (Jacob, Juyeon, Kevin, New)	Stray Kids (180:80)	0.9%
4	August 10	Oh My Girl (Hyojung, Mimi, Seunghee, Binnie)	GFriend (Yerin, Eunha, Yuju, Umji)	Oh My Girl (130:80)	1.7%
5	August 17	Eunji Team; Apink (Jung Eun-ji, Kim Nam-joo), Weeekly (Lee Soo-jin, Jihan)	Bomi Team; Apink (Yoon Bo-mi, Oh Ha-young), Victon (Choi Byung-chan, Jung Su-bin)	Bomi Team (Note: Winning team decided by rock paper scissors) (250:250)	1.3%
6	August 24	April (Kim Chae-won, Lee Na-eun, Rachel, Lee Jin-sol)	Lovelyz (Lee Mi-joo, Kei, Ryu Su-jeong, Jeong Ye-in)	April (180:120)	1.4%
7	August 31	Monsta X (Shownu, Minhyuk, Kihyun, Joohoney)	Whitening (Senior-dols)	Monsta X (100:50)	1.1%
8	September 7	Red Dragon (Senior-dols)	SF9 (Inseong, Jaeyoon, Hwiyoung, Chani)	Red Dragon (120:20)	2.0%
9	September 14	Andy & Teen Top; Andy (Shinhwa), Teen Top (Niel, Ricky, Changjo)	Senior-dols	Andy & Teen Top (120:100)	1.4%
10	September 21	Senior-dols	Pink Idol Squad; Ha Sung-woon, Jeong Se-woon, UP10TION (Lee Jin-hyuk, Kim Woo-seok)	Senior-dols (50:40)	1.6%
11	September 28	Senior-dols	Trot-dols; Park Hyun-bin, Ryu Ji-kwang, Roh Ji-hoon, Hwang Yun-sung (Romeo)	Trot-dols (80:100)	2.0%
12	October 10	Annou-dols; Jo Woo-jong, Kim Il-joong, Lee Ji-ae, Oh Jeong-yeon	Senior-dols	Senior-dols (50:70)	1.4%
13	October 17	Innocent-dols; Shin Ji (Koyote), Yubin, Kim Nam-joo (Apink), Solji (EXID)	Senior-dols	Innocent-dols (60:40)	1.2%
14	October 24	Senior-dols	AB6IX	AB6IX (50:60)	1.3%
15	October 31	Senior-dols	IZ*ONE (Sakura Miyawaki, Choi Ye-na, An Yu-jin, Jang Won-young)	IZ*ONE (20:40)	1.2%
16	November 7	Senior-dols	Twice (Momo, Sana, Dahyun, Tzuyu)	Senior-dols (50:30)	1.2%
17	November 14	Mamamoo	Senior-dols	Mamamoo (110:0)	1.2%
18	November 21	Senior-dols	NCT (Doyoung, Jungwoo, Haechan, Chenle)	Senior-dols (80:60)	1.1%
Ep.	Broadcast Date	Guest(s)		Winning Team (Final Score)	Ratings (Nielsen Korea) (Nationwide)
Ep.	Broadcast Date	Led by Jang Sung-kyu	Led by Kim Jong-min	Winning Team (Final Score)	Ratings (Nielsen Korea) (Nationwide)
19	November 28	Senior-dols	Junior-dols; Weki Meki (Choi Yoo-jung, Kim Do-yeon), fromis 9 (Jang Gyu-ri, Roh Ji-sun)	Junior-dols (40:120)	1.4%
20	December 5	Senior-dols	Got7 (Jackson, Jinyoung, BamBam, Yugyeom)	Senior-dols (80:30)	1.2%
