= May Who? =

- Theatrical release poster
- เมย์ไหน..ไฟแรงเฟร่อ
- Directed by: Chayanop Boonprakob
- Written by: Chayanop Boonprakob; Nottapon Boonprakob; Vasudhorn Piyaromna; Thodsapon Thiptinnakorn
- Produced by: Chayanop Boonprakob; Jira Maligool; Vanridee Pongsittisak
- Starring: Sutatta Udomsilp; Thiti Mahayotaruk; Thanapob Leeratanakajorn
- Cinematography: Khaneh Khongkha; Boonyanuch Kraithong; Nottapon Boonprakob
- Edited by: Panayu Kunvanlee; Riff Animation Studio (animation)
- Music by: Vichaya Vatanasapt
- Production company: Jorkwang Films
- Distributed by: GTH
- Release date: 1 October 2015
- Running time: 121 minutes
- Country: Thailand
- Language: Thai
- Box office: $2,216,783 (approx. ฿79,120,310.44)

May Who? (Thai: เมย์ไหน..ไฟแรงเฟร่อ; RTGS: Me Nai Fai Raeng Froe; Thai pronunciation: [meː˧ näj˩˩˦ fäj˧ rɛːŋ˧ frɤː˥˩]) is a 2015 Thai romantic comedy film directed by Chayanop Boonprakob starring Sutatta Udomsilp, Thiti Mahayotaruk and Thanapob Leeratanakajorn. The film, produced and distributed by GMM Tai Hub premiered in Thailand on October 1, 2015. It was the last film to be produced and distributed by GTH before defunct in December 2015 as a result of internal conflicts.

== Synopsis ==
Pong (Thiti Mahayotaruk) is a high-school outcast who loves to draw. He turns his daily activities into comic book stories, making his real-life crush, Ming (Narikun Ketprapakorn) the female protagonist and himself as the hero. One day, he accidentally submits his comic book to the teacher. May Nhai (Sutatta Udomsilp), another high-school outcast who has the ability to discharge electricity when her heart rate rises, discovers Pong's book. When she reveals his book to the entire class, including Ming, Pong tries to get back to her but he is repelled by her hidden ability. He promises to keep it a secret and they become friends. Later on, Pong starts to encourage May Nhai to confess her feelings for Fame (Thanapob Leeratanakajorn), the most famous person in school, but she is scared she might electrocute him. Little does she know, Fame secretly likes her as well. He invites her to join track-and-field, in which she agrees to after Pong persuades her. During this time, Pong slowly feels love towards May Nhai, and she starts to become his female protagonist in his stories. Seeing that Fame and May Nhai are getting closer, he is about to give his love up and just continue to support them. However, he decides to change his destiny; so he fights for her. In the end, May Nhai chooses Pong over Fame because he stands by her despite her power.

== Cast and characters ==
=== Main cast ===
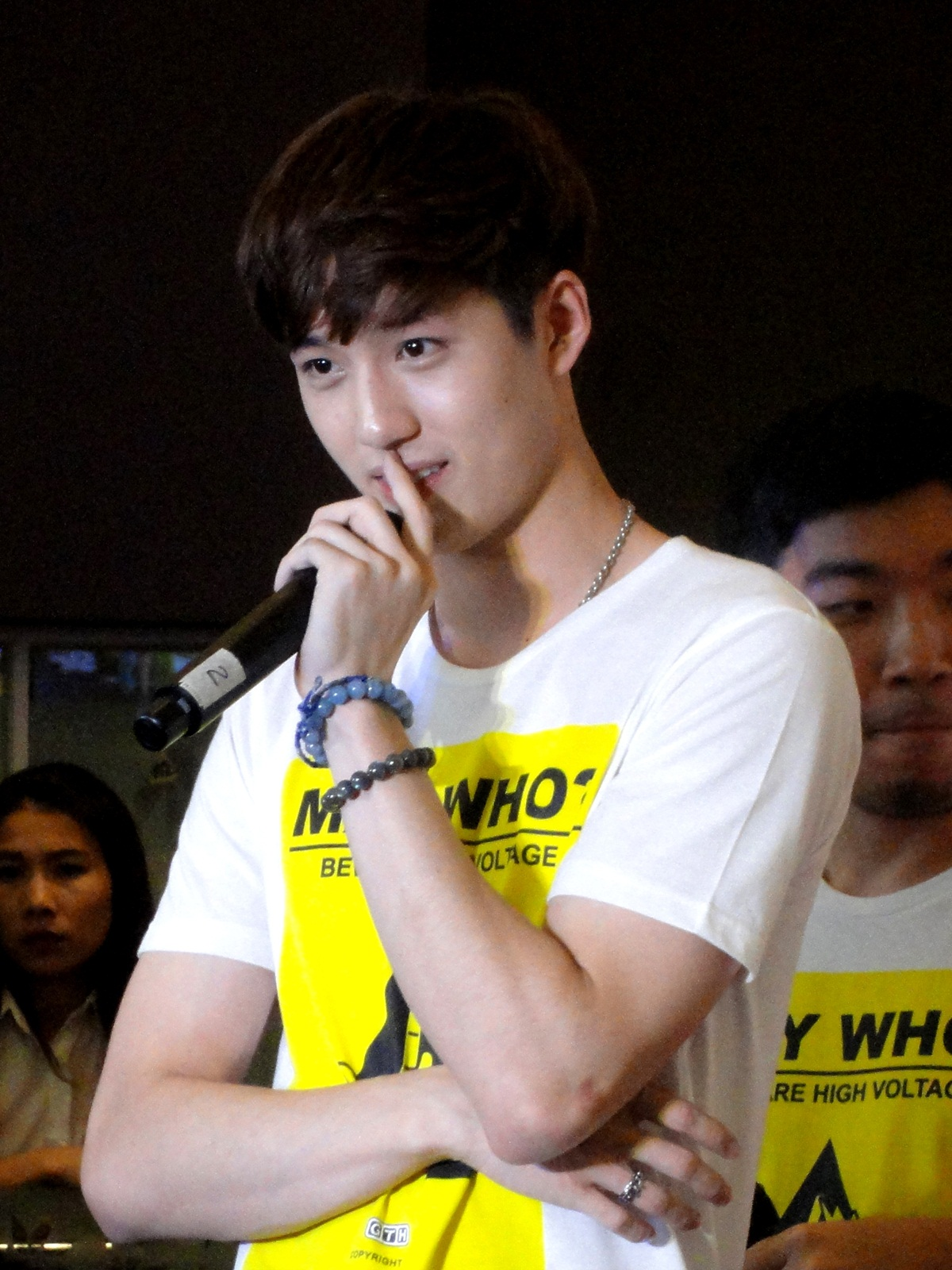
May Who? male protagonists:
Thiti Mahayotaruk (left) and Thanapob Leeratanakajorn (right)
- Sutatta Udomsilp (สุทัตตา อุดมศิลป์) as May Nhai
- Thiti "Bank" Mahayotaruk (ธิติ มหาโยธารักษ์) as Pong
- Thanapob "Tor" Leeratanakajorn (ธนภพ ลีรัตนขจร) as Fame

=== Supporting cast ===
- Narikun Ketprapakorn as Ming
- Kanyawee Songmuang as May (Cheerleader no.6)
- Narupornkamol Chaisang as cheerleader no.5
- Shimara Baren as cheerleader no.4
- Kasira Pornnoppadon as cheerleader no.3
- Punsikorn Tiyakorn as cheerleader no.2
- Nichapat Charurattanawaree as cheerleader no.1
- Saruda Kiatwarawut as Butch May (Mayple)
- Natthayan Ongsritrakul as young May Nhai

== Production ==
The title May Who? is derived from an expression used in Thailand, where 'May' is the most common girl's name. People will say 'May Who?' when they do not know which May is being referred to. The film was supposedly going to be released five months earlier but the 10-minute inclusion of animation in the film caused the delay. It was finally released on October 1, 2015, less than a month after GTH's release of Freelance film.

May Who? is the movie comeback of director Chayanop Boonprakob after the success of his first feature-film SuckSeed in 2011. If SuckSeed was inspired by Boonprakob's love for music, May Who? was inspired by his passion for comics and animation. In fact, the story line of the film was based on Boonprakob's teenage years. He stated: "I kept a diary and also drew comic stories, especially when I had a crush on a girl. At that time I didn't have a camera to take her picture and couldn't look into her life because Facebook didn't exist... This experience of mine became my inspiration in creating the character of Pong." Commenting on how teenagers compare themselves to others because they feel dissatisfied with what they have, he said: "Pong lacks confidence and he is a nobody in school, but he is sensitive to the feelings of others around him. This enables him to draw the little details into his illustrations, and I think this is the charm of Pong." He also adapted Hollywood's superhero image, which suited both the Thai culture and the film budget.

After the success of GTH's Hormones: The Series, Boonprakob have chosen its cast members to play in the film. The director initially thought of Sutatta Udomsilp only, but he ended up recruiting the other alumni as well. He stated: "I did try to cast new actors as I didn't want the series to influence the film too much but ended up casting them as they were all so perfect for my characters... And Thiti is the kind of person who is still happy even when he's being teased." With this, the film marked Thiti Mahayotaruk's film debut, playing the role of Pong who likes to draw. Other than the fact that it was his first film, he was pressured because he needed to show his drawing skills. He commented: "I usually like to draw but I am not very good at it. In order for me to portray my character well, I had to attend drawing workshops." In the end, he thought the making of the film was fun, especially since the crew and his co-actors helped and supported him a great deal.

== Promotion ==
The cast and crew of May Who? visited different places to promote the film in hopes to reach ฿80,000,000 (around $2,241,433) gross. The venues include Siam Paragon shopping mall and CentralWorld shopping plaza. Sutatta Udomsilp was not able to join the promotions due to her suspension following her involvement in an 'untoward subway-dancing incident' in Japan. She was only allowed in October 7, six days after the film's release.

=== Other multimedia ===
May Who? เมย์ไหน ไฟแรงเฟร่อ

Publication information
- Publisher: Siam Inter Comics
- Format: Manga
- Genre: Comedy, Supernatural, Romance
- Publication date: 2015
- No. of issues: 1

Creative team
- Created by: รุจา กลิ่นเกษร, ณัฐพรรณ ส่งไพศาล
- Artist: จีรวัฒน์ บุญห่อ

Collected editions
- 184 pages: ISBN 9786163697691

May Nai Fai Rang Frer comics (เมย์ไหน ไฟแรงเฟร่อ – ฉบับการ์ตูน) is an illustration written by รุจา กลิ่นเกษร and ณัฐพรรณ ส่งไพศาล, and published by Siam Inter Comics with the cooperation of GTH company. The comics, which focuses on stories about the main characters and their personalities, was released prior to the release of the film. According to the director: "The comic is like a prequel of Pong's life".

== Soundtrack ==
The following are tracks used in May Who? film:

- "ไหน ไหน" by แก๊งดาวหกแฉก
- "แค่เธอคนเดียว" by Kornpob Janjarearn (originally "เอกรักจอย" by The Ginkx)
- "ป๋อง" by Thiti Mahayotaruk
- "วิมานดิน" by Nantida Kaewbuasai
- "สบาย สบาย" by Thongchai McIntyre
- "อาบน้ำ" by Thongchai McIntyre
- "เจ้าสาวที่กลัวฝน" by Rewat Buddhinan

== Reception ==
=== Box office ===
The film received positive critical reception and was considered a success in the box office. In its opening weekend, the film grossed $605,708 (฿21,618,627.08). By the end of its run, May Who? grossed approximately $2 million domestically and $197 thousand internationally, totaling approximately $2.2 million worldwide. The cast and crew held a commemoration on October 9 to celebrate its success in the box-office and to thank the fans as well.

=== Critical response ===
The film has a score of 7.79 out of 10 on Siam Zone based on 14 reviews, indicating generally favorable reviews from its viewers. On Sanook!, the film has a score of 3.5 out of 5 rating stating that the comedic timing is on point despite the inconsistency of the actors' expressions. It is also interesting to see the animation with its bright colors in the film, according to Sanook!. However, it is a pity that the film did not show more about the issues concerning high school outcasts in elite schools.

== Accolades ==
Year	Award-Giving Body	Category	Recipient	Result
2015	Daradaily The Great Awards 5	Celebrity Film Actress of the Year	Sutatta Udomsilp	Won
2015	Bioscope Awards 2015	Performance of the Year	Thiti Mahayotaruk	Won
2016	Thailand National Film Association Awards	Best Actor	Thiti "Bank" Mahayotaruk	Nominated
2016	Thailand National Film Association Awards	Best Actress	Sutatta Udomsilp	Nominated
2016	Thailand National Film Association Awards	Best Supporting Actor	Thanapob Leeratanakajorn	Nominated
2016	Thailand National Film Association Awards	Best Supporting Actress	Narikun Ketprapakorn	Nominated
2016	Thailand National Film Association Awards	Best Director	Chayanop Boonprakob	Nominated
2016	Thailand National Film Association Awards	Best Screenplay	Chayanop Boonprakob, Vasudhorn Piyaromna, Nottapon Boonprakob, Thodsapon Thiptinnakorn	Nominated
2016	Thailand National Film Association Awards	Best Art Direction	Arkadech Keawkotr	Nominated
2016	Thailand National Film Association Awards	Best Costume Design	Suthee Muenwaja	Nominated
2016	Thailand National Film Association Awards	Best Sound	Kantana Sound Lab	Nominated
2016	Thailand National Film Association Awards	Best Editing	Panayu Kunvanlee	Nominated
2016	Thailand National Film Association Awards	Best Visual Effects		Nominated
2016	Thailand National Film Association Awards	Best Original Song	"Nhai Nhai"	Nominated
2016	Thailand National Film Association Awards	Best Score	Hualampong Riddim	Nominated
2016	Thai Film Director Association Awards	Best Picture	May Who?	Nominated
2016	Thai Film Director Association Awards	Best Director/Cinematography	Chayanop Boonprakob	Nominated
2016	Thai Film Director Association Awards	Best Female Lead	Sutatta Udomsilp	Won
2016	Thai Film Director Association Awards	Best Supporting Actor	Thanapob Leeratanakajorn	Won
2016	Thai Film Director Association Awards	Best Supporting Actress	Narikun Ketprapakorn	Nominated
2016	Bangkok Critics Assembly Awards	Best Actor	Thiti Mahayotaruk	Nominated
2016	Bangkok Critics Assembly Awards	Best Actress	Sutatta Udomsilp	Nominated
2016	Bangkok Critics Assembly Awards	Best Supporting Actor	Thanapob Leeratanakajorn	Nominated
2016	Bangkok Critics Assembly Awards	Best Supporting Actress	Narikun Ketprapakorn	Nominated
2016	Bangkok Critics Assembly Awards	Best Screenplay	Chayanop Boonprakob, Vasudhorn Piyaromna, Nottapon Boonprakob, Thodsapon Thiptinnakorn	Nominated
2016	Bangkok Critics Assembly Awards	ลำดับภาพยอดเยี่ยม	โดย ปนายุ คุณวัลลี	Nominated
2016	Bangkok Critics Assembly Awards	ดนตรีประกอบยอดเยี่ยม	โดย หัวลำโพงริดดิม และ วิชญ วัฒนศัพท์	Nominated
