= Brother of the Year =

- Directed by: Witthaya Thongyooyong
- Starring: Sunny Suwanmethanont; Urassaya Sperbund; Nichkhun
- Production company: Jor Kwang Films
- Distributed by: GDH 559
- Release date: 2018
- Country: Thailand
- Language: Thai

Brother of the Year (Thai: น้อง.พี่.ที่รัก) is a 2018 Thai romantic comedy film co-written and directed by Witthaya Thongyooyong, produced by Jor Kwang Films, and distributed by GDH 559. The film stars Sunny Suwanmethanont, Urassaya Sperbund, and Nichkhun. The film, which depicts a sibling rivalry, was a commercial hit in Thailand, grossing US$2 million during its four-day opening weekend.

== Cast ==
- Sunny Suwanmethanont as Chut
- Urassaya Sperbund as Jane
  - Achiraya Nitibhon as teenage Jane
- Nichkhun as Moji
- Manasaporn Chanchalerm as Dear
