= O-Negative (TV series) =

- โอเนกาทีฟ รักออกแบบไม่ได้
- Genre: Romantic Drama, Coming-of-Age, Slice of life
- Directed by: Koo Ekkasit Trakulkasemsuk
- Starring: Supassara Thanachart; Thanapob Leeratanakachorn; Jirayu La-ongmanee; Violette Wautier; Arachaporn Pokinpakorn
- Country of origin: Thailand
- Original language: Thai
- No. of seasons: 1
- No. of episodes: 26

Original release
- Release: November 30, 2016 – February 23, 2017

O-Negative (Thai: โอเนกาทีฟ รักออกแบบไม่ได้; RTGS: O-Negative Rak Oak Baep Mai Dai, lit. O-Negative, Love Can't Be Designed) is a 2016 Thai television drama series. It is a television adaptation of the popular 1998 Thai film of the same name. The series aired on GMM 25 and LINE TV from November 30, 2016, to February 23, 2017, consisting of 26 episodes.

== Synopsis ==
The story revolves around a group of five university freshmen who coincidentally all share the rare O-Negative blood type. They form a close-knit friendship as they navigate the challenges and joys of university life, including studies, extracurricular activities, and initial encounters with love and heartbreak. As their relationships deepen, the lines between friendship and romantic love begin to blur, leading to complex emotional entanglements and tests of their bond. The series explores themes of friendship, first love, self-discovery, and the inevitable pains of growing up.

== Cast and characters ==
=== Main ===
- Supassara Thanachart as Foon
- Thanapob Leeratanakachorn (Tor) as Puen
- Jirayu La-ongmanee as Art
- Violette Wautier as Prim
- Arachaporn Pokinpakorn as Chompoo

=== Supporting ===
- Pongpitch Preechaborisuthikul as Go
- Poom Rungsrithananon as Uan
- Yuthana Boonorm (Pa Ted) as Prof. Wichit
- David Asavanond as Prof. Buddy
- Cindy Sirinya Bishop as Duang
- Um Apasiri Nitibhon (Um) as Prim's Mother
- Kajornsak Rattananissai as Prim's Father
- Kanjanaporn Plodpai (Jeab) as Art's Mother
- Supranee Charoenpol (Kai) as Puen's Mother
- Phollawat Manuprasert (Tom) as Puen's Father
- Grace Mahadumrongkul as Foon's Mother
- Sukol Sasijulaka (Jome) as Foon's Father
- Puttachat Pongsuchat (Tui) as Chompoo's Mother
- Paweenut Pangnakorn (Pookie) as Prof. Pat
- Patara Eksangkul (Foei) as Ong-Art
- Noelle Klinneam (Tiny) as Khwan
- Suton Busamsai (Tum) as Nit
- Nitipong Pollachan (Dyu) as Guide
- Apasra Lertprasert (Yoko) as Som-O

== Music ==
The series features a soundtrack that complements its romantic and coming-of-age themes.

- '''Opening Theme:''' "รักออกแบบไม่ได้" (Rak Oak Baep Mai Dai)
- '''Ending Theme:''' "แค่เธอรักฉัน" (Kae Tur Rak Chan - "Just You Love Me") by Bambam Niwirin Limkangwalmongkol (แบมแบม นิวิรินทน์ ลิ่มกังวาฬมงคล)
- '''Original Soundtrack Songs:'''
  - "แค่เธอรักฉัน" (Kae Tur Rak Chan - "Just You Love Me") by Bambam Niwirin Limkangwalmongkol (แบมแบม นิวิรินทน์ ลิ่มกังวาฬมงคล)
  - "รัก..โลกาภิวัตน์" (Rak Loka Pawat - "Love Globalization") by Jirayu La-ongmanee (จิรายุ ละอองมณี) and Sleep Runway.

== Production ==
The drama series is an adaptation of the 1998 Thai film O-Negative, which starred Ray MacDonald, Tata Young, and Shahkrit Yamnarm. The television adaptation was directed by Koo Ekkasit Trakulkasemsuk and produced by GMM 25. It aimed to expand on the original film's narrative and characters, providing a more in-depth exploration of their relationships and individual journeys.

== Reception ==
The series received attention for its portrayal of youthful friendships and romantic dilemmas. The cast, featuring popular young actors, was praised for their performances in bringing the beloved story to a new generation of viewers.
