= Ghost Lab (film) =

2021 Thai film

- Directed by: Paween Purijitpanya
- Written by: Vasudhorn Piyaromna; Paween Purijitpanya; Tossaphon Riantong
- Starring: Thanapob Leeratanakachorn; Paris Intarakomalyasut; Nuttanicha Dungwattanawanich
- Production companies: GDH 559; Jorkwang Film
- Distributed by: Netflix
- Release date: 26 May 2021
- Running time: 117 minutes
- Country: Thailand
- Language: Thai

Ghost Lab is a 2021 Thai film directed by Paween Purijitpanya, written by Vasudhorn Piyaromna, Paween Purijitpanya and Tossaphon Riantong and starring Thanapob Leeratanakachorn, Paris Intarakomalyasut and Nuttanicha Dungwattanawanich. The film, produced by GDH 559, was released as a Netflix original film and received mixed reviews, praising cast performance but criticising the weak storyline and visual effects.

== Plot ==
After witnessing a haunting in their hospital, two doctors become dangerously obsessed with obtaining scientific proof that ghosts exist.

== Cast ==
- Thanapob Leeratanakachorn as Wee
- Paris Intarakomalyasut as Gla
- Nuttanicha Dungwattanawanich as Mai

== Critical response ==
On the review aggregator website Rotten Tomatoes, 29% of 7 critics' reviews are positive, with an average rating of 4.80/10.

Alicia Moore of UK Film Review called it an "enjoyable watch" and said the "plot follows is extraordinary and really makes your head spin with possibilities and explanations that could fit into the film’s universe."
