= Shambhala (2012 film) =

- Film poster
- Directed by: Panjapong Kongkanoy
- Written by: Panjapong Kongkanoy; Nut Nualpang
- Produced by: Tech Akarapol; Sukulya Sucharittanarak
- Starring: Sunny Suwanmethanon; Ananda Everingham; Nalintip Permpattarasakul; Ase Wang
- Cinematography: Nattawut Kittikhun
- Edited by: Saravuth Nakajad
- Production company: Sahamongkol Film International
- Distributed by: Sahamongkol Film International
- Release date: August 23, 2012
- Running time: 113 minutes
- Country: Thailand
- Language: Thai
- Box office: ฿ 18 million

Shambhala (Thai: ชัมบาลา) is a 2012 Thai Drama Romance film directed by Panjapong Kongkanoy. It's the story of estranged brothers and complete opposites, who are thrown together on a spiritual pilgrimage to Tibet. It was released on August 23, 2012. The film stars Sunny Suwanmethanon as Wut and Ananda Everingham as his older brother Tin. The filming of this film was done in Tibet.

== Plot ==
The movie follows brothers Wut (Sunny Suwanmethanon) and Tin (Ananda Everingham) as they set off for Tibet in search of Shambhala, a mythical kingdom in Buddhist tradition, to fulfill the wish of Wut's dying girlfriend, Nam (Nalintip Permpattarasakul). The brothers have a love-hate relationship, but as Wut wants to return to Nam with photographic proof of the trip he begrudgingly accepts Tin's company. As the journey gets more and more intense, the tension grows between the two, especially when a secret involving Tin's ex-girlfriend Jane (Ase Wang) is revealed.

== Cast ==
- Sunny Suwanmethanon as Wut
- Ananda Everingham as Tin
- Nalintip Permpattarasakul as Nam
- Ase Wang as Jane

== Awards and nominations ==
Year	Award	Category	Nominated work	Result
2013	10th Starpics Thai Films Awards	Best Actor	Sunny Suwanmethanon	Nominated
2013	10th Starpics Thai Films Awards	Outstanding Music Composition	Kanit Arrow Studio	Nominated
2013	10th Kom Chad Luek Awards	Popular Movie	Shambhala	Nominated
2013	BK Film Awards	Biggest Letdown	Shambhala	Won
2013	BK Film Awards	Best Original Soundtrack	Pra Yok Bok Lao - Greasy Café	Won
2013	22nd Thailand National Film Association Awards	Best Actor	Sunny Suwanmethanon	Nominated
2013	22nd Thailand National Film Association Awards	Best Supporting Actor	Ananda Everingham	Nominated
2013	22nd Thailand National Film Association Awards	Best Cinematography	Nattawut Kittikhun	Nominated
2013	9th Chalermthai Awards	Actor in Leading Role of the Year	Sunny Suwanmethanon	Nominated
2013	9th Chalermthai Awards	Actor in Supporting Role of the Year	Ananda Everingham	Nominated
2013	9th Chalermthai Awards	Achievement of the Year in Music Written for Motion Picture	Shambhala	Nominated
2013	9th Chalermthai Awards	Song from Film of the Year	Pra Yok Bok Lao - Greasy Café	Nominated
2013	6th Nine Entertain Awards	Film of the Year	Shambhala	Won
2013	6th Nine Entertain Awards	Actor of the Year	Sunny Suwanmethanon	Nominated
2013	21st Bangkok Critics Assembly Awards	Best Leading Actor	Ananda Everingham	Nominated
2013	21st Bangkok Critics Assembly Awards	Best Sound	Kanit Arrow Studio	Nominated
2013	21st Bangkok Critics Assembly Awards	Best Original Song	Pra Yok Bok Lao - Greasy Café	Nominated
2013	29th Saraswati Royal Awards	Best Film	Shambhala	Won
2013	29th Saraswati Royal Awards	Best Director	Panjapong Kongkanoy	Won
2013	29th Saraswati Royal Awards	Best Leading Actor	Sunny Suwanmethanon	Nominated
2013	29th Saraswati Royal Awards	Best Supporting Actor	Ananda Everingham	Nominated
2013	29th Saraswati Royal Awards	Best Cinematography	Nattawut Kittikhun	Nominated
2013	29th Saraswati Royal Awards	Best Sound	Kanit Arrow Studio	Won
2013	29th Saraswati Royal Awards	Best Original Song	Pra Yok Bok Lao - Greasy Café	Nominated
2013	29th Saraswati Royal Awards	Best Special Image Techniques	Zurreal Studio	Nominated
2013	29th Saraswati Royal Awards	Outstanding Young Film Director	Panjapong Kongkanoy	Nominated
2013	Siamdara Stars Awards	Best Film	Shambhala	Nominated
2013	Siamdara Stars Awards	Best Film Director	Panjapong Kongkanoy	Nominated
2013	Siamdara Stars Awards	Best Film Actor	Ananda Everingham	Nominated
