= I Fine..Thank You..Love You =

- Poster
- Directed by: Mez Tharatorn
- Written by: Chaiyapreuk Chalermpornpanich; Benjamaporn Srabua; Mez Tharatorn
- Produced by: Chenchonnee Soonthornsaratul; Suwimon Techasupinan; Jira Maligool; Vanridee Pongsittisak
- Starring: Sunny Suwanmethanon; Preechaya Pongthananikorn
- Cinematography: Kittiwat Saemarat
- Edited by: Thammarat Sumetsupachok; Tanasak Yanjan
- Music by: Vichaya Vatanasapt
- Production company: GTH
- Release date: 10 December 2014
- Running time: 117 minutes
- Country: Thailand
- Language: Thai
- Box office: ฿330.59 million

I Fine..Thank You..Love You is a 2014 Thai romantic comedy film directed by Mez Tharatorn.

== Plot ==
A Japanese girl, Kaya (Sora Aoi), dumps her Thai boyfriend Yim (pronounced "Jim") (Sunny Suwanmethanon), because he cannot speak English and Kaya cannot speak Thai. When Kaya leaves for America, Yim, determined to win Kaya's heart back, he slowly learns English with a renowned English teacher who runs an English tutorial center, Ms. Pleng (Preechaya Pongthananikorn). Unbeknownst to Yim, Ms. Pleng is Kaya's good friend. Can Yim learn English and win back his love?

== Cast ==
- Preechaya Pongthananikorn as Teacher Pleng
- Sunny Suwanmethanon as Jim
- Sora Aoi as Kaya
- Puttachat Pongsuchat as Tui
- Popetorn Soonthornyanakij as Khun Phrik

== Remake ==
An Indonesian remake, titled Love You... Love You Not was released on 13 August 2015.
