= Seven Something =

- Film poster
- Directed by: Jira Maligool; Adisorn Trisirikasem; Paween Purikitpanya
- Screenplay by: Nawapol Thamrongrattanarit; Benjamaporn Srabua
- Story by: Jira Maligool; Adisorn Trisirikasem; Paween Purikitpanya
- Produced by: Jira Maligool; Vanridee Pongsittisak; Chenchonnanee Soonthonsaratul; Suwimol Techasupinan; Yongyoot Thongkongtoon; Visute Poolvoralaks
- Starring: Jirayu La-ongmanee; Sutatta Udomsilp; Sunny Suwanmethanon; Sirin Horwang; Nickhun Horvejkul; Suquan Bulakul; Panissara Phimpru
- Cinematography: Naruphol Chokanapitak
- Edited by: Stéphane Ma; Panayu Khunwallee; Thammarat Sumethsupachok
- Music by: Hualumpong Riddim
- Production companies: Jor Kwang Films; GTH
- Distributed by: GTH (Thailand); Golden Village Pictures (Singapore)
- Release dates: July 26, 2012 (Thailand); September 6, 2012 (Singapore)
- Running time: 147 minutes
- Country: Thailand
- Language: Thai
- Box office: ฿70 million (US$2 million)

Seven Something (Thai: รัก 7 ปี ดี 7 หน; RTGS: Rak Chet Pi Di Chet Hon; lit: "Love 7 Years, Good 7 Times") is a 2012 Thai drama romance anthology film separated into three parts, directed by Jira Maligool, Adisorn Trisirikasem and Paween Purikitpanya. The film commemorates the seven year establishment of GTH. The movie tells various love stories from three generations at different ages: 14, 21 and 42. In the first part, the relationship of a teenage couple is altered by the power of social networking. In the second part, an acting couple's relationship is put to the test as fame takes its toll. In the last episode, a 42-year-old reporter encounters a tragic loss in her life; when she meets a young marathon runner, her life is changed forever. It was released on July 26, 2012. The film stars Jirayu La-ongmanee as Puan, Sutatta Udomsilp as Milk, Sunny Suwanmethanon as John, Sirin Horwang as Mam, Nickhun Horvejkul as He, Suquan Bulakul as She, and Panissara Phimpru as Sairoong.

== Plot summary ==
Seven Something is a love story and was shot by three different directors. As such, the film is divided into three parts; the first is named "14," featuring problems of two teenagers and social networks. The second part is named "21/28" and is about two former actor and actress lovers who work together again after being apart for seven years. The third part is called "42.195" and is about a woman who meets a young man who encourages her to complete a marathon.

Beginning with "14" directed by Paween Purijitpanya (Director of Phobia, Phobia 2), this is the love story of Puan (Jirayu La-ongmanee) and Milk (Sutatta Udomsilp). Their love will never be the same once Puan changes his Facebook's status to "In A Relationship" and starts to incessantly post clips proclaiming his love towards Milk. For Puan, each and every moment and emotion for Milk is conveyed with each upload. There are so many comments from nosy people that the total views reach almost viral levels. Puan becomes very obsessed with this online world filled with strangers and as a result his girlfriend's love for him fades with every "Like" click on his Facebook's wall.

Next is "21/28" directed by Adisorn Tresirikasem (Director of BTS - Bangkok Traffic Love Story) - a story of how two former superstars who starred in a critically acclaimed film together deals with their emotions as their careers go downhill experiencing failure in finances and fame. All they have to hold on to is their one-hit-wonder movie. Now, the actress Mam (Sirin Horwang), who is 28 years old, is struggling to get back in front of the camera again. The chance arrives when the studio announces plans to make a sequel to their hit movie. Both Mam and John (Sunny Suwanmethanon) will get a chance to be stars on the big screen again. However, John has long left the movie scene becoming a caretaker of aquatic animals in an aquarium. Mam will have to make her way to find John, who was once handsome, but is now a vulgar overweight man who drinks a lot of beer.

And the last story is "42.195" by award-winning director Jira Maligool (Director of Mekhong Full Moon Party and The Tin Mine) which conceptualizes the parallels of life and running a marathon. The human life's mileage is not much different from the kilometer sign that shows the distance of the marathon. The story is about SHE (Suquan Bulakul) a 42 years old newsreader whose life changes and transitions to a whole new chapter once she meets He (Nickhun Horvejkul), a young marathon runner who invites her to join the Bangkok Marathon race. Her life will never be the same again.

== Cast ==
- Jirayu La-ongmanee as Puan
- Sutatta Udomsilp as Milk
- Sunny Suwanmethanon as John
- Sirin Horwang as Mam
- Nickhun Horvejkul as He
- Suquan Bulakul as She
- Panissara Phimpru as Sairoong
- Preechaya Pongthananikorn as Herself (cameo)
- Pattarasaya Kreuasuwansiri as Herself (cameo)
- Nuengthida Sophon as Herself (cameo)
- Arak Amornsupasiri as Pae (Man on the phone)

== Awards and nominations ==
Year	Award	Category	Nominated work	Result
2013	10th Starpics Thai Films Awards	Best Supporting Actress	Suquan Bulakul	Nominated
2013	10th Starpics Thai Films Awards	Popular Thailand Film	Seven Something	Won
2013	Top Awards	Best Film	Seven Something	Nominated
2013	Top Awards	Best Film Director	Jira Maligool, Adisorn Trisirikasem, Paween Purikitpanya	Nominated
2013	Top Awards	Best Film Actor	Sunny Suwanmethanon	Nominated
2013	Top Awards	Best Film Actress	Sirin Horwang	Nominated
2013	Top Awards	Best Rising Film Actor	Nickhun Horvejkul	Nominated
2013	10th Kom Chad Luek Awards	Best Actor	Jirayu La-ongmanee	Nominated
2013	10th Kom Chad Luek Awards	Popular Movie	Seven Something	Nominated
2013	BK Film Awards	The Eye Candy Award	Nickhun Horvejkul	Won
2013	22nd Thailand National Film Association Awards	Best Actress	Suquan Bulakul	Nominated
2013	9th Chalermthai Awards	Film of the Year	Seven Something	Nominated
2013	9th Chalermthai Awards	Director of the Year	Jira Maligool	Nominated
2013	9th Chalermthai Awards	Actor in Leading Role of the Year	Sunny Suwanmethanon	Won
2013	9th Chalermthai Awards	Actress in Leading Role of the Year	Suquan Bulakul	Nominated
2013	9th Chalermthai Awards	Actress in Supporting Role of the Year	Sirin Horwang	Won
2013	9th Chalermthai Awards	Screenplay of the Year	Nawapol Thamrongrattanarit	Nominated
2013	9th Chalermthai Awards	Achievement of the Year in Music Written for Motion Picture	Seven Something	Nominated
2013	9th Chalermthai Awards	Song from Film of the Year	Yark Ruk Tong Mai Klua Kum Wa Sia Jai - Da of Endorphine	Nominated
2013	6th Nine Entertain Awards	Actor of the Year	Sunny Suwanmethanon	Nominated
2013	6th Nine Entertain Awards	Popular Award	Nickhun Horvejkul	Nominated
2013	21st Bangkok Critics Assembly Awards	Best Leading Actress	Suquan Bulakul	Nominated
2013	29th Saraswati Royal Awards	Best Leading Actress	Suquan Bulakul	Nominated
2013	29th Saraswati Royal Awards	Best Supporting Actor	Jirayu La-ongmanee	Won
2013	Siamdara Stars Awards	Best Film Actress	Suquan Bulakul	Nominated
2013	Siamdara Stars Awards	Best Film Actress	Sirin Horwang	Nominated
