= Nichkhun =

Thai American singer (born 1988)

- นิชคุณ
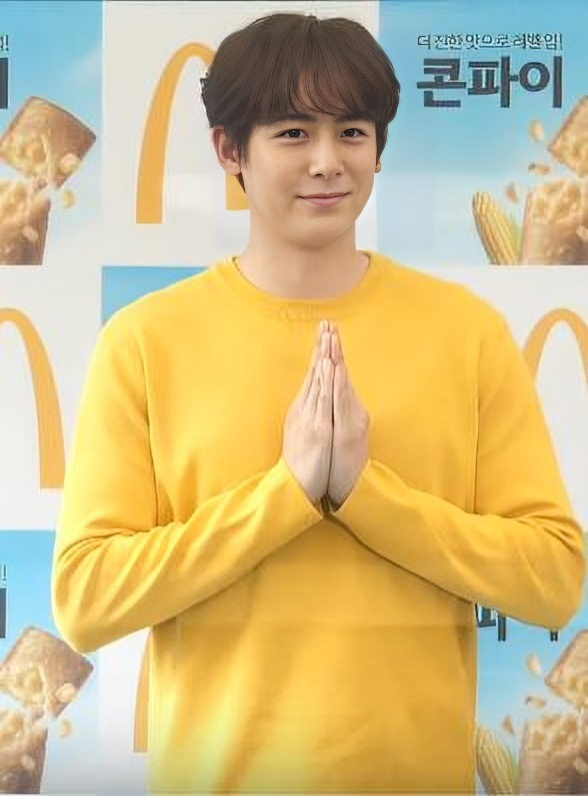
- Nichkhun in 2019
- Born: Nichkhun Buck Horvejkul; June 24, 1988 (age 38); Rancho Cucamonga, California, U.S.
- Occupations: Singer-songwriter; rapper; actor
- Musical career
- Genres: K-pop; J-pop; hip-hop; EDM; R&B
- Instrument: Vocals
- Years active: 2008–present
- Label: JYP
- Member of: 2PM; JYP Nation
- Website: 2pm.jype.com

Signature
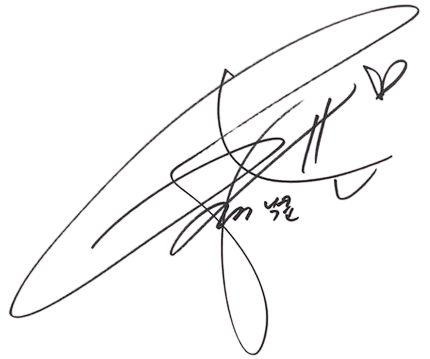

Nichkhun Buck Horvejkul (Note: Thai: นิชคุณ หรเวชกุล; RTGS: Nitchakhun Horawetchakun) (born June 24, 1988), better known mononymously as Nichkhun (Korean: 닉쿤 (Note: Within the Korean entertainment industry and in Korean-language printed media, his name is rendered as "Nick-kun" in Hangeul due to a misspelling by a staff member when he joined JYP Entertainment. In Thai, the ch in his name is pronounced as [tʃ] (as in "cheese"). He later stated in an interview that he never corrected the error after realizing that Koreans found it easier to pronounce "Nick-kun" and viewed it as a nickname.)), is a Thai and American singer-songwriter, rapper, and actor. Based in South Korea as a member of the South Korean boy band 2PM, Nichkhun is the first Southeast Asian individual to debut in a K-pop idol group.

As a solo artist, Nichkhun has released two EPs. As an actor, he has starred in various Korean, Thai, and Chinese dramas and films such as Seven Something (2012), One and a Half Summer (2014), and Brother of the Year (2018). He has also worked as a television personality on several variety and reality programs such as We Got Married, We K-Pop, and Idol on Quiz.

== Early life and family ==
Born in Rancho Cucamonga, California, U.S. to a Thai father and a Thai Chinese-American mother, Nichkhun is a dual national of Thailand and the United States. His maternal grandparents emigrated to Thailand from Hainan, and he has said that he has extended family and distant ancestors from Guangzhou. His mother, Yenjit Horvejkul (née Mekworewut), is the chief executive officer of her family's pharmaceutical business, Union Medical, which imports pharmaceutical products from abroad and is a major government contractor. His wealthy background and physical attractiveness as a kkonminam earned him the nickname "Thai Prince" in South Korea. The second of four children, Nichkhun has an older brother Nichan Bert (born September 11, 1986, California, USA), and two younger sisters, Nichthima Yanin (born July 22, 1990, California, USA) and Nachjaree (Cherreen) (born October 20, 1994, Bangkok, Thailand).

In order to let their children understand their own culture and learn the language, the family decided to move back to Thailand and resided in the Bangkok suburbs where Nichkhun and his siblings attended neighborhood Thai-medium schools rather than international schools. He had no inclination towards the performing arts as a child and was a competitive badminton player. At the age of twelve, he boarded at Whanganui Collegiate School in New Zealand for a year and a half, before returning to Rancho Cucamonga. He attended Etiwanda High School before transferring to Los Osos High School.

Nichkhun was scouted by a scout manager of JYP Entertainment at the Los Angeles Korean Music Festival as a high school senior and offered a trainee contract, despite having no background in singing or dancing. In 2006, he moved to South Korea for training.

== Career ==
=== Pre-debut ===
While still a trainee, Nichkhun was first introduced to South Korean television through a guest appearance in JYP Entertainment's 2006 audition program Superstar Survival in an episode filmed in Thailand. The following year, he made his debut in Thailand using his nickname "Khun", appearing as a backup dancer in a milk advertisement with Rain, who had become immensely popular in Southeast Asia due to the drama Full House.

In July 2008, Nichkhun became one of the panelists in the second season of popular talk show-cum-variety program Ya Shim Man Man 2 alongside industry veterans such as Kang Ho-dong. He eventually left the program in November, having made his debut with 2PM several months prior.

=== 2PM ===
In 2008, he participated in Mnet's Hot Blooded Men, a program that chronicles the rigorous training of thirteen aspiring trainees, all vying for a coveted spot in the boy band One Day. This initiative ultimately led to the formation of two distinct boy bands, namely 2AM and 2PM.

Half a year following the televised airing of Hot Blooded Men, the group 2PM made their debut with the release of their inaugural single "10 Out of 10" from their first single album titled Hottest Time of the Day. However, it was their second single album, 2:00PM Time For Change, that propelled them to mainstream success in Korean music, solidifying their meteoric rise. As of 2021, the group has released seven studio albums in Korea and five studio albums in Japan. Nichkhun has also participated in activities of the unofficial 2PM sub-unit ENWJ with Jun. K and Wooyoung, holding events and concerts with the group since 2023.

=== Solo activities ===
==== 2010–2016: Variety shows, hosting, and first acting roles ====
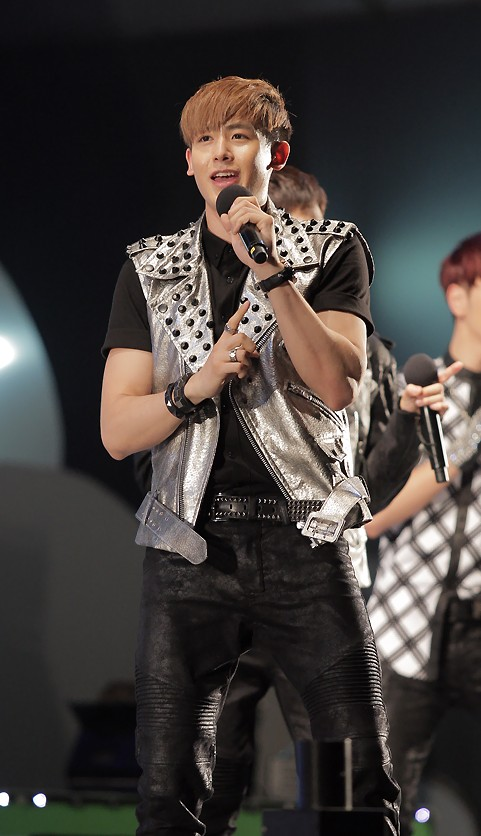
Nichkhun in July 2011

In June 2010, Nichkhun was cast in the second season of MBC's variety show We Got Married, pairing up with Victoria of f(x). The couple, known as Khuntoria, was featured on the show for fifteen months and won the Popularity Award at the 2010 MBC Entertainment Awards before leaving during the third season in September 2011.

Nichkhun was a co-host for MBC Korean Music Wave in Bangkok in 2011, 2012, and 2013. On January 31, 2011, Nichkhun appeared in the music video of the single "Touch" (觸動) by Taiwanese-American Mandopop artist Will Pan. On March 17, 2012, Nichkhun made his Japanese acting debut in the live-adaptation film of Ouran High School Host Club as Lawrence, the president of a Singaporean corporation. Also in 2012, Nichkhun made his Thai acting debut in the anthology film Seven Something and took on the role of a young marathon runner. The romantic anthology film was produced by Thailand's film studio and distributor GMM Tai Hub and released on July 26, 2012.

In 2013, it was reported that he had been cast as a lead character in the Chinese television series One and a Half Summer, a role which required him to speak both Mandarin and English. The series aired between June and July 2014 on Dragon Television, becoming one of the most streamed dramas of the year despite receiving sluggish television ratings.

In 2014, Japanese network NTV's Kindaichi Shounen no Jikenbo mystery drama special was broadcast on January 4. Nichkhun took on the role of a young student who was involved in a serial murder case set in the jungles of Malaysia. Nichkhun started filming for his Chinese drama Looking for Aurora in June. In August, Nichkhun also debuted as a designer and released bag collection in collaboration with Korean fashion brand Rosa.K. The "Rosa.K x Nichkhun Collaboration" consisted of three different lines, Dustin, Lawnick, and Dave, and the showcase was held on August 26, 2014. Nichkhun teamed up with CNBLUE's Jung Yong-hwa, B1A4's Baro, Infinite's L, and Winner's Mino to form the project group Lucky Boys (Super 5) for the 2014 SBS Gayo Daejeon; the group were also co-hosts of the show with actress Song Ji-hyo.

In 2015, Nichkhun made cameo appearances in the Chinese movie Forever Young, starring Li Yi Feng and Zhang Hui We, and the Thai movie Touch the Sky – Chalui, which he also contributed to the soundtrack of. Also in 2015, Nichkhun was cast as a mentor on a Chinese music reality show Youth Trainee on Zhejiang Television.

In 2016, Nichkhun and actor Lee Jung-jin released a travel essay and photobook called Journey, Map that Embraces the Wind (여행, 바람을 품은 지도) on May 3. The photos in the book were taken during their trip to Hawaii, USA.

==== 2017–2020: Further acting and variety show roles, debut as soloist ====
In 2017, 2PM held their final concerts prior to their hiatus due to mandatory military enlistment, and Nichkhun began focusing more on solo activities. He starred in his first Korean-language role, playing a doctor on JTBC's web series Magic School. In September, Nichkhun announced his first solo Asia fan meeting tour. His fan meeting series, Khunvitation, was held in Tokyo on November 29–30, in Seoul on December 3, in Osaka on December 13–14, and in Bangkok on March 3, 2018. He held a solo Chinese fan meeting tour titled Ni+Khun with dates in Beijing and Nanjing.

Also in 2018, he portrayed the half-Japanese, half-Thai boyfriend of Urassaya Sperbund's character in Brother of the Year, which ranked first in Thai box offices and became the second highest-grossing domestically-produced movie of the year. On December 27, 2018, Nichkhun's Chinese web drama Shall We Fall in Love (勇往直前恋上你) premiered on Tencent Video.

Nichkhun traveled to work in several countries in 2018, especially to shoot for travel and food programs, including JTBC and ONE31's The Team Chef and JTBC's Let's Eat Dinner Together in South Korea, tvN's Galileo: Awakened Universe in the United States, tvN Asia's One Night Food Trip – International Edition 2 in the Philippines, tvN Asia's Wok The World in Singapore, and the Tourism Authority of Thailand's Experience Thailand and More in Thailand, Myanmar, and Indonesia. In addition, from 2018 to 2019, he appeared as a panelist on The Mask Line Thai, the sixth season of the Thai show The Mask Singer.

Nichkhun held his first solo concert Home in Osaka on November 23–24 and in Tokyo from December 20–22. On December 19, 2018, Nichkhun released his debut solo mini album Me in Japan, having composed all of the songs in the album. On February 18, 2019, Nichkhun released his solo album Me in South Korea. The album was available for streaming in South Korea, China, and Thailand. A special song called "Umbrella" dedicated to his fans was released in five different languages: Japanese, Korean, Mandarin, Thai, and English. Nichkhun brought his Home concert series to Seoul on May 11–12, his first solo concerts in South Korea. On June 27–28, he also held encore concerts in Tokyo titled "Home" Encore in Japan ~Sweet 624~. On July 27, Nichkhun held his first solo concert in Thailand, Home in Bangkok.

On October 28, 2019, Nichkhun announced the release of his second mini album in Japan titled Story of... and his solo concerts of the same name. On December 19, his album Story of... was released digitally simultaneously in Japan and Korea. The physical format of the album was released on December 25. Nichkhun held his Story of... concerts on December 26–27, 2019 in Osaka and on January 6–7, 2020 in Tokyo.

In 2019, Nichkhun was a co-host of the music variety program We K-Pop. In 2020, Nichkhun became a fixed member of the variety show Idol on Quiz as part of the senior idols team. Also in 2020, Nichkhun joined the Thai audition program The Brothers' School of Gentlemen as a mentor along with Jesdaporn Pholdee, Ananda Everingham and Mario Maurer. However, in the midst of filming, he was forced to return to South Korea as the COVID-19 pandemic worsened in Thailand. The participants selected from the program eventually debuted in 2022 as T-pop boy group Proxie.

On May 22, 2020, his Thai romantic comedy My Bubble Tea began airing on Viu and starred Phiravich Attachitsataporn and Manasaporn Chanchalerm. The Viu Original drama revolves around Chanchalerm's character who concocts a special tea so that she can make her boss (played by Nichkhun) fall in love with her. The highly-rated drama won several awards at the 2020 Asian Academy Creative Awards, including a Best Supporting Actor (Thailand) for his role. On September 21, Nichkhun and Day6's Jae Park voiced the roles of the fictional crime-fighting boyband 4 2 Sing for an episode of the third season of Big Hero 6: The Series. On October 25, Nichkhun and 2019 Miss Korea Kim Sae-yeon hosted the Asia Contents Awards & Global OTT Awards.

==== 2021–present: Hollywood debut ====
In 2021, Nichkhun and Hwang Chan-sung made special cameo appearances in Vincenzo to support their bandmate Ok Taec-yeon. He also featured in the single "How Cute Is This?" (น่ารักอะไรเบอร์นี้) by Thai pop star Saksit Vejsupaporn, his first time rapping in Thai, but he was unable to participate in the music video as tightened COVID-related restrictions prevented him from returning to Thailand. From 2021 to 2022, Nichkhun appeared on the second season of the Chinese survival show Shine! Super Brothers as one of twenty-one contestants.

In 2022, CJ Major Entertainment's horror movie Cracked starring Nichkhun released after repeated delays in production due to the COVID-19 pandemic. In an interview with magazine Prestige Hong Kong, he stated he chose the role in order to break out of being type-cast. Nichkhun then starred in the Viu Thailand original series Finding the Rainbow as one of three protagonists, alongside Sushar Manaying and Itthipat Thanit. His role as Thai-American businessman Wilson won critical acclaim and he was nominated for the Best Supporting Actor Award at the 2023 Asia Contents Awards & Global OTT Awards.

Nichkhun starred in the Hollywood film The Modelizer, a romantic comedy directed by Keoni Waxman, alongside Byron Mann, Rayssa Bratillieri, Dominika Kachlik, and Kenneth Tsang. It was filmed on location in Hong Kong. Originally titled Hong Kong Love Story, it was renamed The Modelizer and released through Vertical Entertainment on July 14, 2023.

On December 30, 2023, Nichkhun held a fan meeting in Bangkok titled Nichkhun Fan Meeting in Bangkok "Happy Khun Year". On April 27, 2024, Nichkhun held his first fan meeting in Jakarta titled No.624: Nichkhun Fan Meeting in Jakarta. In 2025, Nichkhun appeared on the Thai variety show School Lunch Attack: It's MEP Time! as the leader of the cast.

== Other activities ==
Despite being mostly based in South Korea, Nichkhun has continued to support various charitable causes in Thailand. He was appointed "Friend of UNICEF" on April 9, 2013 and participated in fundraising campaigns and field visits. In 2015, he was awarded a recognition plaque from UNICEF Thailand for his work.

== Impact and public image ==
Nichkhun is the first Southeast Asian individual to debut in a K-pop idol group. Prior to his debut, the "foreigners" in the industry were predominantly either of partial Korean parentage or ethnic Koreans from the North American or Japanese diasporas. He is often mentioned as a pioneer within the K-pop industry, as his popularity in South Korea further contributed to the Korean Wave (Hallyu) in Thailand, which was still an emerging market for K-pop at the time of his debut. Following his debut and success, more Thai individuals began to debut in K-pop groups, such as Got7's BamBam and Blackpink's Lisa.

During his pre-debut appearances in Superstar Survival and Hot Blooded Men, Nichkhun initially gained attention from viewers for his looks. In an unprecedented move, he was cast as a panelist in the SBS talk show-cum-variety program Ya Shim Man Man 2 despite being a foreigner with a limited command of the Korean language and an idol trainee who had yet to debut; after the first episode aired, he ranked first in the Naver online search rankings, with an opinion-editorial in The Hankyoreh noting that he "rose to stardom without saying a single word". Domestic pop culture commentators noted that his popularity with Korean viewers led to increased awareness of long-held xenophobic attitudes towards Southeast Asia that has been engrained in the domestic entertainment industry, particularly after he was confronted with indirect derogatory remarks related to his Thai nationality on several television programs he appeared on.

His public profile as a member of 2PM has made him one of the most recognizable faces in the Korean entertainment industry who hail from Southeast Asia. Early into his career, he became one of the top celebrity advertising models in South Korea in terms of number of commercial films. In 2012, he was awarded the Kerd of the Year, which recognizes the most popular and influential Thai celebrities chosen by host Woody Milintachinda and voted by the Thai public.

He has been cited multiple times by South Korean and Thai government officials in diplomatic talks and was appointed the Goodwill Ambassador for the 2018 Thai Festival held in Seoul to celebrate 60 years of formal diplomatic relations between both countries. Due to his fluency in English besides Korean and Thai, he has featured in tourism campaigns and presented travel documentaries sponsored by the Tourism Authority of Thailand.

== Personal life ==
=== Military exemption ===
As a male citizen of Thailand, he was subject to the military draft lottery in April 2009, but subsequently received an exemption from military service as his home district had met the required quota.

=== Sports ===
An avid sportsman, Nichkhun was previously a competitive badminton player during his schooling years and continues to play amateurly. His appearances on Our Neighborhood Arts and Physical Education in the badminton series of episodes alongside the likes of retired legends Lee Dong-soo and Ha Tae-kwon led Yonex Korea to appoint him as its brand ambassador in 2014, the first non-professional athlete to be chosen.

Nichkhun has also been cast in various Korean golfing variety shows, starting with the Netflix program Birdie Boys in 2022. In 2024, he was a cast member in the golfing show To Die For. In 2025, he returned for the second season of To Die For, this time accompanied by his bandmate Hwang Chan-sung.

=== DUI incident ===
On July 24, 2012, Nichkhun was involved in a vehicular collision with a motorcyclist in Gangnam. It was reported that the singer had been driving under the influence of alcohol when he crashed into a motorcycle. His BAC measured at 0.056%, thus his license was suspended. Nichkhun personally apologized for the incident, resulting in him taking a hiatus from the entertainment industry.

== Discography ==
=== Extended plays ===
Title	Album details	Peak chart positions			Sales
Title	Album details	KOR	JPN	JPN Hot	Sales
Me	Released: December 19, 2018 (JPN), February 18, 2019 (KOR); Label: JYP Entertainment; Formats: CD, digital download	14	9	10	KOR: 4,352; JPN: 12,631
Story Of...	Released: December 25, 2019 (JPN); Label: Epic JYP; Formats: CD, digital download	—	19	16	
"—" denotes releases that did not chart or were not released in that region.

=== Promotional songs ===
- 2008: "We Become One" (for Wall's Cornetto Thailand)
- 2009: "Let's Take a Break" (for Tourism Authority of Thailand)
- 2009: "Cute" (for Suzuki Jelato)
- 2012: "Win the Day" (with Team SIII; for Samsung Galaxy S III and 2012 Summer Olympics)

=== Soundtrack appearances ===
- 2011: "My Valentine" (with J.Y. Park & Taecyeon), Dream High OST
- 2012: "Let It Rain", One and a Half Summer OST
- 2015: "Wan Nun Wan Nee Wan Nhai" (วันนั้น วันนี้ วันไหน) (featuring Taecyeon), Touch the Sky – Chalui OST
- 2018: "Fall in Love With You" (勇往直前恋上你), Shall We Fall in Love? OST

=== Collaborations ===
Year	Artist	Title	Album
2010	JYP Nation	"This Christmas"	Non-album single
2011	Taecyeon & Nichkhun (feat. Park Jin-young)	"My Valentine"	Dream High OST
2013	SBS Gayo Daejeon Friendship Project	"You Are A Miracle"	Non-album single
2015	Nichkhun feat. Taecyeon	"Wan Nun Wan Nee Wan Nhai" (วันนั้น วันนี้ วันไหน)	Touch the Sky – Chalui OST
2016	JYP Nation	"Encore"	Non-album single
2021	Tor Saksit feat. Nichkhun	"How Can You Be This Lovely?" (น่ารักอะไรเบอร์นี้)	Non-album single
2021	Cast of Shine! Super Brothers Season 2	"The Second Light" (第二道光)	Non-album single
2022	Nichkhun & Yaochen	"Christmas Snow" (白色信封)	Non-album single
2023	Nichkhun & Yaochen	"Christmas Snow" (English ver.)	Non-album single

=== Compositions ===
All credits are adapted from Korea Music Copyright Association (KMCA) database.

Year	Title	Artist	Album	Notes
2013	"Let It Rain"	2PM	Grown (Grand Edition)	Lyrics and music
2014	"Love Is True"	Nichkhun & Junho	Go Crazy! (Grand Edition)	Lyrics
2018	"Home"	Nichkhun	Me	Lyrics and music
2018	"Lucky Charm" (Korean & English versions)	Nichkhun	Me	Lyrics and music
2018	"Bridge"	Nichkhun	Me	Lyrics and music
2018	"Jealous"	Nichkhun	Me	Lyrics and music
2018	"Mars"	Nichkhun	Me	Lyrics and music
2018	"Colorful Xmas"	Nichkhun	Me	Lyrics and music
2018	"Endearing"	Nichkhun	Me	Lyrics and music
2018	"Umbrella" (Korean, English & Japanese versions)	Nichkhun	Me	Lyrics and music
2019	"Story Of..." (English & Japanese versions)	Nichkhun	Story Of...	Lyrics
2019	"You" (English & Japanese versions)	Nichkhun	Story Of...	Lyrics and music
2019	"Vanilla"	Nichkhun	Story Of...	Lyrics and music

== Filmography ==
=== Television and web series ===
Year	Title	Role	Notes	Ref.
2010	More Charming by the Day	Nichkhun	Cameo (Episode 76)	
2010	All My Love for You	Ok Yub's human substitute	Cameo (Episode 1)	
2011	Dream High	Ri-ah's CF partner	Cameo (Episode 8)	
2011	Welcome to the Show	Himself	Pilot	
2014	One and a Half Summer	Zhang Hao	Chinese drama	
2014	Kindaichi Shounen no Jikenbo	Ma Taichi	Japanese TV movie special	
2015	Looking for Aurora	Wang Yilin	Chinese drama	
2015	Yes Sir My Boss	Piak	Thai drama; cameo (Episodes 7–8)	
2015	The Producers	Himself	Cameo (Episode 3)	
2017	Magic School	Joon	JTBC's web drama	
2018	Shall We Fall in Love	Jiang Yinan	Tencent's Chinese web drama	
2019	Thong Ek: The Herbal Master	Hyung Suk	Thai drama; cameo (Episodes 12, 14)	
2019	Arthdal Chronicles	Rottip	Cameo (Episodes 10–12, 14)	
2020	My Bubble Tea	Boss	Viu's Thai Original Series	
2020	Big Hero 6: The Series	Dae and Hyun-ki (voice)	Guest (Season 3 Episode 6 "Big Hero Battle"); with Jae Park	
2021	Vincenzo	Actor	Cameo (Episode 12); with Hwang Chan-sung	
2022	Finding the Rainbow	Wilson	Viu's Thai Original Series	

=== Films ===
Year	Title	Role	Notes	Ref.
2012	Ouran High School Host Club	Lawrence	Japanese film	
2012	Seven Something	He	Thai film	
2014	A Dynamite Family	Policeman	Korean film; cameo	
2015	Touch the Sky – Chalui	Himself	Thai film; cameo	
2015	Forever Young	Photographer	Chinese film; cameo	
2018	Brother of the Year	Moji	Thai film	
2022	Cracked	Tim	Thai film	
2023	The Modelizer	Bucky	American film	

=== Variety shows ===
==== Korean variety shows ====
Year	Title	Role	Notes	Ref.
2008	Ya Shim Man Man (Season 2)	Main cast	Episodes 1–17	
2008–2013	Star King	Panelist	Episodes 85, 87, 93–130, 133, 135, 137, 166–168, 173, 188–190, 202, 223–224, 232, 236	
2009	Good Body, Bad Body, Weird Body (Body, Body, Body)	Main cast	Part of MBC's Sunday Sunday Night	
2010–2011	We Got Married (Seasons 2 & 3)	Main cast	Episodes 52–115; with Victoria Song	
2012	KOICA's Dream in Tanzania	Main cast	with Ok Taec-yeon	
2017	Experience the Real Thailand	Host	with Jun. K	
2018	The Team Chef	Main cast		
2018	Galileo: Awakened Universe	Main cast		
2018	One Night Food Trip – International Edition 2 in the Philippines	Main cast		
2018	Wok the World	Main cast		
2019	Nemo Travel: A Trip to the Maldives	Main cast	with Hwang Chan-sung and Jung Gun-joo	
2019	We K-Pop	Host		
2020	Idol on Quiz	Senior-dol Team	Episodes 7–20	
2022–2023	Birdie Boys	Main cast		
2023	K-Pop Generation	Interviewee	with Jun. K, Jang Wooyoung, and Hwang Chan-sung	
2023–2024	Star Eat Show 2	Main cast		
2024	To Die For	Main cast		
2025	To Die For Season 2	Main cast		

==== Chinese variety shows ====
Year	Title	Network	Notes	Ref.
2014	Perhaps Love (Season 1)	Hubei TV	Guest appearance (Episode 1)	
2014	Youku All Star Show	Youku	Guest appearance	
2014	Goddess & Man	Youku	Cameo appearance	
2014	Happy Camp	Hunan TV	Guest appearance; with Jang Wooyoung	
2014	Tonight 80's Show	Dragon TV	Guest appearance; with Wei Daxun	
2014	Brave Heart	BTV	Mentor; with Godfrey Gao, Jiang Wu and Zhang Lanxin	
2014	Dream Music Charity Event	CGV		
2015	Youth Trainee	Zhejiang Television	Mentor; with Jiro Wang, Shang Wenjie and Li Quan	
2015	Korea-China Dream Team	Shenzhen TV	Guest appearance (Episodes 1, 9)	
2015	Let's Go Together	Hubei TV	Guest appearance (Episode 1)	
2016	Grade One: Freshman	Hunan TV	Guest appearance (Episode 12)	
2016	Beat the Champions	Zhejiang Television	Guest appearance (Episode 4)	
2016	The Strongest Girl Group	Tencent Video	Guest appearance (Episode 12)	
2021–2022	Shine! Super Brothers 2	Youku	Contestant	

==== Thai variety shows ====
Year	Title	Network	Notes	Ref.
2018	Experience Thailand and More	YouTube	with Nachjaree (Chereen) Horvejkul	
2018–2019	The Mask Line Thai	Workpoint TV	Panelist	
2020	The Brothers' School of Gentlemen	Channel 3	Mentor	
2025	School Lunch Attack: It's MEP Time!	Workpoint TV		

=== Hosting ===
Year	Title	Notes	Ref.
2010	M Countdown	Rotating host; with Lee Jun-ho, Hwang Chan-sung, Jo Kwon, Jeong Jin-woon, Kang Min-hyuk, Lee Joon, and G.O	
2011	MBC Korean Music Wave in Bangkok	with Tiffany Young and Kwon Yu-ri	
2011	MBC Gayo Daejejeon	with Victoria Song, Jo Kwon, Gain, Leeteuk, Kang So-ra, Hahm Eun-jung, and Lee Jang-woo	
2012	MBC Korean Music Wave in Bangkok	with Tiffany Young and Taeyeon	
2013	MBC Korean Music Wave in Bangkok	with Choi Min-ho, Jo Kwon, Park Ji-yeon, and Bae Suzy	
2014	SBS Gayo Daejeon	with Jung Yong-hwa, Baro, L, Mino, and Song Ji-hyo	
2018	KCON Thailand	with Minnie and BamBam	
2019	KCON Thailand	with BamBam	
2020	Asia Contents Awards & Global OTT Awards	with Kim Sae-yeon	
2023	37th Golden Disc Awards	with Sung Si-kyung, Park So-dam and Lee Da-hee	

== Concerts and fan meetings ==
=== 1st Asia Fan Meeting Tour "Khunvitation" ===
Date	City	Country	Venue	Ref.
November 29, 2017	Tokyo	Japan	Tokyo Dome City Hall	
November 30, 2017	Tokyo	Japan	Tokyo Dome City Hall	
December 3, 2017	Seoul	South Korea	Yeongdeungpo Art Hall	
December 13, 2017	Osaka	Japan	Orix Theater	
December 14, 2017	Osaka	Japan	Orix Theater	
March 3, 2018	Bangkok	Thailand	MCC Hall The Mall Bangkapi	

=== Fan Meeting Tour "Ni+Khun" ===
Date	City	Country	Venue	Ref.
October 13, 2018	Beijing	China	Beijing Exhibition Center	
November 17, 2018	Nanjing	China	Nanjing Olympic Sports Center Gymnasium	

=== Premium Solo Concert Series "Home" & Encore in Japan ~Sweet 624~ ===
Date	City	Country	Venue	Ref.
November 23, 2018	Osaka	Japan	Orix Theater	
November 24, 2018	Osaka	Japan	Orix Theater	
December 20, 2018	Tokyo	Japan	Nakano Sunplaza	
December 21, 2018	Tokyo	Japan	Nakano Sunplaza	
December 22, 2018	Tokyo	Japan	Nakano Sunplaza	
May 11, 2019	Seoul	South Korea	Ewha Women's University (ECC Samsung Hall)	
May 12, 2019	Seoul	South Korea	Ewha Women's University (ECC Samsung Hall)	
June 27, 2019	Tokyo	Japan	Tokyo Dome City Hall	
June 28, 2019	Tokyo	Japan	Tokyo Dome City Hall	
July 27, 2019	Bangkok	Thailand	Central Chaengwattana Hall	

=== Premium Solo Concert 2019–2020 "Story of..." ===
Date	City	Country	Venue	Ref.
December 26, 2019	Osaka	Japan	Zepp Osaka Bayside	
December 27, 2019	Osaka	Japan	Zepp Osaka Bayside	
January 6, 2020	Tokyo	Japan	Nakano Sunplaza	
January 7, 2020	Tokyo	Japan	Nakano Sunplaza	

=== Solo Fan Meetings ===
Date	Title	City	Country	Venue	Ref.
December 24, 2018	Nichkhun (From 2PM) Colorful X'mas Party with "Me"	Tokyo	Japan	Orix Theater	
December 30, 2023	Nichkhun Fan Meeting in Bangkok "Happy Khun Year"	Bangkok	Thailand	MGI Hall	
April 27, 2024	No.624: Nichkhun Fan Meeting in Jakarta	Jakarta	Indonesia	Balai Sarbini	

== Awards and nominations ==
Year	Award	Category	Recipient / Nominated work	Result	Ref.
2009	Mnet 20's Choice Awards	Hot Mr. Beauty Award	Himself	Won	
2009	Tourism Authority of Thailand	PR Ambassador	Himself	Won	
2010	Nine Entertain Awards (Thailand)	Popular Vote	Himself	Nominated	
2010	MBC Entertainment Awards	Popularity Award	Himself (with Victoria Song); We Got Married	Won	
2010	Korea Jewelry Awards	Diamond Award (with Chansung)	Himself	Won	
2011	3rd Bugs Music Awards	OST of the Year (with Taecyeon)	"My Valentine"	Won	
2011	KBS Best Idol Icon Awards	Icon of the Year	Himself	Nominated	
2011	Mnet Media Awards	Most CHARMING Boy	Himself	Won	
2011	MTV K's very first Valentine King and Queen	Valentine King	Himself	Won	
2011	TVCF Awards	Most Popular CF Star	Himself	Nominated	
2012	Kerd Awards	Kerd of the Year	Himself	Won	
2012	TVCF Awards	CF Model of The Year	Himself	Nominated	
2012	Top Award (Thailand)	Best Rising Film Actor	Seven Something	Nominated	
2012	BK Film Awards	The Eye Candy Award	Seven Something	Won	
2012	6th Nine Entertain Awards (Thailand)	Popular Award	Seven Something	Nominated	
2013	Stylebible.ph	International Celebrity Collab	Himself (with Bench)	Nominated	
2013	Nine Entertain Awards	Popular Award	Himself	Nominated	
2013	Singapore Blog Awards	Most Popular Overseas Celebrity	Himself	Nominated	
2013	The Goodness Idol Thailand Awards	The 9 Idols for The King	Himself	Won	
2014	—N/a	Asian's Male God	Himself	Nominated	
2015	Microblogging Star 2014 (China)	Weibo Star	Himself	Nominated	
2015	K-pop Gaon Chart Award	Social Star	Himself	Nominated	
2015	—N/a	Asian's Male God	Himself	Nominated	
2015	Micro-star Magazine (Chinese)	Star Scoreboard in February (Overseas)	Himself	Nominated	
2015	UNICEF Thailand Award	Friend of UNICEF	Himself	Won	
2015	Zocial Awards 2015 (Thailand)	Thailand Twitter Ranking	Himself	Rank #1	
2015	Zocial Awards 2015 (Thailand)	Most Mentioned in Thailand on Twitter	Himself	Rank #2	
2016	IME Chinese Online Media Popular Award	Thailand Headlines Person of the Year Awards	Himself	Won	
2016	China Weibo Awards	Male God of the Year	Himself	Won	
2016	VDFLY	Top Ten Handsome Asian Men	Himself	Nominated	
2016	Trends Health's Healthy Role Model Awards	Most Influential Healthy Role Model Award	Himself	Won	
2017	Big Ben Award	Global Ten Outstanding Chinese Young Elites	Himself	Won	
2017	Fengdu Men's Uno Young Anniversary	International Artist Award	Himself	Won	
2018	Chic Style Award 2018	Popular Artist of the Year Award	Himself	Won	
2018	Tomorrow Land Fashion Award 2018	International Fashion Charity Artist of the Year Award	Himself	Won	
2018	2018 FEIA Awards Ceremony	International Artist of the Year Award	Himself	Won	
2018	Thailand Headlines Person of The Year 2018 Award	Asia Superstar Award	Himself	Won	
2018	Recognition Award	Goodwill Ambassador of the 60th Anniversary of Thailand-Republic of Korea Diplomatic Relations	Himself	Won	
2019	2019 FEIA Awards	Influential Asian Idol of the Year Award	Himself	Won	
2019	27th Bangkok Critics Assembly 2018 Award	Best Supporting Actor	Brother of the Year	Nominated	
2019	Thai Film Director Award 2019	Best Supporting Actor	Brother of the Year	Nominated	
2019	2019 Weibo Starlight Awards	Asia's Star Award	Himself	Won	
2019	2019 China Fashion Awards	Asia's Most Influential Idol Award	Himself	Won	
2020	Asian Academy Creative Awards 2020	Best Actor in a Supporting Role (Thailand)	My Bubble Tea	Won	
2020	Tatler Asia's Gen. T List 2020	Asia's ‘Leaders of Tomorrow’	Himself	Won	
2021	2021 Weibo Starlight Awards	Starlight Artist Award	Himself	Won	
2021	2021 IFENG Fashion Choice Awards	Asian Idol of the Year Award	Himself	Won	
2023	Asia Contents Awards & Global OTT Awards	Best Supporting Actor	Finding the Rainbow	Nominated	
