= Sunny Suwanmethanont =

Thai actor and model (born 1981)

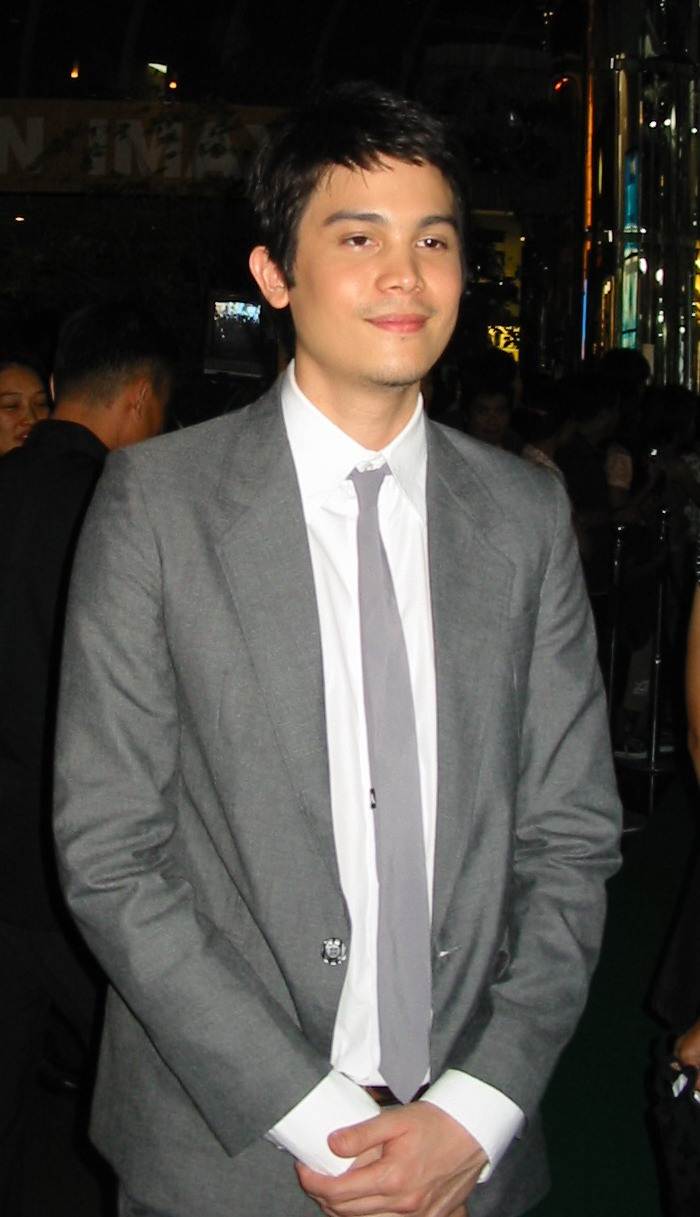
- Sunny in 2008
- Born: Sunny C. Suwanmethanont; 18 May 1981 (age 45); Thailand
- Education: Assumption University
- Occupation: Actor
- Years active: 2005–present
- Agent: Nadao Bangkok

Sunny Suwanmethanont (Thai: ซันนี่ สุวรรณเมธานนท์, RTGS: Sanni Suwanmethanon; born 18 May 1981) is a Thai actor. He is best known for his role as Khaiyoi in the 2005 film Dear Dakanda, for which he won the Best Actor award at Kom Chad Luek Awards. He is also known for his roles in I Fine..Thank You..Love You (2014), Heart Attack (2015), Brother of the Year (2018) and Happy Old Year (2019).

== Early life and education ==
He was born in Thailand, to a Thai Singaporean father and a French mother and has an older brother and an older sister. Sunny attended Surasakmontree School in Bangkok from standard 1 until 6 and graduated from Assumption University, majoring in Communication Arts. He is an atheist.

== Filmography ==
=== Film ===
Year	Title	Thai Title	Role	Notes
2005	Dear Dakanda	เพื่อนสนิท	Khaiyoi	
2007	The Bedside Detective	สายลับจับบ้านเล็ก	Jawk	
2009	Bangkok Traffic Love Story	รถไฟฟ้า มาหานะเธอ	TV series hero	Cameo
2012	7 Something	รัก 7 ปี ดี 7 หน	John	"21/28" Episode
2012	Shambala	ชัมบาลา	Wut	
2014	I Fine..Thank You..Love You	ไอฟาย..แต๊งกิ้ว..เลิฟยู้	Yim	
2015	Heart Attack	ห้ามป่วย ห้ามพัก ห้ามรักหมอ	Yoon	
2016	A Gift	พรจากฟ้า	Aey	"Still on My Mind" Episode
2017	Mr. Hurt	มิสเตอร์เฮิร์ท มือวางอันดับเจ็บ	Don	
2017	Die Tomorrow	ดายทูมอร์โรว์	a young man	"A PASSPORT" Episode
2018	Brother of the Year	น้อง.พี่.ที่รัก	Chut	
2019	Happy Old Year	ฮาวทูทิ้ง ทิ้งอย่างไรไม่ให้เหลือเธอ	Aim	
2023	Long, Live, Love	ลอง ลีฟ เลิฟว์!	Sati	
2023	The Adventures	The Adventures ผจญภัยล่าขุมทรัพย์หมื่นลี้	Ricky	Thai Chinese prime video film

=== Television ===
Year	Title	Thai Title	Role	Network	Notes
2008	True Love Next Door Season 1	นื้อคู่ประตูถัดไป	Joe	Channel 9	
2010	True Love Next Door Season 2	เนื้อคู่อยากรู้ว่าใคร	Joe	Channel 5	
2013	Carabao The Series: Mind Sea	คาราบาว เดอะซีรี่ส์: ทะเลใจ	Rita	Channel 9	
2014	True Love Next Door Season 3	เนื้อคู่	Joe	GMM 25	
2015	Stay	ซากะ..ฉันจะคิดถึงเธอ	Mhee	Line TV	
2017	Stupid Cupid	น้ำตากามเทพ	Chawee Amaraporn	GMM 25	
2019	Answer For Heaven	คำตอบสำหรับสวรรค์	Angel ‘Thep’	One31	
2019	My Ambulance	รักฉุดใจนายฉุกเฉิน	Dr. Peng	One31	

== Awards and nominations ==
Year	Award	Category	Nominated work	Result
2006	15th Suphannahong National Film Awards	Best Actor	Dear Dakanda	Nominated
2006	3rd Kom Chad Luek Awards	Best Actor	Dear Dakanda	Won
2006	3rd Chalermthai Awards	Actor in Leading Role of the Year	Dear Dakanda	Won
2008	5th Chalermthai Awards	Actor in Leading Role of the Year	The Bedside Detective	Nominated
2010	9th Hamburger Awards	Favourite Scene-Stealer Actor	Bangkok Traffic Love Story	Nominated
2013	10th Starpics Thai Films Awards	Best Actor	Shambala	Nominated
2013	12th Top Awards	Best Film Actor	7 Something	Nominated
2013	22nd Suphannahong National Film Awards	Best Actor	Shambala	Nominated
2013	9th Chalermthai Awards	Actor in Leading Role of the Year	Shambala	Nominated
2013	9th Chalermthai Awards	Actor in Leading Role of the Year	7 Something	Won
2013	6th Nine Entertain Awards	Actor of the Year	Shambala, 7 Something	Nominated
2013	Saraswati Royal Awards	Best Leading Actor	Shambala	Nominated
2015	4th Daradaily The Great Awards	Best Film Actor	I Fine..Thank You..Love You	Nominated
2015	24th Suphannahong National Film Awards	Best Actor	I Fine..Thank You..Love You	Nominated
2015	23rd Bangkok Critics Assembly Awards	Best Actor	I Fine..Thank You..Love You	Nominated
2015	5th Thai Film Directors Association Awards	Best Actor	I Fine..Thank You..Love You	Nominated
2015	Kazz Awards	Popular Song - ABC (with Preechaya Pongthananikorn)	I Fine..Thank You..Love You	Nominated
2015	Saraswati Royal Awards	Best Leading Actor	I Fine..Thank You..Love You	Won
2015	Saraswati Royal Awards	Popular Male Actor	I Fine..Thank You..Love You	Nominated
2015	Siam Dara Star Awards	Best Film Actor	I Fine..Thank You..Love You	Won
2015	Siam Dara Star Awards	Most Popular Male Star	—N/a	Nominated
2015	Maya Channel Awards	Best Actor (Movie)	I Fine..Thank You..Love You	Nominated
2015	Maya Channel Awards	Best Pop Song - ABC (with Preechaya Pongthananikorn)	I Fine..Thank You..Love You	Nominated
2015	14th Hamburger Icon Awards	This Is It Award	—N/a	Won
2015	Seventeen Choice Awards	Seventeen Choice Actor	—N/a	Won
2015	10th OK! Awards	Female Heartthrob	—N/a	Nominated
2015	13th Starpics Thai Films Awards	Best Actor	Heart Attack	Won
2016	24th Bangkok Critics Assembly Awards	Best Actor	Heart Attack	Won
2016	5th Daradaily The Great Awards	Best Film Actor	Heart Attack	Won
2016	25nd Suphannahong National Film Awards	Best Actor	Heart Attack	Won
2016	13th Kom Chad Luek Awards	Best Actor	Heart Attack	Won
2016	6th Thai Film Directors Association Awards	Best Actor	Heart Attack	Won
2018	27th Suphannahong National Film Awards	Best Actor	Mr.Hurt	Nominated
2018	27th Suphannahong National Film Awards	Best Supporting Actor	Die Tomorrow	Nominated
2018	8th Thai Film Directors Association Awards	Best Supporting Actor	Die Tomorrow	Nominated
2018	8th Thai Film Directors Association Awards	Best Actor	Mr.Hurt	Nominated
2018	26th Bangkok Critics Assembly Awards	Best Actor	Mr.Hurt	Nominated
2018	15th Starpics Thai Films Awards	Best Actor	Mr.Hurt	Nominated
2018	Saraswati Royal Awards	Best Actor	Mr.Hurt	Nominated
2018	Siam Dara Star Awards	Best Film Actor	Brother of the Year	Won
2019	28th Suphannahong National Film Awards	Best Actor	Brother of the Year	Nominated
2019	27th Bangkok Critics Assembly Awards	Best Actor	Brother of the Year	Nominated
2019	15th Kom Chad Luek Awards	Best Actor	Brother of the Year	Nominated
2019	9th Thai Film Directors Association Awards	Best Actor	Brother of the Year	Nominated
2020	29th Suphannahong National Film Awards	Best Actor	Happy Old Year	Nominated
2020	10th Thai Film Directors Association Awards	Best Supporting Actor	Happy Old Year	Nominated
2020	28th Bangkok Critics Assembly Awards	Best Supporting Actor	Happy Old Year	Nominated
2020	17th Starpics Thai Films Awards	Best Supporting Actor	Happy Old Year	Nominated
2020	16th Kom Chad Luek Awards	Best Supporting Actor	Happy Old Year	Nominated

== Advertisement ==
- Est Cola
- TCB Tuna
- Chang Beer
- KTC I-Cash
- AIS Mobile Life
- Hanami Snack
- Colgate
- Yamaha Fino
- Sansiri Townhouse
