= Ladda Land =

- Theatrical release poster
- Directed by: Sophon Sakdaphisit
- Written by: Sopana Chaowwiwatkul; Sophon Sakdaphisit
- Produced by: Jira Maligool; Chenchonnee Soonthornsarakul; Suvimon Techasupinum; Vanridee Pongsittisak
- Starring: Saharat Sangkapreecha; Piyathida Woramusik; Atipich Chutiwatkajornchai; Sutatta Udomsilp
- Cinematography: Kittiwat Semarat
- Edited by: Thammarat Sumethsupachok
- Music by: Hualampong Riddim; Vichaya Vatanasapt
- Production companies: GTH; Jorkwang Films
- Release date: April 28, 2011 (Thailand)
- Running time: 113 minutes
- Country: Thailand
- Language: Thai
- Box office: $5,750,036

Ladda Land (Thai: ลัดดาแลนด์) is a 2011 Thai supernatural horror film directed and co-written by Sophon Sakdaphisit. The film is based on a story about a family who moves into a new house where they gradually begin to encounter paranormal events. The film was very successful in Thailand where it was the number one film in the country on its opening week. The film later had its international premiere at the 17th Busan International Film Festival. The film won six awards at the Thailand National Film Association Awards.

== Plot ==
Thee, a struggling 40-year-old marketing officer, moves from Bangkok to Laddaland, an upmarket housing estate in Chiang Mai, bringing along his wife Parn, his rebellious teenage daughter Nan, and lively young son Nat. Thee is certain that the move is the best solution to all the financial problems of his company, which sells dietary supplements. Parn is concerned about the hefty mortgage payments for their new house.

Thee also hopes to mend his relationship with Nan, who is resentful of her parents due to spending much of her life with her maternal grandmother per an agreement between Thee and Parn's mother — Nan was born out of wedlock when her parents were still in high school, and Parn's mother, who has never accepted Parn's relationship with Thee, demands Nan in return for their continued relationship. Nan is unimpressed despite Thee's best efforts to make good of the situation, and wishes to return to her grandmother.

While Laddaland appears to be a relatively ordinary if quiet neighborhood, Thee and his family realize that something is wrong with the environment, since the place seems to sow discord among the households to commit violence. A Burmese housemaid is found dead in a grisly murder. Somkiat, Thee's next-door neighbor, regularly beats his wife and son while mistreating his elderly mother; the family eventually perishes when Somkiat commits murder suicide, with his son's death being the most horrific as he disfigures his face by vertically cutting it. Meanwhile, Nan experiences supernatural phenomena when she is swayed by her friends to visit the house where the Burmese maid was killed. Thee's refusal to believe Nan causes her to move to her boarding school until the end of the term.

Thee and Parn eventually succumb to the discord. Thee discovers that his boss is committing fraud and forcing him to work in odd jobs. Parn also faces the stress of Nan's absence and her own supernatural encounters. Nat is the only one who remains unaffected by the environment and seems happy to live in Laddaland. However, Parn feels worried when she learns that Nat has started an imaginary friendship with Somkiat's deceased son.

The dysfunction reaches its nadir when Nan, on the day of her return from boarding school, is haunted by the spirit of Somkiat's wife and mother next door and has to stay at a mental hospital so she can be calmed down. Parn lashes out at Thee and says that she and the children will move back to Bangkok to join her mother. Thee discovers that Nat is missing that night and searches Somkiat's house, where he is haunted by the spirit of Somkiat's son. He is followed by Parn, who finds him shooting at a wardrobe, where Nat is hiding while playing hide-and-seek with the ghost of Somkiat's son. Nat survives the shot, but Thee, thinking that he has killed his son, commits suicide.

Parn drives her children back to Bangkok after the tragedy. She recounts to Nan how she became accustomed to Thee, how she lost her dreams when she discovered her pregnancy, and how in spite of everything, Thee always tries to do his best and love his family. The film ends with flashbacks showing Thee and his family in happier times.

== Cast ==
- Saharat Sangkapreecha as Thi
- Piyathida Woramusik as Parn
- Sutatta Udomsilp as Nan
- Deuntem Salitul as Parn's mother
- Sahajak Boonthanakit as Somkiat
- Paramej Noiam as Manop
- Apasra Lertprasert as Nan (10 years old)

== Release ==
Ladda Land was released in Thailand on April 28, 2011. The film received an international premiere at the 17th Busan International Film Festival on October 11, 2011.

Laddaland was a big hit in Thailand where it premiered at number one in its first week, beating out the American film Thor. The film was shown for six weeks in Thailand where it grossed a total of $3,877,740. The Hollywood Reporter suggested in their review that the film was such a big hit in Thailand due to circumstances in the film being based on an actual condo development in Chiang Mai that is rumoured to be haunted.

== Reception ==
Variety gave the Laddaland as positive review referring to it as "tasty T-horror" and that it was a "well-made chiller is ideal for fest sidebars, and should reap strong worldwide ancillary." The Hollywood Reporter gave a positive review, referring to the film as "sleekly designed" but that "some of the CGI are rough round the edges". The reviewer felt that Laddaland was also inferior compared to the Thai horror films Shutter (2004) and Alone (2007). Film Business Asia echoed The Hollywood Reporter's sentiments gave the film the a 6 out of 10 rating, and stating that it was a "technically effective horror movie" but one that "leaves the audience short-changed on a story level."

Laddaland won six awards at the Thailand National Film Association Awards. These awards included Best Film, Best Actress (Piyathida Woramusik), Best Supporting Actress (Sutatta Udomsilp), Best Screenplay (Sopana Chaowwiwatkul and Sophon Sakdaphisit), Best Editing (Nagamon Boonrod, Phuriphan Phuphaibun, Thammarat Sumetsupachok) and best make-up (Pichet Wongjansom).
