= Praput Pimpama =

Thai guitarist, singer and songwriter

Praput Pimpama โอปอ ประพุทธ์
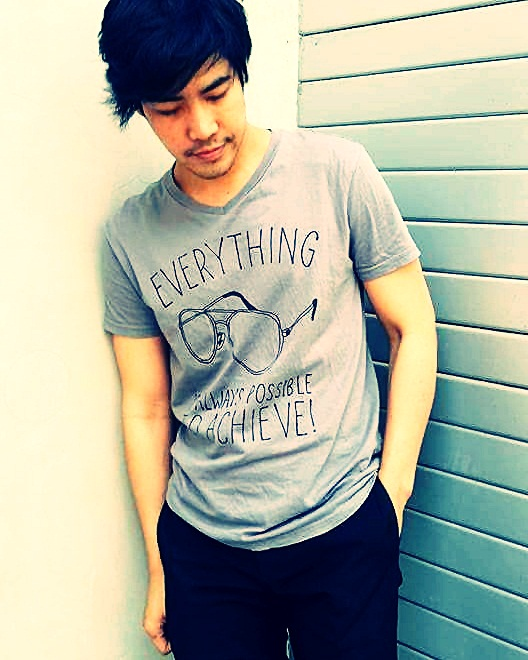

Background information
- Also known as: Opor Praput
- Born: Praput Pimpama; (Thai: ประพุทธ์ พิมพามา); 25 August 1987 (age 38); Loei, Thailand
- Genres: Pop
- Occupations: Guitarist; singer; songwriter
- Years active: 2013–present
- Label: Whattheduck

Opor Praput (Thai: โอปอ ประพุทธ์) or Praput Pimpama (Thai: ประพุทธ์ พิมพามา) is a Thai guitarist, singer and songwriter. He is known as one of The Voice Thailand Season 2 competitors.

== Early life ==
He was born on 28 August 1987 and raised in Loei, Thailand. He is the only child in a family and grew up with parents’ 1970s music, inspiring him to learn singing and playing guitar. After his secondary school, Opor Praput moved to Bangkok to further his education and became a musician with his own band.

The genre of music he loves is the modern pop with singers such as John Mayer, Jamie Cullum, Joe Satriani, Mr. Big and Thai-band Silly Fools.

== The Voice Thailand ==
He competed on The Voice Thailand Season 2 in 2013 from September to November.

Stage	Song	Original Artist	Date	Result
Blind Audition	Took Sing (ทุกสิ่ง)	Krissada Sukosol Clapp	15 September 2013	Two Chairs Turned. Joined Team Kong
Battle Rounds	Yoo Tor Loei Dai Mai (อยู่ต่อเลยได้ไหม)	Singto Numchok	27 October 2013	Saved by Coach
Knock Out Rounds	I won't give up	Jason Mraz	24 November 2013	End of Competition

== Career ==
Year	Song	Released	
2014	Khon Ti Fang Jai (คนที่ฝังใจ)	15 April 2014	drama soundtrack Ost. Fai Rak Plueng Khaen (ไฟรักเพลิงแค้น)
	Good Night	9 October 2014	first single under Whattheduck music company
2015	Uk Ak (อึกอัก)	3 June 2015	second single under Whattheduck music company
	Hetphon-Khong-Khon-Mai-Di (เหตุผลของคนไม่ดี)	8 October 2015	drama soundtrack Ost.Huachai Ni Phuea Thoe (สองหัวใจนี้เพื่อเธอ)
2016	Perd (เปิด)	15 January 2016	demo version for Cleo Thailand's short film, "The 50 Last Dates"
	Mai-Tong-Khitthueng (ไม่ต้องคิดถึง)	8 April 2016	third drama soundtrack Ost. Butsaba Re Fan (บุษบาเร่ฝัน)
	Dee-Jai-Jang (ดีใจจัง)	31 May 2016	advertisement soundtrack
	Khae Rao Mi Kan Khae Chan Mi Thoe (แค่เรามีกันแค่ฉันมีเธอ)	15 September 2016	drama soundtrack Ost. Duangchai Phisut (ดวงใจพิสุทธิ์)
	Ya Mong Chan Pen Khon Uen Dai Mai (อย่ามองฉันเป็นคนอื่นได้ไหม)	1 December 2016	drama soundtrack Ost. Khon La Khop Fa (คนละขอบฟ้า)

== Others ==
- Voted as The Online's Heartthrob Bachelor by The Klinique for Cleo 50 Most Eligible Bachelors 2015
- Actor for the first short film of Cleo Thailand magazine "The 50 Last Dates"
- DJ at 88.5 E-D-S Everyday Station from Monday to Friday at 08.00–10.00 hrs.
