= Khunnaphon Udomsin =

Thai footballer

Personal information
- Birth name: Rawee Udomsin
- Date of birth: 27 February 1997 (age 29)
- Place of birth: Thailand
- Height: 1.87 m (6 ft 1 1/2 in)
- Position: Forward

Team information
- Current team: Angthong
- Number: 19

Senior career*
Years	Team	Apps	(Gls)
2018	Samutsongkhram		
2019–2021	PT Prachuap	2	(0)
2020	→ Samutsongkhram (loan)	14	(0)
2021–2022	Krabi	6	(0)
2022	Young Singh Hatyai United	4	(0)
2023–	Angthong	16	(0)
- * Club domestic league appearances and goals as of 7 April 2024

Khunnaphon Udomsin (Thai: คุณพล อุดมศิลป์, born February 27, 1997) or formerly Rawee Udomsin (Thai: ระวี อุดมศิลป์) is a Thai professional footballer who plays as a forward.
