= Stupid Cupid The Series =

2015 Thai comedy television drama series

Stupid Cupid The Series (Numtha Kummathep) (Thai: น้ำตากามเทพ) is a 2015 Thai comedy television drama series, starring Sunny Suwanmethanon, Ungsumalynn Sirapatsakmetha, Chomchay Chadwilay, Mayurin Pongpudpunth, Pawenuch Paengnakhon, Apitsada kruakongka, Kornpob Janjaroen, Preechayee Pongtananikron and Boriboon Junreung.The series follows sarcasm of normally Thai drama series (Soap operas).This series used to appear for supporting some parts of Thai film “Bangkok Traffic Love Story”, then the director decided to create Stupid Cupid to the real series.

== Plot ==
The Amaraporn family is a big and wealthy family. On the 80th birthday of Grandmother (Chomchay Chadwilay), who is a head of the family announced that she wants to hold an arranged marriage between Chawee (Sunny Suwanmethanon) and Araya (Ungsumalynn Sirapatsakmetha). Chawee, the only grandson of the Amaraporn family, dislikes Araya since they were young. Araya is an orphan that Grandmother adopted. Yingmae (Mayurin Pongpudpunth) and Chonlee (Pawenuch Paengnakhon) wants to eliminate Araya because she will soon become the daughter-in-law and receive the inheritance from grandmother instead of them. They plan to use Didi (Apitsada Kruakongka), Chawee's lover, who came back from the UK to change his mind and cancel the wedding. Doctor (Kornpob Janjaroen) who looks after the Amaraporn family secretly loves Araya. Although Araya is slandered by Chawee, Yingmae, Chonlee and Didi, she gets the encouragement from Doctor.

Meanwhile, Pyload (Preechayee Pongtananikron), a woman who disguises herself as a man, applies to be the new gardener, however she comes to the castle because she has some secret hidden that no one knows. Furthermore, Pisan (Boriboon Junreung), the mysterious man living on the desert island, is planning to avenge somebody in the Amaraporn family. The jumbling story has begun from these queer character.
