= Sutatta Udomsilp =

Thai actress (born 1997)

- สุทัตตา อุดมศิลป์
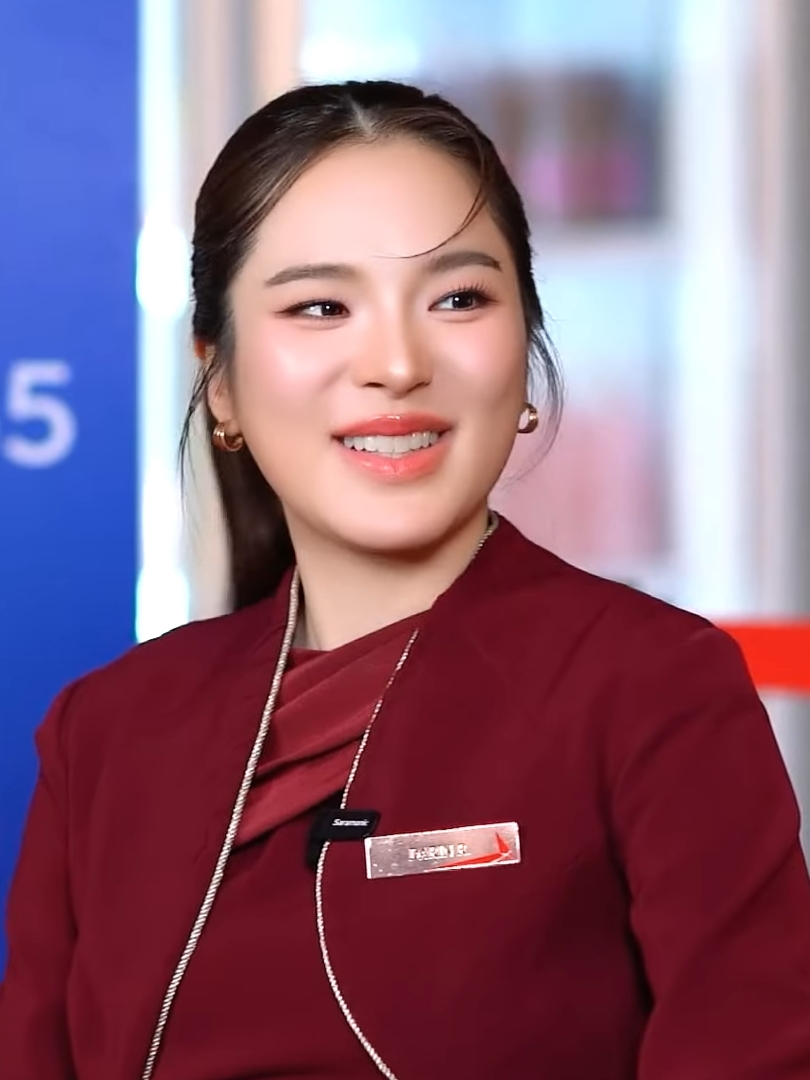
- Born: 5 June 1997 (age 29); Bangkok, Thailand
- Other name: Punpun
- Education: Chulalongkorn University; Faculty of Communication Arts
- Occupation: Actress
- Years active: 2007–present
- Agents: Nadao Bangkok (2011–2016); Freelance Actress (2017–present)
- Known for: Ladda Land
- Height: 1.6 m (5 ft 3 in)

Sutatta Udomsilp (Thai: สุทัตตา อุดมศิลป์; nicknamed PunPun (Thai: ปันปัน), born 5 June 1997) is a Thai actress. She is best known for her roles in Last Summer, May Who?, and Hormones: The Series.

== Early life and education ==
Sutatta was born on June 5, 1997, in Bangkok, Thailand. She went to Kasetsart University Laboratory School and Ruamrudee International School before completing her bachelor's degree from the Faculty of Communication Arts at Chulalongkorn University and completed her master's degree in Master of Science (Anti-Aging and Regenerative Medicine) form College of Integrative Medicine Dhurakij Pundit University.

She is the youngest of the three siblings. She has an older brother and an older sister.

== Career ==
Sutatta entered the entertainment industry at the age of 4 as an advertising model for several commercials. She marked her acting debut with Ladda Land. She went on to become as one of the main actors in the 2012 film Seven Something.

Sutatta was a Suphannahong Award winner for her leading role in Last Summer and a nominee for the "Best Actress in a Leading Role" in the 2019 Asian TV Awards for her role in Bangkok Love Stories: Plead.

== Filmography ==
=== Film ===
Year	Title	Role	Notes
2007	Body Sop 19	Medical Student(childhood)	
2011	Ladda Land	Nan	
2012	Seven Something	Milk	
2013	Last Summer	Meen	
2015	May Who?	May Nai	
2021	The Whole Truth	Pim	
2022	Faces of Anne	Anne	

=== Television series ===
Year	Series	Role	Notes
2008	Rhythm Love	Pop	Guest
2013-2015	Hormones: The Series	Thaneeda "Toei" Kamolpaisarn	Season 1-2 (Main) Season 3 (Guest)
2014	ThirTEEN Terrors	Im	Main
2016	U-Prince: The Gentle Vet	Suaysai	Main
2016-2017	I Hate You, I Love You	Nana	Main
2017	Secret Seven	Padlom	Main
2018	Roop Thong	Riawkhao / Khaow	Main
2019	Wolf	Mo	Main
2019	Hoh Family	Lin Zhi	Main
2019	Bangkok Love Stories 2: Plead	Elle	Main
2019	The Stranded		Guest
2019-2020	One Night Steal	Je	Main
2020	Gentlemen at the End of the Alley(sitcom)	Dao	Guest
2021	Gentlemen at the End of the Alley(sitcom)	Dao	Guest
2021	Club Friday 12 Uncharted Love : The Snatch of Love	Namwan	Main
2021	Drama for All: Criminal People 5G	Lin	Main
2022	Gentlemen at the End of the Alley(sitcom)	Dao	Guest
2022	Club Sapan Fine 2 Class Si Fine : Proverbs for Women	Oil	Main
2022	The Three GentleBros	Nueng	Main
2023	Gentlemen at the End of the Alley(sitcom)	Dao	Guest
2023	The Jungle	Pladao	Main
2023	One Night Stand	Papang	Main
2024	Gentlemen at the End of the Alley(sitcom)	Dao	Guest
2024	Club Friday The Series Hot Love Issue : Secret of Dating Apps	Ploysai	Main
2024	Ploy's Yearbook	(Ploy Suay) Padparadscha	Main
2025	Maya	Maya	Main
2025	Jet Lag	(Tidgift) Darin Ronroengruethai	
2025	Shine The Series	Daowadee Wattanapisarn	
2026	Club Friday Love Status	Nattamon Loetratanuphon	Main
2026	Jet Lag Season 2	Darin Ronroengruethai	Main
2026	The Miracle of 9,999 Zebras	Prim	Main
2026	My Sexy Shadow	Namjai	Main
2026	Still Water	Pin	Main
TBA	Zomvivor Chapter 2		Main
