= The Mask Mirror =

- Also known as: The Mask Mirror
- Genre: Reality television
- Presented by: Kan Kantathavorn
- Country of origin: Thailand
- Original language: Thai
- No. of episodes: 2 (After Thai Literature); 13 (After Zodiac)

Production
- Camera setup: Multi-camera
- Running time: 105 minutes (1hour 45 minutes)
- Production company: Workpoint Entertainment

Original release
- Network: Workpoint TV
- Release: 15–22 August 2019 (After Thai Literature); 14 November 2019 – 6 February 2020 (After Zodiac)

Related
- Thai Literature; Zodiac; Zodiac (After Thai Literature); Temple Fair (After Zodiac); King of Mask Singer

The Mask Mirror (Thai: เดอะมาสก์ มิเรอร์) is a Thai television program in which guest artists wear masks to conceal their true identities. It aired on Workpoint TV on Thursdays after Thai Literature (15–22 August 2019) and later on after Zodiac (14 November 2019 – 6 February 2020).

The premise of the show involves the public guessing which of the contestants, who are referred to as "Mirrors," have real identities and which have false identities. The program was presented by Kan Kantathavorn.

== Panel of Judges ==
=== After Thai Literature Series ===
No.	Name	Profession
1	Saranyu Winaipanit	Singer, Actor, Voice Actor
2	Siriporn Yooyord	Comedian, Singer
3	Thanawat Prasitsomporn	MC
4	Pijittra Sanguansakpakdee	Actress, Model
5	Maneenuch Smerasut	Singing Teacher
6	Apitsada Kruakongka	Actress, Model
7	Kiattisak Udomnark	MC
8	Jakkawal Saothongyuttitum	Music Producer, Composer

=== After Thai Zodiac Series ===
No.	Name	Profession
1	Yuttana Boon-orm	Music Company Executive
2	Sarunyu Winaipanit	Singer, Actor, Voice Actor
3	Maneenuch Smerasut	Singing Teacher
4	Apitsada Kruakongka	Actress, Model
5	Kiattisak Udomnark	MC
6	Jakkawal Saothongyuttitum	Music Producer, Composer
7	Siriporn Yooyord	Comedian, Singer
8	Thanawat Prasitsomporn	MC
9	Nalin Hohler	Singer, Actress
10	Fon Tanasoontorn	Singer
11	Somkiat Chanphram	Actor, Host
12	Punnasa Promyos	YouTuber, Entertainer
13	Feawfaow Sudswingringo	Actress, MC
14	Napapa Tantrakul	Actress, MC
15	Karnklao Duaysianklao	Singer, Actress
16	Willy McIntosh	Actor, Model, Host
17	Seo Ji-yeon	Actress
18	Sakuntala Teinpairoj	Actress, MC, DJ

== Episodes ==
=== After Thai Literature Series ===
Episode	Order	Stage Name	Song	Identity	Profession	Real/Fake
EP.1	1	Green Tea Worm (Host's Left Hand)	ภาพลวงตา	Rahat Rachakham	Singer	Fake
EP.1	1	Green Tea Worm (Host's Right Hand)	เล่นของสูง	Anuwat Sanguansakpakdee	Singer	Real
EP.1	1	Special Song: อมพระมาพูด (Covered by Green Tea Worms)				
EP.2	2	Carp (Orange)	ผู้ชายคนนี้กำลังหมดแรง	Pongsak Rattanapong	Singer, Actor	Real
EP.2	2	Carp (Pink)	ผู้ชายคนนี้กำลังหมดแรง	Unnop Thongborisut (Old Mask in Line Thai : Threshing Basket Mask)	Singer, Actor	Fake
EP.2	2	Carp (Pink)	เชือกวิเศษ	Unnop Thongborisut (Old Mask in Line Thai : Threshing Basket Mask)	Singer, Actor	Fake
EP.2	2	Carp (Yellow)	ต้องโทษดาว...	Mum Laconics	Singer	Fake
EP.2	2	Carp (Purple)	แทงข้างหลัง..ทะลุถึงหัวใจ	Placarp Chernyim	Comedian	Fake
EP.2	2	Special Song: จริงไม่กลัว (Covered by Carps)				

=== After Zodiac Series ===
Episode	Order	Stage Name	Song	Identity	Profession	Real/Fake
EP.1	1	The Sun (Pink)	สาธุ	Undisclosed		
EP.1	1	The Sun (Red)	สาธุ	Undisclosed		
EP.1	1	The Sun (Orange)	สาธุ	Piyanut Sueachongpru	Singer	Real
EP.1	1	Bee (ฺBlue)	เจ้าช่อมาลี + อีกดอก	Phantila Fooklin	MC, Actress, Singer	Fake
EP.1	1	Bee (Pink)	เจ้าช่อมาลี + อีกดอก	Undisclosed		
EP.1	1	Bee (Orange)	เจ้าช่อมาลี + อีกดอก	Undisclosed		
EP.1	1	Bee (Pink)	ฉันก็รักของฉัน	Darunee Sutthipitux (Old Mask in Line Thai : Albino Elephant Mask)	Actress, MC	Fake
EP.1	1	Bee (Orange)	ฉันก็รักของฉัน	Napatsorn Phutornjai	Singer	Real
EP.1	1	The Sun (Pink)	ฉันก็รักของฉัน	Muanpair Panaboot (Old Mask in Zodiac : Sagittarius Mask)	Singer, DJ	Fake
EP.1	1	The Sun (Red)	ฉันก็รักของฉัน	Phattarawadee Pinthong	Comedian	Fake
EP.1	1	Special Song: ไม่รัก...ไม่ต้อง (Covered by Bees and The Suns)				
Ep.2	2	Little Duck (Western)	หมึกเล่นไฟ	Pol Nopvichai (Old Mask in Thai Literature : Lunar Eclipse Mask)	Singer, Actor	Fake
Ep.2	2	Little Duck (Indian)	บาปบริสุทธิ์	Tanont Chumroen	Singer	Real
Ep.2	2	Little Duck (Chinese)	Still Loving You	Phattarawadee Pinthong	Actor	Fake
Ep.2	2	Special Song: สลัด...สะบัด (Covered by Little Duck (Western) and Little Duck (Indian))				
Ep.2	2	Special Song: พันธ์ทิพย์ (Covered by Little Ducks)				
Ep.3	3	Diamond Crown (Red)	ยิ่งรู้จัก ยิ่งรักเธอ	Pokchat Thiamchai	Actress	Fake
Ep.3	3	Diamond Crown (Pink)	Speechless	Undisclosed		
Ep.3	3	Diamond Crown (Purple)	รักแท้ ดูแลไม่ได้	Undisclosed		
Ep.3	3	Diamond Crown (Pink)	พลิกล็อค	Chinapak Piaklin	Singer	Fake
Ep.3	3	Diamond Crown (Purple)	พลิกล็อค	Wichayanee Piaklin	Singer, Actress	Real
Ep.3	3	Special Song: คุณลำใย (Covered by Diamond Crowns)				
Ep.4	4	Beauty Queen	มอเตอร์ไซค์นุ่งสั้น + มอไซค์รับจ้าง	Undisclosed		
Ep.4	4	Witch	มอเตอร์ไซค์นุ่งสั้น + มอไซค์รับจ้าง	Undisclosed		
Ep.4	4	Princess	มอเตอร์ไซค์นุ่งสั้น + มอไซค์รับจ้าง	Undisclosed		
Ep.4	4	Beauty Queen	I Hate Myself for Loving You	Undisclosed		
Ep.4	4	Witch	I Hate Myself for Loving You	Undisclosed		
Ep.4	4	Princess	I Hate Myself for Loving You	Undisclosed		
Ep.4	4	Beauty Queen	She's Gone	Siriporn Yuyod (Old Mask in Season 1 : Princess Mask)	Singer, Comedian	Switch Mask
Ep.4	4	Witch	She's Gone	Apaporn Nakhonsawan (Old Mask in Season 2 : Beauty Queen Mask)	Singer	Switch Mask
Ep.4	4	Princess	She's Gone	Sunaree Ratchasrima (Old Mask in Season 1 : Witch Mask)	Singer	Switch Mask
Ep.4	4	Special Song: ผู้ชายของฉัน (Covered by Fon Tanasoontorn)				
Ep.5	5	Pork Chili Dip (Red)	คนตอบบ่อยู่	Undisclosed		
Ep.5	5	Pork Chili Dip (Brown)	เมาทุกขวดเจ็บปวดทุกเพลง	Undisclosed		
Ep.5	5	Pork Chili Dip (Green)	อย่าให้เขารู้	Undisclosed		
Ep.5	5	Pork Chili Dip (Red)	ชู้รัก	Rangsan Panyarueng	Singer	Real
Ep.5	5	Pork Chili Dip (Brown)	ชู้รัก	Siwadon Janthasewee (Old Mask in Project A : Pot Crow Mask)	Comedian, Actor, Singer	Fake
Ep.5	5	Pork Chili Dip (Green)	ชู้รัก	Patcharapon Panphum	Singer	Fake
Ep.5	5	Special Song: คนบ้านเดียวกัน (Covered by Pork Chili Dips and the judges)				
Ep.6	6	Ice (Green Bucket)	ประเทือง	King Konbai	Comedian	Fake
Ep.6	6	Ice (Blue Bucket)	จำฉันได้หรือเปล่า	Arunpong Chaiwinit	Singer	Fake
Ep.6	6	Ice (Red Bucket)	เพราะว่ารัก	Jazz Chuanchuen	Comedian, Actor, Singer	Real
Ep.6	6	Special Song: มือลั่น (Covered by Ices)				
Ep.7	7	Wanthong (Pink Flower)	ห่างหน่อยถอยนิด	Parada Thitawachira	Singer	Fake
Ep.7	7	Wanthong (Silver Flower)	ห่างหน่อยถอยนิด	Feawfaow Sudswingringo	Actress, MC	Fake
Ep.7	7	Wanthong (Golden Flower)	ห่างหน่อยถอยนิด	Pimlada Chaiprichawit	Singer	Fake
Ep.7	7	Wanthong (Green Flower)	Kiss and Make Up	Junjira Junphitakchai	Singer	Fake
Ep.7	7	Wanthong (Blue Flower)	Kiss and Make Up	Kornpassorn Duaysianklao	Singer, Actress	Real
Ep.7	7	Special Song: เหรอ (Covered by Wanthongs)				
Ep.8	8	Apple (Arrow)	ใจสั่งมา	Marut Chuenchomboon	DJ	Fake
Ep.8	8	Apple (Knife)	คิดถึงกันบ้างไหม	Undisclosed		
Ep.8	8	Apple (Worm)	Home	Undisclosed		
Ep.8	8	Apple (Knife)	รักด้วยน้ำตา	Thanapol Mahathorn	Music Producer, Singer	Fake
Ep.8	8	Apple (Worm)	รักด้วยน้ำตา	Jaruwat Cheawaram	Singer, MC	Fake
Ep.8	8	Apple (Axe)	รักด้วยน้ำตา	Pramote Pathan	Singer, Presenter	Real
Ep.8	8	Special Song: มีแฟนแล้ว (Covered by Apples)				
Ep.9	9	Giantess of the Pacific Sea (Red)	บ้าบอ	Kiattisak Udomnark	MC	Real
Ep.9	9	Giantess of the Andaman Sea (Blue)	คำว่าฮักกัน มันเหี่ยถิ่มไส	Jukkabum Chernyim (Old Mask in Season 1 : Tuxedo Mask)	Comedian	Fake
Ep.9	9	Giantess of the Gulf of Thailand (Yellow)	You're Beautiful	Nitikorn Simalee	Singer	Fake
Ep.9	9	Giantess of the Mediterranean Sea (Green)	เกิดมาแค่รักกัน	Chaloempol Tikampornteerawong (Old Mask in Season 1 : Warrior Mask)	Actor, Presenter	Fake
Ep.9	9	Special Song: แอบเหงา (Covered by Giantesses)				
Ep.10	10	Basil (Squid)	รักครั้งแรก	Thinnakorn Phuengtarawee	Singer	Fake
Ep.10	10	Basil (Shrimp)	รักเธอเสมอ	Somphong Kunapratom (Old Mask in Season 2 : Dinosaur Mask)	Singer, Actor	Fake
Ep.10	10	Basil (Pork)	ใจฉันอยู่กับเธอ	Kornpob Janjaroen	Singer, Actor	Real
Ep.10	10	Special Song: เต้นรำทำครัว (Covered by Basils)				
Ep.11	11	Taurus (Red)	Anaconda + รองูเข้าฝัน	Thanawat Prasitsomporn	MC	Real
Ep.11	11	Taurus (Black)	อย่าทำให้ฟ้าผิดหวัง	Suradet Piniwat	Singer, Actor	Fake
Ep.11	11	Taurus (Green)	สามสิบยังแจ๋ว	Orachorn Chernyim	Comedian	Fake
Ep.11	11	Taurus (White)	ใจหนึ่งก็รัก อีกใจก็เจ็บ	Khemarat Soonthornnont	DJ, Actor, Singer	Fake
Ep.11	11	Special Song: เอาไปผัวเทิร์น (Covered by Tauruses)				
Ep.12	12	White Crow (Green Beak)	ไม่รักดี	Sakuntala Thianphairot (Old Mask in Season 2 : Mushroom Mask and Project A : Sea Urchin (Pink) Mask)	DJ	Fake
Ep.12	12	White Crow (Yellow Beak)	โรคประจำตัว	Undisclosed		
Ep.12	12	White Crow (Red Beak)	โรคประจำตัว	Undisclosed		
Ep.12	12	White Crow (Yellow Beak)	ยิ่งรู้ยิ่งไม่เข้าใจ	Nipaporn Thititanakarn	Singer	Real
Ep.12	12	White Crow (Red Beak)	หัวใจหมดแรง	Tanainan Teerahtempricha	Singer	Fake
Ep.12	12	Special Song: ชีวิตยังคงสวยงาม (Covered by Black Crows and White Crows)				
Ep.13	13	Black Crow (Iron Beak)	เธอยัง	Pichet Buakham	Singer	Fake
Ep.13	13	Black Crow (Chili Holding Beak)	เพลงนี้เกี่ยวกับความรัก	Aritat Pholtan (Old Mask in Thai Literature : Snake-Shaped Loop Mask)	Singer	Fake
Ep.13	13	Black Crow (Wooden Beak)	บอกสักคำ	Jirakorn Sompithak	Singer	Real
