= The Mask Zodiac =

- Also known as: The Mask Zodiac
- Genre: Reality television
- Presented by: Kan Kantathavorn
- Country of origin: Thailand
- Original language: Thai
- No. of episodes: 11

Production
- Camera setup: Multi-camera
- Running time: 105 minutes
- Production company: Workpoint Entertainment

Original release
- Network: Workpoint TV
- Release: 29 August – 7 November 2019

Related
- Thai Literature; Mirror; King of Mask Singer

The Mask Zodiac (Thai: เดอะแมสก์ จักรราศี) is the eighth season of The Mask Singer, a Thai singing competition program presented by Kan Kantathavorn. The program aired on Workpoint TV on Thursday at 20:05 from 29 August 2019 to 7 November 2019.

The tournament format is different from other side series. It has only 12 contestants. This season combines zodiac signs and astrology.

== Panel of Judges ==
No.	Name	Profession
1	Kapol Thongplub	DJ, MC
2	Mum Laconics	Singer
3	Maneenuch Smerasut	Singing Teacher
4	Apissada Kreurkongka	Actress, Model
5	Kiattisak Udomnak	MC
6	Jakkawal Saothongyuttitum	Music Producer, Composer
7	Siriporn Yooyord	Comedienne, Singer
8	Thanawat Prasitsomporn	MC
9	Akhamsiri Suwanasuk	Actress
10	Samapon Piyapongsiri	MC, DJ, Actor
11	Puttachat Pongsuchat	DJ, Actress
12	Yutthana Boonaom	Music Company Executive

== First round ==
Order	Episode	Stage Name	Song	Identity	Profession	Result
1	EP.1	Scorpio	อย่าฝากความหวัง + เงา + Reflection	Undisclosed		Advanced to Semi-Final
1	EP.1	Aries	เมื่อวาน	Undisclosed		Advanced to Semi-Final
1	EP.1	Gemini (Red)	ขอเช็ดน้ำตา	Ball Chernyim	Comedian	Eliminated
1	EP.1	Gemini (Green)	ขอเช็ดน้ำตา	Robert Saikwan	Comedian	Eliminated
2	EP.2	Leo	เชื่อฉัน	Ford Sobchai	Singer, Composer, Producer	Eliminated
2	EP.2	Taurus	ใครนิยาม + แพ้แล้วพาล	Undisclosed		Advanced to Semi-Final
2	EP.2	Sagittarius	Solo	Undisclosed		Advanced to Semi-Final
3	EP.3	Virgo	ขีดเส้นใต้	Green Atsadaporn	Singer, Actress	Eliminated
3	EP.3	Cancer	Swalla	Undisclosed		Advanced to Semi-Final
3	EP.3	Libra	ร็อกกระทบไม้	Undisclosed		Advanced to Semi-Final
4	EP.4	Capricorn	A Love Before Time + หงส์เหนือมังกร	Poom Orawan	Singer	Eliminated
4	EP.4	Aquarius	อะไรก็ยอม	Undisclosed		Advanced to Semi-Final
4	EP.4	Pisces	Bohemian Rhapsody	Undisclosed		Advanced to Semi-Final

== Semi-final ==
Order	Episode	Stage Name	Song	Identity	Profession	Result
1	EP.5	Aquarius	บัวช้ำ น้ำขุ่น	Fon Tanasoontorn	Singer	Eliminated
1	EP.5	Sagittarius	อาวรณ์ (I Want You)	Undisclosed		Advanced to The Last Four
1	Duet: ผีเสื้อราตรี					
2	EP.6	Aries	เมื่อคืน	Typhoon Kanokchat Munyad-on	Singer, Actor	Eliminated
2	EP.6	Scorpio	คิดถึงจัง (มาหาหน่อย) + Love On Top	Undisclosed		Advanced to The Last Four
2	Duet: รักเธอแต่เธอไม่รู้ (Featuring : Pijika Jittaputta)					
3	EP.7	Libra	All I Ask	Rudklao Amratisha	Singer, Actress	Eliminated
3	EP.7	Taurus	กรรม + กรรมตามสนอง + ช่วงนี้ (Karma)	Undisclosed		Advanced to The Last Four
3	Duet: รักกันมั้ย					
4	EP.8	Cancer	Kill This Love	Kang Korn	Singer, Actor	Eliminated
4	EP.8	Pisces	ยายสำอาง	Undisclosed		Advanced to The Last Four
4	Duet: คืนนี้อยากได้กี่ครั้ง					

== The Last Four/The Last Three ==
=== The Last Four ===
Episode	Order	Stage Name	Song	Identity	Profession	Result
EP.9	1	Scorpio	เธอ...ผู้ไม่แพ้ + ชีวิตลิขิตเอง (Life Designer)	Undisclosed		Advanced to The Last Three
EP.9	2	Taurus	ภาวนา + เลิกรา	DJ Nui	MC	Eliminated
EP.9	3	Sagittarius	Secret Love Song	Undisclosed		Advanced to The Last Three
EP.9	4	Pisces	กอดฉัน	Undisclosed		Advanced to The Last Three
EP.9	Group song: ดาวกระดาษ					

=== The Last Three ===
Episode	Order	Stage Name	Song	Identity	Profession	Result
EP.10	1	Scorpio	มะลึกกึ๊กกึ๋ยย์ + O.K. นะคะ + พูดอีกที	Dao Nathapatsorn Simasthien	Singer, Actress, DJ	Eliminated
EP.10	2	Pisces	แดงกับเขียว	Undisclosed		Advanced to Final
EP.10	3	Sagittarius	แค่นั้น	Undisclosed		Advanced to Final
EP.10	Group Song: ลองรวย + เงินน่ะมีไหม					

== Final ==
Episode	Order	Stage Name	Song	Identity	Profession	Result
EP.11	1	Pisces	หลับตา + โลกที่ไม่มีเธอ	Aek Season Five	Singer	Runner-up
EP.11	2	Sagittarius	เธอ + เรา + คู่ชีวิต	Ging The Star	Singer, DJ	Champion
EP.11	Duet: รักจริงให้ติงนัง (Featuring : Rung Suriya)					

== Elimination table ==
Contestant	Identity	Ep.1	Ep.2	Ep.3	Ep.4	Ep.5	Ep.6	Ep.7	Ep.8	Ep.9	Ep.10	Ep.11
Sagittarius	Ging The Star	—N/a	SAFE	—N/a	—N/a	SAFE	—N/a	—N/a	—N/a	SAFE	SAFE	Winner
Pisces	Aek Season Five	—N/a	—N/a	—N/a	SAFE	—N/a	—N/a	—N/a	SAFE	SAFE	SAFE	Runner-up
Scorpio	Dao Nathapatsorn Simasthien	SAFE	—N/a	—N/a	—N/a	—N/a	SAFE	—N/a	—N/a	SAFE	OUT	
Taurus	DJ Nui	—N/a	SAFE	—N/a	—N/a	—N/a	—N/a	SAFE	—N/a	OUT		
Cancer	Kang Korn	—N/a	—N/a	SAFE	—N/a	—N/a	—N/a	—N/a	OUT			
Libra	Rudklao Amratisha	—N/a	—N/a	SAFE	—N/a	—N/a	—N/a	OUT				
Aries	Typhoon Kanokchat Munyad-on	SAFE	—N/a	—N/a	—N/a	—N/a	OUT					
Aquarius	Fon Tanasoontorn	—N/a	—N/a	—N/a	SAFE	OUT						
Capricorn	Poom Orawan	—N/a	—N/a	—N/a	OUT							
Virgo	Green Atsadaporn	—N/a	—N/a	OUT								
Leo	Ford Sobchai	—N/a	OUT									
Gemini	Ball Chernyim and Robert Saikwan	OUT										

This contestant won the battle and moves on to the next round.
This contestant is safe from elimination.
This contestant is eliminated.
