= The Wall Song =

- Genre: Game show
- Presented by: Siwat Chotchaicharin
- Country of origin: Thailand
- Original language: Thai

Production
- Production location: Workpoint Studio
- Running time: approximately 60 minutes

Original release
- Network: Workpoint TV
- Release: September 10, 2020 – present

The Wall Song (Thai: ร้องข้ามกำแพง) it is a reality television program, a game show, and a music show which is produced and licensed owner by Workpoint Entertainment broadcast every Thursday at 20:15 first aired on September 10, 2020, on Workpoint TV it aired after The Mask Singer program. The show was originally hosted by Kan Kantathavorn, but after Kan was issued an arrest warrant for The iCon Group case, the show changed hosts to Siwat Chotchaicharin since October 17, 2024 until now.

== Format ==
In each episode of the show, three celebrity guests (sometimes a pair of guests can be counted as one) perform a duet each week with a different hidden singer behind a wall. The other celebrity guests and the host can all see the hidden singer. After the performance, the celebrity guest who sang in front of the wall must guess the identity of the hidden singer, while the other guests and host playfully offer misleading hints.

== Reception ==
The program won the Best Variety Show category at the 13th and 14th Nataraja Awards (for 2021 and 2022), as well as Best Game Show at the 35th TV Gold Awards (for 2020).

== International format licensing ==
Workpoint has licensed the format of The Wall Song for international productions, with the franchise known as Wall Duet. Adaptations include The Wall Song Cambodia, Secret Duets (Netherlands), Wall Duet (Brazil), Hemmelige Duetter (Norway), Lạ Lắm À Nha (Vietnam), etc.
