= The Mask Thai Literature =

- Also known as: The Mask Thai Literature
- Genre: Reality television
- Presented by: Kan Kantathavorn
- Country of origin: Thailand
- Original language: Thai
- No. of episodes: 20

Production
- Camera setup: Multi-camera
- Running time: 105 minutes
- Production company: Workpoint Entertainment

Original release
- Network: Workpoint TV
- Release: 28 March – 8 August 2019

Related
- Line Thai; Mirror; King of Mask Singer

The Mask Thai Literature (Thai: เดอะแมสก์ วรรณคดีไทย) is the seventh season of The Mask Singer, a Thai singing competition program presented by Kan Kantathavorn. The program aired on Workpoint TV on Thursday at 20:05 from 28 March 2019 to 8 August 2019.

The tournament format is similar to that of The Mask Line Thai. But the difference is this season was combined with Thai literature.

== Panel of Judges ==
| No. | Name | Profession |
|---|---|---|
| 1 | Maneenuch Smerasut | Singing teacher |
| 2 | Jakkawal Saothongyuttitum | Music producer, composer |
| 3 | Tachaya Prathumwan | Singer, musician |
| 4 | Nalin Hohler | Singer, actress |
| 5 | Saranyu Winaipanit | Singer, actor, voice actor |
| 6 | Kapol Thongplub | DJ, MC |
| 7 | Kiattisak Udomnak | MC |
| 8 | Napassorn Phuthornjai | Singer |
| 9 | Piyanut Sueajongpru | Singer |
| 10 | Yutthana Boonaom | Music executive |
| 11 | Mum Laconics | Singer |
| 12 | Viritipa Pakdeeprasong | Actress, model, hostess |
| 13 | Thanawat Prasitsomporn | MC |
| 14 | Siriporn Yooyord | Comedienne, singer |
| 15 | Apissada Kreurkongka | Actress, model |
| 16 | Yinglee Srijumpol | Singer |
| 17 | Apaporn Nakornsawan | Singer |
| 18 | Jirakorn Sompitak | Singer |
| 19 | Saksit Vejsupaporn | Pianist, singer |
| 20 | Jingreedkhao Wongtewan | Singer |
| 21 | Pongsak Pongsuwan | Comedian, singer |
| 22 | Tai Orathai | Singer |
| 23 | Pexky Sretunya | Actress, MC |
| 24 | Sakuntala Thianphairot | DJ, actress, host |
| 25 | Kornkan Sutthikoses | Actor, MC, news anchor |
| 26 | Nachat Juntapun | Actor, host, singer |
| 27 | Samapon Piyapongsiri | MC, DJ, actor |

== First round ==
=== Group 1 Mai Ek ===
| Order | Episode | Stage Name | Song | Identity | Profession | Result |
|---|---|---|---|---|---|---|
| 1 | EP.1 | Conch | อยากได้ยินว่ารักกัน | Undisclosed | | Advanced to Semi-Final |
| 1 | EP.1 | Wanthong | น้องนอนไม่หลับ + Ddu-Du Ddu-Du | Undisclosed | | Advanced to Semi-Final |
| 1 | EP.1 | Simok Horse | สเตตัสถืกถิ่ม | Kacha | Singer | Eliminated |
| 1 | EP.1 | Special Show: Sepha (Performed by Tachaya Prathumwan) | | | | |
| 2 | EP.2 | Rotchana | 100 เหตุผล + รักได้ครั้งละคน เชื่อใจได้คนละครั้ง | Uan Warunee | Singer | Eliminated |
| 2 | EP.2 | Snake-Shaped Loop | รักเธอให้น้อยลง | Undisclosed | | Advanced to Semi-Final |
| 2 | EP.2 | Lunar Eclipse | แด่คนเคยรัก | Undisclosed | | Advanced to Semi-Final |
| 2 | EP.2 | Special Show: สักวาปากหวาน (Covered by Napassorn Phuthornjai and Piyanut Sueajongpru) | | | | |

=== Group 2 Mai Tho ===
| Order | Episode | Stage Name | Song | Identity | Profession | Result |
|---|---|---|---|---|---|---|
| 1 | EP.3 | Jatayu | บักแตงโม | Peter Corp Dyrendal | Singer, Actor | Eliminated |
| 1 | EP.3 | Matthana | ไม่เคย | Undisclosed | | Advanced to Semi-Final |
| 1 | EP.3 | Macchanu | เลือกได้ไหม | Undisclosed | | Advanced to Semi-Final |
| 1 | EP.3 | Special Show: แหลก (Covered by Issara Kitnitchi) | | | | |
| 2 | EP.4 | | | | | |
| 2 | EP.4 | Ko Kaew Phitsadan | แววตา | Micky Piyawat | Singer, Music Producer, Composer | Eliminated |
| 2 | EP.4 | Holvichai | คำยินดี | Undisclosed | | Advanced to Semi-Final |
| 2 | EP.4 | Kavee | คำยินดี | Undisclosed | | Advanced to Semi-Final |
| 2 | EP.4 | Phikunthong | ซังได้ซังแล้ว | Undisclosed | | Advanced to Semi-Final |
| 2 | EP.4 | Special Show: สยามเมืองยิ้ม (Covered by Saranyu Winaipanit and Mum Laconics) | | | | |

=== Group 3 Mai Tri ===
| Order | Episode | Stage Name | Song | Identity | Profession | Result |
|---|---|---|---|---|---|---|
| 1 | EP.5 | Princess Sanonoi | เธอเก่ง (Still) | Undisclosed | | Advanced to Semi-Final |
| 1 | EP.5 | Khun Chang | รักเธอนิรันดร์ | DJ Man | DJ, Actor | Eliminated |
| 1 | EP.5 | Twelve Sisters | นานเท่าไรก็รอ | Undisclosed | | Advanced to Semi-Final |
| 1 | EP.5 | Special Show: ที่รักหรือที่พัก (Performed by Yinglee Srijumpol) | | | | |
| 2 | EP.6 | Chalawan | ไหนว่าจะไม่หลอกกัน | Undisclosed | | Advanced to Semi-Final |
| 2 | EP.6 | Ahiravan | เรื่องขี้หมา | Undisclosed | | Advanced to Semi-Final |
| 2 | EP.6 | Khwan Fa Na Dam | อย่างน้อย | Big Sarut | Actor, Musician | Eliminated |
| 2 | EP.6 | Special Show: เชพบ๊ะ (Performed by Apaporn Nakornsawan) | | | | |

=== Group 4 Mai Chattawa ===
| Order | Episode | Stage Name | Song | Identity | Profession | Result |
|---|---|---|---|---|---|---|
| 1 | EP.7 | Siamese Fireback | จุดอ่อนของฉันอยู่ที่หัวใจ | Rung Suriya | Singer | Eliminated |
| 1 | EP.7 | Vetala | ไว้ใจ | Undisclosed | | Advanced to Semi-Final |
| 1 | EP.7 | Phanthurat | เธอทำให้ฉันเสียใจ | Undisclosed | | Advanced to Semi-Final |
| 1 | EP.7 | Special Show: เท่อย่างไทย (Covered by Jirakorn Sompitak) | | | | |
| 2 | EP.8 | Kraithong | เวลาไม่ช่วยอะไร + เวลาจะช่วยอะไร | Pe Hi-Rock | Singer | Eliminated |
| 2 | EP.8 | Black Dragon Horse | ขอบใจที่พูดแรง | Undisclosed | | Advanced to Semi-Final |
| 2 | EP.8 | Mekkhala | พ่อทูนหัว | Undisclosed | | Advanced to Semi-Final |
| 2 | EP.8 | Special Show: โยกย้ายส่ายสะโพก (Performed by Jingreedkhao Wongtewan) | | | | |

== Semi-final ==
=== Group 1 Mai Ek ===
| Order | Episode | Stage Name | Song | Identity | Profession | Result |
|---|---|---|---|---|---|---|
| 1 | EP.9 | Snake-Shaped Loop | ดีแต่ปาก | Undisclosed | | Advanced to Final |
| 1 | EP.9 | Wanthong | ลาลาลอย (100%) | Undisclosed | | Advanced to Final |
| 1 | EP.9 | Lunar Eclipse | กฎของคนแพ้ | Pete Phol | Singer, Actor | Eliminated |
| 1 | EP.9 | Conch | ในฤดูที่ต่างไป | Paowalee | Singer | Eliminated |
| 1 | EP.9 | Special Show: กินตับ (Performed by Pongsak Pongsuwan and Semi-Final Group Mai Ek) | | | | |

=== Group 2 Mai Tho ===
| Order | Episode | Stage Name | Song | Identity | Profession | Result |
|---|---|---|---|---|---|---|
| 1 | EP.10 | Macchanu | อย่าทำอย่างนี้ไม่ว่ากับใคร...เข้าใจไหม | Krissanapoom Pibulsonggram | Actor, Musician | Eliminated |
| 1 | EP.10 | Phikunthong | ขอโทษ...หัวใจ | Fai Am Fine | Singer | Eliminated |
| 1 | EP.10 | Matthana | คิดมาก | Undisclosed | | Advanced to Final |
| 1 | EP.10 | Holvichai | เพียงข้างหลัง | Undisclosed | | Advanced to Final |
| 1 | EP.10 | Kavee | เพียงข้างหลัง | Undisclosed | | Advanced to Final |
| 1 | EP.10 | Special Show: ดาวเต้น ม.ต้น (Performed by Tai Orathai and Semi-Final Group Mai Tho) | | | | |

=== Group 3 Mai Tri ===
| Order | Episode | Stage Name | Song | Identity | Profession | Result |
|---|---|---|---|---|---|---|
| 1 | EP.11 | Ahiravan | ทาส | R Arnuttaphol | Singer, Actor | Eliminated |
| 1 | EP.11 | Twelve Sisters | โยนใจให้หมากิน | Lamyai Hai Thongkham | Singer, Actress | Eliminated |
| 1 | EP.11 | Chalawan | ไม่ตายหรอกเธอ | Undisclosed | | Advanced to Final |
| 1 | EP.11 | Princess Sanonoi | หนุ่มน้อย | Undisclosed | | Advanced to Final |
| 1 | EP.11 | Special Show: คิดฮอด (Covered by Siriporn Ampaipong and Semi-Final Group Mai Tri) | | | | |

=== Group 4 Mai Chattawa ===
| Order | Episode | Stage Name | Song | Identity | Profession | Result |
|---|---|---|---|---|---|---|
| 1 | EP.12 | Black Dragon Horse | รำคาญกะบอกกันเด้อ | Tao Sattaphong | Singer, Actor | Eliminated |
| 1 | EP.12 | Phanthurat | เขียนให้เธอ | Undisclosed | | Advanced to Final |
| 1 | EP.12 | Vetala | สิ่งของ | Chart Suchart | Singer | Eliminated |
| 1 | EP.12 | Mekkhala | เขาไปแล้ว | Undisclosed | | Advanced to Final |
| 1 | EP.12 | Special Show: รักสุดแผ่นดินสิ้นแผ่นฟ้า (Performed by Kornkan Sutthikoses and Semi-Final Group Mai Chattawa) | | | | |

== Final ==
| Group | Episode | Stage Name | Song | Identity | Profession | Result |
|---|---|---|---|---|---|---|
| Mai Ek | EP.13 | Wanthong | ชอบแบบนี้ + งัดถั่งงัด | Undisclosed | | Advanced to Champ VS Champ |
| Mai Ek | EP.13 | Snake-Shaped Loop | แม่ | Boy Lomosonic | Singer | Eliminated |
| Mai Ek | EP.13 | Duet: เธอหมุนรอบฉัน ฉันหมุนรอบเธอ | | | | |
| Mai Tho | EP.14 | Matthana | คราม | Pijika | Singer, Actress | Eliminated |
| Mai Tho | EP.14 | Holvichai | ใจสั่งมา + เลิกคุยทั้งอำเภอเพื่อเธอคนเดียว | Undisclosed | | Advanced to Champ VS Champ |
| Mai Tho | EP.14 | Kavee | ใจสั่งมา + เลิกคุยทั้งอำเภอเพื่อเธอคนเดียว | Undisclosed | | Advanced to Champ VS Champ |
| Mai Tho | EP.14 | Trio: แม่อยากอุ้มหลาน + จะขอก็รีบขอ | | | | |
| Mai Tri | EP.15 | Princess Sanonoi | ระเบิดเวลา | Undisclosed | | Advanced to Champ VS Champ |
| Mai Tri | EP.15 | Chalawan | น้ำใต้ศอก | Silvy Pavida | Singer, Actress | Eliminated |
| Mai Tri | EP.15 | Duet: เสือ | | | | |
| Mai Chattawa | EP.16 | Mekkhala | สัญญากับใจ | Undisclosed | | Advanced to Champ VS Champ |
| Mai Chattawa | EP.16 | Phanthurat | แผ่นดินไหวในใจอ้าย | Nan Sathida | Singer, Actress | Eliminated |
| Mai Chattawa | EP.16 | Duet: หญิงลั้ลลา | | | | |

== Champ VS Champ ==
=== First round ===
| Episode | Champ from group | Stage Name | Song | Identity | Profession | Result |
|---|---|---|---|---|---|---|
| EP.17 | Mai Ek | Wanthong | โลกใหม่สวยงาม + A Whole New World | Undisclosed | | Advanced to Second Round |
| EP.17 | Mai Tho | Holvichai | วัดใจ | Undisclosed | | Advanced to Second Round |
| EP.17 | Mai Tho | Kavee | วัดใจ | Undisclosed | | Advanced to Second Round |
| EP.17 | Mai Tri | Princess Sanonoi | เขียนถึงคนบนฟ้า | Kaimook Rungrat | Singer, Actress | Eliminated |
| EP.17 | Mai Chattawa | Mekkhala | สี่กษัตริย์เดินดง | Undisclosed | | Advanced to Second Round |
| EP.17 | Group song: Too Much So Much Very Much | | | | | |

=== Second round ===
| Episode | Champ from group | Stage Name | Song | Identity | Profession | Result |
|---|---|---|---|---|---|---|
| EP.18 | Mai Ek | Wanthong | หลอก + โกหก | Grand Kornpassorn | Singer, Actress | Eliminated |
| EP.18 | Mai Tho | Holvichai | แค่คนโทรผิด | Undisclosed | | Advanced to Champ of the Champ |
| EP.18 | Mai Tho | Kavee | แค่คนโทรผิด | Undisclosed | | Advanced to Champ of the Champ |
| EP.18 | Mai Chattawa | Mekkhala | สังหารหมู่ | Undisclosed | | Advanced to Champ of the Champ |
| EP.18 | Group song: รบกวนมารักกัน + ซักกะนิด | | | | | |

== Champ of the Champ ==
| Episode | Champ from group | Stage Name | Song | Identity | Profession | Result |
|---|---|---|---|---|---|---|
| EP.19 | Mai Tho | Holvichai | กาลครั้งหนึ่ง | Sivakorn Adulsuttikul | Singer, Actor | Champions |
| EP.19 | Mai Tho | Kavee | กาลครั้งหนึ่ง | Jackrin Kungwankiatichai | Singer, Actor | Champions |
| EP.19 | Mai Chattawa | Mekkhala | ฮัก ฮัก ฮัก + Hug | Suratikan Phakcharoen | Singer | Runner-up |
| EP.19 | Trio: ให้นานกว่าที่เคย | | | | | |

== Celebration of The Mask Champion ==
| Episode | Song | Stage Name |
|---|---|---|
| EP.20 | บ่งึดจักเม็ด | Princess Sanonoi, Mekkhala, Holvichai and Kavee, Black Dragon Horse, Simok Horse |
| EP.20 | เพราะอะไร | Princess Sanonoi, Matana, Mekkhala |
| EP.20 | ยักษ์ใหญ่ไล่ยักษ์เล็ก | Ahiravan, Snake-Shaped Loop, Chalawan |
| EP.20 | ธารารัตน์ | Wanthong, Macchanu, Holvichai and Kavee |
| EP.20 | ทุ้มอยู่ในใจ | All masked singers |

== Elimination table ==
| Contestant | Identity | Ep.1 | Ep.2 | Ep.3 | Ep.4 | Ep.5 | Ep.6 | Ep.7 | Ep.8 | Ep.9 | Ep.10 | Ep.11 | Ep.12 | Ep.13 | Ep.14 | Ep.15 | Ep.16 | Ep.17 | Ep.18 | Ep.19 |
|---|---|---|---|---|---|---|---|---|---|---|---|---|---|---|---|---|---|---|---|---|
| Holvichai & Kavee | Porsche Sivakorn & Jackie Jackrin | —N/a | —N/a | —N/a | SAFE | —N/a | —N/a | —N/a | —N/a | —N/a | SAFE | —N/a | —N/a | —N/a | WIN | —N/a | —N/a | SAFE | SAFE | Winners |
| Mekkhala | Earn Suratikan | —N/a | —N/a | —N/a | —N/a | —N/a | —N/a | —N/a | SAFE | —N/a | —N/a | —N/a | SAFE | —N/a | —N/a | —N/a | WIN | SAFE | SAFE | Runner-up |
| Wanthong | Grand Kornpassorn | SAFE | —N/a | —N/a | —N/a | —N/a | —N/a | —N/a | —N/a | SAFE | —N/a | —N/a | —N/a | WIN | —N/a | —N/a | —N/a | SAFE | OUT | |
| Princess Sanonoi | Kaimook Rungrat | —N/a | —N/a | —N/a | —N/a | SAFE | —N/a | —N/a | —N/a | —N/a | —N/a | SAFE | —N/a | —N/a | —N/a | WIN | —N/a | OUT | | |
| Phanthurat | Nan Sathida | —N/a | —N/a | —N/a | —N/a | —N/a | —N/a | SAFE | —N/a | —N/a | —N/a | —N/a | SAFE | —N/a | —N/a | —N/a | OUT | | | |
| Chalawan | Silvy Pavida | —N/a | —N/a | —N/a | —N/a | —N/a | SAFE | —N/a | —N/a | —N/a | —N/a | SAFE | —N/a | —N/a | —N/a | OUT | | | | |
| Matthana | Pijika | —N/a | —N/a | SAFE | —N/a | —N/a | —N/a | —N/a | —N/a | —N/a | SAFE | —N/a | —N/a | —N/a | OUT | | | | | |
| Snake-Shaped Loop | Boy Lomosonic | —N/a | SAFE | —N/a | —N/a | —N/a | —N/a | —N/a | —N/a | SAFE | —N/a | —N/a | —N/a | OUT | | | | | | |
| Vetala | Chart Suchart | —N/a | —N/a | —N/a | —N/a | —N/a | —N/a | SAFE | —N/a | —N/a | —N/a | —N/a | OUT | | | | | | | |
| Black Dragon Horse | Tao Sattaphong | —N/a | —N/a | —N/a | —N/a | —N/a | —N/a | —N/a | SAFE | —N/a | —N/a | —N/a | OUT | | | | | | | |
| Twelve Sisters | Lamyai Hai Thongkham | —N/a | —N/a | —N/a | —N/a | SAFE | —N/a | —N/a | —N/a | —N/a | —N/a | OUT | | | | | | | | |
| Ahiravan | R Arnuttaphol | —N/a | —N/a | —N/a | —N/a | —N/a | SAFE | —N/a | —N/a | —N/a | —N/a | OUT | | | | | | | | |
| Phikunthong | Fai Am Fine | —N/a | —N/a | —N/a | SAFE | —N/a | —N/a | —N/a | —N/a | —N/a | OUT | | | | | | | | | |
| Macchanu | JJ Krissanapoom | —N/a | —N/a | SAFE | —N/a | —N/a | —N/a | —N/a | —N/a | —N/a | OUT | | | | | | | | | |
| Conch | Paowalee | SAFE | —N/a | —N/a | —N/a | —N/a | —N/a | —N/a | —N/a | OUT | | | | | | | | | | |
| Lunar Eclipse | Pete Phol | —N/a | SAFE | —N/a | —N/a | —N/a | —N/a | —N/a | —N/a | OUT | | | | | | | | | | |
| Kraithong | Pe Hi-Rock | —N/a | —N/a | —N/a | —N/a | —N/a | —N/a | —N/a | OUT | | | | | | | | | | | |
| Siamese Fireback | Rung Suriya | —N/a | —N/a | —N/a | —N/a | —N/a | —N/a | OUT | | | | | | | | | | | | |
| Khwan Fa Na Dam | Big Sarut | —N/a | —N/a | —N/a | —N/a | —N/a | OUT | | | | | | | | | | | | | |
| Khun Chang | DJ Man | —N/a | —N/a | —N/a | —N/a | OUT | | | | | | | | | | | | | | |
| Ko Kaew Phitsadan | Micky Piyawat | —N/a | —N/a | —N/a | OUT | | | | | | | | | | | | | | | |
| Jatayu | Peter Corp Dyrendal | —N/a | —N/a | OUT | | | | | | | | | | | | | | | | |
| Rotchana | Uan Warunee | —N/a | OUT | | | | | | | | | | | | | | | | | |
| Simok Horse | Kacha | OUT | | | | | | | | | | | | | | | | | | |

This contestant won the battle and moved on to the next round.
This contestant was safe from elimination.
This contestant was eliminated.
