= The Mask Singer (Thai TV series) season 2 =

The Mask Singer
- Season 2
- Presented by: Kan Kantathavorn
- No. of episodes: 20

Release
- Original network: Workpoint TV
- Original release: 6 April – 17 August 2017

Season chronology
- ← Previous; Season 1 Next → Season 3

The Mask Singer Season 2 (Thai: The Mask Singer หน้ากากนักร้อง ซีซั่นที่ 2) is a Thai singing competition program presented by Kan Kantathavorn. It aired on Workpoint TV on Thursday at 20:00 from 6 April 2017 to 17 August 2017.

== Panel of Judges ==
No.	Name	Profession
1	Maneenuch Samatsut	Singing Teacher
2	Jakkawal Saothongyuttitum	Music Producer, Composer
3	Yuttana Boon-Orm	Music Company Executive
4	Siriporn Yuyod	Singer, Comedian
5	Kiattisak Udomnak	Actor, comedian, singer, TV host
6	Thanawat Prasittisomporn	DJ
7	Nalin Hohler	Singer, Actress
8	Chawalit Srimunkhongtham	DJ, Rapper
9	Rossukhon Kongked	Acting Trainer
10	Ratchawin Wongwiriya	Actress
11	Nattaphon Leeyawanit	Actor
12	Apissada Kueakhongkha	Actress, Model
13	Sujira Arunpiphat	Presenter, Actress
14	Treechada Petcharat	Model, Actress
15	Atthama Cheewanichphan	Actress
16	Kapol Thongplub	DJ, Presenter
17	Thanachaphan Booranacheewawilai	DJ
18	Nattawut Srimork	Rapper, Songwriter
19	Seo Ji-yeon	Singer, Actress

== First round ==
=== Group A ===
Order	Episode	Mask	Song	Identity	Profession	Result
1	EP.1	Devil	I Was Born to Love You	Nam-Pung Natrika	Actress	Eliminated
1	EP.1	Albino Monkey	Somewhere Over the Rainbow	Undisclosed		Advanced to Semi-Final
2	EP.1	Butterfly	นาฬิกาตาย	May Feuang-Arom	Actress	Eliminated
2	EP.1	Flower	หม้ายขันหมาก	Undisclosed		Advanced to Semi-Final
3	EP.2	Golden Pig	Skyfall	Ying Rhatha	Singer, Actress	Eliminated
3	EP.2	Steamed Bun	보고싶다 (I Miss You)	Undisclosed		Advanced to Semi-Final
4	EP.2	Beauty Queen	หนึ่งเดียวคนนี้	Hai Apaporn	Singer	Eliminated
4	EP.2	Pheasant	ชู้ทางใจ	Undisclosed		Advanced to Semi-Final

=== Group B ===
Order	Episode	Stage Name	Song	Identity	Profession	Result
1	EP.3	Old Man	ใจรัก	Wan Thanakrit	Singer, Actor, Songwriter	Eliminated
1	EP.3	Jaguar	You Raise Me Up	Undisclosed		Advanced to Semi-Final
2	EP.3	Basil	ไม่บอกเธอ	Joke So Cool	Singer, Actor	Eliminated
2	EP.3	Spider	Grenade	Undisclosed		Advanced to Semi-Final
3	EP.4	Custard Apple	Please	Rodmay Kaneungnit	Actress	Eliminated
3	EP.4	Black Swan	ควักหัวใจ	Undisclosed		Advanced to Semi-Final
4	EP.4	White Crow	ถ้า	Undisclosed		Advanced to Semi-Final
4	EP.4	Negrito	ใบไม้	Touch Na Takuathung	Singer	Eliminated

=== Group C ===
Order	Episode	Stage Name	Song	Identity	Profession	Result
1	EP.7	Rabbit	Think of Me	Nicole Theriault	Singer	Eliminated
1	EP.7	Oyster	หมดห่วง	Undisclosed		Advanced to Semi-Final
2	EP.7	Dinosaur	เคยรักฉันบ้างไหม	Eed Pong-Lang Sa-On	Singer, Actor	Eliminated
2	EP.7	Lion	New York, New York	Undisclosed		Advanced to Semi-Final
3	EP.8	Ice	ง่ายเกินไป	Jazz Chuanchuen	Comedian, Actor, Singer	Eliminated
3	EP.8	Turtle	คิดถึงเธอทุกที (ที่อยู่คนเดียว)	Undisclosed		Advanced to Semi-Final
4	EP.8	Longan	นอนไม่หลับ	Leew Ajareeya	Singer	Eliminated
4	EP.8	Moose	I Want To Break Free	Undisclosed		Advanced to Semi-Final

=== Group D ===
Order	Episode	Stage Name	Song	Identity	Profession	Result
1	EP.10	Mangosteen	อย่าไปเสียน้ำตา	Tui-Tui Puttachat	DJ, Actress	Eliminated
1	EP.10	Samurai	Feeling Good	Undisclosed		Advanced to Semi-Final
2	EP.10	Compass	ห่างกันสักพัก	Stamp Apiwat	Singer, Songwriter	Eliminated
2	EP.10	Coral	I Dreamed a Dream	Undisclosed		Advanced to Semi-Final
3	EP.11	Mushroom	I Swear	Tom-Hom Sakuntala	DJ	Eliminated
3	EP.11	Bolster	Habits (Stay High)	Undisclosed		Advanced to Semi-Final
4	EP.11	Knight	Too Much Heaven	James Ruangsak	Singer	Eliminated
4	EP.11	Sumo	Time To Say Goodbye	Undisclosed		Advanced to Semi-Final

== Semi-final ==
=== Group A ===
Order	Episode	Stage Name	Song	Identity	Profession	Result
1	EP.5	Steamed Bun	ผิดที่ไว้ใจ	Undisclosed		Advanced to Final
1	EP.5	Pheasant	吻別, กลับบ้านเฮาเต๊อะ, Take Me to Your Heart	ToR Saksit	Pianist, Singer	Eliminated
2	EP.5	Albino Monkey	ล่องเรือหารัก	Maew Chirasak	Singer, Musician	Eliminated
2	EP.5	Flower	ห่วงใย	Undisclosed		Advanced to Final

=== Group B ===
Order	Episode	Stage Name	Song	Identity	Profession	Result
1	EP.6	Spider	When a Man Loves a Woman	Golf Pitchaya	Singer, Actor	Eliminated
1	EP.6	Jaguar	Run to You	Undisclosed		Advanced to Final
2	EP.6	Black Swan	There You'll Be	Joy Siriluk Pongchoke	Actress, Singer	Eliminated
2	EP.6	White Crow	อยู่ไปไม่มีเธอ	Undisclosed		Advanced to Final

=== Group C ===
Order	Episode	Stage Name	Song	Identity	Profession	Result
1	EP.9	Oyster	ตราบธุลีดิน	Undisclosed		Advanced to Final
1	EP.9	Lion	Hello	Tui Theerapat	Actor, Singer	Eliminated
2	EP.9	Turtle	Crazy in Love	Undisclosed		Advanced to Final
2	EP.9	Moose	Part of Your World	Lula Kanyarat	Singer	Eliminated

=== Group D ===
Order	Episode	Stage Name	Song	Identity	Profession	Result
1	EP.12	Samurai	Valerie	Undisclosed		Advanced to Final
1	EP.12	Coral	Reflection	Nam-Cha	Singer, Actress	Eliminated
2	EP.12	Bolster	อยากหยุดเวลา	Ice Preechaya	Actress, Model	Eliminated
2	EP.12	Sumo	Lovin' You	Undisclosed		Advanced to Final

== Final ==
Group	Episode	Stage Name	Song	Identity	Profession	Result
A	EP.13	Steamed Bun	อกหัก	Undisclosed		Advanced to Champ VS Champ
A	EP.13	Flower	I Will Always Love You	Pui-Nai Nattapat	Singer, Actress	Eliminated
A	EP.13	Duet: ขอใจเธอแลกเบอร์โทร				
B	EP.14	Jaguar	เจ้าตาก	Undisclosed		Advanced to Champ VS Champ
B	EP.14	White Crow	It's My Life	Zani Nipaporn	Singer	Eliminated
B	EP.14	Duet: งานเต้นรำในคืนพระจันทร์เต็มดวง				
C	EP.15	Oyster	หน้าหนาวที่แล้ว	Ohm Cocktail	Singer	Eliminated
C	EP.15	Turtle	Bang Bang Bang	Undisclosed		Advanced to Champ VS Champ
C	EP.15	Duet: ฤดูที่แตกต่าง				
D	EP.16	Samurai	ฟั่นเฟือน	Name Getsunova	Singer	Eliminated
D	EP.16	Sumo	ดาวเรืองดาวโรย	Undisclosed		Advanced to Champ VS Champ
D	EP.16	Duet: ชีวิตลิขิตเอง				

== Champ VS Champ ==
=== First round ===
Episode	Champ from group	Stage Name	Song	Identity	Profession	Result
EP.17	A	Steamed Bun	流星雨	Undisclosed		Advanced to Champ VS Champ Second round
EP.17	B	Jaguar	Chandelier	Undisclosed		Advanced to Champ VS Champ Second round
EP.17	C	Turtle	ประมาณนี้ (รึเปล่า), O.K. นะคะ,ไม่ยากหรอก	Panadda Ruengwut	Singer, Actress	Eliminated
EP.17	D	Sumo	Girl on Fire	Undisclosed		Advanced to Champ VS Champ Second round
EP.17	Group song: ด้วยรักและผูกพัน					

=== Second round ===
Episode	Champ from group	Stage Name	Song	Identity	Profession	Result
EP.18	A	Steamed Bun	เงียบ ๆ คนเดียว	Bie KPN	Singer, Actor	Eliminated
EP.18	B	Jaguar	Sticker	Undisclosed		Advanced to Champ of the Champ
EP.18	D	Sumo	ลาวดวงเดือน	Undisclosed		Advanced to Champ of the Champ
EP.18	Group song: Firework					

== Champ of the Champ ==
Episode	Champ from group	Stage Name	Song	Identity	Profession	Result
EP.19	D	Sumo	บัวลอย	Lydia Sarunrat	Singer, Actress	Champion
EP.19	B	Jaguar	I'm sorry (สีดา)	Bee Peerapat	Singer	Runner-up
EP.19	Duet: Nobody's Perfect					

== Celebration of The Mask Champion ==
Episode	Song	Stage Name
EP.20	Love Me like You Do	Durian, Sumo
EP.20	เชพบ๊ะ	Sumo, Turtle
EP.20	นางแมว	Jaguar, Steamed Bun
EP.20	เรา	Sumo, Jaguar, Durian, Kangaroo
EP.20	A Moment Like This	Sumo
EP.20	ว่างแล้วช่วยโทรกลับ	Sumo

== Elimination table ==
Contestant	Identity	Ep.1	Ep.2	Ep.3	Ep.4	Ep.5	Ep.6	Ep.7	Ep.8	Ep.9	Ep.10	Ep.11	Ep.12	Ep.13	Ep.14	Ep.15	Ep.16	Ep.17	Ep.18	Ep.19
Sumo	Lydia Sarunrat	—N/a	—N/a	—N/a	—N/a	—N/a	—N/a	—N/a	—N/a	—N/a	—N/a	WIN	WIN	—N/a	—N/a	—N/a	WIN	SAFE	SAFE	Winner
Jaguar	Bee Peerapat	—N/a	—N/a	WIN	—N/a	—N/a	WIN	—N/a	—N/a	—N/a	—N/a	—N/a	—N/a	—N/a	WIN	—N/a	—N/a	SAFE	SAFE	Runner-up
Steamed Bun	Bie KPN	—N/a	WIN	—N/a	—N/a	WIN	—N/a	—N/a	—N/a	—N/a	—N/a	—N/a	—N/a	WIN	—N/a	—N/a	—N/a	SAFE	OUT	
Turtle	Panadda Ruengwut	—N/a	—N/a	—N/a	—N/a	—N/a	—N/a	—N/a	WIN	WIN	—N/a	—N/a	—N/a	—N/a	—N/a	WIN	—N/a	OUT		
Samurai	Name Getsunova	—N/a	—N/a	—N/a	—N/a	—N/a	—N/a	—N/a	—N/a	—N/a	WIN	—N/a	WIN	—N/a	—N/a	—N/a	OUT			
Oyster	Ohm Cocktail	—N/a	—N/a	—N/a	—N/a	—N/a	—N/a	WIN	—N/a	WIN	—N/a	—N/a	—N/a	—N/a	—N/a	OUT				
White Crow	Zani	—N/a	—N/a	—N/a	WIN	—N/a	WIN	—N/a	—N/a	—N/a	—N/a	—N/a	—N/a	—N/a	OUT					
Flower	Pui-Fai Nattapat	WIN	—N/a	—N/a	—N/a	WIN	—N/a	—N/a	—N/a	—N/a	—N/a	—N/a	—N/a	OUT						
Bolster	Ice Preechaya	—N/a	—N/a	—N/a	—N/a	—N/a	—N/a	—N/a	—N/a	—N/a	—N/a	WIN	OUT							
Coral	Nam-Cha	—N/a	—N/a	—N/a	—N/a	—N/a	—N/a	—N/a	—N/a	—N/a	WIN	—N/a	OUT							
Knight	James Ruangsak	—N/a	—N/a	—N/a	—N/a	—N/a	—N/a	—N/a	—N/a	—N/a	—N/a	OUT								
Mushroom	Tom-Hom Sakuntala	—N/a	—N/a	—N/a	—N/a	—N/a	—N/a	—N/a	—N/a	—N/a	—N/a	OUT								
Compass	Stamp Apiwat	—N/a	—N/a	—N/a	—N/a	—N/a	—N/a	—N/a	—N/a	—N/a	OUT									
Mangosteen	Tui-Tui Puttachat	—N/a	—N/a	—N/a	—N/a	—N/a	—N/a	—N/a	—N/a	—N/a	OUT									
Moose	Lula	—N/a	—N/a	—N/a	—N/a	—N/a	—N/a	—N/a	WIN	OUT										
Lion	Tui Theerapat	—N/a	—N/a	—N/a	—N/a	—N/a	—N/a	WIN	—N/a	OUT										
Longan	Leew Ajareeya	—N/a	—N/a	—N/a	—N/a	—N/a	—N/a	—N/a	OUT											
Ice	Jazz Chuanchuen	—N/a	—N/a	—N/a	—N/a	—N/a	—N/a	—N/a	OUT											
Dinosaur	Eed Pong-Lang Sa-On	—N/a	—N/a	—N/a	—N/a	—N/a	—N/a	OUT												
Rabbit	Nicole Theriault	—N/a	—N/a	—N/a	—N/a	—N/a	—N/a	OUT												
Black Swan	Joy Siriluk Pongchoke	—N/a	—N/a	—N/a	WIN	—N/a	OUT													
Spider	Golf Pitchaya	—N/a	—N/a	WIN	—N/a	—N/a	OUT													
Albino Monkey	Maew Chirasak	WIN	—N/a	—N/a	—N/a	OUT														
Pheasant	ToR Saksit	—N/a	WIN	—N/a	—N/a	OUT														
Negrito	Touch Na Takuathung	—N/a	—N/a	—N/a	OUT															
Custard Apple	Rodmay Kaneungnit	—N/a	—N/a	—N/a	OUT															
Basil	Joke So Cool	—N/a	—N/a	OUT																
Old Man	Wan Thanakirt	—N/a	—N/a	OUT																
Beauty Queen	Hai Apaporn	—N/a	OUT																	
Golden Pig	Ying Rhatha	—N/a	OUT																	
Butterfly	May Fueang-Arom	OUT																		
Devil	Nam-Pung Natrika	OUT																		

This contestant won the battle and moves on to the next round.
This contestant is safe from elimination.
This contestant is eliminated.
