= Devil Sister =

2022 Thai television series

- Official series poster
- Thai: แอ๊บร้ายให้นายไม่รัก
- Genre: Romantic comedy
- Created by: GMMTV; Keng Kwang Kang
- Based on: Beauty and The Guy (รักของนางร้าย) by ปัณณ์พิมพ์
- Directed by: Ekkasit Trakulkasemsuk Pantip Vibultham
- Starring: Metawin Opas-iamkajorn; Pechaya Wattanamontree
- Opening theme: Expect Nothing by Win Metawin
- Ending theme: HEARTLESS by Min Pechaya
- Country of origin: Thailand
- Original language: Thai
- No. of seasons: 1
- No. of episodes: 18

Production
- Production location: Thailand
- Running time: 40 minutes
- Production companies: GMMTV; Keng Kwang Kang

Original release
- Network: GMM 25
- Release: 18 April – 14 June 2022

Devil Sister (Thai: แอ๊บร้ายให้นายไม่รัก), is a feel-good romantic Thai television series about love between a girl in the devil disguise and the boy next door starring Pechaya Wattanamontree (Min) and Metawin Opas-iamkajorn (Win) based on the novel "Beauty and the Guy". Produced by GMMTV together with Keng Kwang Kang and directed by Ekkasit Trakulkasemsuk and Pantip Vibultham. It was one of the television series for 2022 showcased by GMMTV during their "BORDERLESS" event on December 1, 2021. This series officially premiered on April 18, 2022 on GMM 25, it's air every Monday and Tuesday at 8:30 P.M.

== Synopsis ==
Irin (Pechaya Wattanamontree), the it girl running Bannasorn Publishing House, is crowned "the devil" for her tempestuous and fearless demeanor. But what nobody knows is that it is all an act. The truth is Irin only puts up a mean front just so her younger sister, Inn (Kanyarat Ruangrung), can stand out and be adored by all. But no matter how well Irin puts on such a cattish act, she can never stop her younger next-door neighbor Namcha (Metawin Opas-iamkajorn) from falling in love with her. In fact, Irin and Namcha used to date when they were students, but for some reason, Irin broke things off without an explanation and devastated Namcha in the process. Namcha is now a veterinarian working in a hospital, and since he's never forgotten his first love, he's ready to do whatever it takes this time around to get back together with the love of his life. Since Irin won't believe he is still in love with her, Namcha makes it his mission to prove her wrong. Unfortunately for them, this second chance at love is somehow full of obstacles because Inn has also been in love with Namcha for a long time and is working with none other than their family's lawyer Jin (Suphakorn Sriphothong) to sabotage her sister's relationship. Jin himself, through some elaborate schemes, is working to gain the trust of both Irin and her grandfather to take care of the family. And then comes Ploychan (Kanticha Chumma), the owner of a dog farm who's helping Namcha and his hospital with an ulterior motive by using her dog, Action, as a go-between. Love should come easy for the two of them, but family, work, and even friends all seem to tear them apart. How will this love be for Irin and Namcha?

== Cast and characters ==
=== Main ===
- Pechaya Wattanamontree (Min) as Irin

The it girl who run Bannasorn Publishing House, is crowned "the devil" for her tempestuous and fearless demeanor. But what nobody knows is that it is all an act.

- Metawin Opas-iamkajorn (Win) as Namcha

Irin's younger next-door neighbor who is a veterinarian.

=== Supporting ===
- Kanyarat Ruangrung (Piploy) as Inn

Irin's younger sister who in love with Namcha for a long time

- Suphakorn Sriphothong (Podd) as Jin

Irin's family lawyer

- Ploi Horwang (Ploy) as Namtan

Namcha's older sister and Irin's friend.

- Phatchatorn Thanawat (Ployphach) as Paeng

Irin's best friend.

- Kanticha Chumma (Ticha) as Ployjan

Owner of a dog farm who's helping Namcha and his hospital.

- Nirut Sirijanya (Nhing) as Anon

Irin and Inn's grandfather

- Apasiri Nitibhon (Um) as Prapha

Namcha's mother

- Phollawat Manuprasert (Tom) as Chanin

Namcha's father

== Soundtracks ==
Song title	Artist	Composer	Notes	Ref.
ไม่คาดหวัง ไม่ผิดหวัง (Expect Nothing)	Win Metawin	Written & Composed by Anuroth Ketlekha (Third) of Tilly Birds	Opening Theme	
HEARTLESS	Min Pechaya	Written & Composed by KANGSOMKS	Ending Theme	

== Production ==
GMMTV's first attempt at adapting Beauty and the Guy was announced in October 2019. It was titled Devil Sister (รักของนางร้าย). However, in September 2020, GMMTV revealed that Devil Sister was cancelled due to the COVID-19 pandemic. GMMTV ultimately decided to revive the project with an entirely new cast, making the official announcement at the "Borderless" event on December 1, 2021.

== Reception ==
The first episode of Devil Sister was trending on Twitter in 8 countries around the world, it's trending number 1 in Thailand, Indonesia, Philippines and Vietnam. Trending number 2 Worldwide, Singapore and Malaysia. Number 16 in South Korea and number 38 in Mexico. The series has gained significant attention and reached the top spot in the Thai series category on Youku, a popular Chinese video hosting and streaming platform that offers Chinese-language dramas, variety shows and movies.

=== Average TV viewership ratings ===
- the blue number represents the lowest ratings and the red number represents the highest ratings.

==== GMM25 ====
Episode No.	Episode title	Broadcast date	Average audience share Nielsen Thailand	Ref.
1	Devil Sister EP 1	April 18, 2022	0.138%	
2	Devil Sister EP 2	April 19, 2022	0.077%	
3	Devil Sister EP 3	April 25, 2022	0.088%	
4	Devil Sister EP 4	April 26, 2022	0.089%	
5	Devil Sister EP 5	May 2, 2022	0.098%	
6	Devil Sister EP 6	May 3, 2022	0.112%	
7	Devil Sister EP 7	May 9, 2022	0.117%	
8	Devil Sister EP 8	May 10, 2022	0.093%	
9	Devil Sister EP 9	May 16, 2022	0.103%	
10	Devil Sister EP 10	May 17, 2022	0.091%	
11	Devil Sister EP 11	May 23, 2022	0.085%	
12	Devil Sister EP 12	May 24, 2022	0.040%	
—	Behind the scene of Devil Sister	May 25, 2022	0.065%	
13	Devil Sister EP 13	May 30, 2022	0.058%	
14	Devil Sister EP 14	May 31, 2022	0.116%	
15	Devil Sister EP 15	June 6, 2022	0.070%	
16	Devil Sister EP 16	June 7, 2022	0.110%	
17	Devil Sister EP 17	June 13, 2022	0.134%	
18	Devil Sister EP Final EP	June 14, 2022	0.145%	
Average		0,098%		—

==== GMA-7 ====
No.	Broadcast date	Average audience share Nielsen Philippines	Ref.
1	July 24, 2023	2.0%	
2	July 25, 2023	1.7%	
3	July 26, 2023	1.9%	
4	July 27, 2023	2.0%	
5	July 28, 2023	2.3%	
6	July 31, 2023	2.0%	
7	August 1, 2023	2.4%	
8	August 2, 2023	2.1%	
9	August 3, 2023	2.5%	
10	August 4, 2023	2.0%	
11	August 7, 2023	2.9%	
12	August 8, 2023	2.3%	
13	August 9, 2023	2.0%	
14	August 10, 2023	2.9%	
15	August 11, 2023	2.1%	
16	August 14, 2023	2.0%	
17	August 15, 2023	2.2%	
18	August 16, 2023	2.0%	
19	August 17, 2023	2.1%	
20	August 18, 2023	2.0%	
21	August 21, 2023	2.4%	
22	August 22, 2023	2.9%	
23	August 23, 2023	2.0%	
24	August 24, 2023	2.3%	
25	August 25, 2023	2.2%	
26	August 28, 2023	2.9%	
27	August 29, 2023	3.0%	
28	August 30, 2023	1.8%	
29	August 31, 2023	2.0%	
30	September 1, 2023	2.3%	
31	September 4, 2023	3.0%	
32	September 5, 2023	2.8%	
33	September 6, 2023	2.4%	
34	September 7, 2023	2.4%	
35	September 8, 2023	2.8%	
Average		2.24%	—
