= The iCon Group case =

2024 controversy in Thailand

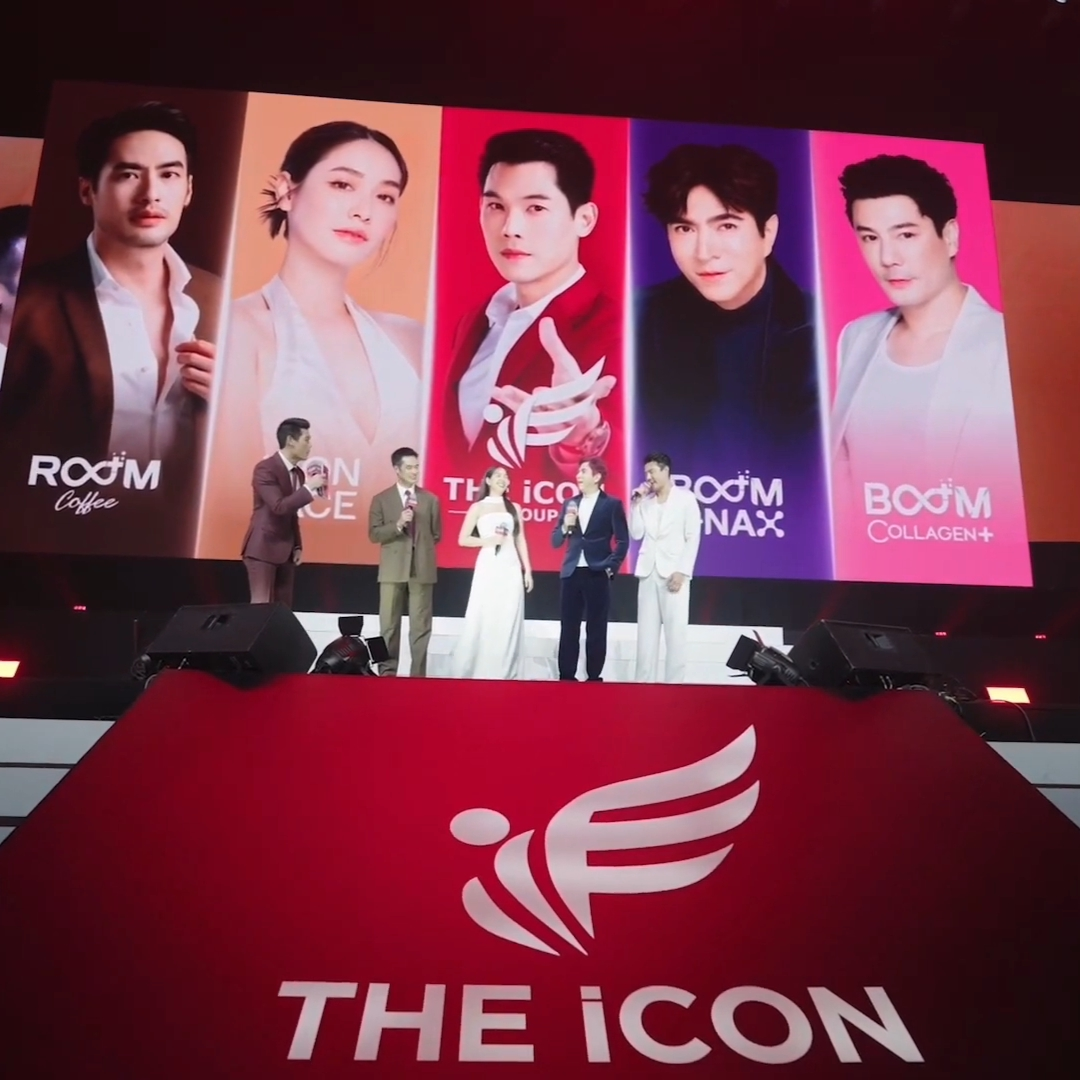
- iCon EVOLUTION EXPO on 19 December 2023
- Date: 1 June 2018 – 7 October 2024
- Perpetrators: iCon Group Co., Ltd.
- Arrests: 18
- Victims: >2,170

The iCon Group case involves allegations against the iCon Group Company Limited of defrauding the public by enticing them to invest, but ultimately failing to fulfil their promises. This issue was first brought to public attention by Kanchai Kamnerdploy, a news anchor for Channel 3 HD, in early October 2024. As of 18 October 2024, more than 2,170 victims have filed complaints, with total damages exceeding ฿841 million (approx. €24M).

The case is linked to several top Thai actors and celebrities. On 16 October 2024, a court issued arrest warrants for 18 suspects involved in this case, and all of them were apprehended on the same day. Among the arrested individuals were Yuranunt Pamornmontri, Pechaya Wattanamontree, and Kan Kantathavorn. All three had their lawyers file for temporary release on bail, but the criminal court denied the requests. Furthermore, the court also refused to grant bail to the remaining defendants in this case. Following the incident, several businesses have issued statements clarifying that they are not affiliated with the iCon Group. Additionally, the Consumer Protection Board is considering revoking the awards previously given to the company. However, television dramas featuring the defendants in this case will continue to air as scheduled. The Anti-Money Laundering Office (Amlo) has seized assets valued at approximately ฿125 million (approx. €3.5M) from the iCon Group.

== Background ==
The iCon Group Co., Ltd., founded by Waratphol Waratvorakul, was incorporated on 1 June 2018, with a registered capital of ฿1 million (approx. €28000). Headquartered in Ram Inthra, the company specialises in the distribution of health and beauty products. Within its first five years of operation, iCon Group achieved a remarkable turnover of over ฿10 billion (approx. €280M), with an astonishing 50% of this revenue generated in 2021 alone.

To achieve such rapid growth, iCon Group employed a multi-faceted sales strategy. This included a direct selling model, where products were distributed through a network of independent distributors who did not need to hold inventory. The company also provided comprehensive online sales training for distributors and interested individuals. Moreover, iCon Group strategically leveraged celebrities and influencers to endorse its products and enhance brand recognition.

== Incident ==
On 7 October 2024, Kanchai Kamnerdploy reported on a news program about a well-known multi-level marketing company that had enlisted prominent Thai celebrities to promote investment opportunities. The company allegedly lured people into investing but failed to deliver on their promises. According to Kanchai, this scheme has been ongoing since 5 October.

Kanchai had spoken with victims of the scam and gathered information about the company's practices. On 8 October, he posted a message on social media stating that the company had begun threatening individuals and was prioritising the protection of its celebrity endorsers over the victims. Following Kanchai's reports, more victims came forward to share their experiences with the fraudulent scheme. One notable victim was Christopher Benjakul, a former actor who had been involved in the accident.

The iCon Group founder initially denied these claims, stating that the company had always operated ethically. However, under public pressure, he later admitted to wrongdoing, apologised to the victims, and pledged to take full responsibility. He also announced that The iCon Group would no longer recruit new distributors.

== Aftermath ==
On 9 October, Sam Yuranant, the research director, denied any involvement in the company's operations, stating that Voratpol was the sole director. However, he expressed willingness to cooperate with law enforcement.

While the Consumer Protection Board (CPB) planned to summon the celebrities involved for questioning, The iCon Group issued a statement on 10 October, claiming that the three were not authorised signatories or shareholders.

On 11 October, Pakorn Chatborirak, a presenter for The iCon Group, clarified his role, stating that he was merely a spokesperson and not involved in the company's management.

On the same day, Pechaya Wattanamontree announced the termination of all her contracts with The iCon Group, stating that she "chose to stand with the people".

On 12 October, Kan Kantathavorn, a marketing director and TV host, announced a temporary suspension of his hosting duties on 10 October in light of the allegations.

=== Investigation and arrest ===
Following the exposé of The iCon Group's fraudulent investment scheme, Thai authorities launched a comprehensive investigation. On 9 October 2024, the Royal Thai Police Commissioner Kittirat Panpetch assigned Police Lieutenant General Akkaradech Pimolsri to oversee the case and ordered the Consumer Protection Division (CPD) to establish a complaint centre for victims. Within days, the police announced their intention to seek arrest warrants for key figures involved in the scam, citing violations of the Emergency Decree on the Borrowing of Money to Defraud the Public and money laundering laws.

On 15 October Navy Lieutenant Colonel Thanakrit Jitariyarat, Deputy Minister of Public Health, along with Air Chief Marshal Dr. Itthiphol Kanacharoen, Secretary-General of the Medical Council, and Dr. Phanuwatt Pankaet, Director-General of the Department of Health Service Support, filed a complaint with the CPD to take legal action against Thananon Hiranyachaiworn, also known as "Doctor Ek," a medical professional associated with The iCon Group, after the Medical Council confirmed that there was no record of him in the medical system.

On 16 October, the Department of Special Investigation (DSI) presented evidence to the Criminal Court and secured arrest warrants for all 18 suspects involved in the iCon Group case. The suspects were charged with fraud under the Criminal Code and for inputting false information into a computer system in violation of the amended Computer Crime Act B.E. 2550 (2007). The court approved all 18 arrest warrants, and later that day, the DSI apprehended Waratphol while he was giving a statement at the CPB. All 18 suspects were arrested that same day.

On the same day, Thai authorities seized a 63-rai plot of land owned by The iCon Group, located in Pathum Thani Province, valued at over ฿1 billion (approx. €28M). This land was intended for a mixed-use development project called "The iCon City".

The seizure is part of an ongoing investigation into the company's fraudulent activities. Authorities suspect that The iCon Group used the land purchase to launder money obtained through its investment scams. Additionally, the DSI confiscated various assets belonging to the suspects involved in the case, including luxury vehicles, cash, electronics, branded goods, and jewellery, with a total estimated value exceeding ฿100 million (approx. €2.8M).

The Royal Thai Police has issued an order to appoint a committee to investigate Police Colonel Somkid Sawisai, Deputy Commander of the Saraburi Provincial Police, regarding his alleged involvement in what the media has dubbed the "Boss Police" case. Subsequently, the Crime Suppression Division police arrested Kritsanong Suwannawong, the leader of the Suvarnabhumi Party. Later, on 22 November 2024, Ekkapop Lueangprasert surrendered himself due to an arrest warrant issued against him.

On 8 January 2025, Ronarong Phoolpipat, Secretary-General of the Office of the Consumer Protection Board (OCPB), in his capacity as the registrar under the Direct Selling and Direct Marketing Act (2002), issued an order to revoke the business registration of The iCon Group for operating a direct marketing business. Evidence revealed that victims were unable to make direct payments to purchase products through The iCon Group's website. This indicated that the company was not focused on selling products to consumers but rather emphasised recruiting new members through existing members to gain returns, which constitutes a violation of Section 19 of the Direct Selling and Direct Marketing Act (2002). The revocation is effective retroactively from 7 January 2025.

=== Phra Methee Wachirodom ===
A scandal erupted in Thailand involving a prominent Buddhist monk, Phra Methee Wachirodom, and his alleged ties to The iCon Group. On 11 October, a video surfaced showing the monk preaching to executives of The iCon Group. Despite initial claims of innocence, Phra Methee Wachirodom later admitted to receiving regular donations from the company and providing sermons. The allegations against the monk deepened when lawyer Decha Kittivitayanun published evidence of a donation of ฿1 million (approx. €28000) from The iCon Group to Phra Methee Wachirodom.

In response to the growing public outcry, Amnuayporn Maneewan filed a complaint against Phra Methee Wachirodom, accusing him of aiding and abetting fraud. While the government refrained from direct intervention, the matter was referred to the Supreme Sangha Council, the highest religious authority in Thailand. Some argue that Phra Methee Wachirodom's actions may not constitute a criminal offence, drawing parallels to celebrities who endorse products without being directly involved in a company's operations.

== Response ==
The OCPB faced criticism after it was revealed that they had previously awarded a trophy to The iCon Group. Following the company's involvement in a significant investment scam, the OCPB came under pressure to take action. On 10 October, Jiraporn Sindhuprai, the OCPB Chairperson and Minister Attached to the Prime Minister's Office, ordered the agency to investigate the allegations and accept complaints from victims. She directed the OCPB to work with other government agencies, including the Department of Special Investigation, the Anti-Money Laundering Commission, and the Royal Thai Police, to carry out a thorough investigation. If The iCon Group is found guilty of any misconduct, the OCPB has committed to revoking the trophy that was previously awarded.

On 10 October, the Direct Selling Association of Thailand issued a statement clarifying that the iCon Group is not a member of the association. The statement also provided a detailed explanation of the nine characteristics of legitimate direct selling businesses.

On 16 October, Iconsiam issued a statement clarifying that they have no affiliation with the iCon Group.

On the same day, Workpoint Entertainment announced the termination of its contract with Kan Kantathavorn.

On 17 October, Channel 7HD released a statement stating that a former executive of the channel, who was involved in the iCon Group had resigned on 10 December 2022. The company emphasised that this was a personal matter and has no connection to Channel 7HD.

On the same day, Takonkiet Viravan, CEO of The One Enterprise (ONEE) and director of Channel One 31, announced that the airing of the drama series Game Rak Patihan would continue, despite the involvement of Min Pechaya and Sam Yuranunt in the controversy. He explained that this decision was made to prevent negatively impacting others involved in the production and because he believes viewers can differentiate between the drama and the actors' real lives.
