= Matthew Deane (actor) =

Thai-Australian actor and TV personality

- แม้ทธิว พอล ดีน
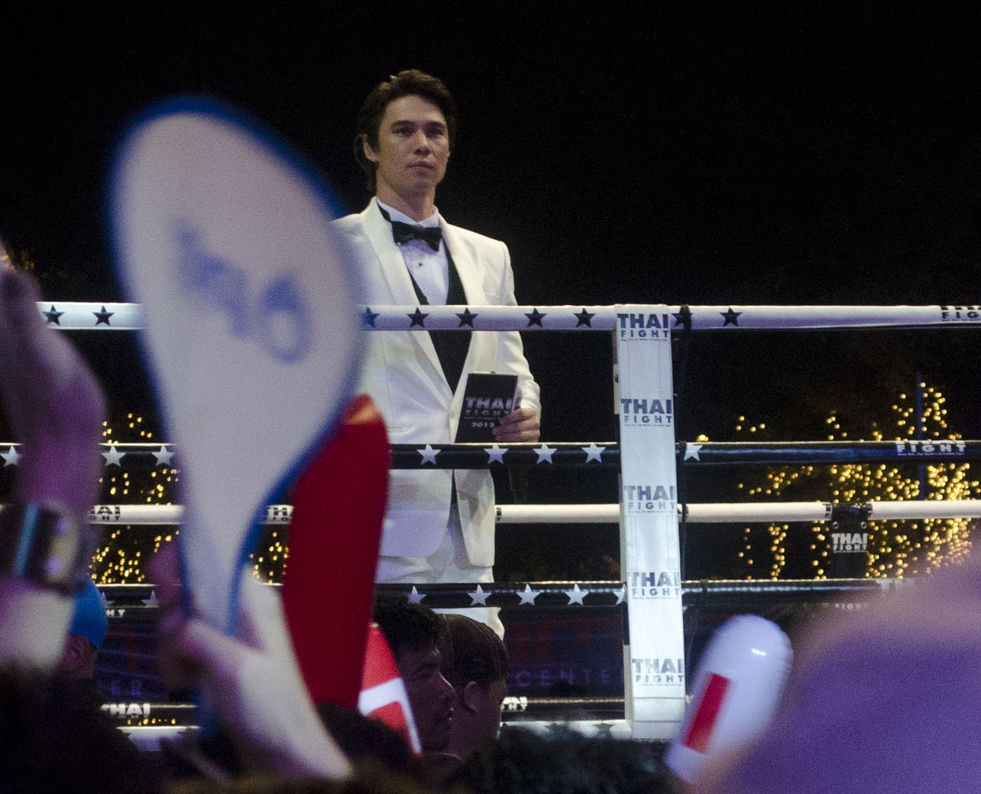
- Deane in 2012
- Born: Matthew Paul Deane; 29 August 1978 (age 48); Cairns, Australia
- Education: Rangsit University
- Occupations: Celebrity; Model; Singer; TV host; YouTuber
- Years active: 1996–present
- Spouse: Lydia Sarunrat Deane (m. 2015)

Matthew Paul Deane (Thai: แม้ทธิว พอล ดีน; born 29 August 1978) is a Thai-Australian singer, model, actor and television presenter.

== Early life and education ==
Deane was born on 29 August 1978, to an Australian father, Christopher Deane, and a Thai Chinese mother, Songsri Chanthavanij. He graduated from Cairns State High School and Rangsit University.

== Career ==
Deane started an entertainment career in 1996 as a singer under GMM Grammy, debuted an album "Code Love", and switched to RS Public Company Limited in 2000 with a successful recorded album "Matthew Mania." He was a VJ in MTV Thailand and began acting in 2009. He hosted a Thai boxing reality show Thai Fight from 2010 to 2015.

== Personal life ==
Deane and Lydia Sarunrat, a Thai R&B singer, got married in 2015. The couple have three children together.

On March 13, 2020, Deane announced that he had tested positive for COVID-19. He and his wife were admitted to Bumrungrad International Hospital for treatment and was discharged on April 18, 2020.

== Filmography ==
=== Film ===
Year	Title	Role	Note	Reference
20			Club fighters	
20			Club fighters	

=== Series ===
In 2021, Deane appeared in the Netflix series Sleepless Society: Nyctophobia playing 'Pete', the estranged husband of a grief-stricken woman who struggles to find peace until a mysterious boy appears, claiming to be her reincarnated son.

=== Master of Ceremony: MC ON TV ===
Year	Thai title	Title	Network	Notes	With
2005–2007	Pop-up Live		Channel 5		
2010–2015	ไทยไฟต์	Thai Fight	Channel 3		
2016–2017	SUPER MUAY THAI ไฟต์ถล่มโลก		Workpoint TV		
2017–2018	เลขอวดกรรม		Workpoint TV		
2018 –	Muay Thai Super Champ		Channel 8		
2019 –	Oh My Baby EP.1		YouTube:Lydia Sarunrat Deane		
2019 –	DAILY DEANES EP.1		YouTube:Lydia Sarunrat Deane		
2021 –	ร้องข้ามรุ่น		Thairath TV		

=== Advertising ===
Year	Thai title	Title	Notes	With
2020	นมกล่องตราแอนลีน			
2020	ผ้าอ้อมเด็กโคโดโมะ			
2020	เนื้อหมู Cheeva Pork	Cheeva Pork		
2020	สีเบเยอร์	Beger Shield Air Fresk Anti-Virus		
2020	อิชิตัน วิตามิน วอเตอร์	ICHITAN VITAMIN WOTOR		
2021	เจ้าสัว ข้าวตังหน้าหมูหยองพริกเผา			
2021	แชมพูเหลวโคโดโมะ			
2021	ฮาร์ปิค ผลิตภัณฑ์ทําความสะอาดห้องน้ำ	Harpic		
