= Lydia Sarunrat Deane =

Thai actress, singer and host (born 1987)

- ศรัณย์รัชต์ วิสุทธิธาดา
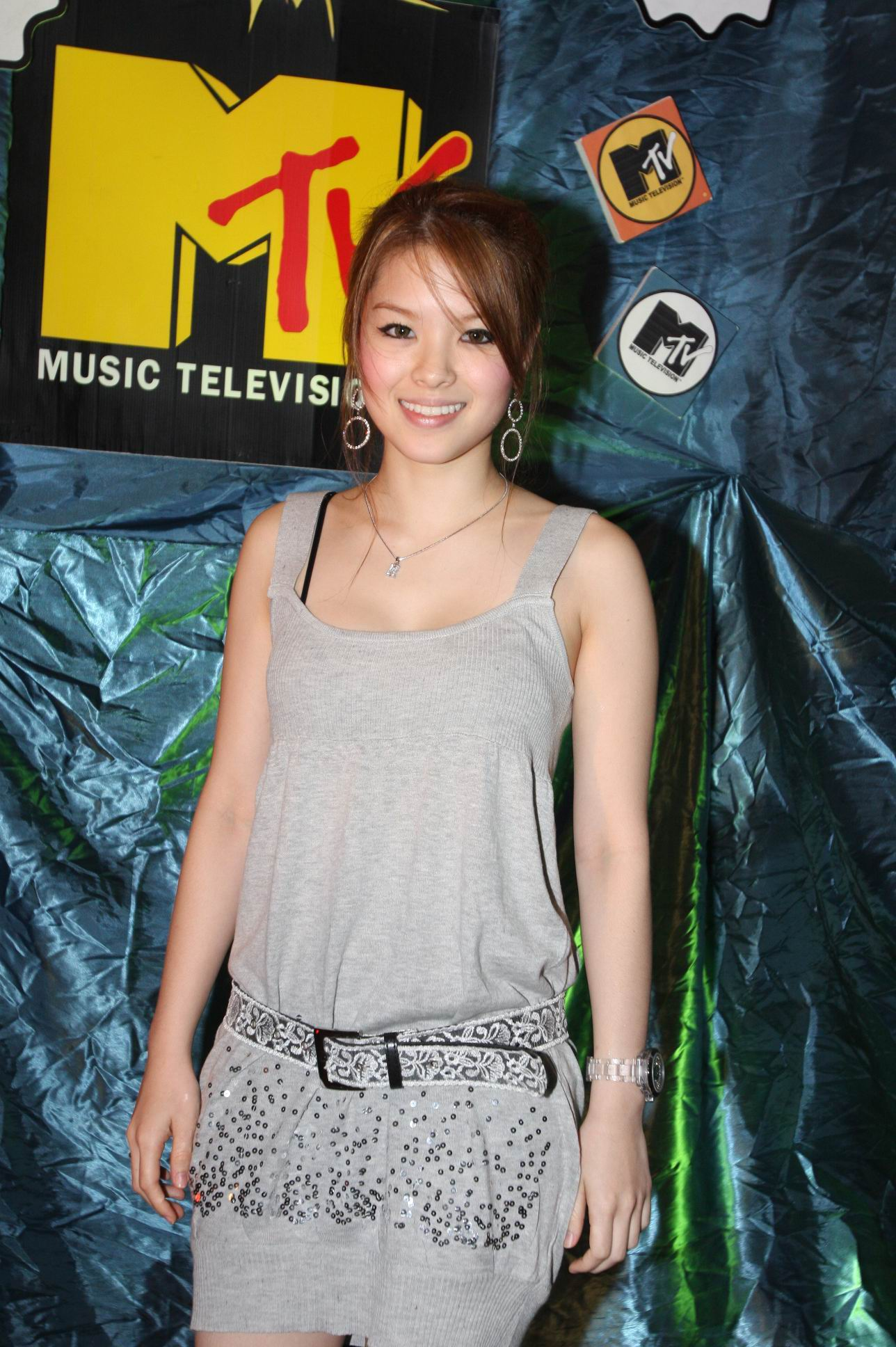
- Lydia at MTV Thailand 6th Anniversary (2007)
- Born: Sarunrat Visutthithada; July 7, 1987 (age 39); Bangkok, Thailand
- Occupations: Actress; singer; TV host; YouTuber
- Years active: 2005–present
- Spouse: Matthew Paul Deane (m. 2015)
- Children: 3
- Musical career
- Genres: Pop; R&B
- Instrument: Vocals
- Labels: RS; Polyplus; Sugar Mama Records
- Website: Official website

Lydia Sarunrat Deane, born Sarunrat Visutthithada (Thai: ศรัณย์รัชต์ วิสุทธิธาดา, RTGS: Saranrat Wisutthithada; born 7 July 1987), is a Thai singer. She debuted in 2005 with her album Lydia. Her music became a hit across Thailand. Her single "Wang Leaw Chuay Toh Klub" reached number one for consecutive weeks after its release. Deemed the "Princess of R&B" music in Thailand, Lydia is one of the country's top performing female artists to date.

== Early life ==
Lydia was born on July 7, 1987 in Bangkok, Thailand. Lydia began vocal training at age 10 in pursuit of her music career. She attended the International School of Bangkok Lydia accepted a spot in Northwestern University's Class of 2009 majoring in Biotechnology but later diverted from academics to focus on her music career.

== Career ==
Lydia debuted her eponymous album in the summer of 2005. She became an R&B sensation across Thailand that earned her the title the "Princess of R&B". Her music consistently landed on the top of the charts. Her first hit single was number one for nine consecutive weeks.

In addition to her music career, Lydia began acting. Her first TV series was Rabum Duang Dao. She starred in Sanaeha Sunya Kaen (2014) and Peun Ruk Peun Rissaya (2015).

As the face of Reebok, Lydia is a health and fitness influencer.

Lydia also works as a model. She has graced the covers of Numéro, Women's Health, Shape, Volume, and many more. As an ambassador for Reebok, Lydia advocates for healthy living and following a fitness regime. She uses her platform and influence in order to promote and inspire body positivity, healthiness, and activeness.

Lydia joined by Celebrity Car Wars on History Channel has celebrities from all over Asia take on week driving challenges. Lydia and Matthew represented Thailand on season 3 and joined as the first married couple on the show.

Lydia was winner of The Mask Singer (Thai season 2) second season; Thai singing competition where established singers, actors, and celebrities compete while wearing a costume to mask their identities before unveiling at the end of the show, Lydia was the cohost of Bolt of Talent on Star World Asia an original series that documents award-winning American songwriter and pop culture icon Michael Bolton in search for undiscovered gifted singers across Asia, Lydia acted in Channel 3 Thailand's popular Channel 3 series, having first starred in Rabum Duang Dao in 2010.

Lydia has an HBO Asia Originals reality show called Deane’s Dynasty. It is an 8-episode reality series offering a glimpse into the lives of one of Thailand’s most prominent celebrity families, Lydia and Matthew Deane (actor), along with their circle of well-known friends. Together, they navigate the challenges and triumphs that fame, family, and career bring.

== Discography ==
=== Albums and singles ===
- 2005 Album Lydia, Thank You Edition Debut Album: Lydia - Lydia
- 2006 Special Album: Dreams // A Little Dream Project
- 2007 Album: All of My Heart, Album: Inside Out, OST: Ruk Na 24 Chua Mong, OST: Someday
- 2008 Album: Moving On, Album: Fabulous, Single: Tang Cheewit "All My Life"
- 2012 Album: In Love With Lydia, OST: Tham Hua Jai Gee Krung Dtuap Meuam Derm "My Heart Feels the Same", Single: Tur Mai Yom Ploi Chan Mai Yorm Pai "You won't Let Me Go, I wan't Go"
- 2013 Single: Baby Don't Stop - Thitanium ft.Lydia
- 2014 OST: Morng Arai "Whatcha Lookin At", OST: Khong Pen Wan Tee Chan Rak Ter "The Day I Fall For You", OST: Sia Jai Mai Yorm Sia Tur "Lose Myself, Will Not Lose You", OST: Kwam Lub Khong Kwan Rak "Secret of Love"
- 2015 OST: Sed Jai "Small Part of Your Heart", OST: Kid Tung "Miss You"
- 2017 OST: Rak Mee Jing Rue Plao "Does True Love Exist"
- 2018 Single: Dead End, Single: Attitude, Single: I'm a hot girl, Single: Sawasdee Krub, OST: Pieng Sob ta "Looking in your Eyes"
- 2019 Single Sugar Mama
- 2020 Single: Bad Habits
- 2021 OST: Sood Tai "Finally"
- 2022 OST: Ya Ma Rak Chan Loey "Don't Love Me"
- 2023 OST: Sa Urn "Cry"

== Filmography ==
=== TV dramas ===
- Rabum Duang Dao_ ระบำดวงดาว
- Sanaeha Sunya Kaen_ เสน่หาสัญญาแค้น
- Ruk Peun Rissaya เพื่อนรักเพื่อนริษยา
- Tur Rak Kao Lae Rak Khong Rao_รักเธอ รักเขา และรักของเรา

=== Advertising ===
Thai title	Title	Notes	With
นมกล่องตราแอนลีน	Anlene		
ผ้าอ้อมเด็ก	Merries		
แชมพูเด็ก	Kodomo		
นมผงเด็ก	Meiji EZCube		
ยาลดไข้สำหรับเด็ก	Tempra		
เซรั่มบำรุงผิวหน้า	BIOTHERM		
เนื้อหมู Cheeva Pork	U Farm		
สีเบเยอร์	Beger Shield Air Fresk Anti-Virus		
อิชิตัน วิตามิน วอเตอร์	ICHITAN VITAMIN WATER		
พอนด์ส เอจ มิราเคิล	POND's AGE MIRACLE		
สบู่ Protex	Soap Protex		
เจ้าสัว ข้าวตังหน้าหมูหยองพริกเผา	Chao Sua		

=== Music video appearances ===
- 2004: "Yuen Pid Tee" (ยืนผิดที่) - Aline bass (RS/YouTube:rsfriends) with ภาณุพงศ์ วราเอกศิริ (ซาหริ่ม)
- 2013: "Roo (I Realized)" - Bee Peerapat

== Awards and nominations ==
- Season Awards - won Best Female Artist (2005)
- MTV Asia Awards - nominated for Most Popular Artist (2005)
- Seed Awards - won Best Female Artist (2005)
- Seventeen Music Choice Awards - won Best Female Artist (2006–2007)
- Zen Awards - won Most Stylish Woman and Popular (2008)
