= The Mask Singer (Thai TV series) season 1 =

The Mask Singer
- Season 1
- Presented by: Kan Kantathavorn
- No. of episodes: 20

Release
- Original network: Workpoint TV
- Original release: 6 October 2016 – 30 March 2017

Season chronology
- Next → Season 2

The Mask Singer (Thai: The Mask Singer หน้ากากนักร้อง) is a Thai singing competition program presented by Kan Kantathavorn. It aired on Workpoint TV every Thursday at 20:00 from 6 October 2016 to 30 March 2017.

== Panel of Judges ==
No.	Name	Profession
1	Nitipong Hornark	Songwriter
2	Maneenuch Samatsut	Singing Teacher
3	Jakkawal Saothongyuttitum	Music Producer
4	Yuttana Boon-Orm	Music Company Executive
5	Siriporn Yuyod	Comedian
6	Kiattisak Udomnak	MC
7	Thanawat Prasittisomporn	MC
8	Jirasak Parnphum	Singer
9	Phatsakorn Palaboon	Actress
10	Nalin Hohler	Actress, Dancer
11	Panthila Fuklin	Actress
12	Seo Ji-yeon	Actress
13	Wattana Weerayawattana	Songwriter
14	Nattawut Srimork	Rapper, Songwriter
15	Phattarawadee Pinthong	Comedian
16	Janet Kiew	Singer, Comedian
17	Jatupol Chompunit	Lecturer
18	Nutpavin Kulkunyadee	DJ
19	Deejai Deedeedee	Actress
20	Ornnapa Kritsadee	Beauty Expert, MC
21	Saksit Vejsupaporn	Singer, Pianist
22	Kapol Thongphup	DJ, MC
23	Apissada Kueakhongkha	Actress, Model
24	Boriboon Chanrueng	Actor
25	Bumror Phong-Intharakul	Director, Comedian
26	Thanachaphan Booranacheewawilai	DJ
27	Sornram Teppitak	Actor
28	Jaroenporn Ornlamai	Actor
29	Tikamporn Rittha-Apinan	Actress
30	Primrata Dech-Udom	Actress
31	Nida Patcharaweeraphong	Actress

== First round ==
=== Group A ===
Order	Episode	Stage Name	Song	Identity	Profession	Result
1	EP.1	Phoenix	หัวใจไม่อยู่กับตัว	Ja-Ja Primrata	Actress	Eliminated
1	EP.1	Pony	Hurt	Undisclosed		Advanced to Semi-Final
2	EP.1	One-eyed Cat	กัญชา	Sumet Ong-Art	Singer, Actor	Eliminated
2	EP.1	Pork Chili Dip	เธอ	Undisclosed		Advanced to Semi-Final
3	EP.3	Bell	ไม้ขีดไฟกับดอกทานตะวัน	Undisclosed		Advanced to Semi-Final
3	EP.3	Drum Set	แกล้ง	Nick Ronnavee	Singer, Actor	Eliminated
4	EP.3	Tuxedo	ไม่รักดี	Jaggaboom	Comedian	Eliminated
4	EP.3	Durian	If I Ain't Got You	Undisclosed		Advanced to Semi-Final

=== Group B ===
Order	Episode	Stage Name	Song	Identity	Profession	Result
1	EP.2	Black Crow	Endless Rain	Undisclosed		Advanced to Semi-Final
1	EP.2	Nurse	คุกเข่า	Tangmo Nida	Actress	Eliminated
2	EP.2	Pad Thai	กินข้าวกับน้ำพริก	Undisclosed		Advanced to Semi-Final
2	EP.2	Young Girl	Nessun Dorma	Po Yokee Playboy	Singer, Musician	Eliminated
3	EP.5	Owl	Don't Speak	Gene Kasidit	Singer	Eliminated
3	EP.5	Boar	ขอเพียงที่พักใจ	Undisclosed		Advanced to Semi-Final
4	EP.5	Bull	บัวช้ำน้ำขุ่น	Audy	Singer	Eliminated
4	EP.5	Angel	ทำไมต้องเธอ	Undisclosed		Advanced to Semi-Final

=== Group C ===
Order	Episode	Stage Name	Song	Identity	Profession	Result
1	EP.6	Princess	Seal Our Fate	Tak Siriporn	Singer, Comedian	Eliminated
1	EP.6	Drone	When I Was Your Man	Undisclosed		Advanced to Semi-Final
2	EP.6	Dragon	One Moment In Time	Undisclosed		Advanced to Semi-Final
2	EP.6	Diver	My Generation	Kwang AB Normal	Singer	Eliminated
3	EP.7	Egyptian	I Have Nothing	Undisclosed		Advanced to Semi-Final
3	EP.7	Witch	เสียใจได้ยินไหม	Sunaree Ratchasrima	Singer	Eliminated
4	EP.7	Diamond	I Don't Want To Miss A Thing	Undisclosed		Advanced to Semi-Final
4	EP.7	Prince	ทางของฝุ่น	Dao Khammin	Comedian	Eliminated

=== Group D ===
Order	Episode	Stage Name	Song	Identity	Profession	Result
1	EP.12	Geisha	All By Myself	Undisclosed		Advanced to Semi-Final
1	EP.12	Eagle	California Dreamin'	Doong Patee	Nok Air CEO	Eliminated
2	EP.12	Hanbok	ไม่ต้องรู้ว่าเราคบกันแบบไหน	Pookie Paveenut	Actress	Eliminated
2	EP.12	Octopus	Halo	Undisclosed		Advanced to Semi-Final
3	EP.13	Giantess	พูดตรง ๆ	Se-Na Hoy	Presenter	Eliminated
3	EP.13	Kangaroo	Love On Top	Undisclosed		Advanced to Semi-Final
4	EP.13	Chinese Girl	Safe & Sound	Undisclosed		Advanced to Semi-Final
4	EP.13	Warrior	Lost Stars	Jack Chaloempol	Actor, Presenter	Eliminated

== Semi-final ==
=== Group A ===
Order	Episode	Stage Name	Song	Identity	Profession	Result
1	EP.4	Pork Chili Dip	พูดไม่คิด	Songkarn Rangsan	Singer	Eliminated
1	EP.4	Pony	Sway	Undisclosed		Advanced to Final
2	EP.4	Bell	All of Me	Arm Kornkan	Actor, MC, News Anchor	Eliminated
2	EP.4	Durian	มือปืน	Undisclosed		Advanced to Final

=== Group B ===
Order	Episode	Stage Name	Song	Identity	Profession	Result
1	EP.8	Black Crow	ทิ้งรักลงแม่น้ำ	Undisclosed		Advanced to Final
1	EP.8	Pad Thai	เกลียดคนสวย	Som Sheng Sam Cha	Comedian	Eliminated
2	EP.8	Boar	Rolling in the Deep	Undisclosed		Advanced to Final
2	EP.8	Angel	เพียงชายคนนี้ (ไม่ใช่ผู้วิเศษ)	Belle Nuntita	Singer	Eliminated

=== Group C ===
Order	Episode	Stage Name	Song	Identity	Profession	Result
1	EP.9	Egyptian	Domino	Nancy Nunthaporn	Singer	Eliminated
1	EP.9	Drone	เพื่อนรัก	Undisclosed		Advanced to Final
2	EP.9	Diamond	Thinking Out Loud	Pe Mild	Singer	Eliminated
2	EP.9	Dragon	Listen	Undisclosed		Advanced to Final

=== Group D ===
Order	Episode	Stage Name	Song	Identity	Profession	Result
1	EP.14	Geisha	Hello	Chompoo Kon-Bai	Comedian	Eliminated
1	EP.14	Octopus	And I Am Telling You I'm Not Going	Undisclosed		Advanced to Final
2	EP.14	Chinese Girl	จะบอกเธอว่ารัก	Cee Chatpawee	IT Specialist	Eliminated
2	EP.14	Kangaroo	How Am I Supposed to Live Without You	Undisclosed		Advanced to Final

== Final ==
Group	Episode	Stage Name	Song	Identity	Profession	Result
A	EP.10	Pony	Without You	Pam GAIA	Singer	Eliminated
A	EP.10	Durian	Lay Me Down	Undisclosed		Advanced to Champ VS Champ
A	EP.10	Duet: ไม่รู้จักฉัน ไม่รู้จักเธอ				
B	EP.11	Black Crow	Zombie	Undisclosed		Advanced to Champ VS Champ
B	EP.11	Boar	Only Love Can Hurt Like This, สาวนาสั่งแฟน	Koi Ratchawin	Actress, Model	Eliminated
B	EP.11	Duet: ความเชื่อ				
C	EP.15	Drone	คำอธิษฐานด้วยน้ำตา	PK Piyawat	Singer, DJ, MC	Eliminated
C	EP.15	Dragon	I Surrender	Undisclosed		Advanced to Champ VS Champ
C	EP.15	Duet: Let It Be				
D	EP.16	Octopus	One Night Only	Emmy Morakot	Actress, MC	Eliminated
D	EP.16	Kangaroo	One Last Cry	Undisclosed		Advanced to Champ VS Champ
D	EP.16	Duet: Empire State of Mind				

== Champ VS Champ ==
Episode	Champ from group	Stage Name	Song	Identity	Profession	Result
EP.17	B	Black Crow	What's Up?	Undisclosed		Advanced to Champ of the Champ
EP.17	C	Dragon	The Impossible Dream	Bum Panadda	Actress, MC	Eliminated
EP.17	Duet: Bring Me to Life					
EP.18	A	Durian	Set Fire to the Rain	Undisclosed		Advanced to Champ of the Champ
EP.18	D	Kangaroo	Versace on the Floor	Peck Palitchoke	Singer	Eliminated
EP.18	Duet: Happy					
Group Song: ยินดีที่ไม่รู้จัก

== Champ of the Champ ==
Episode	Champ from group	Stage Name	Song	Identity	Profession	Result
EP.19	A	Durian	จดหมายฉบับสุดท้าย	Tom Issara	Singer	Champion
EP.19	B	Black Crow	อย่าหยุดยั้ง	Ae Jirakorn	Singer	Runner-up
EP.19	Duet: คิดถึง					

== Celebration of The Mask Champion ==
Episode	Song	Stage Name
EP.20	Uptown Funk	All the mask in this season
EP.20	แฟนจ๋า	Durian, Dragon, Witch, Geisha, Pony, Octopus
EP.20	Medley (รู้ยัง, หน่วง, พูดทำไม)	Durian
EP.20	มือปืน (Piano Version)	Durian
EP.20	7 years	Durian
EP.20	Back at One	Durian and Kangaroo
EP.20	Creep	Black Crow
EP.20	อยู่ไปไม่มีเธอ	White Crow (From Season 2)
EP.20	Grenade	Spider (From Season 2)
EP.20	You Raise Me Up	Jaguar (From Season 2)
EP.20	ขอบคุณที่รักกัน	All the mask in this season

== Elimination table ==
Contestant	Identity	Ep.1	Ep.2	Ep.3	Ep.4	Ep.5	Ep.6	Ep.7	Ep.8	Ep.9	Ep.10	Ep.11	Ep.12	Ep.13	Ep.14	Ep.15	Ep.16	Ep.17	Ep.18	Ep.19
Durian	Tom Issara	—N/a	—N/a	WIN	WIN	—N/a	—N/a	—N/a	—N/a	—N/a	WIN	—N/a	—N/a	—N/a	—N/a	—N/a	—N/a	—N/a	WIN	Champion
Black Crow	Ae Jirakorn	—N/a	WIN	—N/a	—N/a	—N/a	—N/a	—N/a	WIN	—N/a	—N/a	WIN	—N/a	—N/a	—N/a	—N/a	—N/a	WIN	—N/a	Runner-up
Kangaroo	Peck Palitchoke	—N/a	—N/a	—N/a	—N/a	—N/a	—N/a	—N/a	—N/a	—N/a	—N/a	—N/a	—N/a	WIN	WIN	—N/a	WIN	—N/a	OUT	
Dragon	Bum Panadda	—N/a	—N/a	—N/a	—N/a	—N/a	WIN	—N/a	—N/a	WIN	—N/a	—N/a	—N/a	—N/a	—N/a	WIN	—N/a	OUT		
Octopus	Emmy Morakot	—N/a	—N/a	—N/a	—N/a	—N/a	—N/a	—N/a	—N/a	—N/a	—N/a	—N/a	WIN	—N/a	WIN	—N/a	OUT			
Drone	PK Piyawat	—N/a	—N/a	—N/a	—N/a	—N/a	WIN	—N/a	—N/a	WIN	—N/a	—N/a	—N/a	—N/a	—N/a	OUT				
Chinese Girl	Cee Chatpawee	—N/a	—N/a	—N/a	—N/a	—N/a	—N/a	—N/a	—N/a	—N/a	—N/a	—N/a	—N/a	WIN	OUT					
Geisha	Chompoo Kon-Bai	—N/a	—N/a	—N/a	—N/a	—N/a	—N/a	—N/a	—N/a	—N/a	—N/a	—N/a	WIN	—N/a	OUT					
Warrior	Jack Chaloempol	—N/a	—N/a	—N/a	—N/a	—N/a	—N/a	—N/a	—N/a	—N/a	—N/a	—N/a	—N/a	OUT						
Giantess	Se-Na Hoy	—N/a	—N/a	—N/a	—N/a	—N/a	—N/a	—N/a	—N/a	—N/a	—N/a	—N/a	—N/a	OUT						
Hanbok	Pookie Paveenut	—N/a	—N/a	—N/a	—N/a	—N/a	—N/a	—N/a	—N/a	—N/a	—N/a	—N/a	OUT							
Eagle	Doong Patee	—N/a	—N/a	—N/a	—N/a	—N/a	—N/a	—N/a	—N/a	—N/a	—N/a	—N/a	OUT							
Boar	Koi Ratchawin	—N/a	—N/a	—N/a	—N/a	WIN	—N/a	—N/a	WIN	—N/a	—N/a	OUT								
Pony	Pam GAIA	WIN	—N/a	—N/a	WIN	—N/a	—N/a	—N/a	—N/a	—N/a	OUT									
Diamond	Pe Mild	—N/a	—N/a	—N/a	—N/a	—N/a	—N/a	WIN	—N/a	OUT										
Egyptian	Nancy Nunthaporn	—N/a	—N/a	—N/a	—N/a	—N/a	—N/a	WIN	—N/a	OUT										
Angel	Belle Nuntita	—N/a	—N/a	—N/a	—N/a	WIN	—N/a	—N/a	OUT											
Pad Thai	Som Sheng Sam Cha	—N/a	WIN	—N/a	—N/a	—N/a	—N/a	—N/a	OUT											
Prince	Dao Khammin	—N/a	—N/a	—N/a	—N/a	—N/a	—N/a	OUT												
Witch	Sunaree Ratchasrima	—N/a	—N/a	—N/a	—N/a	—N/a	—N/a	OUT												
Diver	Kwang AB Normal	—N/a	—N/a	—N/a	—N/a	—N/a	OUT													
Princess	Tak Siriporn	—N/a	—N/a	—N/a	—N/a	—N/a	OUT													
Bull	Audy	—N/a	—N/a	—N/a	—N/a	OUT														
Owl	Gene Kasidit	—N/a	—N/a	—N/a	—N/a	OUT														
Bell	Arm Kornkan	—N/a	—N/a	WIN	OUT															
Pork Chili Dip	Songkarn Rangsan	WIN	—N/a	—N/a	OUT															
Tuxedo	Jaggaboom	—N/a	—N/a	OUT																
Drum Set	Nick Ronnavee	—N/a	—N/a	OUT																
Young Girl	Po Yokee Playboy	—N/a	OUT																	
Nurse	Tangmo Nida	—N/a	OUT																	
One-eyed Cat	Sumet Ong-Art	OUT																		
Phoenix	Ja-Ja Primrata	OUT																		

This contestant won the battle and moves on to the next round.
This contestant lost the battle and is eliminated.

== Ratings ==
Episode	Original Airdate	Nationwide	Bangkok	Urban	Rural
1	6 October 2016	5.280	Undisclosed		
2	24 November 2016	4.6	Undisclosed		
3	1 December 2016	3.8	Undisclosed		
4	8 December 2016	4.6	Undisclosed		
5	15 December 2016	5.743	9.332	6.556	4.334
6	22 December 2016	6.0	Undisclosed		
7	29 December 2016	4.3	Undisclosed		
8	5 January 2017	7.081	10.134	6.307	6.757
9	12 January 2017	6.626	10.273	7.166	5.424
10	19 January 2017	5.1	Undisclosed		
11	26 January 2017	8.270	Undisclosed		
12	2 February 2017	8.043	10.570	9.130	7.058
13	9 February 2017	3.9	Undisclosed		
14	16 February 2017	8.290	Undisclosed		
15	23 February 2017	7.900	Undisclosed		
16	2 March 2017	8.145	11.188	9.905	6.796
17	9 March 2017	10.151	15.332	10.408	8.847
18	16 March 2017	11.021	14.719	13.112	9.250
19	23 March 2017	13.371	18.910	16.231	11.038
20	30 March 2017	12.543	15.977	14.582	11.000
Source: AGB Nielsen Media Research Thailand
