= Answer for Heaven =

2019 Thai-language television series

- Genre: Comedy
- Starring: Sunny Suwanmethanont; Kan Kantathavor; Pattarasaya Kruasuwansiri
- Country of origin: Thailand
- Original language: Thai
- No. of seasons: 1

Original release
- Network: One 31
- Release: April 18 – June 14, 2019

Answer for Heaven is a 2019 Thai language dramedy television series starring Sunny Suwanmethanont, Kan Kantathavor and Pattarasaya Kruasuwansiri.

The plot revolves around an angel Tep (Sunny Suwanmethanont) who falls to earth to investigate why humans are doing fewer good deeds. At the same time, halos are appearing around the sun at an unprecedented frequency, believed to be attributed to aliens. A crime reporter in Bangkok helps Tep with his investigation.

== Cast ==
- Sunny Suwanmethanont as Tep
- Kan Kantathavorn as Add
- Pattarasaya Kruasawan as Da
- Chayanan Manomaisantiphap as Inspector Pang

== Release ==
Answer for Heaven was released on June 27, 2019 on Netflix streaming.
