= Pechaya Wattanamontree =

Thai actress (born 1989)

- พีชญา วัฒนามนตรี
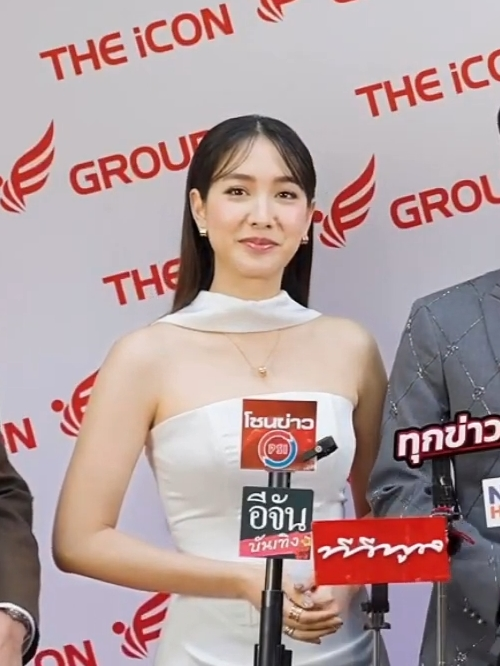
- Born: Pechaya Wattanamontree; April 28, 1989 (age 37); Nam Phong, Khon Kaen, Thailand
- Other names: Min (มิน); Minny
- Occupations: Actress; model; singer (sometime); YouTuber
- Years active: 2006–2024
- Agents: Channel 7 (2009–2020); Freelance (2020–present)
- Notable work: Plah Boo Thong (2009); Ruk Nai Marn Mek (2010); Pin Anong (2012); Yok Luerd Mungkorn (2012); Cinderella Rong Tao Tae (2013)
- Height: 1.65 m (5 ft 5 in)

Pechaya Wattanamontree (Thai: พีชญา วัฒนามนตรี; RTGS: Phichaya Watthanamontri; born 28 April 1989), nicknamed Min (Thai: มิน), is a Thai model and actress.

She has been arrested for public fraud in The iCon Group case and is detained in prison pending trial.

== Early life ==
Pechaya is a native of Nam Phong district, Khon Kaen province. She was born on 28 April 1989, as the second child of Supat Wattanamontree (former mayor of Nam Phong district) and Kanchana Wattanamontree. Her family operates a real estate business, a housing project and is a building material distributor in Khon Kaen.

Pechaya graduated from Khon Kaen University, Secondary Division where she played basketball. She received the gold medal at the Unity No. 29 Chamchuri Games. She was an exchange student at the World Experience program at Columbia Falls High School, Montana. She graduated with a bachelor's degree from the Faculty of Liberal Arts Arts Business English from Assumption University on 18 January 2014.

== Career ==
Pechaya entered the fashion industry in 2006 via the "Miss Teen Thailand" contest. She finished as 1st runner-up in the media and Miss I-Mobile. Pechaya signed with Channel 7, her first lakorn (Thai drama) was Pla Boo Thong in 2009. She then performed in Reun Son Ruk and Ruk Nai Marn Mek, Thailand's most popular drama that year.

In 2010, Pechaya received the Most Popular Star award from institutions including the Young Rising Star Award. From Siam Dara Star Award Hot Female Rising Star of the Year From Inside TV Hot Awards and the Rising Star Award From Maya Pop Vote.

On November 20, 2020, Channel 7 announced that Min decided not to renew her contract with the label. She is currently a freelance actress.

== Personal life ==
She had a relationship with businessman Pitak Spatam (Oat). On November 4, Min reveals that she has been single for over 4 months. She dated Oat Pitak for over 4 years before they broke up.

== The iCon Group case ==
Pechaya was arrested on 16 October 2024 for prosecution on charges of public fraud. She is now detained in the Central Women's Correctional Institution pending trial after her bail request was rejected by the Criminal Court on grounds of flight risk.

== Filmography ==
=== Film ===
Year	Title	Role	Notes
2010	Duay Rak (With Love)	Saifon	
2014	Kwam Lub Nang Marn Rai (The secret of devil's girl)	Bussaba	
2016	The Nursery Room 3D	Ye Zi Fei	
2019	Double Action Mission Legend Siam		
2021	Sai Hua Pai Naai Suan Kern	Pakkad	

=== Television series ===
Year	Title	Role	Network	Notes
2009	Plah Boo Thong	Auy/Ai	Channel 7	
2010	Reun Son Ruk	ML Daranij Rajasakmontritham	Channel 7	Support Role
2010	Ruk Nai Marn Mek	Valika Siriwit (Sai/NongSai)	Channel 7	
2010	Sawan Saang	OunJai	Channel 7	
2011	Bundai Dok Ruk	Krachao	Channel 7	
2011	Bo Bay	Khaopan	Channel 7	Cameo
2012	Pang Sanaeha	Siangwaan / Plaidao	Channel 7	
2012	Pin Anong	Pin	Channel 7	
2012	Yok Luerd Mungkorn	Gingmei	Channel 7	
2013	Cinderella Rong Tao Tae	Han (Goose)/ Honey	Channel 7	
2014	Lah Ruk Sut Kob Fah	Matana Kiatkumjorn (Mats)	Channel 7	
2015	Baan Sai Thong	Potjaman Pinitan/ Potjaman Sawangwong	Channel 7	
2016	Look Mai Klai Ton	Rasa Bodinthawatcha (Sa)	Channel 7	
2017	Koo Za Rod Zab	Rosirin (Rose)	Channel 7	
2018	Nang Thip	Chaofa Thipchai	Channel 7	
2019	Song Naree	Panitee [Neung] / Paniti [Song] (twins)	Channel 7	
2020	Sapai Import	Arisa (Lisa)	Channel 7	
2022	Devil Sister	Irin	GMMTV	Main Role

== Discography ==
Year	Song title	Notes
2010	สวรรค์สร้าง	with Siwat Chotchaicharin Sawan Saang OST
2010	หากเรายังรักกัน	with Channel 7 artists
2011	คนขอนแก่น	Collected artists from Khon Kaen Province
2011	บันไดดอกรัก	with Akkaphan Namart Bundai Dok Ruk OST
2012	ปางเสน่หา	with Thanapon Nimtaisuk Pang Sanaeha OST
2012	เกลียดตัวเอง	Pin Anong OST
2014	เพลงนิทรา	Lah Ruk Sut Kob Fah OST
2015	รอยเท้าพ่อ	with Channel 7 artists, a Special Project Commemorating the 88th Birthday Anniversary of His Majesty the King
2017	เป็นเธอเมื่อไหร่	with Sukollawat Kanaros Koo Za Rod Zab OST
2020	เธอทำให้ฉันไม่มีแฟน	with Supol Phuasirirak, Special Project Secre7 Room
2020	แรงดึงดูดความรัก	with Mick Tongraya Sapai Import OST
2022	ยิ่งร้ายยิ่งรัก	Devil Sister OST

=== Master of Ceremony: MC ON TV ===
Year	Thai title	Title	Network	Notes	With
2018–present	Minnie Mouth		YouTube:Pechaya Channel		

== Awards and nominations ==
Year	Awards	Category	Nominated work	Result
2006	Miss Teen Thailand	1st Runner-up	—N/a	Won
2006	Miss Teen Thailand	Media's Favorite	—N/a	Won
2006	Miss Teen Thailand	Miss I-Mobile	—N/a	Won
2010	Siam Dara Awards 2010	Best New-coming Actress	Pla Boo Thong	Won
2010	TV Inside Hot Awards 2010	Hottest Actress of the year	Pla Boo Thong	Won
2010	OK! Awards 2010	Male Heartthrob	—N/a	Nominated
2010	OK! Awards 2010	Rising Star	—N/a	Nominated
2011	Top Awards 2010	Best Rising Star	—N/a	Nominated
2011	FHM 100 Sexiest Women in the World 2011	Ranking no. 15	—N/a	Won
2011	Maya Popular Vote 2010	The Rising Star	—N/a	Won
2011	OK! Awards 2011	Male Heartthrob	—N/a	Nominated
2012	Siam Dara Stars Awards 2012	สวยทิ่มใจ	—N/a	Won
2012	Siam Dara Stars Awards 2012	Popular Vote Award (Female)	—N/a	Nominated
2012	FHM 100 Sexiest Women in the World 2012	Ranking no. 15	—N/a	Won
2012	Ganesha	Outstanding Lead Actress	Yok Luerd Mungkorn	Won
2012	Sudsapda Young & Smart Vote 2012	Popular Actress	—N/a	Won
2012	Siam Entertainment Star's Light Awards 2012	Charming Girl	—N/a	Won
2013	The 10th Kom Chad Luek Awards	Popular Actress	—N/a	Nominated
2013	Daradaily The Great Awards 2012	Lead Actress in Drama	—N/a	Nominated
2013	MThai Top Talk-About 2013	Most Mentioned Actress	—N/a	Nominated
2013	Channel 7 Sang San Awards	Couple of the Year (with Weir Sukollawat Kanarot)	Pin Anong	Won
2013	Channel 7 Sang San Awards	Best Female Lead	Pin Anong	Won
2013	Channel 7 Sang San Awards	สุดยอดนักแสดงเจ้าบทบาทหญิง	—N/a	Won
2013	Channel 7 Sang San Awards	The Audience's Favorite, Female Actress	—N/a	Nominated
2013	Channel 7 Sang San Awards	ขวัญใจ 7 สี ฝ่ายหญิง	—N/a	Nominated
2013	Mekhala Awards	Popular Female Actress	—N/a	Won
2013	Kazz Awards 2013	Popular Female Star	—N/a	Won
2013	The 4th Nataraj Award	Best Actress	Yok Luerd Mungkorn	Nominated
2013	TV Pool Star Party Awards	Charming Girl	—N/a	Won
2013	FHM 100 Sexiest Women in the World 2013	Ranking no. 34	—N/a	Won
2013	Siam Dara Stars Awards 2013	สวยทิ่มใจ	—N/a	Nominated
2013	OK! Awards 2013	Male Heartthrob	—N/a	Nominated
2013	Starlight Awards	Beautiful Smiling Girl	—N/a	Won
2014	Daradaily The Great Awards 2013	Lead Actress in Drama	—N/a	Nominated
2014	MThai Top Talk-About 2014	Most Mentioned Actress	—N/a	Nominated
2014	Kazz Awards 2014	Female Superstar of The Year	—N/a	Won
2014	Kazz Awards 2014	Popular Female Stars	—N/a	Nominated
2014	Kazz Awards 2014	Couple of the Year (with Saran Sirilak)	—N/a	Nominated
2014	Siam Dara Stars Awards 2014	Popular Female Vote	—N/a	Nominated
2014	EFM Awards 2014	Popular Star	—N/a	Nominated
2014	OK! Awards 2014	Male Heartthrob	—N/a	Nominated
2014	FHM 100 Sexiest Women in the World 2014	Ranking no. 22	—N/a	Won
2014	Royal Honours Awards	Grateful Daughter	—N/a	Won
2014	Starlight Awards	Best Hair 2014	—N/a	Won
2015	Gmember Awards 2015	Best Couple of the Year (with Weir Sukollawat Kanarot)	—N/a	Nominated
2015	Daradaily The Great Awards 2014	Lead Actress in Film	—N/a	Nominated
2015	Daradaily The Great Awards 2014	Hot Girl of the Year	—N/a	Nominated
2015	MThai Top Talk-About 2015	Most Mentioned Actress	—N/a	Nominated
2015	Maya Awards 2015	Popular Female Lead in Film	Kwam Lub Nang Marn Rai	Won
2015	Maya Awards 2015	People's Favorite Couple (with Weir Sukollawat Kanarot)	—N/a	Nominated
2015	The 30th Surasawadee Royal Award	Popular Female Lead	—N/a	Nominated
2015	Kazz Awards 2015	Favorite of The Media	—N/a	Won
2015	Kazz Awards 2015	Popular Female Stars	—N/a	Nominated
2015	Siam Dara Stars Awards 2015	Sexy Star	—N/a	Won
2015	Starlight Awards	4th Sexy Actresses	—N/a	Won
2015	Starlight Awards	นางเอกอินเตอร์	—N/a	Won
2017	Kazz Awards 2017	Super star International Award	—N/a	Won
2019	HOWE AWARDS 2019	HOWE DIVA AWARD	—N/a	Won
2019	4th Nakarat Awards	Best Actress in Leading Role	Song Naree	Won
2020	Maya Awards 2020	Outstanding Female Actress	Song Naree	Won
