= Kornkan Sutthikoses =

Thai actor

- กรกันต์ สุทธิโกเศศ
- Born: Kornkan Sutthikoses; 17 October 1988 (age 37); Thailand
- Other name: Arm
- Education: Chulalongkorn University (Faculty of Communication Arts)
- Occupation: Actor
- Height: 1.75 m (5 ft 9 in)

Kornkan Sutthikoses (Thai: กรกันต์ สุทธิโกเศศ; born 17 October 1988), nicknamed Arm, is a Thai actor. He was first runner-up for the 18th KPN Award Thailand Singing Contest 2009 and won the popular vote. He graduated from Saint Dominic School and Chulalongkorn University. He took part in The mask Singer Season 1 under Bell mask.

== Works ==
=== Music ===
- Wai Jai
- Khor Rong
- Tabakngam
- Kid Tung
- Parn La Nue
- Kem Naliga
- Chan Mai Chai – 2004

=== Television series ===
Year	Title	Channel	Role
2013	My Melody 360	Channel 9 MCOT HD	Arm Teacher
2014	Fun Fueng	One HD	Chabang Doctor
2016	Angel Destiny	True4U	Natthapong
2016	Dao Rongfa Phuphasingen	Channel 3	Guests
2017	Secret Seven	GMM 25	Gun

=== Musical ===
Year	Title	Role	Product By
2016–2017	Nithan Hinghoy The Musical	Chanalom	Toklom Television
2015	Homrong The Musical Restage	Sorn	Toklom Television
2015	Mangkorn Saladked The Musical	Puey Ungphakorn	Bank of Thailand
2014	Homrong The Musical	Sorn	Toklom Television
2013	Lerd Kattiya The Musical	Prince Sithiprawat	Scenario
2012	Reya The Musical	CK	Nation Channel
2010	The Finale	Arik	Chulalongkorn University
2009	Vimanmaya	Pongpol	Chulalongkorn University
2008	Cafe Sirong	Acha Sae-Lo	Chulalongkorn University
2008	Prainam	Tassati	Srinakharinwirot University
