= Kanchai Kamnerdploy =

Thai actor and journalist (born 1969)

- กรรชัย กำเนิดพลอย
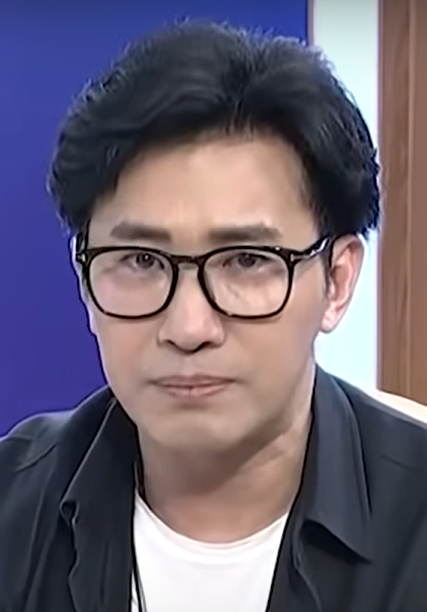
- Born: July 18, 1969 (age 57); Pom Prap Sattru Phai district, Bangkok
- Occupations: Actor, journalist, news presenter
- Years active: 1991–present
- Spouse: May Fuangarome

Phudit Kamnerdploy (Note: Thai: ภูดิท กำเนิดพลอย) (Note: Known and credited professionally as Kanchai Kamnerdploy.) (born Kanchai Kamnerdploy (Note: Thai: กรรชัย กำเนิดพลอย), 18 July 1969) is a Thai actor, news anchor, and television host. He is best known for hosting the Channel 3 talk program Hone Krasae since 2017 and for co-hosting Midday News 3HD since 2019.

== Early life and career ==
He was born on 18 July 1969, in Pom Prap Sattru Phai district, Bangkok, to Prakob and Chaweewan Kamnerdploy. His family moved to Prachuap Khiri Khan Province and Ranong Province since he was young. He graduated from Ramkhamhaeng University.

He started his entertainment career by suggestion of his friend. He started with his first soap opera, Khao Warn Hai Noo Pen Sai Lap, in 1991. After that, he performed in other TV soap operas, including Dao Ruang (1996), Monrak Luk Thung (2001), Teppabutr Salum (2002), Peesard Saenkol (2010), etc.

Apart from his career an actor, he is also a TV soap opera producer, journalist and television host. He started his television hosting career with his popular TV show Hone Krasae which has been on-air since 2017 on Channel 3 HD.

And in 2019, He took over the Midday News of the same channel from Phasit Aphinyawat.

== Personal life ==
He has been married to actress May Fuangarome since 2014 with one daughter.

== Filmography ==
=== Television ===
- 2017–present : Hone Krasae (Channel 3 HD)
- 2019–present : Channel 3 Midday News (เที่ยงวันทันเหตุการณ์) (Channel 3 HD)
- 3 Zap (Channel 3 HD)
- Kao Sai Khai (ThairathTV) (formerly)
