= Muanpair Panaboot =

Thai pop singer (born 1988)

Muanpair Panaboot เหมือนแพร พานะบุตร
- Also known as: Ging The Star
- Born: Muanpair Panaboot; January 31, 1988 (age 38); Bangkok, Thailand
- Genres: Thai pop
- Occupations: singer, host
- Years active: 2009–present
- Label: GMM Grammy
- Website: ging-fansite.com

Muanpair Panaboot (Thai: เหมือนแพร พานะบุตร; RTGS: Mueanphae Phanabut, born January 1, 1988) is a Thai pop singer who released her debut album in 2009. She is also known as Ging the Star. She was fourth in The Star 5, a popular reality show in Thailand in 2009.

== Biography ==
Muanpair was born in Bangkok. She auditioned for The Star 5 in 2009 and landed a spot as one of the final eight contestants and was fourth in the reality show.

== Discography ==
=== Singles ===
- Mai Roo
- Mee Tae Kid Teung
- Kon Mai Chai Tum A-Rai Kor Pit
- Pit Pror Rak (Ost. Ching Chang)
- Kor Trot Laew Hai Cheap Mai

=== Concerts ===
- The Star 5

=== Magazine Shooting ===
- Sut Sup Da
- Volume Magazine
- Kazz

=== Host ===
- Entertainment Update

== See also ==
- The Star
- GMM Grammy
