= Kan Kantathavorn =

Thai actor and host (born 1985)

- กันต์ กันตถาวร
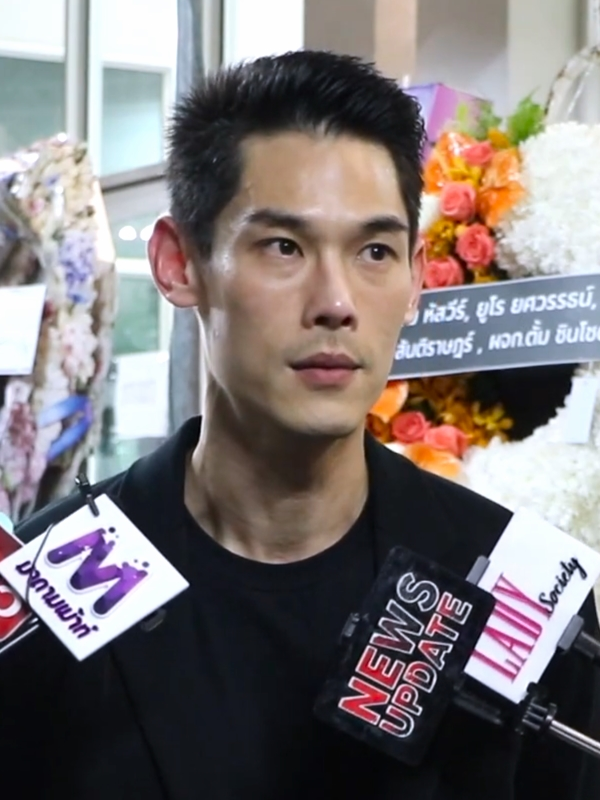
- Kantathavorn On 20 September 2024
- Born: 6 December 1985 (age 40); Bangkok, Thailand
- Occupations: Actor; television host
- Years active: 2008–present
- Agents: Polyplus (2008–2015); Workpoint (2015–2024)
- Spouse: Iyada Srimoontree (m. 2018)

Kan Kantathavorn (Thai: กันต์ กันตถาวร; RTGS: Kan Kantathawon; born 6 December 1985), nicknamed Fluke, is a Thai actor and host.

== Early life ==
Kan graduated from the Bodindecha (Sing Singhaseni) School 2 and Chulalongkorn University.

== Personal life ==
On December 8, 2018, he married Ploy Iyada Kantathavorn (maiden name Srimoontree). The couple had been dating for 8 years before getting married.

== Career ==
He debuted in a Thai television drama based on the life of Varayuth Milinthajinda, Dao Jarus Fa. He appeared in commercials and music videos. He is host of Workpoint Entertainment.

=== Lawsuit ===
Kan has held the position Chief Marketing Officer (CMO), sharing the role with Pechaya Wattanamontree and Yuranunt Pamornmontri at The iCon Group Co., Ltd. However, following The iCon Group case, Kan announced a temporary suspension of his hosting duties on all Workpoint Entertainment programs on October 10, 2024, before officially terminating his contract with The iCon Group on October 12, 2024, stating, "Everything must be within the standards of correctness"

Subsequently, on October 16, 2024, a warrant was issued for Kan's arrest. Workpoint then issued a statement terminating its contract with Kan as a host and artist before he was apprehended by the police on the same day.

== Filmography ==
=== Film ===
Year	Title	Role
2017	The Moment	Karn
2018	7 Days	Tan
2021	God Bless the Trainees Too!	Kan

=== Dramas ===
Year	Title	Role
2008	Dao Jarut Fah	Kaen
2009	Buang Rai Pye Ruk	Chart
2010	Tur Gub Kao Lae Ruk Kong Rao	Chanon
2011	Rak Mai Mi Wan Tai	Ram
2012	Zeal 5 Kon Gla Tah Atam	Seentham Thawonrat
2012	Pang Sanaeha	Petch Harnronnarong/Paul
2012	Ching Nang	Meka
2013	Buang Barp	Khun Wai
2013	Carabao the Series	Yod (Ep. 4)
2014	Kularb Rai Kong Naai Tawan	Tawan
2014	Sanaeha Sunya Kaen	Nahkarin
2015	Nang Chada	Techin Phongdilok
2015	Lueat Tat Lueat	Anawin
2015	Club Friday Season 6: Too Much in Love	Pat
2016	Lah Dup Tawan	Pupha
2016	Raeng Chang	Chongchang
2017	7 Wun Jorng Wen Season 2	Kong
2018	Sao Noy Roy Mor	Deputy Likit
2019	Answer for Heaven	Add
2020	Voice in the Rain	Pachara Kriengkaisakun (Porch)

=== As Host ===
Host of Workpoint TV

- Big Ben Show (2015)
- Bao Young Blood Season 2 (2016)
- I Can See Your Voice Thailand (2016–2022)
- Fan Pan Tae Super Fan (2016–2017)
- Fan Pan Tae (2018)
- Bao Young Blood Season 3 (2017)
- The Mask Singer (2016–2023)
- Diva Makeover (2017–2018)
- 10 Fight 10 (2019–2020, 2022)
- The Two (2022)
- Fandom (2023)
- Genwit (2024)
- The Wall Song (2020–2024)

== Awards ==
Awards
Year	Award	Category	Nominated work	Result
2009	Top Awards	Male Rising Star		Nominated
2012	Top Awards	Best Actor	Pang Sanaeha	Nominated
2012	Drama Awards	Best Leading Actor	Pang Sanaeha	Nominated
2012	Drama Awards	Best Actor	Ching Nang	Nominated
2012	27th TV Gold Awards	Outstanding Actor	Ching Nang	Nominated
2013	11th Komchatluek Awards	Best Actor	Buang Barp	Nominated
2016	21st Asian Television Awards	Best Entertainment Presenter/Host	I Can See Your Voice Thailand	Nominated
2017	8th Nataraj Awards	Best Host	I Can See Your Voice Thailand	Won
2017	Maya Awards	Best Host	The Mask Singer	Won
