= The Mask Project A =

- Also known as: The Mask Project A
- Genre: Reality television
- Presented by: Kan Kantathavorn
- Country of origin: Thailand
- Original language: Thai
- No. of episodes: 15

Production
- Camera setup: Multi-camera
- Running time: 105 minutes
- Production company: Workpoint Entertainment

Original release
- Network: Workpoint TV
- Release: 28 June – 4 October 2018

Related
- Season 4; Line Thai; King of Mask Singer

The Mask Project A (Thai: เดอะแมสก์ โปรเจกต์เอ) is the fifth season of The Mask Singer, a Thai singing competition program presented by Kan Kantathavorn. It aired on Workpoint TV on Thursday at 20:05 from 28 June 2018 to 4 October 2018.

== Panel of Judges ==
No.	Name	Profession
1	Maneenuch Smerasut	Singing Teacher
2	Kiattisak Udomnak	MC
3	Jakkawal Saothongyuttitum	Music Producer, Composer
4	Yuttana Boon-Orm	Music Company Executive
5	Siriporn Yooyord	Comedian, Singer
6	Thanawat Prasitsomporn	MC
7	Nalin Hohler	Singer, Actress
8	Apitsada Kruakongka	Actress, Model
9	Saksit Vechsupaporn	Singer, Musician, Music Producer
10	Saranyu Winaipanit	Singer
11	Thanakrit Panichwid	Singer
12	Sunaree Ratchasima	Singer
13	Napapa Tantrakul	Actress, MC
14	Nattawut Srimhok	Rapper
15	Pramote Pathan	Singer, Host
16	Pongkool Suebsung	Singer, Host
17	Apiwat Ueathavornsuk	Singer, Musician
18	Wichayanee Pearklin	Singer, Actress, Host
19	Thanida Thamwimon	Singer
20	Thanatat Chaiyaat	Singer, Actor, Songwriter
21	Bongkot Charoentham	Singer
22	Tachaya Pathumwan	Singer, Musician
23	Nattapat Wipatdetchtragoon	Singer, Actress
24	Tanont Chumroen	Singer

== First round ==
=== Group 1 Jungle War ===
Order	Episode	Stage Name	Song	Identity	Profession	Result
1	EP.1	Teapot Crow	คนสุดท้าย	Undisclosed		Advanced to Semi-Final
1	EP.1	Rainbow Crow	กดดัน	Zack Chumphae	Singer	Eliminated
1	EP.1	Hare	Mercy	Undisclosed		Advanced to Semi-Final
1	EP.1	Special Song: คิดถึงฉันไหมเวลาที่เธอ (Covered by Durian, Black Crow and Kangaroo)				
2	EP.2	Albino Buffalo	Where Is the Love?	Maria Poonlertlarp	Miss Universe Thailand, Model, Singer	Eliminated
2	EP.2	Iron Crow	นักโทษประหาร	Undisclosed		Advanced to Semi-Final
2	EP.2	Rottweiler	The Phantom of the Opera	Undisclosed		Advanced to Semi-Final
2	EP.2	Special Song: ไหวอะเปล่า เบเบ้ and The Rapper (Covered by Twopee (from Southside), Khan (Thaitanium), Teapot Crow and Rottweiler)				

=== Group 2 Sky War ===
Order	Episode	Stage Name	Song	Identity	Profession	Result
1	EP.3	Thunderbolt	คนที่ฆ่าฉัน	Undisclosed		Advanced to Semi-Final
1	EP.3	Stars	เธอมีฉัน ฉันมีใคร	Yang Soobin	YouTuber, Entertainer, Gastronome	Eliminated
1	EP.3	Cloud	Moves Like Jagger	Undisclosed		Advanced to Semi-Final
2	EP.4	UFO	Dark Horse	Kao Jirayu (Old Mask in Season 3 : Wolf Mask)	Actor, Singer	Eliminated
2	EP.4	The Sun	Fallin'	Undisclosed		Advanced to Semi-Final
2	EP.4	The Moon	ฉันจะฝันถึงเธอ + 04:00	Undisclosed		Advanced to Semi-Final
2	EP.4	Special Song: I Will Survive (Covered by Maneenuch Smerasut)				

=== Group 3 Marine War ===
Order	Episode	Stage Name	Song	Identity	Profession	Result
1	EP. 7	Carp	Never Enough	Undisclosed		Advanced to Semi-Final
1	EP. 7	Jellyfish	ฝุ่น	Undisclosed		Advanced to Semi-Final
1	EP. 7	Giantess of the Andaman Sea	คาใจ	Aum Lukkana	Actress, Model	Eliminated
2	EP. 8	Sea Horse	ผิดที่เธอ	Undisclosed		Advanced to Semi-Final
2	EP. 8	Great White Shark	Eyes, Nose, Lips	Undisclosed		Advanced to Semi-Final
2	EP. 8	Sea Urchin (Pink)	ปล่อยน้ำใส่นาน้อง	Ton-Hom Sakuntala (Old Mask in Season 2 : Mushroom Mask)	DJ, Actress, Host	Eliminated
2	EP. 8	Sea Urchin (Yellow)	ปล่อยน้ำใส่นาน้อง	Boy Pisanu	Actor, Host, Singer	Eliminated

== Semi-final ==
=== Group 1 Jungle War ===
Order	Episode	Stage Name	Song	Identity	Profession	Result
1	EP. 6	Teapot Crow	ซากคน	Toffy 3.50	Comedian, Actor, Singer	Eliminated
1	EP. 6	Rottweiler	O.K. นะคะ	Kang-Som	Singer, Actor, Songwriter	Eliminated
1	EP. 6	Hare	แสงสุดท้าย	Undisclosed		Advanced to Final
1	EP. 6	Iron Crow	Somebody That I Used to Know	Undisclosed		Advanced to Final

=== Group 2 Sky War ===
Order	Episode	Stage Name	Song	Identity	Profession	Result
1	EP. 5	Thunderbolt	พายุในใจ	Songkarn Rangsan (Old Mask in Season 1 : Pork Chili Dip Mask)	Singer, Actor	Eliminated
1	EP. 5	Cloud	When We Were Young	Pat Klear	Singer, Songwriter, Architect	Eliminated
1	EP. 5	The Moon	ผู้ชายในฝัน	Undisclosed		Advanced to Final
1	EP. 5	The Sun	คืนรัง	Undisclosed		Advanced to Final

=== Group 3 Marine War ===
Order	Episode	Stage Name	Song	Identity	Profession	Result
1	EP. 9	Jellyfish	จีนี่ จ๋า	Keng Tachaya	Singer, Musician	Eliminated
1	EP. 9	Carp	เพลงสุดท้าย	Undisclosed		Advanced to Final
1	EP. 9	Great White Shark	หมากัด	Chin Chiwanut (Old Mask in Season 3 : Candle Mask)	Singer, Actor, Dancer, Soldier	Eliminated
1	EP. 9	Seahorse	ไหง่ง่อง	Undisclosed		Advanced to Final
1	EP. 9	Special Song: Part of Your World (Covered by Diamond Crown : Wichayanee Pearklin)				

== Final ==
Group	Episode	Stage Name	Song	Identity	Profession	Result
Jungle War	EP.10	Hare	Impossible	Beau Sunita	Singer	Eliminated
Jungle War	EP.10	Iron Crow	เพียงรัก	Undisclosed		Advanced to Champ VS Champ
Jungle War	EP.10	Duet: ความคิด (Featuring Compass : Apiwat Ueathavornsuk)				
Sky War	EP.11	The Moon	เธอจะอยู่กับฉันตลอดไป	Film Bongkot	Singer	Eliminated
Sky War	EP.11	The Sun	If I Were A Boy	Undisclosed		Advanced to Champ VS Champ
Sky War	EP.11	Duet: มอเตอร์ไซค์นุ่งสั้น (Featuring Witch : Sunaree Ratchasima)				
Marine War	EP.12	Carp	ช้ำคือเรา	Undisclosed		Advanced to Champ VS Champ
Marine War	EP.12	Seahorse	All By Myself	Pui-Fai Nattapat (Old Mask in Season 2 : Flower Mask)	Singer, Actress	Eliminated
Marine War	EP.12	Duet: ภาพลวงตา (Featuring Thanida Thamwimon)				

== Champ VS Champ ==
Episode	Champ from group	Stage Name	Song	Identity	Profession	Result
EP.13	Jungle War	Iron Crow	ดาวประดับฟ้า	Ae Jirakorn (Old Mask in Season 1 : Black Crow Mask)	Singer	Eliminated
EP.13	Sky War	The Sun	ยาพิษ	Undisclosed		Advanced to Champ of the Champ
EP.13	Marine War	Carp	ขอแค่ได้รู้	Undisclosed		Advanced to Champ of the Champ
EP.13	Group song: หมากเกมนี้					

== Champ of the Champ ==
Episode	Champ from group	Stage Name	Song	Identity	Profession	Result
EP.14	Sky War	The Sun	And I'm Telling You I'm Not Going	Jew Piyanut	Singer	Champion
EP.14	Marine War	Carp	ไม่มีใคร	Aof Pongsak	Singer, Actor	Runner-up
EP.14	Duet: Roar					

== Celebration of The Mask Champion ==
Episode	Song	Stage Name
EP.15	ยิ่งไม่รู้ ยิ่งต้องทำ	The Sun, Green Tea Worm, Little Duck
EP.15	รักยังไม่ต้องการ	Carp, Seahorse
EP.15	ส่งข่าวสาวเลย	Little Duck, Carp, Seahorse, Rottweiler
EP.15	ภาพจำ	Little Duck, Carp
EP.15	ขอบฟ้า	Green Tea Worm, Iron Crow
EP.15	รอแล้วได้อะไร	The Sun, Bee

== Elimination table ==
Contestant	Identity	Ep.1	Ep.2	Ep.3	Ep.4	Ep.5	Ep.6	Ep.7	Ep.8	Ep.9	Ep.10	Ep.11	Ep.12	Ep.13	Ep.14
The Sun	Jew Piyanut	—N/a	—N/a	—N/a	SAFE	SAFE	—N/a	—N/a	—N/a	—N/a	—N/a	WIN	—N/a	SAFE	Winner
Carp	Aof Pongsak	—N/a	—N/a	—N/a	—N/a	—N/a	—N/a	SAFE	—N/a	SAFE	—N/a	—N/a	WIN	SAFE	Runner-up
Iron Crow	Ae Jirakorn	—N/a	SAFE	—N/a	—N/a	—N/a	SAFE	—N/a	—N/a	—N/a	WIN	—N/a	—N/a	OUT	
Seahorse	Pui-Fai Nattapat	—N/a	—N/a	—N/a	—N/a	—N/a	—N/a	—N/a	SAFE	SAFE	—N/a	—N/a	OUT		
The Moon	Film Bongkot	—N/a	—N/a	—N/a	SAFE	SAFE	—N/a	—N/a	—N/a	—N/a	—N/a	OUT			
Hare	Beau Sunita	SAFE	—N/a	—N/a	—N/a	—N/a	SAFE	—N/a	—N/a	—N/a	OUT				
Great White Shark	Chin Chinawut	—N/a	—N/a	—N/a	—N/a	—N/a	—N/a	—N/a	SAFE	OUT					
Jellyfish	Keng Tachaya	—N/a	—N/a	—N/a	—N/a	—N/a	—N/a	SAFE	—N/a	OUT					
Pink Sea Urchin & Yellow Sea Urchin	Ton-Hom Sakuntala & Boy Pisanu	—N/a	—N/a	—N/a	—N/a	—N/a	—N/a	—N/a	OUT						
Giantess of the Andaman Sea	Aum Lukkana	—N/a	—N/a	—N/a	—N/a	—N/a	—N/a	OUT							
Rottweiler	Kang-Som	—N/a	SAFE	—N/a	—N/a	—N/a	OUT								
Teapot Crow	Toffy 3.50	SAFE	—N/a	—N/a	—N/a	—N/a	OUT								
Cloud	Pat Klaer	—N/a	—N/a	SAFE	—N/a	OUT									
Thunderbolt	Songkarn Rangsan	—N/a	—N/a	SAFE	—N/a	OUT									
UFO	Kao Jirayu	—N/a	—N/a	—N/a	OUT										
Stars	Yang Soobin	—N/a	—N/a	OUT											
Albino Buffalo	Maria Poonlertlarp	—N/a	OUT												
Rainbow Crow	Zack Chumphae	OUT													

This contestant won the battle and moves on to the next round.
This contestant is safe from elimination.
This contestant is eliminated.

== The Mask Truce Day ==
The Mask Truce Day is a Thai special program about guess singers in masks after the finished Project A series that aired 15 episodes. the word Truce means temporarily stay competitive.

This special program broadcast only 2 episodes presented by Kan Kantathavorn. It airs on Workpoint TV on Thursday at 20:05, starting from 11–18 October 2018.

Episode	Order	Stage Name	Song	Identity	Profession
EP.16	1	Great Lion	ไม่ยอมตัดใจ	Manaswin Nuntasane	Singer, Songwriter
EP.16	1	Chinese Boy	ระยะทำใจ + รักกันมั้ย	Ekachai Euesungkomsate	Singer, Actor, MC
EP.16	1	Special Song: คู่กัด (Covered by Lion King, Chinese Boy, Hawk and Bear)			
EP.17	2	Hawk	ขอบใจจริงๆ	Pongsak Pongsuwan	Comedian, Singer
EP.17	2	Bear	ละครรักแท้	Pornphan Chunhachai	Singer
EP.17	2	Special Song: ต้องโทษดาว... (Covered by Tanont Chumroen and Nattapat Wipatdetchtragoon)			
