= The Mask Line Thai =

Thai singing competition program

- Also known as: The Mask Line Thai
- Genre: Reality television
- Presented by: Kan Kantathavorn
- Country of origin: Thailand
- Original language: Thai
- No. of episodes: 20

Production
- Camera setup: Multi-camera
- Running time: 105 minutes
- Production company: Workpoint Entertainment

Original release
- Network: Workpoint TV
- Release: 25 October 2018 – 7 March 2019

Related
- Project A; Thai Literature; King of Mask Singer

The Mask Line Thai (Thai: เดอะแมสก์ ลายไทย) is the sixth season of The Mask Singer, a Thai singing competition program presented by Kan Kantathavorn. The program aired on Workpoint TV on Thursday at 20:05 from 25 October 2018 to 7 March 2019.

The tournament format is similar to that of Project A, but the difference is this season was combined with the uniqueness of Thai culture (example: Mask costumes, Thai music etc.)

== Panel of Judges ==
No.	Name	Profession
1	Maneenuch Smerasut	Singing Teacher
2	Jakkawal Saothongyuttitum	Music Producer, Composer
3	Kiattisak Udomnark	MC
4	Thanawat Prasitsomporn	MC
5	Apitsada Kruakongka	Actress, Model
6	Siriporn Yooyord	Comedian, Singer
7	Nattawut Srimhok	Rapper
8	Pisanu Nimsakul	Singer, Actor, MC
9	Sudarat Phonamkham	Comedian, News Anchor
10	Yuttana Boon-Orm	Music Company Executive
11	Celine Horwang	Actress, Model
12	Nalin Hohler	Singer, Actress
13	Thanatat Chaiyaat	Singer, Actor
14	Sakuntala Teinpairoj	Actress, MC, DJ
15	Napatsorn Phutornjai	Singer
16	Phattarawadee Pinthong	Comedian
17	Rusameekae Fagerlund	Actor, MC
18	Nitidon Pomsuwan	Actor, Model
19	Sarunyu Winaipanit	Singer, Actor, Voice Actor
20	Sakolrat Woraurai	Singer, Actress
21	Ekachai Srivichai	Singer
22	Nichkhun Horvejkul	Singer, Actor
23	Seo Ji-yeon	Actress
24	Kapol Thongplub	DJ, MC

== First round ==
=== Group 1 Mai Ek ===
Order	Episode	Stage Name	Song	Identity	Profession	Result
1	EP.1	Thai Warrior	หัวใจทศกัณฐ์	Undisclosed		Advanced to Semi-Final
1	EP.1	Fighting Fish	ไว้ใจ๋ได้กา + สวัสดีเจ้า	Ploychompoo	Singer, Actress	Eliminated
1	EP.1	Konja Cat	แม้ว่า	Undisclosed		Advanced to Semi-Final
2	EP.2	Benjarong	หมดใจ	Undisclosed		Advanced to Semi-Final
2	EP.2	Threshing Basket	เก็บอยู่ในหัวใจ	Undisclosed		Advanced to Semi-Final
2	EP.2	Rice Sheaf	ห่อหมกฮวกไปฝากป้า	Poppy Prachyaluck (Old Mask in Season 4 : Grass Flower Mask)	Singer	Eliminated

=== Group 2 Mai Tho ===
Order	Episode	Stage Name	Song	Identity	Profession	Result
1	EP.3	Manora	โปรดเถิดรัก	Undisclosed		Advanced to Semi-Final
1	EP.3	Singha	ฉันรู้	Tai Tanawut	Singer	Eliminated
1	EP.3	Dara Thong	ดอกราตรี	Undisclosed		Advanced to Semi-Final
2	EP.4	Albino Elephant	เต่างอย	Pexky Sretunya	Actress, MC	Eliminated
2	EP.4	Foi Thong	อย่าใกล้กันเลย	Undisclosed		Advanced to Semi-Final
2	EP.4	Water Buffalo	ข้ามันลูกทุ่ง	Undisclosed		Advanced to Semi-Final

=== Group 3 Mai Tri ===
Order	Episode	Stage Name	Song	Identity	Profession	Result
1	EP.5	Kinnaree	หัวใจคนรอ	Waii	Singer	Eliminated
1	EP.5	Kratip	ก้อนหินกับนาฬิกา	Undisclosed		Advanced to Semi-Final
1	EP.5	Tuk-Tuk	โคตรเลวในดวงใจ	Undisclosed		Advanced to Semi-Final
2	EP.6	Thai Loincloth	กุมภาพันธ์	Undisclosed		Advanced to Semi-Final
2	EP.6	Horse-Faced Woman	สาวนาสั่งแฟน	Seo Ji-yeon	Actress	Eliminated
2	EP.6	Green Giant	อาจจะเป็นคนนี้	Undisclosed		Advanced to Semi-Final
2	EP.6	Red Giant	อาจจะเป็นคนนี้	Undisclosed		Advanced to Semi-Final
2	Special Song: บัลลังก์เมฆ (Covered by Maneenuch Smerasut)					

=== Group 4 Mai Chattawa ===
Order	Episode	Stage Name	Song	Identity	Profession	Result
1	EP.13	Coconut Shell	คำหวาน (ที่เธอไม่เอา)	Undisclosed		Advanced to Semi-Final
1	EP.13	Silk	อย่าไปคิด	Mum Jokmok	Comedian, MC, Film Director	Eliminated
1	EP.13	Banana Leaf	นกขมิ้น + เจ้าช่อมาลี	Undisclosed		Advanced to Semi-Final
2	EP.14	Bamboo	เหงา	Undisclosed		Advanced to Semi-Final
2	EP.14	Takraw	ใจกลางเมือง	Tik Playground	Singer	Eliminated
2	EP.14	Duckweed	คืนจันทร์	Undisclosed		Advanced to Semi-Final

== Semi-final ==
=== Group 1 Mai Ek ===
Order	Episode	Stage Name	Song	Identity	Profession	Result
1	EP.9	Benjarong	ไม่มีเธอ ไม่ตาย	Arm Kornkan (Old Mask in Season 1 : Bell Mask)	Actor, MC, News Anchor	Eliminated
1	EP.9	Threshing Basket	ลาก่อน	Por Unnop	Singer, Actor	Eliminated
1	EP.9	Thai Warrior	เสียใจได้ยินไหม	Undisclosed		Advanced to Final
1	EP.9	Konja Cat	ฝากใบลา	Undisclosed		Advanced to Final

=== Group 2 Mai Tho ===
Order	Episode	Stage Name	Song	Identity	Profession	Result
1	EP.7	Dara Thong	ซ่อนกลิ่น	Pui Duangpon	Singer	Eliminated
1	EP.7	Foi Thong	ไม่เดียงสา	Mint Mintita	Singer, Actress	Eliminated
1	EP.7	Water Buffalo	ในความคึดฮอดมีแต่เจ้าผู้เดียว	Undisclosed		Advanced to Final
1	EP.7	Manora	น้ำตาโนราห์	Undisclosed		Advanced to Final

=== Group 3 Mai Tri ===
Order	Episode	Stage Name	Song	Identity	Profession	Result
1	EP.11	Green Giant	ภาพจำ + ความเจ็บปวด	Undisclosed		Advanced to Final
1	EP.11	Red Giant	ภาพจำ + ความเจ็บปวด	Undisclosed		Advanced to Final
1	EP.11	Thai Loincloth	ชีวิตยังคงสวยงาม	Saranya Sonsermsawat	Singer	Eliminated
1	EP.11	Kratip	ทางของฝุ่น	Most Witsarut	Actor	Eliminated
1	EP.11	Tuk-Tuk	ปิดตาข้างนึง	Undisclosed		Advanced to Final

=== Group 4 Mai Chattawa ===
Order	Episode	Stage Name	Song	Identity	Profession	Result
1	EP.15	Bamboo	ทุกคนเคยร้องไห้	Undisclosed		Advanced to Final
1	EP.15	Coconut Shell	ฉันไม่ใช่	Mon Warisana	Singer	Eliminated
1	EP.15	Banana Leaf	ตั๊กแตนผูกโบว์	Mew Boom Boom Cash	Singer	Eliminated
1	EP.15	Duckweed	ไม่อยู่ในชีวิตแต่อยู่ในหัวใจ	Undisclosed		Advanced to Final
1	EP.15	Special Song: อย่าลืมโนราห์ (Covered by Ekachai Srivichai)				

== Final ==
Group	Episode	Stage Name	Song	Identity	Profession	Result
Mai Ek	EP.10	Konja Cat	คิดถึง	Undisclosed		Advanced to Champ VS Champ
Mai Ek	EP.10	Thai Warrior	แด่เธอที่รัก	Natthew	Singer, Actor	Eliminated
Mai Ek	EP.10	Duet: ดั่งฝันฉันใด				
Mai Tho	EP.8	Manora	คําตอบสุดท้าย	Undisclosed		Advanced to Champ VS Champ
Mai Tho	EP.8	Water Buffalo	ของหมั้นเป็นของขวัญ	Toom-Tam Yuttana	Singer, Actor	Eliminated
Mai Tho	EP.8	Duet: คนบ้านเดียวกัน				
Mai Tri	EP.12	Tuk-Tuk	นอกจากชื่อฉัน	Undisclosed		Advanced to Champ VS Champ
Mai Tri	EP.12	Green Giant	รักปาฏิหาริย์	Sirasak	Singer	Eliminated
Mai Tri	EP.12	Red Giant	รักปาฏิหาริย์	Chawin Chitsomboon	Singer	Eliminated
Mai Tri	EP.12	Trio: สามสิบยังแจ๋ว + 30 จีบได้				
Mai Chattawa	EP.16	Bamboo	อีกหน่อยเธอคงเข้าใจ	Chompoo Fruity	Singer, Actor	Eliminated
Mai Chattawa	EP.16	Duckweed	My Heart Will Go On + ให้ใจฉันไปกับเธอ	Undisclosed		
Mai Chattawa	EP.16	Duet: เพลงลูกกรุง				

== Champ VS Champ ==
=== First round ===
Episode	Champ from group	Stage Name	Song	Identity	Profession	Result
EP.17	Mai Ek	Konja Cat	หัวใจมักง่าย	Matang Radupdao	Singer	Eliminated
EP.17	Mai Tho	Manora	เคยรักฉันบ้างไหม	Undisclosed		Advanced to Second Round
EP.17	Mai Tri	Tuk-Tuk	นึกเสียว่าสงสาร	Undisclosed		Advanced to Second Round
EP.17	Mai Chattawa	Duckweed	พี่ชายที่แสนดี	Undisclosed		Advanced to Second Round

=== Second round ===
Episode	Champ from group	Stage Name	Song	Identity	Profession	Result
EP.18	Mai Tho	Manora	ไม่สมศักดิ์ศรี	Undisclosed		Advanced to Champ of the Champ
EP.18	Mai Tri	Tuk-Tuk	ความเชื่อ	Undisclosed		Advanced to Champ of the Champ
EP.18	Mai Chattawa	Duckweed	แสงจันทร์	Mariam B5	Singer	Eliminated
EP.18	Group song: โลกาโคม่า					

== Champ of the Champ ==
Episode	Champ from group	Stage Name	Song	Identity	Profession	Result
EP.19	Mai Tho	Manora	กัญชา	Pin Pornchanok	Singer	Runner-up
EP.19	Mai Tri	Tuk-Tuk	อกหัก + ชีวิตเป็นของเรา + แสงสุดท้าย	Prang Pranthip	Singer	Champion
EP.19	Duet: หนูไม่รู้					

== Celebration of The Mask Champion ==
Episode	Song	Stage Name
EP.20	สาวเชียงใหม่	The Sun and Bee
EP.20	ปักษ์ใต้บ้านเรา	Manora
EP.20	แม่เกี่ยว	Duckweed
EP.20	ไหง่ง่อง	Konja Cat
EP.20	ขอให้รวย	The Sun, Bee, Manora, Duckweed, Konja Cat and Tuk-Tuk
EP.20	เสือสิ้นลาย	Nattawut Srimhok, Banana Leaf, Fighting Fish, Tuk-Tuk and The Moon
EP.20	ลาวคำหอม	Dara Thong, The Moon and Konja Cat
EP.20	โอ้ละหนอ...My Love	Thai Warrior, Water Buffalo, Manora and Duckweed
EP.20	Music Lover	All the mask in season 4, Project A and Line Thai

== Elimination table ==
Contestant	Identity	Ep.1	Ep.2	Ep.3	Ep.4	Ep.5	Ep.6	Ep.7	Ep.8	Ep.9	Ep.10	Ep.11	Ep.12	Ep.13	Ep.14	Ep.15	Ep.16	Ep.17	Ep.18	Ep.19
Tuk-Tuk	Prang Pranthip	—N/a	—N/a	—N/a	—N/a	SAFE	—N/a	—N/a	—N/a	—N/a	—N/a	SAFE	WIN	—N/a	—N/a	—N/a	—N/a	SAFE	SAFE	Winner
Manora	Pin Pornchanok	—N/a	—N/a	SAFE	—N/a	—N/a	—N/a	SAFE	WIN	—N/a	—N/a	—N/a	—N/a	—N/a	—N/a	—N/a	—N/a	SAFE	SAFE	Runner-up
Duckweed	Mariam B5	—N/a	—N/a	—N/a	—N/a	—N/a	—N/a	—N/a	—N/a	—N/a	—N/a	—N/a	—N/a	—N/a	SAFE	SAFE	WIN	SAFE	OUT	
Konja Cat	Matang Radupdao	SAFE	—N/a	—N/a	—N/a	—N/a	—N/a	—N/a	—N/a	SAFE	WIN	—N/a	—N/a	—N/a	—N/a	—N/a	—N/a	OUT		
Bamboo	Chompoo Fruity	—N/a	—N/a	—N/a	—N/a	—N/a	—N/a	—N/a	—N/a	—N/a	—N/a	—N/a	—N/a	—N/a	SAFE	SAFE	OUT			
Banana Leaf	Mew Boom Boom Cash	—N/a	—N/a	—N/a	—N/a	—N/a	—N/a	—N/a	—N/a	—N/a	—N/a	—N/a	—N/a	SAFE	—N/a	OUT				
Coconut Shell	Mon Warisana	—N/a	—N/a	—N/a	—N/a	—N/a	—N/a	—N/a	—N/a	—N/a	—N/a	—N/a	—N/a	SAFE	—N/a	OUT				
Takraw	Tik Playground	—N/a	—N/a	—N/a	—N/a	—N/a	—N/a	—N/a	—N/a	—N/a	—N/a	—N/a	—N/a	—N/a	OUT					
Silk	Mum Jokmok	—N/a	—N/a	—N/a	—N/a	—N/a	—N/a	—N/a	—N/a	—N/a	—N/a	—N/a	—N/a	OUT						
Green Giant & Red Giant	Sirasak & Chawin	—N/a	—N/a	—N/a	—N/a	—N/a	SAFE	—N/a	—N/a	—N/a	—N/a	SAFE	OUT							
Kratip	Most Witsarut	—N/a	—N/a	—N/a	—N/a	SAFE	—N/a	—N/a	—N/a	—N/a	—N/a	OUT								
Thai Loincloth	Saranya Sonsersawat	—N/a	—N/a	—N/a	—N/a	—N/a	SAFE	—N/a	—N/a	—N/a	—N/a	OUT								
Thai Warrior	Natthew	SAFE	—N/a	—N/a	—N/a	—N/a	—N/a	—N/a	—N/a	SAFE	OUT									
Threshing Basket	Por Unnop	—N/a	SAFE	—N/a	—N/a	—N/a	—N/a	—N/a	—N/a	OUT										
Benjarong	Arm Kornkan	—N/a	SAFE	—N/a	—N/a	—N/a	—N/a	—N/a	—N/a	OUT										
Water Buffalo	Toom-Tam Yuthana	—N/a	—N/a	—N/a	SAFE	—N/a	—N/a	SAFE	OUT											
Foi Thong	Mint Mintita	—N/a	—N/a	—N/a	SAFE	—N/a	—N/a	OUT												
Dara Thong	Pui Duangpon	—N/a	—N/a	SAFE	—N/a	—N/a	—N/a	OUT												
Horse-Faced Woman	Seo Ji-yeon	—N/a	—N/a	—N/a	—N/a	—N/a	OUT													
Kinnaree	Waii	—N/a	—N/a	—N/a	—N/a	OUT														
Albino Elephant	Pexky Sretunya	—N/a	—N/a	—N/a	OUT															
Singha	Tai Tanawut	—N/a	—N/a	OUT																
Rice Sheaf	Poppy Prachyaluck	—N/a	OUT																	
Fighting Fish	Ploychompoo	OUT																		

This contestant won the battle and moves on to the next round.
This contestant is safe from elimination.
This contestant is eliminated.

== The Mask Line Prang ==
The Mask Line Prang (Thai: เดอะมาสก์ ลายพราง) is a Thai special program about guess singers in masks after the finished Line Thai series that aired 20 episodes. The word Prang (พราง) means camouflage. This special program broadcast only 2 episodes presented by Kan Kantathavorn. It airs on Workpoint TV on Thursday at 20:05, starting from 14–21 March 2019.

Episode	Order	Stage Name	Song	Identity	Profession
EP.1	1	Calculator	กรุณาฟังให้จบ	Pichet Iamchaona	Comedian
EP.1	1	Witch Queen	กลกามแห่งความรัก	Suwatchanee Phanitchiwa	Actress
EP.1	1	Special Song: ก็ใครมันจะไปรู้ล่ะ (Covered by Calculator, Witch Queen, Pit Bull and Cassette Tape)			
EP.2	2	Pit Bull	ล่า	Sudarat Phonamkham	Comedian, News Anchor
EP.2	2	Cassette Tape	สุดฤทธิ์สุดเดช	Samapol Piyapongsiri	MC, DJ, Actor
EP.2	2	Special Song: มาทำไม (Covered by the judges)			
