= Mask Singer 12 =

- Also known as: Mask Singer Twelve
- Genre: Reality television
- Presented by: Kan Kantathavorn
- Country of origin: Thailand
- Original language: Thai
- No. of episodes: 16

Production
- Camera setup: Multi-camera
- Running time: 105 minutes
- Production company: Workpoint Entertainment

Original release
- Network: Workpoint TV
- Release: 15 March – 28 June 2023

Related
- Thai Descendant; The Mask Soulmate; King of Mask Singer

Mask Singer 12 was the twelfth season of The Mask Singer, a Thai singing competition program presented by Kan Kantathavorn. The program aired on Workpoint TV on Wednesday at 20:05 from 15 March 2023.

== Panel of Judges ==
| No. | Name | Profession | Appeared in |
|---|---|---|---|
| 1 | Maneenuch Samatsut | Singing Teacher | Episode 1–8, 11—16 |
| 2 | Thanawat Prasittisomporn | Master of Ceremony | Episode 1—16 |
| 3 | Siriporn Yuyod | Comedienne, Singer | Episode 1–2, 4–6, 9—16 |
| 4 | Kiattisak Udomnak | Master of Ceremony | Episode 1–2, 4–5, 8—16 |
| 5 | Apissada Kueakhongkha | Actress, Model | Episode 1, 3, 7–8, 14, 16 |
| 6 | Myria Benedetti | Actress, Singer, Model | Episode 1 |
| 7 | Nipaporn Thititanakarn | Singer, MC, Actress | Episode 2 |
| 8 | Saowaluck Lelaputra | Singer, Artist, Writer | Episode 2 |
| 9 | Nalin Hohler | Actress, Dancer | Episode 3, 7, 9–10, 12, 15 |
| 10 | Yuttana Boon-Orm | Music Company Executive, MC | Episode 3, 7, 9, 13, 16 |
| 11 | Napatsorn Phutornjai | Singer | Episode 4 |
| 12 | Piyanut Sueachongpru | Singer | Episode 4 |
| 13 | Chawarin Perdpiriyawong | Actor, Singer | Episode 4 |
| 14 | Pruk Panich | Actor | Episode 4 |
| 15 | Christina Aguilar | Singer | Episode 5 |
| 16 | Burin Boonvisut | Singer | Episode 6 |
| 17 | Cris Horwang | Actress, Model, DJ, Ballet teacher | Episode 6, 11 |
| 18 | Sombat Thirasaroj | Organizer, Digital online | Episode 8 |
| 19 | Chittaphon Leechaiyapornkul | Singer, Dancer | Episode 8 |
| 20 | Billy Ogan | Actor, Singer, Host, Composer, Writer | Episode 9 |
| 21 | Tata Young | Singer, Actress, Model, Entrepreneur | Episode 10 |
| 22 | Thongchai Thongkanthom | Actor, Host | Episode 10 |
| 23 | Issara Kitnitchi | Singer | Episode 12 |
| 24 | Putthipong Assaratanakul | Actor, Singer | Episode 13 |
| 25 | Krissanapoom Pibulsonggram | Actor, Singer, Songwriter | Episode 14 |
| 26 | Wichayanee Pearklin | Singer, Actress | Episode 15 |

== First round ==
=== Group A ===
| Episode | Stage Name | Song | Identity | Profession | Result | Hidden Mask |
|---|---|---|---|---|---|---|
| EP.1 | Kirin | นะหน้าทอง | Chawarin Perdpiriyawong | Actor, Singer | Eliminated | —N/a |
| EP.1 | Surgical | เลือดกรุ๊ปบี (B Blood Type) | Undisclosed | | Advanced to Second round | Ballet |
| EP.1 | Special Show: รักไม่ช่วยอะไร (Performed by Myria Benedetti, Kirin and Surgical) | | | | | |
| EP.2 | Bull Terrier | นิทาน | Ketsepsawat Palakawong Na Ayudhya | MC, DJ | Eliminated | —N/a |
| EP.2 | King of Spades | คิดถึงเธอทุกที (ที่อยู่คนเดียว) | Undisclosed | | Advanced to Second round | Fire |
| EP.2 | Special Show: ครึ่งหนึ่งของชีวิต (Performed by Saowaluck Lelaputra, King of Spades and Bull Terrier) | | | | | |
| EP.3 | Ballet | จม | Sinjai Plengpanich | Actress, Singer | Eliminated | —N/a |
| EP.3 | Fire | เธอยัง | Undisclosed | | Advanced to Second round | —N/a |

=== Group B ===
| Episode | Stage Name | Song | Identity | Profession | Result | Hidden Mask |
|---|---|---|---|---|---|---|
| EP.5 | Horus | จันทร์เจ้า | Undisclosed | | Advanced to Second round | Yama |
| EP.5 | Worker Ant | I Have Nothing | Undisclosed | | Advanced to Second round | Clown |
| EP.5 | Special Show: พูดอีกที (Performed by Christina Aguilar, Horus and Worker Ant) | | | | | |
| EP.6 | Mushroom | Demons | Undisclosed | | Advanced to Second round | Mixed Veggies |
| EP.6 | Chocolate | วัดปะหล่ะ? (TEST ME) | Patcharasri Benjamas | MC, News Anchor | Eliminated | —N/a |
| EP.6 | Special Show: เกือบ (Performed by Burin Boonvisut, Chocolate and Mushroom) | | | | | |
| EP.7 | Mixed Veggies | ดวงเดือน | Undisclosed | | Advanced to Second round | —N/a |
| EP.7 | Clown | หยาดเหงื่อเพื่อแม่ | Mongkol Saadboonyapat | Comedian, Actor | Eliminated | —N/a |
| EP.7 | Yama | Creepin | Jirakorn Sompithak | Singer | Eliminated | —N/a |

=== Group C ===
| Episode | Stage Name | Song | Identity | Profession | Result | Hidden Mask |
|---|---|---|---|---|---|---|
| EP.9 | Baby | ความรัก, ตู้ปลา กับสุราหนึ่งป้าน | Undisclosed | | Advanced to Second round | Queen of Lions |
| EP.9 | Pearl | คอพับ | Pornchita Na songkhla | Actress, Singer, Model, Host | Eliminated | —N/a |
| EP.9 | Special Show: จนแต่เจ๋ง (Performed by Billy Ogan, Pearl and Baby) | | | | | |
| EP.10 | Siberian | คนไม่มีวาสนา + ใจกลางความเจ็บปวด | Undisclosed | | Advanced to Second round | Car |
| EP.10 | Tulip | The Moon Represents My Heart | Undisclosed | | Advanced to Second round | T-Rex |
| EP.10 | Special Show: โอ๊ะ...โอ๊ย (Performed by Tata Young, Siberian and Tulip) | | | | | |
| EP.11 | Queen of Lions | ยิ่งใกล้ยิ่งเจ็บ | Nualphan Lamsam | Chief Executive Officer | Eliminated | —N/a |
| EP.11 | T-Rex | เมื่อวาน | Undisclosed | | Advanced to Second round | —N/a |
| EP.11 | Car | งานเต้นรำในคืนพระจันทร์เต็มดวง | Pruk Panich | Actor | Eliminated | —N/a |

== Second round ==
=== Group A ===
| Episode | Stage Name | Song | Identity | Profession | Result |
|---|---|---|---|---|---|
| EP.4 | King of Spades | ขี้หึง | Pittawat Pruksakit | Rapper, Singer | Eliminated |
| EP.4 | Fire | หัวใจไม่อยู่กับตัว | Kornkan Sutthikoses | Actor, Singer | Eliminated |
| EP.4 | Surgical | แอบเหงา + Ditto | Anuroth Ketlekha | Singer | Eliminated |
| EP.4 | Special Show: Stand by หล่อ (Performed by Napatsorn Phutornjai, Piyanut Sueachongpru, Chawarin Perdpiriyawong and Pruk Panich) | | | | |

=== Group B ===
| Episode | Stage Name | Song | Identity | Profession | Result |
|---|---|---|---|---|---|
| EP.8 | Horus | ตะกายดาว | Undisclosed | | Advanced to Semi-Final |
| EP.8 | Worker Ant | Unstoppable | Undisclosed | | Advanced to Semi-Final |
| EP.8 | Mushroom | ทุกนาทีที่สวยงาม (Always With Me) | Paris Intarakomalyasut | Actor, Singer | Eliminated |
| EP.8 | Mixed Veggies | ถ้าเราเจอกันอีก (Until Then) + คำอธิษฐานด้วยน้ำตา | Undisclosed | | Advanced to Semi-Final |
| EP.8 | Special Show: Try My Luck (Performed by WayV) | | | | |

=== Group C ===
| Episode | Stage Name | Song | Identity | Profession | Result |
|---|---|---|---|---|---|
| EP.12 | Siberian | เพลงสุดท้าย + ไอ้สอง | Undisclosed | | Advanced to Semi-Final |
| EP.12 | T-Rex | ยาพิษ | Undisclosed | | Advanced to Semi-Final |
| EP.12 | Tulip | Just Give Me a Reason | Undisclosed | | Advanced to Semi-Final |
| EP.12 | Baby | กอด | Undisclosed | | Advanced to Semi-Final |
| EP.12 | Special Show: Leave the Door Open (Performed by Issara Kitnitchi) | | | | |

== Semi-Final ==
| Episode | Stage Name | Song | Identity | Profession | Result |
|---|---|---|---|---|---|
| EP.13 | Potato | When I Was Your Man | Putthipong Assaratanakul | Actor, Singer | Eliminated |
| EP.13 | Mixed Veggies | Good Day | Undisclosed | | Advanced to Final |
| EP.13 | Tulip | แทนใจ | Waruntorn Paonil | Singer | Eliminated |
| EP.13 | Special Show: Flowers (Performed by Mixed Veggies, Tulip and Potato) | | | | |
| EP.14 | T-Rex | พูดตรง ๆ | Undisclosed | | Advanced to Final |
| EP.14 | Worker Ant | เสแสร้ง (Pretend) + ดีแต่ปาก | Pimprapa Tangprabhaporn | Actress | Eliminated |
| EP.14 | Baby | หนอนผีเสื้อ | Krit Jeerapatananuwong | Singer | Eliminated |
| EP.14 | Special Show: Undo (Performed by Krissanapoom Pibulsonggram, T-Rex, Baby and Worker Ant) | | | | |
| EP.15 | Horus | หยดน้ำตา | Undisclosed | | Advanced to Final |
| EP.15 | Siberian | Idol | Jorin Khumpiraphan | Singer | Eliminated |
| EP.15 | Special Show: Golden Hour (Performed by Wichayanee Pearklin, Siberian and Horus) | | | | |

== Final ==
| Episode | Stage Name | Song | Identity | Profession | Result |
|---|---|---|---|---|---|
| EP.16 | Mixed Veggies | ถ้าเธอรักฉันจริง + Glimpse of Us | Achiraya Nitibhon | Singer | No Winner |
| EP.16 | T-Rex | Skyfall | Rial Gajbandit | Singer | No Winner |
| EP.16 | Horus | Dangerously + We Are The Champions | Karinyawat Durongjirakan | Singer | No Winner |
| EP.16 | Special Show: สลักจิต (Performed by Durian (SS1), Kangaroo (SS1), Green Tea Worm (SS3), Apple (SS3), Little Duck (SS4), Siberian, Worker Ant, Tulip, Mushroom, Baby, King of Spades, Fire, Surgical, Horus, Mixed Veggies and T-Rex) Money (Performed by Tulip, Worker Ant, Siberian and Mixed Veggies) รักแรก (FIRST LOVE) (Performed by Baby, Surgical, King of Spades, Mushroom, Fire, Horus and T-Rex) ไม่เป็นรอง (Performed by Apple, Green Tea Worm, Durian, Kangaroo and Little Duck) อย่าบอกให้ใครรู้ (Performed by Kangaroo, Mixed Veggies, Horus and T-Rex) | | | | |

== Elimination table ==
| Stage name | Identity | Episodes | | | | | | | | | | | | | | | |
| Stage name | Identity | 1 | 2 | 3 | 4 | 5 | 6 | 7 | 8 | 9 | 10 | 11 | 12 | 13 | 14 | 15 | 16 |
| Stage name | Identity | Group A | | | | Group B | | | | Group C | | | | Semi-Final | | | Final |
|---|---|---|---|---|---|---|---|---|---|---|---|---|---|---|---|---|---|
| Horus | First Slot Machine | | | | | SAFE | | | SAFE | | | | | | | SAFE | No Winner |
| T-Rex | Ryan Kajbandith | | | | | | | | | | ENT | SAFE | SAFE | | SAFE | | No Winner |
| Mixed Veggies | Ally Achiraya | | | | | | ENT | SAFE | SAFE | | | | | SAFE | | | No Winner |
| Siberian | Jorin 4EVE | | | | | | | | | | SAFE | | SAFE | | | OUT | |
| Baby | Kit Three Man Down | | | | | | | | | SAFE | | | SAFE | | OUT | | |
| Worker Ant | Pim Pimprapa | | | | | SAFE | | | SAFE | | | | | | OUT | | |
| Tulip | Ink Waruntorn | | | | | | | | | | SAFE | | SAFE | OUT | | | |
| Potato | Billkin Puttipong | | | | | | | | | | | | | OUT | | | |
| Queen of Lions | Madame Pang | | | | | | | | | ENT | | OUT | | | | | |
| Car | Zee Pruk | | | | | | | | | | ENT | OUT | | | | | |
| Pearl | Benz Pornchita | | | | | | | | | OUT | | | | | | | |
| Mushroom | Ice Pariss | | | | | | SAFE | | OUT | | | | | | | | |
| Clown | Nine Mongkol | | | | | ENT | | OUT | | | | | | | | | |
| Yama | Ae Jirakorn | | | | | ENT | | OUT | | | | | | | | | |
| Chocolate | Kalamare | | | | | | OUT | | | | | | | | | | |
| Surgical | Third Tilly Birds | SAFE | | | OUT | | | | | | | | | | | | |
| Fire | Arm Kornkan | | ENT | SAFE | OUT | | | | | | | | | | | | |
| King of Spades | Tong Twopee | | SAFE | | OUT | | | | | | | | | | | | |
| Ballet | Nak Sinjai | ENT | | OUT | | | | | | | | | | | | | |
| Bull Terrier | Na Nake | | OUT | | | | | | | | | | | | | | |
| Kirin | NuNew Chawarin | OUT | | | | | | | | | | | | | | | |

ENT The masked singer appeared as Hidden Mask in first round.
SAFE The masked singer was not unmasked and got through to the next round.
OUT The masked singer was unmasked and eliminated.
OUT The masked singer (Guest) was unmasked and eliminated.
The masked singer did not perform.
