= The Mask Soulmate =

2024 Thai TV singing competition

- Also known as: The Mask Soulmate หน้ากากคู่แท้
- Genre: Reality television
- Presented by: Siwat Chotchaicharin
- Country of origin: Thailand
- Original language: Thai
- No. of episodes: 11

Production
- Camera setup: Multi-camera
- Running time: 105 minutes
- Production company: Workpoint Entertainment

Original release
- Network: Workpoint TV
- Release: 4 December 2024 – 12 February 2025

Related
- Mask Singer 12; King of Mask Singer

The Mask Soulmate is the thirteenth season of The Mask Singer, a Thai singing competition program presented by Siwat Chotchaicharin. The program aired on Workpoint TV on 4 December 2024. It is the first season to be released internationally on Netflix.

This season features twelve pairs of competitors, with one pair being eliminated in each episode until one winner is left.

== Panel of Judges ==
No.	Name	Appeared in
1	Thanawat Prasitsomporn	Episode 1–2, 5–11
2	Yuttana Boon-Orm	Episode 1, 4
3	Krissanapoom Pibulsonggram	Episode 1
4	Pattarasaya Kreursuwansiri	Episode 1
5	Rusameekae Fagerlund	Episode 1
6	Siriporn Yuyod	Episode 2–4, 7–8, 10–11
7	Kiattisak Udomnak	Episode 2, 5–6, 8, 11
8	Nipaporn Thititanakarn	Episode 2
9	Pichaya Nitipaisalkul	Episode 2
10	Saranyu Winaipanit	Episode 3
11	Natthaphong Chatphong	Episode 3, 11
12	Thikamporn Ritta-apinan	Episode 3
13	Apissada Kueakhongkha	Episode 3–5, 7, 10–11
14	Piyanut Suajongpu	Episode 4
15	Paris Intarakomalyasut	Episode 4
16	Pisanu Chutanimsakul	Episode 5
17	Sujira Aroonpipat	Episode 5, 9
18	Napatsorn Suwannannon	Episode 6
19	Jackrin Kungwankiatichai	Episode 6
20	Warawut Poyim	Episode 6
21	Preechaya Pongthananikorn	Episode 7
22	Thongchai Thongkanthom	Episode 7, 9–10
23	Karinyawat Durongjirakan	Episode 8
24	Tanatat Chaiyaat	Episode 8
25	Thanakrit Panichwid	Episode 9
26	Premanat Suwannannon	Episode 9
27	Thanat Lowkhunsombat	Episode 10

== First round ==
Episode	Pairs	Stage Name	Song together	Song	Identity	Profession	Result
EP.1	1	Mat	วันนี้ปีที่แล้ว	รักจริง (แค่เมื่อวาน)	Niti Chaichitathorn	TV host, actor	Eliminated
EP.1	1	Pillow	วันนี้ปีที่แล้ว	รักจริง (แค่เมื่อวาน)	Thongchai Thongkanthom	Actor, host	Eliminated
EP.1	2	Butterfly	วันนี้ปีที่แล้ว	ไม่เจ็บอย่างฉันใครจะเข้าใจ	Undisclosed		Advanced to Second round
EP.1	2	Flower	วันนี้ปีที่แล้ว	ไม่เจ็บอย่างฉันใครจะเข้าใจ	Undisclosed		Advanced to Second round
EP.2	3	Bua Loi	ไม่ต้องรู้ว่าเราคบกันแบบไหน	แสนล้านนาที	Undisclosed		Advanced to Second round
EP.2	3	Sweet Poached Egg	ไม่ต้องรู้ว่าเราคบกันแบบไหน	แสนล้านนาที	Undisclosed		Advanced to Second round
EP.2	4	Groom	ไม่ต้องรู้ว่าเราคบกันแบบไหน	ลั่นทม	Pichukkana Wongsarattanasin	Actress, model	Eliminated
EP.2	4	Bride	ไม่ต้องรู้ว่าเราคบกันแบบไหน	ลั่นทม	Jacqueline Muench	Actress, model, YouTuber	Eliminated
EP.3	5	Panther	เลือกได้ไหม	นางฟ้ากับควาย	Undisclosed		Advanced to Second round
EP.3	5	Leopard	เลือกได้ไหม	นางฟ้ากับควาย	Undisclosed		Advanced to Second round
EP.3	6	Sky	เลือกได้ไหม	ทะเลสีดำ	Sarocha Chankimha	Actress, model, singer	Eliminated
EP.3	6	Sea	เลือกได้ไหม	ทะเลสีดำ	Rebecca Patricia Armstrong	Actress, singer, model	Eliminated
EP.4	7	Sun	วัดปะหล่ะ?	คืนจันทร์	Sarah Salola	Singer	Eliminated
EP.4	7	Moon	วัดปะหล่ะ?	คืนจันทร์	Jarinporn Joonkiat	Actress, model, host	Eliminated
EP.4	8	Lone Wolf	วัดปะหล่ะ?	เคยรักฉันบ้างไหม	Undisclosed		Advanced to Second round
EP.4	8	Cub	วัดปะหล่ะ?	เคยรักฉันบ้างไหม	Undisclosed		Advanced to Second round
EP.5	9	Toilet	หัวใจสะออน	ว่าว	Numchok Thanatram	Singer, actor, host	Eliminated
EP.5	9	Bidet	หัวใจสะออน	ว่าว	Gornpop Janjaroen	Singer, actor, host	Eliminated
EP.5	10	Yin	หัวใจสะออน	งานเต้นรำในคืนพระจันทร์เต็มดวง + เธอ	Undisclosed		Advanced to Second round
EP.5	10	Yang	หัวใจสะออน	งานเต้นรำในคืนพระจันทร์เต็มดวง + เธอ	Undisclosed		Advanced to Second round
EP.6	11	Hatred	ความรักทําให้คนตาบอด	คิดถึง	Undisclosed		Advanced to Second round
EP.6	11	Delusion	ความรักทําให้คนตาบอด	คิดถึง	Undisclosed		Advanced to Second round
EP.6	12	Deva	ความรักทําให้คนตาบอด	ไม่รัก…ไม่ต้อง	Anna Sueangam-iam	Actress	Eliminated
EP.6	12	Devil	ความรักทําให้คนตาบอด	ไม่รัก…ไม่ต้อง	Anntonia Porsild	Model	Eliminated

== Second round ==
Episode	From Pairs	Stage Name	Song together	Song	Identity	Profession	Result
EP.7	2	Butterfly	ถ้าเธอรักใครคนหนึ่ง	ทำไมต้องเธอ + นะหน้าทอง	Undisclosed		Advanced to Semi Final
EP.7	2	Flower	ถ้าเธอรักใครคนหนึ่ง	ทำไมต้องเธอ + นะหน้าทอง	Undisclosed		Advanced to Semi Final
EP.7	3	Bua Loi	ถ้าเธอรักใครคนหนึ่ง	ไฟรัก	Oab Oabnithi	Actor, model	Eliminated
EP.7	3	Sweet Poached Egg	ถ้าเธอรักใครคนหนึ่ง	ไฟรัก	Prang Kannarun	Actress, model, YouTuber	Eliminated
EP.8	8	Lone Wolf	คนมันรัก + คนใจง่าย	เลี้ยงส่ง	Undisclosed		Advanced to Semi Final
EP.8	8	Cub	คนมันรัก + คนใจง่าย	เลี้ยงส่ง	Undisclosed		Advanced to Semi Final
EP.8	5	Panther	คนมันรัก + คนใจง่าย	เหนื่อยจังอยากฟังเสียง	Mintra Indira	Singer, actress	Eliminated
EP.8	5	Leopard	คนมันรัก + คนใจง่าย	เหนื่อยจังอยากฟังเสียง	Joey Phuwasit	Singer, musician, composer	Eliminated
EP.9	10	Yin	เล่นของสูง	ที่ปรึกษา + เพื่อนสนิท	Norawit Titicharoenrak	Actor, model, singer	Eliminated
EP.9	10	Yang	เล่นของสูง	ที่ปรึกษา + เพื่อนสนิท	Nattawat Jirochtikul	Actor, singer	Eliminated
EP.9	11	Hatred	เล่นของสูง	สภาวะหัวใจล้มเหลวเฉียบพลัน	Undisclosed		Advanced to Semi Final
EP.9	11	Delusion	เล่นของสูง	สภาวะหัวใจล้มเหลวเฉียบพลัน	Undisclosed		Advanced to Semi Final

== Semi Final ==
Episode	From Pairs	Stage Name	Song together	Song	Identity	Profession	Result
EP.10	8	Lone Wolf	ยิ่งรู้จัก ยิ่งรักเธอ	รุนแรงเหลือเกิน	Undisclosed		Advanced to Final
EP.10	8	Cub	ยิ่งรู้จัก ยิ่งรักเธอ	รุนแรงเหลือเกิน	Undisclosed		Advanced to Final
EP.10	2	Butterfly	ยิ่งรู้จัก ยิ่งรักเธอ	ซ่อน(ไม่)หา	Korranid Laosubinprasoet	Singer, actress	Eliminated
EP.10	2	Flower	ยิ่งรู้จัก ยิ่งรักเธอ	ซ่อน(ไม่)หา	Hannah Rosenbloom	Singer, dancer, actress	Eliminated
EP.10	11	Hatred	ยิ่งรู้จัก ยิ่งรักเธอ	รักแท้หรือแค่เหงา	Undisclosed		Advanced to Final
EP.10	11	Delusion	ยิ่งรู้จัก ยิ่งรักเธอ	รักแท้หรือแค่เหงา	Undisclosed		Advanced to Final

== Final ==
Episode	From Pairs	Stage Name	Song	Identity	Profession	Result
EP.11	8	Lone Wolf	Stay + ความเจ็บปวด	Popethorn Soonthornyanakij	Singer, songwriter, actor	Runners-up
EP.11	8	Cub	Stay + ความเจ็บปวด	Isara Kitnitchi	Singer, actor	Runners-up
EP.11	11	Hatred	เหนื่อย	Jeff Satur	Singer-songwriter, record producer, actor	Champions
EP.11	11	Delusion	เหนื่อย	Nitchapha Veersutthimas	Singer-songwriter, record producer	Champions
