= The Mask Singer (Thai TV series) =

- Also known as: The Mask Singer หน้ากากนักร้อง
- Genre: Reality television
- Presented by: Kan Kantathavorn (Season 1−12); Siwat Chotchaicharin (Season 13)
- Country of origin: Thailand
- Original language: Thai
- No. of seasons: 13
- No. of episodes: 209 (with 8 specials)

Production
- Camera setup: Multi-camera
- Running time: 105 minutes
- Production company: Workpoint Entertainment

Original release
- Network: Workpoint TV
- Release: 5 October 2016 – present

Related
- King of Mask Singer

The Mask Singer (Thai: The Mask Singer หน้ากากนักร้อง, romanized: Doemaetsingngoe Nakaknakrong) is a Thai singing competition television series presented by Siwat Chotchaicharin. It aired every Thursday from 6 October 2016 to 3 September 2020 on Workpoint TV. In its entire original broadcast, The Mask Singer generated the highest ratings for a Thai variety game show in the digital TV era.

== Creation ==
Workpoint TV was offered the airing rights for South Korea's reality show King of Mask Singer, but they decided to purchase rights for the Shows Let Me In and I Can See Your Voice instead. When a Chinese company decided to produce their own version of King of Mask Singer, Workpoint TV then decided to purchase rights to King of Mask Singer.

The show maintains strict confidentiality for its contestants. Beginning with parking, contestants are required to switch vehicles to avoid being recognized. A crew will then pick them up and escort them to the studio, covering them with a cloth. If a contestant has a companion, the companion must wear a mask. During rehearsals, voice-altering devices are used. Individuals with knowledge of the contestants' identities, such as makeup artists and studio judges, must sign confidentiality agreements. In total, over 500 people are bound by these agreements. The secrecy extends to the editing room, mixing room, and all relevant areas.

The show's host was Kantapong Bumrungrak (also known as Gun Kantathavorn), who was selected due to his experience and television appeal. The production team applied methods from television drama production—such as taping episodes and reviewing footage for approval.

The judging panel consisted of a mix of entertainment industry professionals and experienced performers. The show maintained strict secrecy around contestant identities, beginning from arrival at the studio—contestants would switch vehicles to prevent recognition, be covered with cloaks, and even use voice modulators during rehearsals. Assistants and stylists were also required to wear masks. All involved staff, including makeup artists, costume designers, and production crew, signed confidentiality agreements, amounting to over 500 people. Editing and audio mixing rooms were locked and secured throughout post-production.

After season 4, the show introduced a new stage design and launched a series of special seasons, each with its own unique format and concept. Examples include masked duos competing together, contestants returning with new identities, and format changes such as themed groups. Notable themed seasons include The Mask Line Thai and The Mask Literature, which incorporated elements of Thai identity and literature into the show.

There were also special non-competitive episodes such as The Mask Truce Day and The Mask Line Prang.

In 2024, Gun Kantathavorn announced his departure from all Workpoint programs due to legal issues related to The iCON Group. His contract was subsequently terminated, making The Mask Soulmate the first season to be hosted by Si Siwat Chotchaicharin and the first season available on Netflix for on-demand viewing.

== Format ==
The contestants are broken up into four groups, each group containing eight masked celebrities. Each episode consists of two pairs of battling contestants, up until the final for each group, where the contestants perform a duet before battling it out.

The winner reveals their identity in the last episode of each season, unlike the Korean and Chinese versions, where the winner continues into the next season, only revealing their identity after a defeat.

The contestants are prompted to sing a song of their choice and design a unique costume with a team of designers. Each costume covers the entirety of the contestant's body, unlike in the Korean and Chinese versions, which only require face covering.

The identity of each contestant is kept confidential. When they arrive at the studio, staff members bring them cloaks to conceal their identity. Before filming the show, each contestant has to sign a contract ensuring they keep their identity a secret. During rehearsals, their voices are modified. The staff members who are authorized to know contestants' identity such as makeup artists, costume designers, the director, and studio staff, have signed contracts to keep it confidential. When editing the footage and audio, they lock the doors to stop anyone from looking through.

== Series overview ==
Series overview
Series	Contestants	Episodes	Originally released		Winner(s)	Runner(s)-up	Ref.
Series	Contestants	Episodes	First released	Last released	Winner(s)	Runner(s)-up	Ref.
1	32	20	5 October 2016	30 March 2017	Issara Kitnitchi as "Durian"	Jirakorn Sompithak as "Black Crow"	
2	32	20	6 April 2017	17 August 2017	Sarunrat Visutthithada as "Sumo"	Peerapat Thanewong as "Jaguar"	
3	32	20	7 September 2017	1 February 2018	Anuwat Sanguansakpakdee as "Green Tea Worm"	Chanakan Rattana-udom as "Slow Loris"	
4	32	20	8 February 2018	21 June 2018	Tanont Chumroen as "Little Duck"	Napatsorn Phutornjai as "Bee"	
5	18	17 (Note: With two special episodes after Episode 15, known as The Mask Truce Day. Aired on 11 and 18 October 2018)	28 June 2018	4 October 2018	Piyanut Sueachongpru as "The Sun"	Pongsak Rattanapong as "Carp"	
6	24	20 (Note: With two special episodes after Episode 20, known as The Mask Line Prang. Aired on 14 and 21 March 2019)	25 October 2018	7 March 2019	Prangthip Thalaeng as "Tuk-Tuk"	Pornchanok Liankattawa as "Manora"	
7	24	20 (Note: With two special episodes after Episode 20, known as The Mask Mirror. Aired on 15 and 22 August 2019)	28 March 2019	8 August 2019	Sivakorn Adulsuttikul as "Holvichai"; Jackrin Kungwankiatichai as "Kavee"	Suratikan Pakcharoen as "Mekkhala"	
8	12	11	29 August 2019	7 November 2019	Muanpair Panaboot as "Sagittarius"	Sudket Chuengcharoen as "Pisces"	
9	2 (After Thai Literature); 13 (After Zodiac)	13	14 November 2019	6 February 2020	—N/a	—N/a	
10	18	15	13 February 2020	21 May 2020	Jaruwat Cheawaram as "Snake Wife"	Arunpong Chaiwinit as "Balloon Darts"	
11	18	14	28 May 2020	3 September 2020	Ble Patumrach as "Bamboo Sticky Rice"	Earnkwan Waranya as "Baci"	
12	20	16	15 March 2023	28 June 2023	—N/a	—N/a	
13	24 (Divided 12 pairs)	11	4 December 2024	12 February 2025	Jeff Satur as "Hatred"; Nitchapha Veersutthimas as "Delusion"	Popethorn Soonthornyanakij as "Lone Wolf"; Isara Kitnitchi as "Cub"	

=== Special Episode ===
Special Episode	Air Date	Number of Episodes	Host	Notes
1+2 Fan Request	24, 31 August 2017	2 Episodes	Kan Kantathavorn	Due to the overwhelming popularity of the first two seasons, special episodes were produced featuring masks from both seasons performing together.
Truce Day	11, 18 October 2018	2 Episodes	Kan Kantathavorn	A non-competitive "truce" episode between the masks, focused on light-hearted entertainment. Aired after The Mask Project A.
Line Parang	14, 21 March 2019	2 Episodes	Kan Kantathavorn	A non-competitive "truce" episode between the masks, focused on light-hearted entertainment. Aired after The Mask Line Thai.
Mirror	15, 22 August 2019	2 Episodes	Kan Kantathavorn	A special episode aired after The Mask Thai Literature, in which former masks and singers with similar voices—or connections to the original performers—wore the same mask. The panelists had to guess who was the original and who was the impostor. This concept was later developed into the main season following The Mask Zodiac.
12 (Twelve)	8 March 2023	1 Episodes	None	A compilation of memorable and entertaining moments from all past seasons, aired ahead of the show's return after a three-year hiatus before Mask Singer 12 coming next week.
Soulmate	19 February 2025	1 Episodes	None	A compilation of memorable and emotional highlights from throughout the season of The Mask Soulmate.

== Format ==
In each season, a total of 32 contestants compete by singing while concealing their identities with elaborate costumes and masks. The panelists attempt to guess who is behind each mask. The contestant who receives the highest combined score from the judges and the live studio audience proceeds to the next round. The losing contestant is required to remove their mask and reveal their identity. The winner of each season unveils their identity in the final episode.

=== Competition Structure ===
Regular Seasons

In a typical season, the 32 contestants are divided into four groups: Group A, Group B, Group C, and Group D. In the first season, only 24 contestants were featured and divided into three groups (A, B, and C). Due to the show's popularity, a fourth group (D) was later added. Each group consists of 8 contestants, paired into 4 face-offs. Winners advance to the next round, where they are again paired into 2 face-offs. The winners of those matches then compete to determine the group champion. Each group champion proceeds to the final round, where the overall season winner, known as "The Mask Singer", is selected.

==== Special Seasons (Competitive) ====
There are six competitive special seasons:

- ''The Mask Project A''
- ''The Mask Line Thai''
- ''The Mask Literature'' (Thai: วรรณคดีไทย)
- ''The Mask Zodiac'' (Thai: จักรราศี)
- ''The Mask Carnival'' (Thai: งานวัด)
- ''The Mask Luk Thai'' (Thai: ลูกไทย)

In ''Project A'' and ''Line Thai'', previous contestants were allowed to return. Additionally, these seasons introduced pair performances. The group names were based on the season themes:

- Project A featured 19 contestants (18 masks), split into three groups: Jungle War, Sky War, and Marine War. Each group was further divided into two subgroups of 3 masks each. Four masks advanced to the next round, followed by a 4-contestant round to select 2 semifinalists. These finalists competed to determine the group champion, who then proceeded to the grand finale.
- Line Thai and Literature had 25 contestants (24 masks), divided into four groups named after Thai tonal marks: Mai Ek, Mai Tho, Mai Tri, and Mai Chattawa. ''Line Thai'' initially had three groups, with the fourth added later. The competition structure followed the same format as ''Project A''.
- Zodiac featured 13 contestants (12 masks), each representing a zodiac sign. The format included five rounds without group divisions.
- Carnival had 18 contestants (18 masks), divided into three groups and used the same format as ''Project A'' and ''Line Thai''.
- Luk Thai included 19 contestants (18 masks), split into groups Mai Ek, Mai Tho, and Mai Tri, following the same format as previous seasons.

==== Special Seasons (Non-Competitive) ====
Two non-competitive seasons were produced:

- ''The Mask Mirror'' – aired after ''Literature'' and ''Zodiac''
- ''Mask Singer 12'' – aired in 2023 (B.E. 2566)

=== Match Format ===
Before each match, the host announces the song title and original artist that each contestant will perform. Both contestants then sing their respective songs in full. After the performances, the seven-member judging panel discusses, analyzes, and attempts to guess the identities of the performers.

Voting is conducted by both the panel and a live studio audience of 169 members. Each of the seven judges can award up to 10 points, totaling a maximum of 70 points, while each audience member contributes 1 point, totaling 169 points. The combined maximum score is 239 points. The contestant with the higher score advances to the next round.

Group	Number of People	Score/People	Total	Total Score
Judges	7	10	70	240
Studio Audience	170	1	170	240

Each judge is given two minutes to interview the contestant individually. During the interview, contestants use voice modulators to disguise their voices. In special seasons, the interview duration is determined by the production team rather than being time-limited per judge.

== Judges ==
The panel of judges on The Mask Singer Thailand is responsible for analyzing the vocal techniques of the masked contestants and guessing their true identities, which remain concealed until the official reveal. Typically, there are six to seven judges per episode, with the panel rotating weekly. In some episodes, guest judges are also invited. Since the season The Mask Soulmate, the number of judges per episode was reduced to five.

Notable judges from both the regular and special seasons include:

Yutthana Boonorm (Pa Ted)

Siriporn Yooyod (Tuk)

Thanawat Prasit Somporn (Nui)

Maneenuch Smerasut (Kru Auan)

Nalin Hohler (Sara)

Kiattisak Udomnak (Senahoy)

Jakrawan Saothongyuthatham (Nueng)

Apisada Kreurkongka (Ice)

== Special episodes and concerts ==
=== Mini Concert The Mask Singer (2 April 2017) ===
A special mini-concert was held at the KBank Siam Pic-Ganesha Theatre on the 7th floor of Siam Square One, with three shows at 12:00, 16:00, and 20:00. The event was hosted by Kan Kantathavorn and featured nine masked performers: Durian Mask, Black Crow Mask, Dragon Mask, Kangaroo Mask, Pony Mask, Nam Prik Moo Mask, Bell Mask, Boar Mask, and Geisha Mask. Judges included Senahoy, Sara, and Nueng, who also performed live music. The concert was aired on Workpoint TV on 13 April 2017 from 09:00 to 11:30.

=== OPPO Presents Concert The Mask Singer 2 (2–3 September 2017) ===
Held at Hall 98, BITEC Bangna, this concert featured special child participants: Little Black Crow (Nong Tonkla) and Little Albino Crow (Nong Krista) from the program We Kid Thailand.

=== OPPO Presents The Mask Concert 3 (17–18 February 2018) ===
Organized at Royal Paragon Hall on the 5th floor of Siam Paragon, this concert included special guest appearances by BNK48.

=== Mask Party (2017) ===
A special holiday program broadcast during public holidays. Episodes 1–3 aired from 16:30 to 18:00, while episodes 4–5 aired from 09:30 to 11:00. The show was hosted by Kiattisak Udomnak (Senahoy), except for episode 4, which was hosted by Phitsanu Nimsakul (Boy AF). The episodes featured a variety of guest masked singers.

Date	Important Day	Mask	Person Under Mask	Mask Guest Singer	Reference
July 10, 2017	Asalha Bucha Day Compensation Day	Black Crow Mask	Jirakorn Sompitak (Eh)	Jirasak Panphum (White Monkey Mask); Pathompong Sombatpibul (Pong Hin Lek Fai)	
July 28, 2017	The Birthday Anniversary of His Majesty King Vajiralongkorn	Pheasant Mask	Saksit Vejsupaporn (To)	Apaporn Nakhon Sawan (Beauty Queen Mask)	
August 14, 2017	National Mother's Day	Compass Mask	Apiwat Eua-thawornsuk (Stamp)	Panyarisa Thianprasit (Wai Kamikaze); Natthawut Srimok (Golf Fukkying Hero)	
December 5, 2017	The Birthday Anniversary of His Majesty King Bhumibol Adulyadej the Great, National Day, and Father's Day	Durian Mask	Isara Kitnitchee (Tom)	Thanasit Chaturaphu (Mask of the Wizard); Members of Room 39; Chutimon Wichitrasri (Mon); Olar Chuchai (Wan Yai)	
December 11, 2017	Substitute Holiday for Constitution Day	Kangaroo mask	Palitchoke Ayanaputra (Peck)	Karakan Sutthikoses (Bell mask); Panadda Ruangwut (Turtle mask); Sirintip Hanpradit (Rose)	

== Awards ==
HOWE Hottest TV Program Award – Awarded for being the most popular program of the year at the HOWE Awards 2016, held on 1 March 2017.

MThai Top Talk-About TV Show – Recognized as the most talked-about TV program on social media at the MThai Top Talk-About 2017 awards, held on 10 March 2017.

The Best Variety Show – Awarded at the Kazz Awards 2017 ceremony, held on 22 May 2017.

Best Variety Program – Received the award at the 8th Nataraja Awards, held on 20 July 2017.

Gold Medal, International Emmy Awards (2018) – Honored in the Unscripted Entertainment category as a nominated show in 2018.
