= The Mask Singer (Thai TV series) season 4 =

The Mask Singer
- Season 4
- Presented by: Kan Kantathavorn
- No. of episodes: 20

Release
- Original network: Workpoint TV
- Original release: 8 February – 21 June 2018

Season chronology
- ← Previous; Season 3 Next → The Mask Project A

The Mask Singer Season 4 (Thai: The Mask Singer หน้ากากนักร้อง ซีซันที่ 4) is a Thai singing competition program presented by Kan Kantathavorn. It aired on Workpoint TV on Thursday at 20:15 from 8 February 2018 to 21 June 2018.

== Panel of Judges ==
No.	Name	Profession
1	Maneenuch Smerasut	Singing Teacher
2	Kiattisak Udomnak	Actor, comedian, singer
3	Jakkawal Saothongyuttitum	Music Producer, Composer
4	Yuttana Boon-Orm	Music Company Executive
5	Siriporn Yooyord	Singer, Comedian
6	Thanawat Prasitsomporn	DJ
7	Nalin Hohler	Singer, Actress
8	Apissada Kreurkongka	Actress, Model
9	Seo Ji-yeon	Singer, Actress
10	Pongsak Rattanaphong	Singer, Actor
11	Saksit Vechsupaporn	Singer, Musician, Music Producer
12	Pete Phol Nopwichai	Singer, Actor
13	Puttachard Pongsuchat	DJ, Actress
14	Kunpimook Bhuwakul	Singer, Rapper
15	Saranyu Winaipanit	Singer
16	Pongkool Suebsung	Singer, Actor, Presenter, Song Writer
17	Napapa Tantrakul	Actress, Presenter
18	Pidsanu Nimsakul	Singer, Actor
19	Sakuntala Thianphairot	DJ

== First round ==
=== Group A ===
Order	Episode	Stage Name	Song	Identity	Profession	Result
1	EP.1	Goldfish	Wrecking Ball	Undisclosed		Advanced to Semi-Final
1	EP.1	Jackfruit	คำถามโง่ ๆ	Lift Supoj	Actor, Singer	Eliminated
2	EP.1	Pirate	คืนจันทร์	Undisclosed		Advanced to Semi-Final
2	EP.1	Puppet	ต้องมีสักวัน	Ping Lumprapleng	Film Director, Screenwriter, Actor	Eliminated
3	EP.2	Little Duck	Stand Up for Love	Undisclosed		Advanced to Semi-Final
3	EP.2	Pigeon	เวลาเท่านั้น	Yam Thapanee	Announcer, Reporter	Eliminated
4	EP.2	Angel	Bleeding Love	Natacha Satjakul	Actress, Model	Eliminated
4	EP.2	Cauliflower	(I Love You) For Sentimental Reasons	Undisclosed		Advanced to Semi-Final

=== Group B ===
Order	Episode	Stage Name	Song	Identity	Profession	Result
1	EP.4	Panda	무제(無題) (Untitled, 2014)	Undisclosed		Advanced to Semi-Final
1	EP.4	Robot	Theoretical Love	Noom Attaporn	Film Director, Actor, Singer, Presenter	Eliminated
2	EP.4	Cactus	Speechless	Undisclosed		Advanced to Semi-Final
2	EP.4	Tiger	แก้วตาขาร็อค	Somjit Jongjohor	Thai Boxer, Actor	Eliminated
3	EP.5	Gunman	น้ำเต็มแก้ว	Padthai Deejai	Actress	Eliminated
3	EP.5	Balloon	แทงข้างหลัง..ทะลุถึงหัวใจ	Undisclosed		Advanced to Semi-Final
4	EP.5	Mermaid	First Love	Kratip Shawankorn	Actress	Eliminated
4	EP.5	Grass Flower	ดาว	Undisclosed		Advanced to Semi-Final

=== Group C ===
Order	Episode	Stage Name	Song	Identity	Profession	Result
1	EP.7	Psychopomp	ยิ่งสูงยิ่งหนาว	Jasan Young	Actor, Singer	Eliminated
1	EP.7	Bee	เจ็บละเนาะ	Undisclosed		Advanced to Semi-Final
2	EP.7	Chinese Lion Dancer	กลับไม่ได้ ไปไม่ถึง	Undisclosed		Advanced to Semi-Final
2	EP.7	Banana	ขอให้เหมือนเดิม	Art Phasut	Actor	Eliminated
3	EP.8	Coconut	ชาวนากับงูเห่า	Ord Keereeboon	Singer, Musician, Song Writer	Eliminated
3	EP.8	Wizard	Writing's on the Wall	Undisclosed		Advanced to Semi-Final
4	EP.8	Dolphin	คำขอสุดท้าย	Nak Charlie	Actor, Voice actor, TV Host, Model	Eliminated
4	EP.8	Giant	Because of You	Undisclosed		Advanced to Semi-Final

=== Group D ===
Order	Episode	Stage Name	Song	Identity	Profession	Result
1	EP.10	Radio	รถของเล่น	Undisclosed		Advanced to Semi-Final
1	EP.10	White Horse	คึกคักบ่อยเลย	Too Direk	Singer, Actor	Eliminated
2	EP.10	Chick	อีกหน่อยเธอคงเข้าใจ	Peck Zeal	Singer, Musician	Eliminated
2	EP.10	Iron Bear	Somebody to Love	Undisclosed		Advanced to Semi-Final
3	EP.11	Ant	หัวร้อน	Undisclosed		Advanced to Semi-Final
3	EP.11	Chinese Opera Singer	ยิ่งใกล้ยิ่งเจ็บ	Se-Na Ling	Actor, Host	Eliminated
4	EP.11	Tree	Someone like You	Praew Kanitkul	Singer, Actress, Host, DJ	Eliminated
4	EP.11	Hunter	Radioactive	Undisclosed		Advanced to Semi-Final

== Semi-final ==
=== Group A ===
Order	Episode	Stage Name	Song	Identity	Profession	Result
1	EP.3	Goldfish	แพ้แล้วพาล	Jam Charratha	Singer, Actress	Eliminated
1	EP.3	Pirate	Stay With Me	Undisclosed		Advanced to Final
2	EP.3	Little Duck	เจ็บนิดเดียว	Undisclosed		Advanced to Final
2	EP.3	Cauliflower	ถอยดีกว่า	Tuk Yanee	Actress, Host	Eliminated

=== Group B ===
Order	Episode	Stage Name	Song	Identity	Profession	Result
1	EP.6	Panda	สองรัก	Undisclosed		Advanced to Final
1	EP.6	Cactus	เจ็บที่ต้องรู้	Bai-Fern Pasakorn	Actress	Eliminated
2	EP.6	Balloon	ไสว่าสิบ่ถิ่มกัน	Karn The Parkinson	Singer, Musician, Producer	Eliminated
2	EP.6	Grass Flower	MUSIC LOVER	Undisclosed		Advanced to Final

=== Group C ===
Order	Episode	Stage Name	Song	Identity	Profession	Result
1	EP.9	Bee	Stone Cold	Undisclosed		Advanced to Final
1	EP.9	Chinese Lion Dancer	เรื่องบนเตียง	Tong Pakaramai	Singer, Actress	Eliminated
2	EP.9	Wizard	ไม่มีเธอ	Ton Thanasit	Singer	Eliminated
2	EP.9	Giant	คนเจ้าน้ำตา	Undisclosed		Advanced to Final

=== Group D ===
Order	Episode	Stage Name	Song	Identity	Profession	Result
1	EP.12	Radio	ไม่เหมือนใคร (Unique)	Bell Supol	Singer, DJ	Eliminated
1	EP.12	Iron Bear	Let It Go	Undisclosed		Advanced to Final
2	EP.12	Ant	Dharmajāti (ดัม-มะ-ชา-ติ)	Cee Siwat	Actor, Model, Host, DJ, Singer	Eliminated
2	EP.12	Hunter	ห้องสุดท้าย	Undisclosed		Advanced to Final

== Final ==
Group	Episode	Stage Name	Song	Identity	Profession	Result
A	EP.13	Pirate	สัญญาเมื่อสายัณห์	Nam Ronnadet	Singer, Musician, Actor	Eliminated
A	EP.13	Little Duck	อยู่ตรงนี้	Undisclosed		Advanced to Champ VS Champ
A	EP.13	Duet: ช่วงนี้ (Karma)				
B	EP.14	Panda	แม่เกี่ยว	UrboyTJ	Rapper, Singer, Music Judge	Eliminated
B	EP.14	Grass Flower	คู่ชีวิต	Undisclosed		Advanced to Champ VS Champ
B	EP.14	Duet: มาทำไม				
C	EP.15	Bee	Sweet Dreams	Undisclosed		Advanced to Champ VS Champ
C	EP.15	Giant	Nothin' on You	Timethai	Singer, Actor	Eliminated
C	EP.15	Duet: ไม่มีใคร				
D	EP.16	Iron Bear	Beat It	Undisclosed		Advanced to Champ VS Champ
D	EP.16	Hunter	เป็นเพราะฝน (Teardrops)	Max Jenmana	Singer, Musician, Song Writer, Actor, DJ	Eliminated
D	EP.16	Duet: คนไม่จำเป็น				

== Champ VS Champ ==
=== First round ===
Episode	Champ from group	Stage Name	Song	Identity	Profession	Result
EP.17	A	Little Duck	กลับคำสาหล่า	Undisclosed		Advanced to Second Round
EP.17	B	Grass Flower	ยอมรับคนเดียว	Poppy Prachyaluck	Singer	Eliminated
EP.17	C	Bee	คิดถึง	Undisclosed		Advanced to Second Round
EP.17	D	Iron Bear	เสร็จแล้ว	Undisclosed		Advanced to Second Round
EP.17	Group song: ไม่มีใครรู้					

=== Second round ===
Episode	Champ from group	Stage Name	Song	Identity	Profession	Result
EP.18	A	Little Duck	จันทร์เจ้า	Undisclosed		Advanced to Champ of the Champ
EP.18	C	Bee	นักร้องบ้านนอก	Undisclosed		Advanced to Champ of the Champ
EP.18	D	Iron Bear	Say Anything	Palm Instinct	Singer	Eliminated
EP.18	Group song: กระแซะเข้ามาซิ					

== Champ of the Champ ==
Episode	Champ from group	Stage Name	Song	Identity	Profession	Result
EP.19	A	Little Duck	รักเธอทั้งหมดของหัวใจ	Nont Tanont	Singer	Champion
EP.19	C	Bee	แลรักนิรันดร์กาล	New Napatsorn	Singer	Runner-up
EP.19	Duet: Too Much So Much Very Much					

== Celebration of The Mask Champion ==
Episode	Song	Stage Name
EP.20	ชีวิตเป็นของเรา	Little Duck, Green Tea Worm
EP.20	แค่คนโทรผิด	Green Tea Worm, Apple, Giant
EP.20	เรื่องที่ขอ	Bee, Grass Flower
EP.20	จิ๊จ๊ะ	Black Crow, Iron Bear
EP.20	วัดใจ	Black Crow, Iron Bear
EP.20	Havana	Pony, Giant
EP.20	รอพี่ก่อน	Apple, Hunter
EP.20	สาวบางโพ	White Horse, Apple, Giant, Pony, Hunter
EP.20	พรหมลิขิต	All the mask in season 1,3 and 4

== Elimination table ==
Contestant	Identity	Ep.1	Ep.2	Ep.3	Ep.4	Ep.5	Ep.6	Ep.7	Ep.8	Ep.9	Ep.10	Ep.11	Ep.12	Ep.13	Ep.14	Ep.15	Ep.16	Ep.17	Ep.18	Ep.19
Little Duck	Nont Tanont	—N/a	WIN	WIN	—N/a	—N/a	—N/a	—N/a	—N/a	—N/a	—N/a	—N/a	—N/a	WIN	—N/a	—N/a	—N/a	SAFE	SAFE	Winner
Bee	New Napatsorn	—N/a	—N/a	—N/a	—N/a	—N/a	—N/a	WIN	—N/a	WIN	—N/a	—N/a	—N/a	—N/a	—N/a	WIN	—N/a	SAFE	SAFE	Runner-up
Iron Bear	Palm Instinct	—N/a	—N/a	—N/a	—N/a	—N/a	—N/a	—N/a	—N/a	—N/a	WIN	—N/a	WIN	—N/a	—N/a	—N/a	WIN	SAFE	OUT	
Grass Flower	Poppy Prachyaluk	—N/a	—N/a	—N/a	—N/a	WIN	WIN	—N/a	—N/a	—N/a	—N/a	—N/a	—N/a	—N/a	WIN	—N/a	—N/a	OUT		
Hunter	Max Jenmana	—N/a	—N/a	—N/a	—N/a	—N/a	—N/a	—N/a	—N/a	—N/a	—N/a	WIN	WIN	—N/a	—N/a	—N/a	OUT			
Giant	Timethai	—N/a	—N/a	—N/a	—N/a	—N/a	—N/a	—N/a	WIN	WIN	—N/a	—N/a	—N/a	—N/a	—N/a	OUT				
Panda	UrboyTJ	—N/a	—N/a	—N/a	WIN	—N/a	WIN	—N/a	—N/a	—N/a	—N/a	—N/a	—N/a	—N/a	OUT					
Pirate	Nam Ronnadet	WIN	—N/a	WIN	—N/a	—N/a	—N/a	—N/a	—N/a	—N/a	—N/a	—N/a	—N/a	OUT						
Ant	Cee Siwat	—N/a	—N/a	—N/a	—N/a	—N/a	—N/a	—N/a	—N/a	—N/a	—N/a	WIN	OUT							
Radio	Bell Supol	—N/a	—N/a	—N/a	—N/a	—N/a	—N/a	—N/a	—N/a	—N/a	WIN	—N/a	OUT							
Tree	Praew Kanitkul	—N/a	—N/a	—N/a	—N/a	—N/a	—N/a	—N/a	—N/a	—N/a	—N/a	OUT								
Chinese Opera Singer	Se-Na Ling	—N/a	—N/a	—N/a	—N/a	—N/a	—N/a	—N/a	—N/a	—N/a	—N/a	OUT								
Chick	Peck Zeal	—N/a	—N/a	—N/a	—N/a	—N/a	—N/a	—N/a	—N/a	—N/a	OUT									
White Horse	Too Direk	—N/a	—N/a	—N/a	—N/a	—N/a	—N/a	—N/a	—N/a	—N/a	OUT									
Wizard	Ton Thanasit	—N/a	—N/a	—N/a	—N/a	—N/a	—N/a	—N/a	WIN	OUT										
Chinese Lion Dancer	Tong Pakaramai	—N/a	—N/a	—N/a	—N/a	—N/a	—N/a	WIN	—N/a	OUT										
Dolphin	Nak Charlie	—N/a	—N/a	—N/a	—N/a	—N/a	—N/a	—N/a	OUT											
Coconut	Ord Keereeboon	—N/a	—N/a	—N/a	—N/a	—N/a	—N/a	—N/a	OUT											
Banana	Art Phasut	—N/a	—N/a	—N/a	—N/a	—N/a	—N/a	OUT												
Psychopomp	Jasan Young	—N/a	—N/a	—N/a	—N/a	—N/a	—N/a	OUT												
Balloon	Karn The Parkinson	—N/a	—N/a	—N/a	—N/a	WIN	OUT													
Cactus	Bai-Fern Pasakorn	—N/a	—N/a	—N/a	WIN	—N/a	OUT													
Mermaid	Kratip Shawankorn	—N/a	—N/a	—N/a	—N/a	OUT														
Gunman	Padthai	—N/a	—N/a	—N/a	—N/a	OUT														
Tiger	Somjit Jonjohor	—N/a	—N/a	—N/a	OUT															
Robot	Noom Attaporn	—N/a	—N/a	—N/a	OUT															
Cauliflower	Tuk Yanee	—N/a	WIN	OUT																
Goldfish	Jam Charratha	WIN	—N/a	OUT																
Angel	Natacha Satjakul	—N/a	OUT																	
Pigeon	Yak Thapanee	—N/a	OUT																	
Puppet	Ping Lumprapleng	OUT																		
Jackfruit	Lift Supoj	OUT																		

This contestant won the battle and moves on to the next round.
This contestant is safe from elimination.
This contestant is eliminated.
