= The Mask Singer (Thai TV series) season 3 =

The Mask Singer
- Season 3
- Presented by: Kan Kantathavorn
- No. of episodes: 20

Release
- Original network: Workpoint TV
- Original release: 7 September 2017 – 1 February 2018

Season chronology
- ← Previous; Season 2 Next → Season 4

The Mask Singer Season 3 (Thai: The Mask Singer หน้ากากนักร้อง ซีซันที่ 3) is a Thai singing competition program presented by Kan Kantathavorn. It aired on Workpoint TV on Thursday at 20:15 from 7 September 2017 to 1 February 2018.

== Panel of Judges ==
| No. | Name | Profession |
|---|---|---|
| 1 | Maneenuch Smerasut | Singing Teacher |
| 2 | Jakkawal Saothongyuttitum | Music Producer, Composer |
| 3 | Yuttana Boon-Orm | Music Company Executive |
| 4 | Siriporn Yooyord | Singer, Comedian |
| 5 | Kiattisak Udomnark | Presenter |
| 6 | Thanawat Prasitsomporn | DJ |
| 7 | Nalin Hohler | Singer, Actress |
| 8 | Kapol Thongplub | DJ, Presenter |
| 9 | Seo Ji-yeon | Singer, Actress |
| 10 | Puttachat Pongsuchat | DJ, Actress |
| 11 | Apissada Kreurkongka | Actress, Model |
| 12 | Saksit Vejsupaporn | Singer, Pianist |
| 13 | Sireeporn Yoogthatat | Actors, Presenters |
| 14 | Nattawut Srimork | Rapper, Songwriter |
| 15 | Issara Kitnitchi | Singer |
| 16 | Pidsanu Nimsakul | Singer, Actor |
| 17 | Supachai Srivijit | Actor-manager, Actor |

== First round ==
=== Group A ===
| Order | Episode | Stage Name | Song | Identity | Profession | Result |
|---|---|---|---|---|---|---|
| 1 | EP.1 | Insect | เพื่อเธอ | Undisclosed | | Advanced to Semi-Final |
| 1 | EP.1 | Macaw | 千言万语 | Pinky Savika | Actress, Model, Singer | Eliminated |
| 2 | EP.1 | Polar Bear | 昴 | Oak Smith Arayasakul | Dermatologist, Singer, Host | Eliminated |
| 2 | EP.1 | Leopard | Love | Undisclosed | | Advanced to Semi-Final |
| 3 | EP.2 | Rock | พูดลาสักคำ | Pu Blackhead | Singer, Musician, Songwriter, Actor | Eliminated |
| 3 | EP.2 | Apple | อย่าพูดเลย | Undisclosed | | Advanced to Semi-Final |
| 4 | EP.2 | Cherry Blossom | Dangerous Woman | Undisclosed | | Advanced to Semi-Final |
| 4 | EP.2 | Ninja | เพียงกระซิบ | Te Utain | Singer | Eliminated |

=== Group B ===
| Order | Episode | Stage Name | Song | Identity | Profession | Result |
|---|---|---|---|---|---|---|
| 1 | EP.4 | Iyara | One-Sided Love Affair | Somlek Somchai | Actor, Artist, Voice actor | Eliminated |
| 1 | EP.4 | Bed | You Are My Everything | Undisclosed | | Advanced to Semi-Final |
| 2 | EP.4 | Mirror | Proud Mary | Eve Puttatida | Actress, Singer, Presenter | Eliminated |
| 2 | EP.4 | Green Tea Worm | แม่สาย | Undisclosed | | Advanced to Semi-Final |
| 3 | EP.5 | Clock | The Music of the Night | Fluke Krirkphol | Actor, Singer, Presenter | Eliminated |
| 3 | EP.5 | Frog Prince | Man in the Mirror | Undisclosed | | Advanced to Semi-Final |
| 4 | EP.5 | Joker | Bad Romance | Sukanya Migael | Singer, Model | Eliminated |
| 4 | EP.5 | Pancake | Sometimes I Cry | Undisclosed | | Advanced to Semi-Final |

=== Group C ===
| Order | Episode | Stage Name | Song | Identity | Profession | Result |
|---|---|---|---|---|---|---|
| 1 | EP.7 | Unicorn | Sorry | Undisclosed | | Advanced to Semi-Final |
| 1 | EP.7 | Wolf | กอดฉันไว้ | Kao Jirayu | Actor, Singer | Eliminated |
| 2 | EP.7 | Slow Loris | เสมอ | Undisclosed | | Advanced to Semi-Final |
| 2 | EP.7 | Fighting Cock | Love Yourself | Antoine Pinto | Kickboxer | Eliminated |
| 3 | EP.8 | Candle | Sunday Morning | Chin Chinawut | Singer, Actor, Soldier | Eliminated |
| 3 | EP.8 | Diamond Crown | Titanium | Undisclosed | | Advanced to Semi-Final |
| 4 | EP.8 | Ice Cream | ความซื่อสัตย์ | Jak-Jaan Akhamsiri | Actress | Eliminated |
| 4 | EP.8 | Doll | Maria | Undisclosed | | Advanced to Semi-Final |

=== Group D ===
| Order | Episode | Stage Name | Song | Identity | Profession | Result |
|---|---|---|---|---|---|---|
| 1 | EP.10 | Moonwalk | ตะลึง | Tom Yuthlert | Film Director, Film Producer, Screenwriter | Eliminated |
| 1 | EP.10 | Black Elephant | แสนรัก | Undisclosed | | Advanced to Semi-Final |
| 2 | EP.10 | Native Indian | สักวันหนึ่ง | Kwang Kamolchanok | Actress, Singer | Eliminated |
| 2 | EP.10 | Squirrel | ถ่านไฟเก่า | Undisclosed | | Advanced to Semi-Final |
| 3 | EP.11 | Hornbill | Pegasus Fantasy | Yong Armchair | Singer, Musician | Eliminated |
| 3 | EP.11 | Moon | Hava Nagila | Undisclosed | | Advanced to Semi-Final |
| 4 | EP.11 | Alien | Treasure | Joni Anwar | Singer, Actor | Eliminated |
| 4 | EP.11 | Red Crow | ปล่อยฉัน | Undisclosed | | Advanced to Semi-Final |

== Semi-final ==
=== Group A ===
| Order | Episode | Stage Name | Song | Identity | Profession | Result |
|---|---|---|---|---|---|---|
| 1 | EP.3 | Insect | Sweet Child o' Mine | P-Saderd | Singer, Actor | Eliminated |
| 1 | EP.3 | Leopard | Hush Hush; Hush Hush | Undisclosed | | Advanced to Final |
| 2 | EP.3 | Apple | ยื้อ | Undisclosed | | Advanced to Final |
| 2 | EP.3 | Cherry Blossom | คิดฮอด | Sandra Bounxouei | Singer, Actress | Eliminated |

=== Group B ===
| Order | Episode | Stage Name | Song | Identity | Profession | Result |
|---|---|---|---|---|---|---|
| 1 | EP.6 | Bed | Jailhouse Rock | Image Suthita | Singer | Eliminated |
| 1 | EP.6 | Green Tea Worm | พลังงานจน | Undisclosed | | Advanced to Final |
| 2 | EP.6 | Frog Prince | ขอ | Two Popethorn | Singer, Songwriter, Actor | Eliminated |
| 2 | EP.6 | Pancake | ปล่อย | Undisclosed | | Advanced to Final |

=== Group C ===
| Order | Episode | Stage Name | Song | Identity | Profession | Result |
|---|---|---|---|---|---|---|
| 1 | EP.9 | Unicorn | ไถ่เธอคืนมา | Tae Bhurit | Businessman, Singer | Eliminated |
| 1 | EP.9 | Slow Loris | Rehab | Undisclosed | | Advanced to Final |
| 2 | EP.9 | Diamond Crown | ต่อหน้าฉัน (เธอทำอย่างนั้นได้อย่างไร) | Undisclosed | | Advanced to Final |
| 2 | EP.9 | Doll | ฉันจะรอเธอ | Knom-Jean | Singer, Actress | Eliminated |

=== Group D ===
| Order | Episode | Stage Name | Song | Identity | Profession | Result |
|---|---|---|---|---|---|---|
| 1 | EP.12 | Black Elephant | โปรดเถิดดวงใจ | Gun Napat | Singer, Actor | Eliminated |
| 1 | EP.12 | Squirrel | ตัวร้ายที่รักเธอ | Undisclosed | | Advanced to Final |
| 2 | EP.12 | Moon | สายโลหิต | Q Flure | Singer, Actor | Eliminated |
| 2 | EP.12 | Red Crow | In the End | Undisclosed | | Advanced to Final |

== Final ==
| Group | Episode | Stage Name | Song | Identity | Profession | Result |
|---|---|---|---|---|---|---|
| A | EP.13 | Leopard | When You Tell Me That You Love Me | Meeya | Model, Actress, Singer | Eliminated |
| A | EP.13 | Apple | สุดใจ | Undisclosed | | Advanced to Champ VS Champ |
| A | EP.13 | Duet: ผู้สาวขาเลาะ | | | | |
| B | EP.14 | Green Tea Worm | Despacito | Undisclosed | | Advanced to Champ VS Champ |
| B | EP.14 | Pancake | That's What I Like | Nueng ETC | Singer, Drummer | Eliminated |
| B | EP.14 | Duet: มือลั่น | | | | |
| C | EP.15 | Diamond Crown | Symphony | Gam Wichayanee | Singer, Actress, Voice actress, Host, Music Judge | Eliminated |
| C | EP.15 | Slow Loris | วิญญาณ | Undisclosed | | Advanced to Champ VS Champ |
| C | EP.15 | Duet: เพียงรัก | | | | |
| D | EP.16 | Squirrel | See You Again | Ice Saranyu | Singer, Actor, Voice Actor | Eliminated |
| D | EP.16 | Red Crow | มุมมืด | Undisclosed | | Advanced to Champ VS Champ |
| D | EP.16 | Duet: ฝากเลี้ยง | | | | |

== Champ VS Champ ==
=== First round ===
| Episode | Champ from group | Stage Name | Song | Identity | Profession | Result |
|---|---|---|---|---|---|---|
| EP.17 | A | Apple | ฤดูที่ฉันเหงา | Undisclosed | | Advanced to Second Round |
| EP.17 | B | Green Tea Worm | คำแพง | Undisclosed | | Advanced to Second Round |
| EP.17 | C | Slow Loris | รุนแรงเหลือเกิน + Un-Break My Heart | Undisclosed | | Advanced to Second Round |
| EP.17 | D | Red Crow | ใส่ร้ายป้ายสี | Tar Mr. Team | Singer | Eliminated |
| EP.17 | Group song: เราและนาย | | | | | |

=== Second round ===
| Episode | Champ from group | Stage Name | Song | Identity | Profession | Result |
|---|---|---|---|---|---|---|
| EP.18 | A | Apple | รักคุณเข้าแล้ว | Oat Pramote | Singer, Presenter | Eliminated |
| EP.18 | B | Green Tea Worm | เรือเล็กควรออกจากฝั่ง | Undisclosed | | Advanced to Champ of the Champ |
| EP.18 | C | Slow Loris | รักคุณยิ่งกว่าใคร | Undisclosed | | Advanced to Champ of the Champ |
| EP.18 | Group song: โปรดส่งใครมารักฉันที | | | | | |

== Champ of the Champ ==
| Episode | Champ from group | Stage Name | Song | Identity | Profession | Result |
|---|---|---|---|---|---|---|
| EP.19 | B | Green Tea Worm | บางระจันวันเพ็ญ | Boy Peacemaker | Singer | Champion |
| EP.19 | C | Slow Loris | ทำได้เพียง | Atom Chanakan | Singer | Runner-up |
| EP.19 | Duet: มหาลัยวัวชน | | | | | |

== Celebration of The Mask Champion ==
| Episode | Song | Stage Name |
|---|---|---|
| EP.20 | Secret Love Song | Green Tea Worm and Sumo |
| EP.20 | แร้งคอย | Black Crow, White Crow, Red Crow |
| EP.20 | ทุ้มอยู่ในใจ | Wolf |
| EP.20 | ข้าง ๆ หัวใจ | Black Elephant |
| EP.20 | เธอคือใคร | Pancake |
| EP.20 | ปากไม่ตรงกับใจ | Candle |
| EP.20 | I Will Survive | Sumo, Leopard, Diamond Crown, Doll |
| EP.20 | Survivor | Sumo, Leopard, Diamond Crown, Doll |
| EP.20 | กรุณาฟังให้จบ | Green Tea Worm, Slow Loris, Apple, Squirrel |
| EP.20 | ลูกอม | boy peacemaker |

== Elimination table ==
| Contestant | Identity | Ep.1 | Ep.2 | Ep.3 | Ep.4 | Ep.5 | Ep.6 | Ep.7 | Ep.8 | Ep.9 | Ep.10 | Ep.11 | Ep.12 | Ep.13 | Ep.14 | Ep.15 | Ep.16 | Ep.17 | Ep.18 | Ep.19 |
|---|---|---|---|---|---|---|---|---|---|---|---|---|---|---|---|---|---|---|---|---|
| Green Tea Worm | Boy Peacemaker | —N/a | —N/a | —N/a | WIN | —N/a | WIN | —N/a | —N/a | —N/a | —N/a | —N/a | —N/a | —N/a | WIN | —N/a | —N/a | SAFE | SAFE | Winner |
| Slow Loris | Atom | —N/a | —N/a | —N/a | —N/a | —N/a | —N/a | WIN | —N/a | WIN | —N/a | —N/a | —N/a | —N/a | —N/a | WIN | —N/a | SAFE | SAFE | Runner-up |
| Apple | Oat Pramote | —N/a | WIN | WIN | —N/a | —N/a | —N/a | —N/a | —N/a | —N/a | —N/a | —N/a | —N/a | WIN | —N/a | —N/a | —N/a | SAFE | OUT | |
| Red Crow | Tar Mr. Team | —N/a | —N/a | —N/a | —N/a | —N/a | —N/a | —N/a | —N/a | —N/a | —N/a | WIN | WIN | —N/a | —N/a | —N/a | WIN | OUT | | |
| Squirrel | Ice Saranyu | —N/a | —N/a | —N/a | —N/a | —N/a | —N/a | —N/a | —N/a | —N/a | WIN | —N/a | WIN | —N/a | —N/a | —N/a | OUT | | | |
| Diamond Crown | Gam Wichayanee | —N/a | —N/a | —N/a | —N/a | —N/a | —N/a | —N/a | WIN | WIN | —N/a | —N/a | —N/a | —N/a | —N/a | OUT | | | | |
| Pancake | Nueng ETC | —N/a | —N/a | —N/a | —N/a | WIN | WIN | —N/a | —N/a | —N/a | —N/a | —N/a | —N/a | —N/a | OUT | | | | | |
| Leopard | Meeya | WIN | —N/a | WIN | —N/a | —N/a | —N/a | —N/a | —N/a | —N/a | —N/a | —N/a | —N/a | OUT | | | | | | |
| Moon | Q Flure | —N/a | —N/a | —N/a | —N/a | —N/a | —N/a | —N/a | —N/a | —N/a | —N/a | WIN | OUT | | | | | | | |
| Black Elephant | Gun Napat | —N/a | —N/a | —N/a | —N/a | —N/a | —N/a | —N/a | —N/a | —N/a | WIN | —N/a | OUT | | | | | | | |
| Alien | Joni Anwar | —N/a | —N/a | —N/a | —N/a | —N/a | —N/a | —N/a | —N/a | —N/a | —N/a | OUT | | | | | | | | |
| Hornbill | Yong Armchair | —N/a | —N/a | —N/a | —N/a | —N/a | —N/a | —N/a | —N/a | —N/a | —N/a | OUT | | | | | | | | |
| Native Indian | Kwang Kamolchanok | —N/a | —N/a | —N/a | —N/a | —N/a | —N/a | —N/a | —N/a | —N/a | OUT | | | | | | | | | |
| Moonwalk | Tom Yuthlert | —N/a | —N/a | —N/a | —N/a | —N/a | —N/a | —N/a | —N/a | —N/a | OUT | | | | | | | | | |
| Doll | Knom-Jean | —N/a | —N/a | —N/a | —N/a | —N/a | —N/a | —N/a | WIN | OUT | | | | | | | | | | |
| Unicorn | Tae Bhurit | —N/a | —N/a | —N/a | —N/a | —N/a | —N/a | WIN | —N/a | OUT | | | | | | | | | | |
| Ice Cream | Jak-Jaan Akhamsiri | —N/a | —N/a | —N/a | —N/a | —N/a | —N/a | —N/a | OUT | | | | | | | | | | | |
| Candle | Chin Chinawut | —N/a | —N/a | —N/a | —N/a | —N/a | —N/a | —N/a | OUT | | | | | | | | | | | |
| Fighting Cock | Antoine Pinto | —N/a | —N/a | —N/a | —N/a | —N/a | —N/a | OUT | | | | | | | | | | | | |
| Wolf | Kao Jirayu | —N/a | —N/a | —N/a | —N/a | —N/a | —N/a | OUT | | | | | | | | | | | | |
| Frog Prince | Two Popetorn | —N/a | —N/a | —N/a | —N/a | WIN | OUT | | | | | | | | | | | | | |
| Bed | Image Suthita | —N/a | —N/a | —N/a | WIN | —N/a | OUT | | | | | | | | | | | | | |
| Joker | Sukanya Migael | —N/a | —N/a | —N/a | —N/a | OUT | | | | | | | | | | | | | | |
| Clock | Fluke Kirkphol | —N/a | —N/a | —N/a | —N/a | OUT | | | | | | | | | | | | | | |
| Mirror | Eve Puttatida | —N/a | —N/a | —N/a | OUT | | | | | | | | | | | | | | | |
| Iyara | Somlek Somchai | —N/a | —N/a | —N/a | OUT | | | | | | | | | | | | | | | |
| Cherry Blossom | Sandra Bounxouei | —N/a | WIN | OUT | | | | | | | | | | | | | | | | |
| Insect | P-Saderd | WIN | —N/a | OUT | | | | | | | | | | | | | | | | |
| Ninja | Te Utain | —N/a | OUT | | | | | | | | | | | | | | | | | |
| Rock | Pu Blackhead | —N/a | OUT | | | | | | | | | | | | | | | | | |
| Polar Bear | Oak Smith | OUT | | | | | | | | | | | | | | | | | | |
| Macaw | Pinky Savika | OUT | | | | | | | | | | | | | | | | | | |

This contestant won the battle and moves on to the next round.
This contestant is safe from elimination.
This contestant is eliminated.
