= Sunaree Ratchasima =

- สุนารี ราชสีมา
- Born: Tim Sonna (Thai: ทิม สอนนา); March 16, 1968 (age 58); Nakhon Ratchasima Province, Thailand
- Occupation: Singer
- Musical career
- Genres: Luk thung; Pop; Country blues; Ballad
- Years active: 1980s-Present

Sunaree Ratchasima (Thai: สุนารี ราชสีมา; born March 16, 1968) is a famous Thai Luk thung singer.

== Early life ==
Sonna (Thai: ทิม สอนนา) was born in Nakhon Ratchasima Province, to Thin and Yom Sonna.

She married Walther Deloft, a Dutch man on December 18, 2019.

== Career ==
She entered a singing contest to help her family and to escape her job as a poorly-paid tailor. In 1983, she became a contestant in the TV show Chum Thang Kon Den (Thai: ชุมทางคนเด่น) by Channel 7 and became a runner-up; Suksan Hansa liked her music tone so she supported her.

She recorded her first album La Khorat (Thai: ลาโคราช), but it failed to become popular. She joined Sure Entertainment, and recorded her second album Sud Thai Thee Krung Thep, directed by Chonlathee Thanthong which became a success. She has recorded many albums and appeared in films.

== Discography ==
=== Albums ===
- "Sud Thai Thee Krung Thep" (สุดท้ายที่กรุงเทพ)
- "Eek Nid Si" (อีกนิดซิ)
- "Bao Bao Si" (เบาๆ ซิ)
- "Khong Fak Jak Ban Nok" (ของฝากจากบ้านอก)
- "Thang Sai Mai" (ทางสายใหม่)
- "Raiyan Jak Huajai" (รายงานจากหัวใจ)
- "Jep Toe" (จีบต่อ)
- "Tham Pen Kuean" (ทำเป็นเขิน)
- "Thee Kao Soay Dueam" (ที่เก่าซอยเดิม)
- "Fon Nao Sao Kruan" (ฝนหนาวสาวครวญ)
- "Lakorn Bot Cham" (ละครบทช้ำ)
- "Thee Pueng Thang Jai" (ที่พึ่งทางใจ)
- "Manee Ploi Roy Saeng" (มณีพลอยร้อยแสง)

=== Popular Music ===
- "Sud Thai Thee Krung Thep"
- "Krab Thao Ya Moe"
- "Klab Bai Tham Miea Doo Khon"
- "Motorcy Nung San"
- "Mue Tue Mai Fai Song Naa"
- "Jam Sieang Lieang Phoe"

== Filmography ==
- 2012 – Tom Yam Lam Sing – role Rungrawee's mother.
- 2013 – Mr Banna – role Jimmy's mother.
- 2014 – Malee Rueang Raba" – role Cookwoman.
- 2017 – Rak Long Loaeng – role Massi.
- 2018 – Sao Noy Roi Moe – role Cham.
