= Tanont Chumroen =

Thai pop singer (born 1996)

Tanont Chumroen ธนนท์ จำเริญ
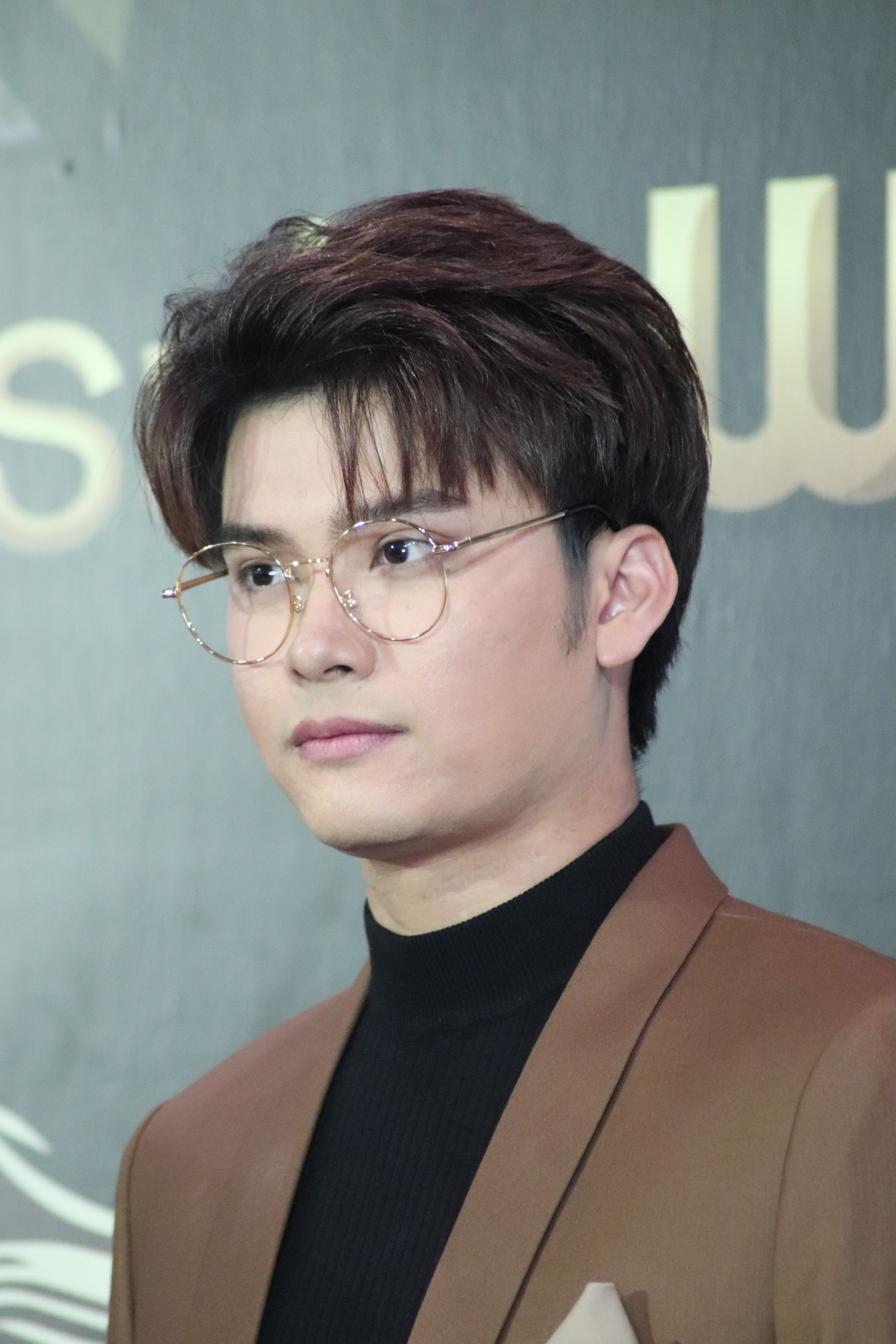
- Nont Tanont in April 2022

Background information
- Born: 4 March 1996 (age 30); Phuket, Thailand
- Genres: Thai pop, R&B, Soul
- Occupations: Singer, Actor, Model, Streamer, YouTuber, Comedian
- Instrument: Singing
- Years active: 2012–present
- Label: LOVEiS Entertainment
- Website: Official website

Tanont Chumroen, better known by his nickname Nont, is a Thai singer and actor. A native of Phuket, he graduated from Bangkok University in 2013. In 2012, he won the first season of The Voice Thailand, where he began establishing a large following. In 2018, he won the 4th season of The Mask Singer.

== Early life ==
Tanont Chumroen is the youngest child of his family with one older brother. He finished Elementary and Lower Secondary Education from Ban Samkong Municipal School in Phuket Province. After the Voice Thailand Singing Contest, he moved to continue his school in Secondary Education Grade 4 at Sarasas Pittaya School, Bangkok, in 2013. He graduated from Bangkok University, Faculty of Communication Arts, in major Radio and Television Broadcasting.

== Career ==
Nont Tanont began singing at an early age. In his Elementary Education years, he already sang for the school rural band, “Samkong Super Dance,” Ban Samkong Municipal School, Phuket Province. When he was 11 (Elementary School Grade 5), he participated in “Ti Sip,” a famous television program representing “Dun Dara,” a blind audition for shining new star section, singing the song "Huk Kun Bo Dai Dok." During Lower Secondary Education years, Tanont started to take lessons to sing in Pop style, and played drums set as a hobby in a band he assembled with a circle of friends, namely “Sicma,” “Limit,” “Ballad” and “Rifle”, in Phuket Province where they performed and participated in various contests. In 2012, Nont participated in The Voice Thailand Season 1 where he won the championship and stepped into entertainment circle.

== Awards and achievements ==
• 2013 received Highly Gratitude and Respect of Sibling to Mother Award, bestowed by the Council for Social Welfare for 2013

• 2013 Popular New Artist Award from PlayPark Music Awards 2013

• 2014 Seed Popular Artist of the Year Award from Seed Awards 9th Edition[2]

• 2015 Seed Popular Artist of the Year Award from Seed Awards 10th Edition[3] [4]

• 2016 Asanhapucha Buddhist Ambassador – Entering Buddhist Lent 2016 as Buddhist Promoting Artist, and as a speaker in a Dharma Establishment Program for Monk Novices from the Artist Council for Buddhism Promotion of Thailand

• 2017 Male Popular Artist Awards of Kazz Awards 2017

• 2017 CLEO Popular Vote Awards of CLEO 50 Most Eligible Bachelors 2017

• 2019 “Top Male Singing Artist of the Year 2018 Award” from Daradaily Awards 8th Edition[5]

• 2019 Honorary Youth Master Award in Motivation Builder, from Thailand Master Youth 2/2019, Honorary Youth Announcement of the Year [6]

• 2019 The Best Asian Artist Thailand Award from 2019 Mnet Asian Music Awards (MAMA)[7]

• 2019 Male Mass Popular Singing Artist Award of the Year from Nagaraj Awards 4th Edition[8]

• 2020 Popular Vote Award in Popular New-style Thai Artist, Kom Chad Luek Awards 16th Edition

• 2020 Remake Song of the Year Award from JOOX Thailand Music Awards 2020[10] (“Muen Kam La” Song)

• 2020 Male Popular Artist Awards from Kazz Awards 2020[11]

• 2020 Best Theme Song of Title Theme (“Khon Khang Khang Thi Rak Thur” Song Ost. My Bubble Tea)

• 2020 Popular New-style Thai Song Award from MAYA Awards 2020[12]

• 2021 Popular New-style Thai Song Award from D Online Awards 2021

• 2021 Best Original Song a TV Series/Program or Movie Award from Content Asia Awards 2021 (“Chuey Klub Ma Kuan Jai” (Please Come Back To Me)) Ost. “Trab Fa Mee Tawan” (My Forever Sunshine)[13]

• 2021 Popular Male Artist Award from Kazz Awards 2021

• 2021 Popular Male New-style Thai Artist Award from Suan Dusit Poll

• 2022 Popular Male New-style Thai Artist Award(“Nae Jai Mai” Song)[JOOX Original] from Sanook Sood Jad 2021 by Sanook – Sanook Dot Com

• 2022 Best Entertainment Performance on Social Media Award in Male Artist from Thailand Zocial Awards 2022[14]

• 2022 Best Music of the Year Award (Ost.) “Ping” A song from “Krachau Sida” TV Series from TOTY Music Awards 2021

• 2022 New-style Thai Song Category in Top Male Solo Artist Award from Khom Chad Luek Awards 18th Edition

• 2022 Pop Song of the Year Award “Ping” Ost. “Krachau Sida” TV Series from Joox Thailand Music Awards 2022 (JTMA 2022)

• 2022 Song of the Year Award “Ping” Ost. “Krachau Sida” TV Series from Joox Thailand Music Awards 2022 (JTMA 2022)

• 2022 HOWE Best Male Singer Award 2022 from 10th Anniversary HOWE Awards 2022 by HOWE Magazine Bangkok

• 2022 Best Male Artist of The Year from 20th Year Anniversary The Guitar Mag Awards 2022

== Opportunity for Runner Up Position ==
• 2013 Seed Popular Artist of the Year Award from Seed Awards 8th Edition[15]

• 2013 Seed Popular Artist of the Year Award from Seed Awards 8th Edition

• 2013 Male Newcomer Artist Award from Kazz Awards 2013

• 2014 New Wave Award from The Guitar Mag Awards 2014

• 2014 Male Popular Artist Award from Kazz Awards 2014

• 2014 Highest Rising of the Year Award from Bang Music Awards 2014

• 2014 Favorite New Artist Award from You2Play Awards 2014

• 2015 Best Solo Artist Award from Bang Music Awards 2015

• 2016 Popular New-style Thai Artist Award, Popular Vote 2015

• 2020 Thailand Zocial Awards 2020 in Male Artist (Finalists)

• 2022 Best Entertainment Performance on Social Media in Song: “Ping” – NONT TANONT (The Finalists) from Thailand Zocial Awards 2022
