= Seo Ji-yeon (actress) =

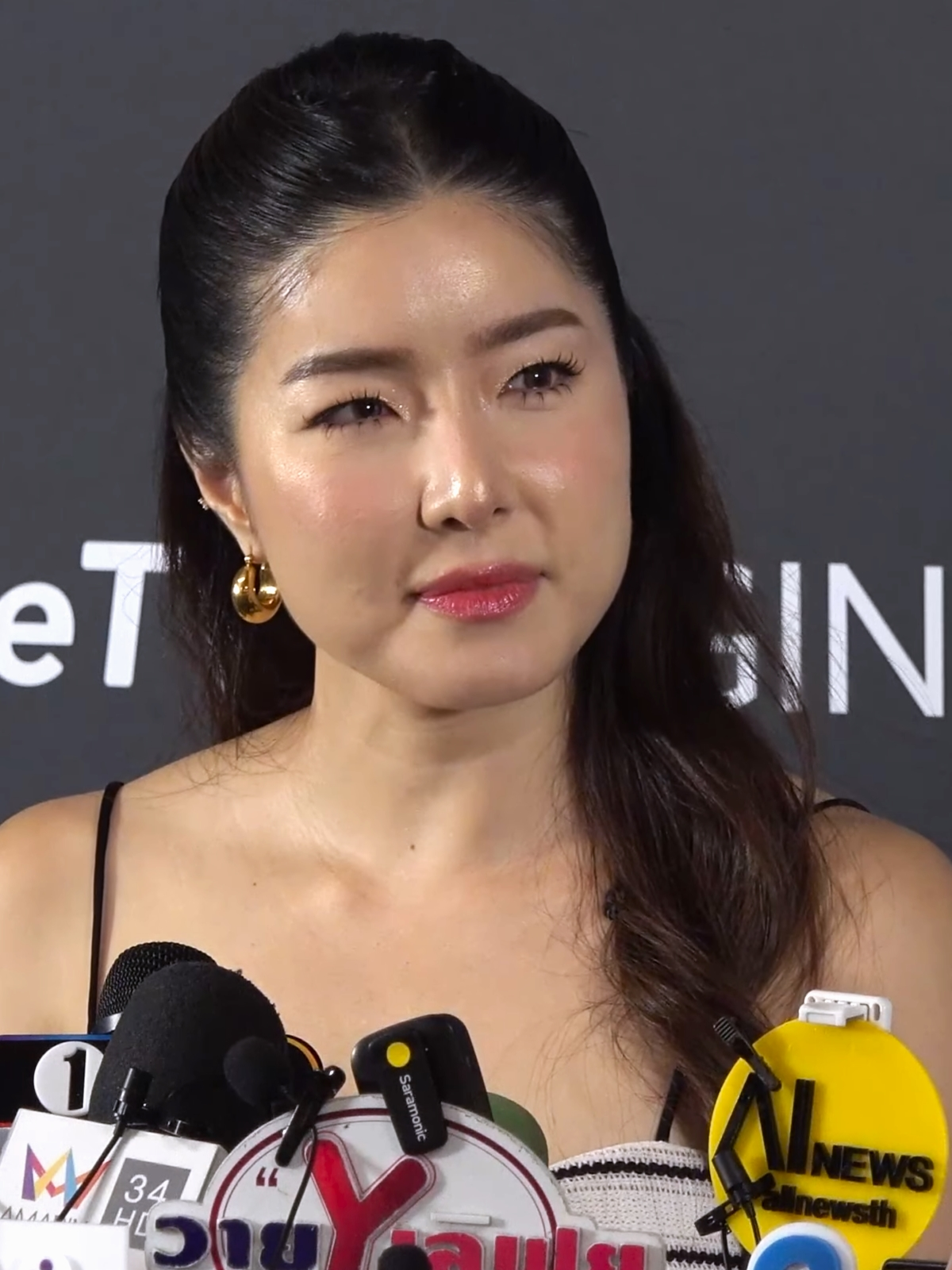
- Seo in 2024

Background information
- Born: Seo Ji-yeon; November 11, 1986 (age 39); Daejeon South Korea
- Genres: Pop, R&B
- Occupations: Singer; actress; model; host; Youtuber
- Years active: 2009–present
- Labels: Exact; GMM Grammy

Seo Ji-yeon (Korean: 서지연; born 11 November 1986) is a South Korean actress, singer, and model.

== Early life ==
Seo was born in South Korea. The name "Ji-yeon" was given by her maternal grandfather.

At age 11, Seo moved to Thailand after her father moved there to work. She lives with her father, mother, older brother, and younger sister.

After settling in Thailand, Seo completed her secondary education at Ruamrudee International School. She was bullied by her school friends because she couldn't speak either Thai or English. She became discouraged and wanted to return to her homeland, but constant encouragement from her father, helped her to get through it.

Seo graduated with a bachelor's degree from the Faculty of Liberal Arts, Assumption University, majoring in Business Japanese.

While studying at Ruamrudee International School, she was an MC at school events and participated in school activities and received many awards.

== Career ==
Seo began her career in entertainment when a friend invited her to watch the show Five Live at GMM Grammy Place. The Grammy staff noticed Seo and invited her to audition. At that time, she was not fluent in Thai, so her first job was modeling, shooting commercials, and acting in music videos.

Later, Pitchaya and Phirat Nitipaisankul, two brothers who were friends at Ruamrudee International School and were artists under GMM Grammy under the name Golf-Mike, introduced her to a GMM Grammy music producer who had Jiyeon perform a singing audition. Nitiphong Honark, a famous songwriter and former band leader of Chaliang, heard about it and liked it. When hey met he expressed his desire to write a song for her. After that, Seo received singing training from Honark. Later, Takonkiet Viravan, a Grammy executive and founder of Exact, a subsidiary of Grammy, listened to Seo's recording of "Chan Mai Mee Tee Pai" and was interested. When he met Seo, he was impressed and so Seo got a job with Exact.
