= Thanawat Prasitsomporn =

- Born: June 26, 1983 (age 42); Mueang Kanchanaburi, Kanchanaburi province, Thailand
- Other name: Nui
- Education: University of the Thai Chamber of Commerce (Faculty of Communication Arts)
- Occupations: DJ, actor, voice actor, YouTuber, host, news anchor
- Agent: A-Time Media
- Known for: Taurus Mask in The Mask Singer (Zodiac season)
- Notable work: The Mask Singer Thailand (Panelist), I Can See Your Voice Thailand (Detective)

Thanawat Prasitsomporn (Thai: ธนวัฒน์ ประสิทธิสมพร), better known as DJ Nui, was born on Sunday, June 26, 1983, in Mueang District, Kanchanaburi Province. He completed his secondary education at Visuttharangsi School in Kanchanaburi before graduating from the Faculty of Communication Arts, majoring in Radio and Television, at the University of the Thai Chamber of Commerce.

He began his career as a radio DJ for 94 EFM, starting as a news reader for the program Chae Tae Chao alongside DJs Moddam and Krit on Thursdays, Fridays, and Saturdays. This role earned him the nickname "Nui Chae Tae Chao" after the program's title. In addition to radio, he is a prolific voice actor and has appeared in numerous films and television dramas. He is also widely recognized as a permanent panelist on The Mask Singer Thailand and a "detective" on I Can See Your Voice Thailand.
