= Sarunyu Winaipanit =

Thai singer and actor (born 1984

Sarunyu Winaipanit ศรัณยู วินัยพานิช
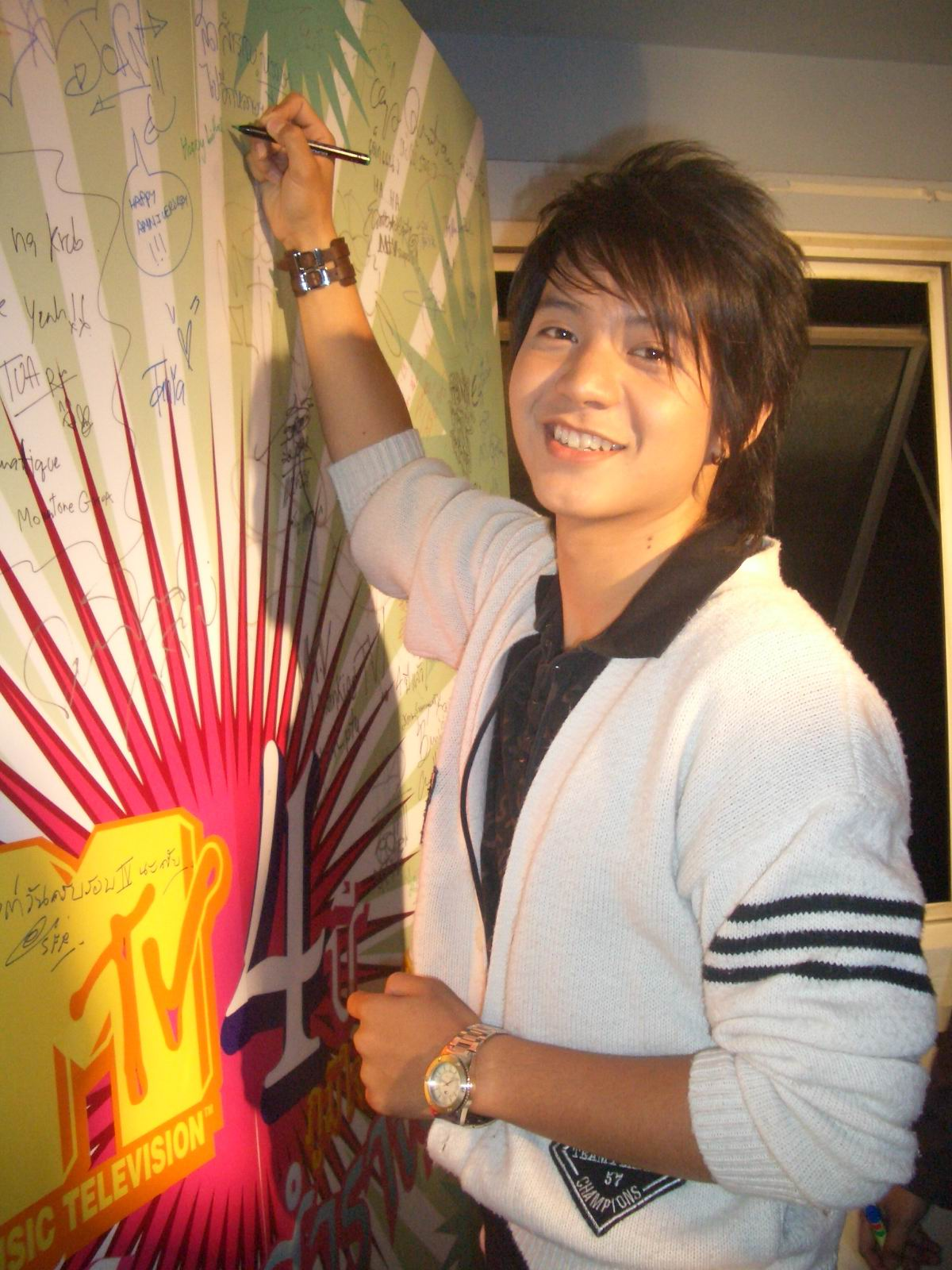
- Sarunyu at the MTV Awards Ceremony in December 2007

Background information
- Also known as: Ice Saranyu
- Born: September 12, 1984 (age 42); Chainat, Thailand
- Genres: Thai pop; R&B
- Occupations: Singer; actor; MC; YouTuber
- Label: GMM Grammy
- Website: Official website

Sarunyu Winaipanit (Thai: ศรัณยู วินัยพานิช; RTGS: Saranyu Winaiphanit; September 12, 1984, Chainat, Thailand), nicknamed Ice (Thai: ไอซ์) is a Thai singer and actor. His love for entertaining has brought him the nickname ‘The Prince of Smiles’.

== Biography ==
Sarunyu Winaipanit was born on September 12, 1984. His parents are Thai teachers. He graduated from Srinakharinwirot University, Faculty of fine arts with a Bachelor's in Acting and Directing.

In 2003, he won a competition at GMM's, the first stage project show and that is how he got into the music business. In 2006, Ice released his debut album, ICE Sarunyu along with the single "Kon Jai Ngai" under the label Thai GMM Grammy. He later released a Japanese version of the song entitled "Koi Nanja Nai". One year later, he released his second album, Party on Ice, followed by ICE Kool Hits in 2008, which is a compilation album of songs from his two previous albums and work he had done on other albums.

Winaipanit also worked alongside fellow Thai pop singers Palitchoke Ayanaputra (Peck) and Pongsak Rattanapong (Aof), under the name PECK AOF ICE, and released an album, entitled Together, along with singles "Kae Kon Toh Pid" and "Narak Na LOVE".

His album รักกันนะ (Rak Kan Na) was released in 2012. He has starred in some Thai lakorns.

== Discography ==
=== Studio albums ===
- 2006 – ICE Sarunyu
- 2007 – Party on ICE
- 2008 – ICE WITH U
- 2010 – ICE Festa
- 2012 – Rak Kan Na (รักกันนะ)

== Awards ==
Partial listing of awards won

- 2019 – Golden TV Awards for best TV soundtrack: Love Destiny
- 2019 – 10th Nataraj Awards for best TV soundtrack: Love Destiny
