= Workpoint TV =

Thai television network

- Type: Television network
- Country: Thailand
- Broadcast area: Southeast Asia

Ownership
- Owner: Workpoint Entertainment
- Key people: Phanya Nirunkul (2014-Present) Prapas Cholsaranont (2014-Present)

History
- Launched: As a Free-To-Air satellite channel: 26 September 2011; 14 years ago As a Free-To-Air DTT Channel: 1 April 2014; 12 years ago DTT and Satellite Channel Number matched: 2 December 2015; 10 years ago

Links
- Website: https://www.workpointtv.com/

Workpoint Channel (Thai: ช่องเวิร์คพอยท์) is a national digital terrestrial television network in Thailand, operated by Thai Broadcasting Co., Ltd., a subsidiary of Workpoint Entertainment Public Company Limited. The channel provides general programming in standard definition, with a primary focus on game shows and variety shows. Many of its programs were previously produced and aired on other free-to-air television channels before being moved to this channel.

== History ==
Workpoint Entertainment began to test their satellite TV broadcasting Channel for Workpoints TV On September 26 of 2011. Then on October 3 in the same year, the formal program plan was announced and originally began at the end of the test broadcasting period. After that, they officially began to broadcasting on January 1 of 2012, but due to the building's operation Workpoint Public Company Limited in Pathum Thani Province face a great flood so the schedule as mentioned above was postponed to February 20 in the same year. Later on December 26 of 2013, Workpoint Plc. assigned to Thai Broadcasting Co. Ltd, which is a subsidiary participate in the auction of channels with broadcasting trade commission TV commercial business and then sort of a list in general both high-definition and standard-definition image are available.

As a result, Thai Broadcasting Co.Ltd. won the auction for the typical clear picture type No. 23 and will begin testing terrestrial broadcasting on April 1 of 2014 along with most business operators.

== Channel number adjustment ==
The satellite and cable TV networks were processed by the Broadcasting Business Committee, or TV business, which included the National Telecommunications Business, or NBTC. by entering the first ten numbers and then digital television channels, which is a dish box for receiving PSI satellite signals. On April 1 of 2014 - November 15 of 2015, Workpoint channel is number 1, other satellite box models are number 33, and digital system is number 23. Workpoint channel number 33, which was Workpoint channel number 1 of the dish box intended for receiving PSI satellite signals, was removed from the satellite system, including cable. High definition and regular clear visuals are used in most programs. As a result, Thai Broadcasting Co., Ltd. sold basic clear images through auctions. Receiving PSI satellite signals with the dish box. has high-definition workstation channels. After that, the NBTC advised that the sharpness be adjusted. The Broadcasting Business Committee, TV business, and the National Telecommunications Commission, or NBTC, abolished 10 numbered channels from December 1, 2015 to the present. The first satellite dish. and number the channels in every system and platform with a single number so that viewers don't get confused about which workpoint television is number 23.

== News ==
Workpoint TV started to have news programs via satellite in 2012 by hiring Matichon to produce the program. It started broadcasting on August 6, 2012. Later, news stories were added at various times and hourly news was added at the end of 2015. Workpoint TV wanted to build their own news team. Therefore, the time of the news program which belonged to the original Matichon TV, was restored to produce all by themselves. By setting up a news team "Workpoint News" to produce news programs from 2016. to the present. Later on November 18, 2019, a new program was launched. "Workpoint Today", an online news program of the "Workpoint News" team. Before the format of Workpoint News was transformed into a full-fledged online news agency under the name "Workpoint Today" in 2020 and separate the presentation area from the television news team originally renamed it. Workpoint 23 News, but still working together by Workpoint 23 News team, with the slogan "Truth comes first", which was introduced on March 3, 2020.

=== Presenters ===
==== Current notable news anchors and reporters ====
- Banjong Cheewamongkolkan
- Kittikorn Silpadontri
- Kankan Sutthikoses
- Thanaphat Tirangkul
- Pakpoom Jongmanwattana
- Somphop Rattanawalee
- Suphapchai Butchan
- Kalwela Saoruean
- Prapasri Saphanon
- Rinrada Raweelert
- Sudarat Butprom
- Umaporn Thamrongwongsophon

==== Former News Anchors and Reporters ====
- Elizabeth Saddler Leenanuchai (currently at TNN16)
- Yanin Yanachpaween (currently at ONE31 and GMM25 under One News)
- Benjapon Cheyarun (currently a freelance host)
- Piyapat Jiraprasertkul (currently inactive)
- Thanakrit Chucherd (currently inactive)
- Natthaphon Luangkanoknawanich (currently inactive)
- Ananya Tosangchai (currently inactive)
- Nisararat Wilailak (currently inactive)
- Waranont Pajayiko (currently inactive)
- Piyada Jirapojchaphon (currently inactive)
- Morakot Saengthaveep (currently a freelance host)
- Sujira Arunpipat (currently a freelance host)
- Akamsiri Suwansuk (currently inactive)
- Woraphan Jacobsen (currently inactive)
- Pongpisut Piwaon (currently media personnel and freelance host)
- Lalida Thonglor (currently inactive)
- Rueschanok Meesang (currently inactive)
- Chaiya Mitchai (currently a freelance host)
- Sin Rujirawanich (currently inactive)
- Danu Chutinavi (currently inactive)
- Natthapon Leeyavanich (currently inactive)
- Atichan Cherngchawano (currently inactive)
- Chonthicha Asawanich (currently at TNN16)
- Kiattijaroen (currently a freelance host)
- Siwat Chotichairin (currently a freelance host)
- Carbon Yuthana (currently inactive)
- Pharanyu Rojanawuthitham (currently inactive)
- Sukonthawa Kerdnimit (currently inactive)
- Thansita Suwacharathanakit (currently a freelance host)
- Mongkol Saadboonphat (currently a freelance host)
- Adinan Mueanyang (currently at Matichon)
- Thanarat Koomsubat (currently inactive)
- Suwakorn Phleukmonthon (currently at Thai PBS)
- Wasana Sripong (currently inactive)
- Panisara Khomawut (currently inactive)
- Panduangnet Klomjai (currently inactive)
- Panrawat Limrattanaporn (currently a freelance host)
- Somsak Srichum (currently inactive)
- Trai Numkaew (currently inactive)
- Chompoonuch Tandasethi (currently at NBT and freelance host)
- Donyakit Daengwanpisit (currently at PPTV)
- Yingsak Jonglertjesdawong (currently at Channel 7)

== Awards ==
- Outstanding Disaster Media Award 2020, presented by the Disaster Communication Development Center on 5 November 2020.
- Social Contribution Agency Award 2020, presented by the Ministry of Social Development and Human Security and the Association for the Mentally Disabled of Thailand on 20 August 2020.
- Golden Television Awards (31st edition, 2016): Outstanding Variety Promotion Television Station, held on 18 February 2017 by the Television Promotion Club.
- Mekhala Awards 2016: Best Digital Television Station, awarded on 30 March 2016.
- Outstanding Digital TV Station Award at the "Maya Awards – Maya Mahachon 2015", organized by Maya Channel magazine on 9 September 2015.
- Creative Entertainment Award at the Me Awards 2015, hosted by Me magazine on 24 July 2015.
- Global Vesak Buddhist Ambassador Honor Award 2015, in the category of Television Station Promoting Buddhism, presented on 28 May 2015.
- Royal Institute of Thailand Commendation Award (2015): Television Station Supporting Royal Institute Award-winning Hosts, presented on 26 February 2015.
- Phikhanesuan Awards – National Broadcasting and Television Awards (3rd edition, 2014): Best Digital TV Station, presented on 31 July 2014.
- Thailand Zocial Awards 2022: Best Brand Performance on Social Media in the Broadcasting category.
- Maya Awards 2022: Best Creative Variety Television Station of the Year.
