= Masked Singer =

Reality TV singing competition format

- Created by: Wonwoo Park
- Original work: King of Mask Singer
- Owner: MBC Entertainment
- Years: 2015–present

Films and television
- Television series: Masked Singer (independent international versions, see below)

Miscellaneous
- Genre: Music; Reality game show
- First aired: 18 February 2015

Masked Singer is an international music reality game show franchise. It originated from the South Korean program The King of Mask Singer, developed by Munhwa Broadcasting Corporation.

== Format ==
The format features celebrities who perform a song anonymously in elaborate masks or head-to-toe costumes. The panelists will then guess the identity based on clues the singers give about themselves. After their performances, the singers are voted by the audiences in each round while the panelists do not participate in the vote. The singer who receives the fewest votes in each round is unmasked and eliminated until the winner is declared.

The participating celebrities can come from various different occupational backgrounds. The original South Korean series features various musicians, actors or actresses, and comedians. The singers of the American series have spanned further up to the range of Grammy Award winners, professional video gamers, YouTube influencers and professional athletes.

The voting system may also be different based on the program's country. In Armenia, Austria, the Netherlands, the United States and the UK, the votes are limited to the live studio audience members due to the show being pre-recorded. In Germany and Italy, votes are open to all viewers because the show is live. The Swedish format provides simulated live voting without the ability to actually affect the pre-recorded show, which was criticised as deceptive when it was noted after the show's second week.

The original South Korean series King of Mask Singer is a continuous, episode-by-episode format, in which the winner is decided after each tournament that lasts two weekly episodes. In the final round of each tournament, the finalist singer must face-off the previous bi-weekly winner to take over the champion title. The program thus focuses on how long the one can defend the champion title. In comparison, most of the other international versions have been following the seasonal format in which the winner is declared after a single season tournament that lasts from few months to about a year. The international programs consequently focus on who the champion is after the months to year-long tournament.

The first unofficial winner of the franchise was Solji of the South Korean girl group EXID, who won in the pilot episode of the original South Korean version, King of Mask Singer, that aired on 18 February 2015. The first official winner of the franchise was Luna of the K-Pop girl group f(x), who was declared as the winner of the first ever tournament held in the original South Korean series on 12 April 2015.

From the Chinese series, which was the first adaptation of the South Korean show to be launched outside South Korea with a seasonal format, the Chinese singer Sun Nan became the first winner outside the original South Korean series on 27 September 2015 after the two months long first season.

The Thai series was the first version of the franchise with annual seasons. The Thai singer Issara Kitnitchi, under the name "Durian", became the first winner to win an annual season format from the second ever franchise to be launched outside South Korea on 23 March 2017. The most recent winner is Vincent Gross, who won the 13th German season as "Fernando El Toro".

== International versions ==
Franchise with a currently airing series or season
Franchise with an upcoming season
Franchise with an unknown status
Franchise awaiting confirmation
Franchise that has ended

Country/region	Local title	Network	Seasons and winners	Panelists	Host(s)
Arab world	The Masked Singer - Inta meen? (The Masked Singer - Who are you?)	MBC 1	Season 1, 2020: Ehab Tawfik as "Cobra"	Cyrine Abdelnour; Hassan El Raddad; Kosai Khauli; Mohanad Al Hamdi	Annabella Hilal
Argentina	¿Quién es la máscara? (Who is the Mask?)	Telefe	Season 1, 2022: Fernando Dente as "Unicorn"	Karina la Princesita; Lizy Tagliani; Roberto Moldavsky; Wanda Nara	Natalia Oreiro
Armenia	Դիմակահանդես (Masquerade)	AMPTV	Season 1, 2021: Erik Karapetyan as "Alien"; Season 2, 2022: Nerses Avetisyan as "Joker"; Season 3, 2024: Sona Rubenyan as "Penguin" and Armen Petrosyan as "Madame Hippo"	Current; Garik Papoyan; Iveta Mukuchyan; Erik Karapetyan (3-); Former; SONA (1-2); Khoren Levonyan (1); Rafayel Yeranosyan (2)	Current; Aram MP3 (2-); Former; Feliks Khachatryan (1)
Australia	The Masked Singer	Network Ten	Season 1, 2019: Cody Simpson as "Robot"; Season 2, 2020: Bonnie Anderson as "Bushranger"; Season 3, 2021: Anastacia as "Vampire"; Season 4, 2022: Melody Thornton as "Mirrorball"; Season 5, 2023: Dami Im as "Snow Fox"	Dannii Minogue (1–3); Jackie O (1–3); Lindsay Lohan (1); Urzila Carlson (2–3); Dave Hughes (1–5); Mel B (4–5); Abbie Chatfield (4–5); Chrissie Swan (4–5)	Osher Günsberg
Austria	The Masked Singer Austria	Puls 4	Season 1, 2020: Nadine Beiler as "Yeti"; Season 2, 2021: Sandra Pires as "Baby Elephant"	Nathan Trent (1); Elke Winkens (1-2); Sasa Schwarzjirg (1-2); Rainer Schönfelder (2)	Arabella Kiesbauer (1); Mirjam Weichselbraun (2)
Azerbaijan	Maska (Mask)	İTV	Season 1, 2023-2024: Dilara Kazimova as "Wolf"; Season 2, 2026: Ilkin Dovlatov as "Qirat"	Faig Aghayev; Joshgun Rahimov; Kamila Babayeva; Murad Arif; Nigar Jamal	Aga Nadirov
Belgium (Flanders)	The Masked Singer	VTM	Season 1, 2020: Sandra Kim as "Queen"; Season 2, 2022: Camille Dhont as "Miss Kitty"; Season 3, 2023: Aaron Blommaert as "Wizard"; Season 4, 2024: Francisco Schuster as "Labradoodle"; Season 5, 2025-26: Jade Mintjens as "King Crab"	Current; Tinne Embrechts (3–); Aaron Blommaert (4–); Elisabeth Lucie Baeten (4-); Frances Lefebure (4–); Ruth Beeckmans (2, 4-); Veronique de Kock (4–); Céline van Ouystel (5–); Francisco Schuster (5–); James Cooke (5–); Ward Lemmerijn (5–); Former; Jens Dendoncker (1–2); Julie Van den Steen (1–3); Karen Damen (1–3); Andy Peelman (2–3); Kevin Janssens (2-3); Bart Cannaerts (3); Boris Van Severen (4); Erik Van Looy (4)	Current; Jens Dendoncker (3–); Former; Niels Destadsbader (1–2)
Brazil	The Masked Singer Brasil	TV Globo	Season 1, 2021: Priscilla Alcantara as "Unicorn"; Season 2, 2022: David Junior as "Dragon"; Season 3, 2023: Flay as "DJ Water-Lily"; Season 4, 2024: Silvero Pereira as "Goat"; Season 5, 2025: Diego Martins as "Odete Roitman"	Simone Mendes (1); Rodrigo Lombardi (1–2); Eduardo Sterblitch (1-3); Mateus Solano (3); Taís Araújo (1-4); José Loreto (4); Paulo Vieira (4); Tatá Werneck (2, 5); Sabrina Sato (3-5); Belo (5); Tony Ramos (5)	Ivete Sangalo (1–4); Eliana Michaelichen (5); Camilla de Lucas (1, Backstage); Priscilla Alcantara (2–3, Backstage); Kenya Sade (4-5, Backstage)
Bulgaria	Маскираният певец (The Masked Singer)	NOVA TV	Season 1, 2019: Mihaela Marinova as "Raven"; Season 2, 2020: Borislav Zakhariev as "Baba Yaga"; Season 3, 2021: Victoria Georgieva as "Miss"	Gala (1); Gero (1); Maria Ilieva (1); Niki Kanchev (1); Alexandra Raeva (2–3); Azis (2–3); Vladimir Penev (2–3); Martina Vachkova (3)	Dimitar Rachkov (1); Zueka (1-2); Gero (2–3); Krasimir Radkov (3)
Cambodia	The Mask Singer Cambodia	Hang Meas HDTV	Season 1, 2020: Sopheak Chameroun as "Great Flower"	Various	?
Canada (Quebec)	Chanteurs masqués	TVA	Season 1, 2021 : Wilfred Le Bouthillier & Marie-Élaine Thibert as "Lovebirds"; Season 2, 2022: Véronique Claveau as "Queen of the Day and the Night"; Season 3, 2023: Michel Courtemanche as "Chameleon"; Season 4, 2024: Gabrielle Destroismaisons as "Swan"; Season 5, 2025: Steph Carse as "Cardinal"; Season 6, 2026: Current season	Current; Anouk Meunier; Sam Breton; Stéphane Rousseau; Mélissa Bédard (4–); Former; Marc Dupré (1); Véronic DiCaire (1–3)	Current; Sébastien Benoit (4–); Former; Guillaume Lemay-Thivierge (1–3)
Chile	¿Quién es la máscara?	Chilevisión	Season 1, 2021: Daniela Castillo as "Doll"; Season 2, 2021: Fernanda Hansen as "Panda"; Season 3, 2021–22: Kanela as "Rabbit"	Millaray Vierra (1–2); Cristián Riquelme (1–3); Cristián Sánchez (1–3); Macarena Pizarro (1–3); María Elena Swett (1–3)	Julián Elfenbein
China (Mandarin)	King of Mask Singer	JSTV	Season 1, 2015: Sun Nan	Annie Yi; Dai Jun; Eric Moo; Li Chen; Li Xiang; Sun Hao	Li Hao
China (Mandarin)	Mask Singer	JSTV	Season 1, 2016: No winner	Various	Li Hao
China (Mandarin)	Masked Dancing King	JSTV	Season 1, 2020: Meng Meiqi	Aarif Rahman; Angela Chang; Fong June	Zhang Chunye
Colombia	¿Quién es la máscara?	RCN	Season 1, Part 1, 2021: Juanse Quintero as "Fox"; Season 1, Part 2, 2021–22: Karoll Márquez as "Crazy Coconut"; Season 1, 2021–22: Juanse Quintero as "Fox"	Alejandra Azcárate; Juanda Caribe; Lina Tejeiro; Llane	Piter Albeiro; Susy Mora (Backstage)
Croatia	Masked Singer	RTL	Season 1, 2022: Zsa Zsa as "Jellyfish"; Season 2, 2023: Damir Kedžo as "Donkey"	Antonija Mandić (1); Enis Bešlagić (1); Ida Prester (1); Borko Perić (1-2); Antonija Blaće (2); Nives Celzijus (2); Saša Lozar (2)	Antonija Blaće (1); Nikolina Pišek (2)
Czechia; Slovakia	Zlatá maska (Golden mask)	Prima; JOJ	Season 1, 2020: Lucia Siposová as "Monster"	Jakub Prachař; Jiřina Bohdalová; Libor Bouček; Michal Hudák	Martin Rausch
Denmark	Hvem holder masken? (Who keeps their mask on?, lit. "Who keeps/holds the mask?")	TV2	Season 1, 2021: Silas Holst as "Egg Food"; Season 2, 2022: Pelle Emil Hebsgaard as "Fox"	Frederik Cilius; Mille Dinesen; Peter Frödin; Sofie Jo Kaufmanas	Ibi Makienok
Estonia	Maskis laulja (Masked Singer)	TV3	Season 1, Spring 2020: Stefan Airapetjan as "Aries"; Season 2, 2020: Mikk Saar as "Arctic Wolf"; Season 3, 2022: Franz Malmsten as "Blue Monkey"; Season 4, 2024: Genka as "Elephant"; Season 5, 2025: Saara Pius as "Noise Bear"	Current; Kristjan Jõekalda (2, 4-); Eda-Ines Etti (4-); Maris Kõrvits (5-); Reigo Tamm (5-); Former; Ženja Fokin (1); Krista Lensin (1–2); Mart Juur (1–2); Birgitte Susanne Hunt (1–3); Karl-Erik Taukar (3); Peeter Oja (3); Liina Kanarbik (4); Mart Sander (4)	Current; Karl-Erik Taukar (5-); Former; Mart Sander (1–3); Franz Malmsten (4)
Finland	Masked Singer Suomi	MTV3	Season 1, Early 2020: Sami Hedberg as "Lion"; Season 2, 2020: Marko Hietala as "Doctor"; Season 3, 2021: Anna-Maija Tuokko as "Superhero"; Season 4, 2022: Lenni-Kalle Taipale as "Black Sheep"; Season 5, 2023: Bess as "Hummingbird"; Season 6, 2024: Atte Kilpinen as "Forest Troll"; Season 7, 2025: Sebastian Rejman as "Fartman"; Season 8, 2026: Current season	Current; Janne Kataja; Benjamin (5–); Krista Siegfrieds (8–); Guests (7-); Former; Jenni Kokander (1–4); Christoffer Strandberg (2–4); Maria Veitola (1–6); Jenni Poikelus (5–7)	Ilkka Uusivuori
France	Mask Singer	TF1	Season 1, 2019: Laurence Boccolini as "Unicorn"; Season 2, 2020: Larusso as "Penguin"; Season 3, 2022: Denitsa Ikonomova as "Butterfly"; Season 4, 2022: Amaury Vassili as "Turtle"; Season 5, 2023: Vincent Niclo as "Husky"; Season 6, 2024: Agustín Galiana as "Hippo"; Season 7, 2025: Lola Dubini as "Giraffe"; Season 8, 2025: Ycare as "Rabbit"; Season 9, 2026: Billy Crawford as "Donkey"; Season 10, 2026: Upcoming season	Current; Michaël Youn (8–); Élodie Poux (7, 10); Arnaud Ducret (10); Constance Gay (10); Former; Alessandra Sublet (1–3); Anggun (1–3); Jarry (1–3); Vitaa (4); Jeff Panacloc (4–5); Élodie Frégé (5); Michèle Bernier (5); Inès Reg (6); Kev Adams (1-9); Chantal Ladesou (4, 6–9); Laurent Ruquier (6–9)	Camille Combal
Georgia	ვინ ვინ არის (Who is who)	Imedi Media Holding	Season 1, 2022: Aleko Begalishvili as "Hippopotamus"; Season 2, 2023: Manika Asatiani as "Faskunji"; Season 3, 2024: Irakli Kavsadze as "Cello"; Season 4, 2025: Gia Bagashvili as "Kangaroo"; Season 5, 2025-26: Nato Metonidze as "Queen"	Current; Anri Jokhadze; Manika Asatiani (3-); Otar Tatishvili (3-); Liza Bagrationi (1-2, 5); Former; David Doiashvili (1-2); Naniko Khazaradze (1-3); Nikoloz Tsulukidze (3); Basa Potskhishvili (4)	Current; Maka Zambakhidze (4-); Former; Bakhva Bregvadze (1-2); Ruska Makashvili (3)
Germany	The Masked Singer	ProSieben	Season 1, 2019: Max Mutzke as "Astronaut"; Season 2, Early 2020: Tom Beck as "Sloth"; Season 3, Late 2020: Sarah Lombardi as "Skeleton"; Season 4, Early 2021: Sasha as "Dinosaur"; Season 5, Late 2021: Alexander Klaws as "Mülli Müller"; Season 6, Early 2022: Ella Endlich as "Zebra"; Season 7, Late 2022: Daniel Donskoy as "Mole"; Season 8, Early 2023: Luca Hänni as "Shoebill"; Season 9, Late 2023: Jennifer Weist as "Ice Princess"; Season 10, Early 2024: Mirja Boes as "Flea"; Season 11, Late 2024: Loi as "Panda"; Season 12, 2025: Meltem Kaptan as "Moonika"; Season 13, 2026: Vincent Gross as "Fernando El Toro"	Current; Chris Tall (12–); Verona Pooth (12–); Former; Collien Ulmen-Fernandes (1); Max Giesinger (1); Bülent Ceylan (3); Sonja Zietlow (3); Ruth Moschner (1–2, 4–9); Álvaro Soler (9); Rick Kavanian (9-10); Palina Rojinski (10–11); Rea Garvey (2, 4–6, 8, 11)	Current; Matthias Opdenhövel; Former; Thore Schölermann (6)
Germany	The Masked Dancer	ProSieben	Season 1, 2022: Oli.P as "Monkey"	Alexander Klaws; Steven Gätjen	Matthias Opdenhövel
Greece	The Masked Singer	Skai TV	Season 1, 2022: Renos Haralambidis as "Minotaur"	Athina Oikonomakou; Elisavet Konstantinidou; Nikos Moutsinas; Thodoris Marantinis	Sakis Rouvas
Hungary	Álarcos énekes (Masked Singer)	RTL	Season 1, Early 2020: Niki Gallusz as "Bunny"; Season 2, 2020: Dávid Miller as "Banana"; Season 3, 2021: Tamás Vastag as "Chameleon"; Season 4, 2024: Bence Brasch as "Polar Bear"; Season 5, 2026: Current season	Current; Balázs Sebestyén (1–2, 4–); Eszter Ráskó (4–); Joci Pápai (5–); Péter Puskás (5–); Former; Péter Dancsó (1); Laci Gáspár (1–2); Bea Hargitai (2); Ervin Nagy (3); Szandi (3); Tomi Fluor (3); Zsófi Szabó (3); Adél Csobot (1–2, 4); Bence Istenes (4)	Current; Bence Istenes (1–3, 5–); Former; Péter Puskás (4)
Indonesia	The Mask Singer Indonesia	GTV	Season 1, 2017–18: Prastiwi Dwiarti; Season 2, 2018: Chiquita Meidy; Season 3, 2018: Tia Andriani; Season 4, 2019: Glen Samuel	Budi Doremi (2); Inul Daritsita (2); Arie Untung (1-3); Tora Sudiro (3); Denny Chandra (1-4); Kartika Putri (1-4); Melly Goeslaw (1-4); Prastiwi Dwiarti (2-4); Bedu (1, 4); Dewi Gita (4); Cak Lontong (4); Yadi Sembako (4); Chrismanto Eka Prasito (4)	John Martin Tumbel (1-4)
Israel	הזמר במסכה (The Singer in the Mask)	Channel 12	Season 1, 2020: Tzachi Halevy as "Rooster"; Season 2, 2021: Shay Gabso as "Gorilla"; Season 3, 2022–23: Yael Elkana as "Spider"; Season 4, 2025: Dana Ivgy as "Sufganiyah"; Season 5, 2026: Current season	Ofira Asayag; Shahar Hason; Tzedi Tzarfati; Bar Refaeli (5-); Moshe Peretz (5-); Former; Ben El Tavori (1-3); Static (1-4)	Ido Rosenblum
Italy	Il cantante mascherato (The Masked Singer)	Rai 1	Season 1, 2020: Teo Mammucari as "Rabbit"; Season 2, 2021: Red Canzian as "Parrot"; Season 3, 2022: Paolo Conticini as "Fox"; Season 4, 2023: Samuel Peron as "Venetian Knight"	Guillermo Mariotto (1); Ilenia Pastorelli (1); Patty Pravo (1–2); Costantino della Gherardesca (2); Caterina Balivo (2–3); Arisa (3); Flavio Insinna (1-4); Francesco Facchinetti (1-4); Christian De Sica (4); Iva Zanicchi (4); Serena Bortone (4)	Milly Carlucci
Japan	The Masked Singer Japan	Amazon Prime Video Japan	Season 1, 2021: Anna Tsuchiya as "Bird"; Season 2, 2022: Maki Goto as "Venus"	Kiko Mizuhara (1); A-chan (1–2); Kashiyuka (1–2); Miyavi (1–2); Nocchi (1–2)	Yo Oizumi; Kazuya Kojima (2)
Kazakhstan	Маска (Mask)	Current; TV7 (3-); Former; Khabar (1-2)	Season 1, 2021: Erden Zhaksybekov as "Argali"; Season 2, 2022: Serik Ibragimov as "Rooster"; Season 3, 2024–25: Kyle Ruh as "Raven"	Current; ACE (3-); Gulnara Silbaeva (3-); Karakoz Tleubekova (3-); Sharip Serik (3-); Former; Meirzhan Turebaev (1); Erke Esmahan (1-2); Marat Oralgazin (1-2); Zhanar Aizhanova (1-2); Kairat Dombayev (2)	Current; Ardak Kassymkhan (3-); Former; Zhakhan Utargaliev (1-2)
Latvia	Balss Maskā (Masked Voice)	TV3	Season 1, 2020: Kristaps Strūbergs as "Demon"; Season 2, 2021: Gints Andžāns as "White Wolf"; Season 3, 2023: Kristīne Garklāva as "Lucky Bear"; Season 4, 2024: Nansija Garkalne as "Fox"	Jānis Šipkēvics Sr. (1-3); Baiba Sipeniece-Gavare (1-4); Krivenchy (1-4); Samanta Tina (1-4); Mārtiņš Spuris (4)	Mārtiņš Spuris (1-2); Gints Andžāns (3-4)
Lithuania	Kaukės (Masks)	LNK	Season 1, 2020: Rūta Ščiogolevaitė as "Unicorn"; Season 2, 2021: Martynas Kavaliauskas as "Ram"; Season 3, 2022: Stano as "Beetroot"; Season 4, 2023: Dainius Kazlauskas as "Raven"; Season 5, 2024: Arnas Ašmonas as "Zebra"	Aleksandras Pogrebnojus (1); Darjuš Lavrinovič (1–2); Indrė Kavaliauskaitė-Morkūnienė (1–2); Kšyštof Lavrinovič (1–2); Livija Gradauskienė (1–2); Vaidotas Valiukevičius (1–2); Paul de Miko (3); Rūta Ščiogolevaitė (3); Vidas Bareikis (3); Monika Liu (2–4); Robertas Kalinkinas (3–4); Simona Nainė (4); Stano (4); Toma Vaškevičiūtė (4); Dainius Kazlauskas (5); Laurynas Suodaitis (5); Liepa Mondeikaitė (5); Remis Retro (5); Ugnė Siparė (5)	Giedrius Savickas
Malaysia	The Masked Singer Malaysia	Astro Warna	Season 1, 2020: Aina Abdul as "Hibiscus"; Season 2, 2022: Shila Amzah as "Rambutan"; Season 3, 2022–2023: Ayda Jebat as "Betta Fish"; Season 4, 2023–24: Stacy as "Sunflower"	Raja Azura (1–2); Ramona Zamzam (1–2); Remy Ishak (1–2); Amy Mastura (2); Ella (1–3); Atu Zero (3); Didie Alias (3); Emma Maembong (3); Misha Omar (3); Sharnaaz Ahmad (3); Shuib Sepahtu (3); Zul Ariffin (3); Angah Iskandarsah (1–2, 4); Datuk Aznil Hj Nawawi (1–2, 4); Michael Ang (1–2, 4); Zizan Razak (1–2, 4); Nabila Huda (1, 4); Elly Mazlein (3-4); Erra Fazira (4); Rozita Che Wan (4); Sherry Alhadad (4)	Dato' AC Mizal
Malta	The Masked Singer Malta	TVM	Season 1, 2025: Gianni Zammit as "Garbage Monster"	Amber Bondin; Josmar Gatt; Ryan Borg; Valentina Rossi	Alan Montanaro
Mexico	¿Quién es la máscara? (Who is the Mask?)	Las Estrellas	Season 1, 2019: Vadhir Derbez as "Chameleon"; Season 2, 2020: María León as "Disco Ball"; Season 3, 2021: Kalimba as "Apache"; Season 4, 2022: JNS as "Vegetable Crate"; Season 5, 2023: Bárbara de Regil as "Porcupunk"; Season 6, 2024: Armando Hernández as "Freddie Verdury"; Season 7, 2025: Paulina Goto as "Tropi Coco"; Season 8, 2026: Current season	Current; Juanpa Zurita (2–); Anahí (6–); Yuri (1–5, 8-); Mauricio Ochmann (8-); Former; Adrián Uribe (1); Consuelo Duval (1–2); Mónica Huarte (3); Galilea Montijo (4); Martha Higareda (5–6); Carlos Rivera (1-7); Ana Brenda Contreras (7)	Current; Omar Chaparro (1–2, 4); Marisol González (4–) ("Backstage"); Former; Natália Téllez (1–2) ("Backstage"); Adrían Uribe (3); Alan Estrada (3) ("Backstage")
Mongolia	The Masked Singer Mongolia	Central Television	Season 1, 2022/23: Khayanaa as "Owl"	Ankhmaa; Odgerel; Rokit Bay; Sodoo	Ankhbayar
Myanmar	The Mask Singer Myanmar	MRTV Entertainment	Season 1, 2019–20: Sin Pauk as "Peacock"; Season 2, 2024: Rebecca Win as "Butterfly"; Season 3, 2026: Phyo Kyaw Htike as "Cassette Rockstar"	Current; Htun Htun; Sandy Myint Lwin (2-); Khine Thin Kyi (1, 3-); Phyo Ngwe Soe (3-); Former; A Yine (1); Yadanar My (1); Khin Zarchi Kyaw (2); Nhat Pyaw Kyaw (2)	Paing Zay Ye Tun
Netherlands	The Masked Singer	RTL 4	Season 1, 2019: Tania Kross as "Robot"; Season 2, 2020: Jan Dulles as "Neptune"; Season 3, 2021: Jamai Loman as "Cupid"; Season 4, 2022: Jeroen van der Boom as "Tiger"; Season 5, 2023: Simone Kleinsma as "Owl"; Season 6, 2024: Soy Kroon as "Pegasus"; Season 7, 2025-26: April Darby as "Glamourpoes"	Current; Buddy Vedder; Carlo Boszhard; Gerard Joling; Monica Geuze (5-); Former; Loretta Schrijver (1-6) ^{†}	Ruben Nicolai
New Zealand	The Masked Singer NZ	Three	Season 1, 2021: Jason Kerrison as "Tuatara"; Season 2, 2022: Hollie Smith as "Bedazzled Unicorn"	Ladi6 (1); Rhys Darby (1); James Roque (1-2); Sharyn Casey (1-2); Anika Moa (2)	Clinton Randell
Norway	Maskorama	NRK1	Season 1, 2020: Ulrikke Brandstorp as "Troll"; Season 2, 2021: Didrik Solli-Tangen as "Snow Monster"; Season 3, 2022: Bilal Saab as "Zombie"; Season 4, 2023: Kevin Vågenes as "Cat"; Season 5, 2024: Kim Wigaard Johansen as "Stone"; Season 6, 2025: PelleK as "Broccoli"; Season 7, 2026: Current season	Current; Tete Lidbom (4-); Tone Damli (6-); Leo Ajkic (7-); Former; Jan Thomas (1–3); Nicolay Ramm (1–3); Marion Raven (1–5); Robert Stoltenberg (4-6)	Silje Nordnes
Panama	¿Quién es la Máscara?	TVN	Season 1, 2022: José Miguel Castro as "Disco Ball"; Season 2, 2023: Joseline Pinto as "Cat"; Season 3, 2024: Yohany Guevara as "Res María"	K4G (1–2); Carolina Dementiev (1–3); Orman Innis (1–3); Sra Dezdy (1–3)	Pablo Brustein
Peru	La Máscara (The Mask)	Latina Televisión	Season 1: 2020: Eva Ayllón as "Monster"	Armando Machuca; Carlos Vílchez; Érika Villalobos; Gianella Neyra	Mathías Brivio
Philippines	Masked Singer Pilipinas	TV5	Season 1, 2020: Daryl Ong as "Dragonfly"; Season 2, 2022: Kris Lawrence as "Panda"; Season 3, 2025: Pepe Herrera as "Foxtastic Samurai"	Current; Arthur Nery (3-); Janno Gibbs (3-); Nadine Lustre (3-); Pops Fernandez (3-); Former; Aga Muhlach (1-2); Cristine Reyes (1-2); Kim Molina (1-2); Matteo Guidicelli (1-2); Bayani Agbayani (2)	Billy Crawford
Poland	Mask Singer	TVN	Season 1, 2022: Natasza Urbańska as "Rain"	Joanna Trzepiecińska; Julia Kamińska; Kacper Ruciński; Kuba Wojewódzki	Michał Meyer
Portugal	A Máscara (The Mask)	SIC	Season 1, 2020: Rita Guerra as "Crow"; Season 2, 2021: Pedro Granger as "Wolf"; Season 3, 2021-22: Ivo Lucas as "Viking"; Season 4, 2024: Fátima Lopes as "Beaver"; Season 5, 2025: Micaela as "Cob"	Current; Carolina Loureiro; César Mourão; Jorge Corrula; Aurea (4–); Former; Sónia Tavares (1–3)	João Manzarra
Romania	Masked Singer România (The Masked Singer Romania)	Pro TV	Season 1, 2020: Mugur Mihăescu as "Raven"; Season 2, 2021: Andreea Marin as "Mother of the Forest"	Ana Morodan (1); Codin Maticiuc (1); Horia Brenciu (1-2); Inna (1-2); Alex Bogdan (2); Mihaela Rădulescu (2)	Jorge (1); Pavel Bartoș (2)
Russia	Маска (Mask)	NTV	Season 1, 2020: Anatoly Tsoy as "Lion"; Season 2, 2021: Jony as "Crocodile"; Season 3, 2022: Ildar Abdrazakov as "Dragon"; Season 4, 2023: Dima Bilan as "Mammoth Cub" and Sergey Lazarev as "Scorpion"; Season 5, 2024: Seville as "Raccoon"; Season 6, 2025: Aleksandr Panayotov as "chief"; Season 7, 2026: Polina Gagarina as "Giraffe"	Current; Philipp Kirkorov; Regina Todorenko; Timur Rodriguez; Valeriya; Sergey Lazarev (7); Seville (6 ep 5, 7 ep 2-3); Aleksandr Panayotov (7 ep 9); Former; Garik Martirosyan (1); Aleksandr Revva (2); Timur Batrutdinov (3); Alexey Vorobyov (4); Guests (5); Stas Kostyushkin (6); Denis Klyaver (6 ep 3); Marina Kravets (6 ep 5)	Vyacheslav Makarov
Russia	Маска. Танцы (The Masked Dancer)	STS	Season 1, 2022: Katya Adushkina as "Zebra"	Egor Druzhinin; Maria Gorban; Sergey Svetlakov; Klava Koka; Timur Rodriguez	Yuri Muzychenko
South Africa	The Masked Singer South Africa	SABC	Season 1, 2023: Holly Rey as "Lollipop"; Season 2, 2024: Warren Masemola as "Giraffe"; Season 3, 2026: Bontle Modiselle as "Spotty"	J'Something; Sithelo Shozi; Skhumba Hlophe; Somizi Mhlongo	Mpho Popps
South Korea	King of Mask Singer	MBC	List of the winners (Continuous without season)	Regulars; Ahn Il-kwon; Kim Gu-ra; Kim Hyun-cheol; Lee Min; Lee Yoon-seok; Sandara Park; Shin Bong-sun; Yoo Young-seok; Yoon Sang; Guests; List of guest panelists	Kim Sung-joo
Spain	Mask Singer: Adivina quién canta (Mask Singer: Guess Who Sings)	Antena 3	Season 1, 2020: Paz Vega as "Catrina"; Season 2, 2021: Joaquín Cortés as "Hedgehog"; Season 3, 2023: Ana Torroja as "Little Mouse" and Fernando Morientes as "Gorilla"; Season 4, 2024: Abraham Mateo as "Fly"; Season 5, 2026: Leire Martínez as "Carnation"	Current; Ana Milán (4–); Boris Izaguirre (5–); Juan y Medio (5–); Ruth Lorenzo (5–); Former; Malú (1); José Mota (1–2); Paz Vega (2); Mónica Naranjo (3); Ana Obregón (3); Javier Ambrossi (1–4); Javier Calvo (1–4); Alaska (4)	Arturo Valls
Sweden	Masked Singer Sverige	TV4	Season 1, 2021: Daniel Norberg as "Gumball Machine"; Season 2, 2022: Marcus & Martinus as "Fiddler"; Season 3, 2023: Klara Hammarström as "Caramel"; Season 4, 2024: Fröken Snusk as "Chameleon"; Season 5, 2025: Lisa Ajax as "Porcelain Doll"; Season 6, 2026: John Lundvik as "Punk Parrot"	Current; Pernilla Wahlgren; Behrouz Badreh (5-); Carina Berg (5-); Edvin Törnblom (6-); Former; Felix Herngren (1-4); Nour El Refai (1-4); Måns Zelmerlöw (1-5)	David Hellenius
Switzerland	The Masked Singer Switzerland	ProSieben Schweiz	Season 1, 2020: Baschi as "Marmot"; Season 2, 2021: Ritschi as "Mammoth"; Season 3, 2022: Joey Heindle as "Toucan"; Season 4, 2023: Remo Forrer as "Orca"	Current; Luca Hänni; Christa Rigozzi (2–); Former; Steffi Buchli (1)	Current; Anna Maier (2–); Former; Alexandra Maurer (1)
Thailand	The Mask Singer	Workpoint TV	Season 1, 2016–17: Issara Kitnitchi as "Durian"; Season 2, 2017: Sarunrat Visutthithada as "Sumo"; Season 3, 2017–18: Anuwat Sanguansakpakdee as "Green Tea Worm"; Season 4, 2018: Tanont Chumroen as "Little Duck"; Season 5, 2018: Piyanut Sueachongpru as "Sun"; Season 6, 2018–19: Prangthip Thalaeng as "Tuk-Tuk"; Season 7, 2019: Sivakorn Adulsuttikul and Jackrin Kungwankiatichai as "Holvichai & Kavee"; Season 8, 2019: Muanpair Panaboot as "Sagittarius"; Season 9, 2019: No Winner; Season 10, 2020: Jaruwat Cheawaram as "Snake Wife"; Season 11, 2020: Ble Patumrach as "Bamboo Sticky Rice"; Season 12, 2023: No Winner; Season 13, 2024: Jeff Satur as "Rage" and Nitchapha Veersutthimas as "Delusion"	Regulars; Apissada Kueakhongkha; Krissanapoom Pibulsonggram; Maneenuch Samatsut; Siriporn Yuyod; Thanawat Prasitsomporn	Current; Siwat Chotchaicharin (13–); Former; Kan Kantathavorn (1–12)
Turkey	Maske Kimsin Sen? (Mask, who are you?)	Fox	Season 1, 2022: Özge Borak as "Lion"	Alican Yücesoy; Doğu Demirkol; Eda Ece; Melis Sezen	Tansel Öngel
Ukraine	Маска (Mask)	Ukraina	Season 1, Early 2021: Zlata Ognevich as "Sun"; Season 2, 2021: Mélovin as "Giraffe"	Anastasia Kamenskikh; Dzidzio; Oleh Vynnyk; Olya Polyakova; Verka Serduchka	Volodymyr Ostapchuk
United Kingdom	The Masked Singer	ITV	Series 1, 2020: Nicola Roberts as "Queen Bee"; Series 2, 2020–21: Joss Stone as "Sausage"; Series 3, 2022: Natalie Imbruglia as "Panda"; Series 4, 2023: Charlie Simpson as "Rhino"; Series 5, 2023–24: Danny Jones as "Piranha"; Series 6, 2025: Samantha Barks as "Pufferfish"; Series 7, 2026: Keisha Buchanan as "Moth"; Series 8, 2027: Upcoming series	Current; Davina McCall; Jonathan Ross; Mo Gilligan (2–); Maya Jama (6–); Alan Carr (8–); Former; Ken Jeong (1); Rita Ora (1–5)	Joel Dommett
United Kingdom	The Masked Dancer	ITV	Series 1, 2021: Louis Smith as "Carwash"; Series 2, 2022: Heather Morris as "Scissors"	Mo Gilligan (1); Davina McCall (1-2); Jonathan Ross (1-2); Oti Mabuse (1-2); Peter Crouch (2)	Joel Dommett
United States	The Masked Singer	Fox	Season 1, Winter 2019: T-Pain as "Monster"; Season 2, Fall 2019: Wayne Brady as "Fox"; Season 3, Spring 2020: Kandi Burruss as "Night Angel"; Season 4, Fall 2020: LeAnn Rimes as "Sun"; Season 5, Spring 2021: Nick Lachey as "Piglet"; Season 6, Fall 2021: Jewel as "Queen of Hearts"; Season 7, Spring 2022: Teyana Taylor as "Firefly"; Season 8, Fall 2022: Amber Riley as "Harp"; Season 9, Spring 2023: Bishop Briggs as "Medusa"; Season 10, Fall 2023: Ne-Yo as "Cow"; Season 11, Spring 2024: Vanessa Hudgens as "Goldfish"; Season 12, Fall 2024: Boyz II Men as "Buffalos"; Season 13, 2025: Gretchen Wilson as "Pearl"; Season 14, 2026: Ashlee Simpson as "Galaxy Girl"; Season 15, 2027: Upcoming season	Current; Jenny McCarthy Wahlberg; Ken Jeong; Robin Thicke; Rita Ora (11–); Former; Nicole Scherzinger (1–10)	Current; Nick Cannon; Former; Niecy Nash (5 ep 1-5)
United States	The Masked Dancer	Fox	Season 1, 2020–21: Gabby Douglas as "Cotton Candy"	Ashley Tisdale; Brian Austin Green; Ken Jeong; Paula Abdul	Craig Robinson
Uruguay	¿Quién es la Máscara? (Who is the Mask?)	Teledoce	Season 1, 2022: Manuela da Silveira as "Monster"; Season 2, 2023: Annasofía Facello as "Poodle"; Season 3, 2023: Luana as "Tigress"; Season 4, 2024: Claudia Fernández as "Toad"; Season 5, 2026: Vanesa Britos as "Fly"	Current; Fabián Delgado; Patricia Wolf; Sofía Rodríguez; Pablo Turturiello (4-); Former; Emir Abdul Gani (1–2); Fer Vázquez (3)	Maximiliano de la Cruz
Uzbekistan	Maska (Mask)	FTV	Season 1, 2025-26: Shaxriyor as "Tiger"	Current; Liil Khumarov; Ruhsona Emm; Mo'min (1-); Former; Alisher Uzoqov (1); Jenisbek Piyazov (1)	Aziz Gulyamov
Vietnam	Mặt nạ Ngôi Sao (The King of Mask Singer)	HTV7	Season 1, 2017: Mai Quốc Việt	Various	Hoàng Rapper
Vietnam	Ca sĩ mặt nạ (The Mask Singer Vietnam)	HTV2	Season 1, 2022: Ngọc Mai as "Ms. Lotus"; Season 2, 2023: Anh Tú as "Ban Don Elephant"; Season 3, 2026: Current season	Current; Trấn Thành; Bích Phương (2–); Former; Wowy (1); Đức Phúc (1); Tóc Tiên (1-2)	Ngô Kiến Huy

=== Spin-off: The Masked Dancer ===
On 7 January 2020, at the winter Television Critics Association press tour, Fox Alternative Entertainment and Warner Bros. Television announced that they had ordered a spin-off series, The Masked Dancer, with Ellen DeGeneres as executive producer. DeGeneres had previously conducted The Masked Dancer as a recurring segment of her syndicated talk show The Ellen DeGeneres Show, as a self-admitted parody of The Masked Singer. DeGeneres stated that the show was "gonna be just as fun and suspenseful", but "with a lot more krumping." On 28 October 2020, it was announced that Craig Robinson would host, the panelists would be Ken Jeong, Paula Abdul, Brian Austin Green, and Ashley Tisdale, and the show would premiere on 27 December 2020.

In 2020, a Chinese version of The Masked Dancer aired, Masked Dancing King (蒙面舞王). The winner was singer Meng Meiqi, competing as " The queen who does not wear a crown" (女王不戴冠).

In early February 2021, ITV acquired the rights to produce The Masked Dancer UK. On 4 March 2021, it was announced that ITV had commissioned the spin-off series. The series had 12 contestants competing through seven episodes, and was hosted by Dommett, with Ross, Gilligan, McCall, and Oti Mabuse serving as panellists. It aired in late spring 2021, filling in for Britain's Got Talent, which had its series 15 postponed until 2022 due to health and safety reasons concerning the COVID-19 pandemic in the United Kingdom.

In June 2021, EndemolShine Germany announced that the show would begin airing in Germany, so far it has been announced when and where the German version of The Masked Dancer would be shown.
