= King of Mask Singer (Chinese TV series) =

Chinese singing competition television show

- Genre: Reality competition
- Based on: King of Mask Singer by Munhwa Broadcasting Corporation
- Presented by: Li Hao
- Starring: Eric Moo; Annie Yi; Dai Jun; Li Chen; Li Xiang; Sun Hao
- Country of origin: China
- Original language: Chinese
- No. of seasons: 2
- No. of episodes: 11

Original release
- Network: Jiangsu Television
- Release: July 19 – September 27, 2015

King of Mask Singer is a Chinese reality singing competition television series based on the Masked Singer franchise which originated from the South Korean version of the show King of Mask Singer. It premiered on Jiangsu Television on July 19, 2015.
