= The Masked Singer (Arabic TV series) =

Arabic television series

The Masked Singer - Inta Min (Egyptian Arabic: انت مين؟, romanized: ʾinta mīn?, "Who Are You?") is a Pan-Arabic television series filmed in the United Arab Emirates. The series premiered on MBC 1 on December 9, 2020; and concluded on February 11, 2021.

== Contestants ==
Results
Stage name	Celebrity	Country of origin	Occupation(s)	Episodes									
Stage name	Celebrity	Country of origin	Occupation(s)	1	2	3	4	5	6	7	8	9	10
Cobra	Ehab Tawfik	Egypt	Singer	SAFE		SAFE		SAFE	SAFE	SAFE	SAFE	SAFE	WINNER
Cheetah	Amel Bouchoucha	Algeria	Actress		SAFE		SAFE	SAFE	SAFE	SAFE	SAFE	SAFE	RUNNER-UP
Wolf	Waed	Saudi Arabia	Singer	SAFE		SAFE		SAFE	SAFE	SAFE	SAFE	SAFE	THIRD
Peacock	Dima Kandalaft	Syria	Actress/Singer	SAFE		SAFE		SAFE	SAFE	SAFE	SAFE	OUT	
Scheherazade	Somaya El Khashab	Egypt	Singer/Actress		SAFE		SAFE	SAFE	SAFE	SAFE	OUT		
Falcon	Neshan	Lebanon	Journalist		SAFE		SAFE	SAFE	SAFE	OUT			
Nefertiti	Nadia Al-Gindi	Egypt	Actress	SAFE		SAFE		SAFE	OUT				
Unicorn	Shaila Sabt	Bahrain	Actress/Model		SAFE		SAFE	OUT					
Flower	Maram Al Balushi	Kuwait	Actress		SAFE		OUT						
Monster	Faudel	Algeria/France	Singer	SAFE		OUT							
Gorilla	Kahraba	Egypt	Soccer player		OUT								
Lion	Dhaffer L'Abidine	Tunisia	Actor	OUT									
