= The Masked Singer Malta =

Maltese singing competition TV show

- Genre: Reality competition; Panel show
- Based on: King of Mask Singer by Munhwa Broadcasting Corporation
- Presented by: Alan Montanaro
- Starring: Amber Bondin; Josmar Gatt; Ryan Borg; Valentina Rossi
- Country of origin: Malta
- No. of seasons: 1
- No. of episodes: 10

Original release
- Network: TVM
- Release: 24 April – 10 July 2025

Related
- Masked Singer franchise

The Masked Singer Malta is the Maltese version of the reality singing show The Masked Singer. It is based on the South Korean television show King of Mask Singer. The Maltese version aired on TVM and began on 24 April 2025. The final was aired on 10 July 2025, with Gianni Zammit winning as "Garbage Monster".

== Contestants ==
There were twelve participants.

Stage name	Celebrity	Occupation	Episodes										
Stage name	Celebrity	Occupation	1	2	3	4	5	6	7	8	9	10	
Stage name	Celebrity	Occupation	1	2	3	4	5	6	7	8	9	A	B
Garbage Monster	Gianni Zammit	Actor/Presenter		WIN		SAFE	SAFE	SAFE	SAFE	SAFE	SAFE	SAFE	WINNER
Merill "Blue Rock Thrush"	Kevin Borg	Singer	WIN		SAFE		SAFE	SAFE	RISK	SAFE	SAFE	SAFE	RUNNER-UP
Bajda "Egg"	Brooke Borg	Singer	WIN		SAFE		SAFE	SAFE	SAFE	SAFE	RISK	THIRD	
Bajtra "Prickly Pear"	Gaia Cauchi	Singer		WIN		SAFE	SAFE	SAFE	SAFE	RISK	OUT		
Lampuka "Mahi-mahi"	Fabrizio Faniello	Singer		RISK		RISK	RISK	SAFE	SAFE	OUT			
Ħalib "Milk"	Janvil	Singer/Presenter		WIN		SAFE	SAFE	RISK	OUT				
Gallarija "Balcony"	Jamie Cardona	Actor/Presenter	RISK		RISK		SAFE	OUT					
Widnet il-Baħar "Maltese Centaury"	Jacqui Losco	Model/Dancer	RISK		SAFE		OUT						
Kavallier "Knight"	Tiffany Pisani	Model		RISK		OUT							
Gardjola	Christine Haber	Actress	WIN		OUT								
Tal-Linja "Bus"	Xandru Grech	Athlete		OUT									
Maduma "Tile"	Rodney Gauchi	Actor	OUT										

The masked singer won their face-off and remained in the competition.
The masked singer lost their face-off and was in the bottom two, but was not eliminated.
The masked singer was safe from elimination.
The masked singer was eliminated from the competition and unmasked upon their elimination.

== Episodes ==
=== Week 1 (24 April) ===
Performances in the first episode
#	Stage name	Song	Identity	Result
1	Merill	"I Don't Want to Miss a Thing" by Aerosmith	undisclosed	WIN
2	Gallarija	"Beggin'" by Måneskin	undisclosed	RISK
3	Widnet il-Baħar	"Flowers" by Miley Cyrus	undisclosed	RISK
4	Gardjola	"SOS" by ABBA	undisclosed	WIN
5	Maduma	"My Way" by Frank Sinatra	Rodney Gauchi	OUT
6	Bajda	"I Wanna Dance with Somebody" by Whitney Houston	undisclosed	WIN

=== Week 2 (1 May) ===
Performances in the second episode
#	Stage name	Song	Identity	Result
1	Tal-Linja	"Seven Nation Army" by The White Stripes	Xandru Grech	OUT
2	Ħalib	"Milkshake" by Kelis	undisclosed	WIN
3	Bajtra	"Espresso" by Sabrina Carpenter	undisclosed	WIN
4	Kavallier	"Knock on Wood" by Amii Stewart	undisclosed	RISK
5	Garbage Monster	"Poison" by Alice Cooper	undisclosed	WIN
6	Lampuka	"Under the Sea" from The Little Mermaid	undisclosed	RISK

=== Week 3 (8 May) ===
- Group number: "Let's Get Loud" by Jennifer Lopez

Performances in the third episode
#	Stage name	Song	Identity	Result
1	Gallarija	"Never Gonna Give You Up" by Rick Astley	undisclosed	RISK
2	Bajda	"Come Together" by The Beatles	undisclosed	SAFE
3	Gardjola	"Material Girl" by Madonna	Christine Haber	OUT
4	Merill	"Total Eclipse of the Heart" by Bonnie Tyler	undisclosed	SAFE
5	Widnet il-Baħar	"...Baby One More Time" by Britney Spears	undisclosed	SAFE

=== Week 4 (22 May) ===
- Group number: "Bad Romance" by Lady Gaga

Performances in the fourth episode
#	Stage name	Song	Identity	Result
1	Ħalib	"Can't Take My Eyes Off You" by Boys Town Gang	undisclosed	SAFE
2	Bajtra	"Angels" by Robbie Williams	undisclosed	SAFE
3	Kavallier	"I Was Made for Lovin' You" by KISS	Tiffany Pisani	OUT
4	Lampuka	"I Just Called to Say I Love You" by Stevie Wonder	undisclosed	RISK
5	Garbage Monster	"Summer of '69" by Bryan Adams	undisclosed	SAFE

=== Week 5 (29 May) ===
Performances in the fifth episode
#	Stage name	Song	Identity	Result
1	Lampuka	"Livin' la Vida Loca" by Ricky Martin	undisclosed	RISK
2	Gallarija	"Teenage Dirtbag" by Wheatus	undisclosed	SAFE
3	Merill	"Don't Stop Believin'" by Journey	undisclosed	SAFE
4	Garbage Monster	"Here I Go Again" by Whitesnake	undisclosed	SAFE
5	Bajda	"So What" by Pink	undisclosed	SAFE
6	Widnet il-Baħar	"Wannabe" by Spice Girls	Jacqui Losco	OUT
7	Bajtra	"7 Rings" by Ariana Grande	undisclosed	SAFE
8	Ħalib	"Sex Bomb" by Tom Jones and Mousse T.	undisclosed	SAFE

=== Week 6 (5 June) ===
Performances in the sixth episode
#	Stage name	Song	Identity	Result
1	Bajtra	"Unwritten" by Natasha Bedingfield	undisclosed	SAFE
2	Lampuka	"Blue Suede Shoes" by Elvis Presley	undisclosed	SAFE
3	Merill	"Africa" by Toto	undisclosed	SAFE
4	Ħalib	"Happy" by Pharrell Williams	undisclosed	RISK
5	Bajda	"Skyfall" by Adele	undisclosed	SAFE
6	Gallarija	"One Way or Another" by Blondie	Jamie Cardona	OUT
7	Garbage Monster	"Mambo No 5." by Lou Bega	undisclosed	SAFE

=== Week 7 (12 June) ===
Performances in the seventh episode
#	Stage name	Song	Identity	Result
1	Garbage Monster	"Barbara Ann" by The Beach Boys	undisclosed	SAFE
2	Lampuka	"Footloose" by Kenny Loggins	undisclosed	SAFE
3	Bajtra	"Shake It Off" by Taylor Swift	undisclosed	SAFE
4	Ħalib	"Feeling Good" by Nina Simone	Janvil	OUT
5	Merill	"Wake Me Up Before You Go Go" by Wham!	undisclosed	RISK
6	Bajda	"Never Enough" from The Greatest Showman	undisclosed	SAFE

=== Week 8 (19 June) ===
- Group number: "Everybody (Backstreet's Back)" by Backstreet Boys

Performances in the eighth episode
#	Stage name	Song	Identity	Result
1	Merill	"It's All Coming Back to Me Now" by Céline Dion	undisclosed	SAFE
2	Lampuka	"Hero" by Enrique Iglesias	Fabrizio Faniello	OUT
3	Garbage Monster	"Mamma Mia" by ABBA	undisclosed	SAFE
4	Bajtra	"Shout Out to My Ex" by Little Mix	undisclosed	RISK
5	Bajda	"Halo" by Beyoncé	undisclosed	SAFE

=== Week 9 (26 June) ===
- Group number: "We Will Rock You" by Queen

Performances in the ninth episode
#	Stage name	Song	Identity	Result
1	Bajda	"Believe" by Cher	undisclosed	RISK
2	Bajtra	"Umbrella" by Rihanna feat. Jay-Z	undisclosed	RISK
3	Garbage Monster	"Let Me Entertain You" by Robbie Williams	undisclosed	SAFE
4	Merill	"I Have Nothing" by Whitney Houston	undisclosed	SAFE
Sing-off details			Identity	Result
1	Bajtra	"Only Love Can Hurt Like This" by Paloma Faith	Gaia Cauchi	OUT
2	Bajda	"Bang Bang" by Jessie J, Ariana Grande and Nicki Minaj	undisclosed	SAFE

=== Week 10 (10 July) ===
- Group number: "Celebration" by Kool & The Gang

Performances in the tenth episode
#	Stage name	Song	Duet partner	Identity	Result
1	Garbage Monster	"Tubthumping" by Chumbawamba	Jamie Cardona (Gallarija)	undisclosed	SAFE
2	Merill	"Beneath Your Beautiful" by Labrinth	Jacqui Losco (Widnet il-Baħar)	undisclosed	SAFE
3	Bajda	"Sal-Aħħar nifs" by Claudia Faniello & Fabrizio Faniello	Fabrizio Faniello (Lampuka)	Brooke Borg	THIRD
Sing-off details				Identity	Result
1	Garbage Monster	"Radio Ga Ga" by Queen		Gianni Zammit	WINNER
2	Merill	"Someone You Loved" by Lewis Capaldi		Kevin Borg	RUNNER-UP
