= Ankhmaa =

Mongolian singer, actress and producer (born 1986)

Anhkmaa Ганхуяг Анхмаа
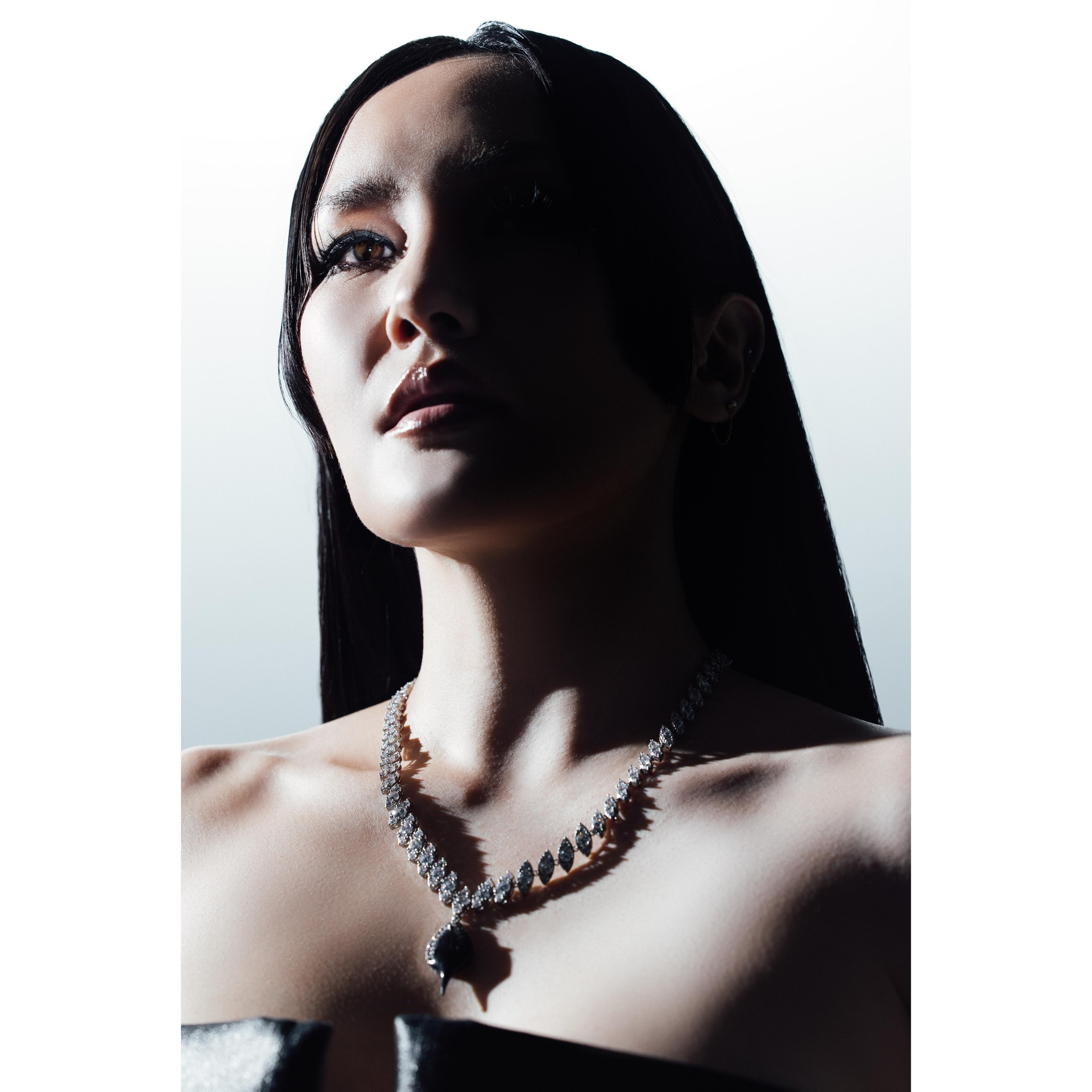
- Ankhmaa on the stage

Background information
- Also known as: Ankhmaa
- Born: Ankhmaa Gankhuyag; April 28, 1986 (age 39); Ulaanbaatar, Mongolia
- Origin: Ulaanbaatar, Mongolia
- Genres: Pop
- Occupations: Singer; Actor; Film producer
- Instrument: Vocals
- Years active: 2004–present
- Label: ANA Entertainment

Ankhmaa Gankhuyag (Mongolian: Ганхуяг Анхмаа), known professionally as Ankhmaa is a Mongolian singer, actress, and producer (born April 28, 1986 in Ulaanbaatar, Mongolia). She was graduated from Music and Dance College of Mongolia in 2001 as a professional pianist. In 2007, she finished Mongolian State University of Arts and Culture. During the years at Mongolian State University of Arts and Culture, she started her singing career in 2005 with the band 3 Охин ("three girls"). Since 2019, she pursued her solo career.

== Life and career ==
Ankhmaa's mother was a teacher at Mongolian State University of Arts and Culture which influenced her to grow up close with music and art. Since 2005, "Three girls" band released six albums, more than thirty music videos and three concerts.

In 2017, she founded "ANA Entertainment". Entertainment's first film is "Uur Tsaigaasai" directed by Sengedorj J, author Battushig A, produced by Ankhmaa. the film released on May 10, 2017.

Beginning of 2019, Ankhmaa started her solo career with her debut single "Bi Chinii Hairtai Busgui". Later on in April, her music video for "Tengeriin Shigtgee" featuring Batchuluun from (Niciton band) released.

== Discography ==
=== Singles ===
- "Waiting For You"
- "Tsoo Shirt"
- "Bi Chinii Hairtai Busgui"
- "Hair Chi Irsen" (Uur Tsaigaasai – original motion picture soundtrack)
- "Tengeriin Shigtgee" (feat. Batchuluun)

== Filmography ==
Film
Year	Title	Role	Notes
2017	Uur Tsaigaasai	Undral	Executive producer & main character
2015	Учрал	Tuul	Main character
2012	Origin	–	Main character
2011	French Kiss	Misheel	Main character
2009	Say Kilometer	–	Main character
