= The Masked Singer (German TV series) season 8 =

The Masked Singer
- Season 8
- Starring: Ruth Moschner; Rea Garvey; Various guests
- Hosted by: Matthias Opdenhövel
- No. of contestants: 9
- Winner: Luca Hänni as "Schuhschnabel"
- Runner-up: Felicitas Woll as "Igel"
- No. of episodes: 6

Release
- Original network: ProSieben
- Original release: 1 April – 6 May 2023

Season chronology
- ← Previous; Season 7 Next → Season 9

The eighth season of the German singing competition The Masked Singer premiered on 1 April 2023 on ProSieben.

== Panelists and host ==
Season 8 main panelists and host

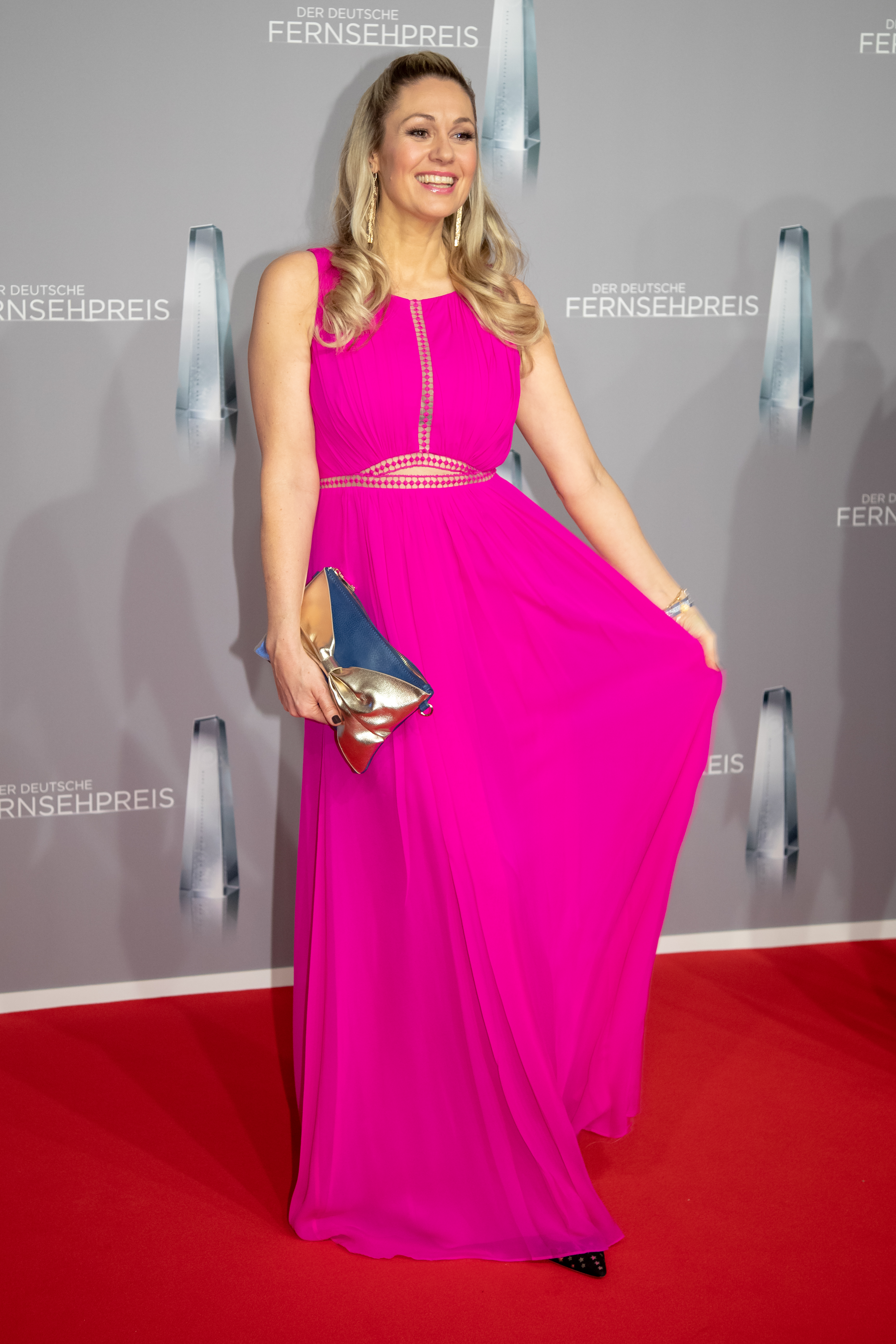
Ruth Moschner

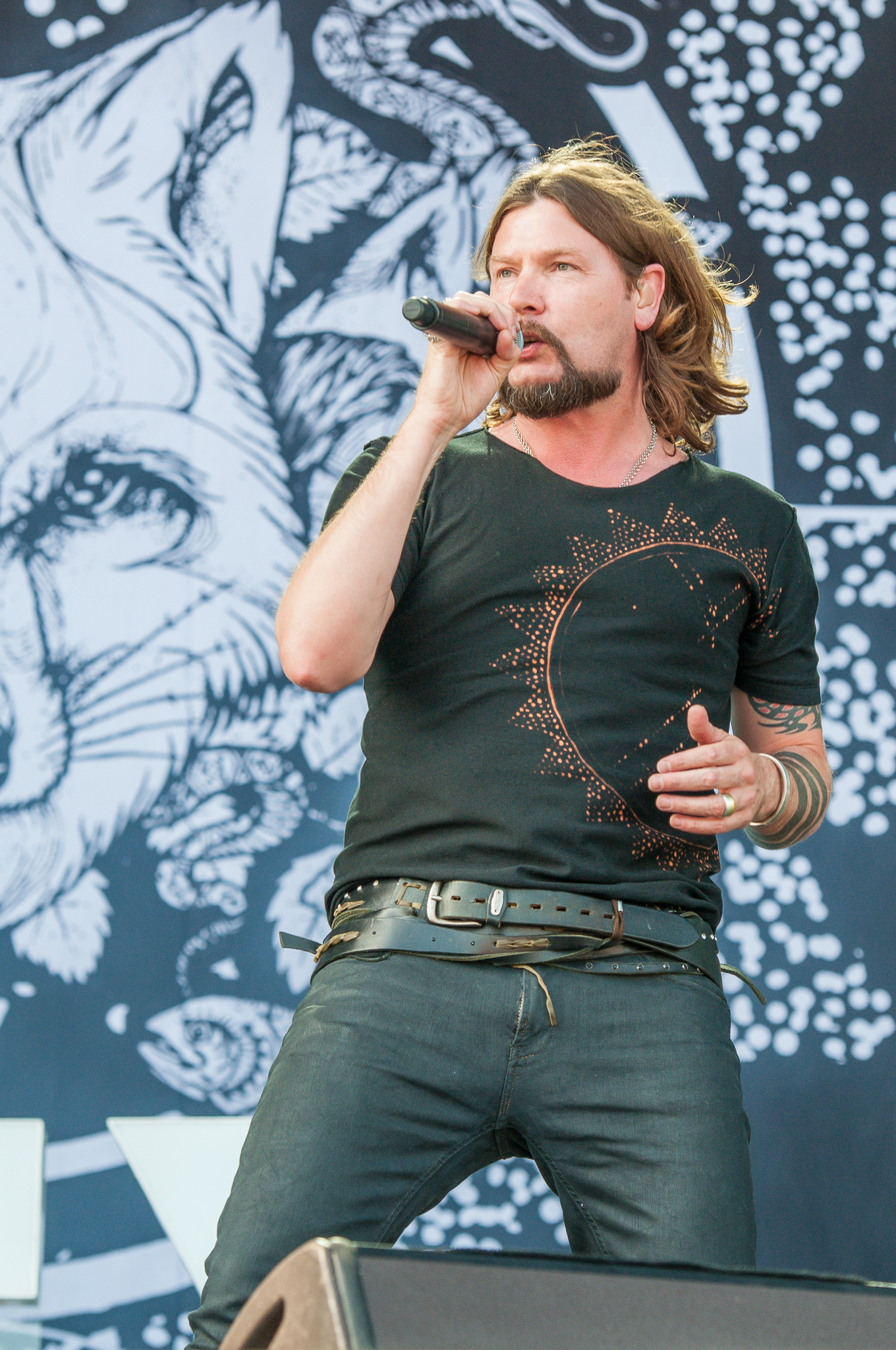
Rea Garvey

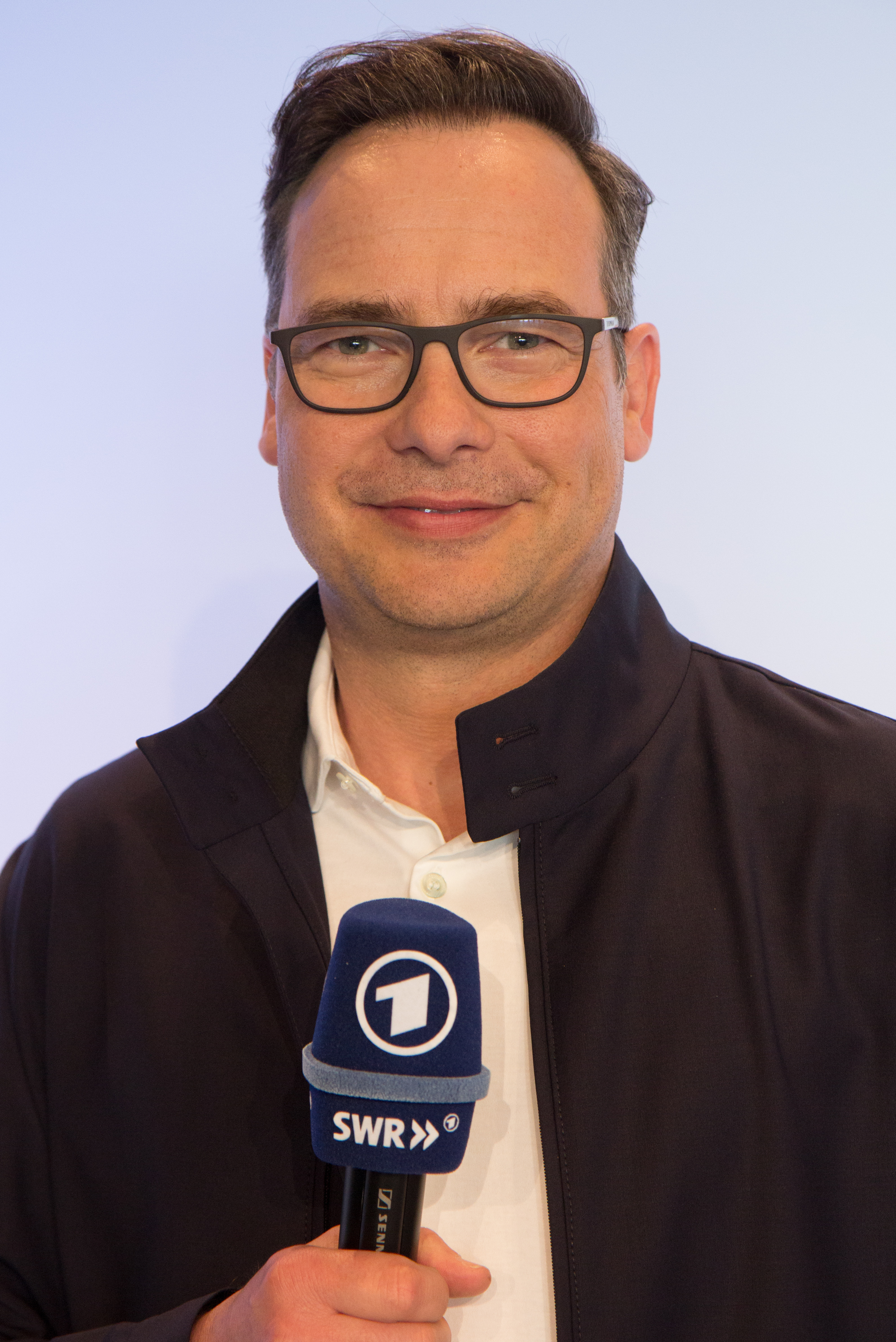
Matthias Opdenhövel

TV Presenter Ruth Moschner returned for her seventh season, and Rea Garvey for his fifth season as panelists. Matthias Opdenhövel returned for his eighth season as host.

As in previous seasons, a spin-off show named The Masked Singer - red. Special aired after each live episode.

=== Guest panelists ===
Various guest panelists appeared as the third judge in the judging panel for one episode. These guest panelists included:

Season 8 guest panelists

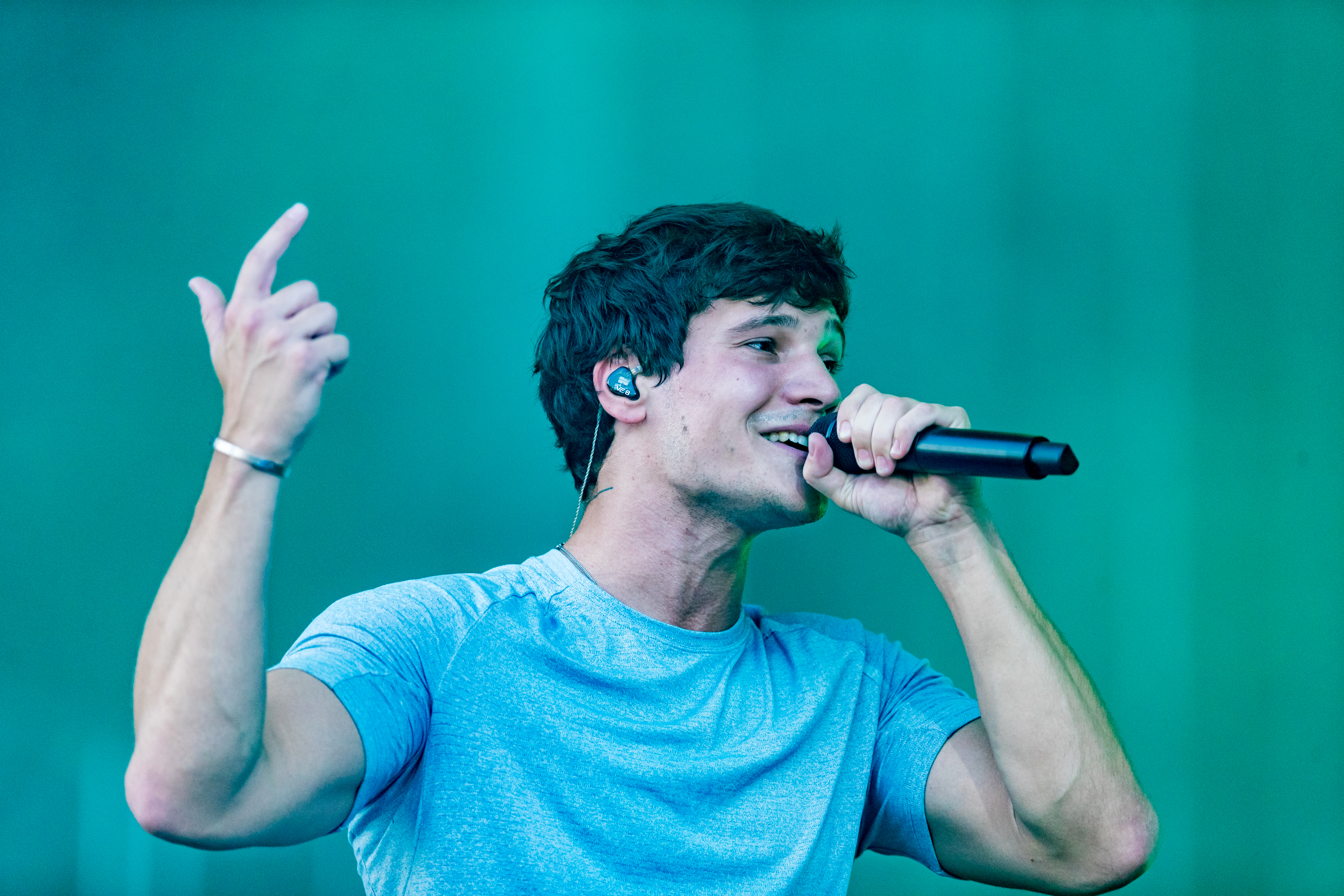
Wincent Weiss (episode 1)

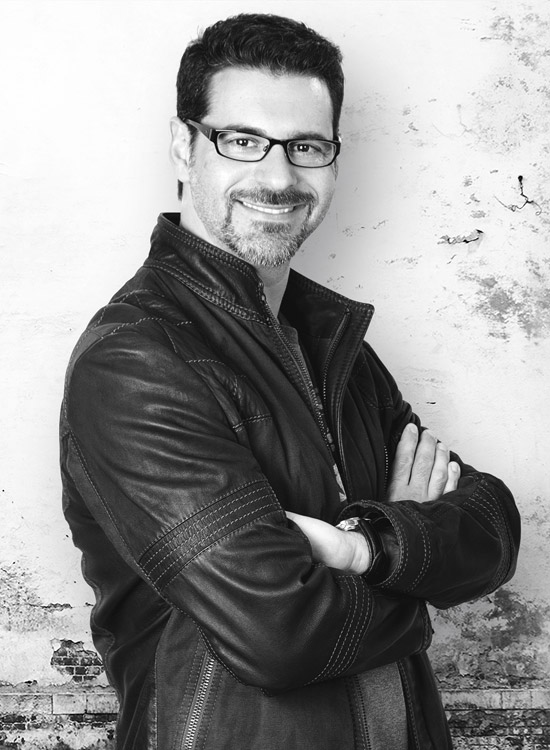
Rick Kavanian (episode 2)

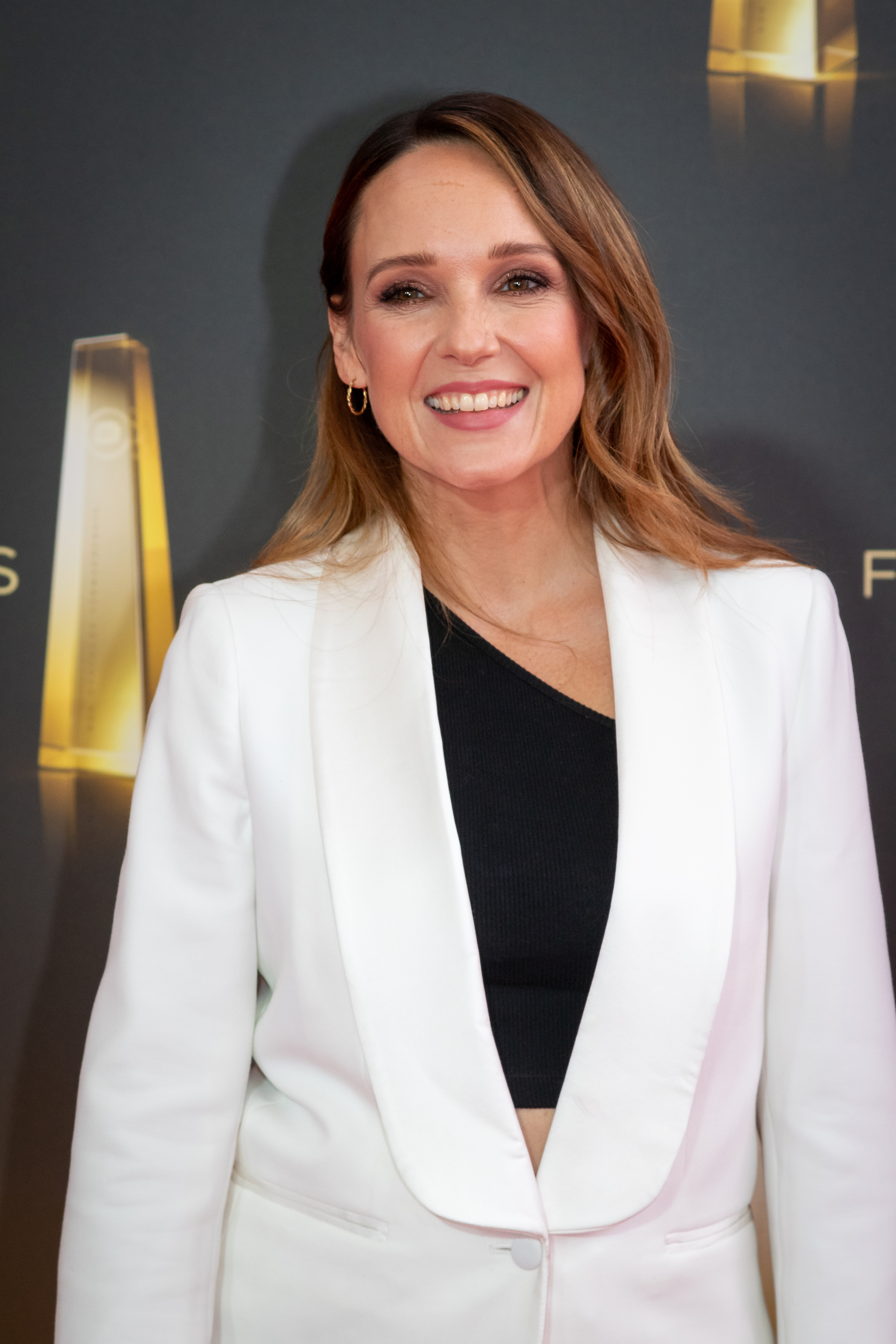
Carolin Kebekus (episode 3)

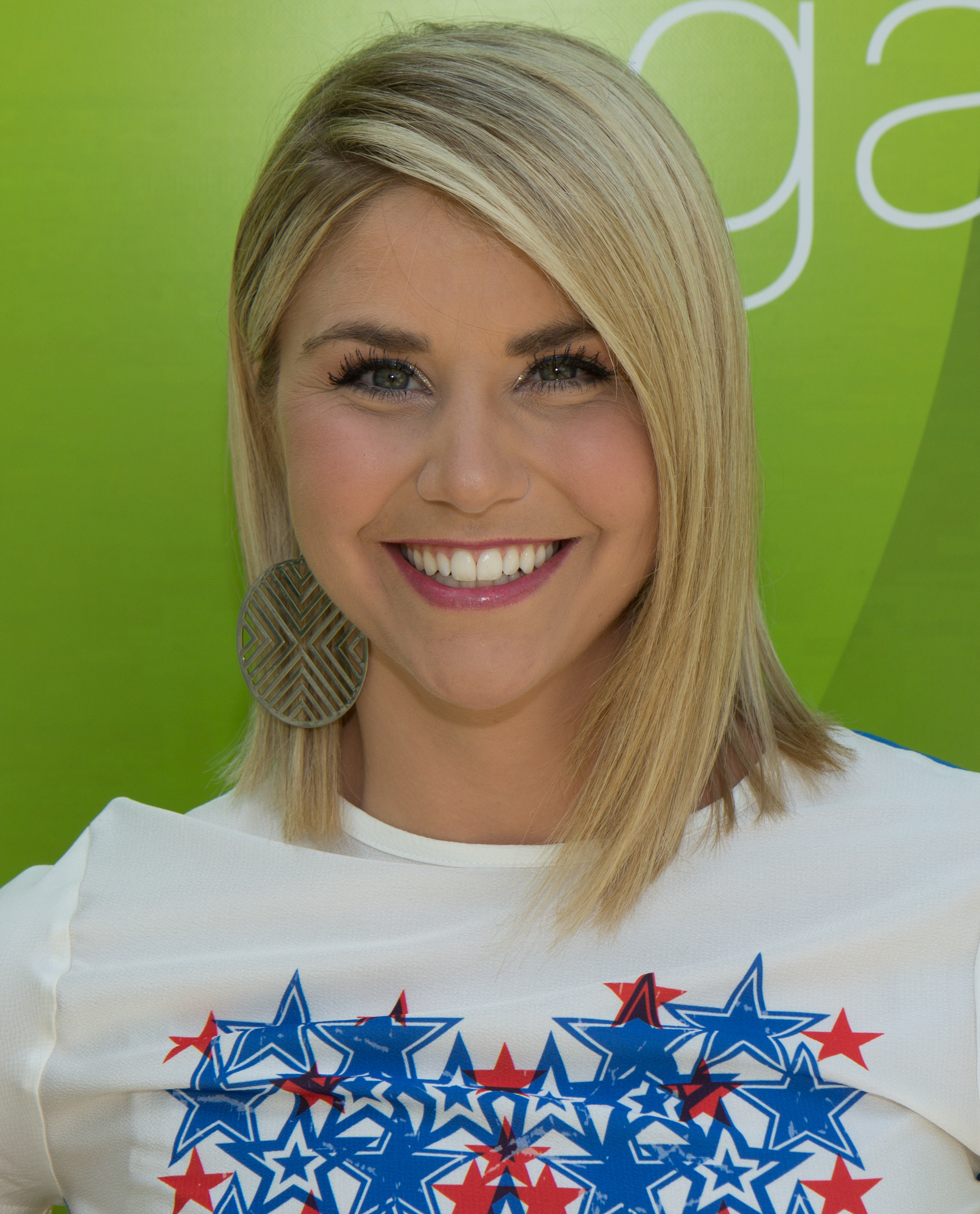
Beatrice Egli (episode 4)

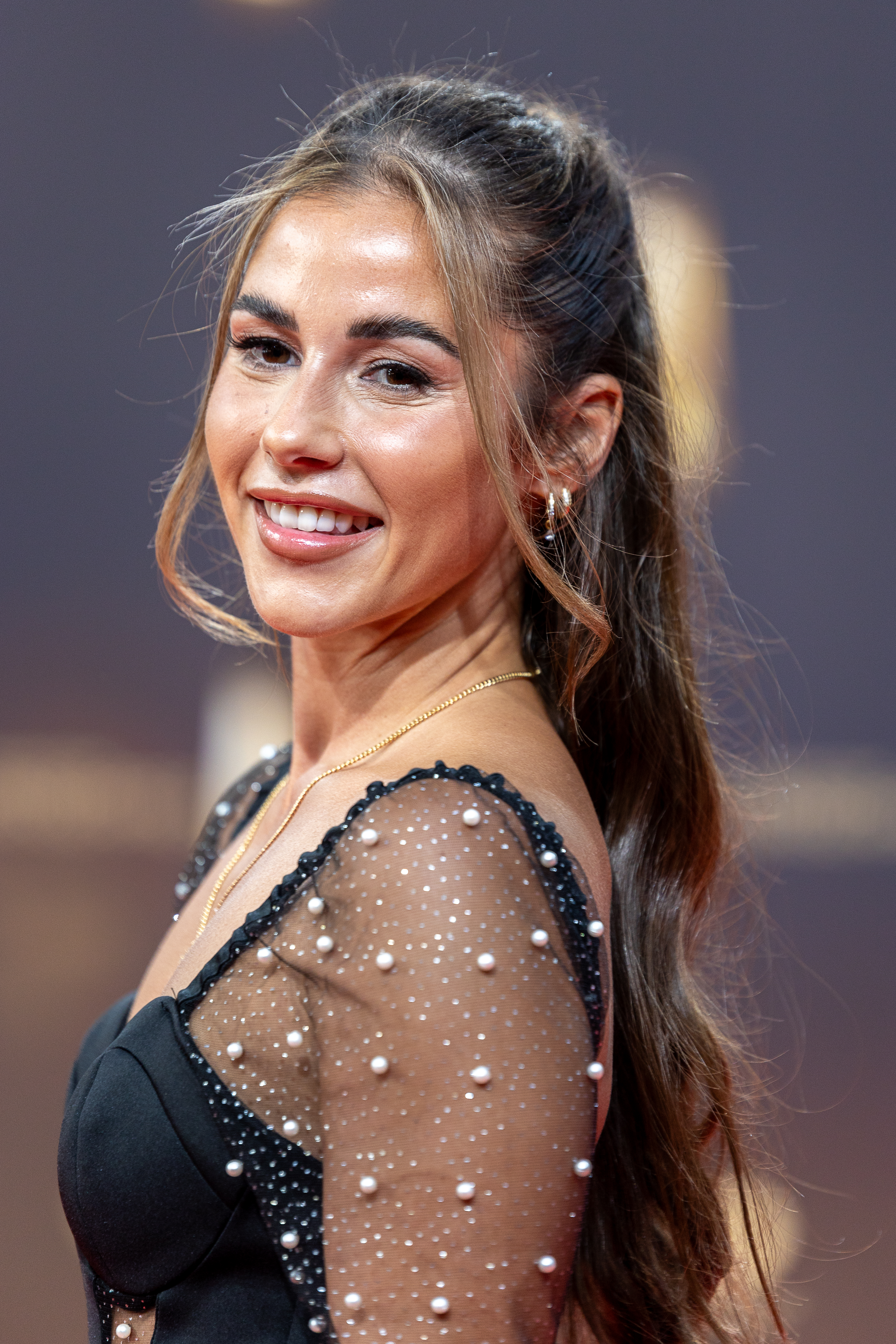
Sarah Engels (episode 5)

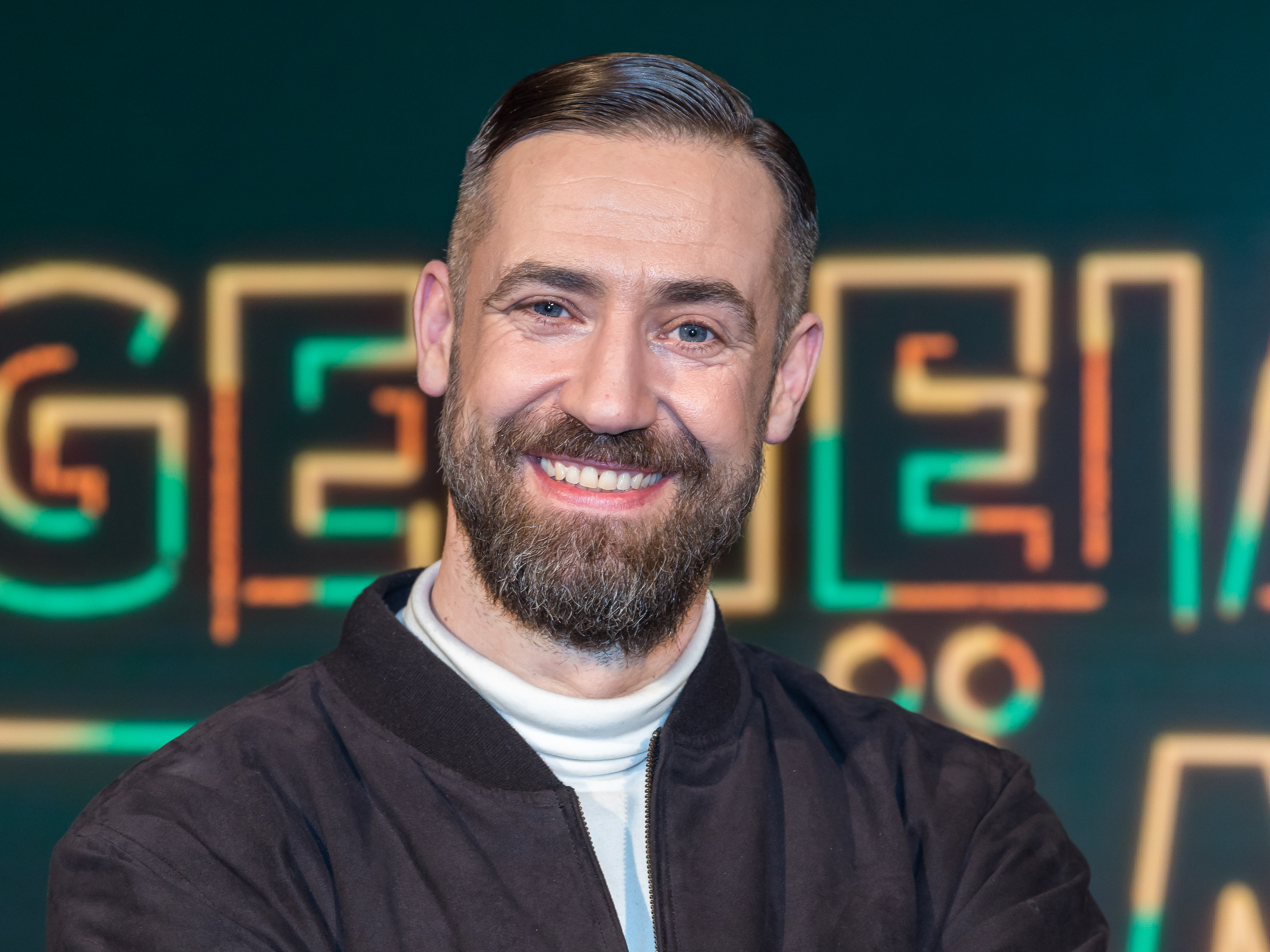
Bürger Lars Dietrich (episode 6)

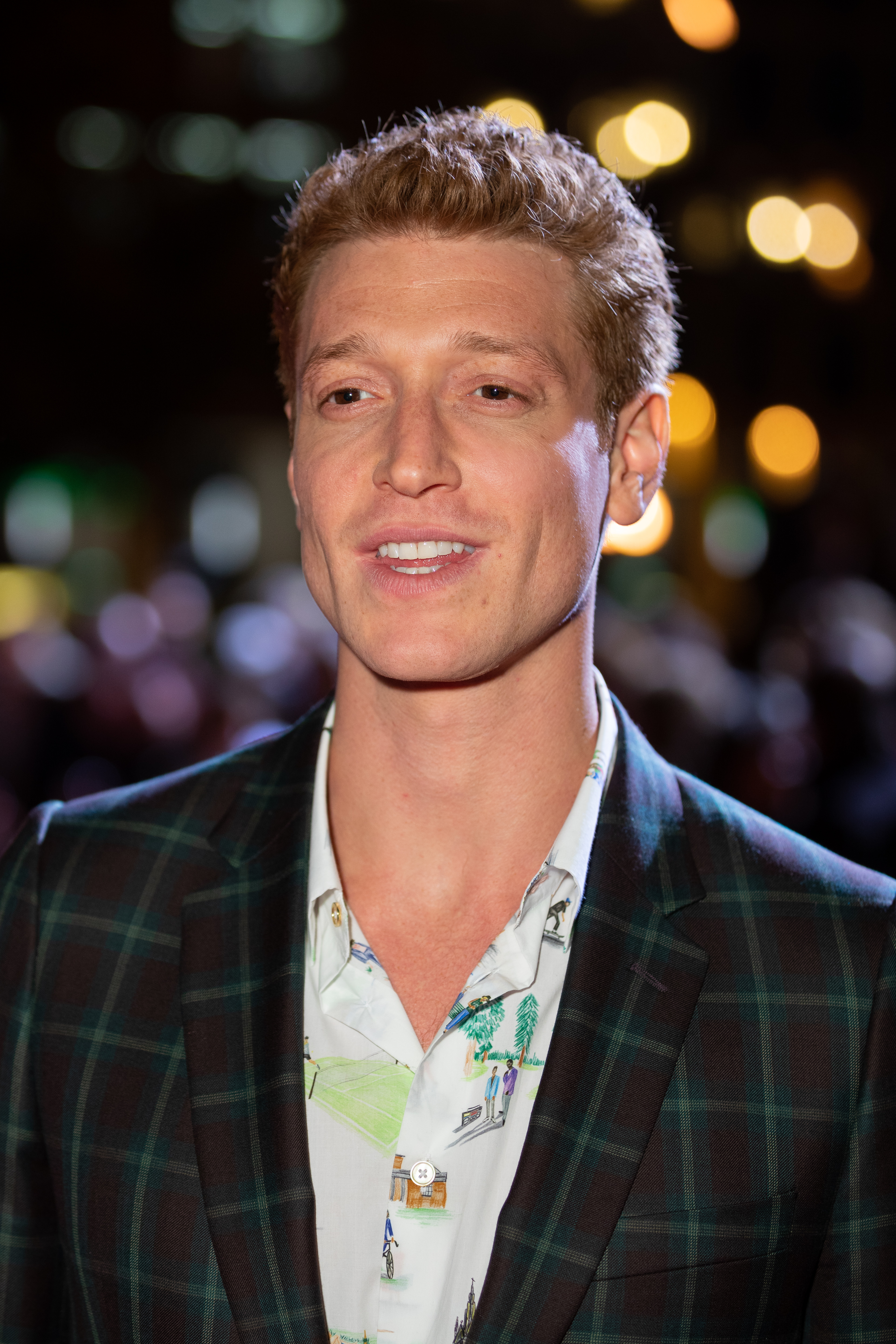
Daniel Donskoy (episode 6)

Episode	Guest Panelist	Notability
1	Wincent Weiss	Singer
2	Rick Kavanian	Actor/Comedian
3	Carolin Kebekus	Comedian
4	Beatrice Egli	Musician/Singer
5	Sarah Engels	Singer
6	Daniel Donskoy, Bürger Lars Dietrich	Actor, Musician/Comedian

== Contestants ==
The season features 9 contestants.

Results
Stage name	Celebrity	Notability	Live Episodes							
Stage name	Celebrity	Notability	1	2	3	4	5	6		
Stage name	Celebrity	Notability	1	2	3	4	5	A	B	C
Schuhschnabel "Shoebill"	Luca Hänni	Singer	WIN	WIN	WIN	WIN	WIN	SAFE	SAFE	WINNER
Igel "Hedgehog"	Felicitas Woll	Actress	WIN	RISK	RISK	WIN	WIN	SAFE	SAFE	RUNNER-UP
Mystica (Note: The character was initially named "Diamantula" up to Episode 5, where her name was officially changed to Mystica.)	Patricia Kelly	Singer	WIN	WIN	WIN	WIN	RISK	SAFE	THIRD	
Frotteefant "Terrycloth Elephant"	Melissa Khalaj	TV Presenter	WIN	WIN	RISK	RISK	RISK	OUT		
Toast	Inka Bause	TV Presenter	WIN	WIN	RISK	RISK	OUT			
Seepferdchen "Seahorse"	Anna Loos	Actress	RISK	RISK	WIN	OUT				
Pilz "Mushroom"	Marianne Rosenberg	Singer	RISK	RISK	OUT					
Waschbär "Raccoon"	Daniel Boschmann	TV Presenter	WIN	OUT						
Känguru "Kangaroo"	Jan Josef Liefers	Actor	OUT							

The masked singer won their face-off and remained in the competition.
The masked singer lost their face-off and was in the bottom four/three/two, but was not eliminated.
The masked singer was safe from elimination.
The masked singer was eliminated from the competition and unmasked upon their elimination.
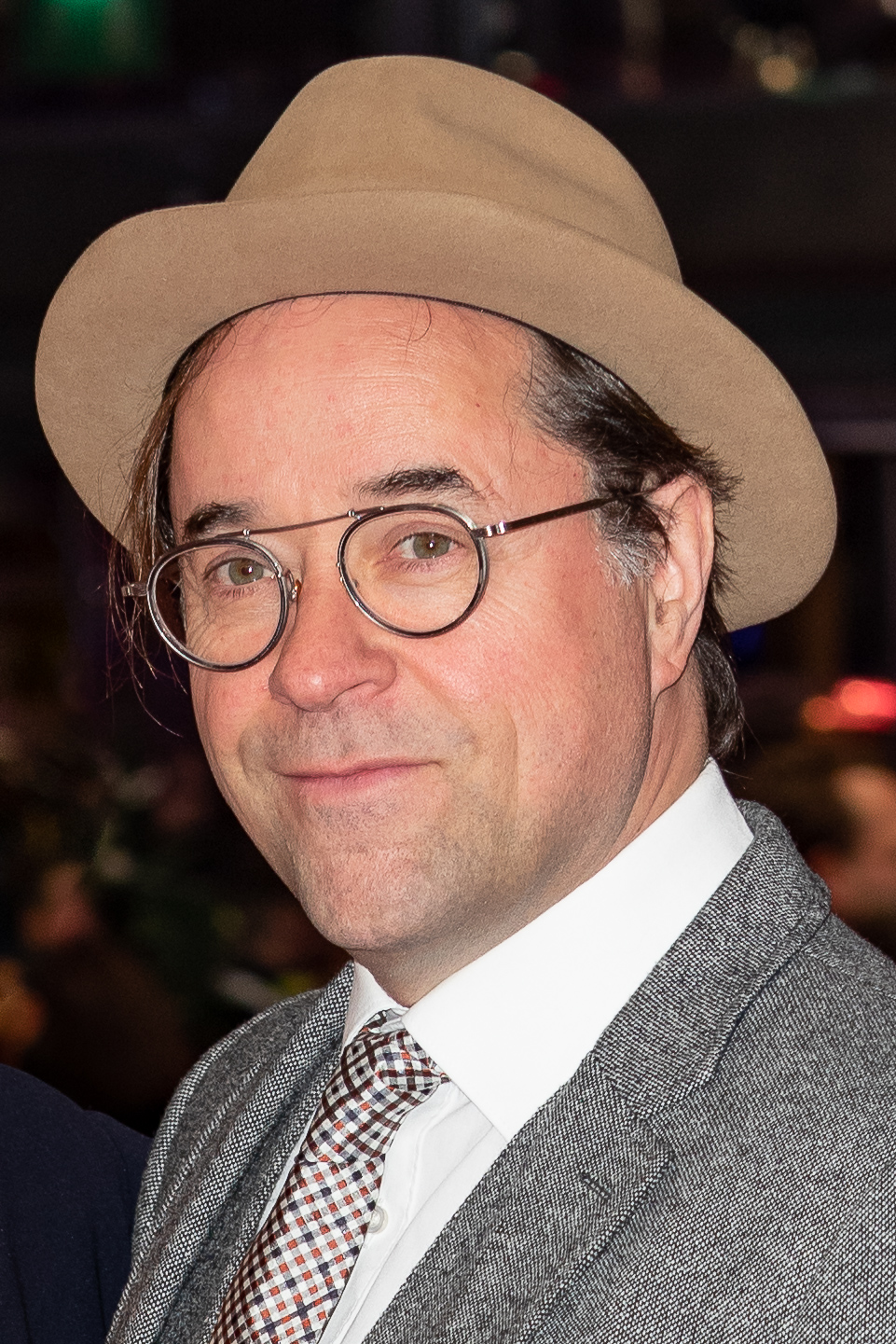
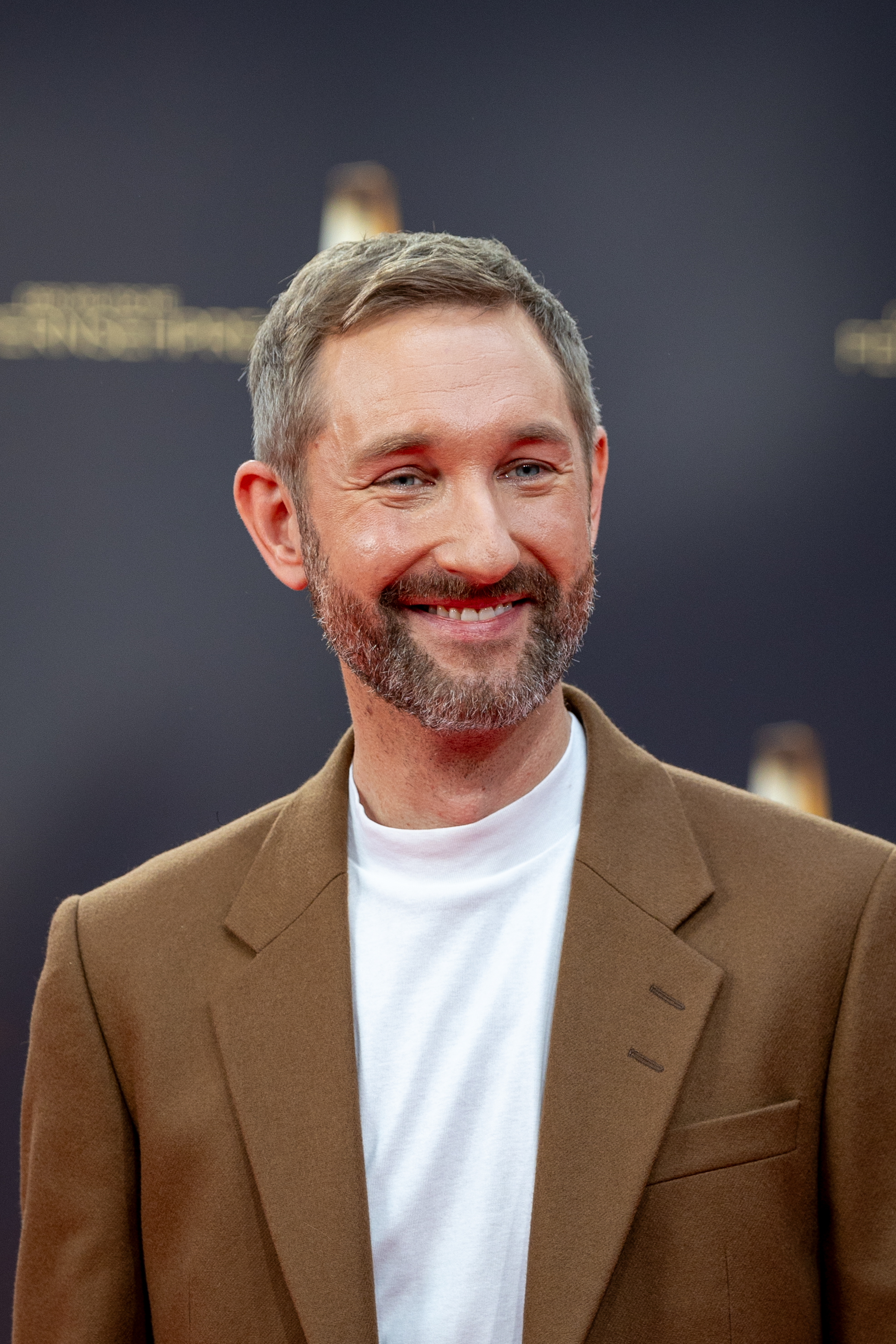
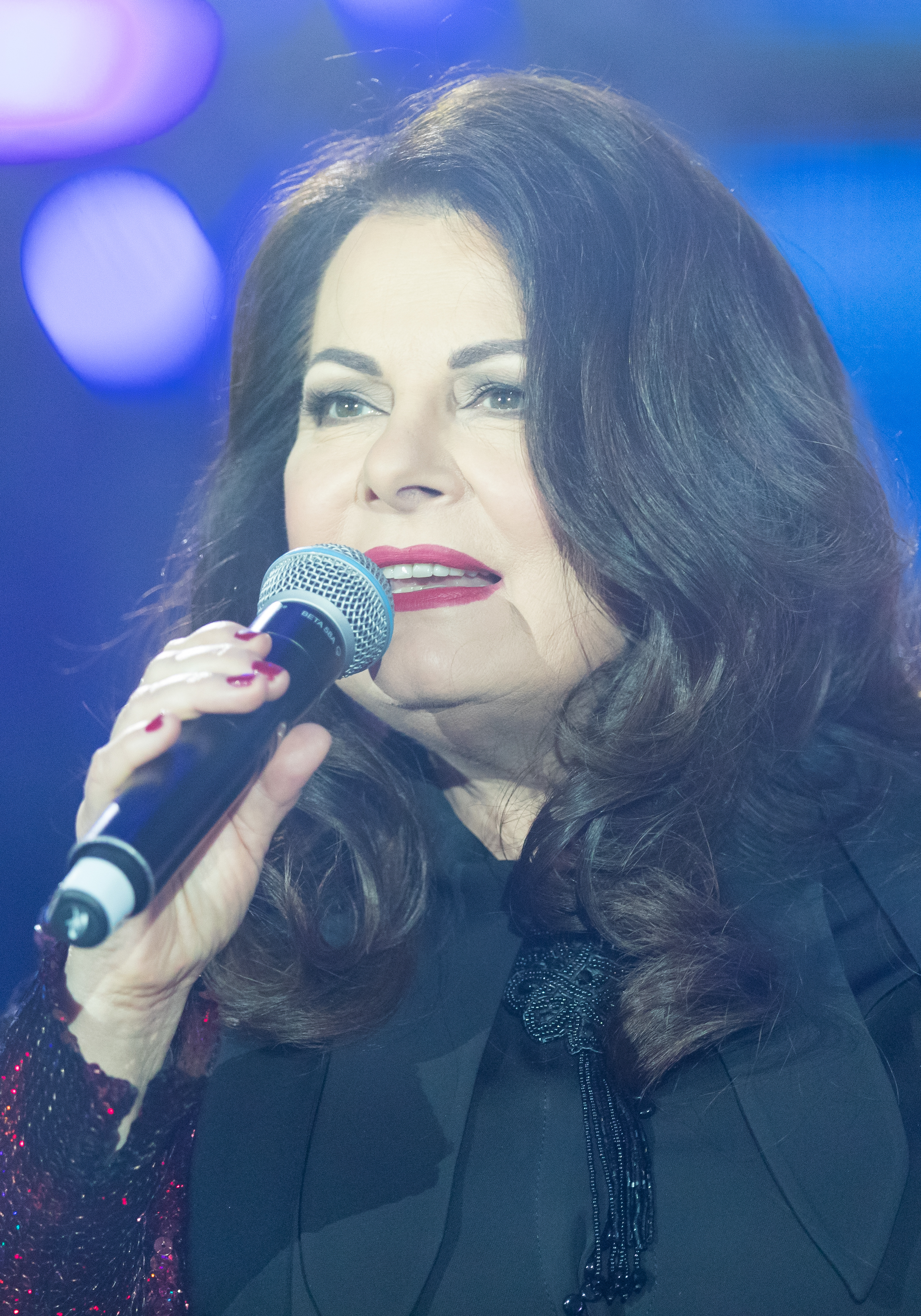
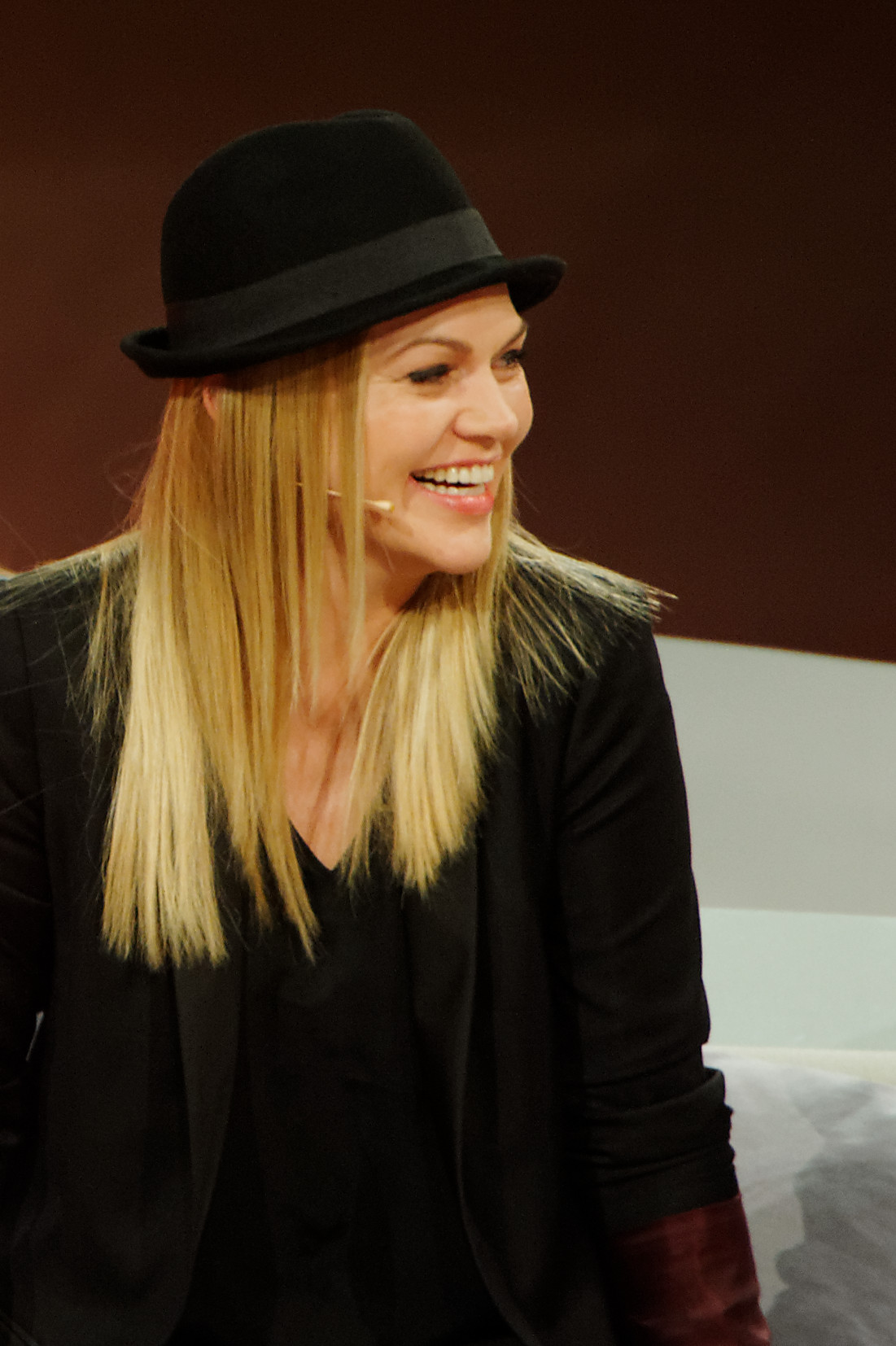
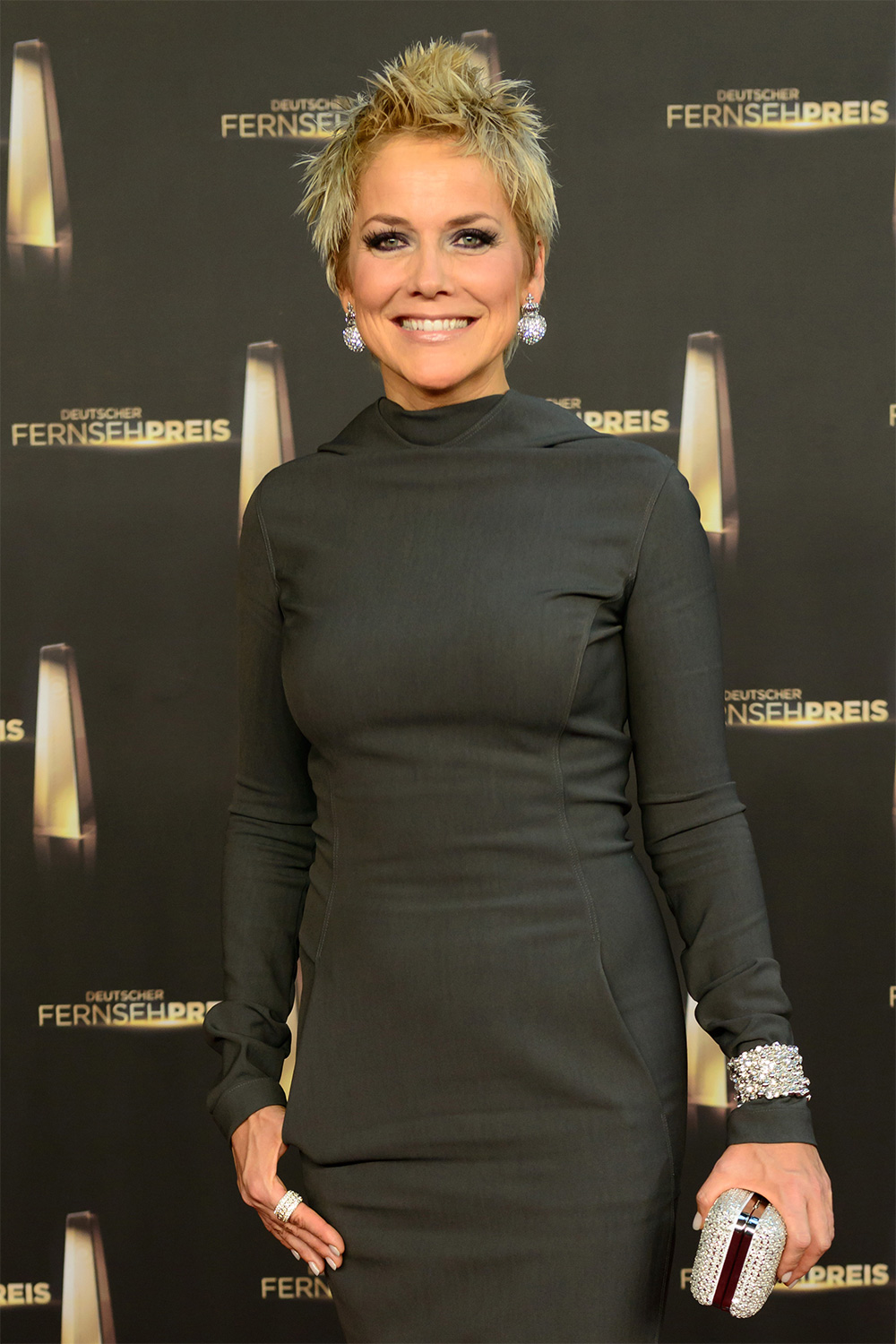
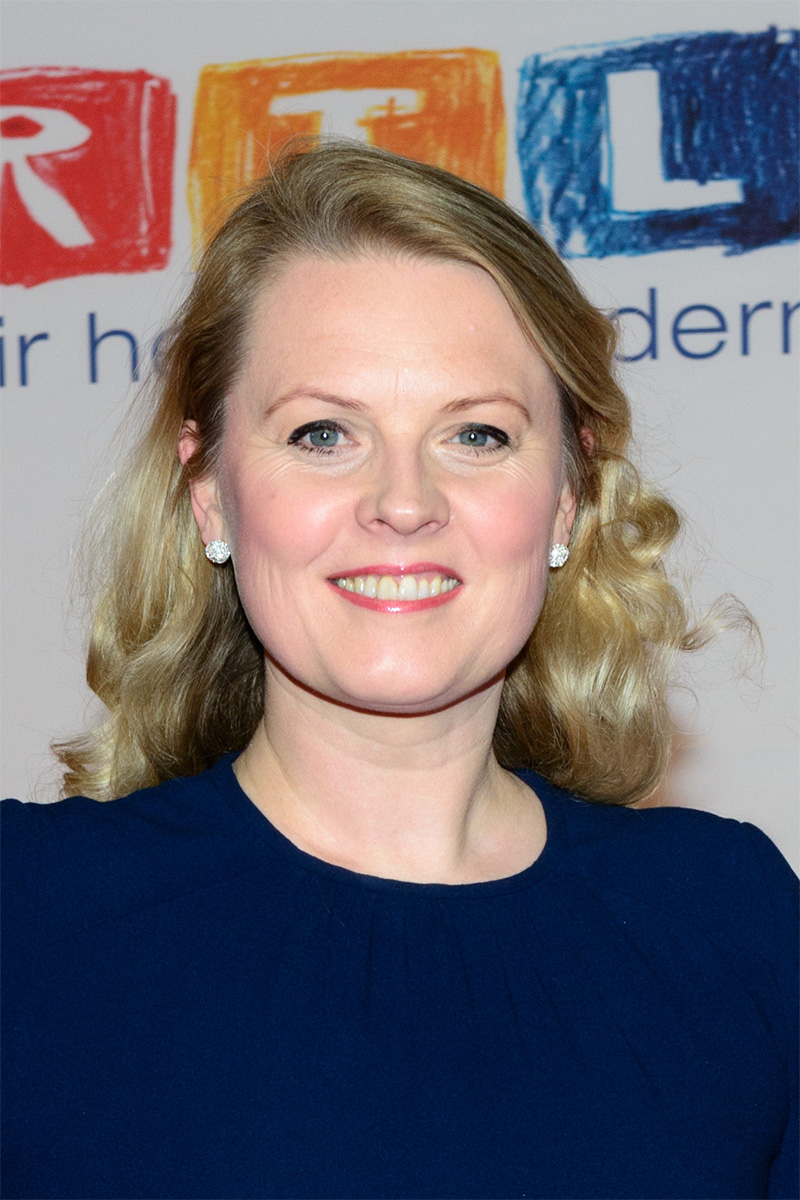
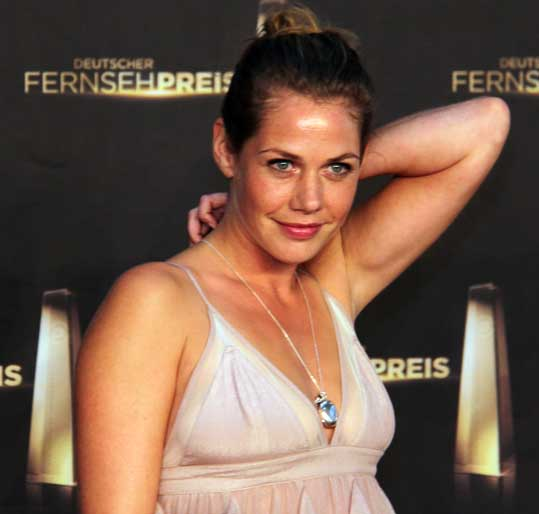
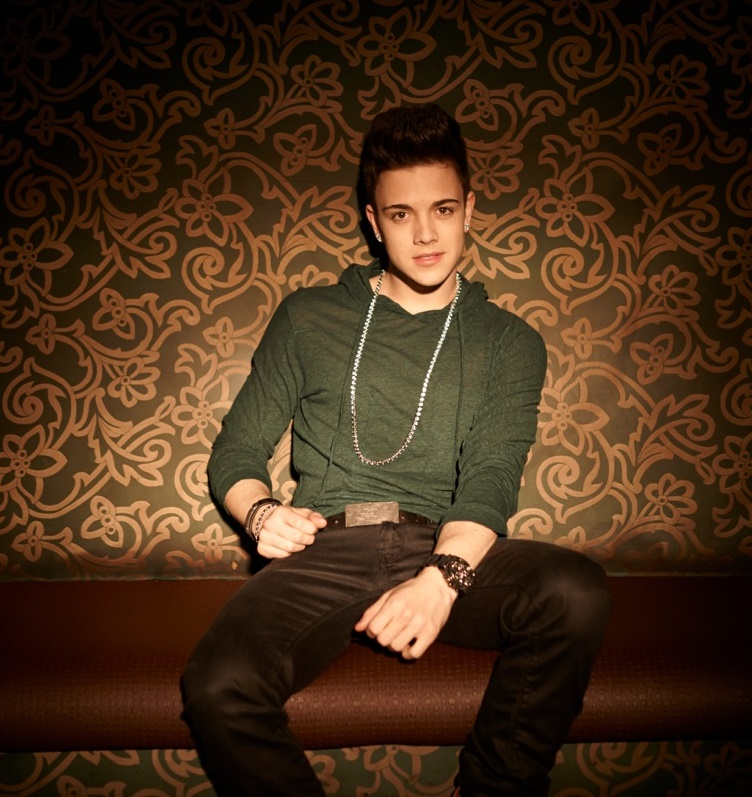
The celebrities who have competed in the eighth season of The Masked Singer, pictured in order of elimination (l-r):
Jan Josef Liefers ("Känguru"), Daniel Boschmann ("Waschbär"), Marianne Rosenberg ("Pilz"), Anna Loos ("Seepferdchen"), Inka Bause ("Toast"), Patricia Kelly ("Mystica"), Felicitas Woll ("Igel"), Luca Hanni ("Shoebill")

== Episodes ==
=== Week 1 (1 April) ===
Performances on the first live episode
#	Stage name	Song	Identity	Result
1	Känguru	"Blurred Lines" by Robin Thicke feat. T.I. and Pharrell Williams	Jan Josef Liefers	OUT
2	Frotteefant	"Never Gonna Not Dance Again" by Pink	undisclosed	WIN
3	Schuhschnabel	"One Step Closer" by Linkin Park	undisclosed	WIN
4	Igel	"There's Nothing Holdin' Me Back" by Shawn Mendes	undisclosed	WIN
5	Toast	"Pump Up the Jam" by Technotronic / "I'm So Excited" by The Pointer Sisters	undisclosed	WIN
6	Seepferdchen	"Because of You" by Kelly Clarkson	undisclosed	RISK
7	Pilz	"In the Shadows" by The Rasmus	undisclosed	RISK
8	Waschbär	"Hey Ya!" by Outkast	undisclosed	WIN
9	Mystica	"Diamonds Are Forever" by Shirley Bassey	undisclosed	WIN

=== Week 2 (8 April) ===
Performances on the first live episode
#	Stage name	Song	Identity	Result
1	Igel	"About Damn Time" by Lizzo	undisclosed	RISK
2	Schuhschnabel	"With or Without You" by U2	undisclosed	WIN
3	Waschbär	"Pretty Fly (For a White Guy)" by The Offspring	Daniel Boschmann	OUT
4	Frotteefant	"Kiss Me" by Sixpence None the Richer	undisclosed	WIN
5	Pilz	"You Know I'm No Good" by Amy Winehouse	undisclosed	RISK
6	Toast	"Wake Me Up Before You Go-Go" by Wham! / "Frankreich Frankreich" by Bläck Fööss	undisclosed	WIN
7	Seepferdchen	"Clocks" by Coldplay	undisclosed	RISK
8	Mystica	"Paint It Black" by The Rolling Stones	undisclosed	WIN

=== Week 3 (15 April) ===
Performances on the third live episode
#	Stage name	Song		Identity	Result
1	Frotteefant	"Dancing Queen" by ABBA	"Easy On Me" by Adele	undisclosed	RISK
2	Schuhschnabel	"Gossip" by Måneskin	"Easy On Me" by Adele	undisclosed	WIN
3	Toast	"Scatman (Ski-Ba-Bop-Ba-Dop-Bop)" by Scatman John / "Be My Lover" by La Bouche / Somebody Dance With Me by DJ Bobo	"Moves Like Jagger / This Love" by Maroon 5	undisclosed	RISK
4	Pilz	"Industry Baby" by Lil Nas X	"Moves Like Jagger / This Love" by Maroon 5	Marianne Rosenberg	OUT
5	Seepferdchen	"Respect" by Aretha Franklin	"Moves Like Jagger / This Love" by Maroon 5	undisclosed	WIN
6	Igel	"Anti-Hero" by Taylor Swift	"Bad Romance" by Lady Gaga	undisclosed	RISK
7	Mystica	"Dark Horse" by Katy Perry	"Bad Romance" by Lady Gaga	undisclosed	WIN

=== Week 4 (22 April) ===
Performances on the fourth live episode
#	Stage name	Song		Identity	Result
1	Schuhschnabel	"Pray For Me" by The Weeknd feat. Kendrick Lamar	"Bad Habits" by Ed Sheeran feat. Bring Me the Horizon	undisclosed	WIN
2	Seepferdchen	"Jolene" by Dolly Parton	"Bad Habits" by Ed Sheeran feat. Bring Me the Horizon	Anna Loos	OUT
3	Igel	"Never Gonna Give You Up" by Rick Astley	"Girls Just Want to Have Fun" by Cyndi Lauper	undisclosed	WIN
4	Toast	"When I Need You" by Leo Sayer	"Girls Just Want to Have Fun" by Cyndi Lauper	undisclosed	RISK
5	Frotteefant	"Love Yourself" by Justin Bieber	"Where Is the Love?" by Black Eyed Peas	undisclosed	RISK
6	Mystica	"Elastic Heart" by Sia	"Where Is the Love?" by Black Eyed Peas	undisclosed	WIN

=== Week 5 (29 April) - Semi-final ===
Performances on the fifth live episode
#	Stage name	Song	Identity	Result
1	Toast	"Rock You Like a Hurricane" by Scorpions	undisclosed	RISK
2	Igel	"Chim Chim Cher-ee" by Dick Van Dyke	undisclosed	WIN
3	Mystica	"Maneater" by Nelly Furtado	undisclosed	RISK
4	Frotteefant	"Levitating" by Dua Lipa	undisclosed	RISK
5	Schuhschnabel	"Closer to the Edge" by Thirty Seconds To Mars	undisclosed	WIN
Sing-off details with (Skelett) Sarah Engels			Identity	Result
1	Toast	"Don't Be Cruel" by Elvis Presley / "Tutti Frutti" by Little Richard	Inka Bause	OUT
2	Mystica	"Stay" by Shakespears Sister	undisclosed	SAFE
3	Frotteefant	"Trick Me" by Kelis	undisclosed	SAFE

=== Week 6 (May 6) - Final ===
- Group number: "Shut Up and Dance" by Walk the Moon

==== Round One ====
Performances on the final live episode – Round one
#	Stage name	Song	Identity	Result
1	Igel	"Flowers" by Miley Cyrus	undisclosed	SAFE
2	Mystica	"Hysteria" by Muse	undisclosed	SAFE
3	Frotteefant	"No Diggity" by Blackstreet & Dr. Dre	Melissa Khalaj	OUT
4	Schuhschnabel	"Trustfall" by P!nk	undisclosed	SAFE

==== Round Two ====
Performances on the final live episode – round two
#	Stage name	Song with (Maulwurf) Daniel Donskoy	Identity	Result
1	Igel	"Uninvited" by Alanis Morissette	undisclosed	SAFE
2	Mystica	"Stronger" by Britney Spears	Patricia Kelly	THIRD
3	Schuhschnabel	"Losing My Religion" by R.E.M.	undisclosed	SAFE

==== Round Three ====
Performances on the final live episode – round three
#	Stage name	Song	Identity	Result
1	Igel	"Anti-Hero" by Taylor Swift	Felicitas Woll	RUNNER-UP
2	Schuhschnabel	"Gossip" by Måneskin	Luca Hänni	WINNER

== Reception ==
=== Ratings ===
Episode	Original airdate	Timeslot	Viewers (in millions)		Share (in %)		Source
Episode	Original airdate	Timeslot	Household	Adults 14-49	Household	Adults 14-49	Source
1	1 April 2023	Saturday 8:15 pm	2.14	0.96	8.8	17.9	
2	8 April 2023	Saturday 8:15 pm	1.97	0.87	8.4	16.8	
3	15 April 2023	Saturday 8:15 pm	2.08	0.94	8.6	17.2	
4	22 April 2023	Saturday 8:15 pm	2.02	0.92	8.9	18.7	
5	29 April 2023	Saturday 8:15 pm	1.81	0.82	8.0	16.5	
6	6 May 2023	Saturday 8:15 pm	2.00	0.78	9.4	16.8	
Average			2.00	0.88	8.7	17.3	
