= Ehab Tawfik =

Egyptian singer and actor (born 1966)

- إيهاب توفيق
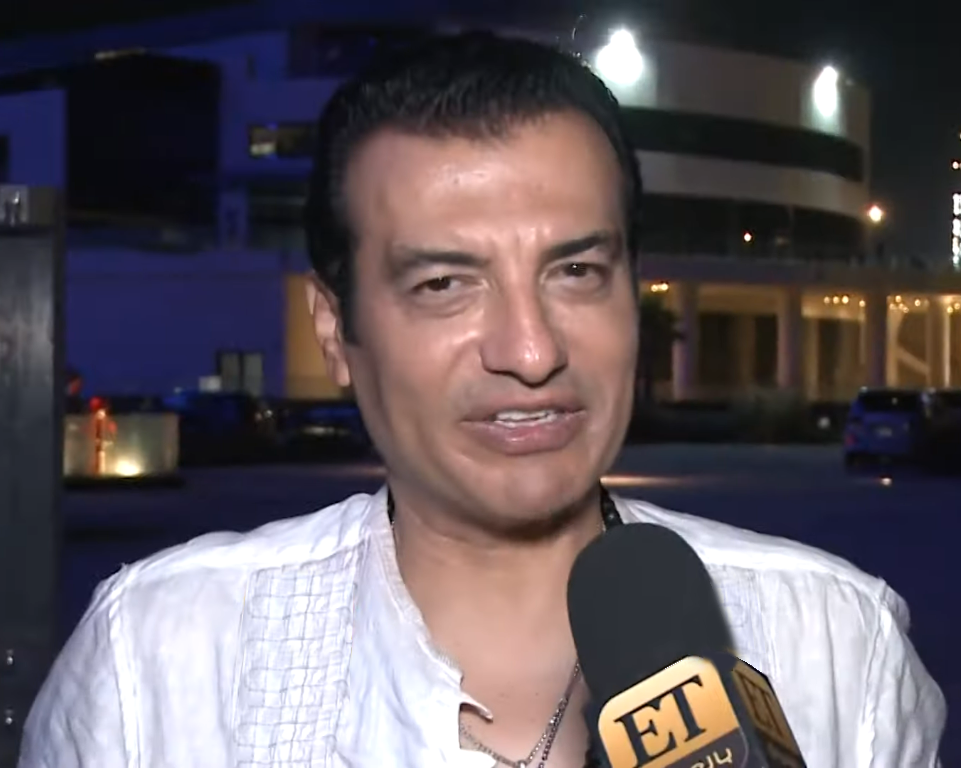
- Born: 7 January 1966 (age 60); Cairo, Egypt
- Occupations: Composer, singer, actor
- Years active: 1989–present
- Musical career
- Genre: Arabic
- Labels: Sonar, Pigeon Records, High Quality, Rotana, Alam El Phan, Delika, Ehab Tawfik Productions

Ehab Tawfik (born 7 January 1966; Arabic: إيهاب توفيق) is an Egyptian singer and actor. He performs mostly in the shababi genre of Egyptian popular music. He has also recorded songs in the watani (nationalistic) tradition, among them "Set saʿat" ('Six Hours'), released as an overtly pro-military video shortly after the military coup d'état which removed Mohamed Morsi from power in 2013.

== Personal life ==
Tawfik married Nada Rizk after the age of 40, with whom he has a twin boys, Ahmed and Mahmoud in 2008, and a girl, Noreen in 2014.

His father, Ahmad, died from a blaze in his villa in Nasr City in January 2020, six years after Ehab's mother died.

== Hits ==
His hit songs include "Habibi" ("My Love"), "Sahrany" ("She Enchanted Me"), "Tetraga Feya" ("Begging Me"), "Hobak Alemni" ("Your Love Taught Me"), and Allah Alek Ya Sidi have all been popular in Arabic speaking countries.

His recent hits in 2023 are "Ghaltan" ("It is my fault"), and "Leeky Andy" ("I owe you").

"Ghaltan" talks about how he loved someone and then he left them. Now he is regretting this decision and he wishes that he never left his lover. "Leeky Andy" talks about how he will treat his lover and how much love he will show her.
