= Loi (singer) =

German singer (born 2002)

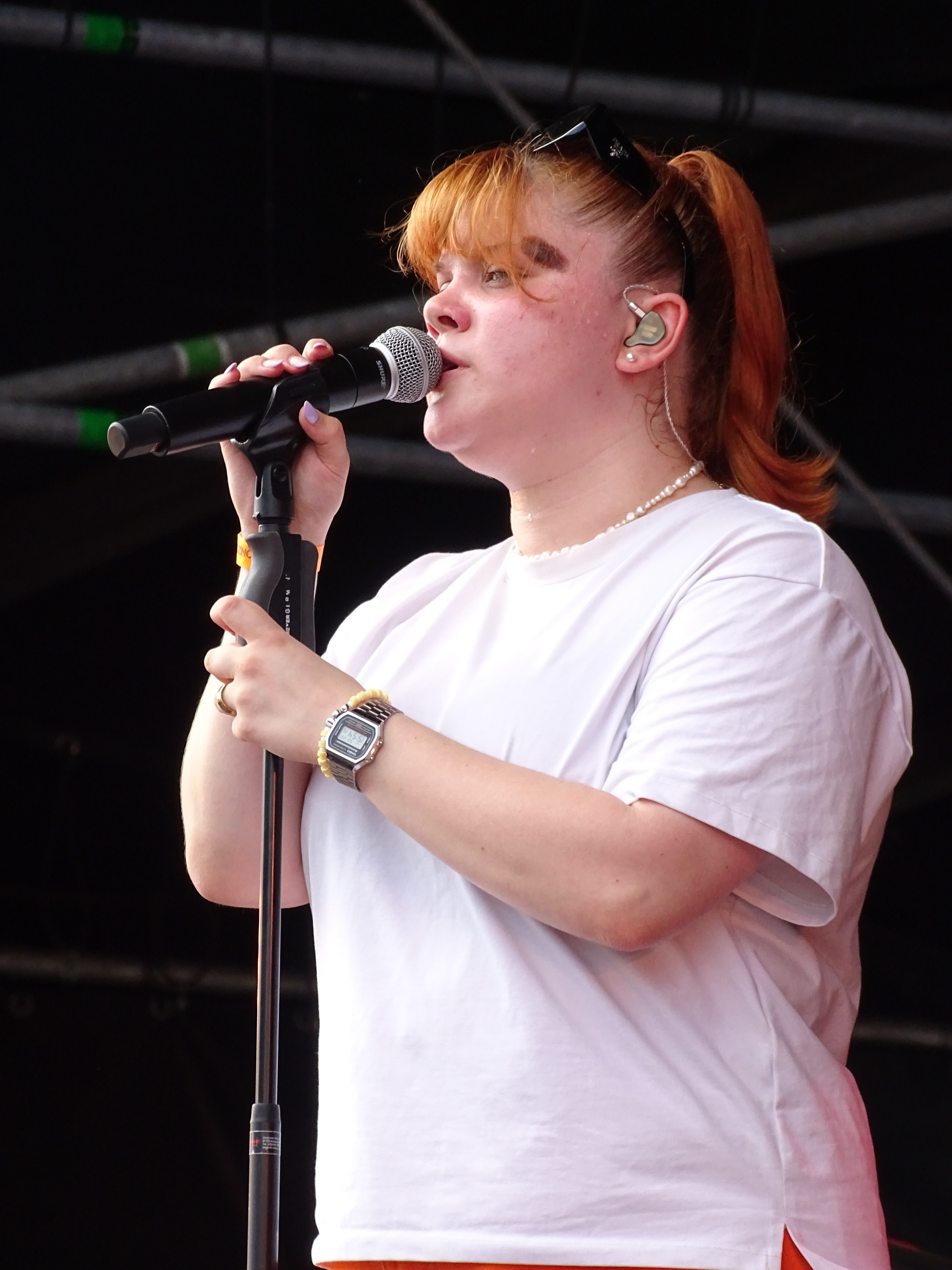
- Loi in 2023
- Born: Leonie Greiner; 3 July 2002 (age 24); Mannheim, Germany
- Occupations: Singer; songwriter
- Years active: 2017–present
- Musical career
- Genre: Pop
- Instruments: Vocals; guitar; piano
- Label: Volksmusic

Leonie Greiner (born 3 July 2002), known professionally as Loi, is a German singer. In 2017, she competed on the German reality talent show The Voice Kids where she reached the finale. Loi's 2022 single "Gold" received gold certifications in France and Poland, in addition to peaking at number two in the latter.

== Life and career ==
Leonie Greiner was born on 3 July 2002 in Mannheim, Germany. When she was four, she was part of her school's choir. Her stage name, which is a different spelling of lion, originates from her childhood nickname "Leonie Lionheart". Loi plays the guitar and the piano and said that British singer-songwriter Adele "had a big influence on [her] during [her] childhood". In 2017, at 14, she took part on the fifth season of the German reality talent show The Voice Kids, where she made it to the finale. Prior to her appearance on The Voice Kids, she took part in the German school competition Starke Schule with a song she wrote herself, finishing second nationwide. Loi releases music through her record label Volksmusic. In 2021, she signed a distribution deal with Warner Music and began studies at the Popakademie Baden-Württemberg. Loi's first single, "I Follow", was released in April 2021.

Her 2022 single "Gold" reached number two in Poland and received a gold certification from the Polish Society of the Phonographic Industry. It also peaked at number twelve in Slovakia and within the top forty in Austria and Germany. In France, the single reached number 101 on the French singles chart, while its French version featuring singer Robin was certified gold. During the summer of the same year, Loi was a supporting for fellow singer Zoe Wees's European tour. On 9 June 2023, she was the opening act for singer Sarah Connor at music festival Loreley. Loi embarked on her first concert tour titled the I Follow Tour in the autumn, which finished on 1 November. At the music award 1LIVE Krone, she received a nomination for Best Newcomer Act, while "Gold" was nominated for Best Song. In 2024, Loi took part on the eleventh season of the German reality singing competition television series The Masked Singer and won.

== Discography ==
=== Singles ===
List of singles showing years, peak chart positions, and certifications
Title	Year	Peak chart positions							Certifications	Album
Title	Year	GER	AUT	CIS	FRA	POL	SVK	SWI	Certifications	Album
"I Follow"	2021	—	—	—	—	—	—	—		Non-album singles
"Melody"	2021	—	—	—	—	—	—	—		Non-album singles
"Blinding Lights"	2021	—	—	—	—	—	—	—		Non-album singles
"Pick Up!"	2022	—	—	—	—	—	—	—		Non-album singles
"Gold"	2022	35	33	81	101	2	12	98	SNEP: Gold; ZPAV: Gold	Non-album singles
"Snowman"	2022	—	—	—	—	—	—	—		Non-album singles
"News"	2023	—	—	—	—	—	—	—		Non-album singles
"Am I Enough"	2023	— (Note: "Am I Enough" did not enter the Official German Singles Chart, but peaked at number 48 on the Germany Download Singles chart.)	—	—	—	—	18	—		Non-album singles
"The Way I Want It"	2024	—	—	—	—	—	—	—		Non-album singles
"—" denotes a single that did not chart or was not released in that territory.
