= The Masked Singer (German TV series) season 11 =

The Masked Singer
- Season 11
- Starring: Palina Rojinski; Rick Kavanian; Various guests
- Hosted by: Matthias Opdenhövel
- No. of contestants: 10
- Winner: Loi as "Panda"
- Runner-up: Joris as "Pirat"
- No. of episodes: 6

Release
- Original network: ProSieben
- Original release: 22 November – 21 December 2024

Season chronology
- ← Previous; Season 10 Next → Season 12

The eleventh season of the German singing competition The Masked Singer premiered on 22 November 2024 on ProSieben.

== Panelists and host ==
Season 11 main panelists and host

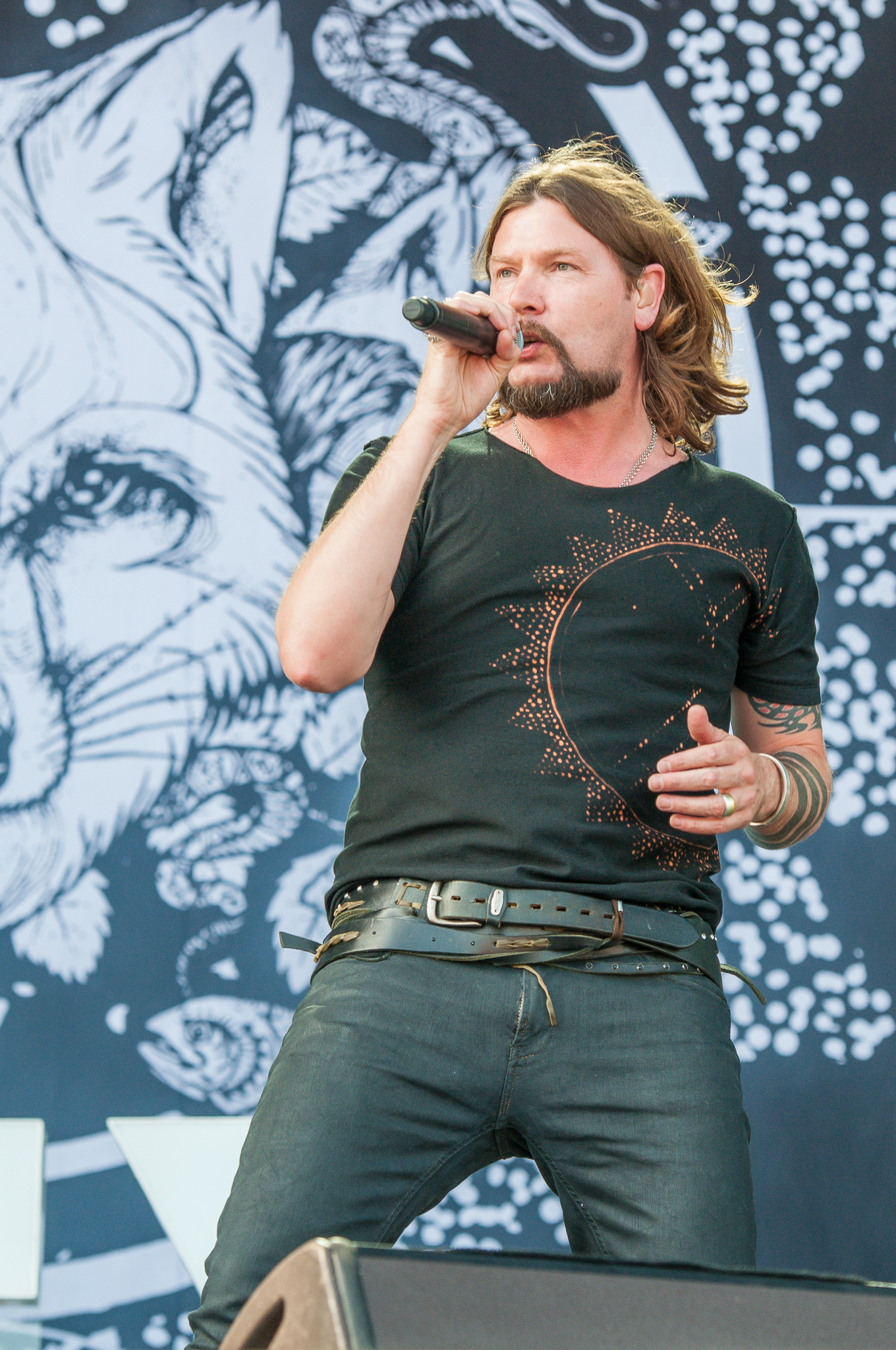
Rea Garvey

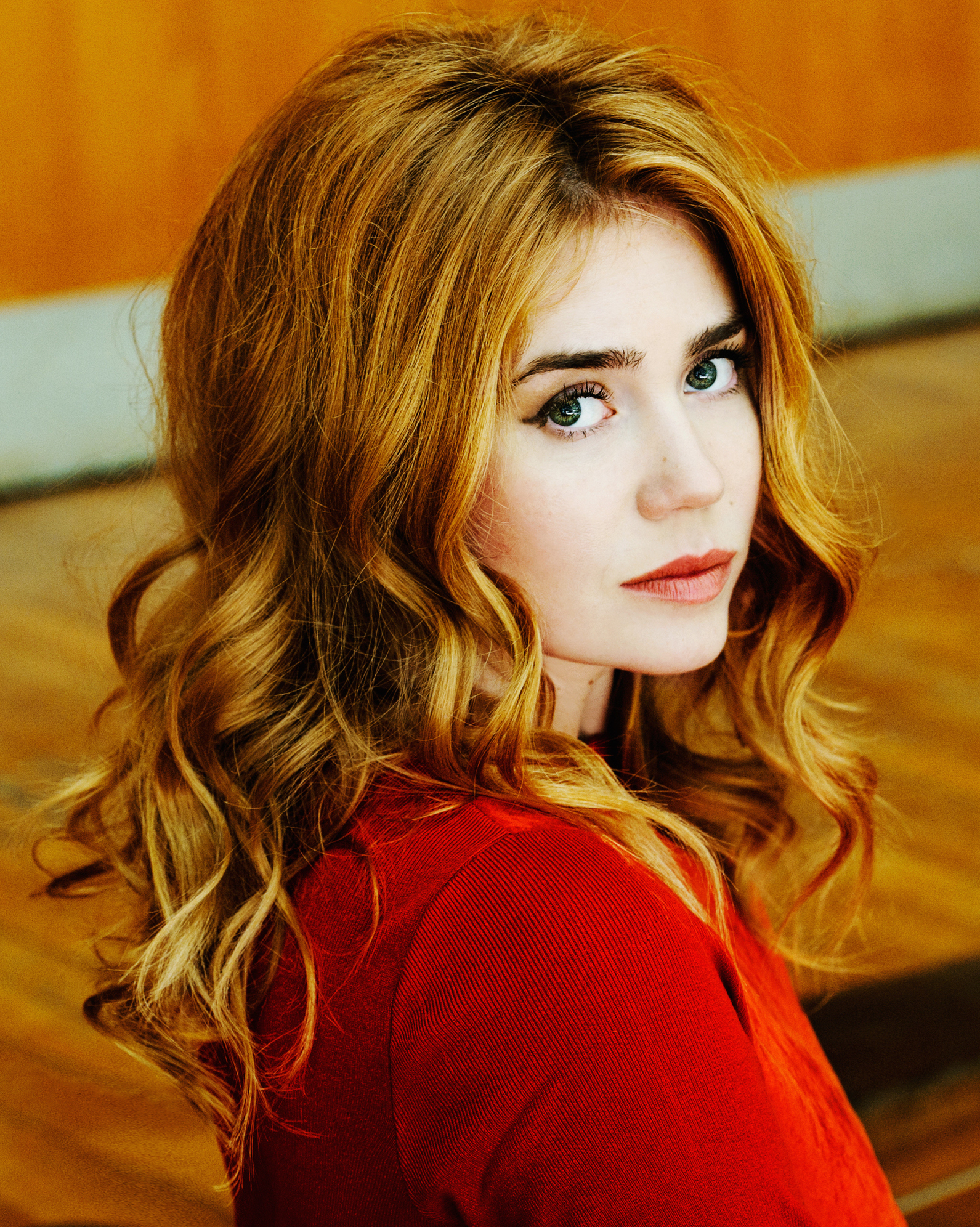
Palina Rojinski

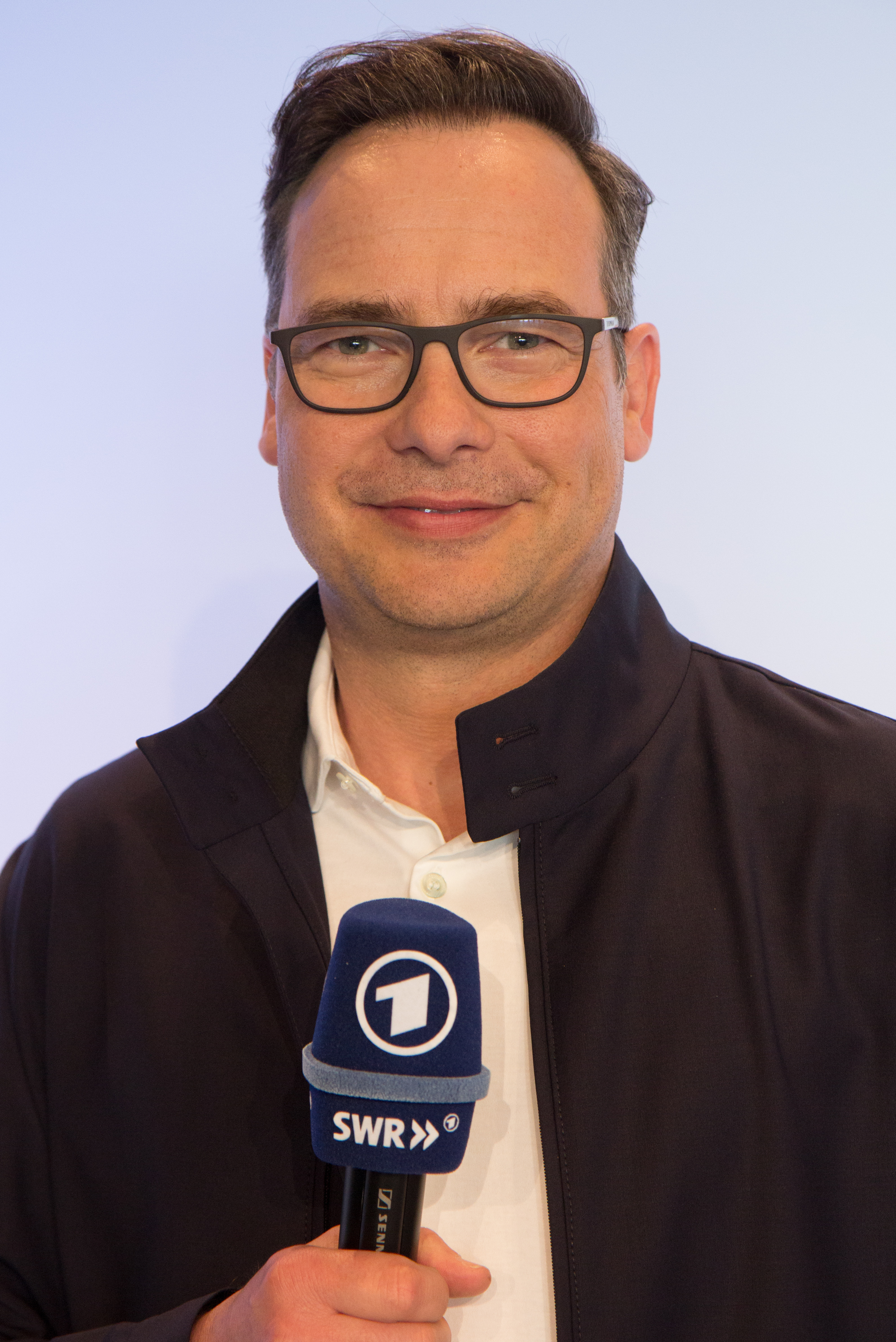
Matthias Opdenhövel

Rea Garvey returned for his sixth season, and Palina Rojinski returned for her second season. Matthias Opdenhövel returned for his eleventh season as host.

=== Guest panelists ===
Season 11 guest panelists

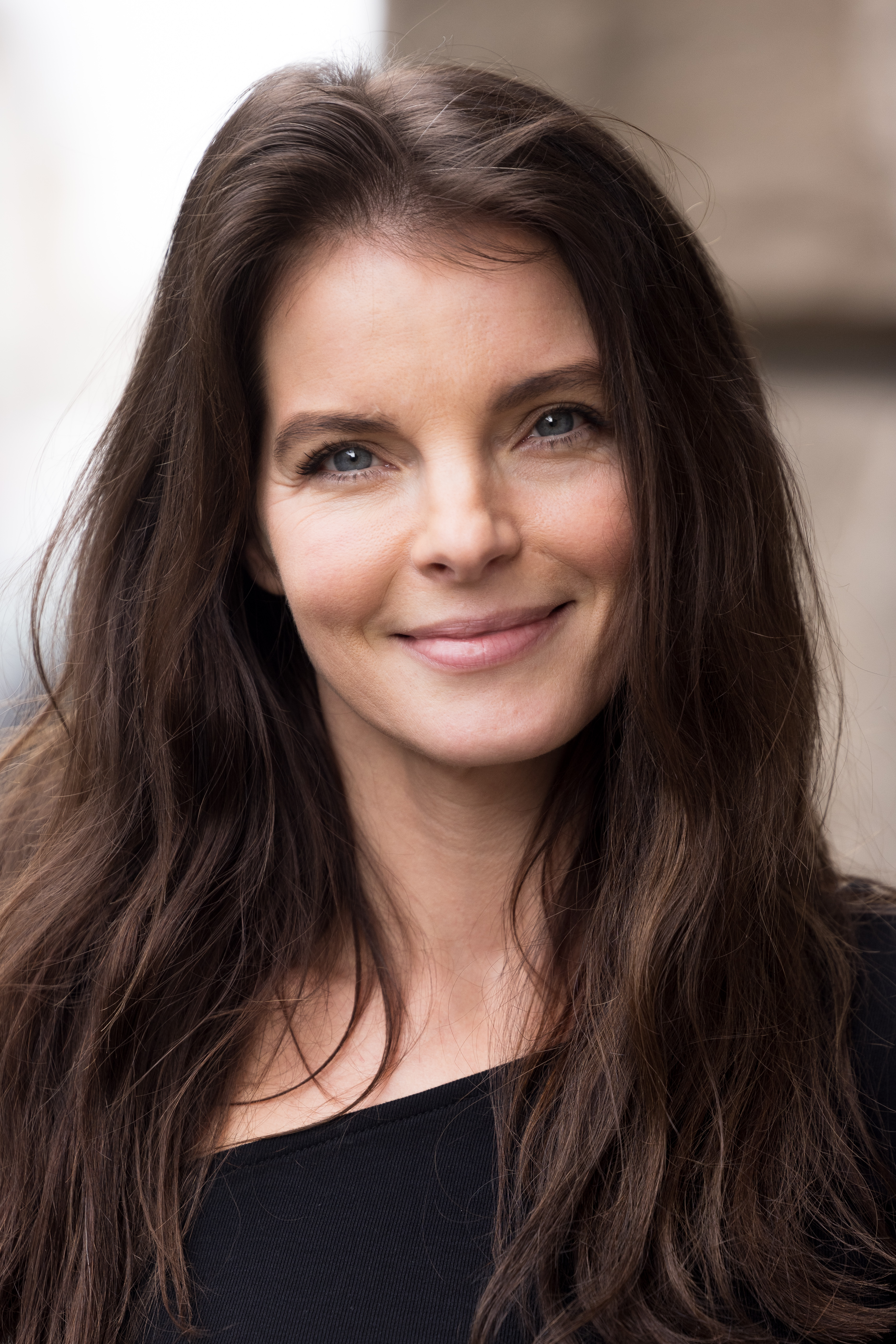
Yvonne Catterfeld (episode 1)

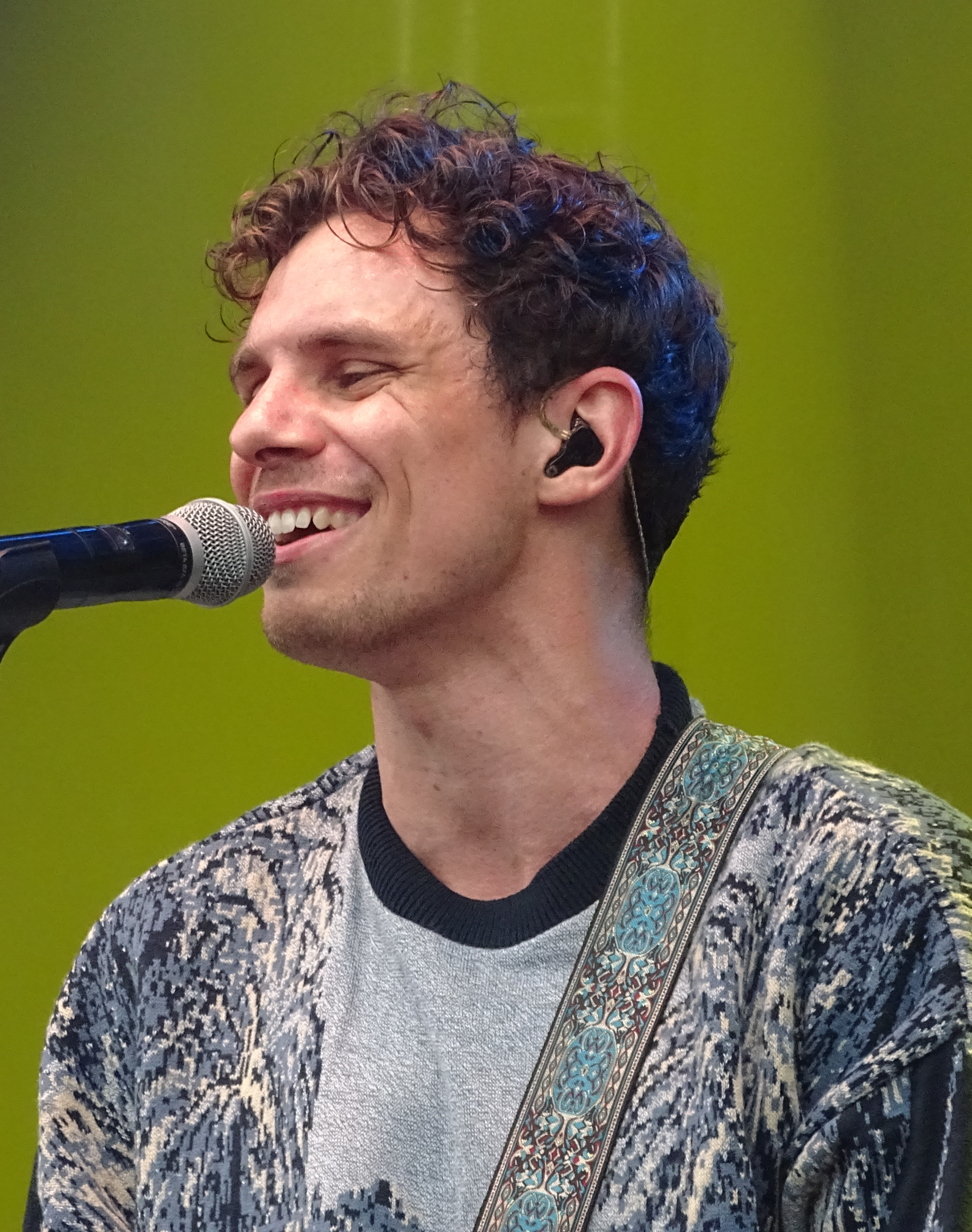
Kamrad (episode 1)

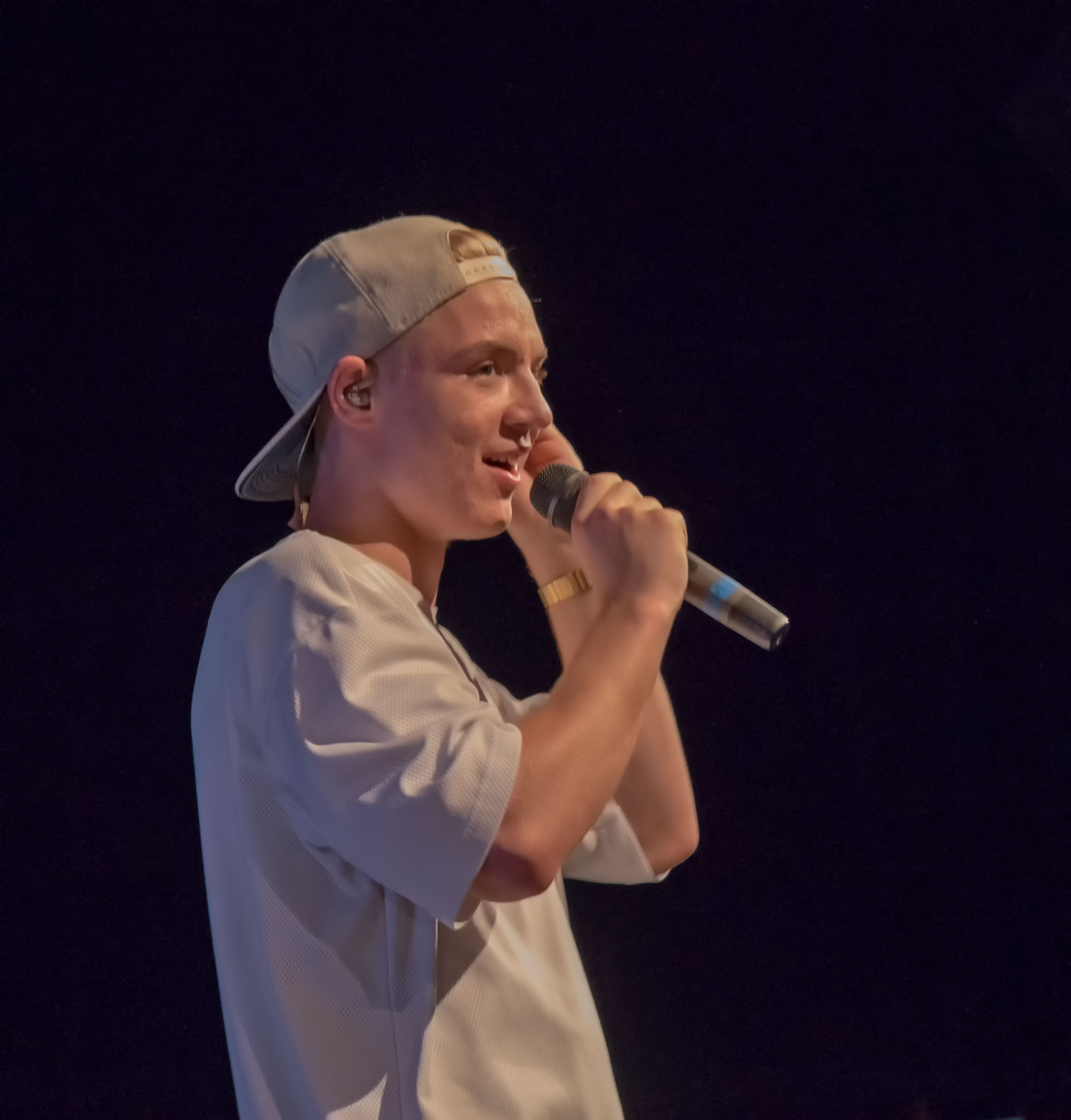
Heiko Lochmann (episode 2)

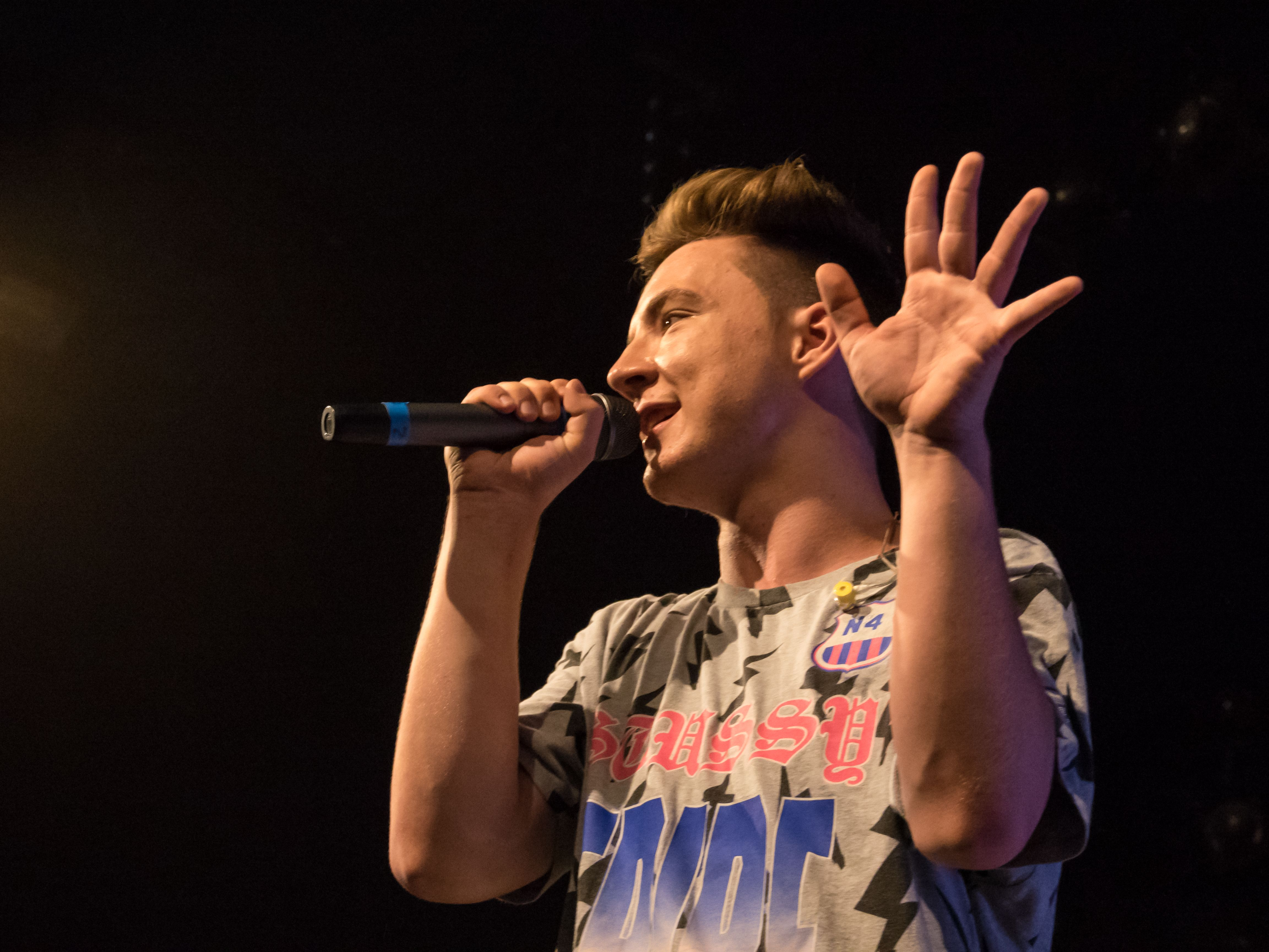
Roman Lochmann (episode 2)

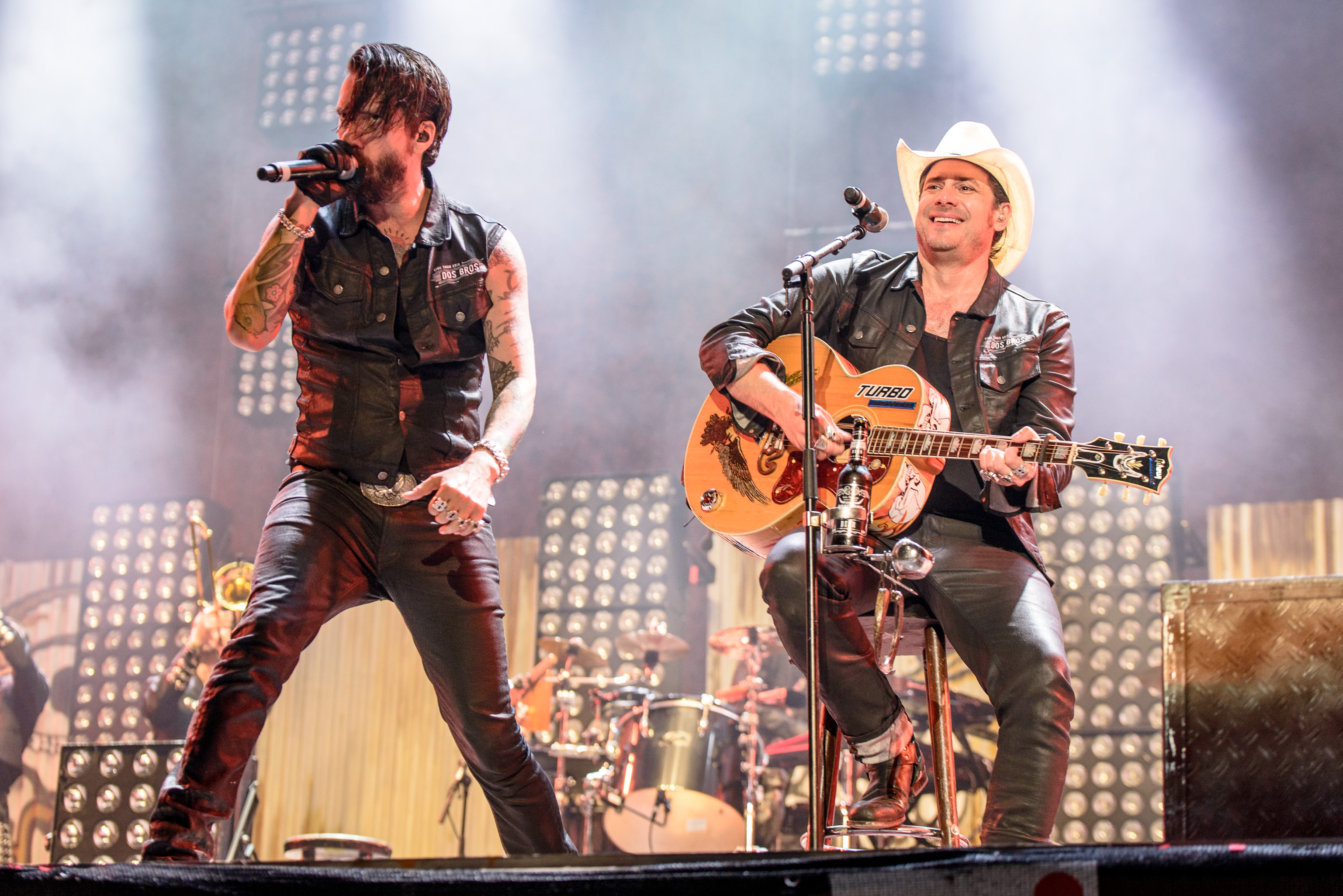
Alec Völkel and Sascha Vollmar (episode 3)

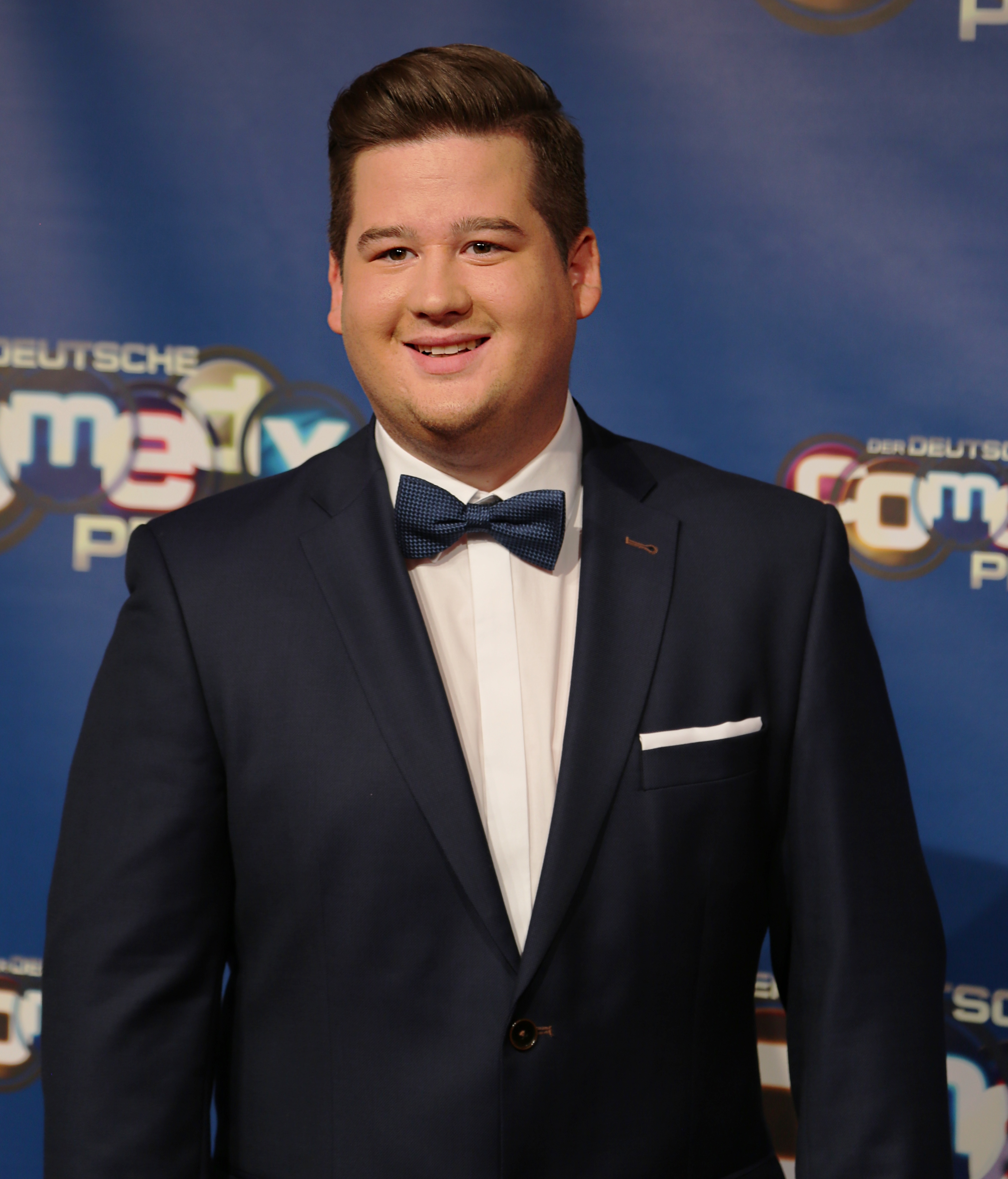
Chris Tall (episode 4)

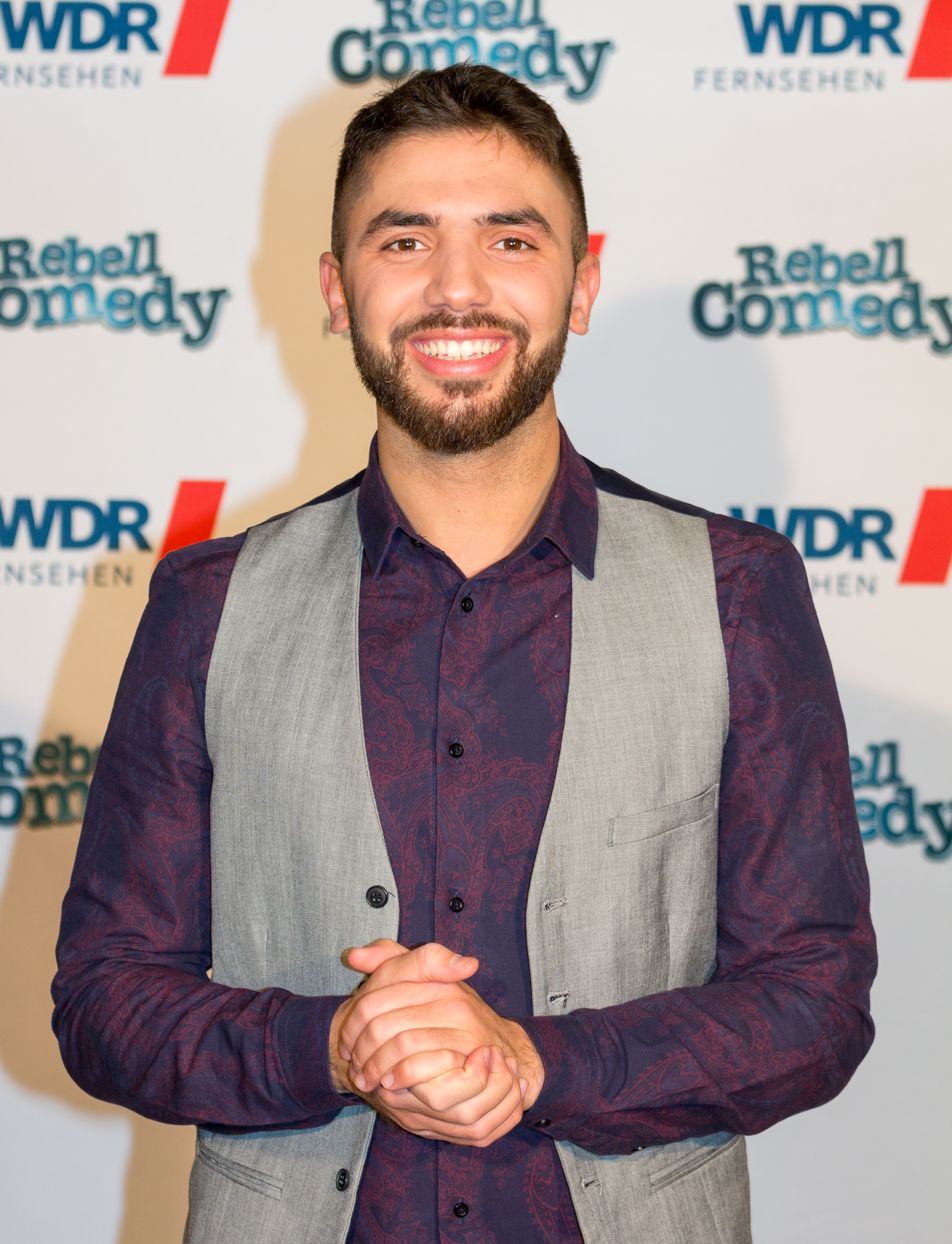
Khalid Bounouar (episode 4)

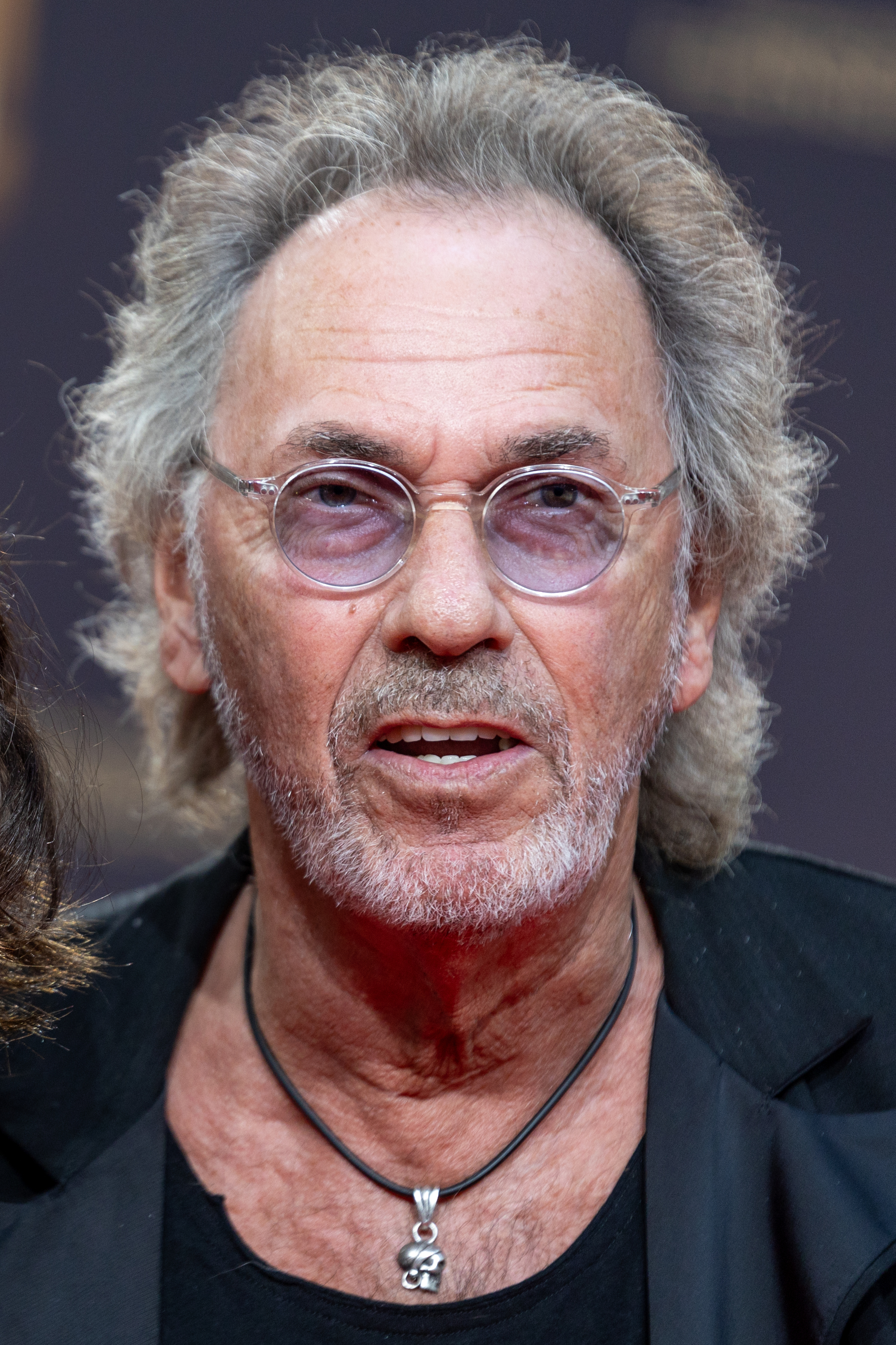
Hugo Egon Balder (episode 5)

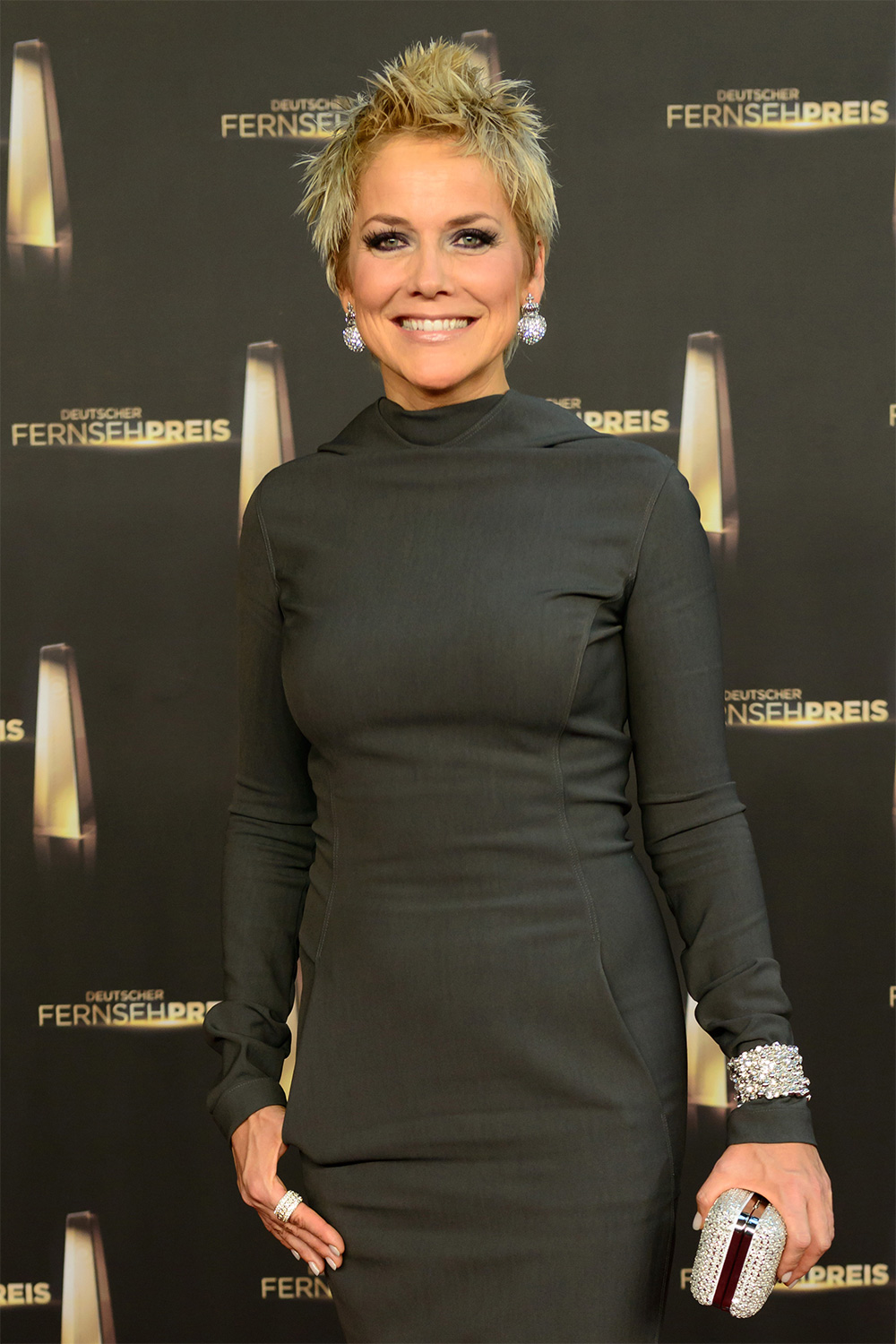
Inka Bause (episode 5)

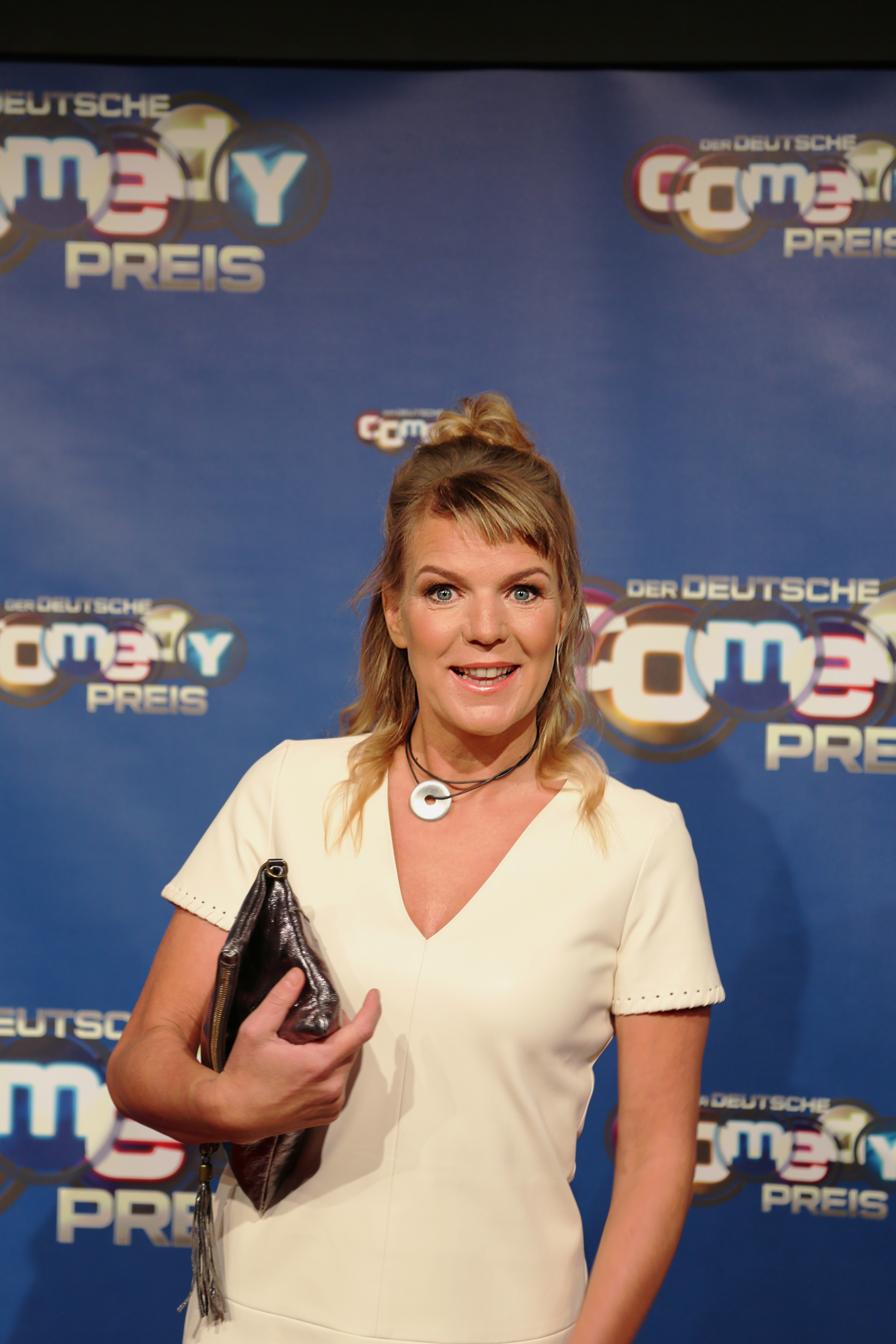
Mirja Boes(episode 6)

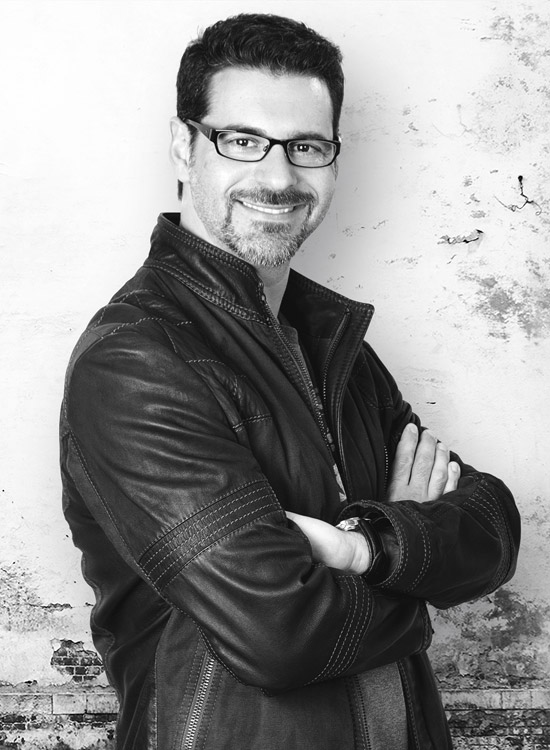
Rick Kavanian(episode 6)

Various guest panelists appeared as the third and fourth judges in the judging panel for one episode. These guest panelists included:

Episode	Panelist		Guest Panelists	
1	Rea Garvey	Palina Rojinski	Yvonne Catterfeld	Kamrad
2	Rea Garvey	Palina Rojinski	Heiko Lochmann	Roman Lochmann
3	Rea Garvey	Palina Rojinski	Alec Völkel	Sascha Vollmar
4	Rea Garvey	Palina Rojinski	Chris Tall	Khalid Bounouar
5	Rea Garvey	Palina Rojinski	Hugo Egon Balder	Inka Bause
6	Rea Garvey	Palina Rojinski	Mirja Boes	Rick Kavanian

== Contestants ==
The season features 10 contestants.

Results
Stage name	Celebrity	Notability	Live Episodes							
Stage name	Celebrity	Notability	1	2	3	4	5	6		
Stage name	Celebrity	Notability	1	2	3	4	5	A	B	C
Panda	Loi	Singer		WIN	WIN	WIN	WIN	SAFE	SAFE	WINNER
Pirat "Pirate"	Joris	Singer		WIN	WIN	WIN	RISK	SAFE	SAFE	RUNNER-UP
Qualle "Jellyfish"	Mandy Capristo	Singer	WIN		WIN	WIN	WIN	SAFE	THIRD	
Willi W.	Eko Fresh	Rapper	RISK		RISK	RISK	RISK	OUT		
Lokomotive "Locomotive"	Mimi Fiedler	Actress	WIN		RISK	WIN	OUT			
Feuersalamander "Fire Salamander"	Jessica Schwarz	Actress		RISK	WIN	RISK	OUT			
Schneemann "Snowman"	Lou Bega	Singer		WIN	RISK	OUT				
Lady Ananas "Lady Pineapple"	Maren Kroymann	Actress/Singer	WIN		OUT					
Lauch "Leek"	Madita van Hülsen	TV presenter		OUT						
Nashorn "Rhino"	Pascal Hens	Former handball player	OUT							

The masked singer won their face-off and remained in the competition.
The masked singer lost their face-off and was in the bottom four/three/two, but was not eliminated.
The masked singer was safe from elimination.
The masked singer was eliminated from the competition and unmasked upon their elimination.
The masked singer did not perform.
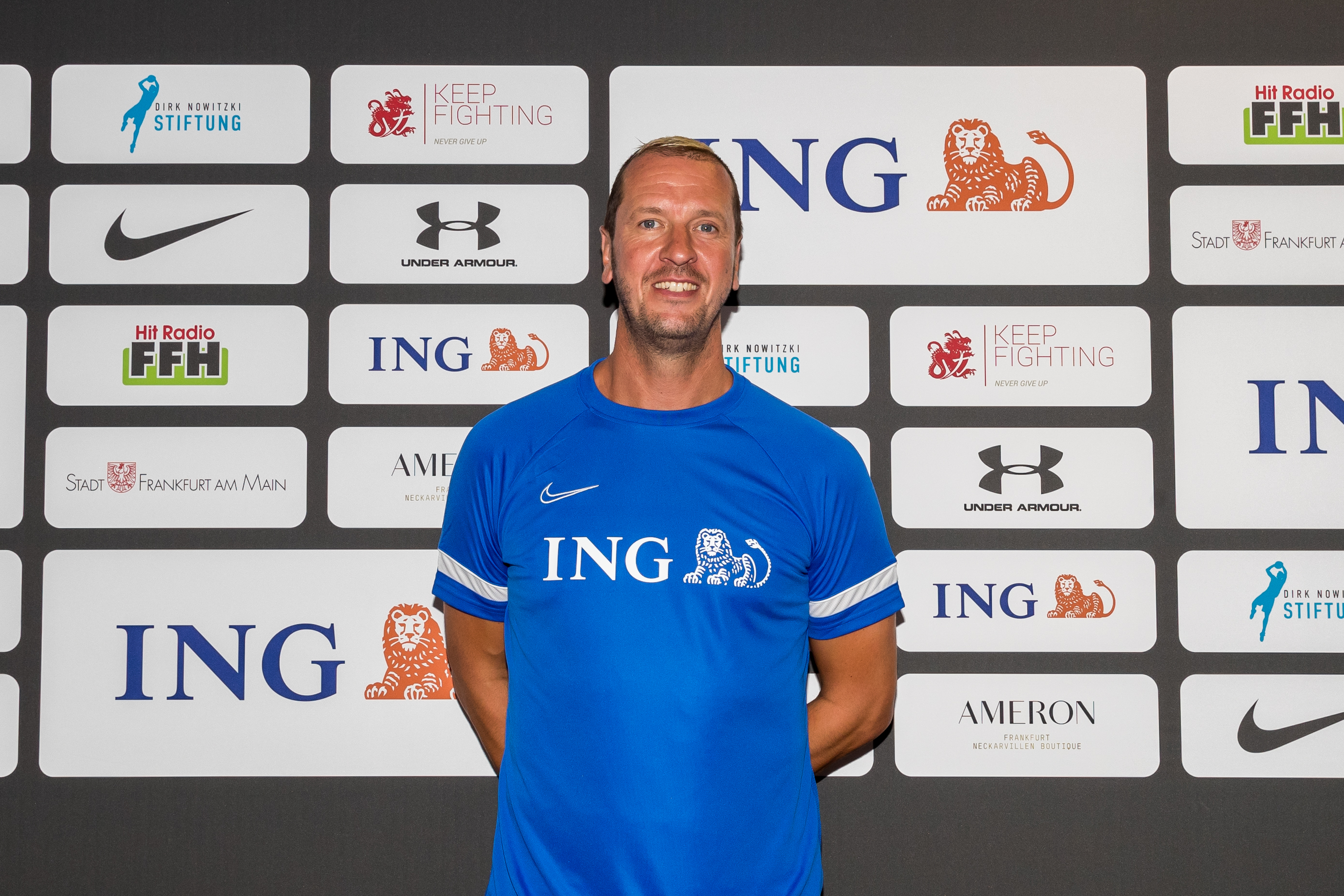
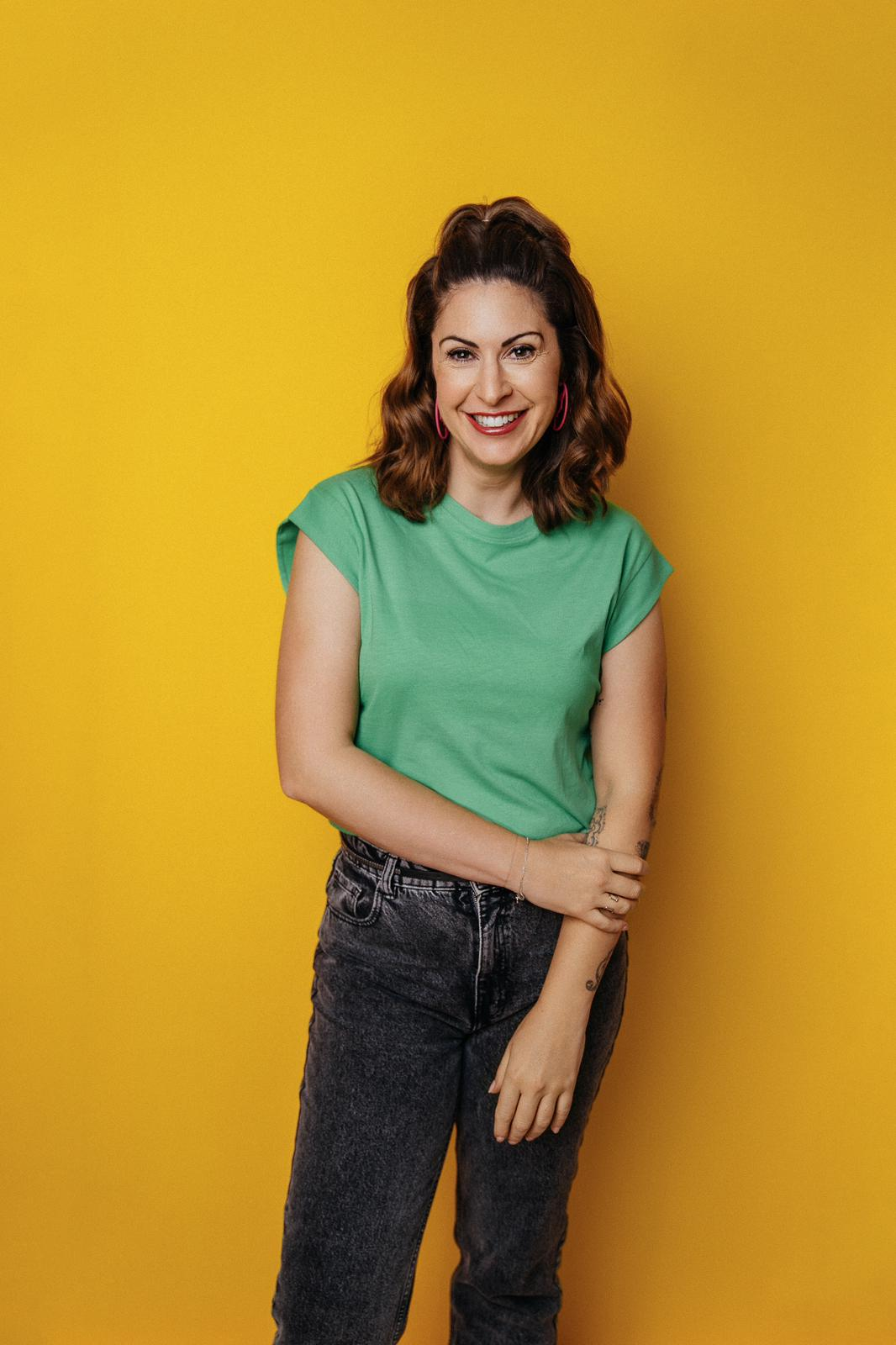
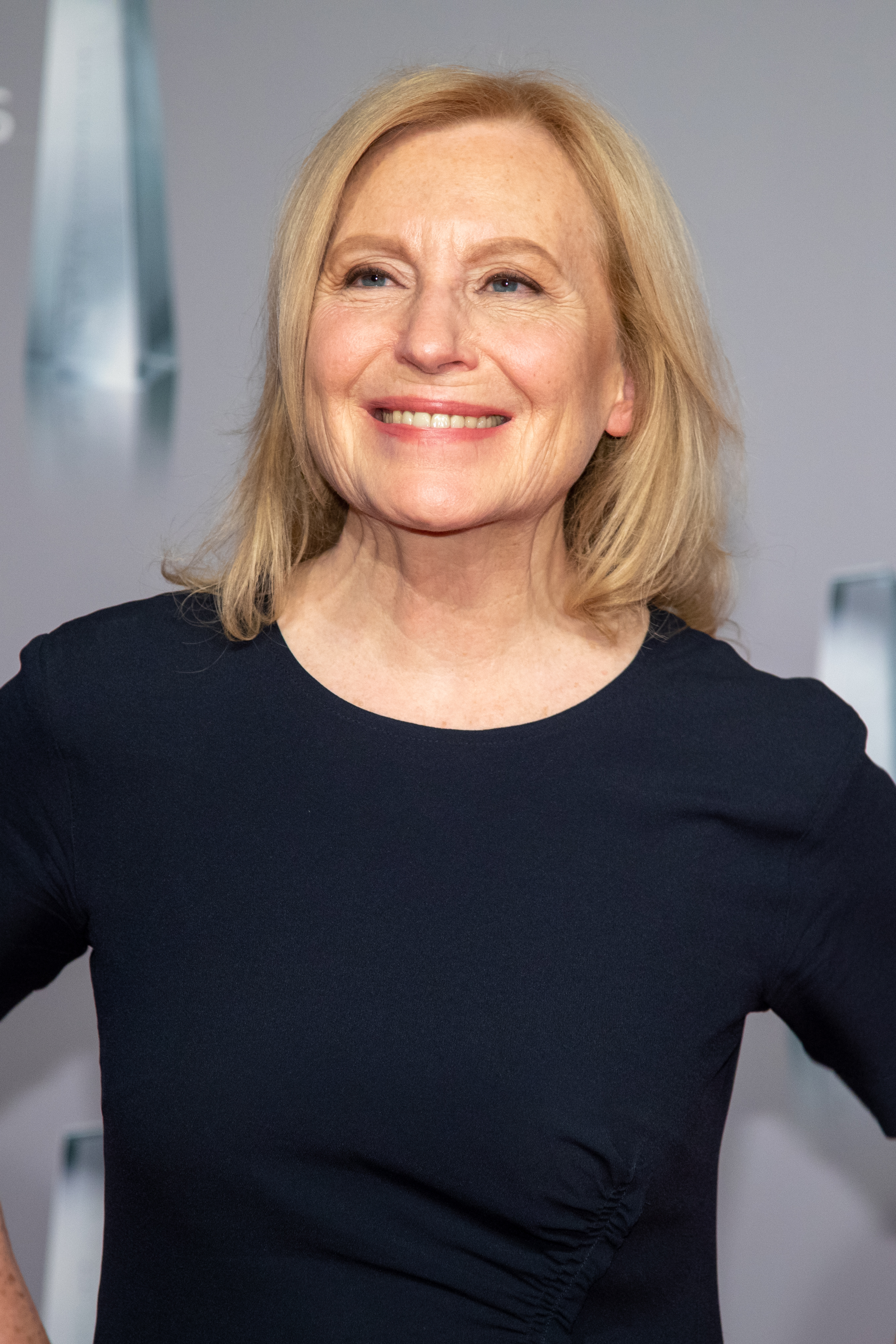
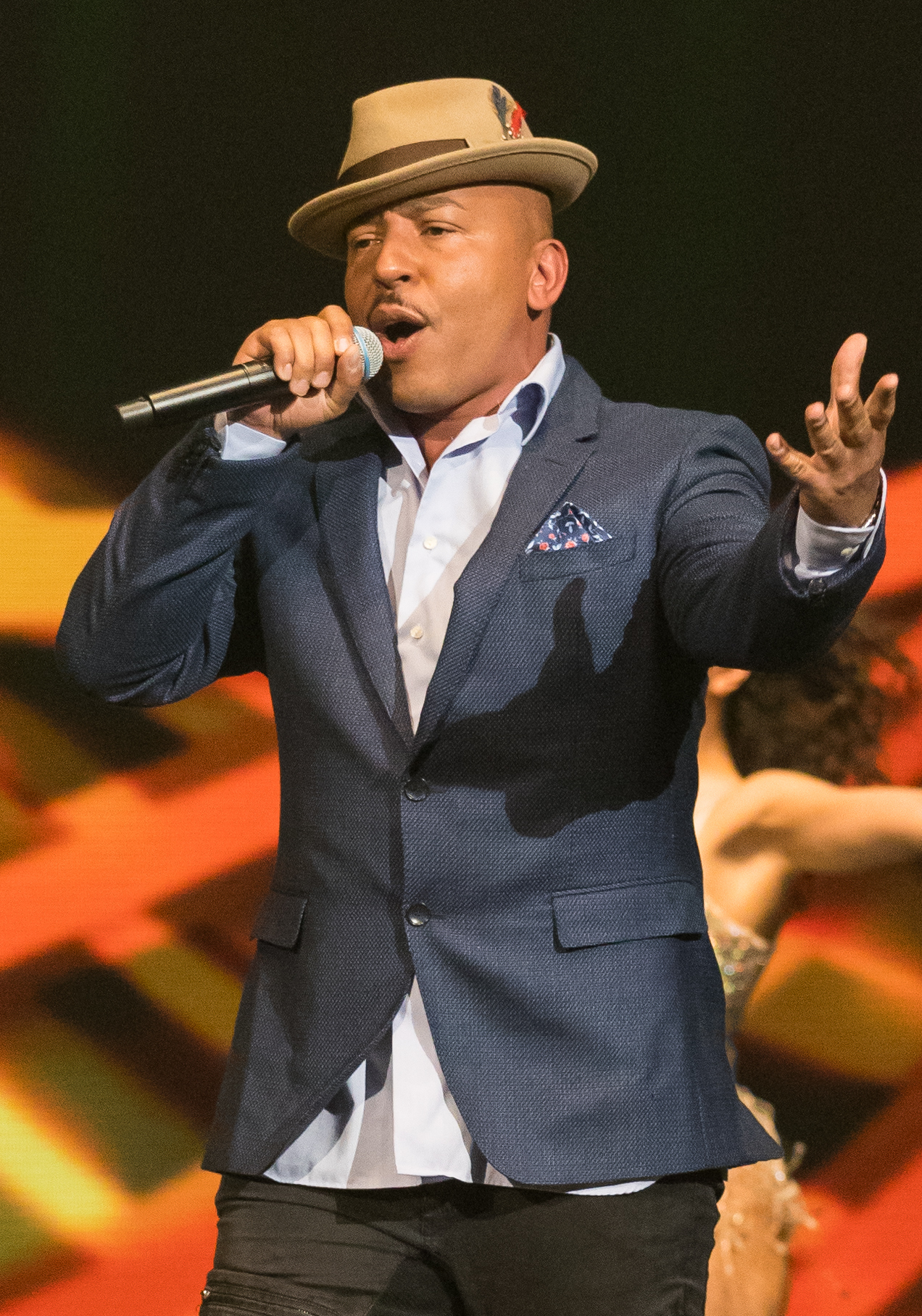
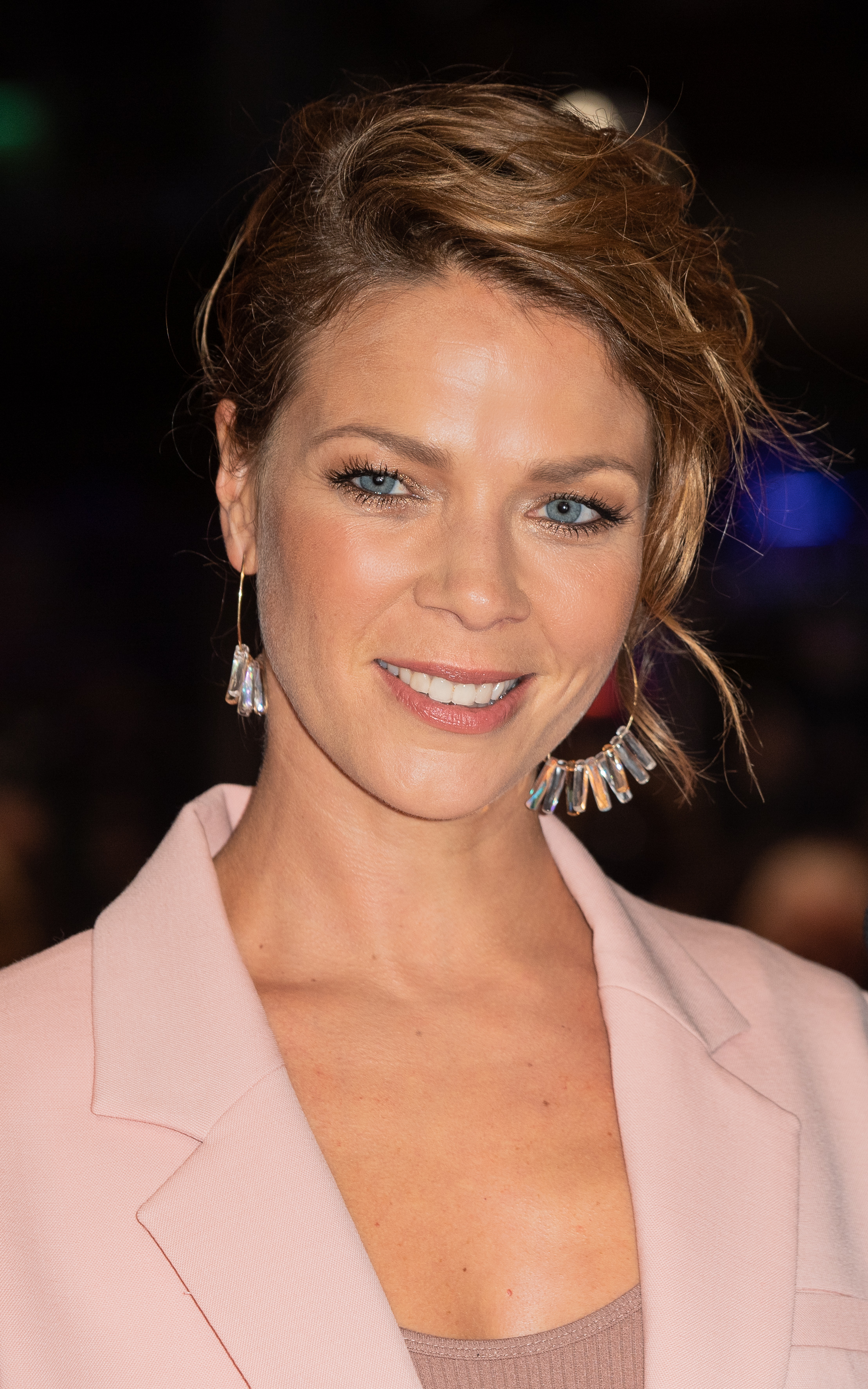
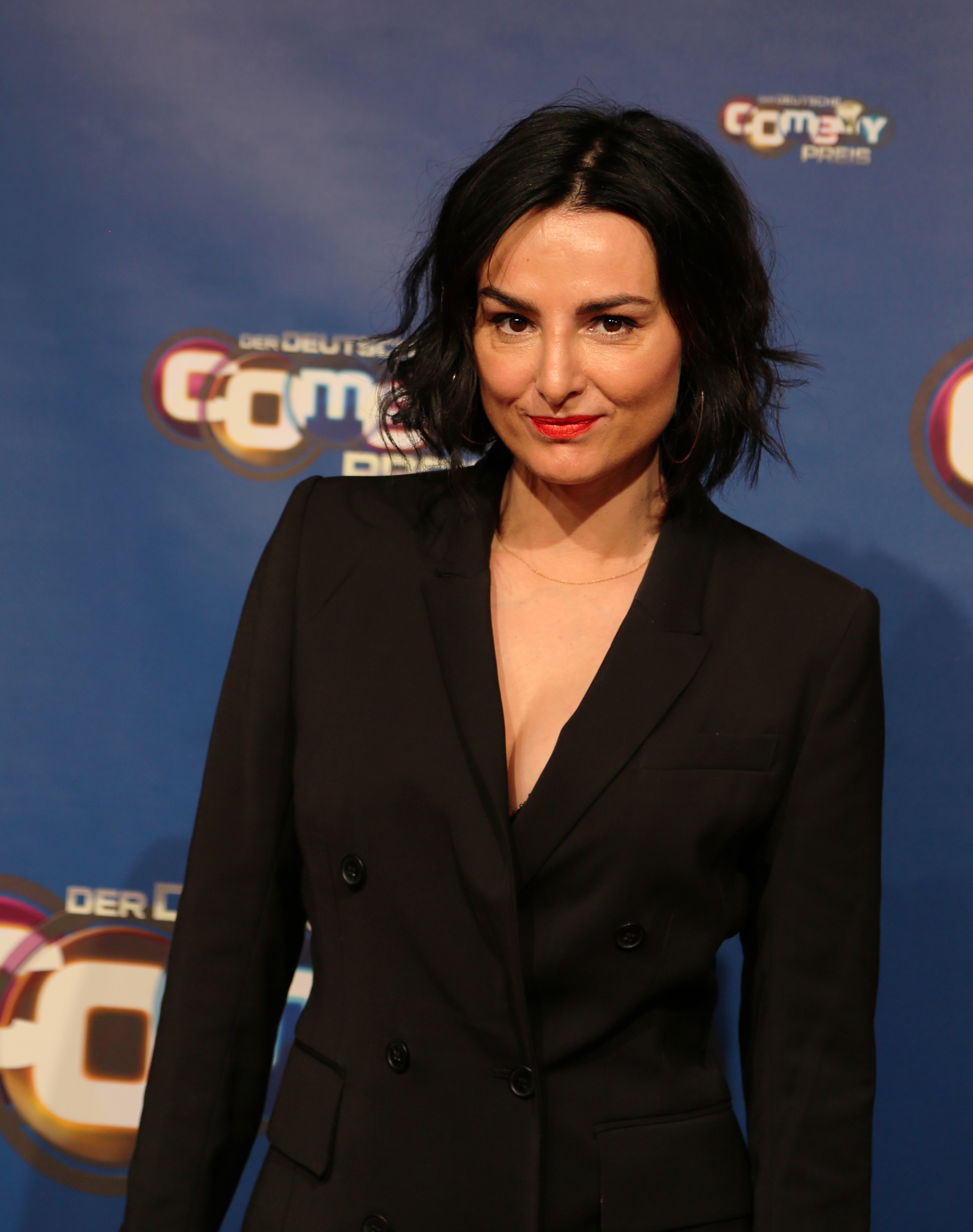
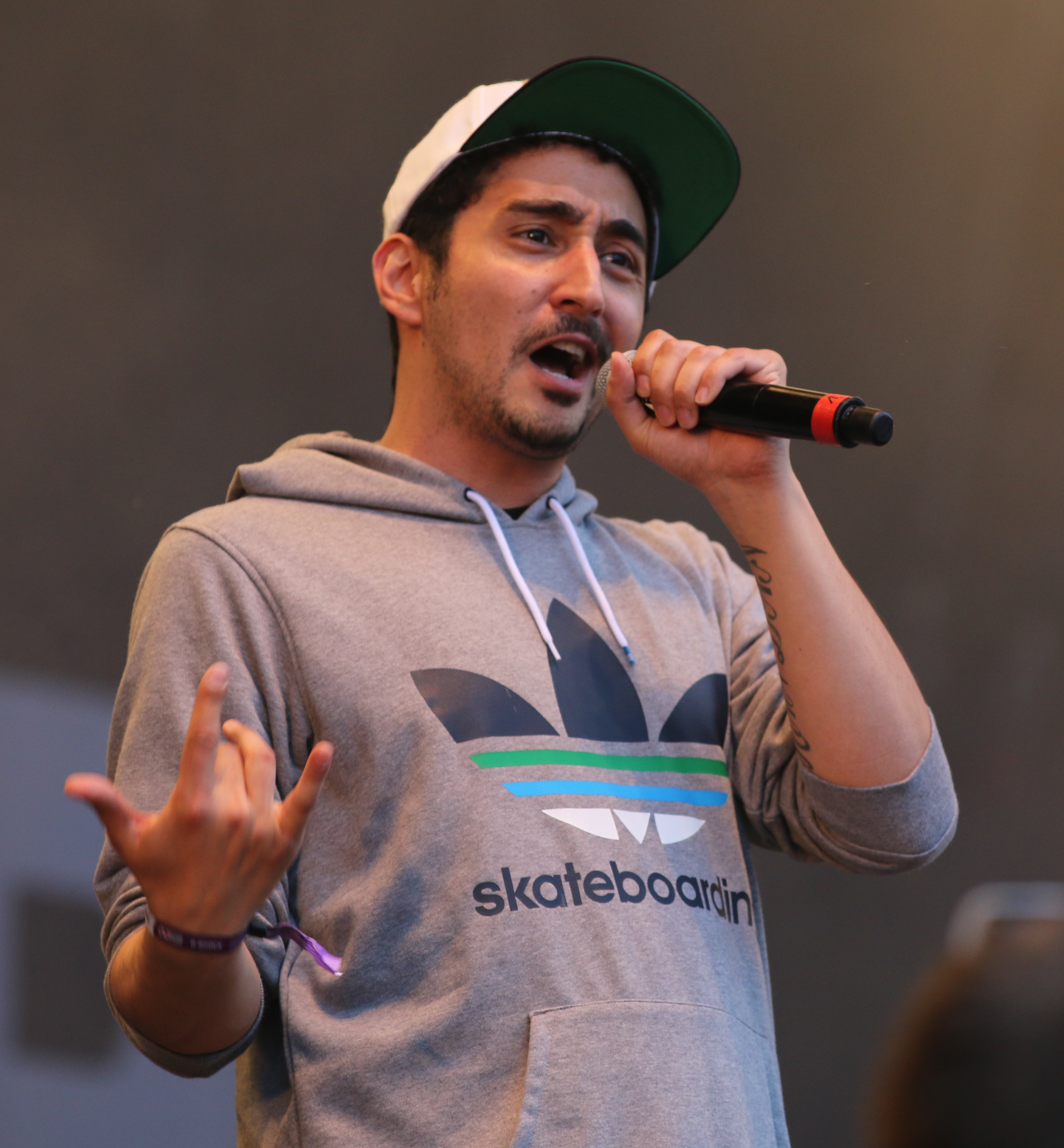
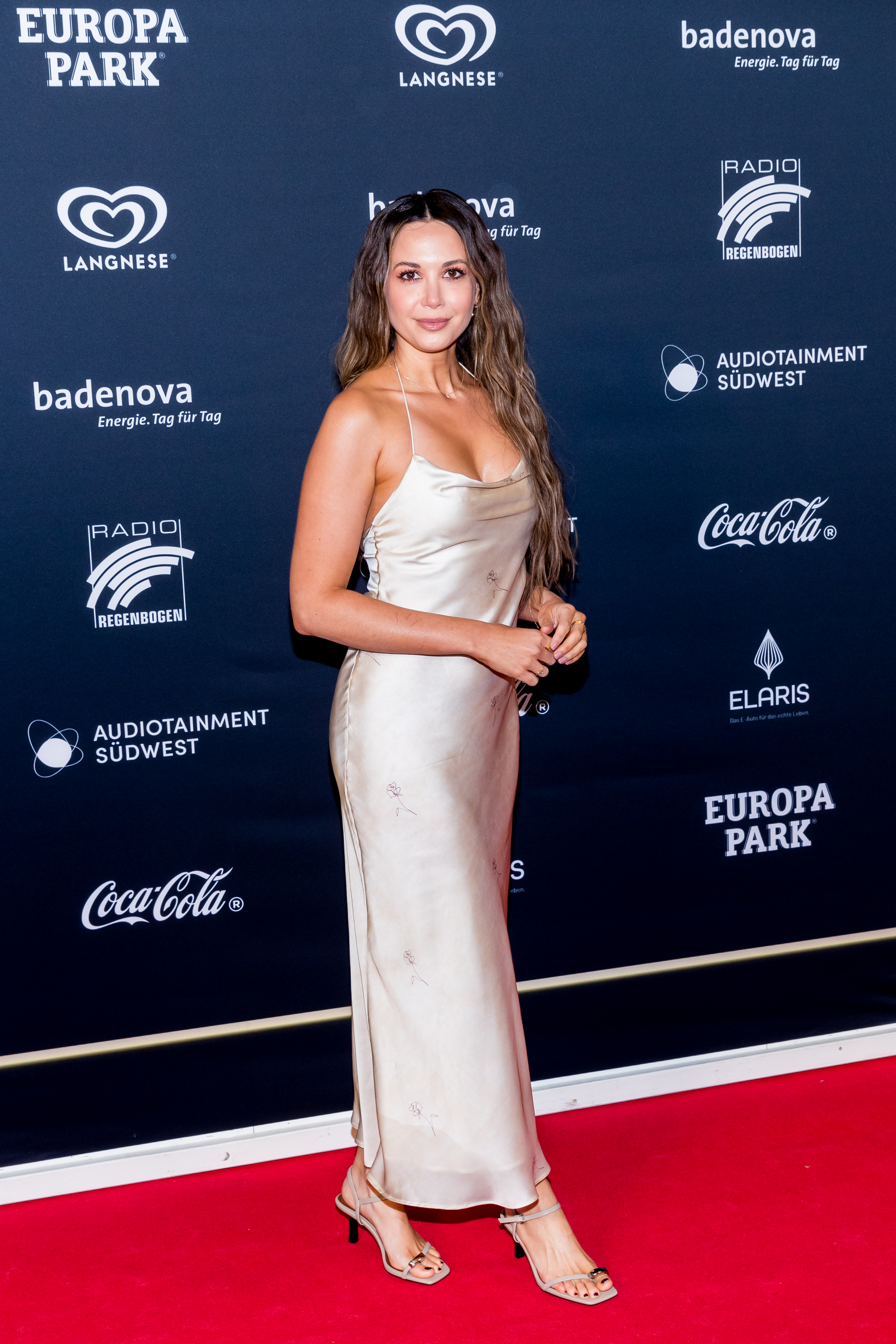
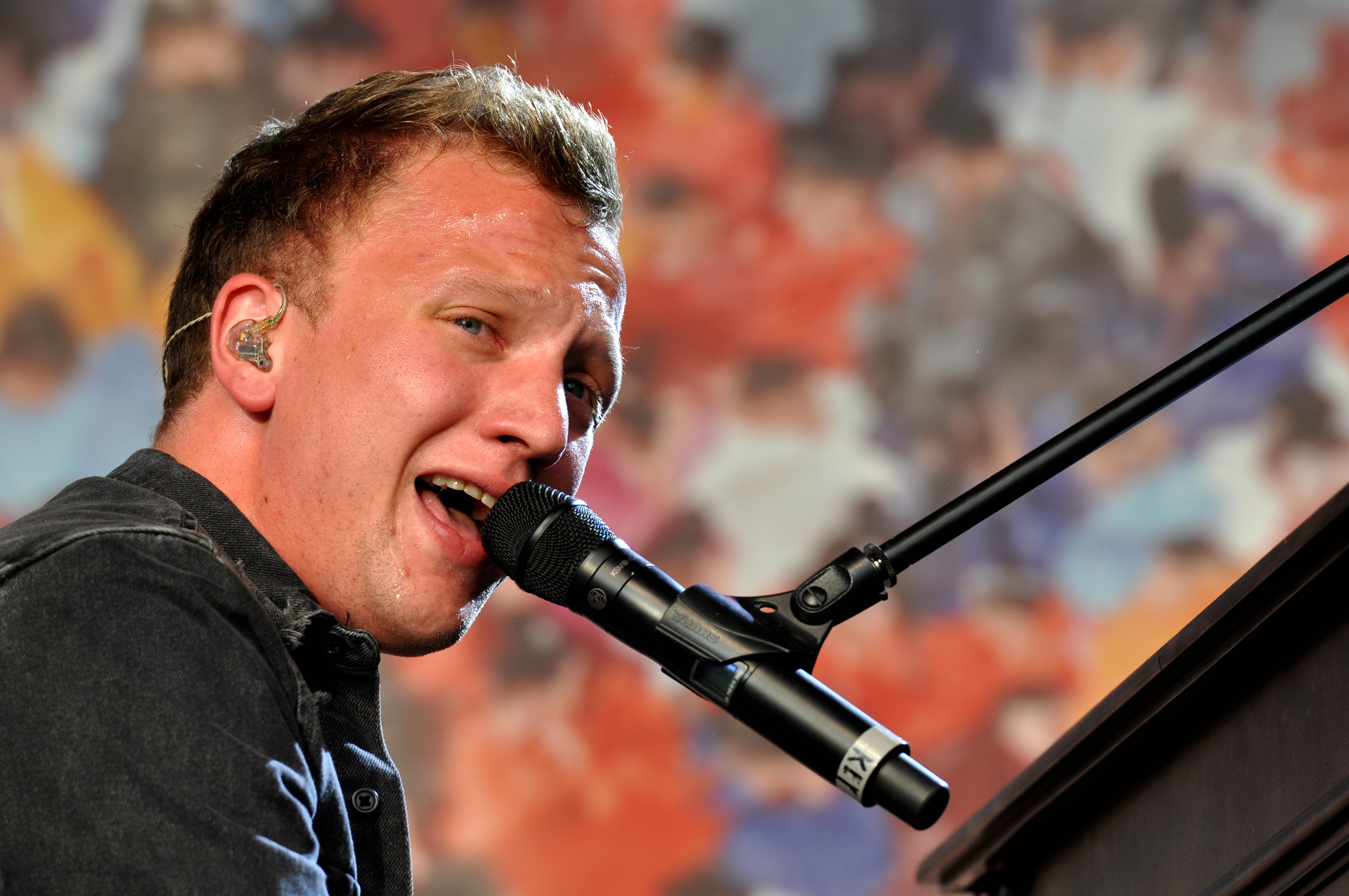
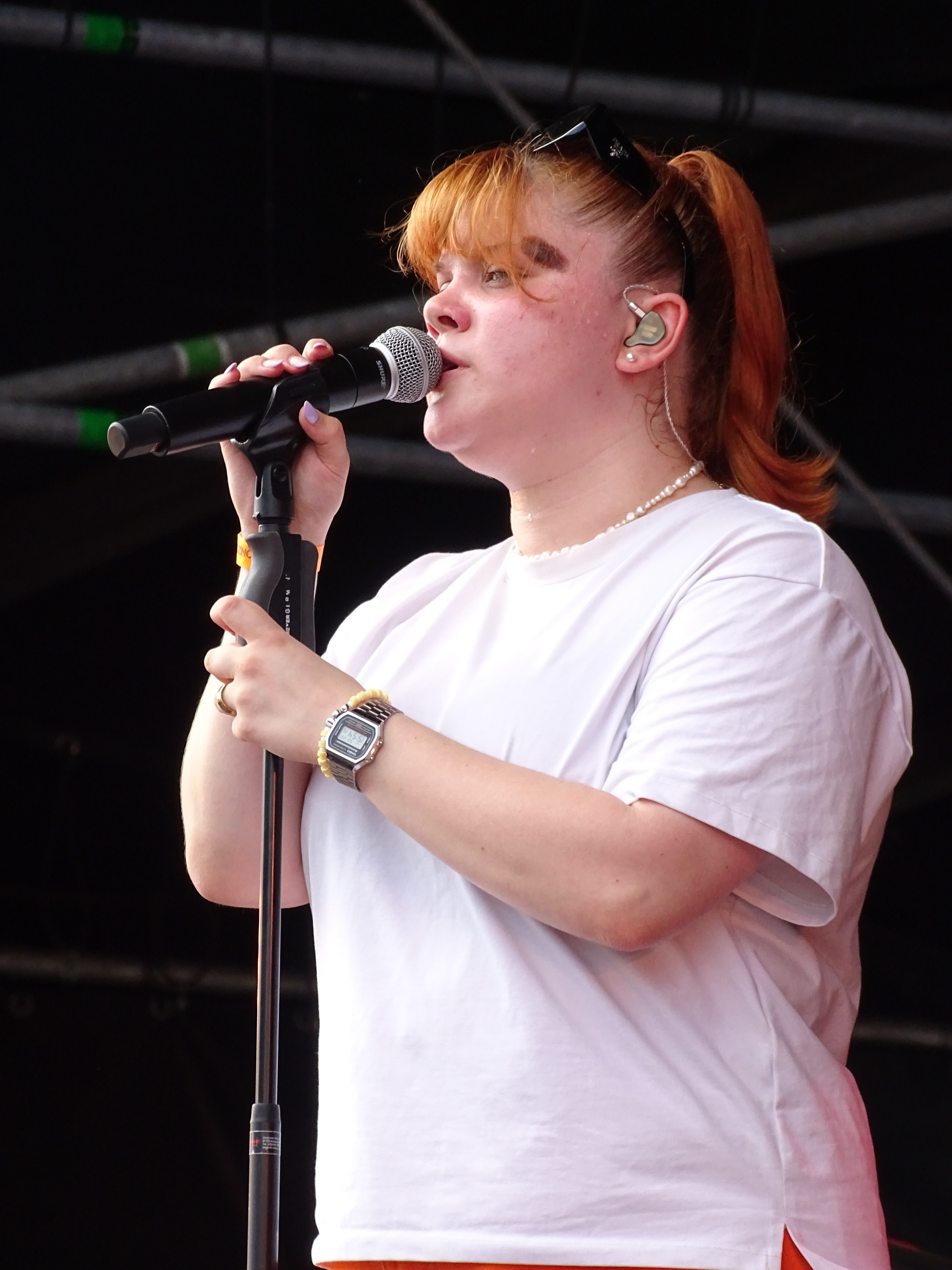
The celebrities who have competed in the eleventh season of The Masked Singer, pictured in order of elimination (l-r):
Pascal Hens ("Nashorn"), Madita von Hülsen ("Lauch"), Maren Kroymann ("Lady Ananas"), Lou Bega ("Schneemann"), Jessica Schwarz ("Feuersalamander"), Mimi Fiedler ("Lokomotive"), Eko Fresh ("Willy W."), Mandy Capristo ("Qualle"), Joris ("Pirat"), Loi ("Panda")

== Episodes ==
=== Week 1 (22 November) ===
Performances on the first live episode
#	Stage name	Song		Identity	Result
1	Lady Ananas	"Lambada" by Kaoma	"Secrets" by OneRepublic (with Rea Garvey)	undisclosed	WIN
2	Qualle	"Ocean Eyes" by Billie Eilish	"Secrets" by OneRepublic (with Rea Garvey)	undisclosed	WIN
3	Nashorn	"Get the Party Started" by Pink	"Secrets" by OneRepublic (with Rea Garvey)	Pascal Hens	OUT
4	Lokomotive	"Take a Chance on Me" by ABBA	"Dance the Night" by Dua Lipa (with Kamrad & Yvonne Catterfeld)	undisclosed	WIN
5	Willi W.	"Nothing's Gonna Change My Love for You" by George Benson	"Dance the Night" by Dua Lipa (with Kamrad & Yvonne Catterfeld)	undisclosed	RISK

=== Week 2 (23 November) ===
Performances on the second live episode
#	Stage name	Song		Identity	Result
1	Pirat	"High Hopes" by Panic! at the Disco	"Blank Space" by Taylor Swift (with Palina Rojinski)	undisclosed	WIN
2	Lauch	"Mambo No. 5" by Lou Bega / "Bauch Beine Po" by Shirin David	"Blank Space" by Taylor Swift (with Palina Rojinski)	Madita van Hülsen	OUT
3	Panda	"Since U Been Gone" by Kelly Clarkson	"Blank Space" by Taylor Swift (with Palina Rojinski)	undisclosed	WIN
4	Feuersalamander	"Physical" by Dua Lipa	"Hot n Cold" by Katy Perry (with Heiko & Roman Lochmann)	undisclosed	RISK
5	Schneemann	"Immer wieder geht die Sonne auf" by Udo Jürgens	"Hot n Cold" by Katy Perry (with Heiko & Roman Lochmann)	undisclosed	WIN

=== Week 3 (30 November) ===
Performances on the third live episode
#	Stage name	Song	Identity	Result
1	Lokomotive	"The Loco-Motion" by Kylie Minogue	undisclosed	RISK
2	Willi W.	"It's Not Unusual" by Tom Jones	undisclosed	RISK
3	Pirat	"Pompeii" by Bastille	undisclosed	WIN
4	Feuersalamander	"Call Me" by Blondie	undisclosed	WIN
5	Panda	"Good 4 U" by Olivia Rodrigo	undisclosed	WIN
6	Schneemann	"Eiskalt" by Culcha Candela / "Ice Ice Baby" by Vanilla Ice	undisclosed	RISK
7	Lady Ananas	"Don't Stop the Music" by Rihanna	Maren Kroymann	OUT
8	Qualle	"Everytime" by Britney Spears	undisclosed	WIN

=== Week 4 (7 December) ===
Performances on the fourth live episode
#	Stage name	Song		Identity	Result
1	Panda	"Strong Enough" by Cher	"Call Me Maybe" by Carly Rae Jepsen	undisclosed	WIN
2	Willi W.	"Last Christmas" by Wham!	"Call Me Maybe" by Carly Rae Jepsen	undisclosed	RISK
3	Lokomotive	"What Was I Made For?" by Billie Eilish	"You're the One That I Want" by John Travolta & Olivia Newton-John	undisclosed	WIN
4	Pirat	"I'm a Believer" by The Monkees	"You're the One That I Want" by John Travolta & Olivia Newton-John	undisclosed	WIN
5	Schneemann	"When You Wish Upon a Star" by Glenn Miller	"You're the One That I Want" by John Travolta & Olivia Newton-John	Lou Bega	OUT
6	Feuersalamander	"Express Yourself" by Madonna	"It's Raining Men" by The Weather Girls	undisclosed	RISK
7	Qualle	"Tattoo" by Loreen	"It's Raining Men" by The Weather Girls	undisclosed	WIN

=== Week 5 (14 December) ===
Performances on the fifth live episode
#	Stage name	Song	Identity	Result
1	Panda	"My Head & My Heart" by Ava Max	undisclosed	WIN
2	Pirat	"I'm Not The Only One" by Sam Smith	undisclosed	RISK
3	Lokomotive	"You Oughta Know" by Alanis Morissette	undisclosed	RISK
4	Willi W.	"Here Comes the Hotstepper" by Ini Kamoze	undisclosed	RISK
5	Feuersalamander	"Right Here Waiting" by Richard Marx	Jessica Schwarz	OUT
6	Qualle	"Together Again" by Janet Jackson	undisclosed	WIN
Sing-off details			Identity	Result
1	Willi W.	"You Spin Me Round (Like a Record)" by Dead or Alive	undisclosed	SAFE
2	Lokomotive	"A Thousand Years" by Christina Perri	Mimi Fiedler	OUT
3	Pirat	"Don't Look Back in Anger" by Oasis	undisclosed	SAFE

=== Week 6 (21 December) - Final ===
- Group number: "Rockin' Around the Christmas Tree" by Brenda Lee

==== Round One ====
Performances on the final live episode – Round one
#	Stage name	Song	Identity	Result
1	Willi W.	"Bye Bye Bye" by NSYNC	Eko Fresh	OUT
2	Qualle	"Dreamgirls" by Jennifer Hudson	undisclosed	SAFE
3	Pirat	"Another Love" by Tom Odell	undisclosed	SAFE
4	Panda	"APT." by Bruno Mars & Rosé	undisclosed	SAFE

==== Round Two ====
Performances on the final live episode – round two
#	Stage name	Song	Identity	Result
1	Qualle	"How Do I Live" by LeAnn Rimes	Mandy Capristo	THIRD
2	Pirat	"Locked Out of Heaven" by Bruno Mars	undisclosed	SAFE
3	Panda	"Hurt" by Christina Aguilera	undisclosed	SAFE

==== Round Three ====
Performances on the final live episode – round three
#	Stage name	Song	Identity	Result
1	Pirat	"Pompeii" by Bastille	Joris	RUNNER-UP
2	Panda	"Since U Been Gone" by Kelly Clarkson	Loi	WINNER

== Reception ==
=== Ratings ===
Episode	Original airdate	Timeslot	Viewers (in millions)		Share (in %)		Source
Episode	Original airdate	Timeslot	Household	Adults 14–49	Household	Adults 14–49	Source
1	22 November 2024	Saturday 8:15 pm	1.21	0.37	5.4	8.4	
2	23 November 2024	Sunday 8:15 pm	1.34	0.48	5.2	8.7	
3	30 November 2024	Saturday 8:15 pm	1.05	0.32	4.9	8.0	
4	7 December 2024	Saturday 8:15 pm	1.09	0.32	5.1	7.4	
5	14 December 2024	Saturday 8:15 pm	0.98	0.29	4.5	7.0	
6	21 December 2024	Saturday 8:15 pm	1.49	0.40	7.0	9.1	
Average			1.19	0.36	5.4	8.1	
