= Gold (Loi song) =

Single by Loi
- Released: 16 September 2022
- Length: 2:50
- Label: Volksmusic
- Songwriters: Felix Jeremias Volk; Leonie Greiner; René Müller; Simon Klose
- Producer: Simon Klose

Loi singles chronology
"Pick Up!" (2022)	"Gold" (2022)	"Snowman" (2022)

"Gold" is a song by German singer Loi. It was released by Volksmusic on 16 September 2022. A French version of the single featuring singer Robin was released by the same label on 30 June 2023.

== Composition and reception ==
According to Loi, "Gold" is "about a person who just makes you feel a little better". She wrote the song with Felix Jeremias Volk, René Müller, and its producer, Simon Klose. "Gold" was the result of a collaboration between Loi, former University of Bonn lecturer Dr. Volkmar Kramarz, and health insurance company Barmer. The lattermost implemented a "musical campaign" with the help of the single to "highlight the positive effects of music and the importance of relaxation" in stressful times. "Gold"'s tempo and rhythm follow a structure developed by Kramarz which aims to "giv[e] people strength and motivation"; the structure is "based on scientific findings on the effect of music on people".

Marina Rößer of Werben & Verkaufen called the single "empowering". Panorama indicated that listeners "will veer towards the same good vibes with which Loi followed her inspiration" for "Gold". Radio Köln thought that with the song, Loi "bring[s] us all back into that late-summer feel-good mood".

== Charts ==
Chart performance for "Gold"
Chart (2023)	Peak position
Austria (Ö3 Austria Top 40)	33
CIS Airplay (TopHit)	81
France (SNEP)	101
Germany (GfK)	35
Poland (Polish Airplay Top 100)	2
Slovakia Airplay (ČNS IFPI)	12
Switzerland (Schweizer Hitparade)	98

== Certifications ==
Certifications for "Gold"
Region	Certification	Certified units/sales
France (SNEP) French version	Gold	100,000^{‡}
Poland (ZPAV)	Gold	25,000^{‡}
^{‡} Sales+streaming figures based on certification alone.

== Release history ==
Release dates and formats for "Gold"
Country	Date	Format(s)	Version	Label	Ref.
Various	16 September 2022	Digital download; streaming	Original	Volksmusic	
Italy	9 December 2022	Airplay	Original	Volksmusic	
France	30 June 2023	Digital download; streaming	French version	Volksmusic	
