= Gregor Meyle =

German singer-songwriter

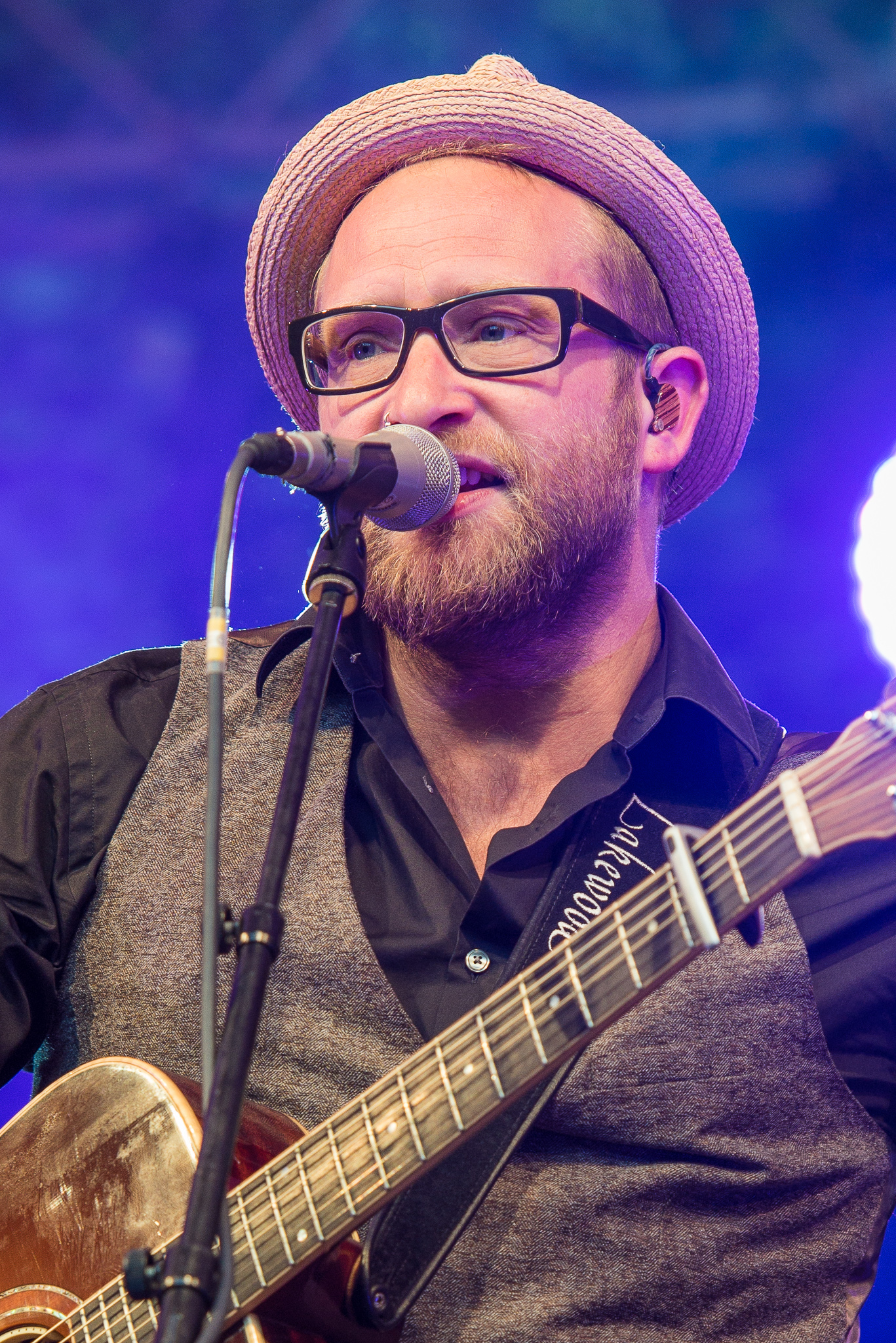
- Meyle in 2015

Background information
- Born: 13 October 1978 (age 46); Backnang, West Germany
- Occupation: Singer-songwriter
- Years active: 2007–present
- Website: www.gregor-meyle.de

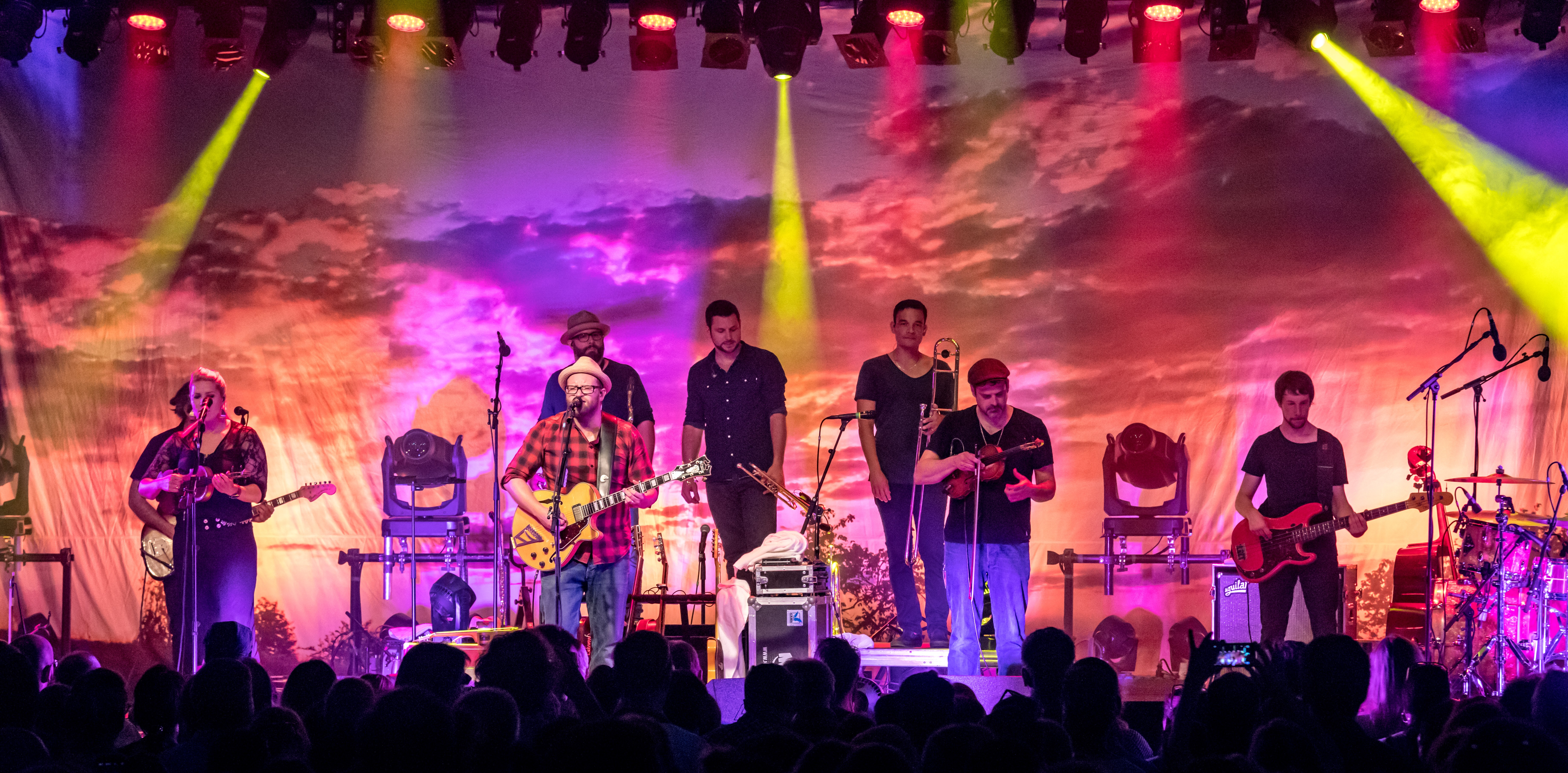
Gregor Meyle at Zelt-Musik-Festival in 2017

Gregor Meyle (born 13 October 1978) is a German singer-songwriter. He first rose to prominence when he auditioned for the talent contest TV Total, hosted in Stefan Raab's late-night-show TV total in late-2007, eventually finishing in second place behind Stefanie Heinzmann.

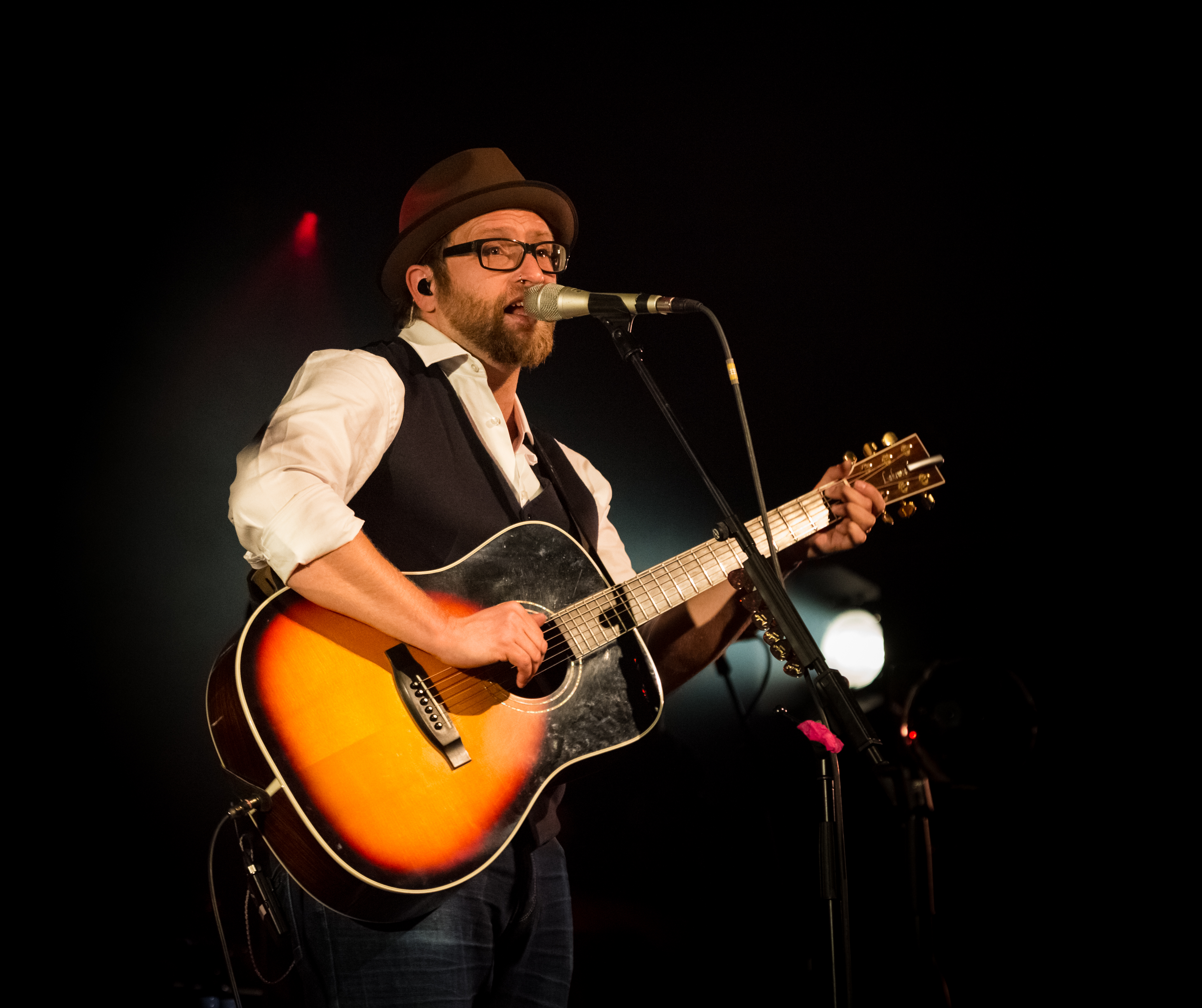
Gregor Meyle live at Leverkusener Jazztage (Germany) in 2016

Meyle achieved even more public recognition when he participated in the reality television series Sing meinen Song – Das Tauschkonzert in 2014, the German version of The Best Singers series. In April 2020, Meyle was infected with Severe acute respiratory syndrome coronavirus 2 (SARS‑CoV‑2). This led to a two-week interruption of the German show The Masked Singer, in which Meyle was a contestant.

== Discography ==
=== Studio albums ===
List of albums, with selected chart positions and certifications
Title	Details	Peak chart positions			Certifications
Title	Details	GER	AUT	SWI	Certifications
So soll es sein	Released: 2008	8	26	31	
Meylenweit	Released: 2010	46	71	—	
Meile für Meyle	Released: 2012	9	5	11	BVMI: Gold
New York – Stintino	Released: 2014	5	4	6	BVMI: Gold
Die Leichtigkeit des Seins	Released: 2016	13	11	39	
Hätt' auch anders kommen können	Released: 2018	11	20	35	
"—" denotes a recording that did not chart or was not released in that territory.
