= The Masked Singer (German TV series) =

German music competition TV show

- Genre: Reality television Game show
- Based on: Masked Singer by Munhwa Broadcasting Corporation
- Presented by: Matthias Opdenhövel
- Starring: Ruth Moschner; Collien Ulmen-Fernandes; Max Giesinger; Rea Garvey; Bülent Ceylan; Sonja Zietlow; Álvaro Soler; Rick Kavanian; Palina Rojinski; Chris Tall; Verona Pooth
- Opening theme: "Who Are You" by The Who
- Country of origin: Germany
- Original language: German
- No. of seasons: 13
- No. of episodes: 78

Production
- Production locations: MMC Studios, Cologne
- Running time: approx. 180 to 200 minutes per episode (including commercials)
- Production company: EndemolShine Germany

Original release
- Network: ProSieben
- Release: 27 June 2019 – present

Related
- Masked Singer franchise; King of Mask Singer; The Masked Singer (US)

The Masked Singer is a German reality singing competition television series that premiered on ProSieben on 27 June 2019. It is part of the Masked Singer franchise which began in South Korea and features celebrities singing songs while wearing head-to-toe costumes and face masks concealing their identities. Hosted by Matthias Opdenhövel, the program employs panelists who guess the celebrities' identities by interpreting clues provided to them throughout each season. Since the twelfth season, Chris Tall and Verona Pooth are the main panelists. Other panelists from previous seasons include Collien Ulmen-Fernandes, Max Giesinger, Bülent Ceylan, Sonja Zietlow, Álvaro Soler, Ruth Moschner, Rick Kavanian, Palina Rojinski and Rea Garvey. The audience votes for their favorite singer after all perform. The least popular is eliminated, taking off their mask to reveal their identity.

== Production ==
The broadcast format started in South Korea in 2015 as King of Mask Singer. After further offshoots in Asia and the United States in January 2019, the show was announced in March 2019 to begin in Germany and made its debut in June 2019 on ProSieben. On 24 April 2020, ProSieben announced the third season, which began airing on 20 October 2020. The fourth season, which was announced shortly after, began airing on 16 February 2021. The fifth season was announced on 18 March 2021 and began airing on 16 October 2021.

During the fifth season, it was announced that the series had been renewed for a sixth season, which premiered on 19 March 2022. On the second episode of the sixth season, Matthias Opdenhövel announced the seventh season of the show, which premiered on 1 October 2022.

=== Format ===
In each live episode, celebrities such as singers, actors or athletes compete against each other in a singing competition anonymously in costumes. The voices of the celebrities are distorted beyond recognition outside of singing.

In the first season, viewers voted by Televoting after each Duel or Truel, since the second season voting took place exclusively via the ProSieben-app. The winners may keep the mask on and participate in the next episode. With repeated or without repeated singing, the losers have to wait for the final vote of the respective show. The singer with the fewest votes has to take off his or her mask and leave the show. The others continue to participate.

In seasons 1 and 3, in the final of the last five there was a vote after the vocal performances, after which the person with the fewest votes was eliminated and unmasked. This was followed by two semi-final duels, the losers of which had to reveal themselves and the winners of which competed in the final duel. Finally, their identity was also revealed. In season 2 and since season 4, there is a final four. After each round of performing, one contestant has to leave and take off his or her mask. After the final duel, the winner of the season is revealed. In season 10, there were only three contestants in the final. After the first round the first mask fell. The last two contestants competed in the second and the third round.

In the second season, contestant Angelo Kelly left the competition voluntarily in episode 3 due to the COVID-19 pandemic.

In addition to the singing competition, hints to each masked singer's identity are offered during the show. Pre-taped interviews are given as hints and feature celebrities' distorted voices. The panelists are given time to speculate the identity of the singer after the performance and ask them a single question to try to determine their identity.

The opening theme is "Who Are You" by The Who.

After each appearance, the two panelist members – three during the first season – and a guest member of the advice team who changes from episode to episode express their guess as to who is under the mask. The panelist team also asks a question to almost every singer, who only answers vaguely or evasively. Before making any decision, the panelist team makes an assumption after the voting has ended, for whom it will be tight or who will be eliminated. Before unmasking, the panelists are once more asked to give their final guess about who is beneath the mask. In season 11, each episode featured two teams competing against each other to guess the celebrities: a permanent team and a rotating guest team.

=== Security ===
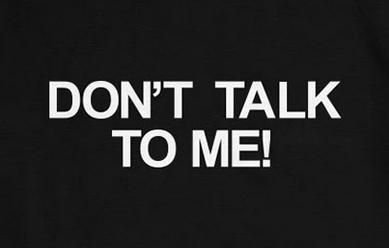
The front of hoodies celebrities wear while off camera.

The show has an 'extreme security protocol' in effect both during and after filming to protect the celebrity's identities from leaking. Everyone involved in the show signed a non-disclosure agreement which prevented anyone from revealing any information about the shooting dates, costumes or identities of the masks episode until its broadcast. The celebrities who appear on the show are only allowed to inform their spouse about their participation, who must also sign one.

Due to the show's security, celebrities said they never encountered another masked participant on set, or if they did, could not speak to them. They are only allowed to communicate with those who wear a special cloth on the back of their clothing which is changed each season to prevent replication or those who wear a shirt with the words "Talk to Me". To do so, they use a portable voice changer or write on a whiteboard.

=== Costumes ===
The costumes worn by the celebrity contestants were designed by Marina Toybina, a four-time Emmy Award winner and by Alexandra Brander. Each costume costs on average between 15,000 and 20,000 Euros and takes around 300 hours of manual labor.

=== Filming ===
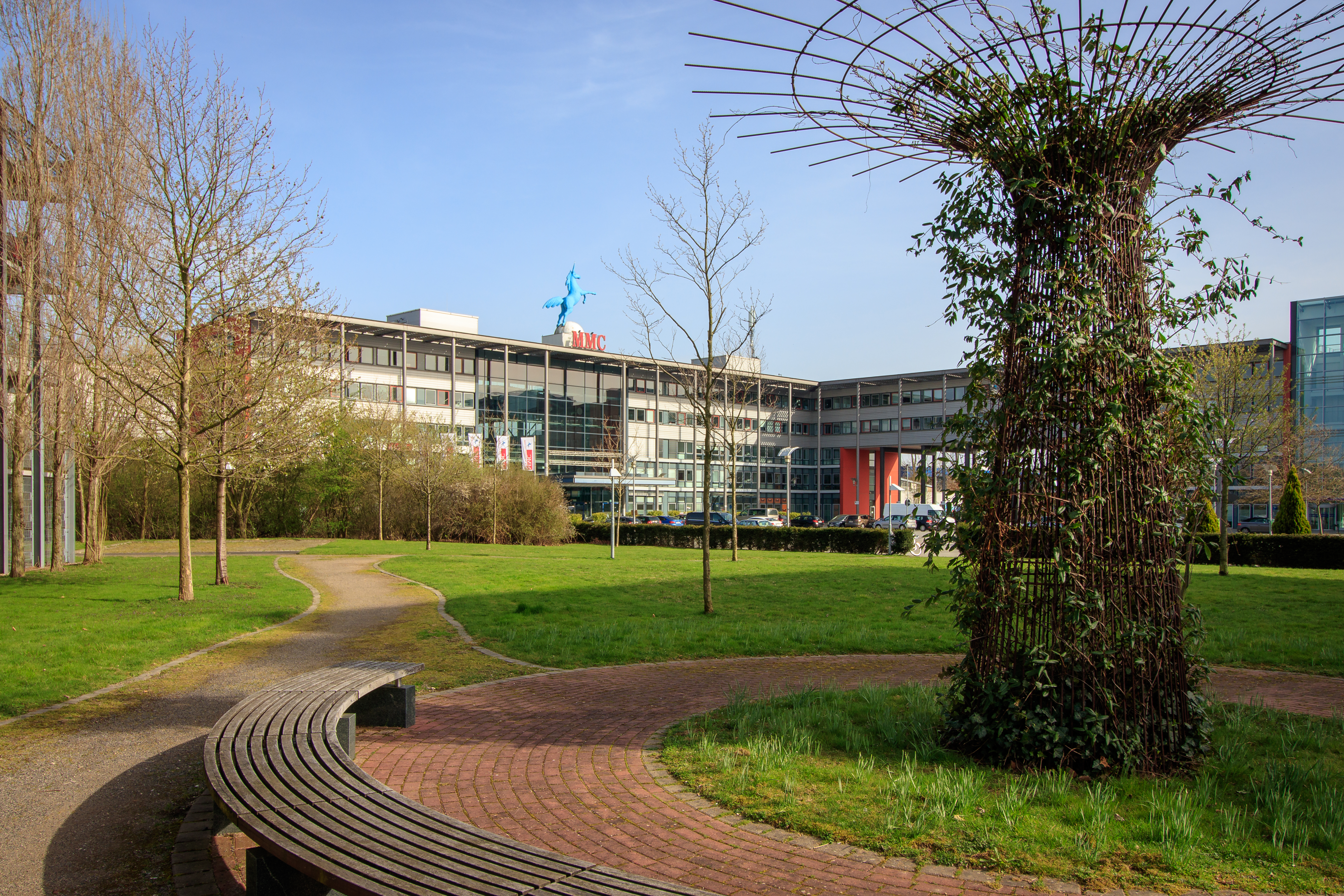
MMC Studios, the filming location of the show.

Filming of the show took place at MMC Studios in Cologne. The Masked Singer Austria and The Masked Singer Switzerland are produced in the same studio as the German version.

On 12 March 2020 in the second season of the show, ProSieben announced that, as a precautionary measure against the spread of the coronavirus, all shows, including The Masked Singer, would be producing without a studio audience until further notice. On 29 March 2020, ProSieben announced that it would interrupt the show due to two COVID-19 infections within the team and the show continued from 14 April 2020.

ProSieben announced that the third season of the show, would be again produced with audience. On 30 October 2020, after the second episode, ProSieben announced that it would once again be producing without a studio audience until further notice.

The fourth season, produced again without audience.

After a year and a half of a pandemic-related break, the fifth season was seen a live audience in the studio for the first time.

== Panelists and host ==
Current season panelists and host

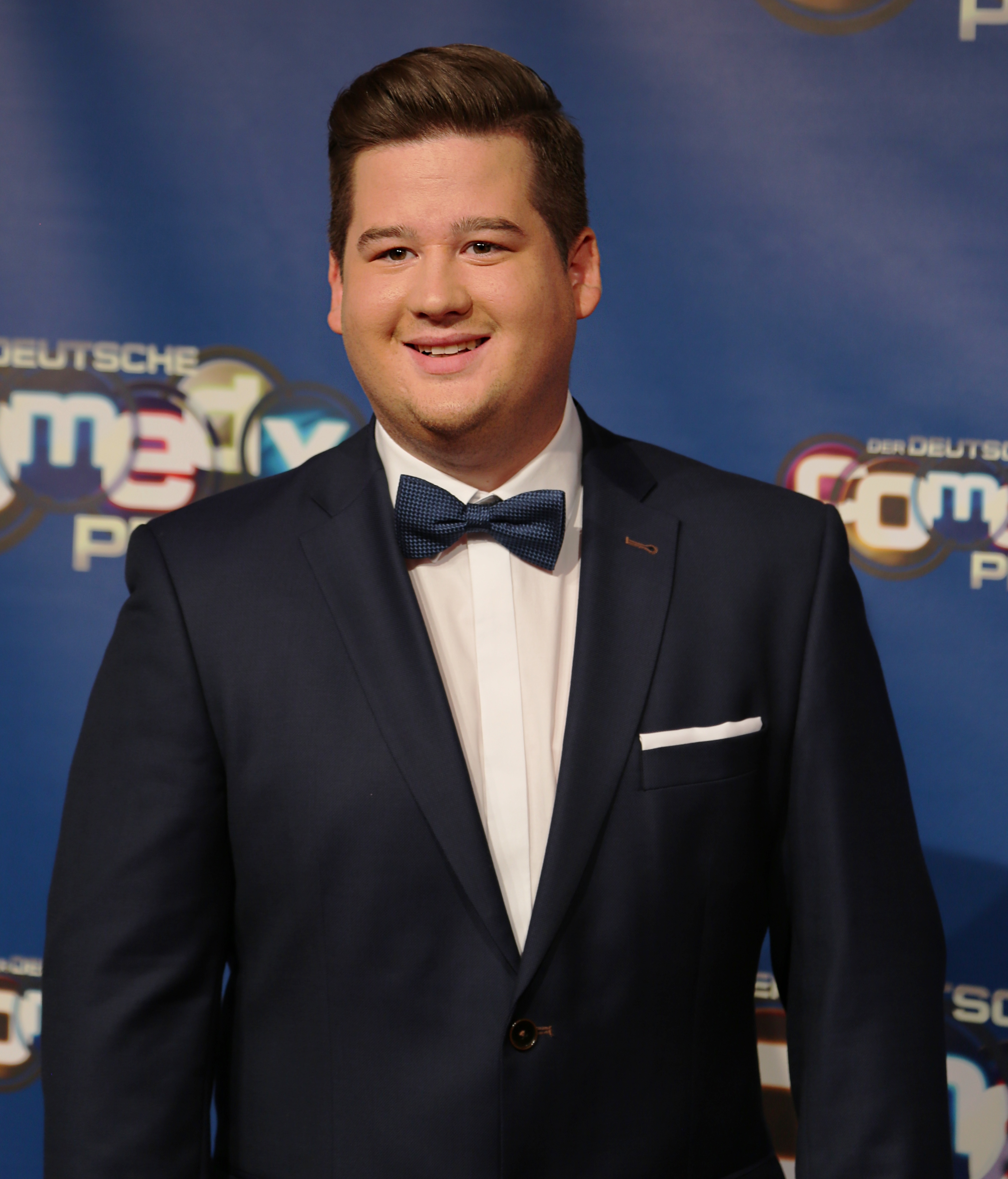
Chris Tall

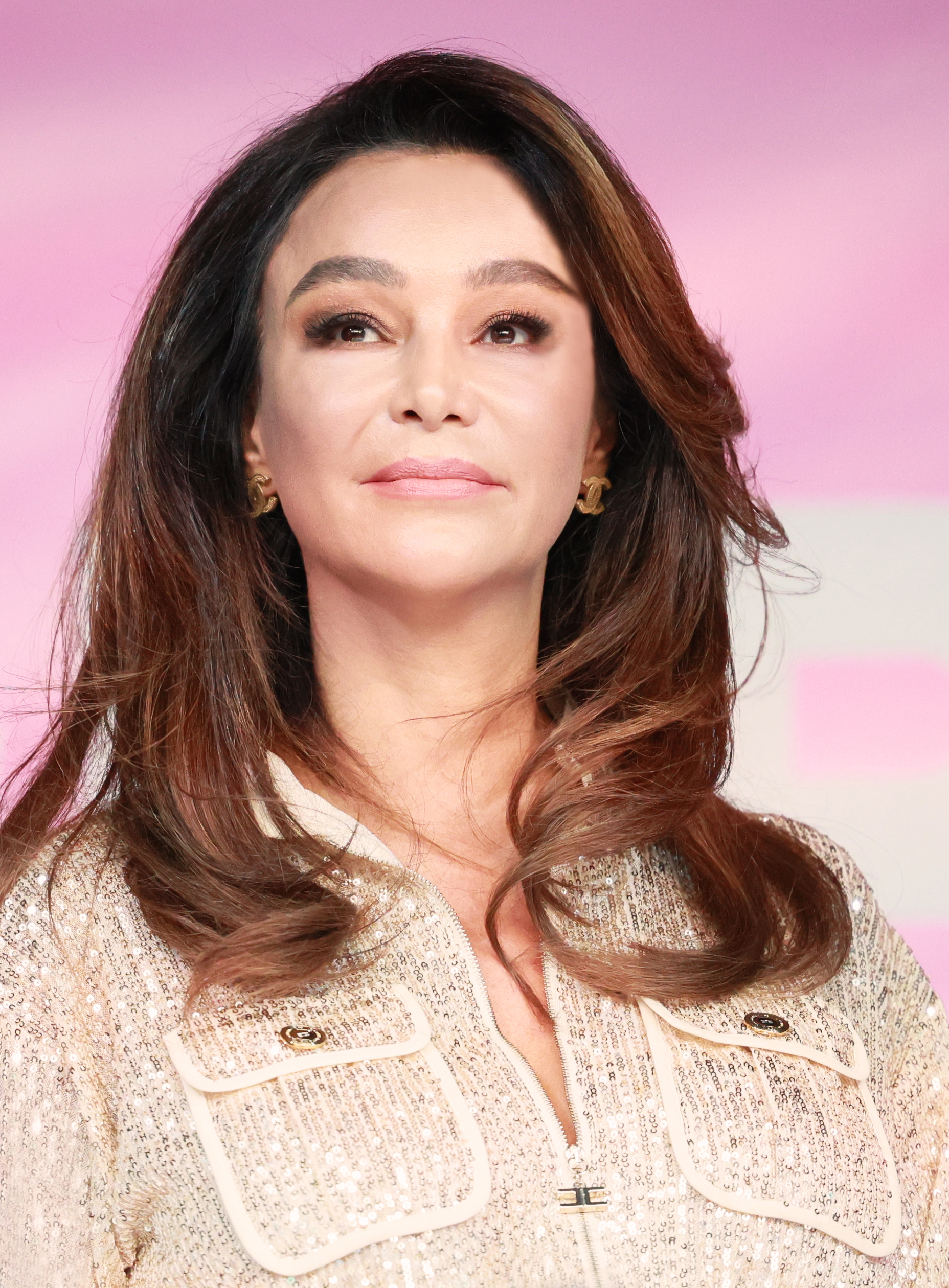
Verona Pooth

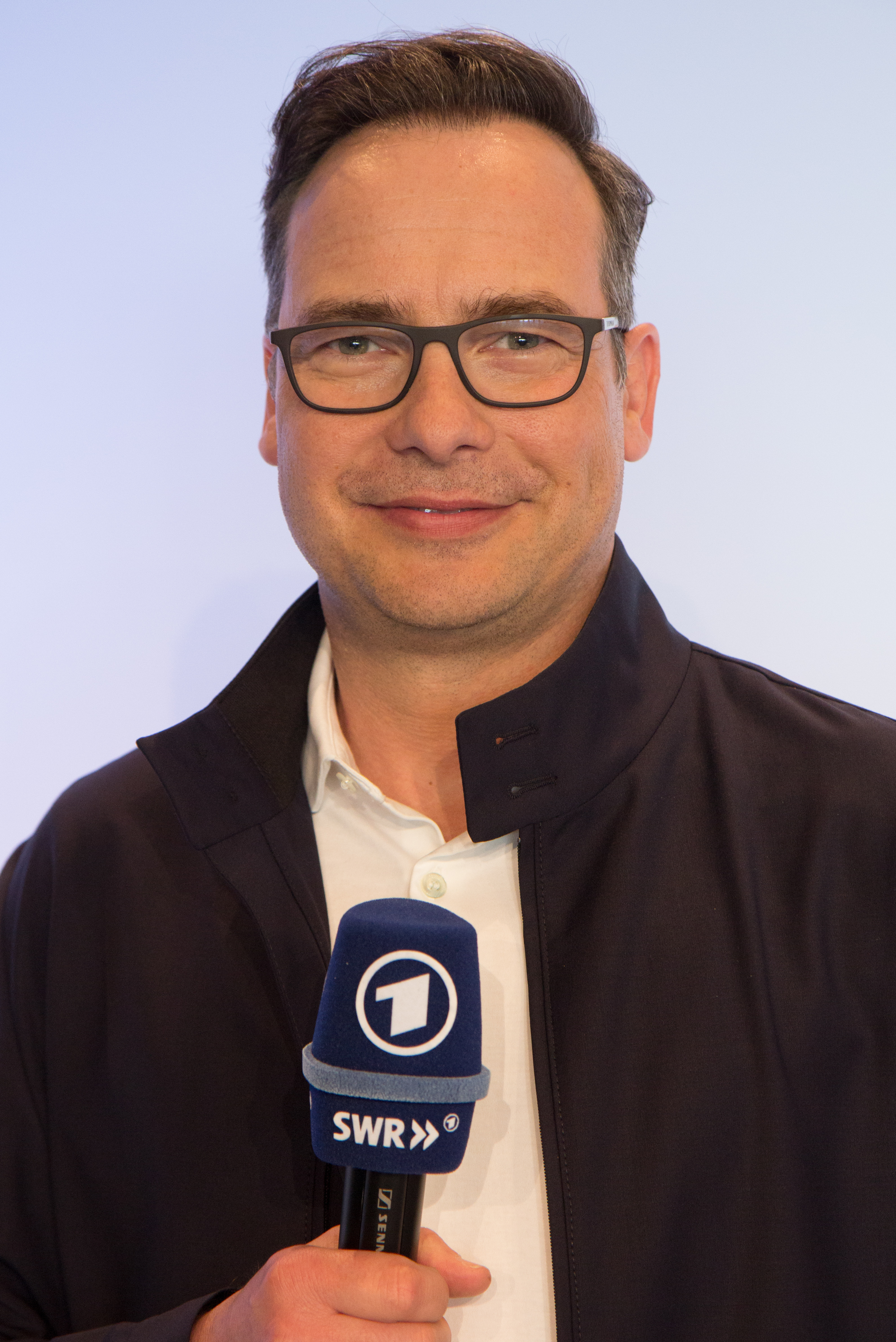
Matthias Opdenhövel

Since the first season, host of the show is Matthias Opdenhövel. In the first two seasons, the permanent panel has consisted of TV presenter Ruth Moschner. In the first season, the other two panelists were actor Collien Ulmen-Fernandes and singer Max Giesinger. In the second season, singer Rea Garvey, replaced Ulmen-Fernandes and Giesinger. In the third season the panelists included comedian Bülent Ceylan and TV presenter Sonja Zietlow. In the fourth season, Moschner and Garvey returned to the panel. The fifth season, Moschner was her fourth time and Garvey was his third time, as the main panelists. Also in the sixth season, Moschner and Garvey were the main panelists. Thore Schölermann acted as guest host for the first episode of the sixth season after Opdenhövel tested positive for COVID-19. In the seventh season, Moschner was only the main panelist and in the eighth season, Garvey returned as main panelist alongside Moschner. In the ninth season, Moschner returned as main panelist, with Álvaro Soler (episodes 1-3) and Rick Kavanian (episodes 4-6) as new main panelists, replacing Garvey. In the tenth season, Kavanian returned as main panelist, with new member Palina Rojinski. Rojinski returned for the eleventh season, with Garvey returning after a two season hiatus. On the twelfth season Chris Tall and Verona Pooth are the main panelists.

Cast timeline
| Cast | Seasons | | | | | | | | | | | | |
| Cast | 1 | 2 | 3 | 4 | 5 | 6 | 7 | 8 | 9 | 10 | 11 | 12 | 13 |
Host
| Matthias Opdenhövel | M | M | M | M | M | M | M | M | M | M | M | M | M |
| Thore Schölermann | | | | C | | G | | | | | | | |
Panelists
| Ruth Moschner | M | M | G | M | M | M | M | M | M | | | | C/G |
| Collien Ulmen-Fernandes | M | | | | | | | | | | | | |
| Max Giesinger | M | | | | | | | | | G | | | |
| Rea Garvey | G | M | G | M | M | M | G | M | G | | M | | |
| Bülent Ceylan | C | G | M | | | | | | | | | | |
| Sonja Zietlow | | C | M | | | | | | | | | | |
| Álvaro Soler | | | | | G | | | | M | | | G | |
| Rick Kavanian | | | | | | | C | G | M | M | G | | |
| Palina Rojinski | | | | | | | | | | M | M | | |
| Chris Tall | | | | | | | | | | G | G | M | M |
| Verona Pooth | | | | | | | | | | | | M | M |

== Series overview ==
Series overview
| Series | Contestants | Episodes | Originally released | | Winner | Runner-up | Third place |
| Series | Contestants | Episodes | First released | Last released | Winner | Runner-up | Third place |
|---|---|---|---|---|---|---|---|
| 1 | 10 | 6 | 27 June 2019 | 1 August 2019 | Max Mutzke as "Astronaut" | Gil Ofarim as "Grashüpfer" | Bülent Ceylan as "Engel" |
| 2 | 10 | 6 | 10 March 2020 | 28 April 2020 | Tom Beck as "Faultier" | Mike Singer as "Wuschel" | Gregor Meyle as "Drache" |
| 3 | 10+1 | 6 | 20 October 2020 | 24 November 2020 | Sarah Lombardi as "Skelett" | Alec Völkel as "Alien" | Nelson Müller as "Nilpferd" |
| 4 | 10 | 6 | 16 February 2021 | 23 March 2021 | Sasha as "Dinosaurier" | Cassandra Steen as "Leopard" | Ross Antony as "Flamingo" |
| 5 | 10 | 6 | 16 October 2021 | 20 November 2021 | Alexander Klaws as "Mülli Müller" | Sandy Mölling as "Raupe" | Christina Stürmer as "Heldin" |
| 6 | 10 | 6 | 19 March 2022 | 23 April 2022 | Ella Endlich as "Zebra" | Mark Keller as "Dornteufel" | Jeanette Biedermann as "Discokugel" |
| 7 | 9 | 6 | 1 October 2022 | 5 November 2022 | Daniel Donskoy as "Maulwurf" | Bürger Lars Dietrich as "Werwolf" | Rick Kavanian as "Rosty" |
| 8 | 9 | 6 | 1 April 2023 | 6 May 2023 | Luca Hänni as "Schuhschnabel" | Felicitas Woll as "Igel" | Patricia Kelly as "Mystica" |
| 9 | 9 | 6 | 18 November 2023 | 23 December 2023 | Jennifer Weist as "Eisprinzessin" | Pasquale Aleardi as "Lulatsch" | Hendrik Duryn as "Mustang" |
| 10 | 8+1+6 | 6 | 6 April 2024 | 18 May 2024 | Mirja Boes as "Floh" | Heiko Lochmann & Roman Lochmann as "Flip Flops" | Sebastian Krumbiegel as "Krokodil" |
| 11 | 10 | 6 | 23 November 2024 | 21 December 2024 | Loi as "Panda" | Joris as "Pirat" | Mandy Capristo as "Qualle" |
| 12 | 9 | 6 | 8 November 2025 | 13 December 2025 | Meltem Kaptan as "Muuhnika" | Pietro Lombardi as "Rave-ioli" | Wayne Carpendale as "King" |
| 13 | 16 | 6 | 16 September 2026 | 21 October 2026 | Vincent Gross as "Fernando El Toro" | Anna-Carina Woitschack as "Wild Thing" | Joey Heindle as "P.S." |

== Reception ==
=== Television ratings ===
The finale of season 1 broke records for the highest market shares of all time for a ProSieben show format in the 14–49 age group in Germany and in the age group 12 to 49 in Austria. The final of the second season, achieved the highest audience rating of a ProSieben show to date. The fifth season of the show was broadcast for the first time on Saturdays, which accommodated a wish of the audience.

| Season | Time slot | No. of episodes | Premiered | | Ended | | TV season | Viewers (in millions) |
| Season | Time slot | No. of episodes | Date | Viewers (in millions) | Date | Viewers (in millions) | TV season | Viewers (in millions) |
|---|---|---|---|---|---|---|---|---|
| 1 | Thursdays 8:15 pm | 6 | 27 June 2019 | 2.19 | 1 August 2019 | 4.34 | 2018–2019 | 3.15 |
| 2 | Tuesdays 8:15 pm | 6 | 10 March 2020 | 3.32 | 28 April 2020 | 5.34 | 2019–2020 | 4.15 |
| 3 | Tuesdays 8:15 pm | 6 | 20 October 2020 | 3.33 | 24 November 2020 | 3.65 | 2020–2021 | 3.33 |
| 4 | Tuesdays 8:15 pm | 6 | 16 February 2021 | 3.55 | 23 March 2021 | 3.75 | 2020–2021 | 3.42 |
| 5 | Saturdays 8:15 pm | 6 | 16 October 2021 | 2.96 | 20 November 2021 | 3.25 | 2021–2022 | 2.83 |
| 6 | Saturdays 8:15 pm | 6 | 19 March 2022 | 2.46 | 23 April 2022 | 2.48 | 2021–2022 | 2.24 |
| 7 | Saturdays 8:15 pm | 6 | 1 October 2022 | 2.42 | 5 November 2022 | 2.29 | 2022–2023 | 2.17 |
| 8 | Saturdays 8:15 pm | 6 | 1 April 2023 | 2.19 | 6 May 2023 | 2.00 | 2022–2023 | 3.15 |
| 9 | Saturdays 8:15 pm | 6 | 18 November 2023 | 1.79 | 23 December 2023 | 1.68 | 2023–2024 | 1.64 |
| 10 | Saturdays 8:15 pm | 6 | 6 April 2024 | 1.46 | 18 May 2024 | 1.38 | 2023–2024 | 1.31 |
| 11 | Saturdays 8:15 pm | 6 | 22 November 2024 | 1.21 | 21 December 2024 | 1.49 | 2024–2025 | 1.19 |
| 12 | Saturdays 8:15 pm | 6 | 8 November 2025 | TBA | 2025 | TBA | 2025–2026 | TBA |

=== Awards and nominations ===
| Year | Award | Category | Nominee | Result | Ref |
|---|---|---|---|---|---|
| 2020 | Deutscher Fernsehpreis | Best Entertainment Show | The Masked Singer | Won | |
| 2020 | Deutscher Fernsehpreis | Best Director Entertainment | Mark Achterberg | Nominated | |
| 2020 | Deutscher Fernsehpreis | Best Framing Entertainment | Alexandra Brandner (Costume Design) | Won | |

== Spin-offs and related shows ==
=== The Masked Singer – red. Special ===
The Masked Singer – red. Special is the companion show presented by the presenters of the show red. Annemarie Carpendale, Viviane Geppert and Rebecca Mir. The show it is shown on ProSieben immediately after the main show. The show features interviews with the panelists and the unmasked celebrity from that episode.

=== red. – The Masked Singer Countdown ===
In the first three seasons, a spin-off with the name red. – The Masked Singer Countdown, which was presented by Annemarie Carpendale, it was shown on ProSieben, which aired only for 15 Minutes before the final episode. The show features interviews with the panelists and the presenter of the main show, Matthias Opdenhövel.

Only in the second season, Viviane Geppert hosted the show, which was aired before the premiere of the first live show.

=== The Masked Singer – So hat alles angefangen ===
The Masked Singer – So hat alles angefangen (That's how it all started) is a show that aired on 31 December 2020 on ProSieben and showed how The Masked Singer began in Germany. The best performances of the celebrity contestants and the best and funniest moments from the first season, were shown once again. Also, the celebrities from the first season, presenter Matthias Opdenhövel and panelist Ruth Moschner spoke about their personal experiences with the show.

=== The Masked Singer – Die rätselhafte Weihnachtsshow ===
On 26 October 2021, it was announced by ProSieben, they would broadcast a Christmas special for the first time in December, with the name The Masked Singer – Die rätselhafte Weihnachtsshow (The Masked Singer – The enigmatic Christmas show). It took place on 26 December 2021. As part of this there were three new masks. The presenter of the Christmas special is Matthias Opdenhövel. The panel consists of TV presenter Ruth Moschner, singer Rea Garvey and actress Andrea Sawatzki.

==== Contestants ====
On the final episode of the fifth season, Rentier "Reindeer" was announced as the first contestant. On 14 December, further competitors Gans "Goose" and Geschenk "Present" were revealed.

Results
| Stage name | Celebrity | Notability | Episode | |
| Stage name | Celebrity | Notability | 1 | |
| Stage name | Celebrity | Notability | A | B |
|---|---|---|---|---|
| Gans "Goose" | Yvonne Catterfeld | Singer | SAFE | WINNER |
| Geschenk "Present" | Mickie Krause | Singer | SAFE | RUNNER-UP |
| Rentier "Reindeer" | Steven Gätjen | Presenter | THIRD | |

The masked singer was safe from elimination.

==== Christmas episode (26 December) ====
- Group number: "All I Want for Christmas Is You" by Mariah Carey

===== Round One =====
Performances on the Christmas episode – round one
| # | Stage name | Song | Identity | Result |
|---|---|---|---|---|
| 1 | Gans | "Santa Claus Is Comin' to Town" by J. Fred Coots | undisclosed | SAFE |
| 2 | Rentier | "Fröhliche Weihnacht überall" | Steven Gätjen | THIRD |
| 3 | Geschenk | "Ave Maria" by Johann Sebastian Bach/"Jingle Bells" by Frank Sinatra | undisclosed | SAFE |

===== Round Two =====
Performances on the Christmas episode – round one
| # | Stage name | Song | Identity | Result |
|---|---|---|---|---|
| 1 | Gans | "Have Yourself a Merry Little Christmas" by Hugh Martin & Ralph Blane | Yvonne Catterfeld | WINNER |
| 2 | Geschenk | "Don't You (Forget About Me)" by Simple Minds | Mickie Krause | RUNNER-UP |

==== Ratings ====
| Episode | Original airdate | Timeslot | Viewers (in millions) | | Share (in %) | | Source |
| Episode | Original airdate | Timeslot | Household | Adults 14–49 | Household | Adults 14–49 | Source |
|---|---|---|---|---|---|---|---|
| Christmas special | 26 December 2021 | Sunday 8:15 pm | 1.92 | 0.96 | 6.5 | 12.7 | |

=== The Masked Dancer ===
In June 2021, EndemolShine Germany announced a dancing spinoff series that shares the same name of the American version. In November 2021, it was announced that ProSieben would broadcast the show. The show began airing on 6 January 2022, with Opdenhövel hosting the show and with Alexander Klaws and Steven Gätjen serving as panelists. The show had 7 contestants competing through four live episodes.
