= The Masked Singer (German TV series) season 2 =

The Masked Singer
- Season 2
- Starring: Ruth Moschner; Rea Garvey; Various guests
- Hosted by: Matthias Opdenhövel
- No. of contestants: 10
- Winner: Tom Beck as "Faultier"
- Runner-up: Mike Singer as "Wuschel"
- No. of episodes: 6

Release
- Original network: ProSieben
- Original release: 10 March – 28 April 2020

Season chronology
- ← Previous; Season 1 Next → Season 3

The second season of the German singing competition The Masked Singer premiered on 10 March 2020 on ProSieben. Ruth Moschner returned in the panel, with Rea Garvey, replacing Collien Ulmen-Fernandes and Max Giesinger. Matthias Opdenhövel also returned as host.

In this season, the viewers vote after each Duel or Truel, only via the ProSieben-app.

On 28 April 2020, the Faultier (actor and singer Tom Beck) was declared the winner and the Wuschel (singer Mike Singer) was the runner-up.

On 29 March 2020, ProSieben announced to cease the show's production for two weeks because three people from the production team tested positive with COVID-19. The channel also announced that the show would return on 14 April. In the final, it was revealed that Gregor Meyle, who sang as the Drache, and Tom Beck, who sang as the Faultier, were the two people who contracted the virus.

== Panelists and host ==
Season 2 panelists and host

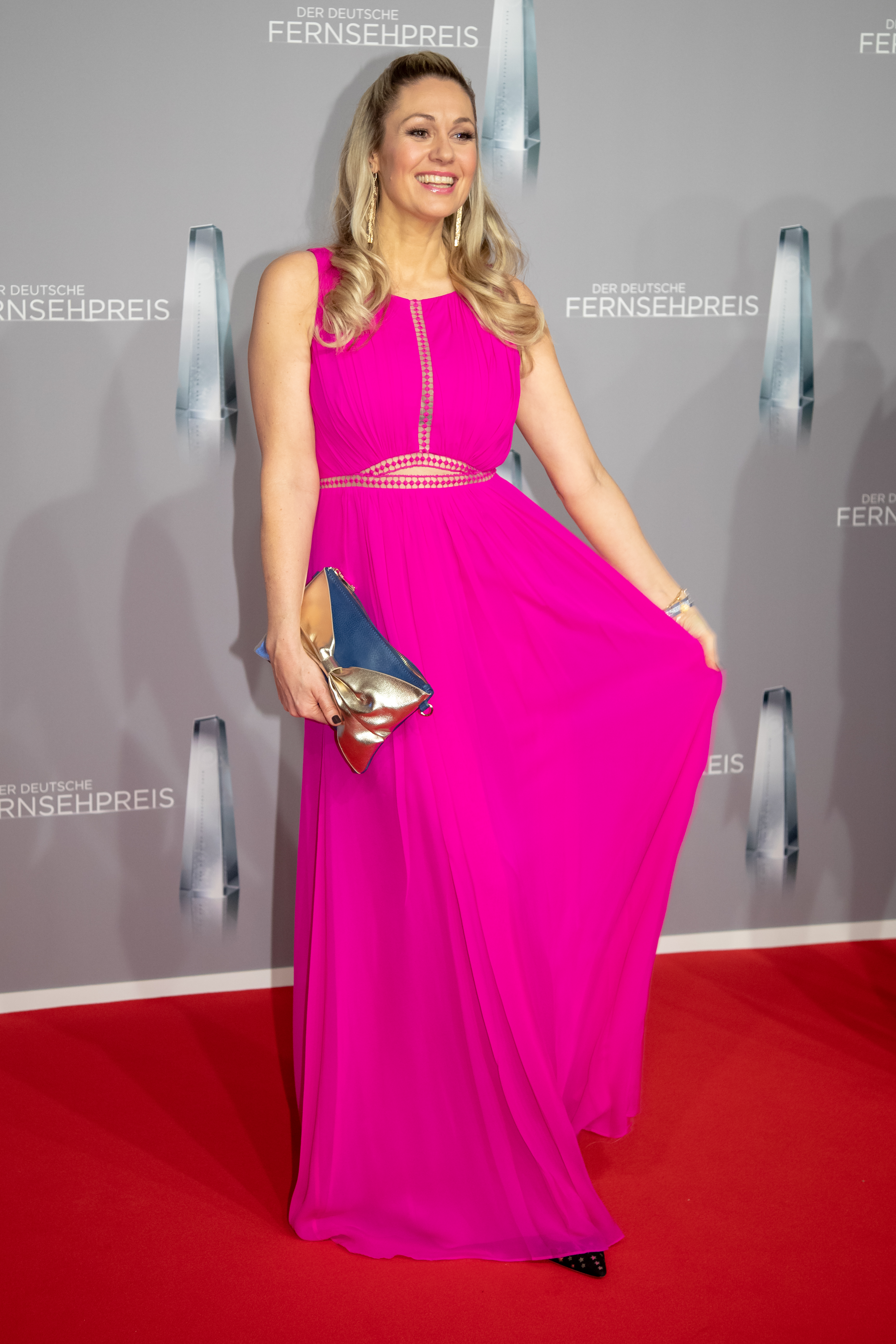
Ruth Moschner

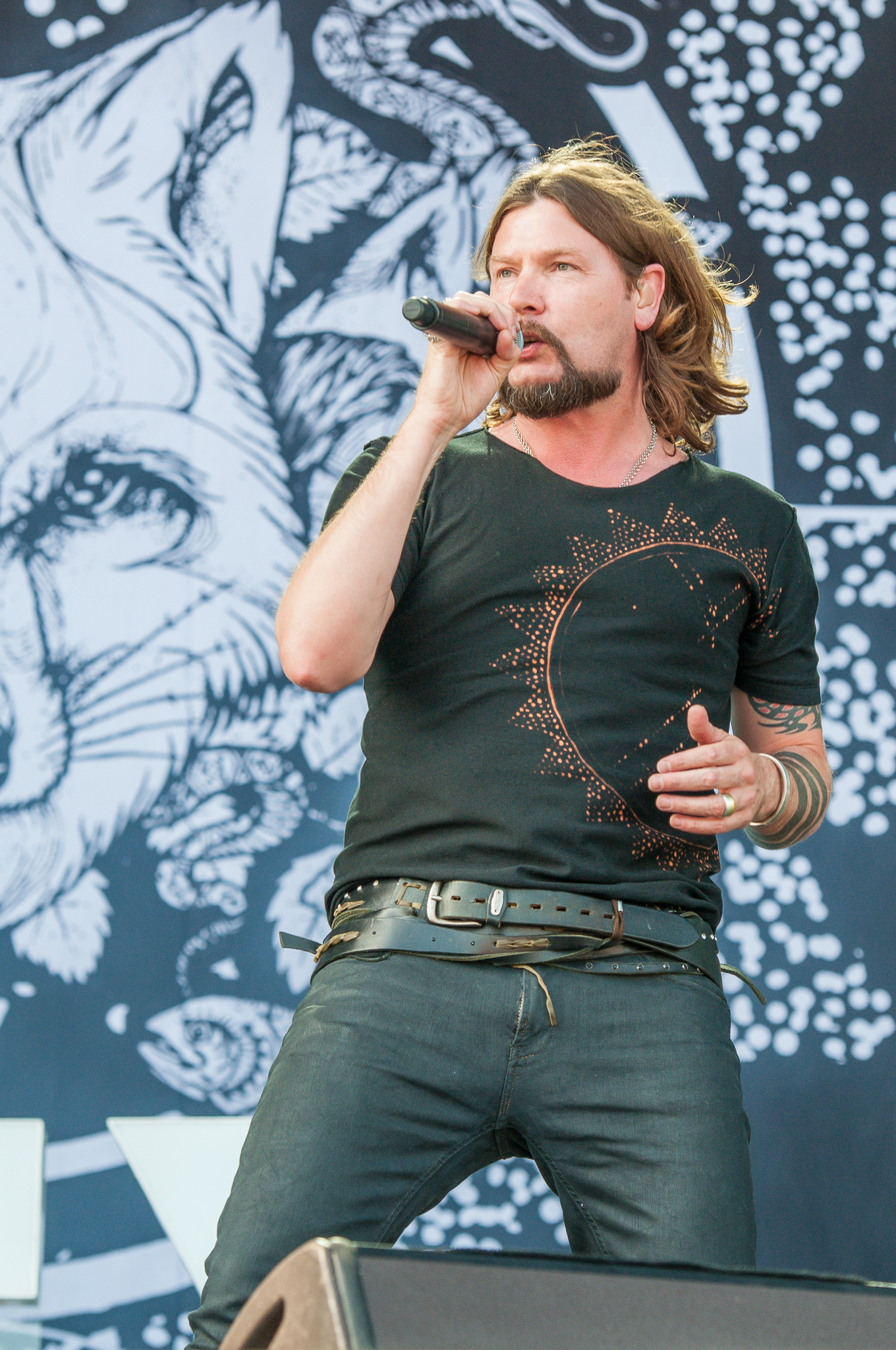
Rea Garvey

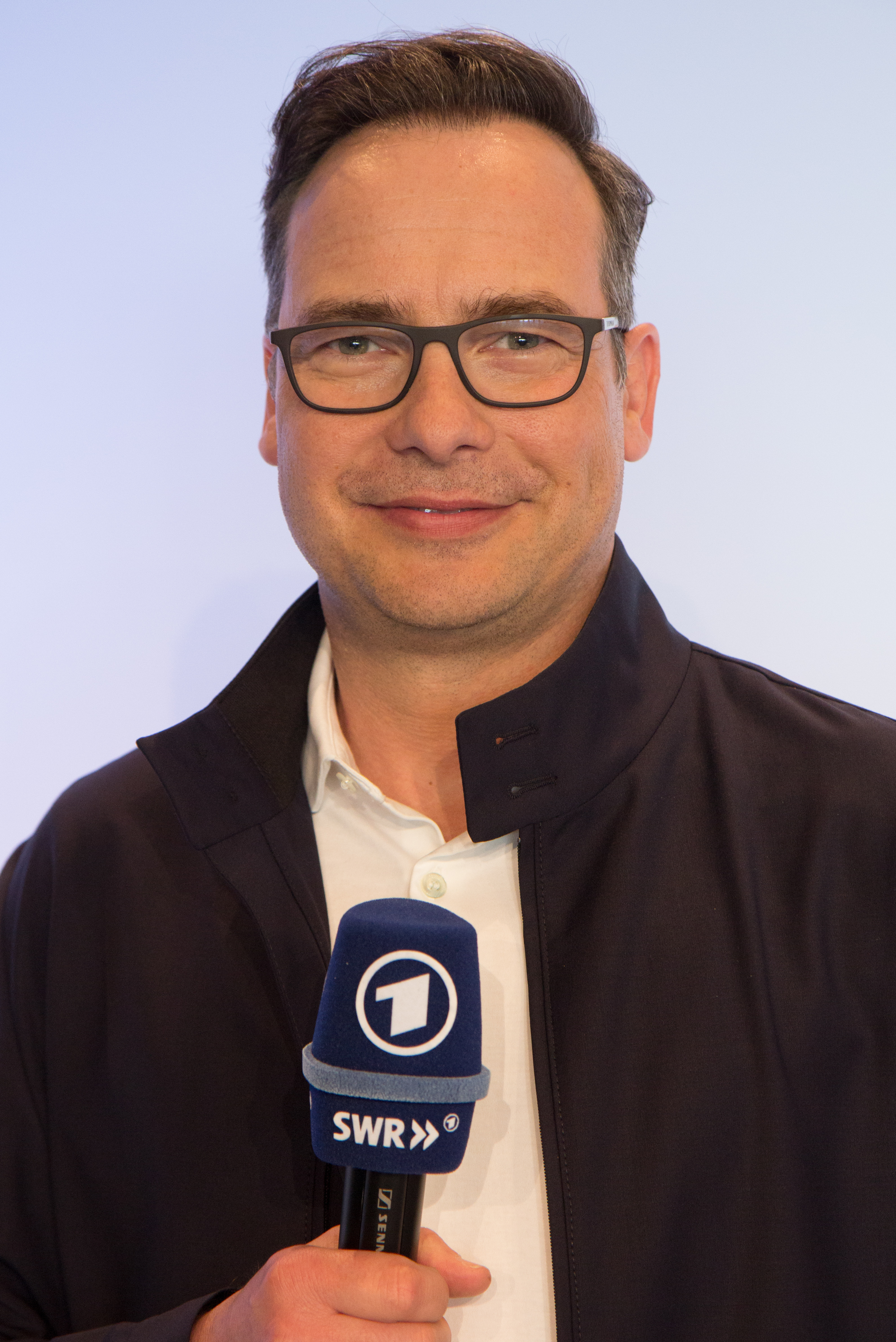
Matthias Opdenhövel

On 24 July 2019, The Masked Singer Germany was renewed for a second season.

Matthias Opdenhövel returned as host. On 25 February 2020, it was announced that the rateteam or panelists would consist of returning TV presenter Ruth Moschner and the new panelist singer Rea Garvey, who was previously a guest panelist in season 1.

As in previous season, a spin-off show named The Masked Singer - red. Special was aired after each live episode, hosted by Viviane Geppert (episodes 1, 3 and 5), Rebecca Mir (episode 2) and Annemarie Carpendale (episode 4 and 6). In the Final Carpendale also hosted the red. - The Masked Singer Countdown, which aired for 15 minutes before the final.

=== Guest panelists ===
Throughout the season, various guest panelists appeared as the third judge in the judging panel for one episode. These guest panelists included:

Season 2 guest panelists

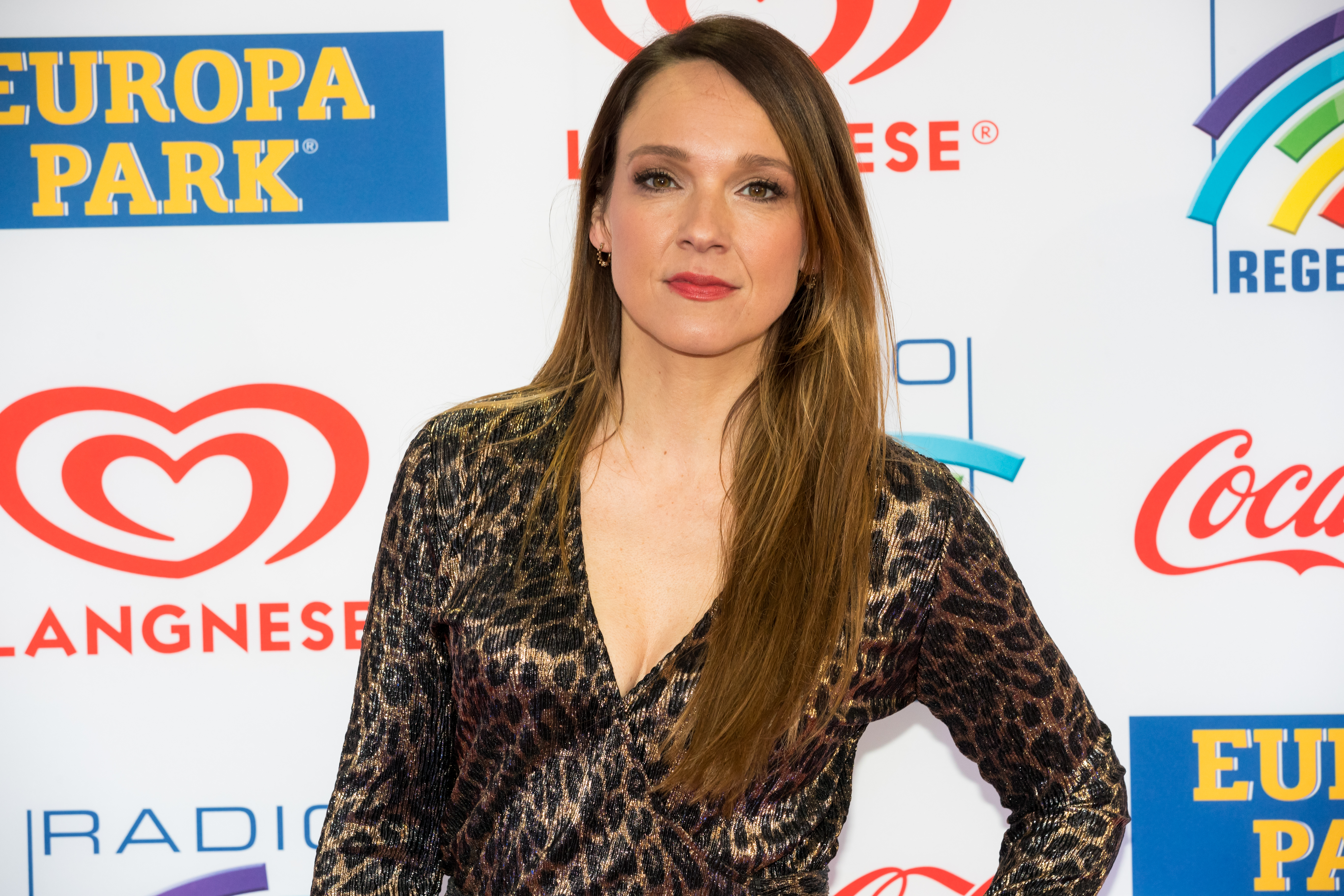
Carolin Kebekus (episode 1)

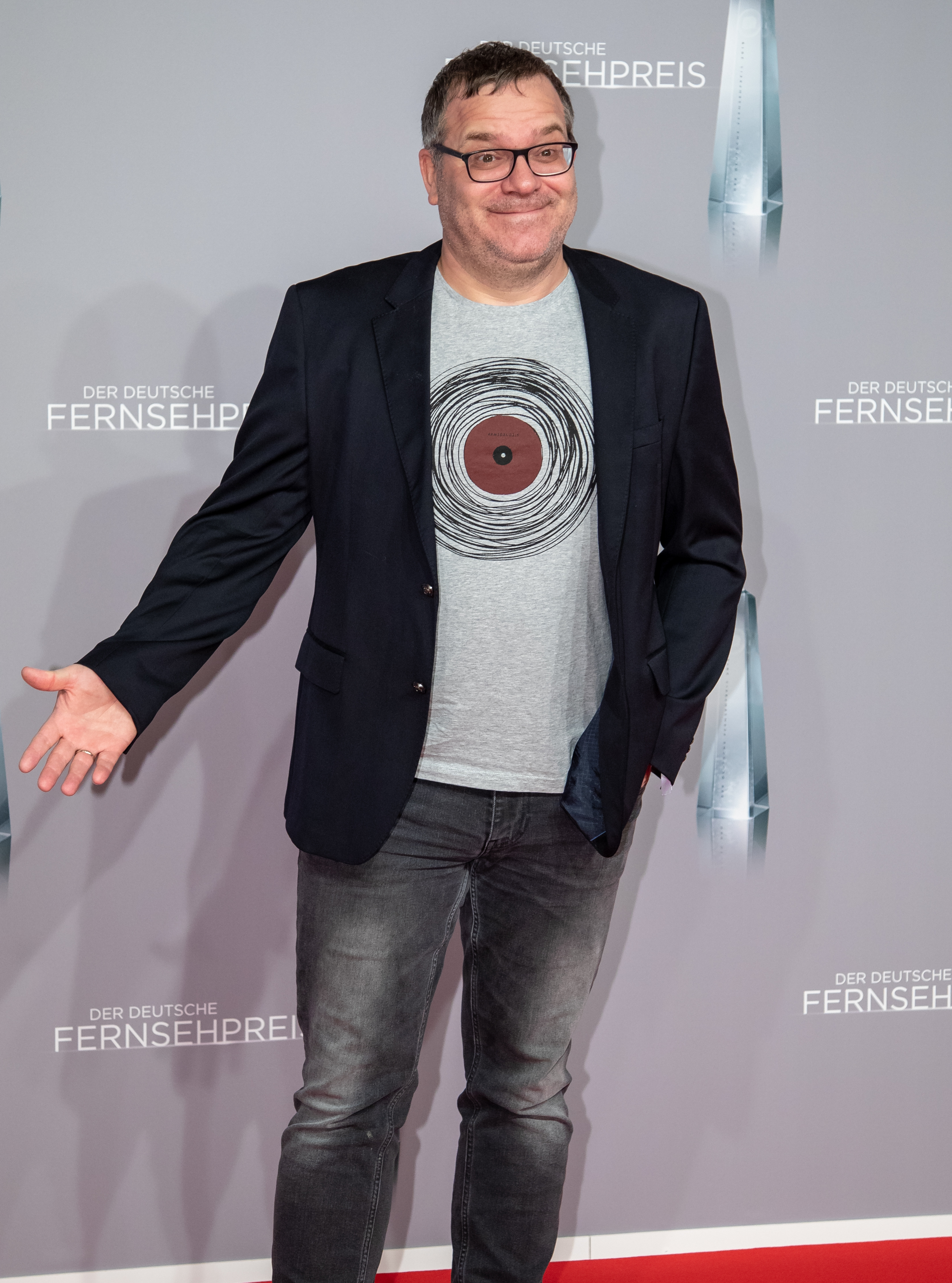
Elton (episode 2)

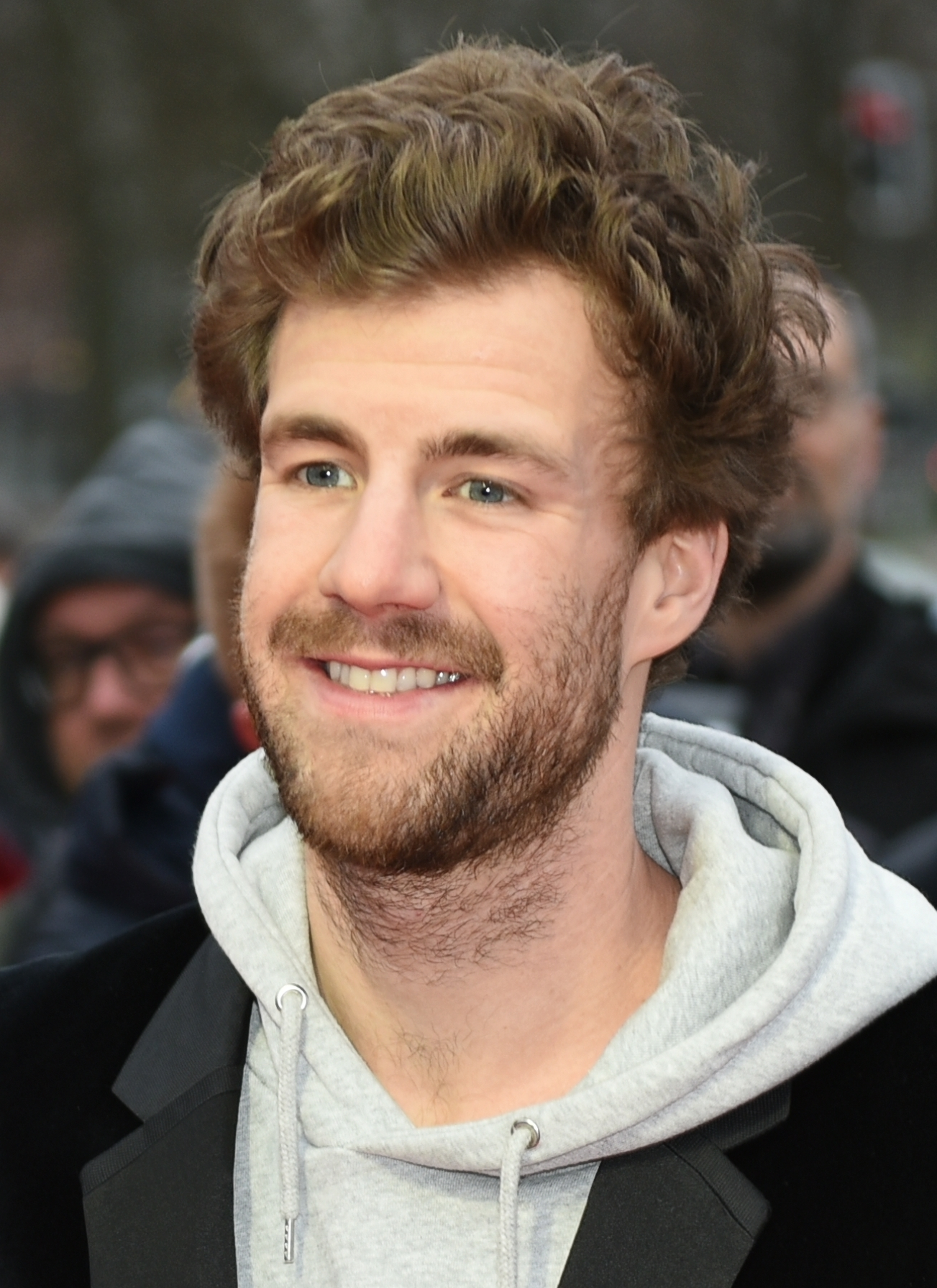
Luke Mockridge (episode 3)

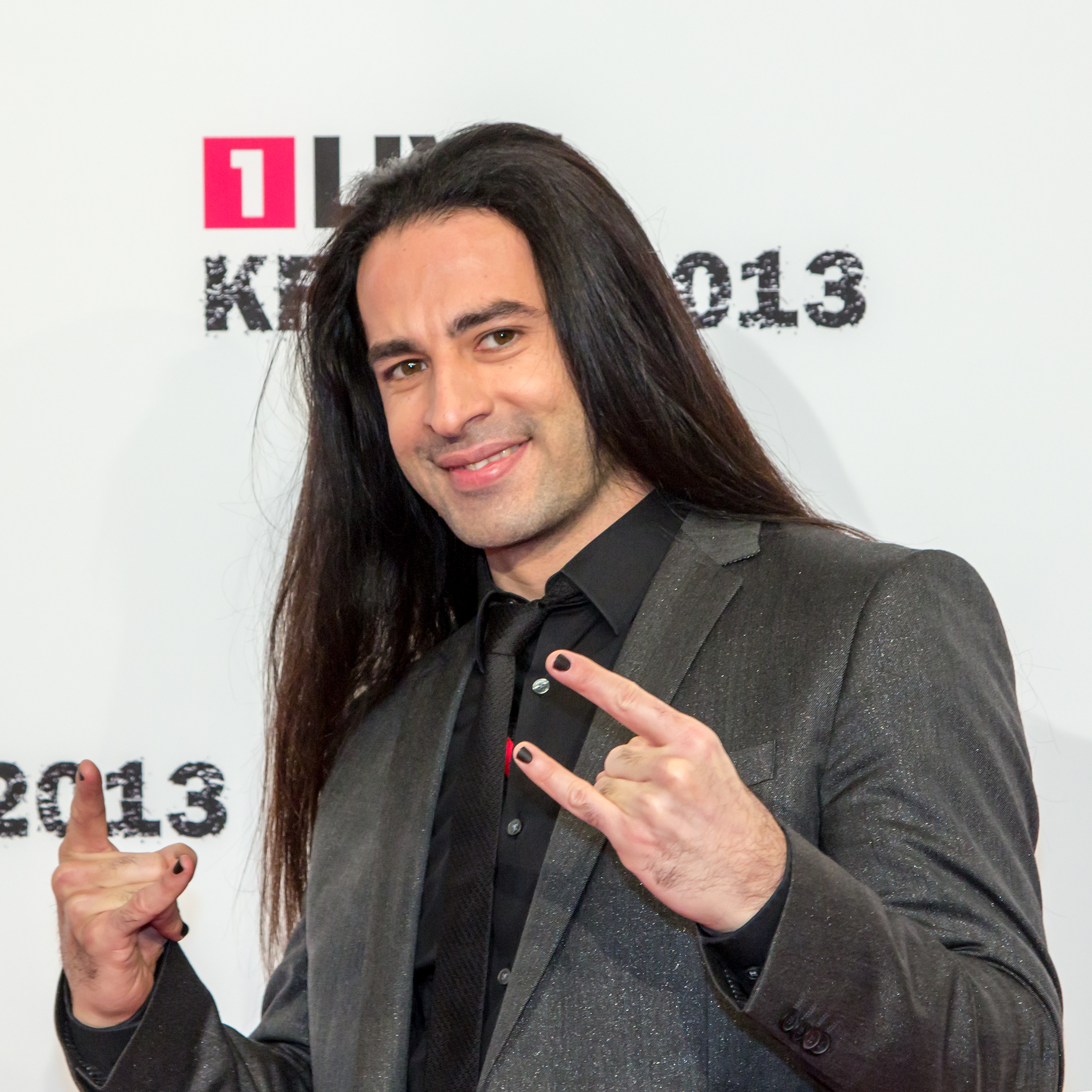
Bülent Ceylan (episode 4)

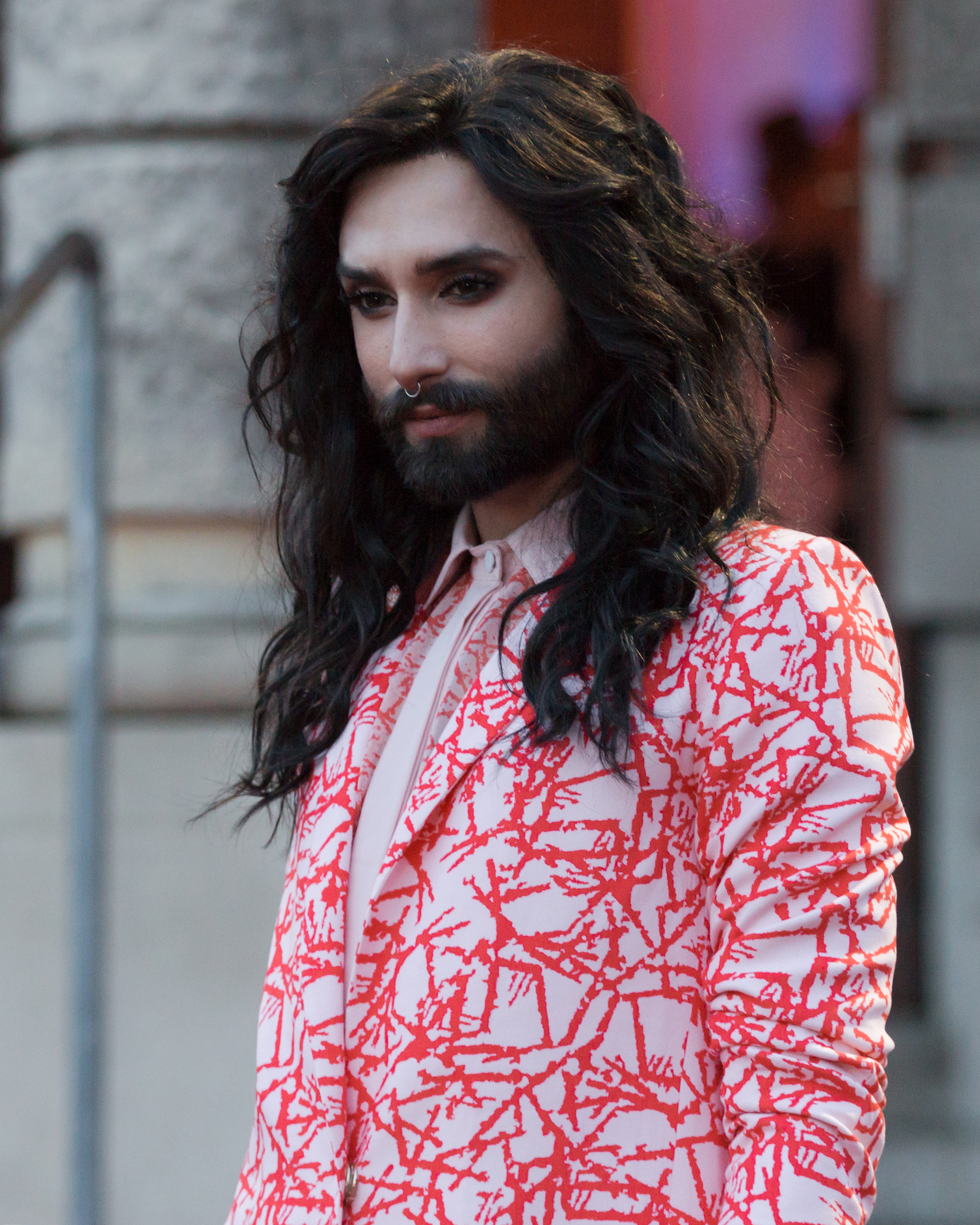
Conchita Wurst (episode 5)

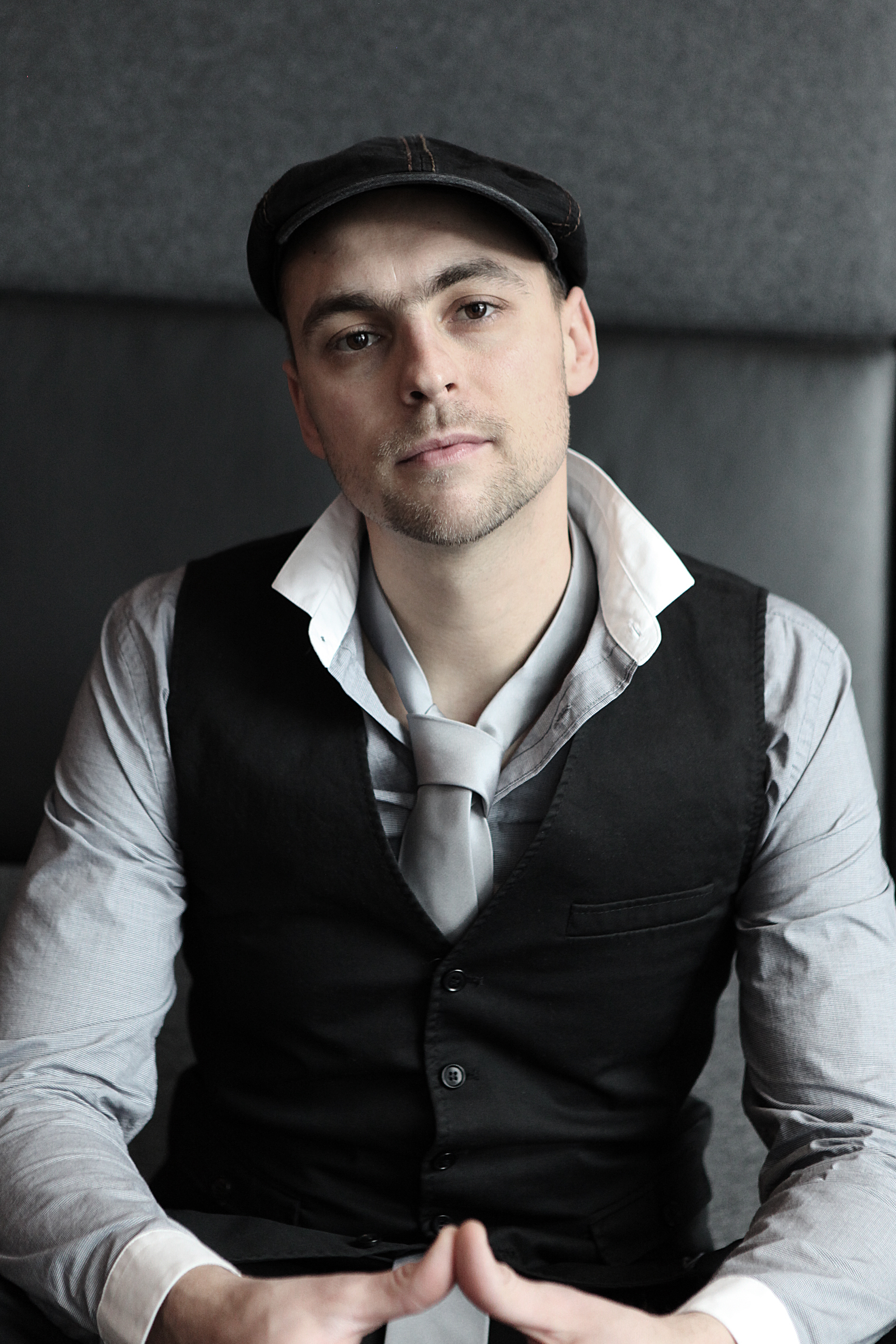
Max Mutzke (episode 6)

Episode	Name	Notability	Ref.
1	Carolin Kebekus	Comedienne	
2	Elton	Presenter	
3	Luke Mockridge	Comedian	
4	Bülent Ceylan	Comedian	
5	Conchita Wurst	Singer	
6	Max Mutzke	Singer	

== Contestants ==
Results
Stage name	Celebrity	Notability	Live Episodes							
Stage name	Celebrity	Notability	1	2	3	4	5	6		
Stage name	Celebrity	Notability	1	2	3	4	5	A	B	C
Faultier "Sloth"	Tom Beck	Actor/Singer	WIN	WIN	WIN	WIN	WIN	SAFE	SAFE	WINNER
Wuschel "Fluffy Ball"	Mike Singer	Singer	WIN	WIN	WIN	RISK	RISK	SAFE	SAFE	RUNNER-UP
Drache "Dragon"	Gregor Meyle	Singer	WIN	WIN	WIN	WIN	WIN	SAFE	THIRD	
Hase "Rabbit"	Sonja Zietlow	Presenter	RISK	RISK	RISK	WIN	RISK	OUT		
Chamäleon "Chameleon"	Dieter Hallervorden	Actor/Comedian	RISK	WIN	RISK	RISK	OUT			
Roboter "Robot"	Caroline Beil	Actress	RISK	WIN	WIN	OUT				
Göttin "Goddess"	Rebecca Immanuel	Actress	WIN	RISK	OUT					
Kakerlake "Cockroach"	Angelo Kelly	Singer	WIN	RISK	WD (Note: Left voluntarily due to the coronavirus pandemic.)					
Fledermaus "Bat"	Franziska Knuppe	Model	RISK	OUT						
Dalmatiner "Dalmatian"	Stefanie Heinzmann	Singer	OUT							

The masked singer won their face-off and remained in the competition.
The masked singer lost their face-off and was in the bottom three/two, but was not eliminated.
The masked singer was safe from elimination.
The masked singer was eliminated from the competition and unmasked upon their elimination.
The masked singer chose to quit the competition and unmasked upon their elimination.
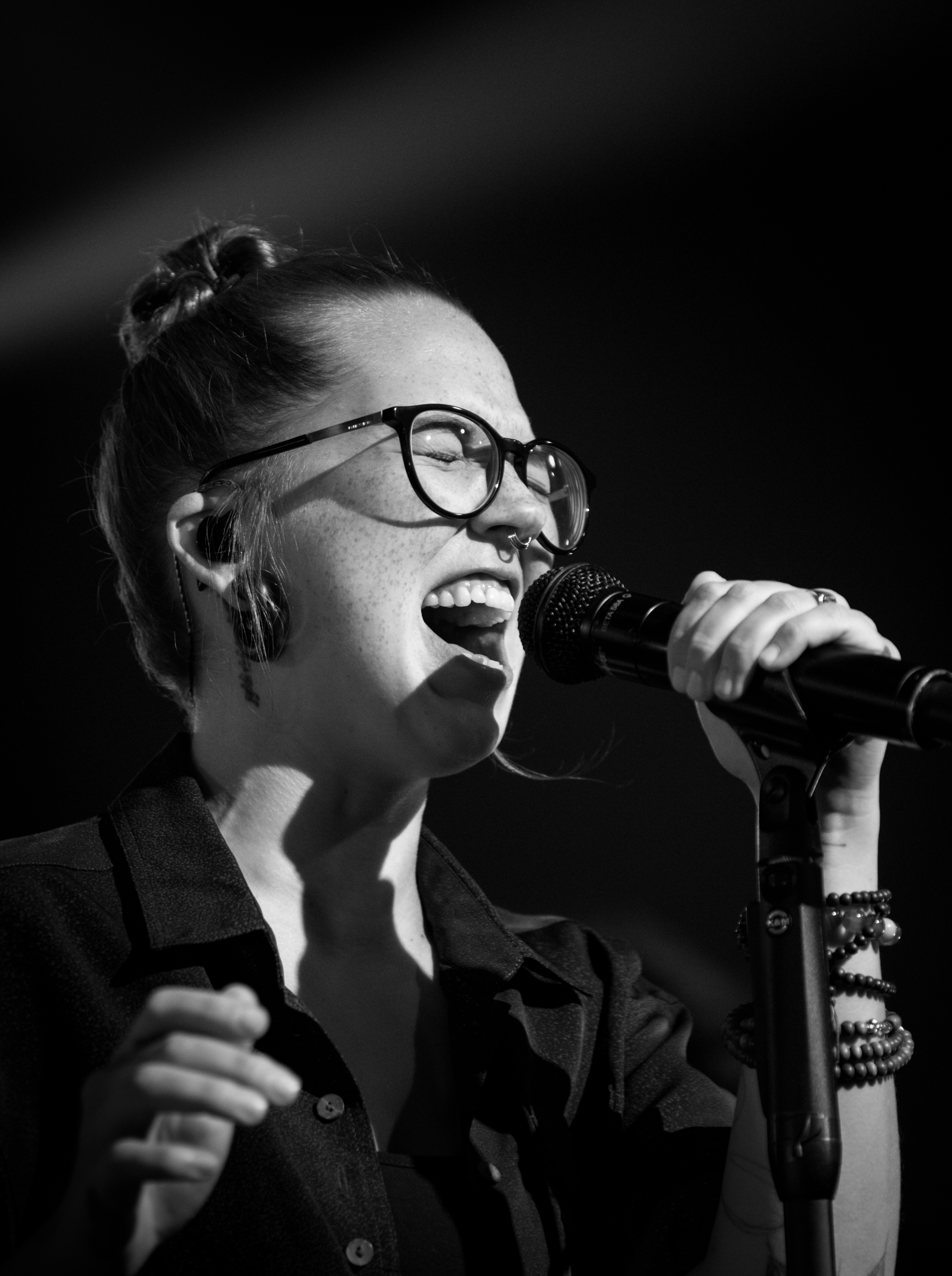
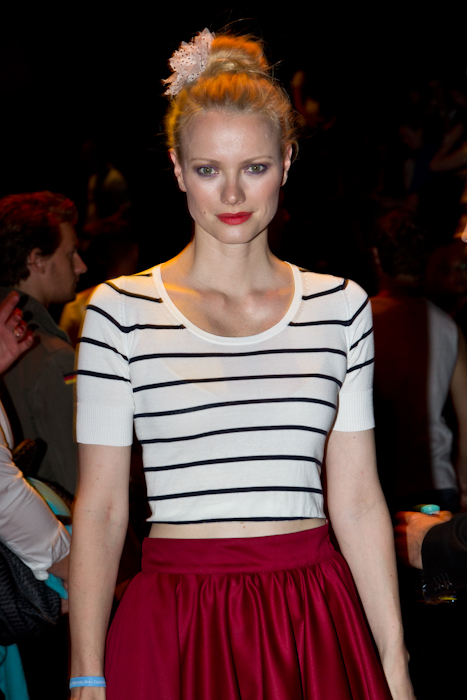
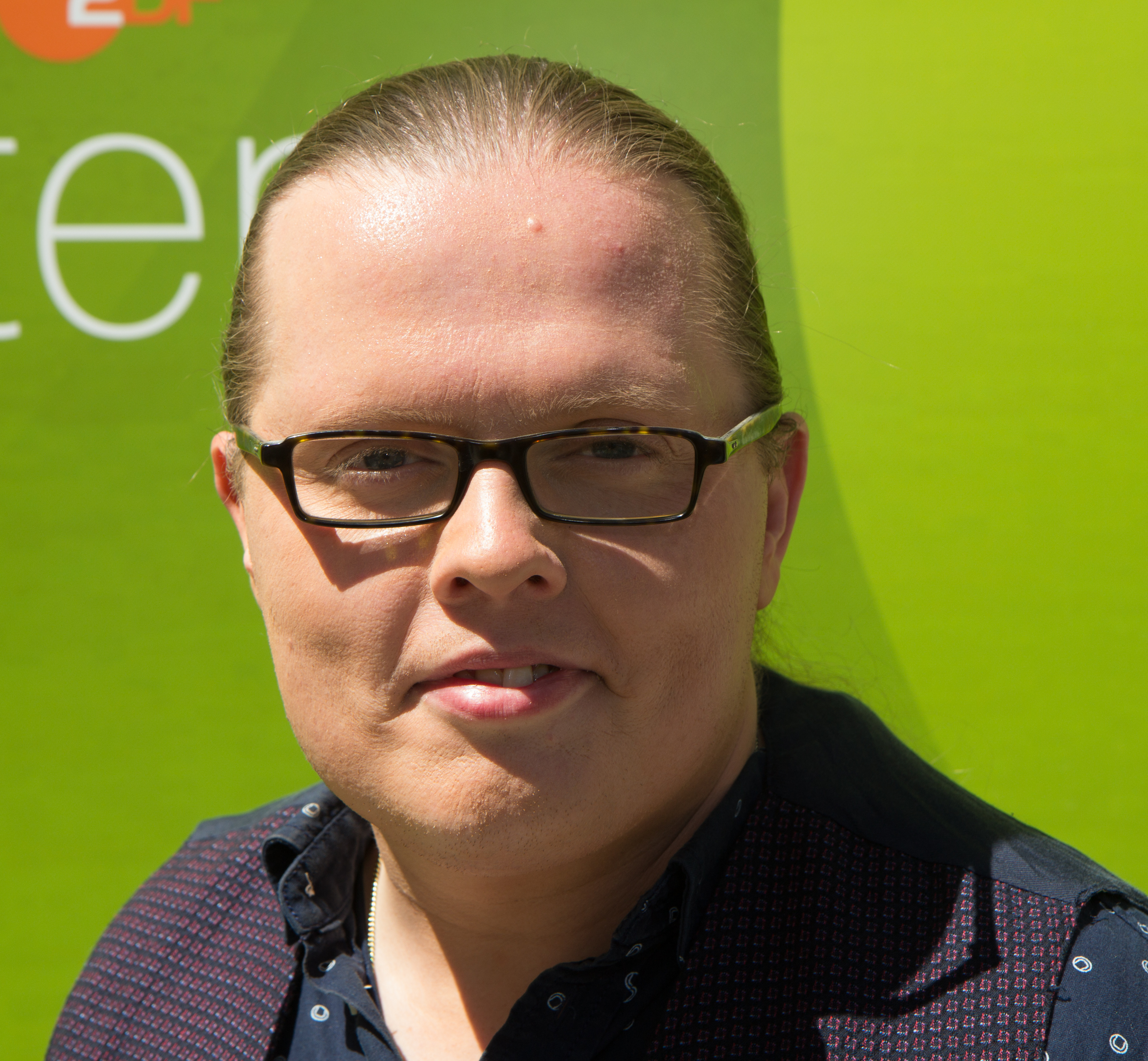
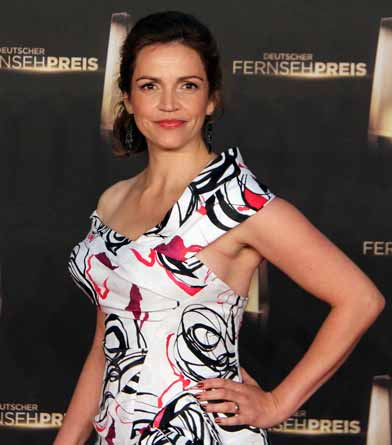
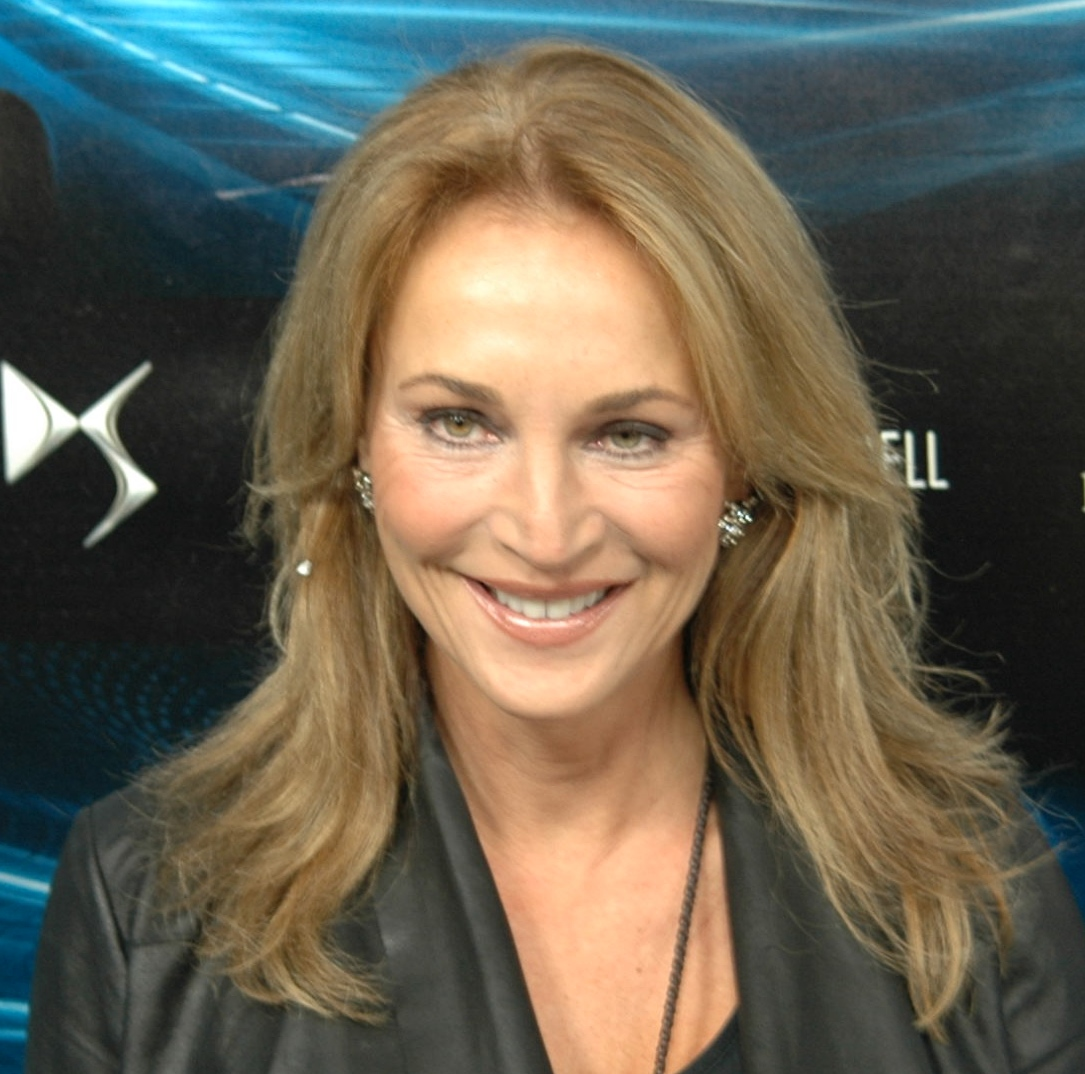
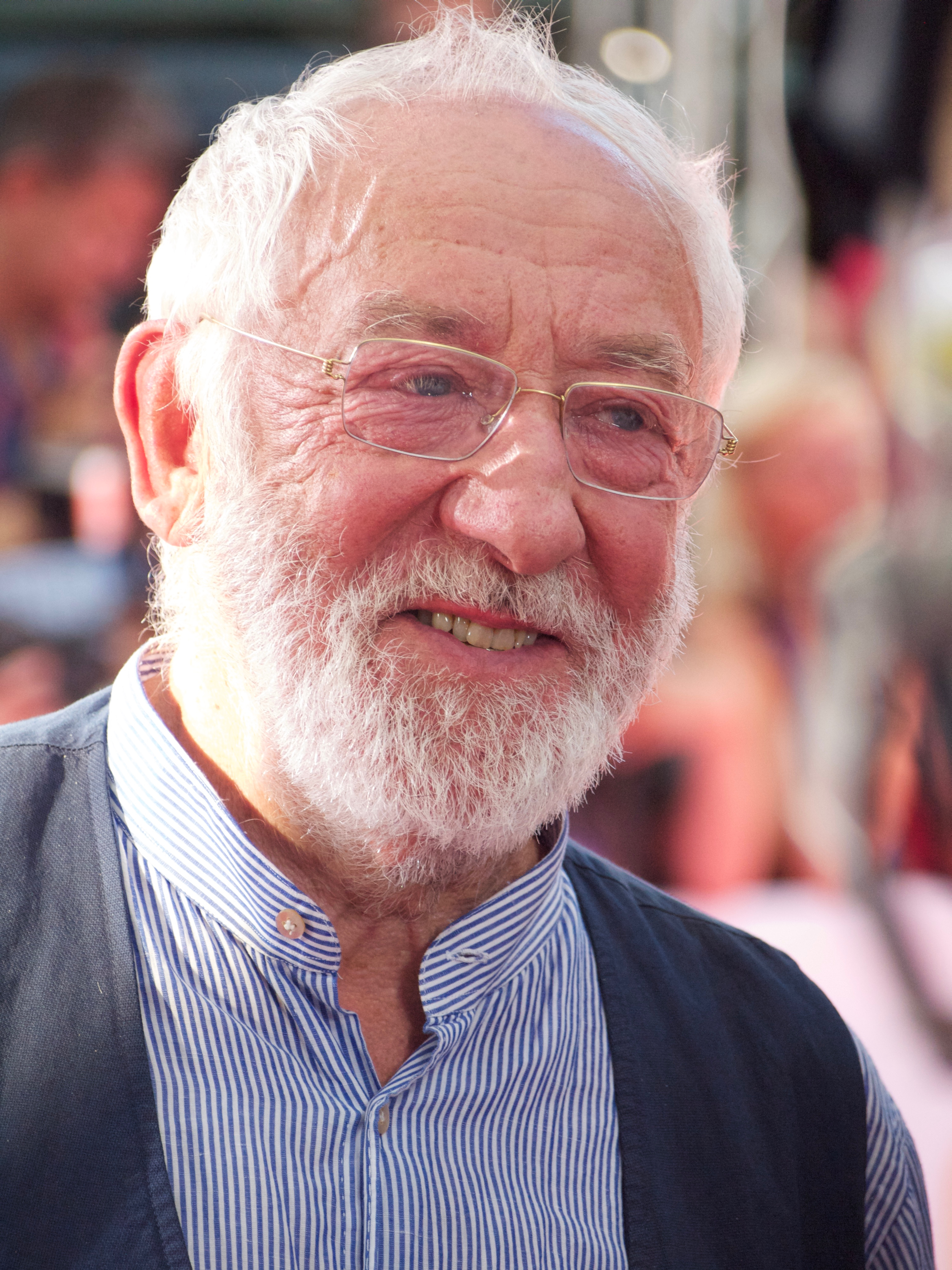
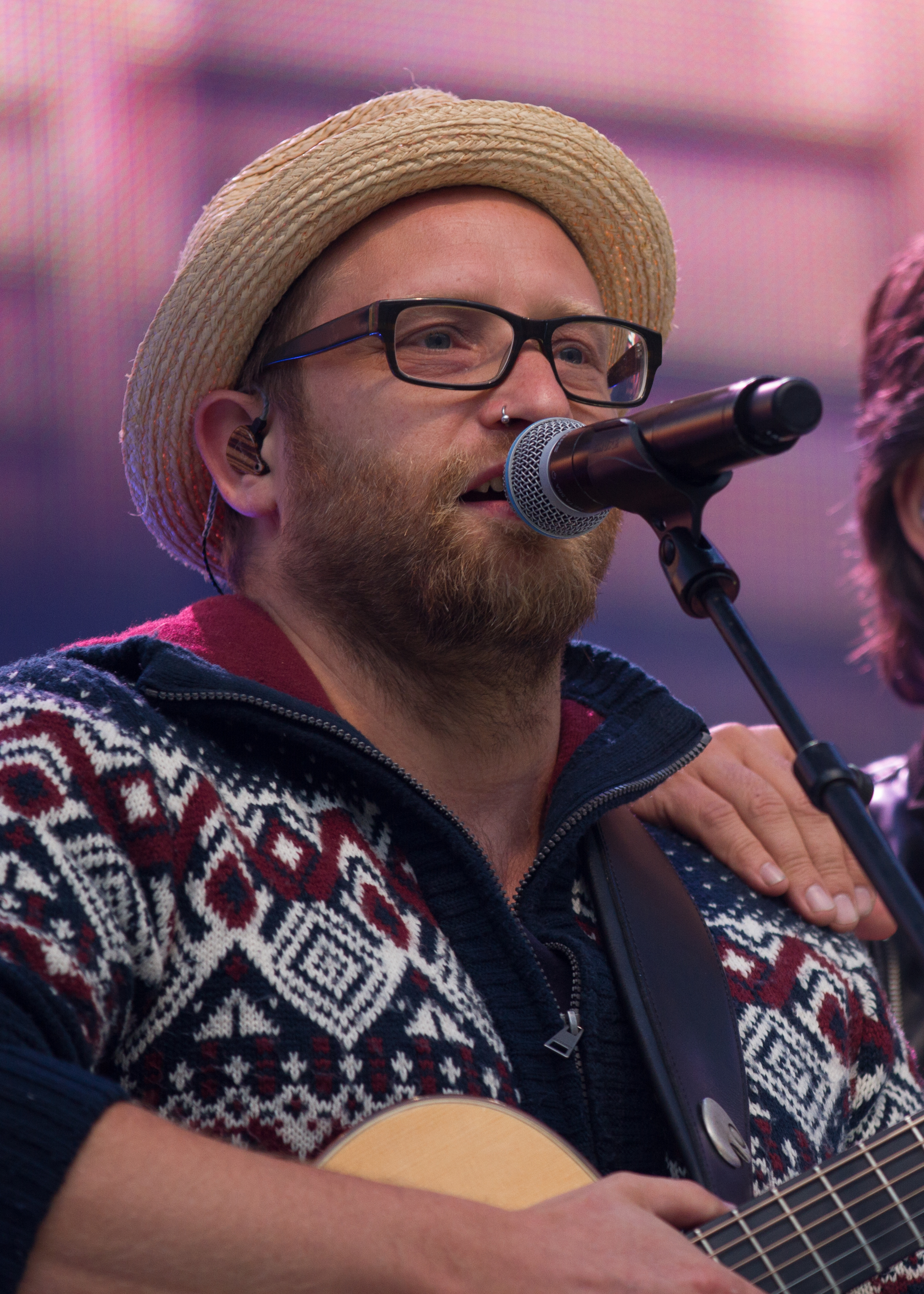
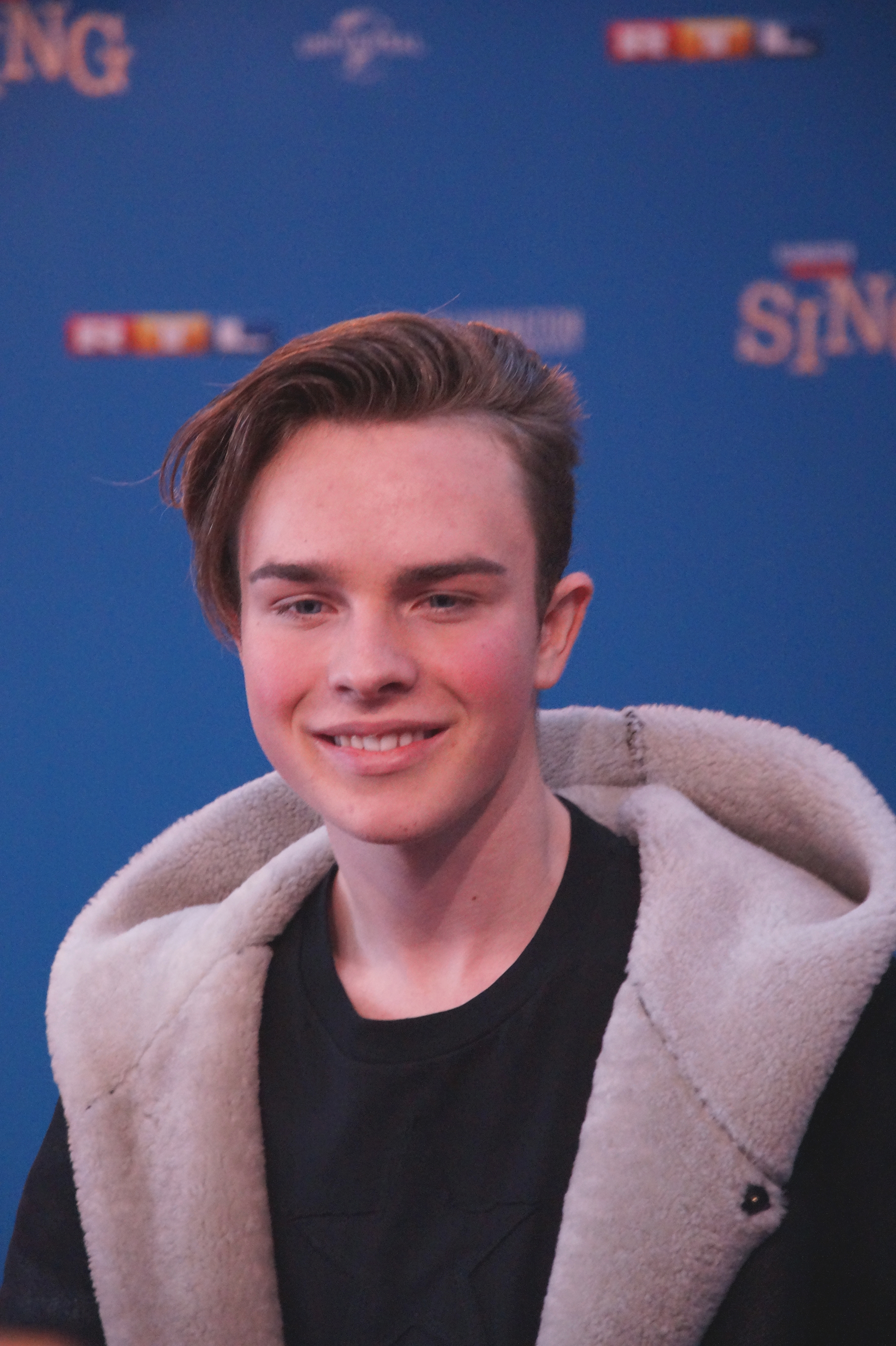
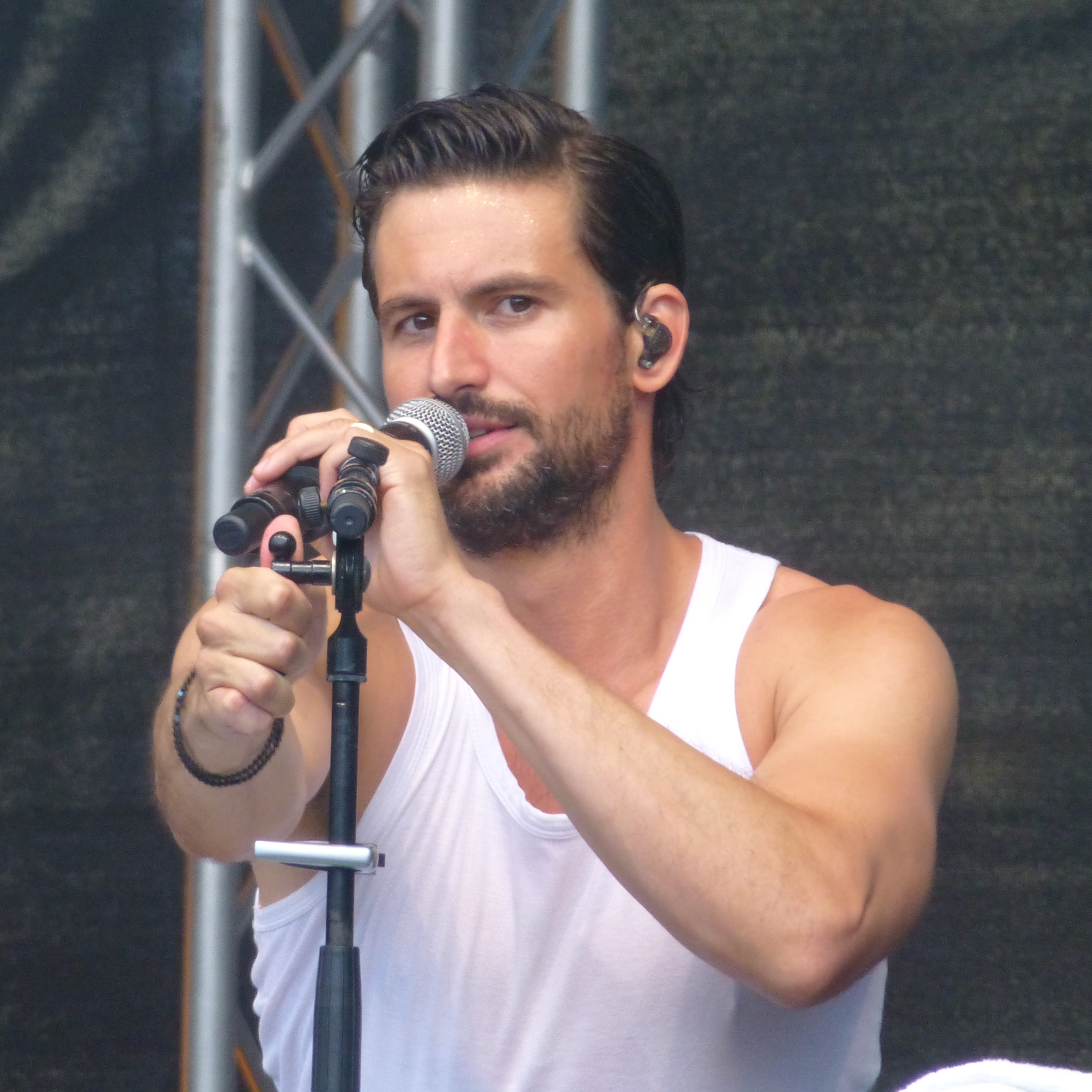
The celebrities who competed in the second season of The Masked Singer, pictured in order of elimination (l-r):

Stefanie Heinzmann ("Dalmatiner"), Franziska Knuppe ("Fledermaus"), Angelo Kelly ("Kakerlake"), Rebecca Immanuel ("Göttin"), Caroline Beil ("Roboter"), Dieter Hallervorden ("Chamäleon"), Gregor Meyle ("Drache"), Mike Singer ("Wuschel"), Tom Beck ("Faultier")

Not pictured: Sonja Zietlow ("Hase")

== Episodes ==
=== Week 1 (10 March) ===
Performances on the first live episode
#	Stage name	Song	Identity	Result
1	Roboter	"Libiamo ne' lieti calici" from La traviata / "Harder, Better, Faster, Stronger" by Daft Punk	undisclosed	RISK
2	Wuschel	"Crazy" by Gnarls Barkley	undisclosed	WIN
3	Kakerlake	"Gangsta's Paradise" by Coolio	undisclosed	WIN
4	Hase	"A Night like This" by Caro Emerald	undisclosed	RISK
5	Faultier	"Mr Boombastic" by Shaggy	undisclosed	WIN
6	Dalmatiner	"Diamonds Are A Girl's Best Friend" by Marilyn Monroe	Stefanie Heinzmann	OUT
7	Fledermaus	"Bad Guy" by Billie Eilish	undisclosed	RISK
8	Göttin	"Stairway to Heaven" by Led Zeppelin	undisclosed	WIN
9	Chamäleon	"Dance Monkey" by Tones and I	undisclosed	RISK
10	Drache	"Frozen" by Madonna	undisclosed	WIN

=== Week 2 (17 March) ===
Performances on the second live episode
#	Stage name	Song	Identity	Result
1	Kakerlake	"California Love" by 2Pac feat. Dr. Dre/"Hey Ya!" by Outkast	undisclosed	RISK
2	Faultier	"Kiss" by Prince	undisclosed	WIN
3	Chamäleon	"Bella Ciao" by Maître Gims	undisclosed	WIN
4	Göttin	"Rise Like a Phoenix" by Conchita Wurst	undisclosed	RISK
5	Wuschel	"Blinding Lights" by The Weeknd	undisclosed	WIN
6	Fledermaus	"Beat It"/"Bad" by Michael Jackson	Franziska Knuppe	OUT
7	Drache	"Black Hole Sun" by Soundgarden	undisclosed	WIN
8	Hase	"Dear Future Husband" by Meghan Trainor	undisclosed	RISK
9	Roboter	"Underneath" by Adam Lambert	undisclosed	WIN

=== Week 3 (24 March) ===
Performances on the third live episode
#	Stage name	Song	Identity	Result
1	Wuschel	"Can't Stop the Feeling!" by Justin Timberlake	undisclosed	WIN
2	Hase	"I Wanna Be Loved By You" by Marilyn Monroe	undisclosed	RISK
3	Roboter	"The Winner Takes It All" by ABBA	undisclosed	WIN
4	Göttin	"Juice" by Lizzo	Rebecca Immanuel	OUT
5	Chamäleon	"Ring of Fire" by Johnny Cash	undisclosed	RISK
6	Drache	"Set Fire to the Rain" by Adele	undisclosed	WIN
7	Faultier	"Volare" by Domenico Modugno	undisclosed	WIN

=== Week 4 (14 April) ===
Performances on the fourth live episode
#	Stage name	Song	Result	
1	Roboter	"Titanium" by David Guetta feat. Sia	RISK	
2	Hase	"Big Spender" by Shirley Bassey	WIN	
3	Drache	"Somewhere Only We Know" by Keane	WIN	
4	Wuschel	"Maniac" by Michael Sembello	RISK	
5	Chamäleon	"Azzurro" by Adriano Celentano	RISK	
6	Faultier	"Lemon Tree" by Fool's Garden	WIN	
Sing-off details			Identity	Result
1	Roboter	"Arcade" by Duncan Laurence	Caroline Beil	OUT
2	Wuschel	"Naked" by James Arthur	undisclosed	SAFE
3	Chamäleon	"Daddy Cool" by Boney M.	undisclosed	SAFE

=== Week 5 (21 April) – Semi-final ===
Performances on the fifth live episode
#	Stage name	Song	Result	
1	Chamäleon	"D.I.S.C.O." by Ottawan	RISK	
2	Drache	"Beautiful" by Christina Aguilera	WIN	
3	Wuschel	"Valerie" by Mark Ronson and Amy Winehouse	RISK	
4	Hase	"The Shoop Shoop Song (It's in His Kiss)" by Cher	RISK	
5	Faultier	"See You Again" by Wiz Khalifa feat. Charlie Puth	WIN	
Sing-off details			Identity	Result
1	Chamäleon	"Blame It on the Boogie" by The Jacksons	Dieter Hallervorden	OUT
2	Wuschel	"Treat You Better" by Shawn Mendes	undisclosed	SAFE
3	Hase	"(They Long to Be) Close to You" by The Carpenters	undisclosed	SAFE

=== Week 6 (28 April) – Final ===
- Group number: "The Greatest Show" by Hugh Jackman, Keala Settle, Zac Efron and Zendaya

==== Round One ====
Performances on the final live episode – round one
#	Stage name	Song	Identity	Result
1	Hase	"Great Balls of Fire" by Jerry Lee Lewis	Sonja Zietlow	OUT
2	Drache	"Wonderful Life" by Black	undisclosed	SAFE
3	Faultier	"The Lazy Song" by Bruno Mars	undisclosed	SAFE
4	Wuschel	"My Way" by Frank Sinatra	undisclosed	SAFE

==== Round Two ====
Performances on the final live episode – round two
#	Stage name	Song	Identity	Result
1	Drache	"You Know My Name" by Chris Cornell	Gregor Meyle	THIRD
2	Wuschel	"Durch den Monsun" by Tokio Hotel	undisclosed	SAFE
3	Faultier	"Say You Won't Let Go" by James Arthur	undisclosed	SAFE

==== Round Three ====
Performances on the final live episode – round three
#	Stage name	Song	Identity	Result
1	Wuschel	"Naked" by James Arthur	Mike Singer	RUNNER-UP
2	Faultier	"Kiss" by Prince	Tom Beck	WINNER

== Reception ==
=== Ratings ===
Episode	Original airdate	Timeslot	Viewers (in millions)		Share (in %)		Source
Episode	Original airdate	Timeslot	Household	Adults 14-49	Household	Adults 14-49	Source
1	10 March 2020	Tuesdays 8:15 pm	3.32	2.18	12.0	25.3	
2	17 March 2020	Tuesdays 8:15 pm	4.13	2.65	13.1	26.9	
3	24 March 2020	Tuesdays 8:15 pm	4.26	2.68	12.9	26.2	
4	14 April 2020	Tuesdays 8:15 pm	3.88	2.45	12.1	24.6	
5	21 April 2020	Tuesdays 8:15 pm	3.94	2.46	12.5	25.9	
6	28 April 2020	Tuesdays 8:15 pm	5.34	3.38	19.1	36.9	
Average			4.15	2.63	13.6	27.6	
