= The Masked Singer (German TV series) season 3 =

The Masked Singer
- Season 3
- Starring: Bülent Ceylan; Sonja Zietlow; Various guests
- Hosted by: Matthias Opdenhövel
- No. of contestants: 10+1
- Winner: Sarah Lombardi as "Skelett"
- Runner-up: Alec Völkel as "Alien"
- No. of episodes: 6

Release
- Original network: ProSieben
- Original release: 20 October – 24 November 2020

Season chronology
- ← Previous; Season 2 Next → Season 4

The third season of the German singing competition The Masked Singer premiered on 20 October 2020 on ProSieben. This season the panel were Bülent Ceylan and Sonja Zietlow, replacing Ruth Moschner and Rea Garvey. Matthias Opdenhövel also returned as host.

On 24 November 2020, the Skelett (singer Sarah Lombardi) was declared the winner and the Alien (musician Alec Völkel) was the runner-up.

== Panelists and host ==
Season 3 panelists and host

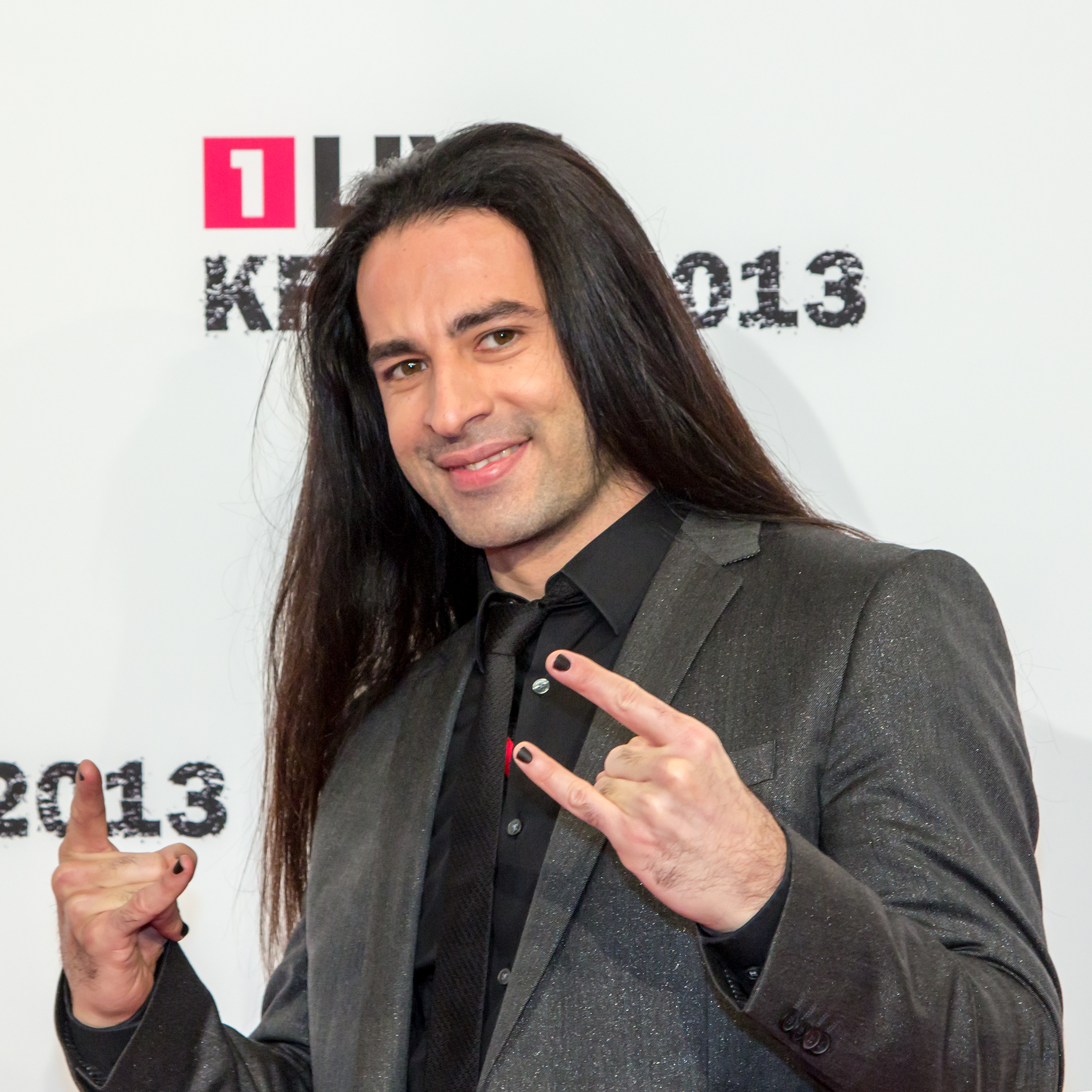
Bülent Ceylan

Sonja Zietlow

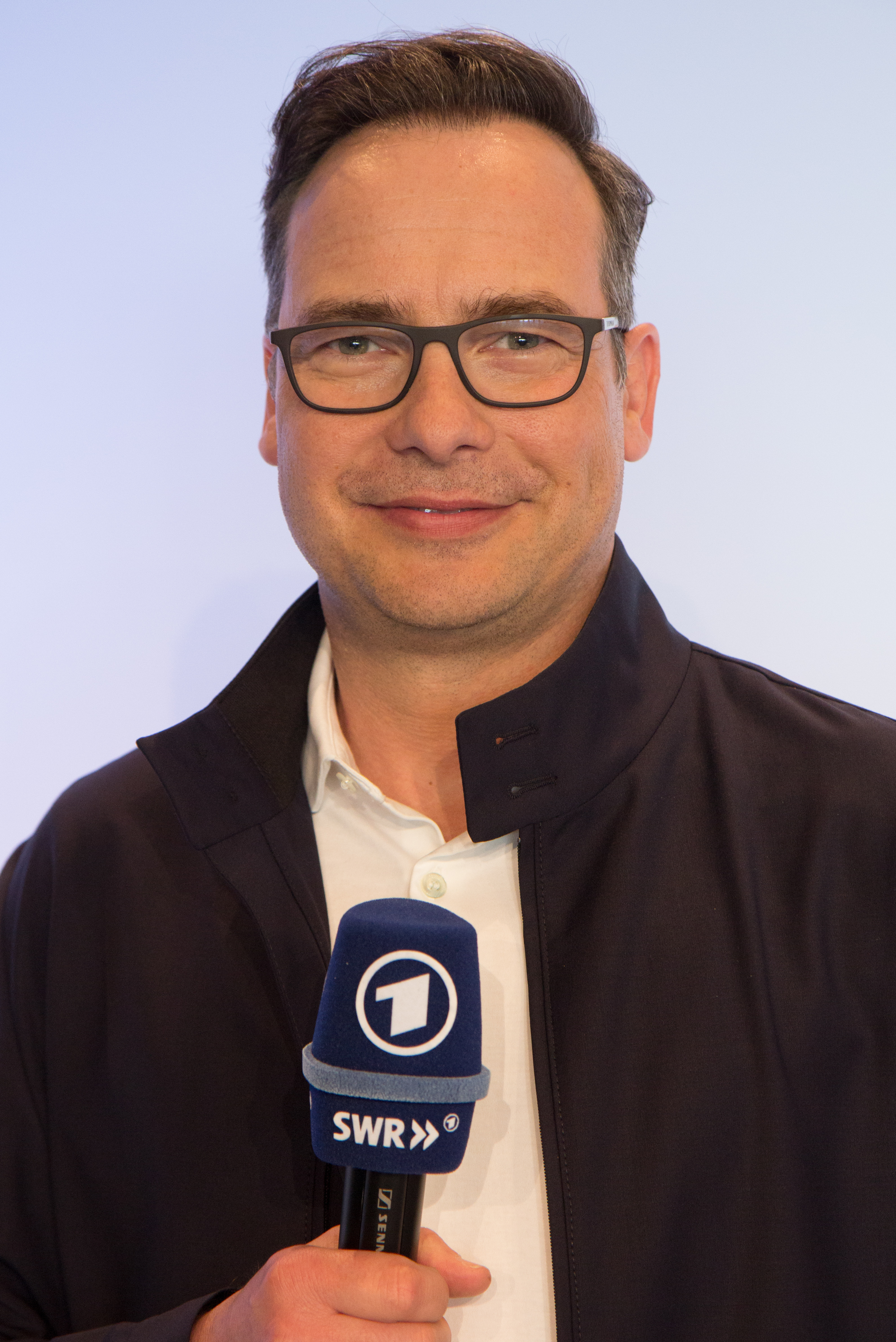
Matthias Opdenhövel

On 24 April 2020, ProSieben announced the third season.

Matthias Opdenhövel returned as host. In August 2020, it was announced that Ruth Moschner and Rea Garvey would not be returning in the panel for this season, but they would be returning in the fourth season, which aired in 2021. On 15 September 2020, ProSieben announced that contestants from season one Bülent Ceylan and from season two Sonja Zietlow would be in the panel.

As in previous seasons, a spin-off show named The Masked Singer - red. Special was aired after each live episode, hosted by Viviane Geppert (episodes 1 and 3) and Annemarie Carpendale (episode 2, 4 and 6). On 16 November 2020, the episode wasn't played, because the live episode was played Monday. In the Final Carpendale hosted also, the red. - The Masked Singer Countdown, which aired for 15 minutes before the final.

=== Guest panelists ===
Also this season, various guest panelists appeared as the third judge in the judging panel for one episode. These guest panelists included:

Season 3 guest panelists

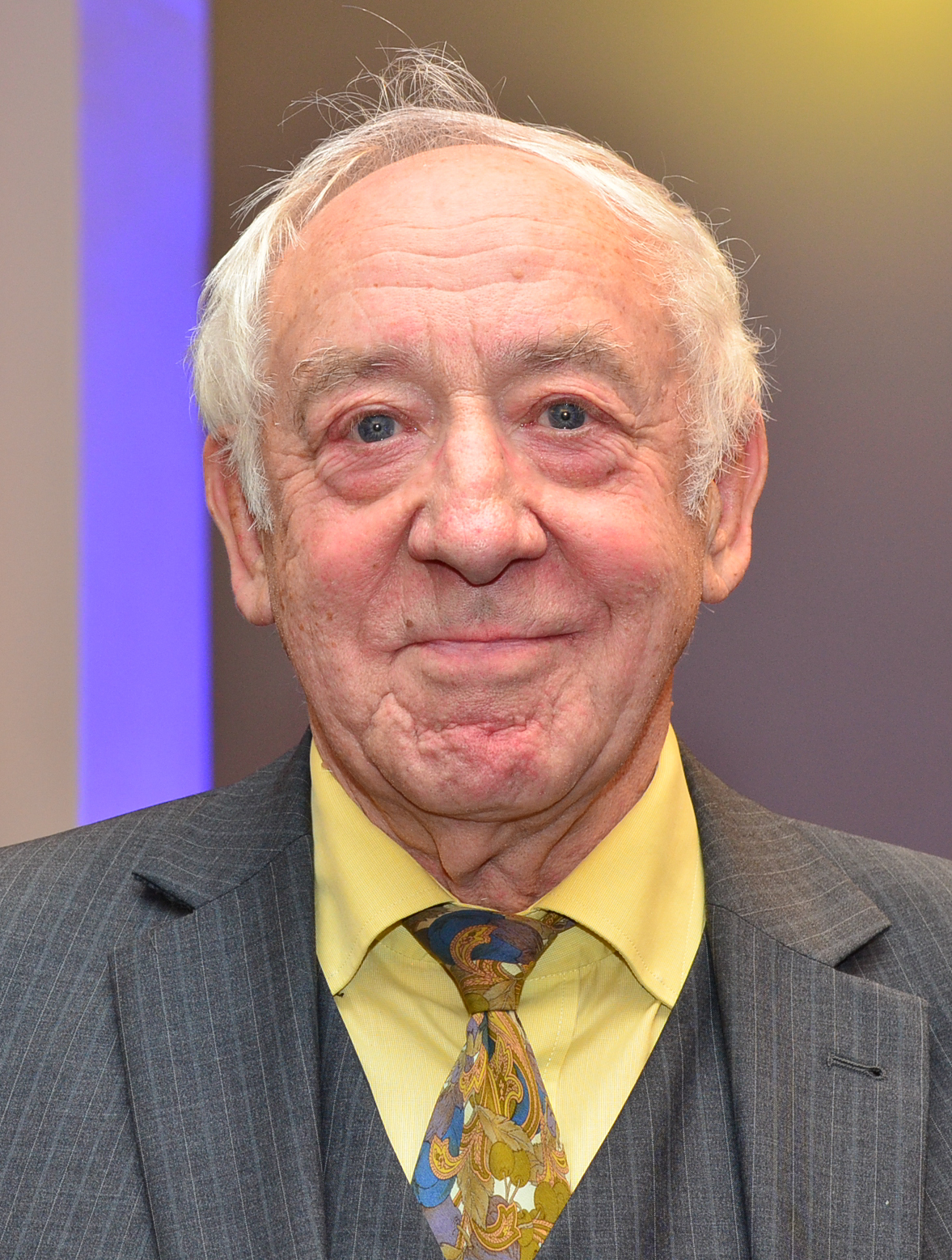
Dieter Hallervorden (episode 1)

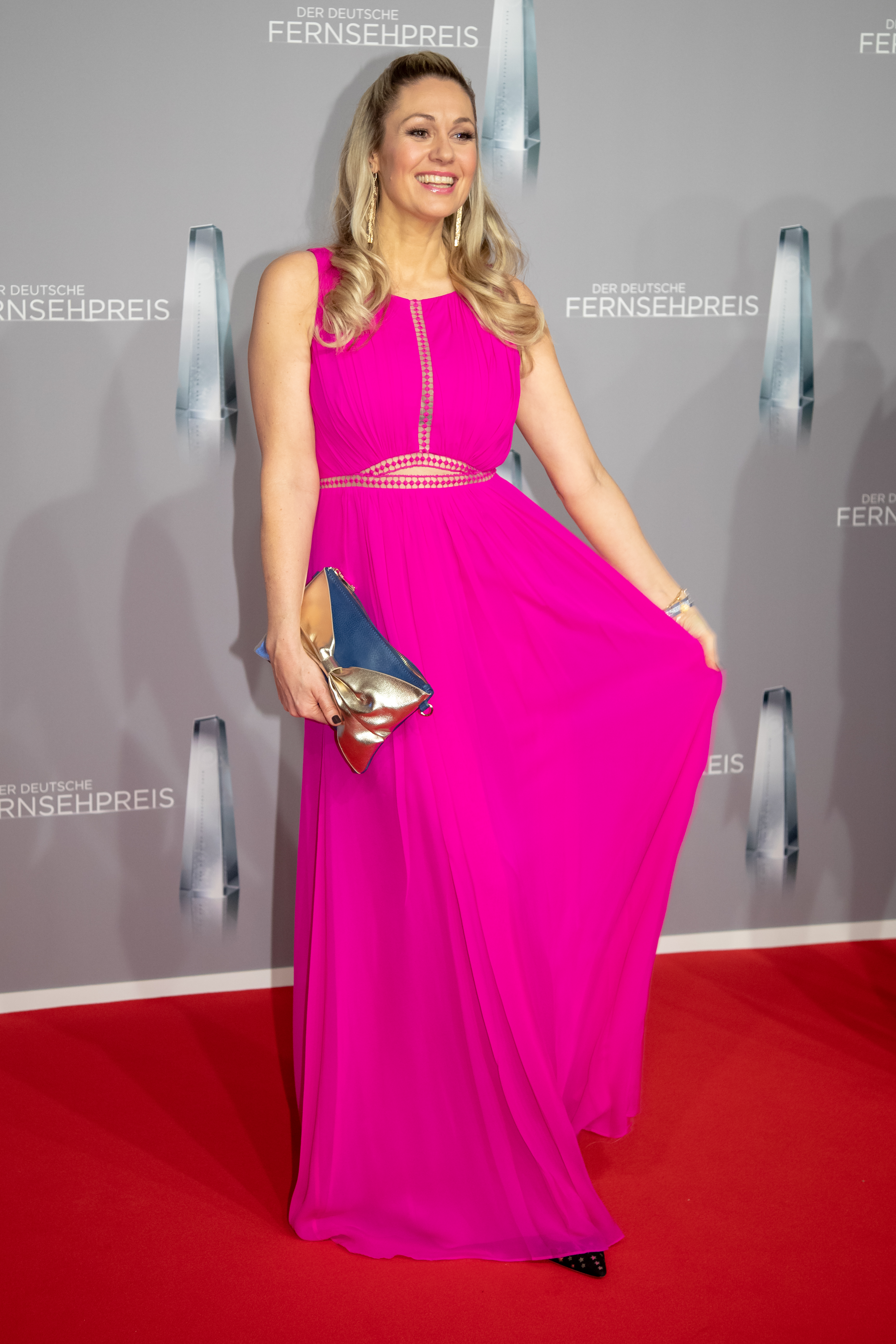
Ruth Moschner (episode 2)

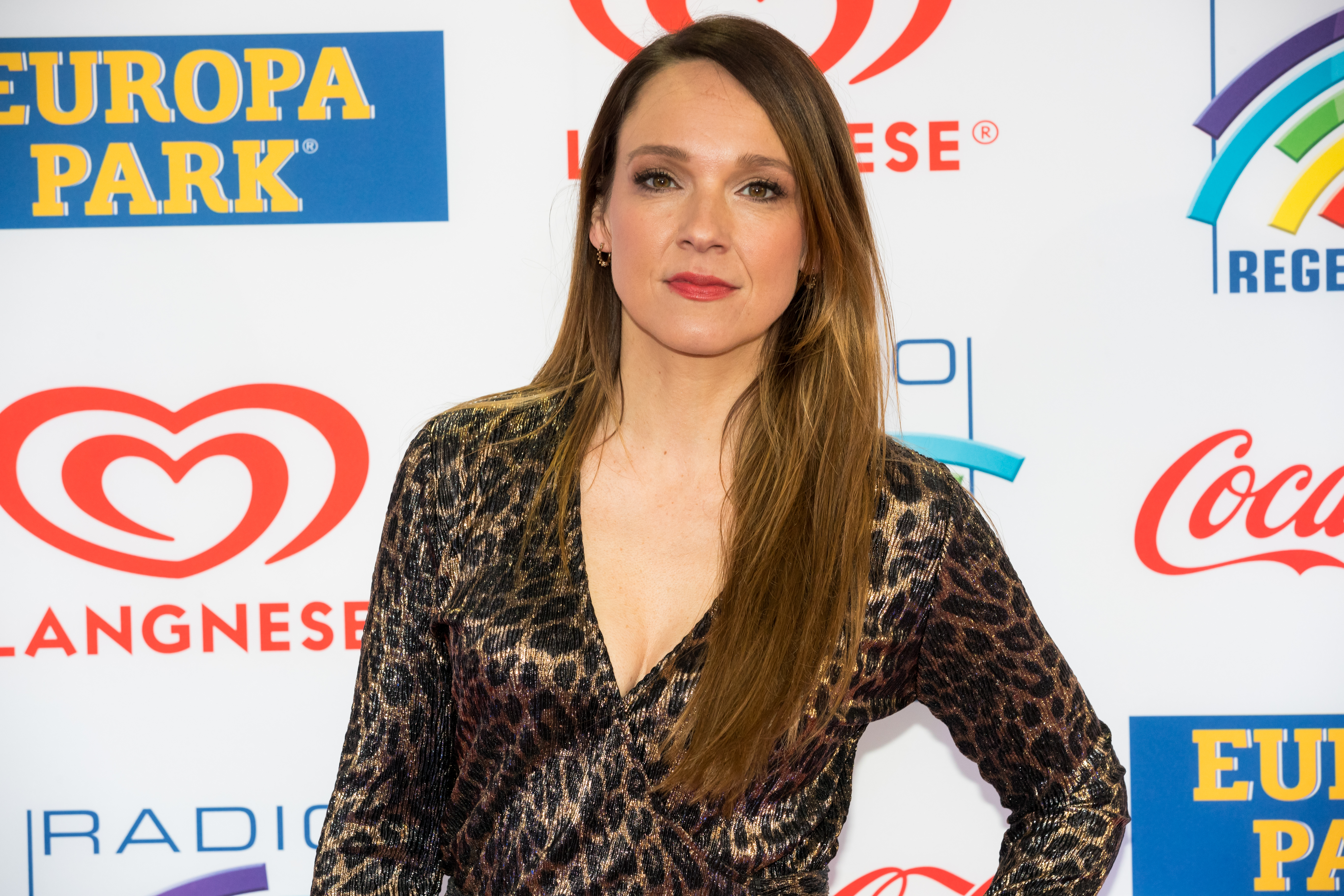
Carolin Kebekus (episode 3)

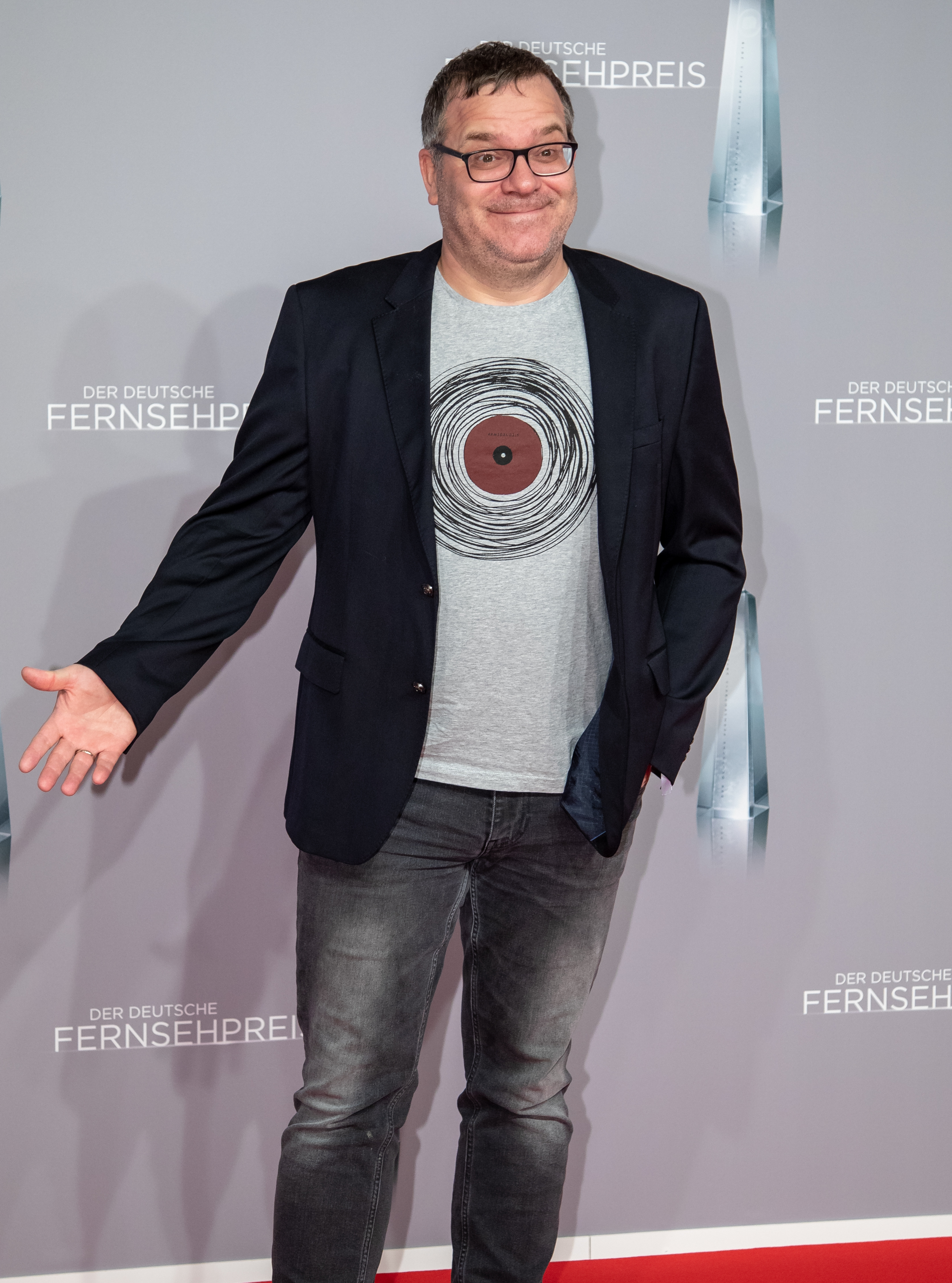
Elton (episode 4)

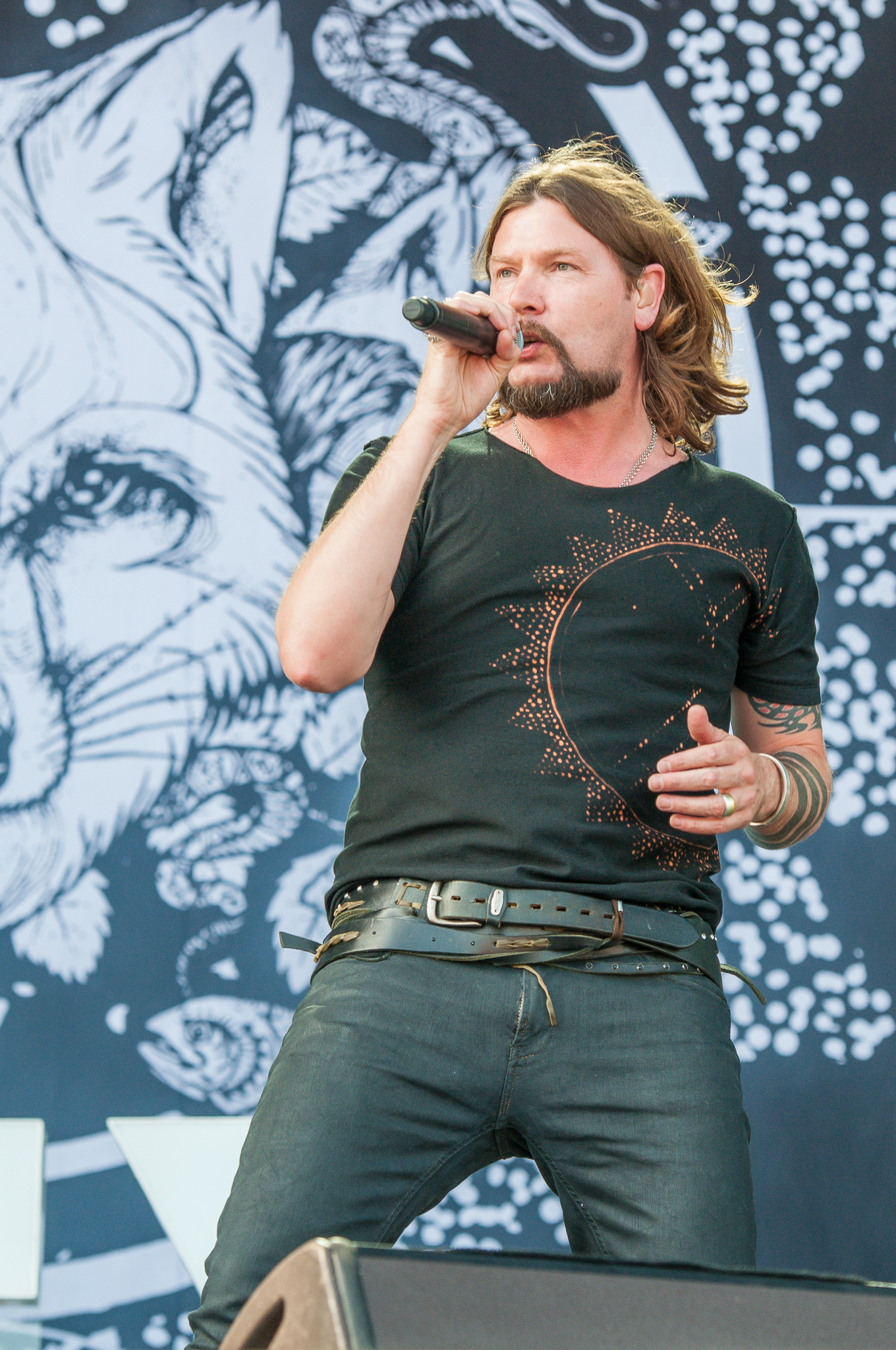
Rea Garvey (episode 5)

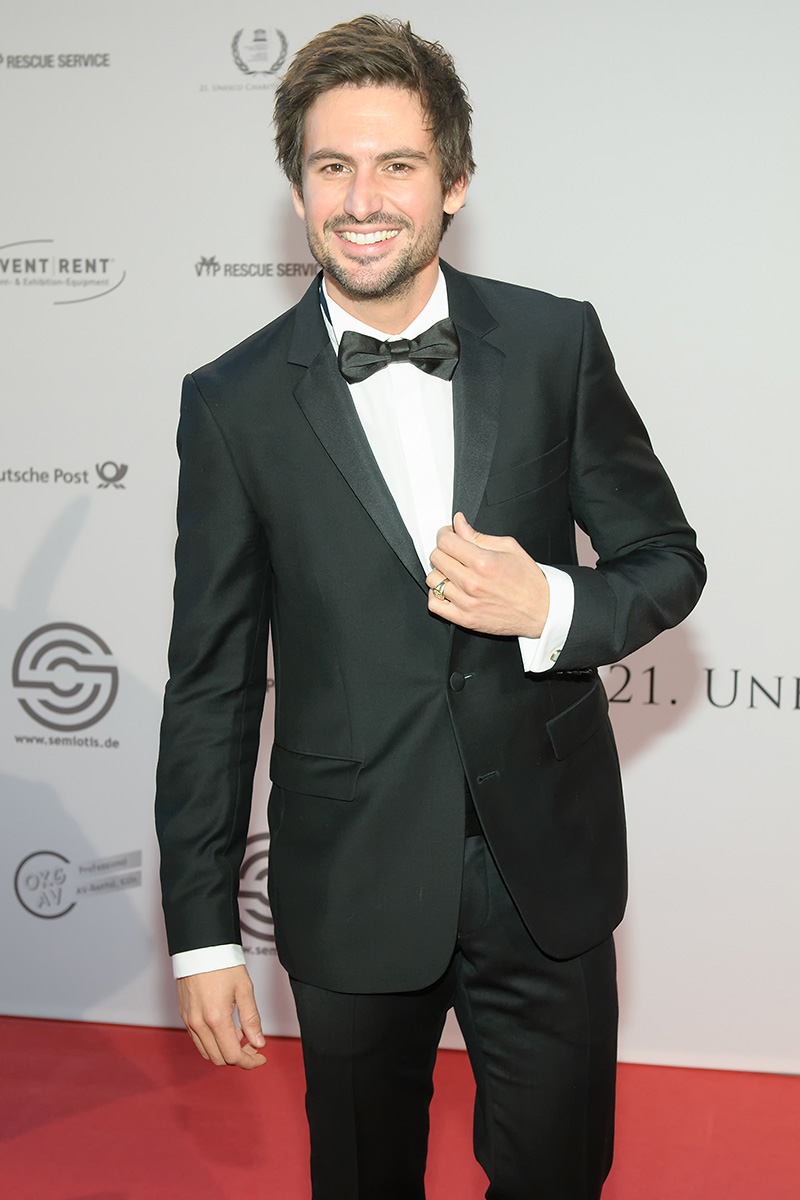
Tom Beck (episode 6)

Episode	Name	Notability	Ref.
1	Dieter Hallervorden	Actor/Comedian	
2	Ruth Moschner	Presenter	
3	Carolin Kebekus	Comedienne	
4	Elton	Presenter	
5	Rea Garvey	Singer	
6	Tom Beck	Actor/Singer	

== Contestants ==
Results
Stage name	Celebrity	Notability	Live Episodes							
Stage name	Celebrity	Notability	1	2	3	4	5	6		
Stage name	Celebrity	Notability	1	2	3	4	5	A	B	C
Skelett "Skeleton"	Sarah Lombardi	Singer	WIN	WIN	WIN	WIN	WIN	SAFE	WIN	WINNER
Alien	Alec Völkel	Musician	WIN	RISK	WIN	WIN	WIN	SAFE	WIN	RUNNER-UP
Nilpferd "Hippo"	Nelson Müller	Chef	WIN	WIN	RISK	RISK	RISK	SAFE	OUT	
Anubis	Ben Blümel	Singer	RISK	WIN	WIN	WIN	WIN	SAFE	OUT	
Erdmännchen "Meerkats"	Daniela Katzenberger	TV personality	WIN	WIN	RISK	WIN	RISK	OUT		
Erdmännchen "Meerkats"	Lucas Cordalis	Singer	WIN	WIN	RISK	WIN	RISK	OUT		
Katze "Cat"	Vicky Leandros	Singer	WIN	WIN	RISK	RISK	OUT			
Frosch "Frog"	Wigald Boning	Comedian	RISK	RISK	WIN	OUT				
Alpaka "Alpaca"	Sylvie Meis	Model	RISK	RISK	OUT					
Hummer "Lobster"	Jochen Schropp	Actor/Presenter	RISK	OUT						
Biene "Bee"	Veronica Ferres	Actress	OUT							

The masked singer won their face-off and remained in the competition.
The masked singer lost their face-off and was in the bottom five/four/three/two, but was not eliminated.
The masked singer was safe from elimination.
The masked singer was eliminated from the competition and unmasked upon their elimination.
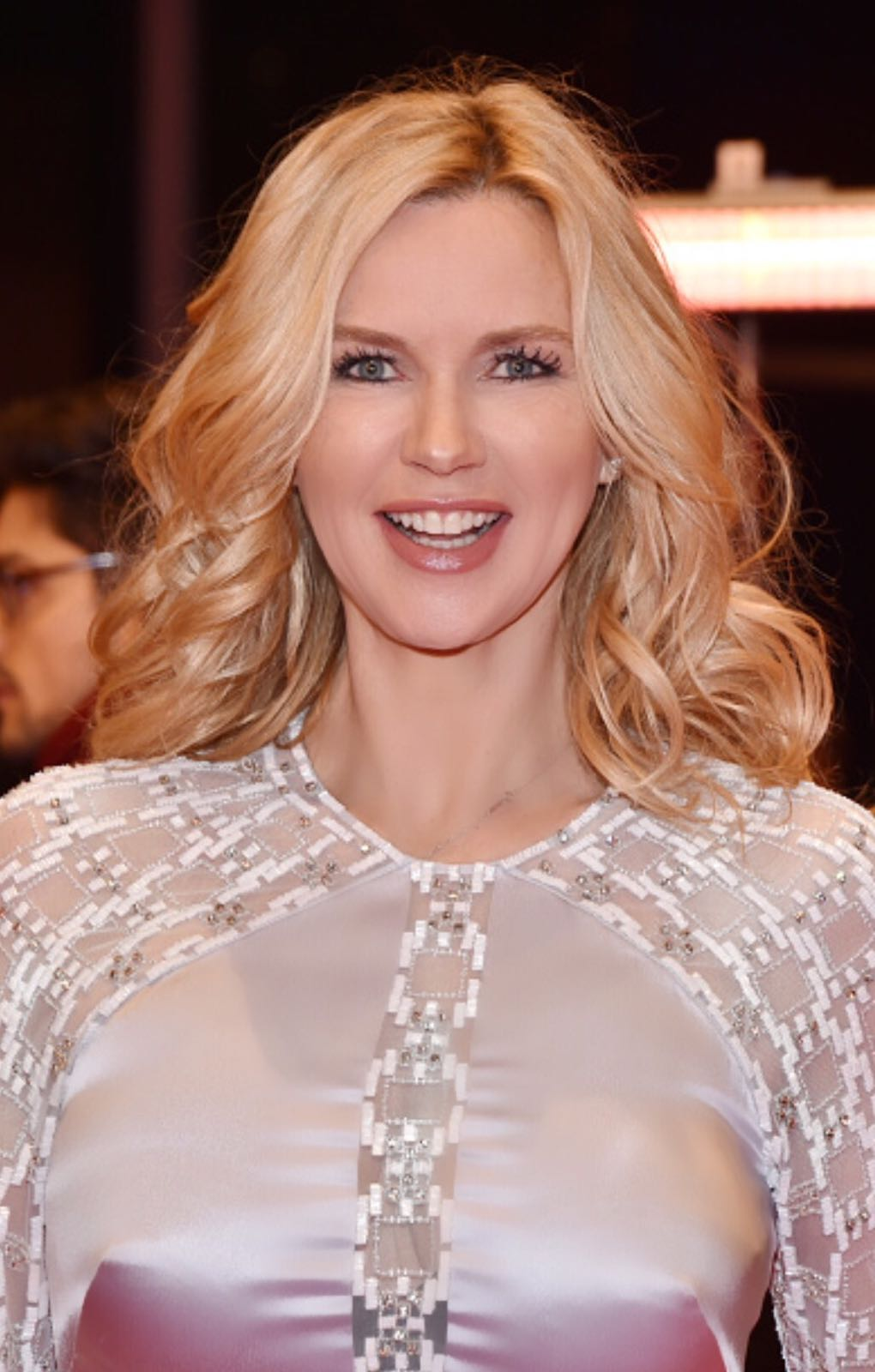
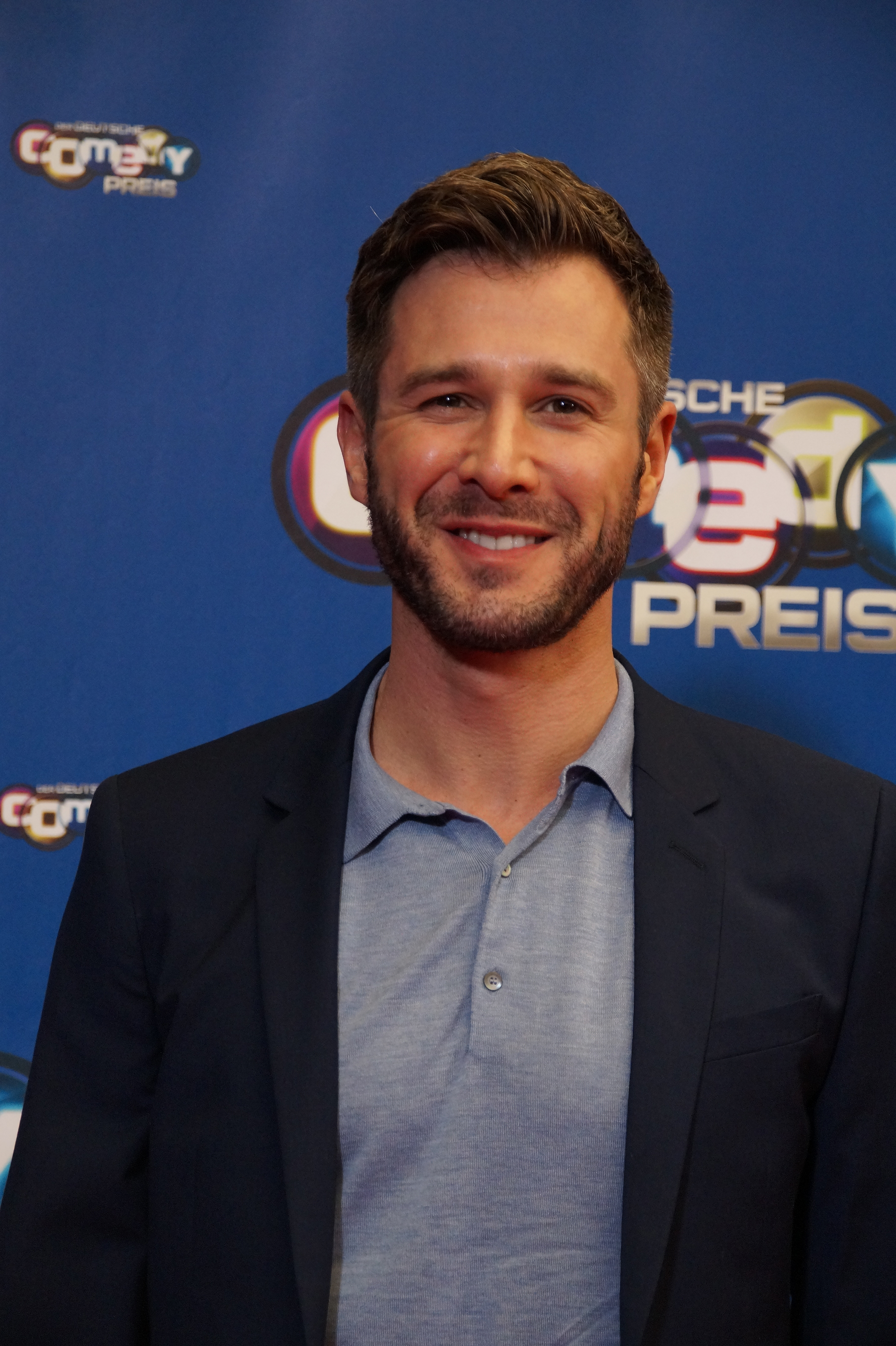
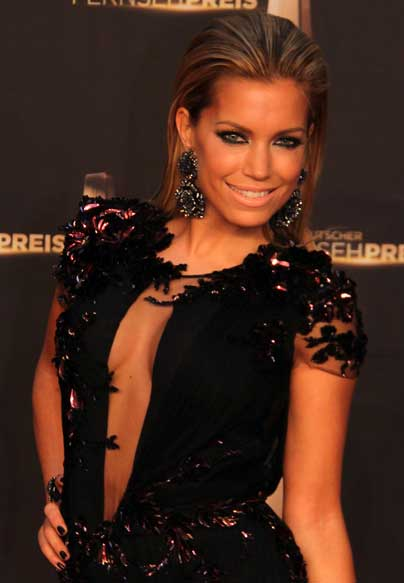
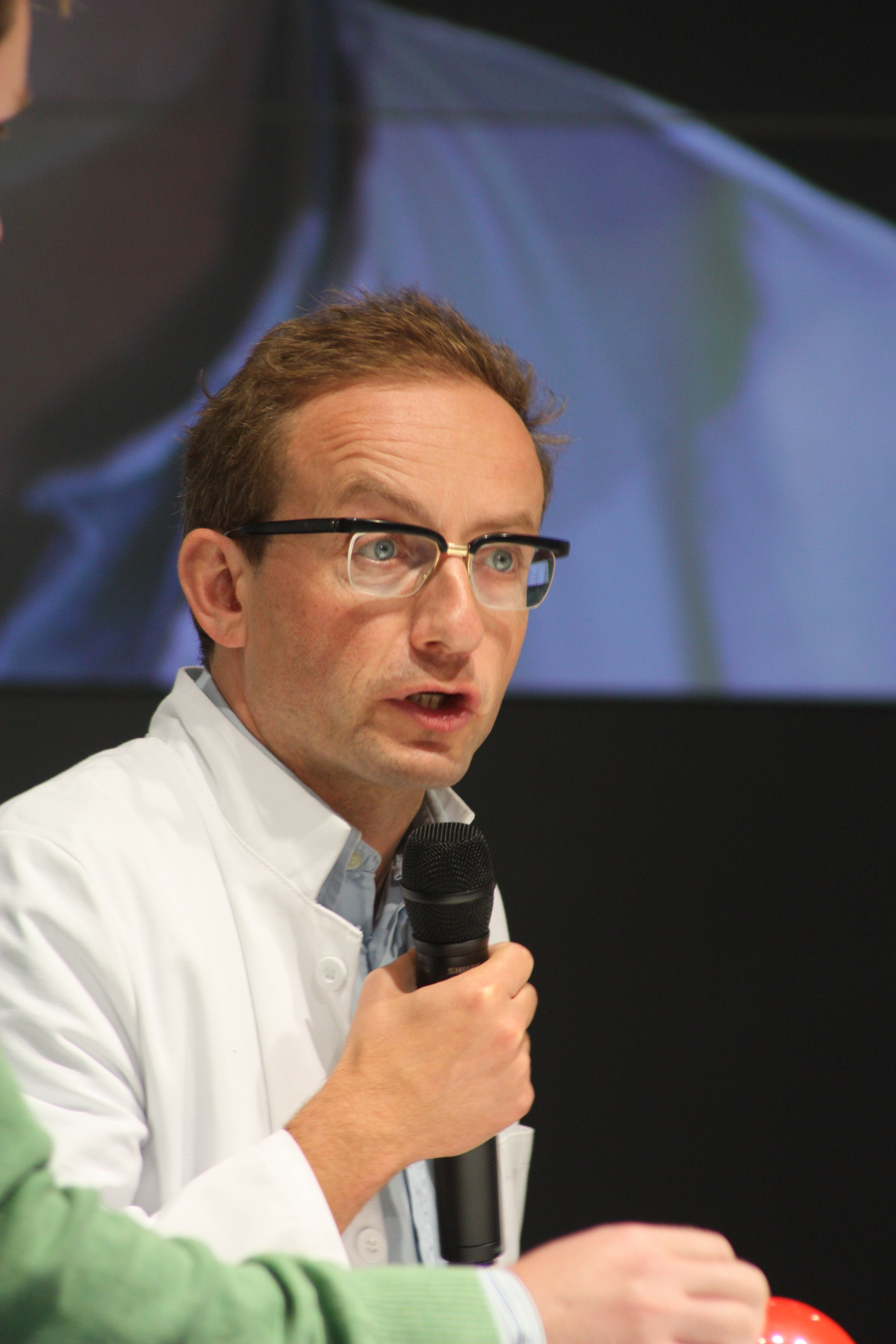
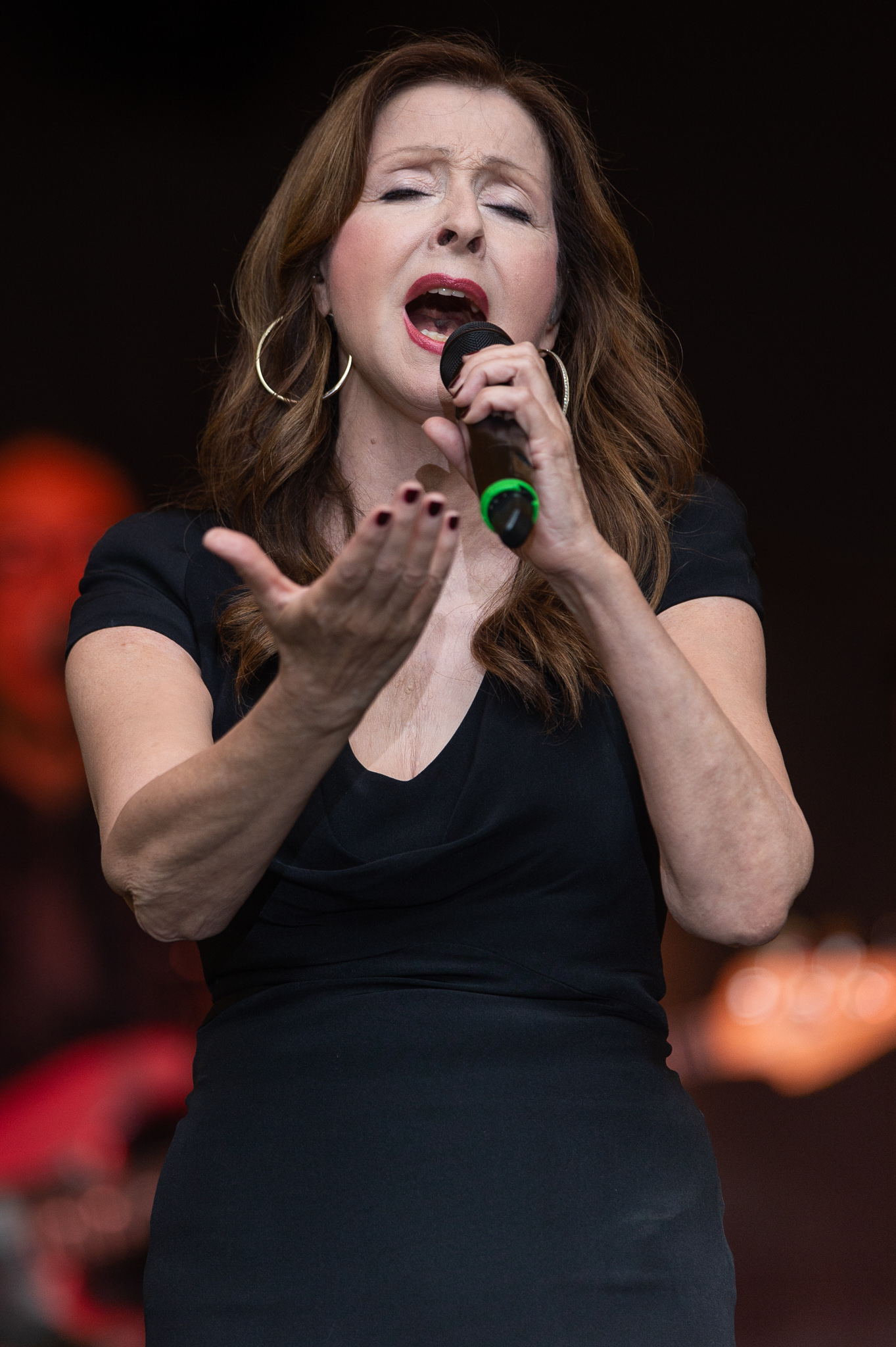
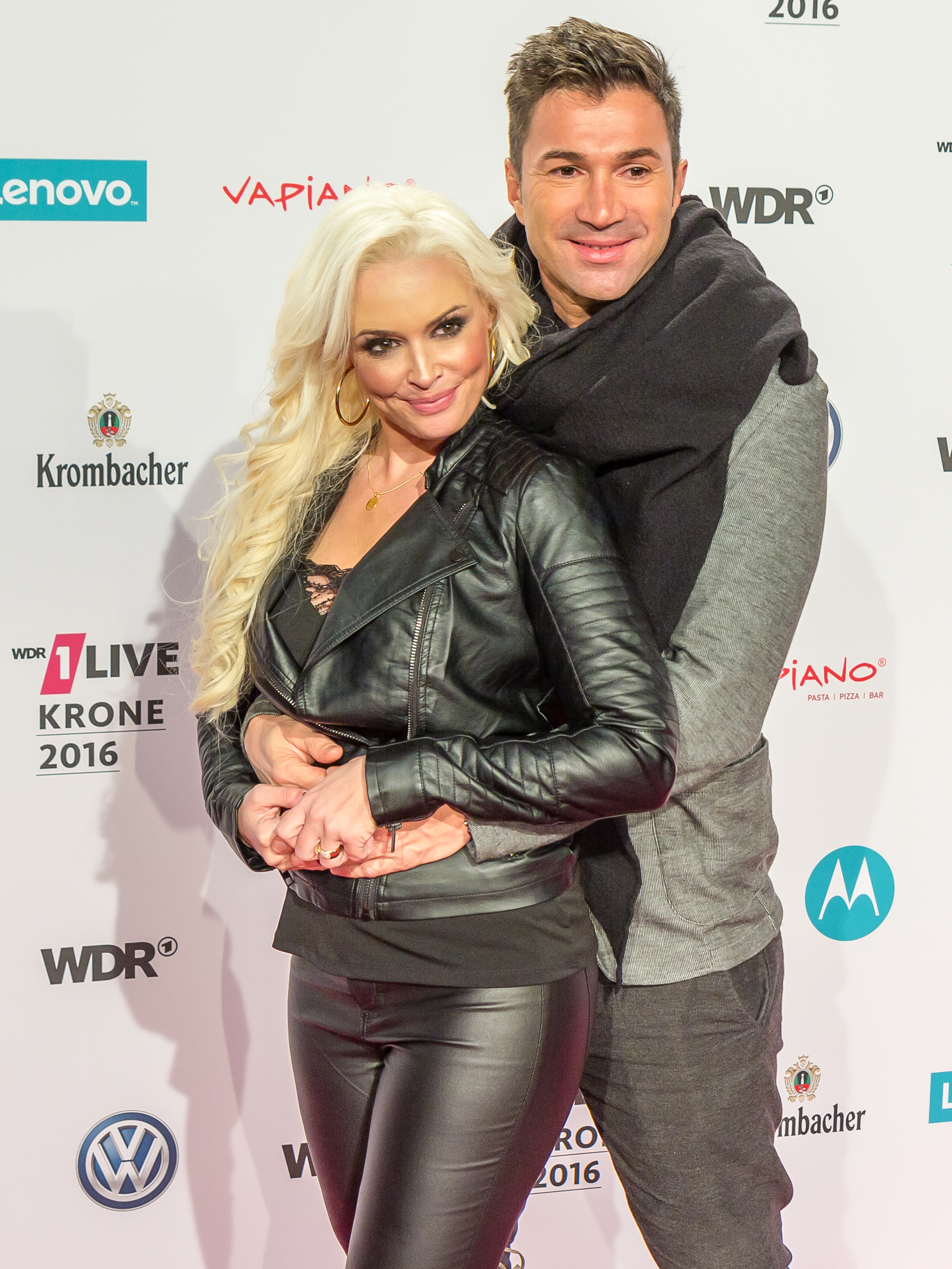
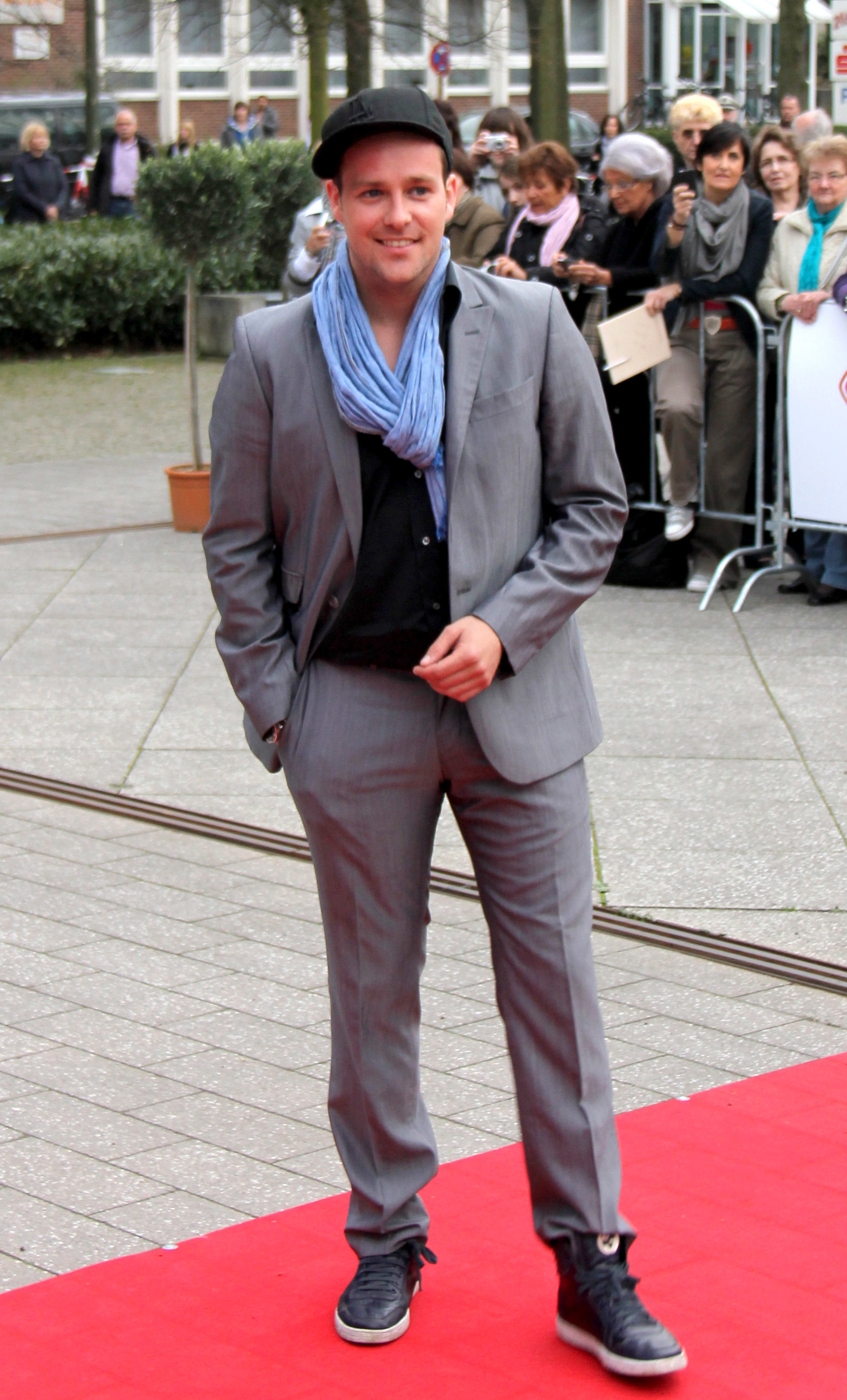
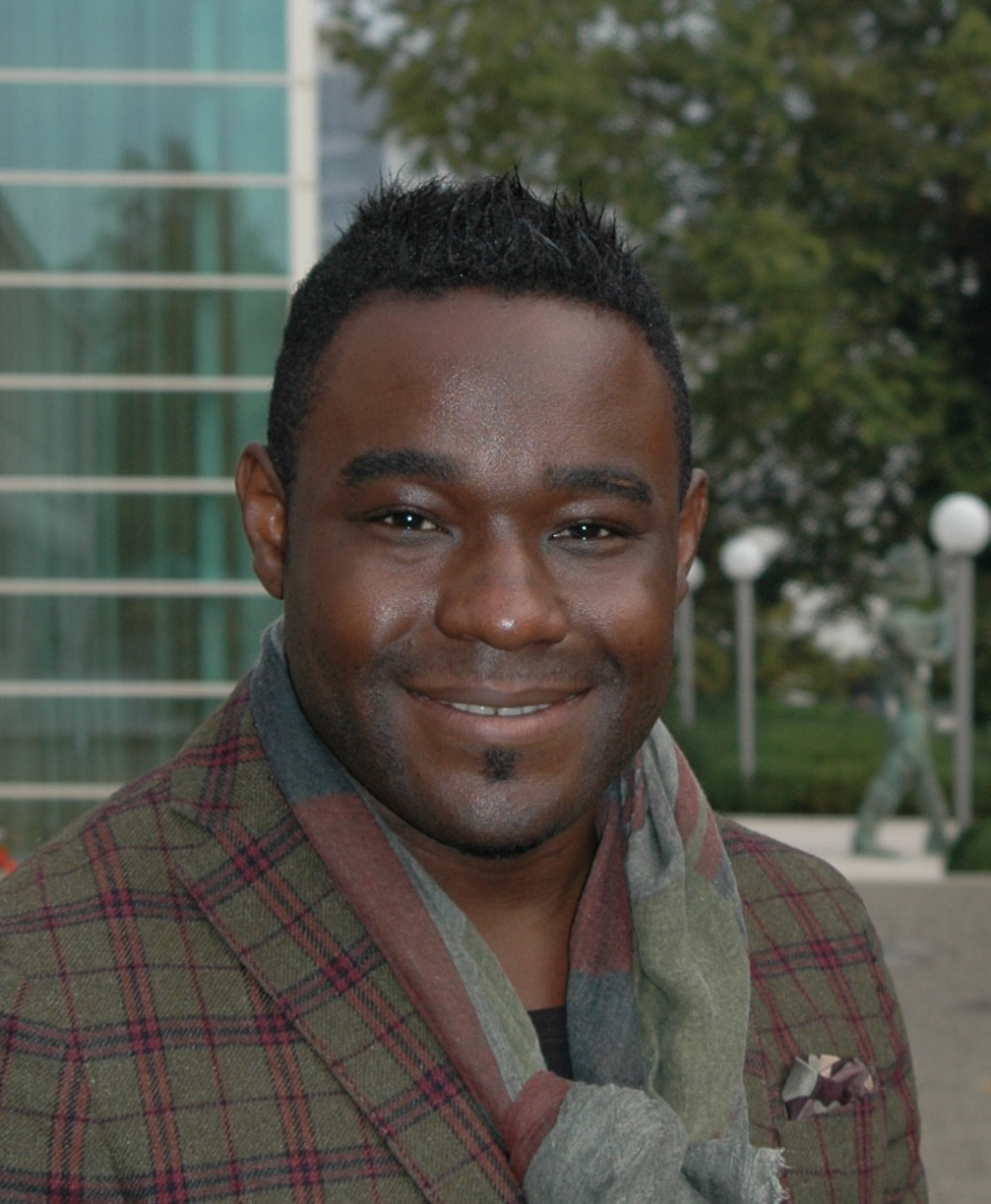
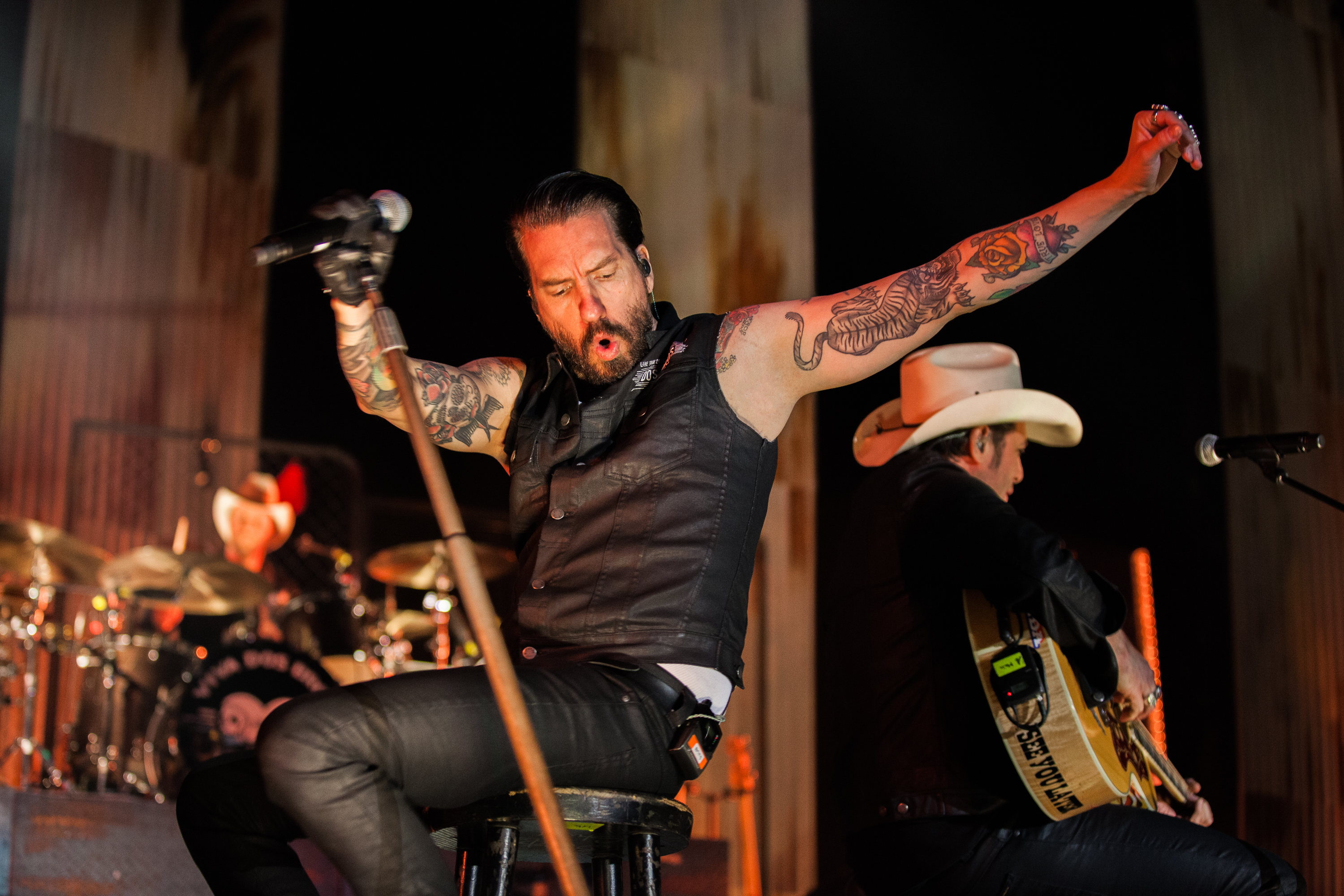
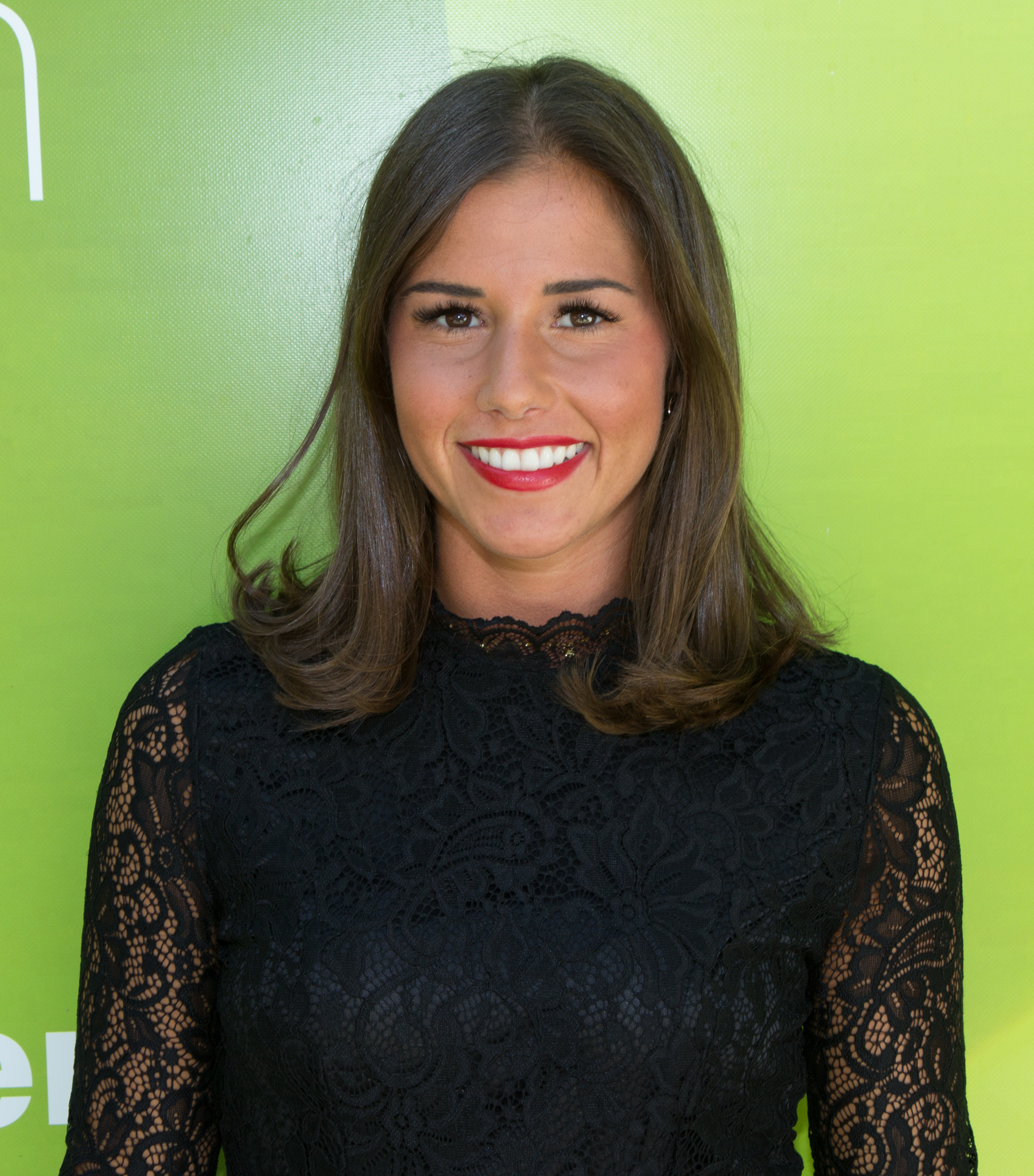
The celebrities who competed in the third season of The Masked Singer, pictured in order of elimination (l-r):
Veronica Ferres ("Biene"), Jochen Schropp ("Hummer"), Sylvie Meis ("Alpaka"), Wigald Boning ("Frosch"), Vicky Leandros ("Katze"), Daniela Katzenberger & Lucas Cordalis ("Erdmännchen"), Ben Blümel ("Anubis"), Nelson Müller ("Nilpferd"), Alec Völkel ("Alien"), Sarah Lombardi ("Skelett")

== Episodes ==
=== Week 1 (20 October) ===
Performances on the first live episode
#	Stage name	Song	Identity	Result
1	Erdmännchen	"Hungry Eyes" by Eric Carmen/"(I've Had) The Time of My Life" by Bill Medley & Jennifer Warnes	undisclosed	WIN
1	Erdmännchen	"Hungry Eyes" by Eric Carmen/"(I've Had) The Time of My Life" by Bill Medley & Jennifer Warnes	undisclosed	WIN
2	Alpaka	"Say So" by Doja Cat	undisclosed	RISK
3	Anubis	"They Don't Care About Us" by Michael Jackson	undisclosed	RISK
4	Nilpferd	"I Wanna Dance with Somebody (Who Loves Me)" by Whitney Houston	undisclosed	WIN
5	Hummer	"I Want to Know What Love Is" by Foreigner	undisclosed	WIN
6	Alien	"Welcome to St. Tropez" by DJ Antoine	undisclosed	RISK
7	Katze	"Someone like You" by Adele	undisclosed	WIN
8	Biene	"Twinkle, Twinkle, Little Star"/"Sweet Child o' Mine" by Guns N' Roses	Veronica Ferres	OUT
9	Frosch	"I Like to Move It" by Reel 2 Real	undisclosed	RISK
10	Skelett	"Bring Me to Life" by Evanescence	undisclosed	WIN

=== Week 2 (27 October) ===
Performances on the second live episode
#	Stage name	Song	Identity	Result
1	Hummer	"24K Magic" by Bruno Mars	Jochen Schropp	OUT
2	Nilpferd	"Purple Rain" by Prince	undisclosed	WIN
3	Anubis	"Legendary" by Welshly Arms	undisclosed	WIN
4	Alpaka	"Hot Stuff" by Donna Summer	undisclosed	RISK
5	Erdmännchen	"A Whole New World" from Aladdin	undisclosed	WIN
5	Erdmännchen	"A Whole New World" from Aladdin	undisclosed	WIN
6	Frosch	"One (Always Hardcore)" by Scooter	undisclosed	RISK
7	Katze	"The Show Must Go On" by Queen	undisclosed	WIN
8	Alien	"Alien" by Dennis Lloyd	undisclosed	RISK
9	Skelett	"Total Eclipse of the Heart" by Bonnie Tyler	undisclosed	WIN

=== Week 3 (3 November) ===
Performances on the third live episode
#	Stage name	Song	Identity	Result
1	Anubis	"As Long as You Love Me"/"Everybody (Backstreet's Back)" by Backstreet Boys	undisclosed	WIN
2	Erdmännchen	"Oh, Pretty Woman" by Roy Orbison	undisclosed	RISK
2	Erdmännchen	"Oh, Pretty Woman" by Roy Orbison	undisclosed	RISK
3	Alien	"Perfect Symphony" by Ed Sheeran and Andrea Bocelli	undisclosed	WIN
4	Nilpferd	"Flashdance... What a Feeling" by Irene Cara	undisclosed	RISK
5	Frosch	"How Deep Is Your Love" by Bee Gees	undisclosed	WIN
6	Alpaka	"Like a Virgin" by Madonna	Sylvie Meis	OUT
7	Katze	"Hello" by Lionel Richie	undisclosed	RISK
8	Skelett	"Dirty Diana"/"Thriller" by Michael Jackson	undisclosed	WIN

=== Week 4 (10 November) ===
Performances on the fourth live episode
#	Stage name	Song	Result	
1	Frosch	"You're My Heart, You're My Soul"/"Cheri, Cheri Lady"/"Brother Louie" by Modern Talking	RISK	
2	Anubis	"It's My Life" by Bon Jovi	WIN	
3	Erdmännchen	"I Want to Break Free" by Queen	WIN	
4	Alien	"Wrecking Ball" by Miley Cyrus	WIN	
5	Katze	"I Am What I Am" by Gloria Gaynor	RISK	
6	Nilpferd	"Empire State of Mind (Part II) Broken Down" by Alicia Keys	RISK	
7	Skelett	"I Have Nothing" by Whitney Houston	WIN	
Sing-off details			Identity	Result
1	Frosch	"Kung Fu Fighting" by Carl Douglas	Wigald Boning	OUT
2	Katze	"Diamonds" by Rihanna	undisclosed	SAFE
3	Nilpferd	"Theme from New York, New York" by Frank Sinatra	undisclosed	SAFE

=== Week 5 (16 November) – Semi-final ===
Performances on the fifth live episode
#	Stage name	Song	Result	
1	Alien	"Quando quando quando" by Pat Boone	WIN	
2	Nilpferd	"I Don't Want to Miss a Thing" by Aerosmith	RISK	
3	Anubis	"Rooftop" by Nico Santos	WIN	
4	Katze	"Sex Bomb" by Tom Jones & Mousse T.	RISK	
5	Erdmännchen	"Breaking Me" by Topic and A7S	RISK	
6	Skelett	"Chandelier" by Sia	WIN	
Sing-off details			Identity	Result
1	Nilpferd	"Ain't No Sunshine" by Bill Withers	undisclosed	SAFE
2	Katze	"Believe" by Cher	Vicky Leandros	OUT
3	Erdmännchen	"Señorita" by Shawn Mendes and Camila Cabello	undisclosed	SAFE
3	Erdmännchen	"Señorita" by Shawn Mendes and Camila Cabello	undisclosed	SAFE

=== Week 6 (24 November) – Final ===
- Group number: "One Night Only" by Jennifer Hudson

==== Round One ====
Performances on the final live episode – round one
#	Stage name	Song	Identity	Result
1	Anubis	"Last Resort" by Papa Roach	undisclosed	SAFE
2	Alien	"Best of You" by Foo Fighters	undisclosed	SAFE
3	Nilpferd	"All of Me" by John Legend	undisclosed	SAFE
4	Erdmännchen	"Shake It Off" by Taylor Swift	Daniela Katzenberger	OUT
4	Erdmännchen	"Shake It Off" by Taylor Swift	Lucas Cordalis	OUT
5	Skelett	"Fighter" by Christina Aguilera	undisclosed	SAFE

==== Round Two ====
Performances on the final live episode – round two
#	Stage name	Song	Identity	Result
1	Anubis	"Sonne" by Rammstein	Ben Blümel	OUT
2	Alien	"The Sound of Silence" by Simon & Garfunkel	undisclosed	WIN
3	Nilpferd	"The Best" by Tina Turner	Nelson Müller	OUT
4	Skelett	"Reflection" from Mulan	undisclosed	WIN

==== Round Three ====
Performances on the final live episode – round three
#	Stage name	Song	Identity	Result
1	Alien	"Perfect Symphony" by Ed Sheeran and Andrea Bocelli	Alec Völkel	RUNNER-UP
2	Skelett	"Dirty Diana"/"Thriller" by Michael Jackson	Sarah Lombardi	WINNER

== Reception ==
=== Ratings ===
Episode	Original airdate	Timeslot	Viewers (in millions)		Share (in %)		Source
Episode	Original airdate	Timeslot	Household	Adults 14-49	Household	Adults 14-49	Source
1	20 October 2020	Tuesdays 8:15 pm	3.33	2.03	12.5	25.9	
2	27 October 2020	Tuesdays 8:15 pm	2.91	1.79	10.9	23.4	
3	3 November 2020	Tuesdays 8:15 pm	3.21	1.92	11.2	22.4	
4	10 November 2020	Tuesdays 8:15 pm	3.01	1.84	11.2	23.7	
5	16 November 2020	Monday 8:15 pm	3.28	1.95	11.5	23.1	
6	24 November 2020	Tuesday 8:15 pm	3.65	2.07	14.8	28.8	
Average			3.33	1.99	12.8	24.9	
