= Ruth Moschner =

German TV presenter and actress (born 1976)

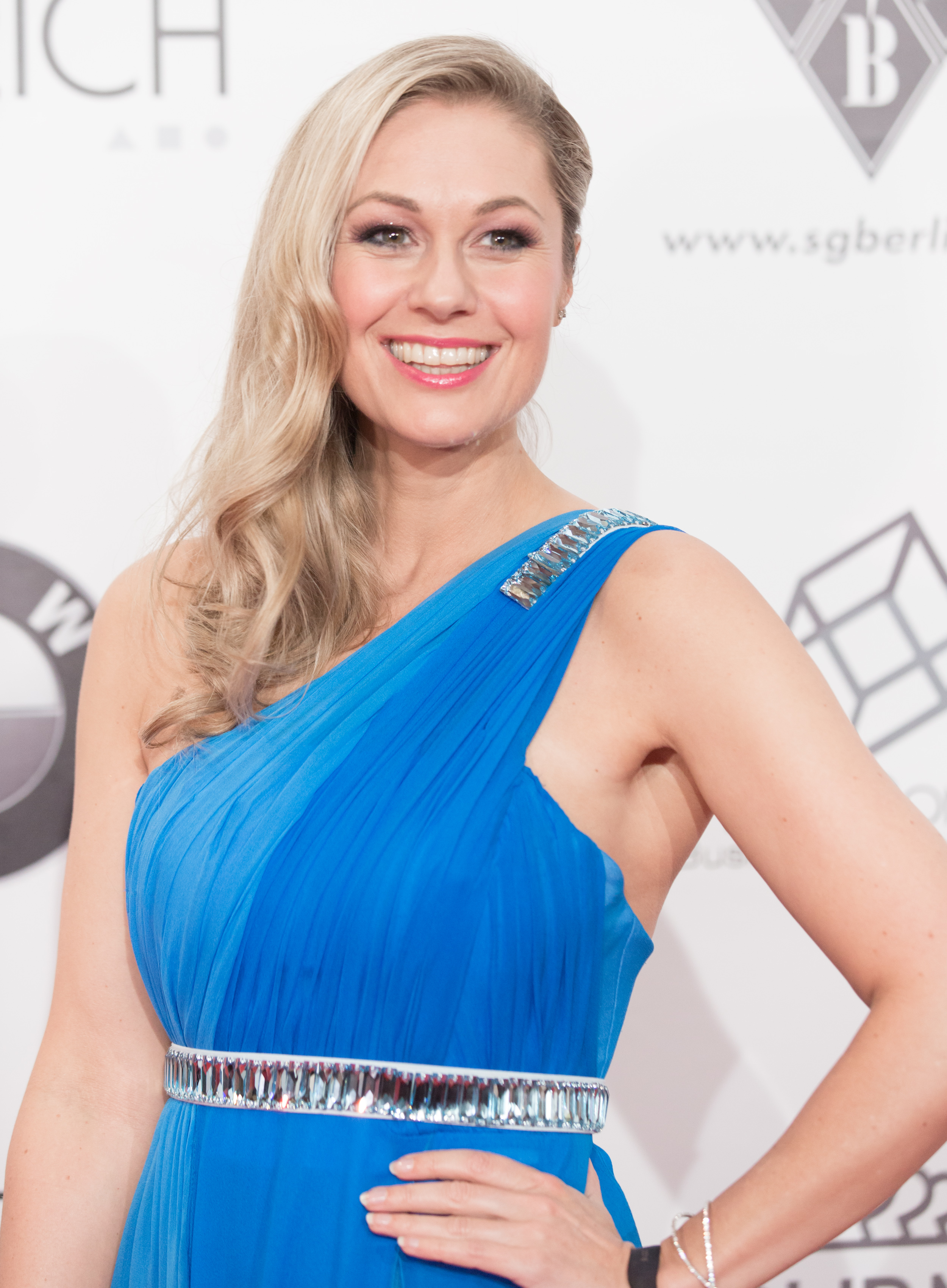
Moschner in 2016

Ruth Isabel Moschner (born 11 April 1976) is a German TV presenter and actress. She was a judge in the first season of the German talent show Das Supertalent (part of the Got Talent franchise), but was replaced by Sylvie van der Vaart in the second season. She also appeared in Big Brother Germany and the comedy show Freitag Nacht News. In 2006, she won a German version of the Dancing on Ice. She has twice been nominated for the Deutschen Comedy-Preis.

In November 2022, she was named by Noisy Pictures GmBH to host the 2023 German revival of the Sony Pictures Television, and Paramount Global Content Distribution game show Jeopardy!.
