= The Masked Dancer =

The Masked Dancer may refer to:

- The Masked Dancer (film), a lost 1924 American silent romance film
- The Masked Dancer (American TV series), a spinoff of the South Korean reality TV franchise The Masked Singer
  - The Masked Dancer (British TV series), based on the American TV series
  - The Masked Dancer (German TV series), based on the American TV series
