= 1975 in German television =

This is a list of German television related events from 1975.

== Events ==
- 3 February - Joy Fleming is selected to represent Germany at the 1975 Eurovision Song Contest with her song "Ein Lied kann eine Brücke sein". She is selected to be the twentieth German Eurovision entry during Ein Lied für Stockholm held at the HR Studios in Frankfurt.

== Debuts ==
=== ARD ===
- 23 January – Man kann auch anders leben (1975)
- 28 March – Der Stechlin (1975)
- 29 March – Nonstop Nonsens (1975–1980)
- 4 April – Dein gutes Recht (1975)
- 15 April – Schnickschnack (1975–1977)
- 18 May – PS (1975–1979)
- 3 July – Autoverleih Pistulla (1975)
- 16 July – Kommissariat IX (1975–1979)
- 9 August – Floris von Rosemund (1975)
- 4 September – Die schöne Marianne (1975)
- 24 September – Eurogang (1975–1976)
- 8 November – Der Strick um den Hals (1975)
- 29 November – Unsere Penny (1975–1976)
- 16 December – Eine ganz gewöhnliche Geschichte (1975–1976)

=== ZDF ===
- 1 January – Musik ist Trumpf (1975–1981)
- 6 March – Hoftheater (1975)
- 14 April – John Ralling - Abenteuer um Diamanten (1975)
- 1 May – Tadellöser & Wolff (1975)
- 12 June – Beschlossen und verkündet (1975)
- 4 August – Der schwarze Doktor (1975)
- 11 September – Berlin - 0:00 bis 24:00 (1975)
- 17 September – keine Polizei (1975)
- 11 December – Spannagl & Sohn (1975–1976)
- 19 December – Abenteuerlicher Simplizissimus (1975)
- 21 December – Burning Daylight (1975)

== Television shows ==
=== 1950s ===
- Tagesschau (1952–present)

=== 1960s ===
- heute (1963-present)

== Births ==
- 1 October - Fabian Busch, actor Der Kriminalist)
- date unknown - Christoph Bach, actor (The Heavy Water War)

== Deaths ==
- 4 December - Albert Bessler, 70, actor (Derrick)
