= German Constitutional Court abortion decision, 1975 =

BVerfGE 39, 1 - Abortion I
- Court: Federal Constitutional Court of Germany
- Full case name: Does the reformed abortion statute violate the right to life of the life developing in the mother's womb?
- Decided: February 25, 1975
- Citation: BVerfGE 39,1
- Transcript: Transcript (in German)

Case history
- Related action: BVerfGE 88, 203 - Abortion II Transcript (in German)

Court membership
- Judges sitting: First Senate Benda (President), Ritterspach, Dr. Haager, Rupp-von Brünneck, Dr. Böhmer, Dr. Faller, Dr. Brox, Dr. Simon

Case opinions
- Article 2, Paragraph 2, of the Basic Law guarantees the right to life for the unborn; therefore, Section 218a of the Criminal Code (as defined by the Criminal Law (Reform) Act of 1974) is overturned. The Court adopts the Indikationslösung - indicators which make explicit the predetermined circumstances or legally valid reasons for abortions.

Keywords
- Abortion

BVerfGE 39,1 — Abortion I (German: BVerfGE 39,1 — Schwangerschaftsabbruch I) was a landmark decision of the Federal Constitutional Court of Germany, addressing the issue of abortion in 1975, two years after the United States Supreme Court decision Roe v. Wade.

The Court held that respect for human dignity requires the criminalization of abortion if it is not justified by imperative reasons called "indications" (Indikationen). There are several indications, most notably the medical indication, meaning that the life of the mother would be at risk if she had to carry the child to term, and the criminal indication, meaning that the child is the result of the mother being raped.

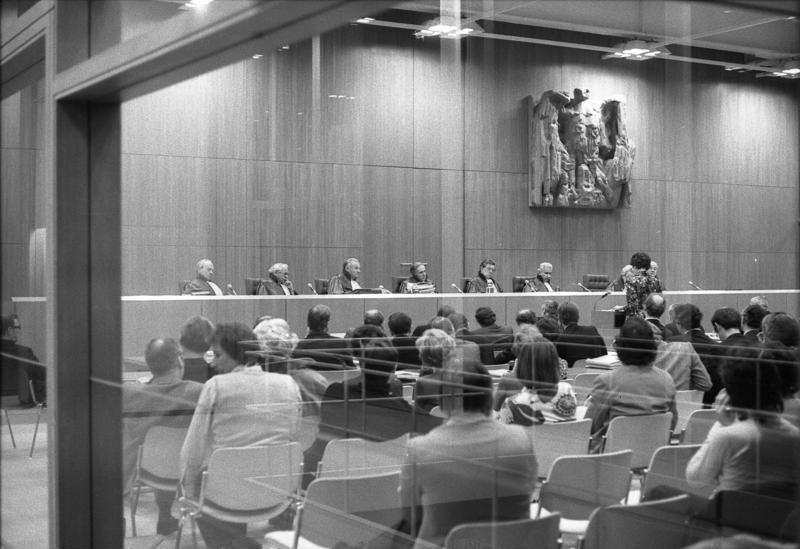
Oral hearing for the abortion decision, November 18, 1974

The decision considered the full range of arguments for legal abortion, both early (legalization had been a topic of debate in Germany since the turn of the century) and recent (used in other countries such as the United States and Britain that legalized abortion several years before). In particular, it specifically rejected the main points of reasoning in Roe v. Wade, as well as its "term solution", as inconsistent with the constitutional guarantee of the right to life. The Court held that the right to life, as guaranteed by Article 2, Paragraph 2, of the Basic Law, must extend to the life of the unborn when read in the light of the guarantee of human dignity, as laid out in Article 1 of the Basic Law.

The decision would punish a woman, or some other person, for killing an unborn fetus with anywhere from five to ten years in prison with no exceptions, claiming, “Any attempt is punishable.” This legislation against abortion (Schwangerschaftsabbruch) was done in the name of establishing a constitutional right to life for the unborn child, creating a legal framework that would protect the rights of all fetuses. This also determined the obligation of the state to protect an unborn individual's right to life against the mother herself.

The reunification of Germany resulted in a significant revision of abortion laws, which liberalized them in many respects, although leaving them more restrictive than the East German laws, which permitted abortion upon demand during the first twelve weeks of pregnancy. In the early 1990s, the Bundestag implemented a system whereby a woman having an abortion during the first three months of her pregnancy would not face legal sanctions if she underwent mandatory counseling, which has as one of its goals to present the case that the developing fetus is an independent human life. Additionally, the pregnant person would be subject to a 72-hour waiting period between counseling and the abortion. Later term abortions are not punishable if indicated medical reasons, such as possible harm to the woman from continued pregnancy, or a severely deformed fetus.

In another judgment in 1993, the Federal Constitutional Court struck down the 1992 relaxed restrictions on abortion. The Court considered that the defense of the unborn human being's right to life necessarily implies prohibition. While punitive measures are needed, the Court ruled, the constitutional mandate to protect unborn life could also include exceptions for social, political, and welfare indications. Still, the legislature was forced to remove from statutes the statement that not punishing abortion within twelve weeks would be legal.

== Background ==
- This 1975 decision by the FCC was made primarily in response to West Germany's 1974 Abortion Reform Law. The 1974 reform in West Germany legalized abortion in the first twelve weeks of pregnancy. As explained in the reasoning of the 1975 decision, The Fifth Statute to Reform the Penal Law of June 18, 1974 determined the guidelines for punishability of abortion in a new way, in that it replaced the provisions of Sections 218 and 220 of the penal code, decriminalizing abortion within the first twelve weeks under certain circumstances. The 1975 Abortion Decision of the FCC set in place a legal framework granting no exceptions for abortion, making any action to kill an unborn child grounds for legal conviction.

The president of the FCC during the decision was Ernst Benda. Benda was president of the FCC from 1971 to 1983, when the Abortion Decision of 1975 was made. Benda was a member of the Christian Democratic Union (CDU), which opposed legalizing abortion.

== Legacy ==
The 1975 decision set a precedent for subsequent abortion law reforms in Germany following the 1990 reunification. A primary instance where the abortion decision of 1975 was used as precedent in reunified Germany was the Judgement of 28 May 1993, which again declared abortions illegal and inaccessible. However, this decision, based on Germany's Basic Law, which protected the unborn child's right to life and stated a legal obligation for mothers to carry their babies to term, granted circumstantial exceptions if they were legally/constitutionally sound. The 1975 decision by the FCC provided the legal basis for this future decision.
