= Matthias Opdenhövel =

German television presenter

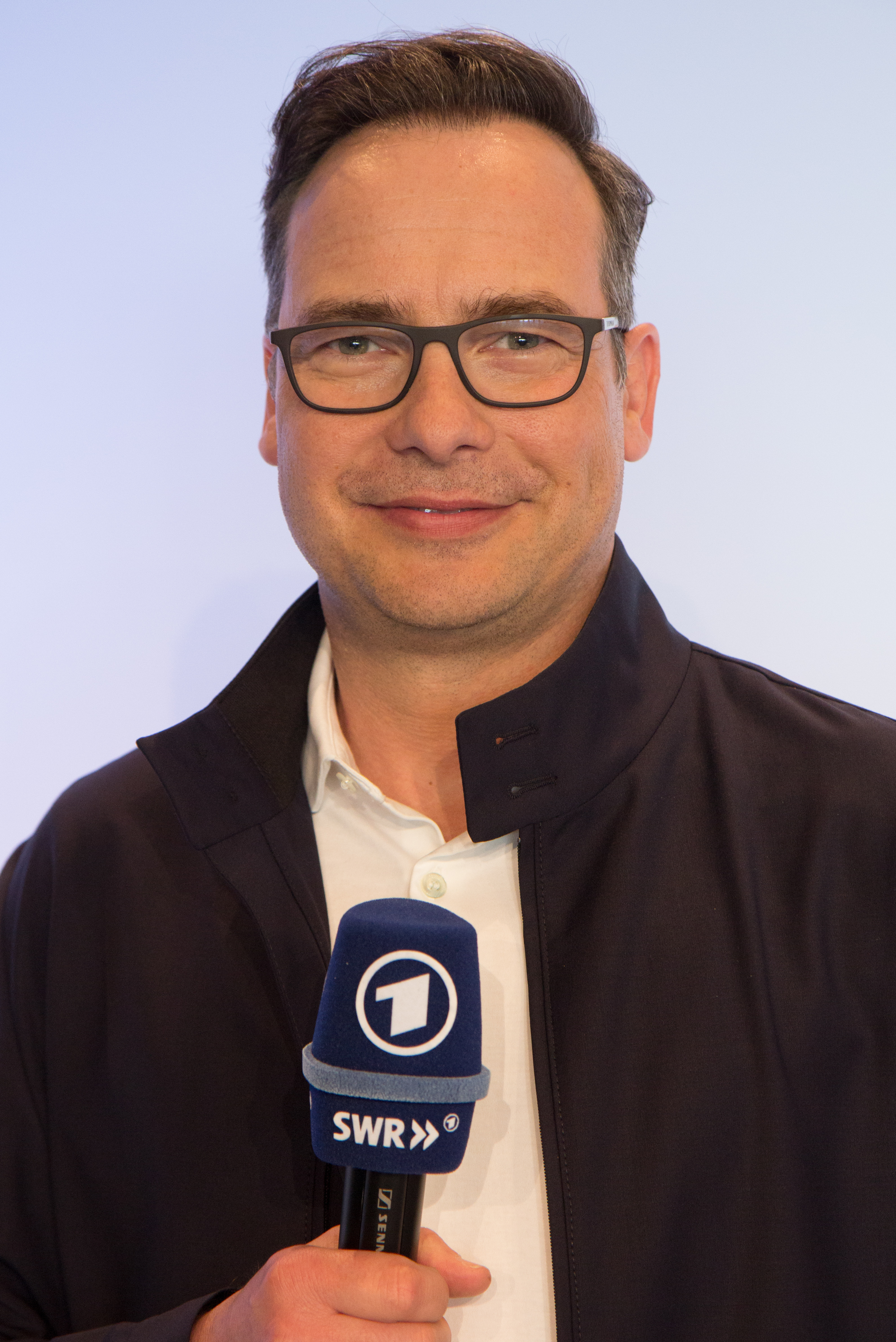
- Opdenhövel in 2018
- Born: Matthias Augustinus Wilhelm Georg Opdenhövel; 25 August 1970 (age 55); Detmold, West Germany
- Occupations: Television presenter; journalist
- Awards: See Awards
- Website: opdenhoevel.de

Matthias Augustinus Wilhelm Georg Opdenhövel (born 25 August 1970) is a German television presenter.

== Biography ==
Born in Detmold, Opdenhövel has worked as journalist and television presenter for German broadcasters ARD, Sat 1, Pro7, VIVA Germany, VOX and WDR. Together with Aleksandra Bechtel he presented Bitte lächeln between 1997 and 1998 on German broadcaster RTL 2. He also presented Frühstücksfernsehen Weck Up between 1998 and 2003 with Barbara Schöneberger on broadcaster Sat 1.

Opdenhövel is married, has two sons and lives with his family in Cologne.

== Television ==
=== Ongoing ===
- since 2019: The Masked Singer, Pro7
- since 2021: ran, Sat.1
- since 2024: The Floor
- 2010, since 2024: Schlag den Star, Pro7
- 1999–2001, since 2024: Hast du Töne?, VOX/Sat.1

=== Formerly / specials ===
- 1997–1998: Bitte lächeln, RTL Zwei
- 1999: Eins Live TV, WDR Fernsehen
- 2003–2004: Die Quiz Show, Sat.1
- 2005: TV total Bundestagswahl, Pro7
- 2006: Das große Ochsenrennen, Pro7
- 2006–2007: 1. Bundesliga, Arena
- 2006–2011: Schlag den Raab, Pro7
- 2006–2011: Die TV total Wok-WM, Pro7
- 2006–2011: Das große TV total Turmspringen, Pro7
- 2008: Die TV total Autoball Europameisterschaft 2008
- 2009: Wipe out – Heul nicht, lauf!, Pro7
- 2009: TV total Bundestagswahl, Pro7
- 2009: Das große Kipp-Roll-Fall Spektakel, Pro7
- 2009–2011: 1. Bundesliga, LIGA total!
- 2010: Die große TV total Stock Car Crash Challenge, Pro7
- 2010: Die TV total Autoball Weltmeisterschaft 2010, Pro7
- 2010: Unser Star für Oslo, Das Erste/Pro7
- 2010: ECHO 2010, Das Erste
- 2010–2011: Spieltaganalyse, Sport1
- 2011: Unser Song für Deutschland, Das Erste/Pro7
- 2011: Eurovision Total, Pro7
- 2011: Die Show zum Tag des Glücks, Das Vierte
- 2011–2021: Sportschau, Das Erste
- 2011–2021: Sportschau live: Fußball, Das Erste
- 2011–2021: Sportschau live: Skispringen, Das Erste
- 2013–2021: Sportschau vor acht, Das Erste
- 2012: Brot und Spiele, Das Erste
- 2012: Fußball-Europameisterschaft 2012 - Live-Moderator und Reporter im Quartier der deutschen Nationalmannschaft, Das Erste
- 2012: Sportschau-Club, Das Erste
- 2012: US Wahl 2012 – Die Wahlparty im Ersten, Das Erste
- 2012–2013: Opdenhövels Countdown, Das Erste
- 2013: Star-Biathlon, Das Erste
- 2013: Nordische Skiweltmeisterschaft 2013 - Skispringen, Das Erste
- 2013: Alles auf einen Deckel, WDR Fernsehen
- 2013: Die Show der unglaublichen Helden, Das Erste
- 2014: Star-Biathlon, Das Erste
- 2014: Olympische Winterspiele 2014 – Skispringen und Interviews im Deutschen Haus, Das Erste
- 2014: Fußball-Weltmeisterschaft 2014 – Live-Moderator mit Mehmet Scholl, Das Erste
- 2014: 24 Stunden Quiz, WDR Fernsehen
- 2015: U-21-Fußball-Europameisterschaft 2015, Das Erste
- 2015: Gefällt mir! – Die total vernetzte Show, WDR
- 2016: US-Wahl 2016 – Die Wahlnacht im Ersten, Das Erste
- 2016–2017: Rate mal, wie alt ich bin, Das Erste
- 2018: Fußball-Weltmeisterschaft 2018, Das Erste – Live moderator with Thomas Hitzlsperger, Stefan Kuntz and Hannes Wolf
- 2018–2019: Big Bounce – Die Trampolin Show, RTL
- 2019: Die Liveshow bei dir zuhause, Pro7 (with Steven Gätjen)
- 2019–2021: Joko & Klaas gegen ProSieben, Pro7 (guest appearances)
- 2021–2023: Zervakis & Opdenhövel.Live, Pro7 (with Linda Zervakis)
- 2022: The Masked Dancer, Pro7
- 2022: Die Stapelshow. Pro7

== Awards ==
- 2007: Deutscher Fernsehpreis in category Best moderation entertainment for Schlag den Raab
- 2008: Goldene Kamera in category Best entertainment for Schlag den Raab
- 2010: Deutscher Fernsehpreis in category Best entertainment for Unser Star für Oslo
- 2012: Deutscher Fernsehpreis in category Best sports broadcast for game analysis of UEFA Euro 2012 (together with Mehmet Scholl)
- 2015: Deutscher Sportjournalistenpreis in category Best German sport moderator

== Works ==
- Die Schnellficker-Schuhe und andere Geschichten; Erlebnisse eines VIVA-Moderators. vgs-Verlag, 1998, ISBN 3-8025-2619-8.
- Steffi Hugendubel-Doll: Flipflops, iPod, Currywurst: Wer hat’s erfunden? cbj-Verlag, 2012, ISBN 3-570-13621-3.
