= The Floor (German game show) =

2024 game show hosted by Matthias Opdenhövel

- Genre: Game show
- Created by: John de Mol
- Based on: The Floor
- Presented by: Matthias Opdenhövel
- Country of origin: Germany
- Original language: German
- No. of seasons: 2
- No. of episodes: 12

Production
- Executive producer: John de Mol
- Camera setup: Multi-camera
- Running time: 135 minutes
- Production companies: Cheerio Entertainment; Talpa

Original release
- Network: Sat.1
- Release: February 29, 2024 – present

The Floor is a German version of the Dutch game show with the same name. The series is hosted by Matthias Opdenhövel and premiered on February 29, 2024 on Sat.1. The game is based around a floor grid of 100 squares. Each square is occupied by a contestant with expertise in a different trivia category. Pairs of contestants face each other in head-to-head trivia duels, with the winner taking over all territory controlled by the loser.

The game progresses over the course of a season with the grand prize of €100,000 awarded to the player who ultimately controls the entire floor. Secondary prizes of €5,000 are awarded to the winner of each episode. In season 1, the winner was determined as the player who had the most territory at the end of the episode. In season 2, the two players with the most territory at the end of an episode played a final duel to determine the winner.

== Format ==
The season begins with 100 contestants standing in separate spaces of a ten-by-ten grid on the studio floor. Each contestant has a category in which they feel particularly knowledgeable.

One contestant is chosen at random and shown the categories of all opponents whose territories share at least one edge with their own, then the player chooses one of them to face in a head-to-head duel. The two contestants take turns identifying a series of images, sounds, clues or multiple choice questions associated with the challenged opponent's category. They are given separate 45-second clocks, only one of which runs at any given time, starting with the challenger. The contestant in control must give a correct answer in order to stop their clock and turn control over to the opponent. Multiple guesses are allowed without penalty, and a contestant may pass whenever desired - apart from multiple choice questions, where an answer must be given and a wrong one results in a penalty. They must wait three seconds for a new image, sound, clues or question to be shown.

The first contestant to run out of time is eliminated from the game and gives up all of their territory to the winner, who takes/retains the challenger's category. The winner may then either challenge another opponent or return to the grid; in the latter case, a new contestant is selected at random from those who have not yet played a duel. When only two contestants remain, the one controlling more territory decides whose category will be used for the final duel.

At the end of each episode, except the last one, an episode winner will be determined. In season 1, the winner was determined as the player who had the most territory at the end of the episode. In season 2, the two players with the most territory at the end of an episode played a final duel to determine the winner. The winner will receive €5,000. The last contestant standing at the end of the sixth and final episode of the season wins the grand prize of €100,000. The overall prize money pot for the season therefore is €125,000.

=== Series overview ===
Season	Contestants	Episodes	Originally released		Winner	Runner-up	3rd place
Season	Contestants	Episodes	First released	Last released	Winner	Runner-up	3rd place
1	100	6	February 29, 2024	April 4, 2024	Jan	Johannes	Kai
2	100	6	April 10, 2025	May 15, 2025	Leslie	Seyma	Clive

== Season 1 ==
=== Contestants ===
The categories in bold represent the original theme of expertise of each contestant.

Results (Season 1)
Name	Job	City	Age	Category	Space Assignment	Duels	Duels Played	Episodes Won	Exited
Natalia	Marketing and event specialist	Aschaffenburg	46	**Events & Festivals**	69	1. German Musicians – Claudia S. def. Natalia (Ep. 1)	1	N/A	Episode 1
Timo	Game designer	Teltow	36	**Harry Potter**	56	2. International Bands – Jeanette def. Timo (Ep. 1)	1	N/A	Episode 1
Jeanette	Office clerk	Mannheim	49	**International Bands**; Harry Potter	66	2. International Bands – Jeanette def. Timo (Ep. 1); 3. Games & Board Games – Bastian def. Jeanette (Ep. 1)	2	N/A	Episode 1
Arne	Writer	Springen	54	**Creatures from Outer Space**	23	4. Religions – Sebastian def. Arne (Ep. 1)	1	N/A	Episode 1
Guido	MBA	Kirchwald	53	**Models**	29	5. Models – Trixi def. Guido (Ep. 1)	1	N/A	Episode 1
Trixi	Cruise ship expert	Rehlingen-Siersburg	52	**World Map**	28	5. Models – Trixi def. Guido (Ep. 1); 6. Herbs & Spices – Vivien def. Trixi (Ep. 1)	2	N/A	Episode 1
Mira	Dual BA student	Kassel	22	**Shopping**	92	7. Shopping – Toni def. Mira (Ep. 1)	1	N/A	Episode 1
Toni	Insurance expert	Bodenseekreis	35	**Beverages**	91	7. Shopping – Toni def. Mira (Ep. 1); 8. International Blockbusters – Kevin def. Toni (Ep. 1)	2	N/A	Episode 1
Kevin	BA student	Bremen	28	**International Blockbusters**; Beverages	93	8. International Blockbusters – Kevin def. Toni (Ep. 1); 9. German Hits – Mike def. Kevin (Ep. 1)	2	N/A	Episode 1
Sarah S.	Journalist	Hamburg	37	**Children's Books**	53	10. Household – Kirsten def. Sarah S. (Ep. 1)	1	N/A	Episode 1
Kirsten	Housewife	Brilon	45	**Household**; Children's Books	63	10. Household – Kirsten def. Sarah S. (Ep. 1); 11. Grandma's Kitchen – Michael def. Kirsten (Ep. 1)	2	N/A	Episode 1
Annika N.	Facility manager	Schönefeld	37	**Football Clubs**	52	12. Football Clubs – Michael def. Annika N. (Ep. 1)	1	N/A	Episode 1
Avraam	Facility management assistant	Esslingen	39	**Mythology**	17	13. Disney Movies – Irina def. Avraam (Ep. 1)	1	N/A	Episode 1
Vivien	Health assistant	Lünen	30	**Herbs & Spices**; World Map	19	6. Herbs & Spices – Vivien def. Trixi (Ep. 1); 14. World Map – Irina def. Vivien (Ep. 1)	2	N/A	Episode 1
Susanne	Psychologist	Gernsbach	47	**Children's Series**	30	15. Children's Series – Irina def. Susanne (Ep. 1)	1	N/A	Episode 1
Sabrina P.	Personnel specialist	Kelheim	30	**Child Stars**	67	16. Wardrobe – Sabine def. Sabrina P. (Ep. 1)	1	N/A	Episode 1
Jonas	BA student	Cologne	30	**Song Lyrics**	85	17. Famous Animals – Marc-Hendrik def. Jonas (Ep. 1)	1	N/A	Episode 1
Alex	Senior sales manager	Hamburg	37	**Airlines**	98	18. Beauty & Cosmetics – Giulia def. Alex (Ep. 2)	1	N/A	Episode 2
Hendrik	Film editor	Chemnitz	35	**English Hits**	11	19. Vegetables – Kim def. Hendrik (Ep. 2)	1	N/A	Episode 2
Kim	Sustainability student	Mülheim an der Ruhr	23	**Vegetables**; English Hits	12	19. Vegetables – Kim def. Hendrik (Ep. 2); 20. Technical Appliances & Gadgets – Steffen def. Kim (Ep. 2)	2	N/A	Episode 2
Steffen	Industrial climber	Glienicke/Nordbahn	38	**Technical Appliances & Gadgets**; English Hits	22	20. Technical Appliances & Gadgets – Steffen def. Kim (Ep. 2); 21. Social Media Stars – Darj def. Steffen (Ep. 2)	2	N/A	Episode 2
Darj	Design student	Aachen	23	**Social Media Stars**; English Hits	21	21. Social Media Stars – Darj def. Steffen (Ep. 2); 22. Creatures from Outer Space – Sebastian def. Darj (Ep. 2)	2	N/A	Episode 2
Meadow	Retiree	Ritterhude	55	**Fruit**	65	23. Sports – Sonja def. Meadow (Ep. 2)	1	N/A	Episode 2
Joel	Digital societies student	Berlin	20	**Means of Transport**	74	24. Means of Transport – Sonja def. Joel (Ep. 2)	1	N/A	Episode 2
Bastian	Qualified IT specialist	Hillscheid	39	**Games & Board Games**; Harry Potter	76	3. Games & Board Games – Bastian def. Jeanette (Ep. 1); 25. Harry Potter – Sonja def. Bastian (Ep. 2)	2	N/A	Episode 2
Janina B.	Software developer	Osterode	43	**Dog Breeds**	40	26. Dog Breeds – Martschel def. Janina B. (Ep. 2)	1	N/A	Episode 2
Martschel	Businessman	Senden	35	**Currencies**	50	26. Dog Breeds – Martschel def. Janina B.; 27. Mythology – Irina def. Martschel (Ep. 2)	2	N/A	Episode 2
Irina	Registrar	Villmar	33	**Disney Movies**; Mythology; Currencies	27	13. Disney Movies – Irina def. Avraam (Ep. 1); 14. World Map – Irina def. Vivien (Ep. 1); 15. Children's Series – Irina def. Susanne (Ep. 1); 27. Mythology – Irina def. Martschel (Ep. 2); 28. Phrases & Sayings – Nicole def. Irina (Ep. 2)	5	Episode 1; 6 spaces (€5,000)	Episode 2
Jana	Police officer	Ottobrunn	24	**Traffic Signs**	82	29. Beverages – Mike def. Jana (Ep. 2)	1	N/A	Episode 2
Ingo B.	Air cargo shipper	Ronnenberg	47	**Language**	94	30. Language – Mike def. Ingo B. (Ep. 2)	1	N/A	Episode 2
Marc-Hendrik	Dentist	Glücksburg	52	**Famous Animals**; Song Lyrics	95	17. Famous Animals – Marc-Hendrik def. Jonas (Ep. 1); 31. Song Lyrics – Mike def. Marc-Hendrik (Ep. 2)	2	N/A	Episode 2
Mike	Prison officer	Lower Rhine region	43	**German Hits**; Beverages; Traffic Signs	81	9. German Hits – Mike def. Kevin (Ep. 1); 29. Beverages – Mike def. Jana (Ep. 2); 30. Language – Mike def. Ingo B. (Ep. 2); 31. Song Lyrics – Mike def. Marc-Hendrik (Ep. 2); 32. Fruit – Sonja def. Mike (Ep. 2)	5	N/A	Episode 2
Andreas	Detective chief superintendent	Mannheim	50	**Number Plates**	90	33. Number Plates – Sandra def. Andreas (Ep. 2)	1	N/A	Episode 2
Sonja	Journalism student	Cologne	25	**Sports**; Fruit; Traffic Signs	75	23. Sports – Sonja def. Meadow (Ep. 2); 24. Means of Transport – Sonja def. Joel (Ep. 2); 25. Harry Potter – Sonja def. Bastian (Ep. 2); 32. Fruit – Sonja def. Mike (Ep. 2); 34. Traffic Signs – Janina v. F. def. Sonja (Ep. 2)	5	N/A	Episode 2
Daniel V.	Salesman	Welzheim	38	**German Movies**	45	35. German Movies – Tim def. Daniel V. (Ep. 3)	1	N/A	Episode 3
Kamjar	Public servant	Eschweiler	31	**Athletes**	46	36. Athletes – Tim def. Kamjar (Ep. 3)	1	N/A	Episode 3
Tim	Comedian	Dinslaken	33	**Ads & Slogans**	35	35. German Movies – Tim def. Daniel V. (Ep. 3); 36. Athletes – Tim def. Kamjar (Ep. 3); 37. German Bands – Daniel P. def. Tim (Ep. 3)	3	N/A	Episode 3
Michaela	Hotel mistress	Gernsheim	50	**Hits of the 80es**	78	38. Airlines – Giulia def. Michaela (Ep. 3)	1	N/A	Episode 3
Michael	Sous-chef	Hamburg	37	**Grandma's Kitchen**; Children's Books	43	11. Grandma's Kitchen – Michael def. Kirsten (Ep. 1); 12. Football Clubs – Michael def. Annika N. (Ep. 1); 39. Children's Books – Jochen def. Michael (Ep. 3)	3	N/A	Episode 3
Yalun	Engineering student	Aachen	27	**Logic & Mathematics**	15	40. Airports – Kai def. Yalun (Ep. 3)	1	N/A	Episode 3
Adriano	Model & advertising agent	Saarbrücken	37	**Coaches & Officials**	13	41. Coaches & Officials – Kai def. Adriano (Ep. 3)	1	N/A	Episode 3
Ingo	Building services engineer	Halver	49	**Kitchen Utensils**	59	42. Events & Festivals – Claudia S. def. Ingo (Ep. 3)	1	N/A	Episode 3
Christin	Administrative secretary	Rostock	32	**Sports Venues**	9	43. Great Personalities – Tobias def. Christin (Ep. 3)	1	N/A	Episode 3
Siggi	Headmaster	Ingelheim	54	**Space Travel & Astronomy**	87	44. Germany – Stefan def. Siggi (Ep. 3)	1	N/A	Episode 3
Giulia	Bank clerk	Baunatal	26	**Beauty & Cosmetics**; Airlines; Hits of the 80es	88	18. Beauty & Cosmetics – Giulia def. Alex (Ep. 2); 38. Airlines – Giulia def. Michaela (Ep. 3); 45. Hits of the 80es – Stefan def. Giulia (Ep. 3)	3	N/A	Episode 3
Sven	Sales manager	Mönchengladbach	44	**"Tatort" Investigors**	1	46. English Hits – Sebastian def. Sven (Ep. 3)	1	N/A	Episode 3
Sarah W.	Germanist	Nordkirchen	42	**Royal & Noble**	55	47. Ads & Slogans – Daniel P. def. Sarah W. (Ep. 3)	1	N/A	Episode 3
Daniel P.	Treasure cacher	Hannover	39	**German Bands**; Ads & Slogans; Royal & Noble	25	37. German Bands – Daniel P. def. Tim (Ep. 3); 47. Ads & Slogans – Daniel P. def. Sarah W. (Ep. 3); 48. English – Sabrina S. def. Daniel P. (Ep. 3)	3	N/A	Episode 3
Sebastian	Pain therapist	Cologne	39	**Religions**; Creatures from Outer Space; English Hits "Tatort" Investigators	24	4. Religions – Sebastian def. Arne (Ep. 1); 22. Creatures from Outer Space – Sebastian def. Darj (Ep. 2); 46. English Hits – Sebastian def. Sven (Ep. 3); 49. "Tatort" Investigators – Sabrina S. def. Sebastian (Ep. 3)	4	N/A	Episode 3
Theresa	Agricultural worker	Schongau	25	**Musical Instruments**	44	50. Musical Instruments – Sabrina S. def. Theresa (Ep. 3)	1	N/A	Episode 3
Jochen	Managing director	Meckenbeuren	52	**Abbreviations**	51	39. Children's Books – Jochen def. Michael (Ep. 3); 51. Abbreviations – Sabrina S. def. Jochen (Ep. 3)	2	N/A	Episode 3
Sabrina S.	Translator	Baunatal	44	**English**; Royal & Noble	34	48. English – Sabrina S. def. Daniel P. (Ep. 3); 49. "Tatort" Investigators – Sabrina S. def. Sebastian (Ep. 3); 50. Musical Instruments – Sabrina S. def. Theresa (Ep. 3); 51. Abbreviations – Sabrina S. def. Jochen (Ep. 3); 52. Hits of the 90es – Carsten def. Sabrina S. (Ep. 4)	5	Episode 3; 19 spaces (€5,000)	Episode 4
Bensu	Physiotherapist	Frankfurt am Main	24	**The Human Body**	99	53. The Human Body – Johannes def. Bensu (Ep. 4)	1	N/A	Episode 4
Severine	Social education worker	Bad Bramstedt	40	**Snacks & Sweets**	5	54. Snacks & Sweets – Marie def. Severine (Ep. 4)	1	N/A	Episode 4
Marie	Dietetics student	Bonn	25	**Plants & Trees**	6	54. Snacks & Sweets – Marie def. Severine (Ep. 4); 55. Reality Stars – Carl def. Marie (Ep. 4)	2	N/A	Episode 4
Mia	Communications student	Munich	24	**Synonyms**	58	56. Synonyms – Jens def. Mia (Ep. 4)	1	N/A	Episode 4
Radek	Sports journalist	Munich	40	**TV Hosts**	86	57. Theatre & Classical Music – Janina v. F. def. Radek (Ep. 4)	1	N/A	Episode 4
Carsten	Executive consultant	Bad Vilbel	49	**Hits of the 90es** Royal & Noble	42	52. Hits of the 90es – Carsten def. Sabrina S. (Ep. 4); 58. Royal & Noble – Janina v. F. def. Carsten (Ep. 4)	2	N/A	Episode 4
Nicole	Driving instructor	Emmerich	46	**Phrases & Sayings**; Currencies	37	28. Phrases & Sayings – Nicole def. Irina (Ep. 2); 59. Currencies – Eva-Maria def. Nicole (Ep. 4)	2	N/A	Episode 4
Stefan	Key account manager	Dieblich	46	**Germany**; Space Travel & Astronomy	77	44. Germany – Stefan def. Siggi (Ep. 3); 45. Hits of the 80es – Stefan def. Giulia (Ep. 3); 60. Space Travel & Astronomy – Jan def. Stefan (Ep. 4)	3	N/A	Episode 4
Constanze	Medical student	Salz	19	**Video Games**	26	61. Pastries – Hung def. Constanze (Ep. 4)	1	N/A	Episode 4
Jennifer	IT specialist	Leipzig	29	**Apps**	70	62. Apps – Felix def. Jennifer (Ep. 4)	1	N/A	Episode 4
Volker	Lawyer	Koblenz	53	**German Actors**	62	63. Historical Events – Heiko def. Volker (Ep. 4)	1	N/A	Episode 4
Janina v. F.	MBA	Lüneburg	48	**Theatre & Classical Music**; TV Hosts	64	34. Traffic Signs – Janina v. F. def. Sonja (Ep. 2); 57. Theatre & Classical Music – Janina v. F. def. Radek (Ep. 4); 58. Royal & Noble – Janina v. F. def. Carsten (Ep. 4); 64. TV Hosts – Heiko def. Janina v. F. (Ep. 4)	4	Episode 2; 15 spaces (€5,000)	Episode 4
Claudia F.	Mini jobber	Oldenburg in Holstein	53	**Children's Songs**	38	65. Office Supplies – Jens def. Claudia F. (Ep. 4)	1	N/A	Episode 4
Daan	Communications student	Baunatal	23	**International Actors**	89	66. German Politics – Johannes def. Daan (Ep. 4)	1	N/A	Episode 4
Ulrike	Teacher	Halle	51	**Works of Art**	47	67. German Actors – Heiko def. Ulrike (Ep. 4)	1	N/A	Episode 4
Leon	Nurse	Osnabrück	26	**Eurovision Song Contest**	8	68. Chefs – Jürgen def. Leon (Ep. 5)	1	N/A	Episode 5
Theo	Gastronomer	Reinfeld	43	**International Delicacies**	97	69. Domestic Football – Patrick def. Theo (Ep. 5)	1	N/A	Episode 5
Annika J.	Reservation supervisor	Twistetal	41	**International Book Corner**	3	70. Plants & Trees – Carl def. Annika J. (Ep. 5)	1	N/A	Episode 5
Rainer	Forklift instructor	Mannheim	55	**International Musicians**	49	71. Children's Songs – Jens def. Rainer (Ep. 5)	1	N/A	Episode 5
Heiko	Househusband	Heide	47	**Historical Events**; German Actors; Works of Art	72	63. Historical Events – Heiko def. Volker (Ep. 4); 64. TV Hosts – Heiko def. Janina v. F. (Ep. 4); 67. German Actors – Heiko def. Ulrike (Ep. 4); 72. Works of Art – Susanne E. def. Heiko (Ep. 5)	4	Episode 4; 39 spaces (€5,000)	Episode 5
Hung	Physics student	Berlin	25	**Pastries**; Video Games	36	61. Pastries – Hung def. Constanze (Ep. 4); 73. Video Games – Raffaele def. Hung (Ep. 5)	2	N/A	Episode 5
Jens	Placement officer	Cologne	29	**Office Supplies**; Children's Songs; International Musicians	48	56. Synonyms – Jens def. Mia (Ep. 4); 65. Office Supplies – Jens def. Claudia F. (Ep. 4); 71. Children's Songs – Jens def. Rainer (Ep. 5); 74. International Musicians – Hanna Ilse def. Jens (Ep. 5)	4	N/A	Episode 5
Claudia S.	Speaker and author	Berlin	36	**German Musicians**; Events & Festivals; Kitchen Utensils	68	1. German Musicians – Claudia S. def. Natalia (Ep. 1); 42. Events & Festivals – Claudia S. def. Ingo (Ep. 3); 75. Kitchen Utensils – Hanna Ilse def. Claudia S. (Ep. 5)	3	N/A	Episode 5
Nadine	Police officer	Böhl-Iggelheim	40	**Famous Pairs**	73	76. Flowers & Blossoms – Susanne E. def. Nadine (Ep. 5)	1	N/A	Episode 5
Jonas H.	Author	Würzburg	40	**International Politics**	33	77. Birds – Birgit def. Jonas H. (Ep. 5)	1	N/A	Episode 5
Anna	Architecture student	Pfreimd	21	**From the Store Cupboard**	61	78. From the Store Cupboard – Simon def. Anna (Ep. 5)	1	N/A	Episode 5
Jürgen	Executive consultant	Uetikon am See	48	**Chefs**; Eurovision Song Contest	18	68. Chefs – Jürgen def. Leon (Ep. 5); 79. Eurovision Song Contest – Moritz def. Jürgen (Ep. 5)	2	N/A	Episode 5
Jasper	Portfolio manager	Dresden	33	**Sights**	41	80. Fashion Icons & Designers – Eva def. Jasper (Ep. 5)	1	N/A	Episode 5
Susanne E.	Stewardess	Wöllstein	56	**Flowers & Blossoms**; Famous Pairs	83	72. Works of Art – Susanne E. def. Heiko (Ep. 5); 76. Flowers & Blossoms – Susanne E. def. Nadine (Ep. 5); 81. Famous Pairs – Kristin def. Susanne E. (Ep. 5)	3	N/A	Episode 5
Celine	Head of sales	Ottobrunn	34	**Capitals**	2	82. International Book Corner – Carl def. Celine (Ep. 5)	1	N/A	Episode 5
Dominik	Education student	Kiel	24	**Flags**	54	83. Musicals – Kristin def. Dominik (Ep. 5)	1	N/A	Episode 5
Sandra	Retiree	Seelze	51	**German Literature**	80	33. Number Plates – Sandra def. Andreas (Ep. 2); 84. International Actors – Johannes def. Sandra (Ep. 6)	2	N/A	Episode 6
Kristin	Bank clerk	Berlin	32	**Musicals**; Flags	84	81. Famous Pairs – Kristin def. Susanne E. (Ep. 5); 83. Musicals – Kristin def. Dominik (Ep. 5); 85. Flags – Simon def. Kristin (Ep. 6)	3	Episode 5; 43 spaces (€5,000)	Episode 6
Raffaele	Binman	Hilden	44	**Handicraft**	16	73. Video Games – Raffaele def. Hung (Ep. 5); 86. Handicraft – Eva-Maria def. Raffaele (Ep. 6)	2	N/A	Episode 6
Sabine	Laboratory assistant	Munich	49	**Wardrobe**; Child Stars	57	16. Wardrobe – Sabine def. Sabrina P. (Ep. 1); 87. Mammals – Simon def. Sabine (Ep. 6)	2	N/A	Episode 6
Carl	Controller	Leipzig	25	**Reality Stars**; Plants & Trees; International Book Corner; Capitals	4	55. Reality Stars – Carl def. Marie (Ep. 4); 70. Plants & Trees – Carl def. Annika J. (Ep. 5); 82. International Book Corner – Carl def. Celine (Ep. 5); 88. Capitals – Kai def. Carl (Ep. 6)	4	N/A	Episode 6
Tobias	Product developer	Hannover	24	**Great Personalities**; Sports Venues	10	43. Great Personalities – Tobias def. Christian (Ep. 3); 89. German Language – Eva-Maria def. Tobias (Ep. 6)	2	N/A	Episode 6
Eva-Maria	Physician	Heidelberg	38	**German Language**; Sports Venues	20	59. Currencies – Eva-Maria def. Nicole (Ep. 4); 86. Handicraft – Eva-Maria def. Raffaele (Ep. 6); 89. German Language – Eva-Maria def. Tobias (Ep. 6); 90. Chemical Elements – Hanna Ilse def. Eva-Maria (Ep. 6)	4	N/A	Episode 6
Birgit	Qualified tax clerk	Schleswig	55	**Birds**; International Politics	32	77. Birds – Birgit def. Jonas H. (Ep. 5); 91. Sights – Eva def. Birgit (Ep. 6)	2	N/A	Episode 6
Hanna Ilse	Ecology student	Lüneburg	29	**Chemical Elements**; Sports Venues	39	74. International Musicians – Hanna Ilse def. Jens (Ep. 5); 75. Kitchen Utensils – Hanna Ilse def. Claudia S. (Ep. 5); 90. Chemical Elements – Hanna Ilse def. Eva-Maria (Ep. 6); 92. Sports Venues – Jan def. Hanna Ilse (Ep. 6)	4	N/A	Episode 6
Moritz	Sales manager	Wentorf	28	**Reptiles & Bugs**	7	79. Eurovision Song Contest – Moritz def. Jürgen (Ep. 5); 93. Logic & Mathematics – Kai def. Moritz (Ep. 6)	2	N/A	Episode 6
Patrick	Engineer	Flörsheim	30	**Domestic Football**; International Delicacies	96	69. Domestic Football – Patrick def. Theo (Ep. 5); 94. Child Stars – Simon def. Patrick (Ep. 6)	2	N/A	Episode 6
Felix	Event coordinator	Leipzig	33	**International Football**	60	62. Apps – Felix def. Jennifer (Ep. 4); 95. German Literature – Johannes def. Felix (Ep. 6)	2	N/A	Episode 6
Eva	Creative director	Vienna	46	**Fashion Icons & Designers**; Sights; International Politics	31	80. Fashion Icons & Designers – Eva def. Jasper (Ep. 5); 91. Sights – Eva def. Birgit (Ep. 6); 96. International Delicacies – Simon def. Eva (Ep. 6)	3	N/A	Episode 6
Simon	Bio scientist	Osnabrück	32	**Mammals**; Child Stars; International Delicacies; International Politics	71	78. From the Store Cupboard – Simon def. Anna (Ep. 5); 85. Flags – Simon def. Kristin (Ep. 6); 87. Mammals – Simon def. Sabine (Ep. 6); 94. Child Stars – Simon def. Patrick (Ep. 6); 96. International Delicacies – Simon def. Eva (Ep. 6); 97. International Politics – Kai def. Simon (Ep. 6)	6	N/A	Episode 6
Kai	Managing director	Seevetal	41	**Airports**; Logic & Mathematics; Reptiles & Bugs	14	40. Airports – Kai def. Yalun (Ep. 3); 41. Coaches & Officials – Kai def. Adriano (Ep. 3); 88. Capitals – Kai def. Carl (Ep. 6); 93. Logic & Mathematics – Kai def. Moritz (Ep. 6); 97. International Politics – Kai def. Simon (Ep. 6); 98. Reptiles & Bugs – Jan def. Kai (Ep. 6)	6	N/A	Episode 6
Johannes	Executive consultant	Weingarten	37	**German Politics**; International Actors; German Literature; International Football	100	53. The Human Body – Johannes def. Bensu (Ep. 4); 66. German Politics – Johannes def. Daan (Ep. 4); 84. International Actors – Johannes def. Sandra (Ep. 6); 95. German Literature – Johannes def. Felix (Ep. 6); 99. Fish – Jan def. Johannes (Ep. 6)	5	N/A	Episode 6
Jan	Travel agent	Cologne	39	**Fish**	79	60. Space Travel & Astronomy – Jan def. Stefan (Ep. 4); 92. Sports Venues – Jan def. Hanna Ilse (Ep. 6); 98. Reptiles & Bugs – Jan def. Kai (Ep. 6); 99. Fish – Jan def. Johannes (Ep. 6)	4	**Season Winner** **(€100,000)**	

=== Duels ===
Colour key
Contestant won the Duel
Contestant lost the Duel and was eliminated
Contestant ended up losing until the end of the episode, so the winner's space is no longer updated

==== Week 1: Top 100 (February 29) ====
First episode results
Number of the Duel	Challenger Time	Challenger	Category	Challenged	Challenged Time	Winner's Space
1	45 s	Natalia	German Musicians	Claudia S.	45 s	2
2	45 s	Timo	International Bands	Jeanette	45 s	2
3	45 s	Jeanette	Games & Board Games	Bastian	45 s	3
4	45 s	Arne	Religion	Sebastian	45 s	2
5	45 s	Trixi	Models	Guido	45 s	2
6	45 s	Trixi	Herbs & Spices	Vivien	45 s	3
7	45 s	Toni	Shopping	Mira	45 s	2
8	45 s	Toni	International Blockbusters	Kevin	45 s	3
9	45 s	Kevin	German Hits	Mike	45 s	4
10	45 s	Sarah S.	Household	Kirsten	45 s	2
11	45 s	Kirsten	Grandma's Kitchen	Michael	45 s	3
12	45 s	Michael	Football Clubs	Annika N.	45 s	4
13	45 s	Avraam	Disney Movies	Irina	45 s	2
14	45 s	Irina	World Map	Vivien	45 s	5
15	45 s	Irina	Children's Series	Susanne	45 s	6
16	45 s	Sabrina P.	Wardrobe	Sabine	45 s	2
17	45 s	Jonas	Famous Animals	Marc-Hendrik	45 s	2

==== Week 2: Top 83 (March 7) ====
Second episode results
Number of the Duel	Challenger Time	Challenger	Category	Challenged	Challenged Time	Winner's Space
18	45 s	Alex	Beauty & Cosmetics	Giulia	45 s	2
19	45 s	Kim	Vegetables	Hendrik	45 s	2
20	45 s	Kim	Technical Appliances & Gadgets	Steffen	45 s	3
21	45 s	Steffen	Social Media Stars	Darj	45 s	4
22	45 s	Darj	Creatures from Outer Space	Sebastian	45 s	6
23	45 s	Meadow	Sports	Sonja	45 s	2
24	45 s	Sonja	Means of Transport	Joel	45 s	3
25	45 s	Sonja	Harry Potter	Bastian	45 s	6
26	45 s	Martschel	Dog Breeds	Janina B.	45 s	2
27	45 s	Martschel	Mythology	Irina	45 s	8
28	45 s	Irina	Phrases & Sayings	Nicole	45 s	9
29	45 s	Jana	Beverages	Mike	45 s	5
30	45 s	Mike	Language	Ingo B.	45 s	6
31	45 s	Mike	Song Lyrics	Marc-Hendrik	45 s	8
32	45 s	Mike	Fruit	Sonja	45 s	14
33	45 s	Sandra	Number Plates	Andreas	45 s	2
34	45 s	Janina v. F.	Traffic Signs	Sonja	45 s	15

==== Week 3: Top 66 (March 14) ====
Third episode results
Number of the Duel	Challenger Time	Challenger	Category	Challenged	Challenged Time	Winner's Space
35	45 s	Tim	German Movies	Daniel V.	45 s	2
36	45 s	Tim	Athletes	Kamjar	45 s	3
37	45 s	Tim	German Bands	Daniel P.	45 s	4
38	45 s	Michaela	Airlines	Giulia	45 s	3
39	45 s	Jochen	Children's Books	Michael	45 s	5
40	45 s	Yalun	Airports	Kai	45 s	2
41	45 s	Kai	Coaches & Officials	Adriano	45 s	3
42	45 s	Ingo	Events & Festivals	Claudia S.	45 s	3
43	45 s	Christin	Great Personalities	Tobias	45 s	2
44	45 s	Siggi	Germany	Stefan	45 s	2
45	45 s	Stefan	Hits of the 80es	Giulia	45 s	5
46	45 s	Sven	English Hits	Sebastian	45 s	7
47	45 s	Sarah W.	Ads & Slogans	Daniel P.	45 s	5
48	45 s	Daniel P.	English	Sabrina S.	45 s	6
49	45 s	Sabrina S.	"Tatort" Investigators	Sebastian	45 s	13
50	45 s	Sabrina S.	Musical Instruments	Theresa	45 s	14
51	45 s	Sabrina S.	Abbreviations	Jochen	45 s	19

==== Week 4: Top 49 (March 21) ====
Fourth episode results
Number of the Duel	Challenger Time	Challenger	Category	Challenged	Challenged Time	Winner's Space
52	45 s	Sabrina S.	Hits of the 90es	Carsten	45 s	20
53	45 s	Johannes	The Human Body	Bensu	45 s	2
54	45 s	Marie	Snacks & Sweets	Severine	45 s	2
55	45 s	Marie	Reality Stars	Carl	45 s	3
56	45 s	Jens	Synoyms	Mia	45 s	2
57	45 s	Radek	Theatre & Classical Music	Janina v. F.	45 s	16
58	45 s	Janina v. F.	Royal & Noble	Carsten	45 s	36
59	45 s	Eva-Maria	Currencies	Nicole	45 s	10
60	45 s	Jan	Space Travel & Astronomy	Stefan	45 s	6
61	45 s	Constanze	Pastries	Hung	45 s	2
62	45 s	Felix	Apps	Jennifer	45 s	2
63	45 s	Volker	Historical Events	Heiko	45 s	2
64	45 s	Heiko	TV Hosts	Janina v. F.	45 s	38
65	45 s	Claudia F.	Office Supplies	Jens	45 s	3
66	45 s	Daan	German Politics	Johannes	45 s	3
67	45 s	Ulrike	German Actors	Heiko	45 s	39

==== Week 5: Top 33 (March 28) ====
Fifth episode results
Number of the Duel	Challenger Time	Challenger	Category	Challenged	Challenged Time	Winner's Space
68	45 s	Leon	Chefs	Jürgen	45 s	2
69	45 s	Theo	Domestic Football	Patrick	45 s	2
70	45 s	Annika J.	Plants & Trees	Carl	45 s	4
71	45 s	Rainer	Children's Songs	Jens	45 s	4
72	45 s	Susanne E.	Works of Art	Heiko	45 s	40
73	45 s	Raffaele	Video Games	Hung	45 s	3
74	45 s	Hanna Ilse	International Musicians	Jens	45 s	5
75	45 s	Hanna Ilse	Kitchen Utensils	Claudia S.	45 s	8
76	45 s	Nadine	Flowers & Blossoms	Susanne E.	45 s	41
77	45 s	Jonas H.	Birds	Birgit	45 s	2
78	45 s	Simon	From the Pantry	Anna	45 s	2
79	45 s	Moritz	Eurovision Song Contest	Jürgen	45 s	3
80	45 s	Jasper	Fashion Icons & Designers	Eva	45 s	2
81	45 s	Kristin	Famous Pairs	Susanne E.	45 s	42
82	45 s	Celine	International Book Corner	Carl	45 s	5
83	45 s	Dominik	Musicals	Kristin	45 s	43

==== Week 6: Top 17 (April 4) ====
Sixth episode results
Number of the Duel	Challenger Time	Challenger	Category	Challenged	Challenged Time	Winner's Space
84	45 s	Sandra	International Actors	Johannes	45 s	5
85	45 s	Simon	Flags	Kristin	45 s	45
86	45 s	Eva-Maria	Handicraft	Raffaele	45 s	13
87	45 s	Sabine	Mammals	Simon	45 s	47
88	45 s	Kai	Capitals	Carl	45 s	8
89	45 s	Tobias	German Language	Eva-Maria	45 s	15
90	45 s	Eva-Maria	Chemical Elements	Hanna Ilse	45 s	23
91	45 s	Birgit	Sights	Eva	45 s	4
92	45 s	Jan	Sports Venues	Hanna Ilse	45 s	29
93	45 s	Moritz	Logic & Mathematics	Kai	45 s	11
94	45 s	Patrick	Child Stars	Simon	45 s	49
95	45 s	Felix	German Literature	Johannes	45 s	7
96	45 s	Eva	International Delicacies	Simon	45 s	53
97	45 s	Kai	International Politics	Simon	45 s	64
98	45 s	Jan	Reptiles & Bugs	Kai	45 s	93
99	45 s	Jan	Fish	Johannes	45 s	100

== Season 2 ==
=== Contestants ===
Results (Season 2)
Name	Job	Hometown	Age	Category	Space Assignment	Duels	Duels Played	Final Duels Played	Episodes Won	Exited
Tim P.	Police helicopter pilot	Köln	45	Flying Objects	22	1. Ballermann – Sebastian L. def. Tim P. (Ep. 1)	1	N/A	N/A	Episode 1
Petra	Retiree	Berlin	61	News Anchors	33	2. News Anchors – Sebastian L. def. Petra (Ep. 1)	1	N/A	N/A	Episode 1
Laura	Health management student	Haldensleben	27	Occupations	60	3. Occupations – Birgit def. Laura (Ep. 1)	1	N/A	N/A	Episode 1
Kaddy	Public administration	Hanau	42	Superheroes	84	4. Song Lyrics – Pedram def. Kaddy (Ep. 1)	1	N/A	N/A	Episode 1
Carsten	Hair dressing teacher	Betzdorf	52	Schlager	92	5. Drugstore – Rebekka def. Carsten (Ep. 1)	1	N/A	N/A	Episode 1
Jochen	Sales representative	Oberhausen	36	Languages	6	6. Football National Teams – Alexander G. def. Jochen (Ep. 1)	1	N/A	N/A	Episode 1
Alexander G.	Train driver	Neumünster	34	Football National Teams; Languages	5	6. Football National Teams – Alexander G. def. Jochen (Ep. 1); 7. Series Intros – Jasmin def. Alexander G. (Ep. 1)	2	N/A	N/A	Episode 1
Elina	Teacher	Leipzig	33	Bestsellers	16	8. Bestsellers – Jasmin def. Elina (Ep. 1)	1	N/A	N/A	Episode 1
Caro	Fitness trainer	Beverstedt	19	Musicals	17	9. Musicals – Jasmin def. Caro (Ep. 1)	1	N/A	N/A	Episode 1
Pedram	Student teacher	Freiburg	24	Song Lyrics; Superheroes	85	4. Song Lyrics – Pedram def. Kaddy (Ep. 1); 10. Superheroes – Leslie def. Pedram (Ep. 1)	1	N/A	N/A	Episode 1
Sandra	Lecturer	Jena	50	Garden	93	11. Garden – Leslie def. Sandra (Ep. 1)	1	N/A	N/A	Episode 1
Volker	Photographer	Köln	61	Wild Animals	83	12. Wild Animals – Leslie def. Volker (Ep. 1)	1	N/A	N/A	Episode 1
Marco	Police instructor	Falkensee	46	Villains	57	13. Villains – Ali def. Marco (Ep. 1)	1	N/A	N/A	Episode 1
Nicole	Radio host	Frankenberg	34	Phrases & Sayings	30	14. Shopping – Manja def. Nicole (Ep. 1)	1	N/A	N/A	Episode 1
Manja	Project manager	Berlin	35	Shopping; Phrases & Sayings	29	14. Shopping – Manja def. Nicole (Ep. 1); 15. Pet Supplies – Drea def. Manja (Ep. 1)	2	N/A	N/A	Episode 1
Simone	Remedial teacher	Chemnitz	57	Ingredients	63	16. Ingredients – Ronny def. Simone (Ep. 1)	1	N/A	N/A	Episode 1
Ronny	Tour coordinator	Berlin	38	Movie Quotes	53	16. Ingredients – Ronny def. Simone (Ep. 1); 17. Capitals – Till def. Ronny (Ep. 1)	2	N/A	N/A	Episode 1
Leonie	Administrative clerk	Hamburg	20	Reality Stars	77	18. Flags – Anna def. Leonie (Ep. 2)	1	N/A	N/A	Episode 2
Thageeth	Physicist	Essen	26	Nature Phenomenons	37	19. Nature Phenomenons – Cedric def. Thageeth (Ep. 2)	1	N/A	N/A	Episode 2
Emma	Student	Bexbach	17	Disney	31	20. The Human Body – Michael def. Emma (Ep. 2)	1	N/A	N/A	Episode 2
Michael	Retired teacher	Braunschweig	73	The Human Body; Disney	41	20. The Human Body – Michael def. Emma (Ep. 2); 21. International Football – Andreas def. Michael (Ep. 2)	2	N/A	N/A	Episode 2
Johannes	Social education worker	Kassel	30	Bands	52	22. Bands – Andreas def. Johannes (Ep. 2)	1	N/A	N/A	Episode 2
Jasmin	Environment consultant	Berlin	34	Series Intros; Languages	15	7. Series Intros – Jasmin def. Alexander G. (Ep. 1); 8. Bestsellers – Jasmin def. Elina (Ep. 1); 9. Musicals – Jasmin def. Caro (Ep. 1); FD1. Drawer of Horror – Leslie def. Jasmin (Ep. 1); 23. Languages – Martin S. def. Jasmin (Ep. 2)	4	1	N/A	Episode 2
Britta	Train conductress	Köln	54	Recipes	100	24. Famous Children – Jessy def. Britta (Ep. 2)	1	N/A	N/A	Episode 2
Jessy	Content creator	Saarbrücken	30	Famous Children; Recipes	90	24. Famous Children – Jessy def. Britt (Ep. 2)a 25. Summer Hits – Manuel def. Jessy (Ep. 2)	2	N/A	N/A	Episode 2
Manuel	Social insurance clerk	Kornwestheim	44	Summer Hits; Recipes	99	25. Summer Hits – Manuel def. Jessy (Ep. 2); 26. International Delicacies – Steffi G. def. Manuel (Ep. 2)	2	N/A	N/A	Episode 2
Steffi G.	Feel good manager	Köln	57	International Delicacies; Recipes	98	26. International Delicacies – Steffi G. def. Manuel (Ep. 2); 27. Handicrafts – Dörte def. Steffi G. (Ep. 2)	2	N/A	N/A	Episode 2
Birgit	Retiree	Baden-Baden	65	Machines & Technical Devices	70	3. Occupations – Birgit def. Laura (Ep. 1); 28. Machines & Technical Devices – Dörte def. Birgit (Ep. 2)	2	N/A	N/A	Episode 2
Sebastian L.	Account manager	Köln	29	Ballermann; Flying Objects	32	1. Ballermann – Sebastian L. def. Tim P. (Ep. 1); 2. News Anchors – Sebastian L. def. Petra (Ep. 1); 29. Flying Objects – André def. Sebastian L. (Ep. 2)	3	N/A	N/A	Episode 2
André	Logistician	Wittenburg	45	Car Models	21	29. Flying Objects – André def. Sebastian L. (Ep. 2); 30. Disney – Andreas def. André (Ep. 2)	2	N/A	N/A	Episode 2
Pooja	Industrial engineer	Hamburg	35	Pop Meets Classic	45	31. Economy – Jessi def. Pooja (Ep. 2)	1	N/A	N/A	Episode 2
Mariela	Customs officer	Riedstadt	37	Ships	28	32. Phrases & Sayings – Drea def. Mariela (Ep. 2)	1	N/A	N/A	Episode 2
Till	Chief inspector	Berlin	31	Capitals; Movie Quotes	43	17. Capitals – Till def. Ronny (Ep. 1); 33. Movie Quotes – Julia B. def. Till (Ep. 2)	2	N/A	N/A	Episode 2
Doreen	Economist	Nienburg	26	Fine Arts	74	34. Fine Arts – Julia B. def. Doreen (Ep. 3)	1	N/A	N/A	Episode 3
Bri	Fairground vendor	Dortmund	56	Fun Fair	49	35. Fun Fair – Valentin def. Bri (Ep. 3)	1	N/A	N/A	Episode 3
Vedran	Technical college student	Pfaffenhofen an der Ilm	20	Politics	50	36. Politics – Valentin def. Vedran (Ep. 3)	1	N/A	N/A	Episode 3
Valentin	Business economist	Langenzenn	49	Actors	48	35. Fun Fair – Valentin def. Bri (Ep. 3); 36. Politics – Valentin def. Vedran (Ep. 3); 37. Coffee Party – Steffy W. def. Valentin (Ep. 3)	3	N/A	N/A	Episode 3
Dörte	ER nurse	Oldenburg	40	Handicrafts; Recipes	80	27. Handicrafts – Dörte def. Steffi G. (Ep. 2); 28. Machines & Technical Devices – Dörte def. Birgit (Ep. 2); FD2. Wedding – Dörte def. Andreas (Ep. 2); 38. Recipes – Steffy W. def. Dörte (Ep. 3)	3	1	Episode 2 (€5,000)	Episode 3
Martin S.	Linguist	Mannheim	56	One Hit Wonders	26	23. Languages – Martin S. def. Jasmin (Ep. 2); 39. One Hit Wonders – Seyma def. Martin S. (Ep. 3)	2	N/A	N/A	Episode 3
Micha	Freelance artist	Berlin	58	ESC	75	40. Summer Olympians – Holger def. Micha (Ep. 3)	1	N/A	N/A	Episode 3
Tim V.	Flight dispatcher	Koblenz	26	Car Country Codes	81	41. Schlager – Rebekka def. Tim V. (Ep. 3)	1	N/A	N/A	Episode 3
Elisa	Employment agent	Gera	34	Healthy Cooking	9	42. Sports Brands – Martin M. def. Elisa (Ep. 3)	1	N/A	N/A	Episode 3
Markus	IT consultant	Ittigen	56	Furniture	23	43. Furniture – Sabine def. Markus (Ep. 3)	1	N/A	N/A	Episode 3
Nick	Lecturer	Unterhaching	57	Artist Names	95	44. Comedians – Toralf def. Nick (Ep. 3)	1	N/A	N/A	Episode 3
Andreas	Courier rider	Magdeburg	42	International Football; Disney; Car Models	42	21. International Football – Andreas def. Michael (Ep. 2); 22. Bands – Andreas def. Johannes (Ep. 2); 30. Disney – Andreas def. André (Ep. 2); FD2. Wedding – Dörte def. Andreas (Ep. 2); 45. Car Models – Niko def. Andreas (Ep. 3)	4	1	N/A	Episode 3
Niko	Radio host	Heilbronn	28	Neue Deutsche Welle	11	45. Car Models – Niko def. Andreas (Ep. 3); 46. Streets & Squares – Julia B. def. Niko (Ep. 3)	2	N/A	N/A	Episode 3
Drea	Veterinarian assistant	Lohmar	56	Pet Supplies; Phrases & Sayings; Ships	40	15. Pet Supplies – Drea def. Manja (Ep. 1); 32. Phrases & Sayings – Drea def. Mariela (Ep. 2); 47. Ships – Miriam def. Drea (Ep. 3)	3	N/A	N/A	Episode 3
Miriam	Traffic planner	Karlsruhe	44	Skylines	27	47. Ships – Miriam def. Drea (Ep. 3); 48. Actors – Steffy W. def. Miriam (Ep. 3)	2	N/A	N/A	Episode 3
Selina	Library clerk	Langenfeld	35	Astrid Lindgren	55	49. World Map – Ali def. Selina (Ep. 3)	1	N/A	N/A	Episode 3
Ali	Recruitment consultant	München	37	World Map; Astrid Lindgren	56	13. Villains – Ali def. Marco (Ep. 1); 49. World Map – Ali def. Selina (Ep. 3); 50. Pop Meets Classic – Jessi def. Ali (Ep. 4)	3	N/A	N/A	Episode 4
Martin M.	Student teacher	Wien	26	Sports Brands; Healthy Cooking	19	42. Sports Brands – Martin M. def. Elisa (Ep. 3); 51. Healthy Cooking – Karin def. Martin M. (Ep. 4)	2	N/A	N/A	Episode 4
Helena	Business student	Aßlar	24	Prizes & Awards	68	52. Famous Women – Nathalie def. Helena (Ep. 4)	1	N/A	N/A	Episode 4
Nathalie	Migration counselor	Hamburg	30	Famous Women; Prizes & Awards	69	52. Famous Women – Nathalie def. Helena (Ep. 4); 53. Skylines – Steffy W. def. Nathalie (Ep. 4)	2	N/A	N/A	Episode 4
Anne	IT freelancer	Metzingen	40	Mental Arithmetic	79	54. Mental Arithmetic – Steffy W. def. Anne (Ep. 4)	1	N/A	N/A	Episode 4
Niklas	Student teacher	Schmelz	25	Sports	47	55. Sports – Steffy W. def. Niklas (Ep. 4)	1	N/A	N/A	Episode 4
Emre	Administrative specialist	Duisburg	37	Symbols	61	56. Urban Districts – Jörg def. Emre (Ep. 4)	1	N/A	N/A	Episode 4
Jörg	Deputy headmaster	near Celle	56	Urban Districts; Symbols	51	56. Urban Districts – Jörg def. Emre (Ep. 4); 57. Neue Deutsche Welle – Julia B. def. Jörg (Ep. 4)	2	N/A	N/A	Episode 4
Tino	Civil servant	Bad Sülze	36	Airport	14	58. Legendary Looks – Clive def. Tino (Ep. 4)	1	N/A	N/A	Episode 4
Sebastian C.	Chemist	Dortmund	46	Physics	87	59. Physics – Doro def. Sebastian C. (Ep. 4)	1	N/A	N/A	Episode 4
Diana	Nursery teacher in training	Jena	50	ABBA	67	60. Fairytales – Stefan M. def. Diana (Ep. 4)	1	N/A	N/A	Episode 4
Jessi	Student teacher	Bayreuth	22	Economy; Pop Meets Classic; Astrid Lindgren	44	31. Economy – Jessi def. Pooja (Ep. 2); 50. Pop Meets Classic – Jessi def. Ali (Ep. 4); 61. Astrid Lindgren – Stefan M. def. Jessi (Ep. 4)	3	N/A	N/A	Episode 4
Stefan M.	Copywriter	Wien	53	Fairytales; ABBA	66	60. Fairytales – Stefan M. def. Diana (Ep. 4); 61. Astrid Lindgren – Stefan M. def. Jessi (Ep. 4); 62. Symbols – Julia B. def. Stefan M. (Ep. 4)	3	N/A	N/A	Episode 4
Guido	Application manager	Koblenz	55	Ancient World	25	63. American Sports – Aylin def. Guido (Ep. 4)	1	N/A	N/A	Episode 4
Julia B.	Copywriter	München	57	Streets & Squares; Neue Deutsche Welle; Symbols; ABBA	73	33. Movie Quotes – Julia B. def. Till (Ep. 2); 34. Fine Arts – Julia B. def. Doreen (Ep. 3); 46. Streets & Squares – Julia B. def. Niko (Ep. 3); FD3. Mirror, Mirror – Steffy W. def. Julia B. (Ep. 3); 57. Neue Deutsche Welle – Julia B. def. Jörg (Ep. 4); 62. Symbols – Julia B. def. Stefan M. (Ep. 4); 64. ABBA – David def. Julia B. (Ep. 4)	6	1	N/A	Episode 4
Sabine	Geriatric nurse	Reutlingen	53	International Blockbusters	13	43. Furniture – Sabine def. Markus (Ep. 3); 65. International Blockbusters – David def. Sabine (Ep. 4)	2	N/A	N/A	Episode 4
David	Robotics student	Darmstadt	24	Star Wars	58	64. ABBA – David def. Julia B. (Ep. 4); 65. International Blockbusters – David def. Sabine (Ep. 4); FD4. In the Stadium – Steffy W. def. David (Ep. 4); 66. Star Wars – Annette def. David (Ep. 5)	3	1	N/A	Episode 5
Annette	Law clerk	near Hof	59	Religion	72	66. Star Wars – Annette def. David (Ep. 5); 67. Religion – Norman def. Annette (Ep. 5)	2	N/A	N/A	Episode 5
Aylin	Journalist	Freising	24	American Sports; Ancient World	35	63. American Sports – Aylin def. Guido (Ep. 4); 68. Ancient World – Norman def. Aylin (Ep. 5)	2	N/A	N/A	Episode 5
Kati	Early retiree	Eutin	59	70es Disco	39	69. Police Cars – Cedric def. Kati (Ep. 5)	1	N/A	N/A	Episode 5
Nicolas	IT consultant	Stolberg	37	Breakfast	3	70. Breakfast – Julia T. def. Nicolas (Ep. 5)	1	N/A	N/A	Episode 5
Julia T.	Customs officer	München	37	Sports History	2	70. Breakfast – Julia T. def. Nicolas (Ep. 5); 71. Sporting Equipment – Norman def. Julia T. (Ep. 5)	2	N/A	N/A	Episode 5
Steffy W.	Warehouse logistics specialist	Kaufbeuren	45	Coffee Party; Actors; Skylines; Prizes & Awards	59	37. Coffee Party – Steffy W. def. Valentin (Ep. 3); 38. Recipes – Steffy W. def. Dörte (Ep. 3); 48. Actors – Steffy W. def. Miriam (Ep. 3); FD3. Mirror, Mirror – Steffy W. def. Julia B. (Ep. 3); 53. Skylines – Steffy W. def. Nathalie (Ep. 4); 54. Mental Arithmetic – Steffy W. def. Anne (Ep. 4); 55. Sports – Steffy W. def. Niklas (Ep. 4); FD4. In the Stadium – Steffy W. def. David (Ep. 4); 72. Prizes & Awards – Enno def. Steffy W. (Ep. 5)	7	2	Episode 3 Episode 4 (€10,000)	Episode 5
Toralf	Self-employed	Wolfsburg	46	Comedians; Artist Names	96	44. Comedians – Toralf def. Nick (Ep. 3); 73. Artist Names – Alex def. Toralf (Ep. 5)	2	N/A	N/A	Episode 5
Norman	Real estate agent	Wernigerode	40	Sporting Equipment; Sports History	54	67. Religion – Norman def. Annette (Ep. 5); 68. Ancient World – Norman def. Aylin (Ep. 5); 71. Sporting Equipment – Norman def. Julia T. (Ep. 5); 74. Sports History – Gotti def. Norman (Ep. 5)	4	N/A	N/A	Episode 5
Alexander Z.	Federal volunteer	Nörvenich	19	Luxury	88	75. Luxury – Christoph def. Alexander Z. (Ep. 5)	1	N/A	N/A	Episode 5
Morayo	Head of Department	Winsen (Luhe)	23	Beer Brands	8	76. Camping – Karin def. Morayo (Ep. 5)	1	N/A	N/A	Episode 5
Rebekka	Bank clerk	Brüggen	34	Drugstore; Schlager; Car Country Codes	91	5. Drugstore – Rebekka def. Carsten (Ep. 1); 41. Schlager – Rebekka def. Tim V. (Ep. 3); 77. Car Country Codes – Tanja def. Rebakka (Ep. 5)	3	N/A	N/A	Episode 5
Mario	Marketing manager	Wernigerode	34	Baby Store	46	78. Magnificent Buildings – Gotti def. Mario (Ep. 5)	1	N/A	N/A	Episode 5
Karin	Daycare center manager	München	63	Camping; Beer Brands	10	51. Healthy Cooking – Karin def. Martin M. (Ep. 4); 76. Camping – Karin def. Morayo (Ep. 5); 79. Beer Brands – Stefan S. def. Karin (Ep. 5)	3	N/A	N/A	Episode 5
Stefan S.	Cactus gardener	Zweibrücken	46	Bodies of Water	20	79. Beer Brands – Stefan S. def. Karin (Ep. 5); 80. Detectives & Co. – Enno def. Stefan S. (Ep. 5)	2	N/A	N/A	Episode 5
Gotti	Exoskeleton salesman	Andorf	53	Magnificent Buildings; Baby Market	12	74. Sports History – Gotti def. Norman (Ep. 5); 78. Magnificent Buildings – Gotti def. Mario (Ep. 5); 81. Baby Market – Christina def. Gotti (Ep. 5)	3	N/A	N/A	Episode 5
Christina	Accountant	Spiesen-Elversberg	46	Doctors	37	81. Baby Market – Christina def. Gotti (Ep. 5); 82. World Champions – Dean def. Christina (Ep. 5)	2	N/A	N/A	Episode 5
Dean	Tourism manager	Grevenbroich	25	World Champions; Doctors	64	82. World Champions – Dean def. Christina (Ep. 5); FD5. Differences – Dean def. Enno (Ep. 5); 83. Reality Stars – Anna def. Dean (Ep. 6)	2	1	Episode 5 (€5,000)	Episode 6
Vera	PhD student	Dortmund	32	Marine Animals	65	84. ESC – Holger def. Vera (Ep. 6)	1	N/A	N/A	Episode 6
Anna	Industrial management assistant	Eitting	24	Flags; Reality Stars; Doctors	78	18. Flags – Anna def. Leonie (Ep. 2); 83. Reality Stars – Anna def. Dean (Ep. 6); 85. Doctors – Sven def. Anna (Ep. 6)	3	N/A	N/A	Episode 6
Betty	Veterinary assistant	Reutlingen	57	Ex Pairs	1	86. Mascots – Sven def. Betty (Ep. 6)	1	N/A	N/A	Episode 6
Sven	Real estate agent	Norderstedt	29	Mascots; Ex Pairs	4	85. Doctors – Sven def. Anna (Ep. 6); 86. Mascots – Sven def. Betty (Ep. 6); 87. Farm – Léonard def. Sven (Ep. 6)	3	N/A	N/A	Episode 6
Enno	Industrial business administrator	Lauenburg	54	Detectives & Co. Bodies of Water	18	72. Prizes & Awards – Enno def. Steffy W. (Ep. 5); 80. Detectives & Co. – Enno def. Stefan S. (Ep. 5); FD5. Differences – Dean def. Enno (Ep. 5); 88. Bodies of Water – Léonard def. Enno (Ep. 6)	3	1	N/A	Episode 6
Doro	Veterinarian	Sundern	58	Forest	97	59. Physics – Doro def. Sebastian C. (Ep. 4); 89. Forest – Léonard def. Doro (Ep. 6)	2	N/A	N/A	Episode 6
Alex	Graduate business economist	Bad Oldesloe	56	Politicians	86	73. Artist Names – Alex def. Toralf (Ep. 5); 90. Politicians – Léonard def. Alex (Ep. 6)	2	N/A	N/A	Episode 6
Mary	Business student	Berlin	19	Social Media	62	91. Social Media – Léonard def. Mary (Ep. 6)	1	N/A	N/A	Episode 6
Léonard	Farmer	near Uelzen	46	Farm; Ex Pairs	34	87. Farm – Léonard def. Sven (Ep. 6); 88. Bodies of Water – Léonard def. Enno (Ep. 6); 89. Forest – Léonard def. Doro (Ep. 6); 90. Politicians – Léonard def. Alex (Ep. 6); 91. Social Media – Léonard def. Mary (Ep. 6); 92. German Language – Katja def. Léonard (Ep. 6)	6	N/A	N/A	Episode 6
Katja	HR manager	Erkrath	34	German Language; Ex Pairs	71	92. German Language – Katja def. Léonard (Ep. 6); 93. Royal & Noble – Tanja def. Katja (Ep. 6)	2	N/A	N/A	Episode 6
Christoph	Purchaser	Neunkirchen	37	Top Goalscorers	89	75. Luxury – Christoph def. Alexander Z. (Ep. 5); 94. Ex Pairs – Tanja def. Christoph (Ep. 6)	2	N/A	N/A	Episode 6
Tanja	Registrar	Georgsmarienhütte	48	Royal & Noble; Ex Pairs; Top Goalscorers	82	77. Car Country Codes – Tanja def. Rebekka (Ep. 5); 93. Royal & Noble – Tanja def. Katja (Ep. 6); 94. Ex Pairs – Tanja def. Christoph (Ep. 6); 95. 70es Disco – Cedric def. Tanja (Ep. 6)	4	N/A	N/A	Episode 6
Cedric	Analyst	Witten	35	Police Cars; 70es Disco; Top Goalscorers	38	19. Nature Phenomenons – Cedric def. Thageeth (Ep. 2); 69. Police Cars – Cedric def. Kati (Ep. 5); 95. 70es Disco – Cedric def. Tanja (Ep. 6); 96. Top Goalscorers – Holger def. Cedric (Ep. 6)	4	N/A	N/A	Episode 6
Holger	Qualified tax clerk	Peine	36	Summer Olympians; ESC; Marine Animals	76	40. Summer Olympians – Holger def. Micha (Ep. 3); 84. ESC – Holger def. Vera (Ep. 6); 96. Top Goalscorers – Holger def. Cedric (Ep. 6); 97. Airport – Clive def. Holger (Ep. 6)	4	N/A	N/A	Episode 6
Clive	Retired chief steward	near Marburg	56	Legendary Looks; Airport; Marine Animals	24	58. Legendary Looks – Clive def. Tino (Ep. 4); 97. Airport – Clive def. Holger (Ep. 6); 98. Front Singers – Seyma def. Clive (Ep. 6)	3	N/A	N/A	Episode 6
Seyma	Language student	Hennef	38	Front Singers; Marine Animals	7	39. One Hit Wonders – Seyma def. Martin S. (Ep. 3); 98. Front Singers – Seyma def. Clive (Ep. 6); 99. Marine Animals – Leslie def. Seyma (Ep. 6)	3	N/A	N/A	Episode 6
Leslie	Motorsports engineer	Mülheim an der Ruhr	29	Car Parts	94	10. Superheroes – Leslie def. Pedram (Ep. 1); 11. Garden – Leslie def. Sandra (Ep. 1); 12. Wild Animals – Leslie def. Volker (Ep. 1); FD1. Drawer of Horror – Leslie def. Jasmin (Ep. 1); 99. Marine Animals – Leslie def. Seyma (Ep. 6)	4	1	Episode 1 & Season Winner (€105,000)	

=== Duels ===
Colour key
Contestant won the Duel
Contestant won 3 Duels in a row and an advantage of 5 seconds to use in a future round at their own choice
Contestant lost the Duel and was eliminated
Contestant won the Final Duel of the episode, winning the prize of €5,000
Contestant lost the Final Duel of the episode, but continued in the game
Contestant ended up losing until the end of the episode, so the winner's space is no longer updated

==== Week 1: Top 100 (April 10) ====
First episode results
Number of the Duel	Challenger Time	Challenger	Category	Challenged	Challenged Time	Winner's Space
1	45 s	Tim P.	Ballermann	Sebastian L.	45 s	2
2	45 s	Sebastian L.	News Anchors	Petra	45 s	3
3	45 s	Birgit	Occupations	Laura	45 s	2
4	45 s	Kaddy	Song Lyrics	Pedram	45 s	2
5	45 s	Carsten	Drugstore	Rebekka	45 s	2
6	45 s	Jochen	Football National Teams	Alexander G.	45 s	2
7	45 s	Alexander G.	Series Intros	Jasmin	45 s	3
8	45 s	Jasmin	Bestsellers	Elina	45 s	4
9	45 s	Jasmin	Musicals	Caro	45 s	5
10	45 s	Leslie	Superheroes	Pedram	45 s	3
11	45 s	Leslie	Garden	Sandra	45 s	4
12	45 s	Leslie	Wild Animals	Volker	45 s	5
13	45 s	Ali	Villains	Marco	45 s	2
14	45 s	Nicole	Shopping	Manja	45 s	2
15	45 s	Manja	Pet Supplies	Drea	45 s	3
16	45 s	Ronny	Ingredients	Simone	45 s	2
17	45 s	Ronny	Capitals	Till	45 s	3
Final Duel 1	45 s	Leslie (Note: Although there are no "Challenger" or "Challenged" contestants in the Final Duel, the assumed contestant as "Challenger" was the contestant with the lesser amount spaces and therefore played first in the duel.)	Drawer of Horror	Jasmin	45 s	–

==== Week 2: Top 83 (April 17) ====
Second episode results
Number of the Duel	Challenger Time	Challenger	Category	Challenged	Challenged Time	Winner's Space
18	45 s	Leonie	Flags	Anna	45 s	2
19	45 s	Cedric	Nature Phenomenons	Thageeth	45 s	2
20	45 s	Emma	The Human Body	Michael	45 s	2
21	45 s	Michael	International Football	Andreas	45 s	3
22	45 s	Andreas	Bands	Johannes	45 s	4
23	45 s	Martin S.	Languages	Jasmin	50 s	6
24	45 s	Britta	Famous Children	Jessy	45 s	2
25	45 s	Jessy	Summer Hits	Manuel	45 s	3
26	45 s	Manuel	International Delicacies	Steffi G.	45 s	4
27	45 s	Steffi G.	Handicrafts	Dörte	45 s	5
28	45 s	Dörte	Machines & Technical Devices	Birgit	45 s	7
29	45 s	André	Flying Objects	Sebastian L.	45 s	4
30	45 s	André	Disney	Andreas	45 s	8
31	45 s	Pooja	Economy	Jessi	45 s	2
32	45 s	Mariela	Phrases & Sayings	Drea	45 s	4
33	45 s	Julia B.	Movie Quotes	Till	45 s	4
Final Duel 2	45 s	Dörte	Wedding	Andreas	45 s	–

==== Week 3: Top 67 (April 24) ====
Third episode results
Number of the Duel	Challenger Time	Challenger	Category	Challenged	Challenged Time	Winner's Space
34	45 s	Julia B.	Fine Arts	Doreen	45 s	5
35	45 s	Valentin	Fun Fair	Bri	45 s	2
36	45 s	Valentin	Politics	Vedran	45 s	3
37	45 s	Valentin	Coffee Party	Steffy W.	45 s	4
38	45 s	Steffy W.	Recipes	Dörte	45 s	11
39	45 s	Seyma	One Hit Wonders	Martin S.	45 s	7
40	45 s	Micha	Summer Olympians	Holger	45 s	2
41	45 s	Tim V.	Schlager	Rebekka	45 s	3
42	45 s	Elisa	Sports Brands	Martin M.	45 s	2
43	45 s	Sabine	Furniture	Markus	45 s	2
44	45 s	Nick	Comedians	Toralf	45 s	2
45	45 s	Niko	Car Models	Andreas	45 s	9
46	45 s	Niko	Streets & Squares	Julia B.	45 s	14
47	45 s	Miriam	Ships	Drea	45 s	5
48	45 s	Miriam	Actors	Steffy W.	45 s	16
49	45 s	Selina	World Map	Ali	45 s	3
Final Duel 3	45 s	Julia B.	Mirror, Mirror	Steffy W.	45 s	–

==== Week 4: Top 51 (May 1) ====
Fourth episode results
Number of the Duel	Challenger Time	Challenger	Category	Challenged	Challenged Time	Winner's Space
50	45 s	Ali	Pop Meets Classic	Jessi	45 s	5
51	45 s	Karin	Healthy Cooking	Martin M.	45 s	3
52	45 s	Helena	Famous Women	Nathalie	45 s	2
53	45 s	Nathalie	Skylines	Steffy W.	45 s	18
54	45 s	Steffy W.	Mental Arithmetic	Anne	45 s	19
55	45 s	Steffy W.	Sports	Niklas	45 s	20
56	45 s	Emre	Urban Districts	Jörg	45 s	2
57	45 s	Jörg	Neue Deutsche Welle	Julia B.	45 s	16
58	45 s	Tino	Legendary Looks	Clive	45 s	2
59	45 s	Doro	Physics	Sebastian C.	45 s	2
60	45 s	Diana	Fairytales	Stefan M.	45 s	2
61	45 s	Stefan M.	Astrid Lindgren	Jessi	45 s	7
62	45 s	Stefan M.	Symbols	Julia B.	45 s	23
63	45 s	Guido	American Sports	Aylin	45 s	2
64	45 s	David	ABBA	Julia B.	45 s	24
65	45 s	David	International Blockbusters	Sabine	45 s	26
Final Duel 4	45 s	Steffy W.	In the Stadium	David	45 s	–

==== Week 5: Top 35 (May 8) ====
Fifth episode results
Number of the Duel	Challenger Time	Challenger	Category	Challenged	Challenged Time	Winner's Space
66	45 s	Annette	Star Wars	David	45 s	27
67	45 s	Norman	Religion	Annette	45 s	28
68	45 s	Norman	Ancient World	Aylin	45 s	30
69	45 s	Kati	Police Cars	Cedric	45 s	3
70	45 s	Julia T.	Breakfast	Nicolas	45 s	2
71	45 s	Julia T.	Sporting Equipment	Norman	45 s	32
72	45 s	Enno	Prizes & Awards	Steffy W.	50 s	21
73	45 s	Alex	Artist Names	Toralf	45 s	3
74	45 s	Gotti	Sports History	Norman	45 s	33
75	45 s	Christoph	Luxury	Alexander Z.	45 s	2
76	45 s	Morayo	Camping	Karin	45 s	4
77	45 s	Tanja	Car Country Codes	Rebekka	45 s	4
78	45 s	Mario	Magnificent Buildings	Gotti	45 s	34
79	45 s	Stefan S.	Beer Brands	Karin	45 s	5
80	45 s	Stefan S.	Detectives & Co.	Enno	45 s	26
81	45 s	Christina	Baby Market	Gotti	45 s	35
82	45 s	Christina	World Champions	Dean	45 s	36
Final Duel 5	45 s	Enno	Differences	Dean	45 s	–

==== Week 6: Top 18 (May 15) ====
Sixth episode results
Number of the Duel	Challenger Time	Challenger	Category	Challenged	Challenged Time	Winner's Space
83	45 s	Dean	Reality Stars	Anna	45 s	38
84	45 s	Vera	ESC	Holger	45 s	3
85	45 s	Sven	Doctors	Anna	45 s	39
86	45 s	Betty	Mascots	Sven	45 s	40
87	45 s	Sven	Farm	Léonard	45 s	41
88	45 s	Léonard	Bodies of Water	Enno	45 s	67
89	45 s	Léonard	Forest	Doro	45 s	69
90	45 s	Léonard	Politicians	Alex	45 s	72
91	50 s	Léonard	Social Media	Mary	45 s	73
92	45 s	Léonard	German Language	Katja	45 s	74
93	45 s	Katja	Royal & Noble	Tanja	45 s	78
94	45 s	Christoph	Ex Pairs	Tanja	45 s	80
95	45 s	Tanja	70es Disco	Cedric	45 s	83
96	45 s	Holger	Top Goalscorers	Cedric	45 s	86
97	45 s	Holger	Airport	Clive	45 s	88
98	45 s	Clive	Front Singers	Seyma	45 s	95
99	45 s	Seyma	Marine Animals	Leslie	50 s	100

== Reception ==
Season	Episode	Viewers in million (overall)	Share (overall)	Viewers in million (14-49)	Share (14-49)
1	1	1.49	6.0%	0.41	7.7%
1	2	1.12	4.5%	0.27	4.8%
1	3	1.34	5.4%	0.42	7.8%
1	4	1.37			7.6%
1	5	1.21			8.4%
1	6	1.41	5.7%	0.48	9.6%
2	7	1.16	5.1%	0.42	8.7%
2	8	1.08	4.7%	0.40	9.0%
2	9	0.92	3.9%	0.33	6.9%
2	10	0.95	4.5%	0.33	8.2%
2	11	1.10	4.9%	0.39	8.7%
