= Lokaltermin (TV series) =

- Starring: Hans Söhnker
- Country of origin: Germany

Lokaltermin is a German television series.

== See also ==
- Beschlossen und verkündet (1975)
- List of German television series
