= The Masked Dancer (German TV series) =

- Also known as: TMD
- Genre: Reality television Game show
- Based on: The Masked Dancer
- Presented by: Matthias Opdenhövel
- Starring: Alexander Klaws; Steven Gätjen
- Country of origin: Germany
- Original language: German
- No. of seasons: 1
- No. of episodes: 4

Production
- Production locations: MMC Studios, Cologne
- Running time: approx. 180 to 200 minutes per episode (including commercials)
- Production company: EndemolShine Germany

Original release
- Network: ProSieben
- Release: 6 January 2022 – present

Related
- Masked Singer franchise; The Masked Singer

The Masked Dancer is a German reality competition television series that premiered on ProSieben on 6 January 2022, based on the American television series of the same name. Like The Masked Singer's format, celebrity contestants wear head-to-toe costumes and face masks that conceal their identities. Matthias Opdenhövel hosts the show, with Alexander Klaws and Steven Gätjen serving as panelists.

The winner of the first season was Oli.P as "Affe".

== Production ==
In June 2021, EndemolShine Germany announced a dancing spinoff series that shares the same name of the American version, following the success of its sister show The Masked Singer. In November 2021, it was announced that ProSieben would broadcast the show, the same channel who produced The Masked Singer.

=== Format ===
In four live episode, seven celebrities such as singers, actors or athletes in full-body costumes compete against each other with a choreography. Before the respective performance, a short video is shown, in which hidden clues to the identity of the costumed dancers are contained. Unlike The Masked Singer, there will be more evidence in The Masked Dancer.

The viewers voting took place exclusively via the ProSieben-app, after each Duel or Truel. The winners may keep the mask on and participate in the next episode. With repeated or without repeated singing, the losers have to wait for the final vote of the respective show. The singer with the fewest votes has to take off his mask and leave the show. The others continue to participate.

After each appearance, the two panelist members – three during the first season – and a guest member of the advice team who changes from episode to episode express their guess as to who is under the mask. The panelist team also asks a question to almost every singer, who only answers vaguely or evasively. Before making any decision, the panelist team makes an assumption after the voting has ended, for whom it will be tight or who will be eliminated. Before unmasking, the celebrities are once more asked to give their final guess about who is beneath the mask.

The opening theme is "Who Are You" by The Who. After a decision, a section of the song "Baby" by Bakermat.

=== Filming ===
Production films in Cologne at MMC Studios where The Masked Singer has also filmed.

== Panelists and host ==
The Masked Dancer panelists and host

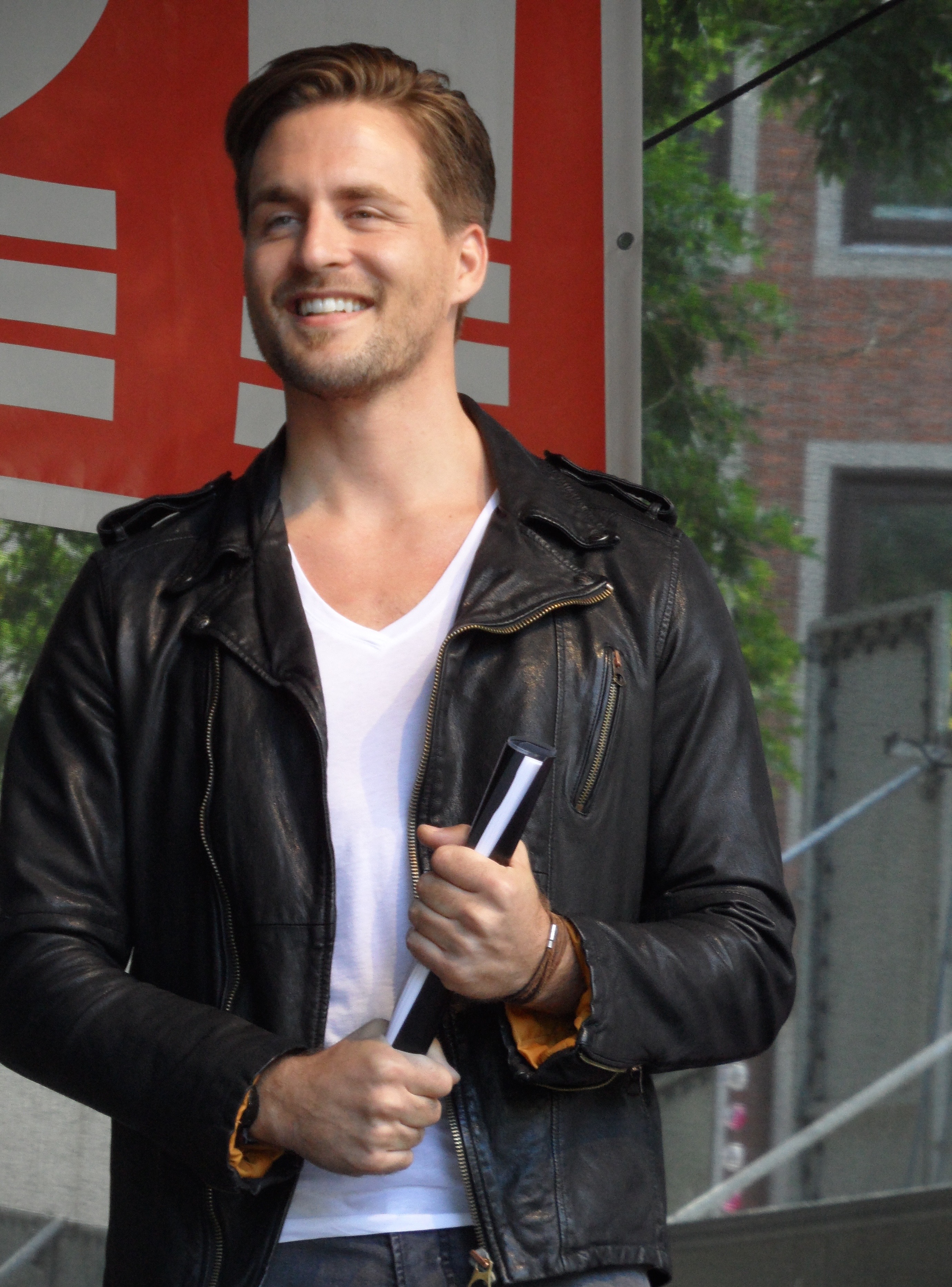
Alexander Klaws

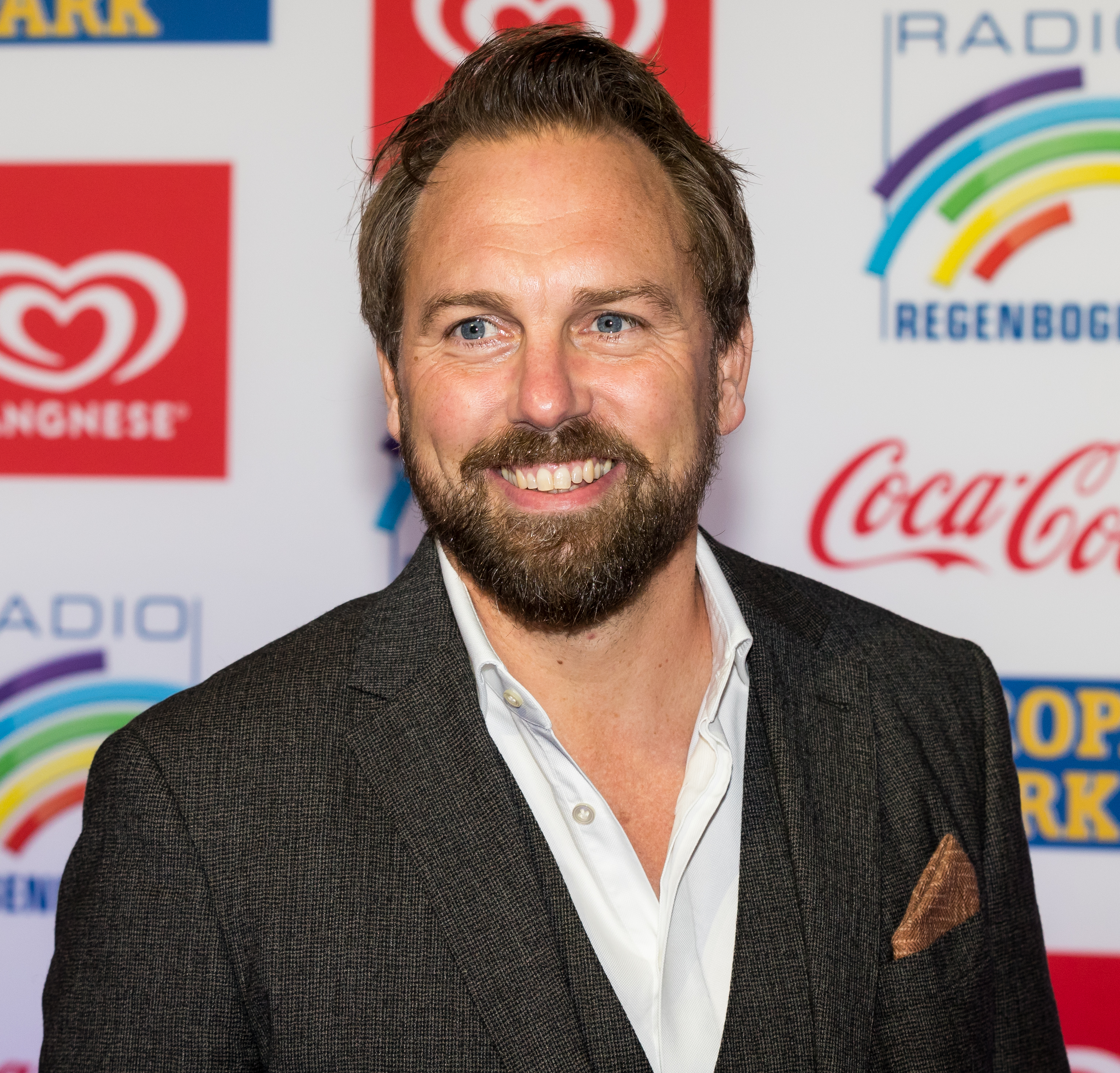
Steven Gätjen

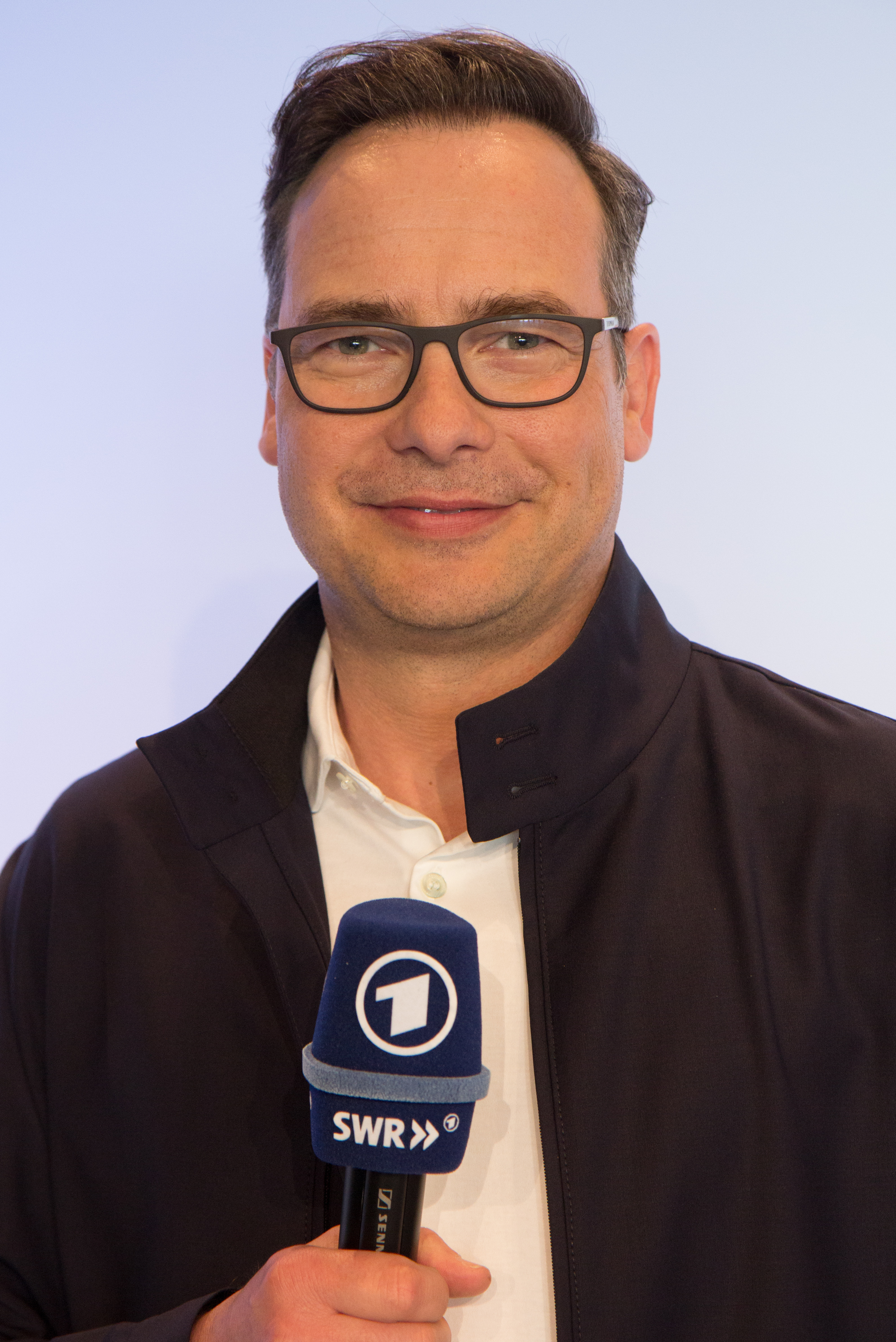
Matthias Opdenhövel

Like in the original version, Matthias Opdenhövel would host the show. On 2 January 2022, it was announced that the panel would consist of singer Alexander Klaws and presenter and actor Steven Gätjen.

=== Guest panelists ===
Season 1 guest panelists

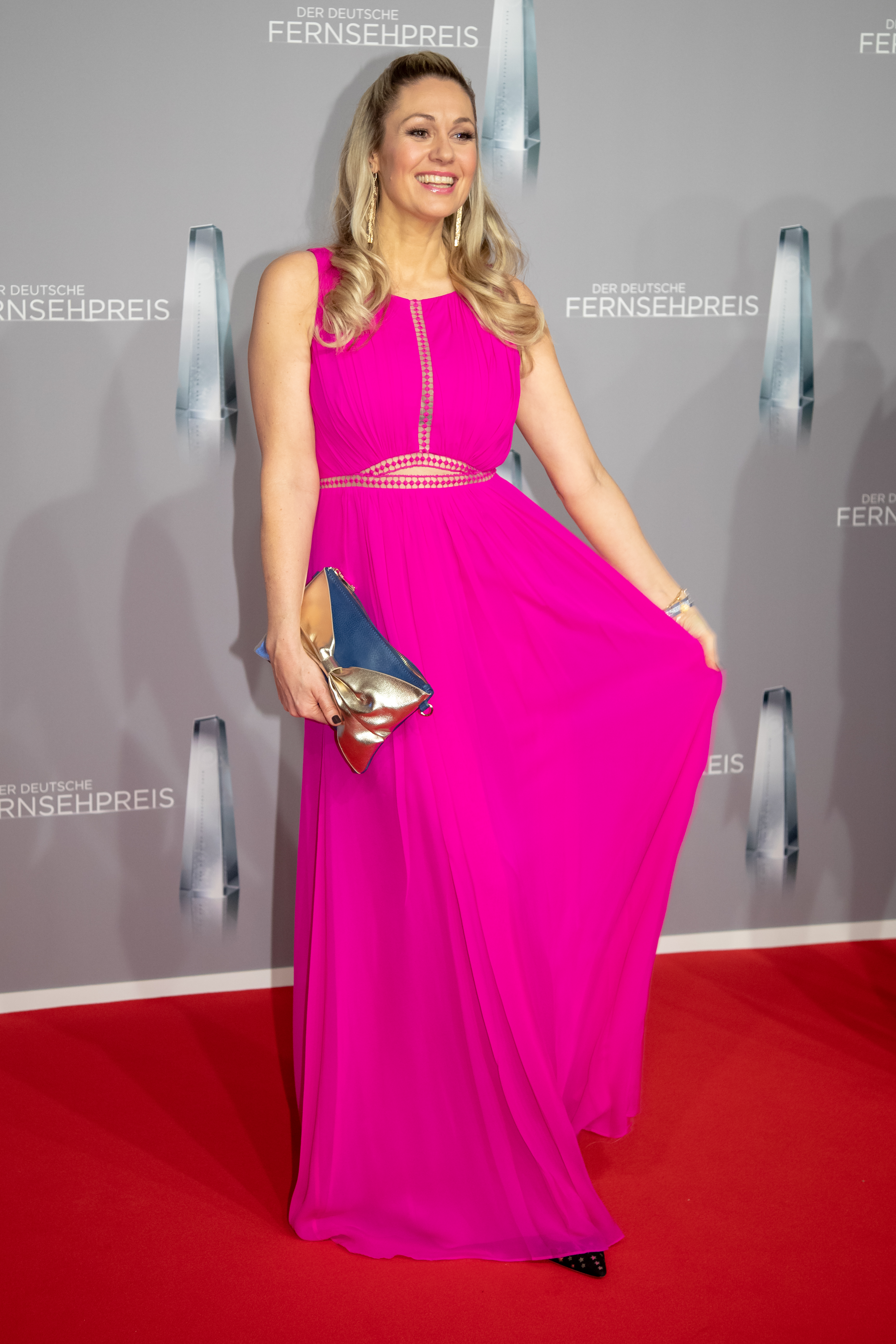
Ruth Moschner (episode 1)

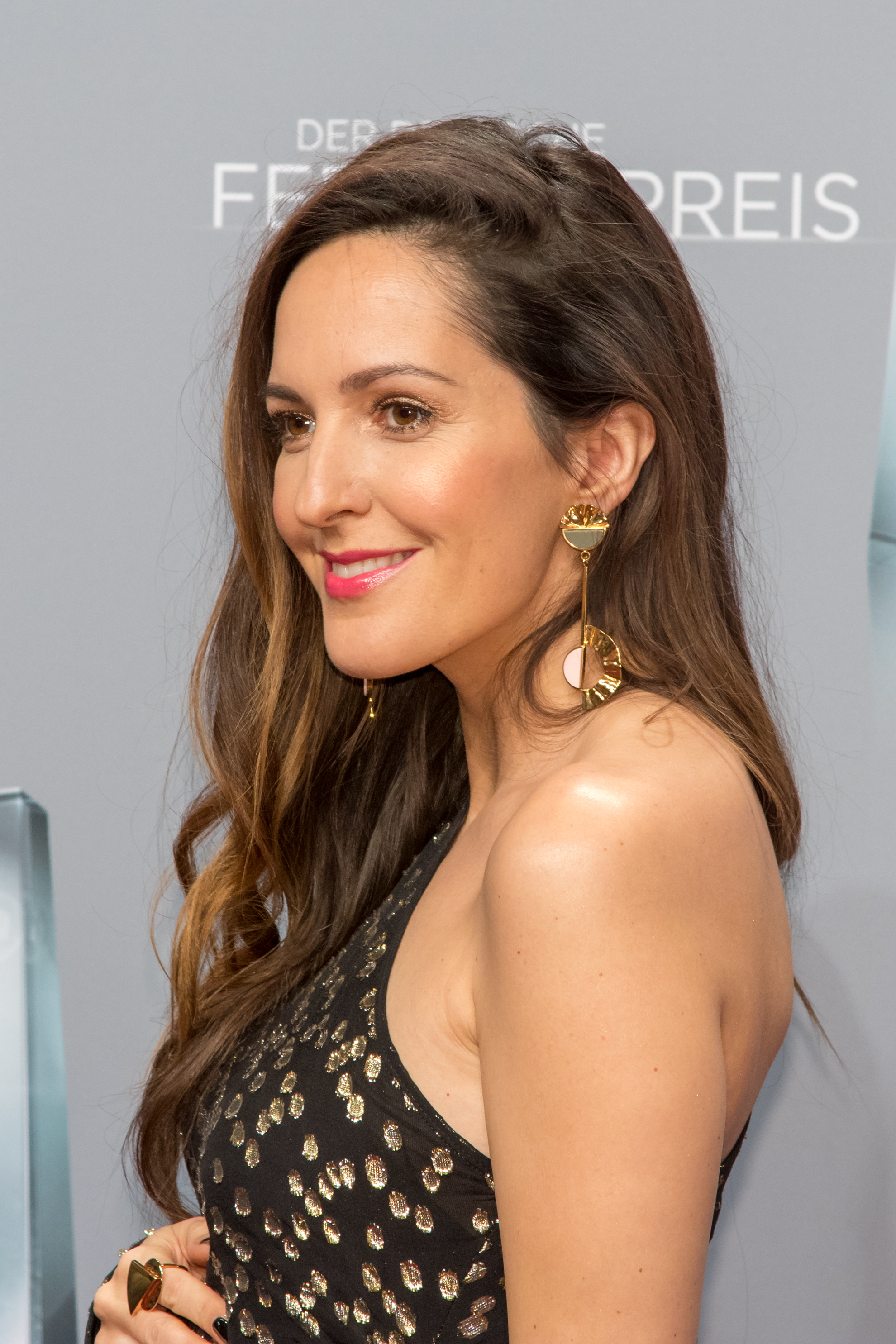
Johanna Klum (episode 2)

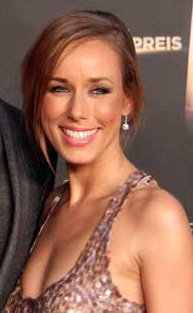
Annemarie Carpendale (episode 3)

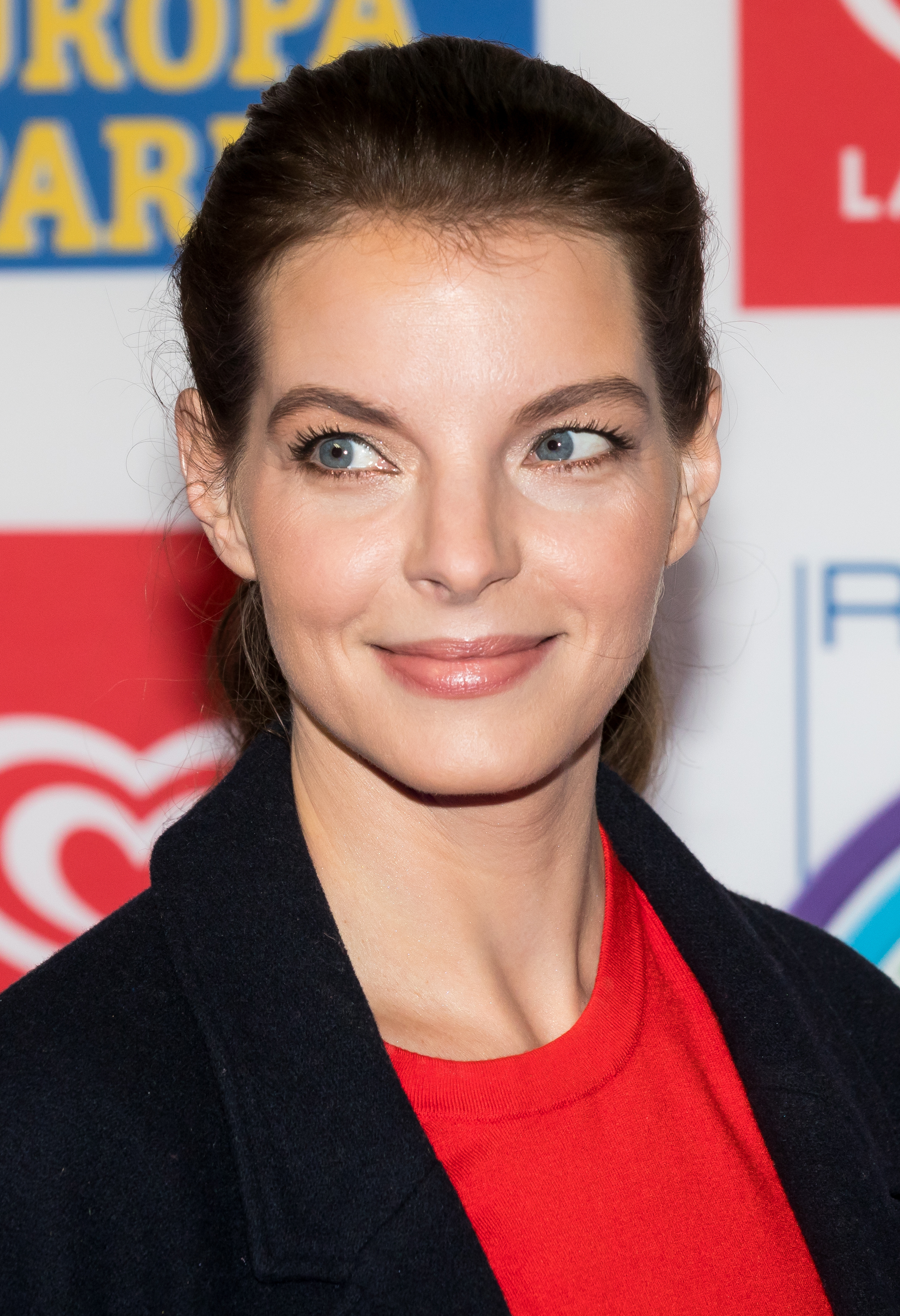
Yvonne Catterfeld (episode 4)

Like in The Masked Singer, various guest panelists appeared as the third judge in the judging panel for one episode. These guest panelists included:

Episode	Name	Notability	Ref.
1	Ruth Moschner	TV Presenter	
2	Johanna Klum	TV Presenter & Singer	
3	Annemarie Carpendale	TV Presenter	
4	Yvonne Catterfeld	Singer	

== Contestants ==
The show included 7 contestants. On 23 December 2021 the first three costumes were announced. On 4 January 2022 two more costumes were announced. The last two costumes were announced in the first live show.

Results
Stage name	Celebrity	Notability	Live Episodes				
Stage name	Celebrity	Notability	1	2	3	4	
Stage name	Celebrity	Notability	1	2	3	A	B
Affe "Monkey"	Oli.P	Singer	WIN	WIN	WIN	WIN	WINNER
Zottel "Shaggy"	Marlene Lufen	Presenter	WIN	RISK	RISK	WIN	RUNNER-UP
Buntstift "Crayon"	Timur Bartels	Actor	WIN	RISK	WIN	OUT	
Maus "Mouse"	Wolke Hegenbarth	Actress	RISK	WIN	WIN	OUT	
Maximum Power	Eloy de Jong	Singer	RISK	RISK	OUT		
Schaf "Sheep"	Axel Schulz	Former Boxer	RISK	OUT			
Glühwürmchen "Firefly"	Ute Lemper	Singer	OUT				

The masked dancer won their face-off and remained in the competition.
The masked dancer lost their face-off and was in the bottom four/three/two, but was not eliminated.
The masked dancer was eliminated from the competition and unmasked upon their elimination.
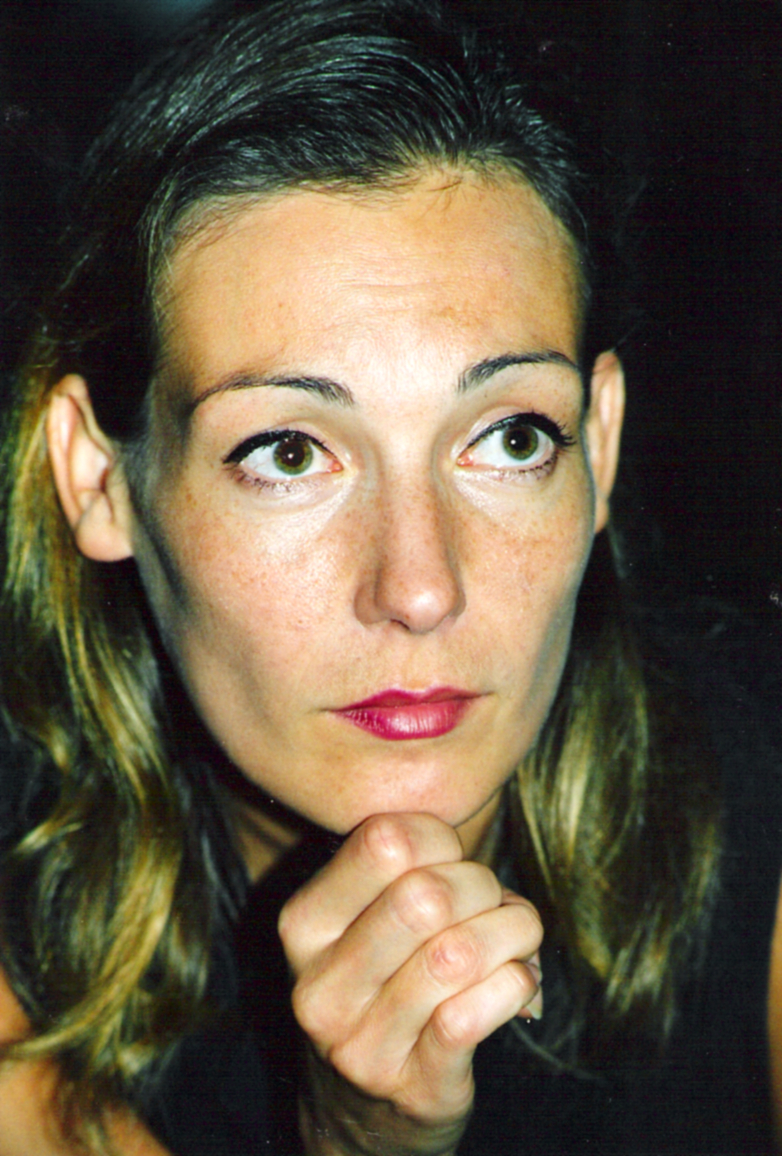
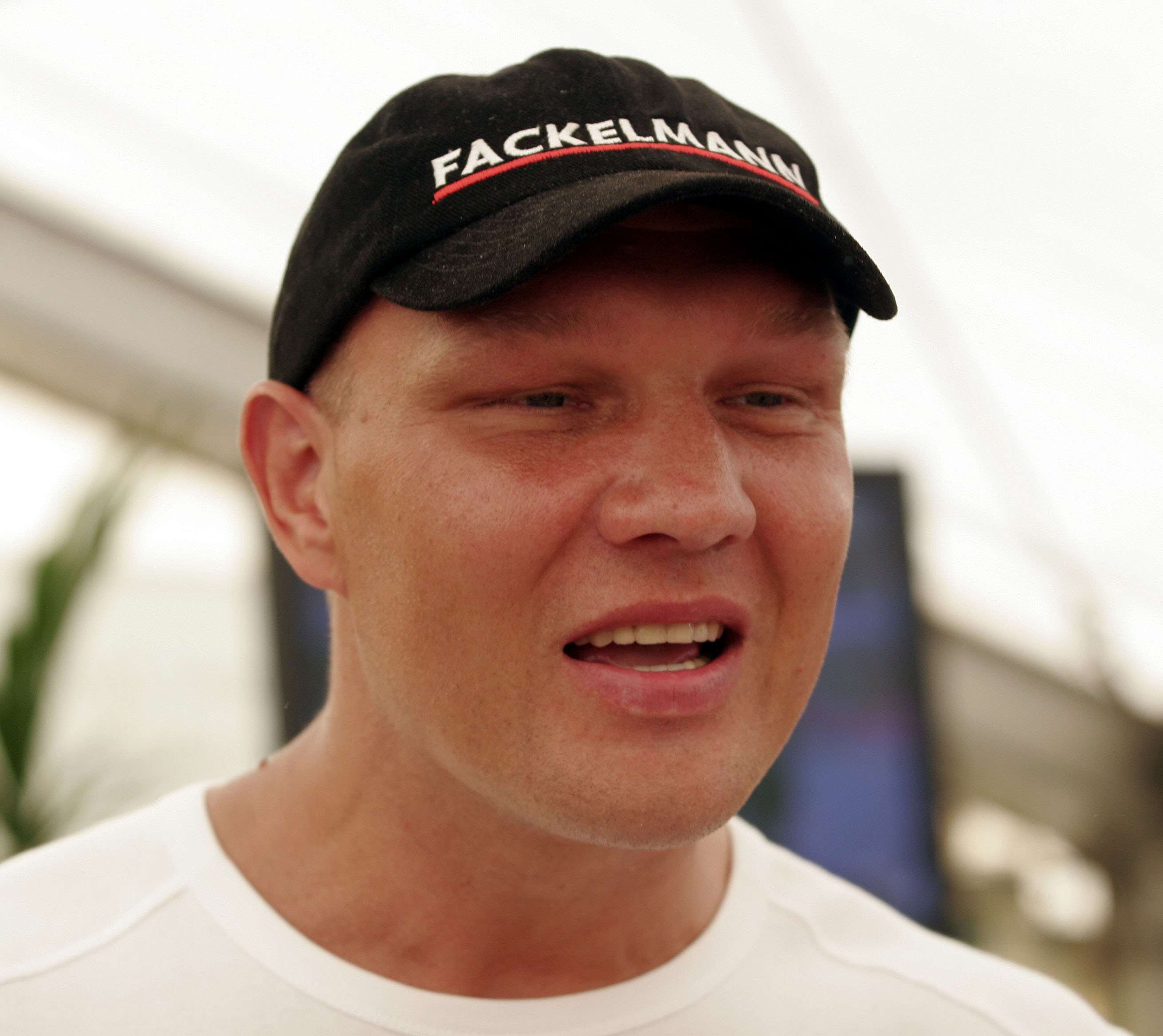
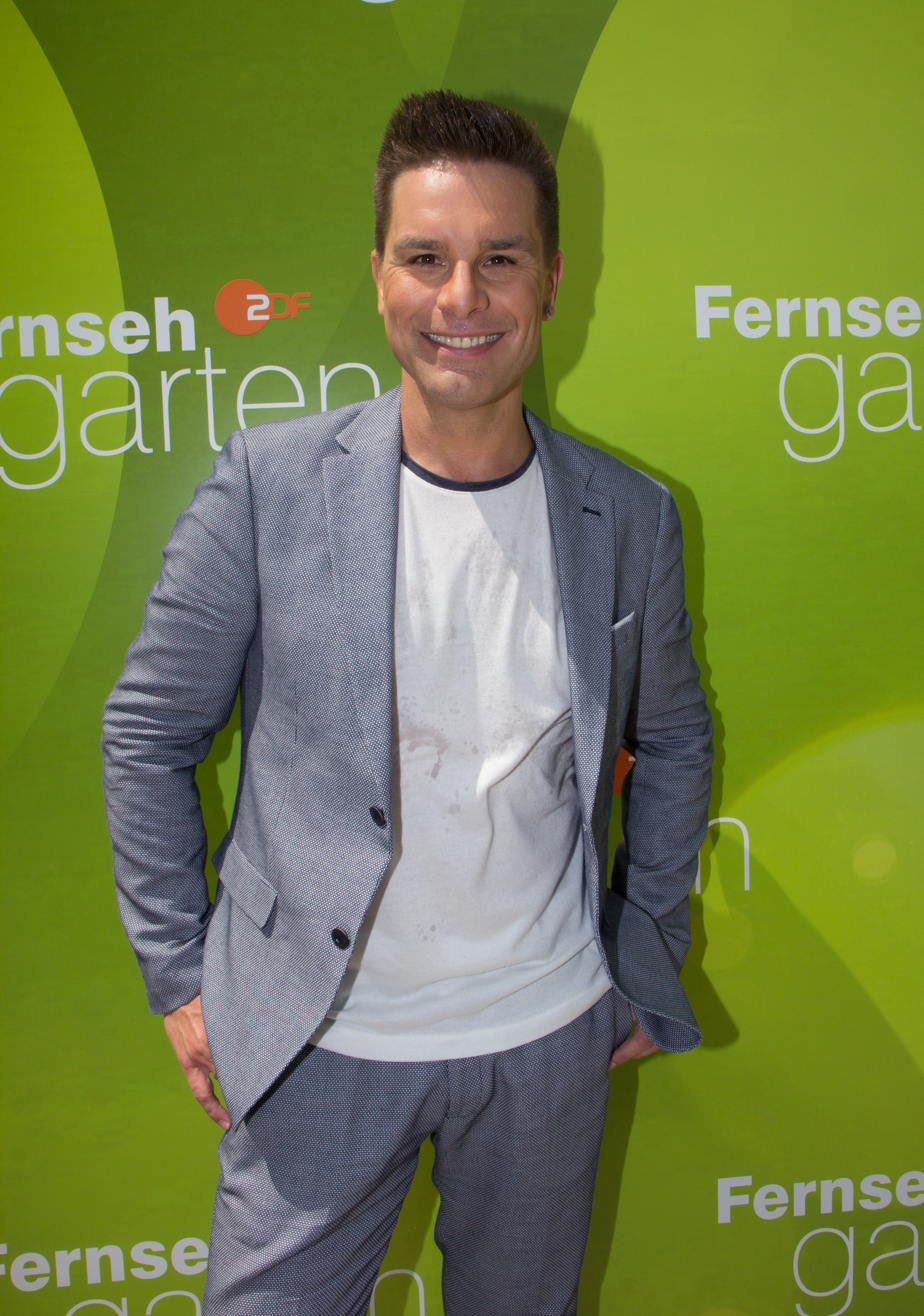
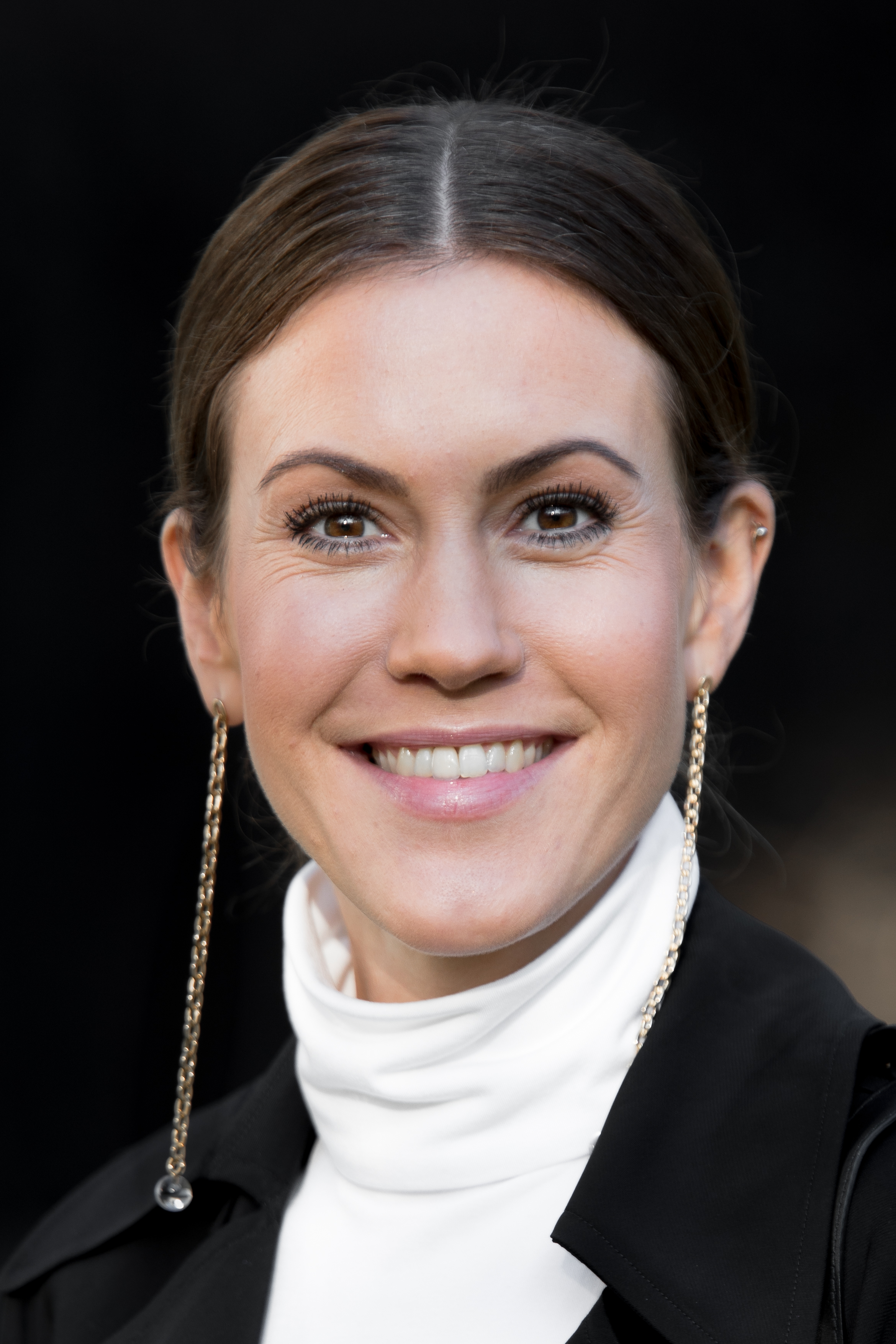
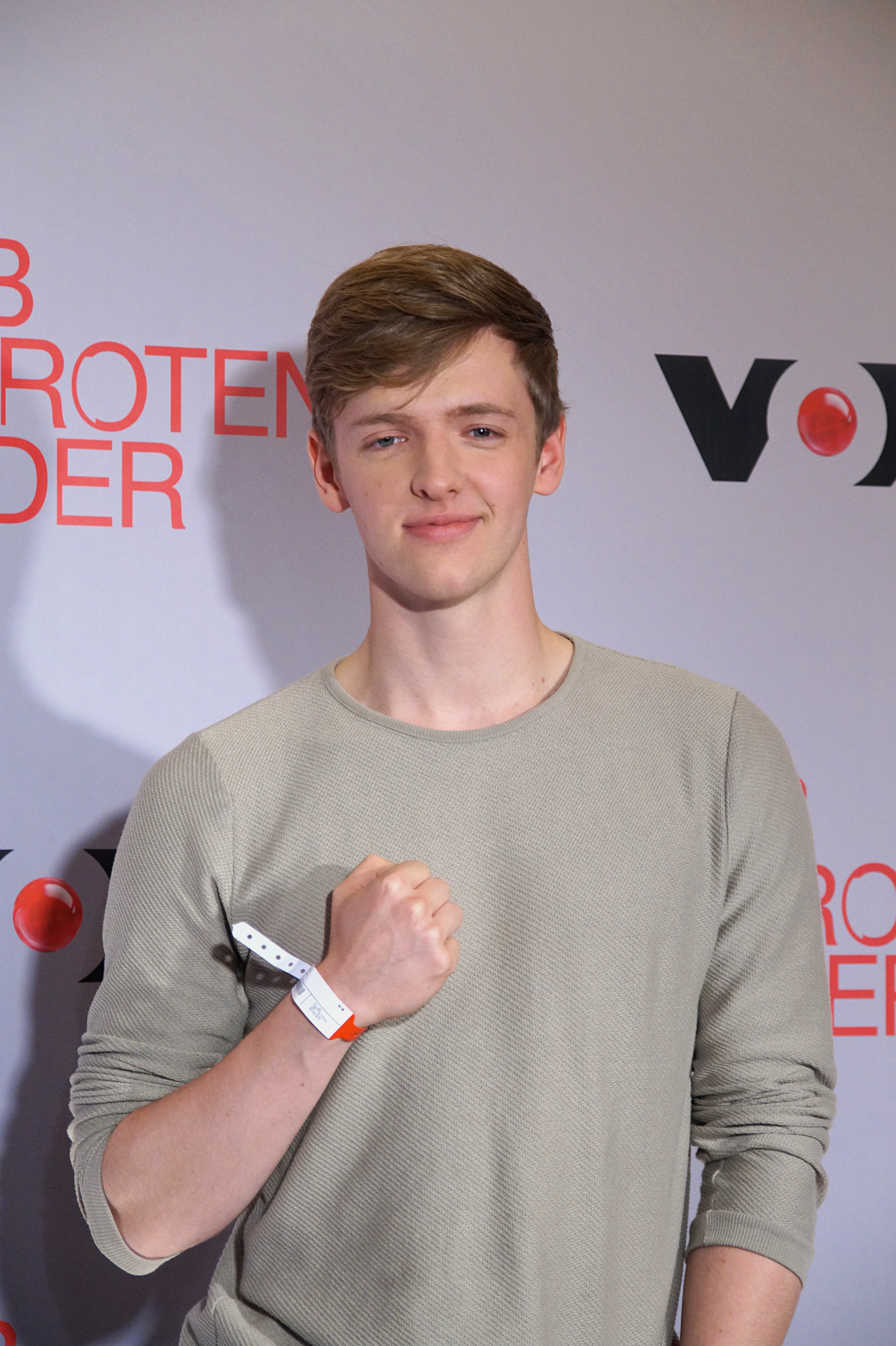
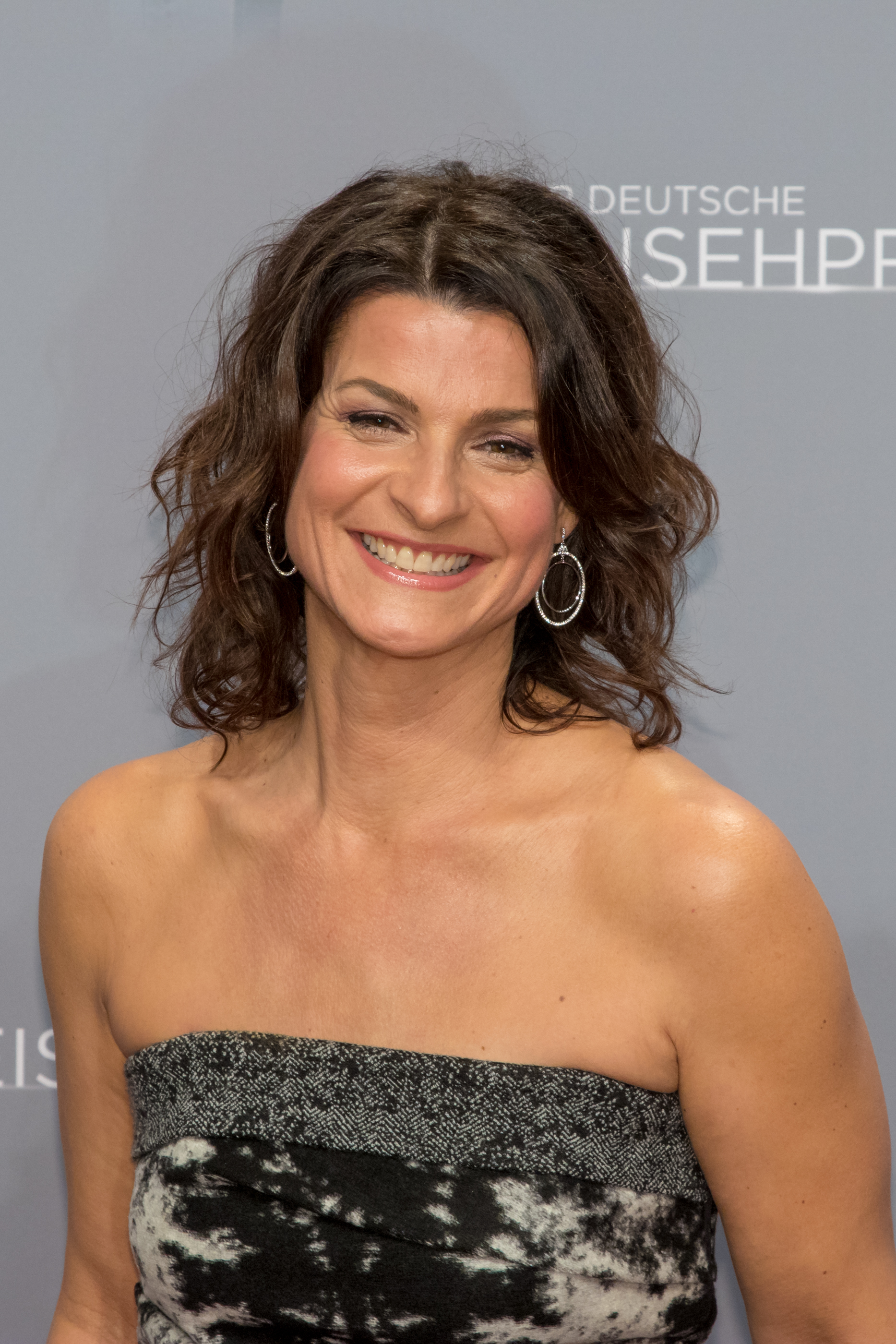
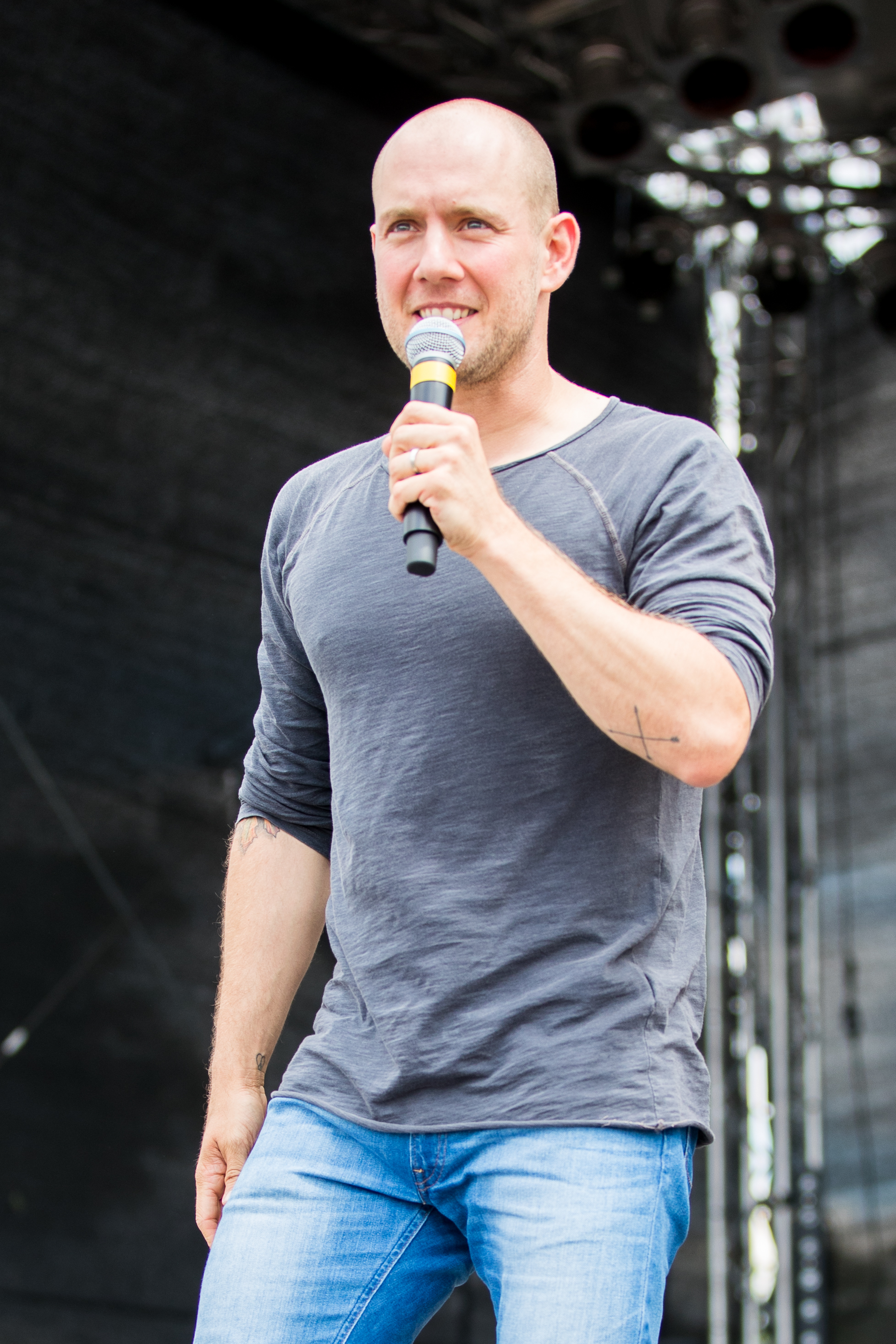
The celebrities who have competed in the first season of The Masked Dancer, pictured in order of elimination (l-r):
Ute Lemper ("Glühwürmchen"), Axel Schulz ("Schaf"), Eloy de Jong ("Maximum Power"), Wolke Hegenbarth ("Maus"), Timur Bartels ("Buntstift"), Marlene Lufen ("Zottel"), Oli.P ("Affe")

== Episodes ==
=== Week 1 (6 January) ===
Performances on the first live episode
#	Stage name	Song	Identity	Result
1	Glühwürmchen	"XO" by Beyoncé	Ute Lemper	OUT
2	Affe	"Stadtaffe"/"Schüttel deinen Speck" by Peter Fox	undisclosed	WIN
3	Maus	"Bang Bang" by Jessie J, Ariana Grande & Nicki Minaj	undisclosed	RISK
4	Zottel	"Shake It Off" by Taylor Swift/"Sailing" by Rod Stewart	undisclosed	WIN
5	Maximum Power	"The 2nd Law: Unsustainable" by Muse	undisclosed	RISK
6	Schaf	"Poison" by Bell Biv DeVoe/"Wonderful Life" by Matoma	undisclosed	RISK
7	Buntstift	"Sing, Sing, Sing" by Benny Goodman	undisclosed	WIN

=== Week 2 (13 January) ===
Performances on the second live episode
#	Stage name	Song	Identity	Result
1	Affe	"Rhythm Nation" by Janet Jackson	undisclosed	WIN
2	Zottel	"Ex's & Oh's" by Elle King/"Get Ur Freak On" by Missy Elliott	undisclosed	RISK
3	Buntstift	"I Love You Baby"/"Strangers in the Night" by Frank Sinatra/"I Believe I Can Fly" by R. Kelly	undisclosed	RISK
4	Maximum Power	Flash Medley	undisclosed	RISK
5	Schaf	"Ich liebe das Leben" by Vicky Leandros	Axel Schulz	OUT
6	Maus	"Can't Get You Out of My Head" by Kylie Minogue	undisclosed	WIN

=== Week 3 (20 January) – Semi-final ===
Performances on the third live episode
#	Stage name	Song	Result	
1	Zottel	"Bad Guy" by Billie Eilish	RISK	
2	Maus	"Love Again" by Dua Lipa/"Vielen Dank für die Blumen" by Udo Jürgens/"SexyBack" by Justin Timberlake	WIN	
3	Affe	"Pump It" by Black Eyed Peas	WIN	
4	Buntstift	"Uptown Funk" by Mark Ronson feat. Bruno Mars	WIN	
5	Maximum Power	"Black Hole Sun" by Soundgarden	RISK	
Dance-off details			Identity	Result
1	Zottel	"Creep" by Radiohead	undisclosed	SAFE
2	Maximum Power	"Adiós Nonino" by Astor Piazzolla	Eloy de Jong	OUT

=== Week 4 (27 January) – Final ===
- Group number: "Gonna Make You Sweat (Everybody Dance Now)" by C+C Music Factory feat. Martha Wash and Freedom Williams

==== Round One ====
Performances on the final live episode – round one
#	Stage name	Song	Identity	Result
1	Affe	"Thriller" by Michael Jackson	undisclosed	WIN
2	Maus	"Jai Ho" by A. R. Rahman	Wolke Hegenbarth	OUT
3	Buntstift	"Can't Hold Us" by Macklemore & Ryan Lewis/"Stronger" by Kanye West/"We Didn't Start the Fire" by Billy Joel	Timur Bartels	OUT
4	Zottel	"I Want You Back" by The Jackson 5/"I See Love" by Jonas Blue feat. Joe Jonas	undisclosed	WIN

==== Round Two ====
Performances on the final live episode – round two
#	Stage name	Song	Identity	Result
1	Affe	"Despacito" by Luis Fonsi feat. Daddy Yankee	Oli.P	WINNER
2	Zottel	"Don't Worry, Be Happy" by Bobby McFerrin/"Tequila" by The Champs	Marlene Lufen	RUNNER-UP

== Reception ==
=== Ratings ===
Episode	Original airdate	Timeslot	Viewers (in millions)		Share (in %)		Source
Episode	Original airdate	Timeslot	Household	Adults 14–49	Household	Adults 14–49	Source
1	6 January 2022	Thursday 8:15 pm	1.75	0.84	6.1	12.3	
2	13 January 2022	Thursday 8:15 pm	1.43	0.70	5.1	10.7	
3	20 January 2022	Thursday 8:15 pm	1.23	0.50	4.4	8.0	
4	27 January 2022	Thursday 8:15 pm	1.43	0.58	5.3	8.6	
Average			1.46	0.66	5.2	9.9	

== Spin-offs and related shows ==
=== The Masked Dancer – red. Special ===
Like in the original show, a companion show with the name The Masked Dancer – red. Special was shown on ProSieben immediately after the main show. The show features interviews with the panelists and the unmasked celebrity from that episode. Viviane Geppert (episodes 1–3) and Annemarie Carpendale (episode 4) were the presenters of the show.
