= Beschlossen und verkündet =

- Directed by: Thomas Engel
- Starring: Hans Söhnker
- Country of origin: Germany
- No. of seasons: 1
- No. of episodes: 13

Production
- Running time: 25 minutes

Original release
- Network: ZDF

Beschlossen und verkündet (Resolved and Proclaimed) is a German legal television series starring Hans Söhnker, Dieter Kursawe and Horst Keitel. 13 episodes were aired in 1975. It was the continuation of the series Lokaltermin (1973), which had a similar setting.

== Plot ==
The series is about a Berlin district court around 1900 where court hearings are held. Whether it is about theft, spiritualism or the "red socialists" - there is always enough to do for district judge Schröter and clerk Wutzke.

== Cast ==
- Hans Söhnker: District Judge Schröter
- Dieter Kursawe: Clerk Wutzke
- Horst Keitel: Public Prosecutor Böck
- Monika Peitsch
- Harald Juhnke
- Harald Leipnitz
- Walter Richter
- Marianne Pohlenz
- Jürgen Janza
- Peer Schmidt
- Ingrid Steeger
- Claus Wilcke
- Gustl Bayrhammer
- Michaela May
- Edith Hancke
- Thomas Fritsch
- Theo Lingen
- Stefan Behrens
- Hans Jürgen Diedrich
- Robert Dietl
- Günter Glaser
- Hans Hessling
- Oscar Sabo
- Peter Schiff
- Friedrich Schoenfelder
- Richard Süssenguth
- Guido Weber

== See also ==
- Lokaltermin (1973)
- List of German television series
