= 1965 in Germany =

- Decades: 1940s; 1950s; 1960s; 1970s; 1980s
- See also: Other events of 1965; History of Germany • Timeline • Years

Events in the year 1965 in Germany.

== Incumbents ==
- President – Heinrich Lübke
- Chancellor – Ludwig Erhard

== Events ==
- 4 January - German broadcaster NDR Fernsehen started.
- 27 February - Germany in the Eurovision Song Contest 1965
- March - Louis Armstrong performed a series of concerts across Germany
- 25 June - 6 July - 15th Berlin International Film Festival
- 19 September - West German federal election, 1965
- 26 October - The Second Erhard cabinet led by Ludwig Erhard was sworn in.

== Births ==
- January 6 - Christine Wachtel, German runner
- January 12 - Maybrit Illner, German journalist
- January 24 - Robin Dutt, German footballer
- February 9
  - Christian Schenk, German athlete
  - Dieter Baumann, German athlete
  - Silvia Sperber, German sport shooter
- February 24 - Hansi Flick, German football player and manager
- February 27 - Frank Peter Zimmermann, German violinist
- April 6
  - Theresia Bauer, German politician
  - Rica Reinisch, German swimmer
- April 11 - Simone Thomalla, German actress
- April 21
  - Thomas Helmer, German football player
  - Christina Plate, German actress
- May 11 - Guido Maria Kretschmer, German fashion designer
- May 15 - Martin Sonneborn, German comedian and politician
- May 23 - Tom Tykwer, German film director
- June 10 - Veronica Ferres, German actress
- June 19 - Sabine Braun, German athlete
- June 23 - Manuel Andrack, German journalist, television show editor, television host and author
- July 6 – Hannes Zehentner, German alpine skier
- July 9 - Nadine Capellmann, German equestrian
- August 2 - Katrin Müller-Hohenstein, German journalist
- August 16 - Ercan Durmaz, German actor
- August 28 - Peter Kohl, German businessman and author
- September 7 - Jörg Pilawa, German television presenter
- September 12
  - Silke Hörner, German swimmer
  - Oliver Kalkofe, German comedian and television presenter
- October 6 - Jürgen Kohler, German football player
- October 11 - Alexander Hacke, German guitarist and singer
- October 23 - Andreas Zülow, German boxer
- November 7 - Sigrun Wodars, German middle-distance athlete
- November 11 - Friedrich Merz, German lawyer and politician
- November 23 - Marcel Beyer, German writer
- December 3 - Katarina Witt, German figure skater
- December 4 - Ulf Kirsten, German football player
- December 21
  - Anke Engelke, German actress and comedian
  - Cem Özdemir, German politician

=== Full date unknown ===
- Henning Löhlein, German illustrator

== Deaths ==
- 17 January - Hans Marchwitza, German writer and poet (born 1890)
- 29 March - Heinrich Schomburgk, German tennis player (born 1885)
- 7 May - Princess Pauline of Württemberg (born 1877)
- 12 May - Max Herz, German businessman (born 1905)
- 1 June - Hellmut von der Chevallerie, German general (born 1896)
- 2 September - Johannes Bobrowski, German poet and writer (born 1917)
- 4 September — Albert Schweitzer, German theologian, organist, philosopher, and physician (born 1875)
- 8 September — Hermann Staudinger, German chemist (born 1881)
- 11 October - Hans Nielsen, German actor (born 1911)
- 22 October - Paul Tillich, Christian existentialist philosopher and Lutheran Protestant theologian (born 1886)
- 25 October - Hans Knappertsbusch, German conductor (born 1888)
- 2 November - Herbert Windt, German composer (born 1894)
- 3 November - Hans von Raumer, German politician (born 1870)
- 19 November — Werner Lange, Kriegsmarine admiral (born 1893)

== See also ==
- 1965 in German television
