= The Masked Singer (German TV series) season 4 =

The Masked Singer
- Season 4
- Starring: Ruth Moschner; Rea Garvey; Various guests
- Hosted by: Matthias Opdenhövel
- No. of contestants: 10
- Winner: Sasha as "Dinosaurier"
- Runner-up: Cassandra Steen as "Leopard"
- No. of episodes: 6

Release
- Original network: ProSieben
- Original release: 16 February – 23 March 2021

Season chronology
- ← Previous; Season 3 Next → Season 5

The fourth season of the German singing competition The Masked Singer premiered on 16 February 2021 on ProSieben. Ruth Moschner and Rea Garvey returned to the panel after one season hiatus, replacing Bülent Ceylan and Sonja Zietlow. Matthias Opdenhövel also returned as host.

On 23 March 2021, the Dinosaurier (singer Sasha) was declared the winner and the Leopard (singer Cassandra Steen) was the runner-up.

== Panelists and host ==
Season 4 panelists and host

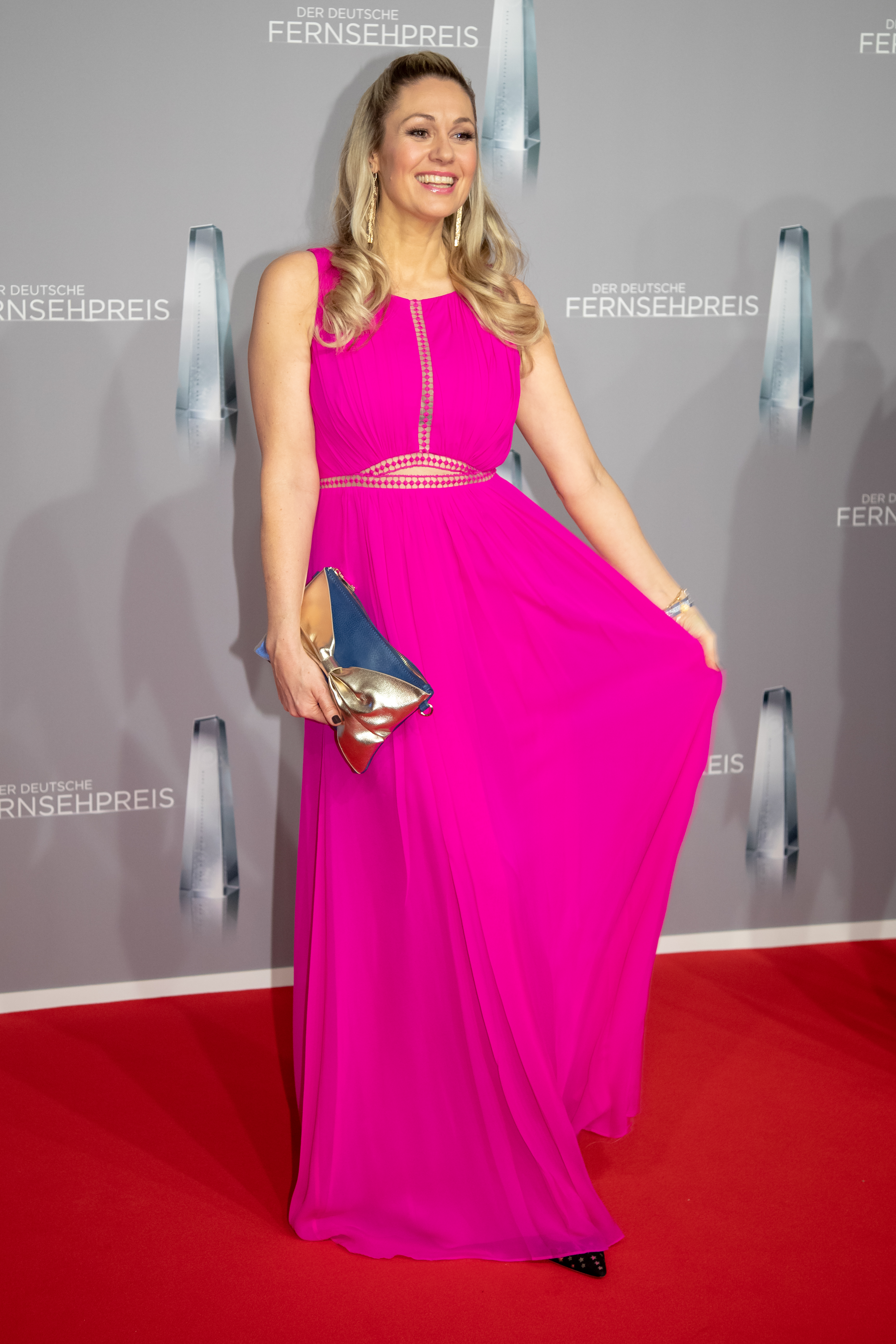
Ruth Moschner

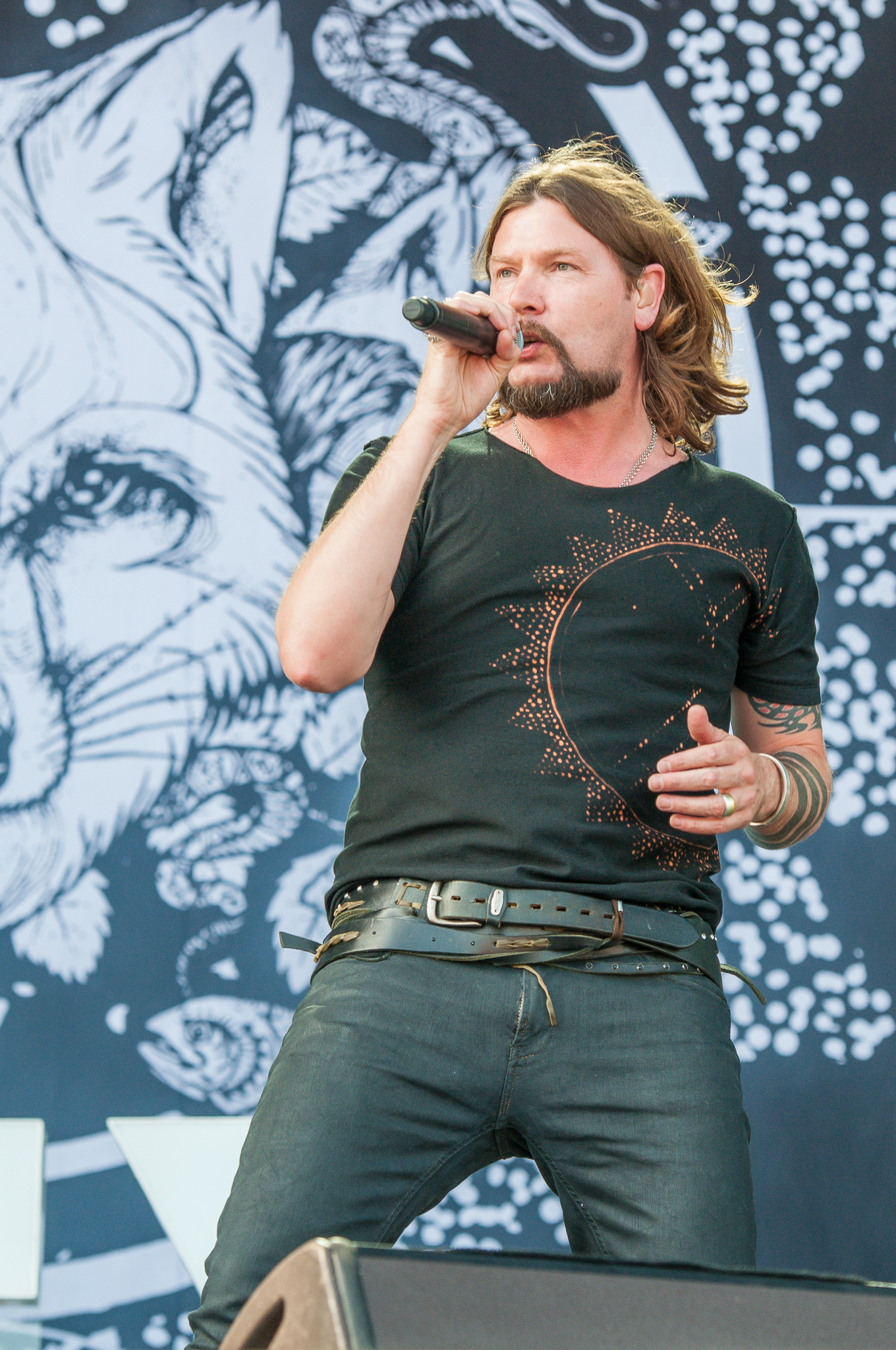
Rea Garvey

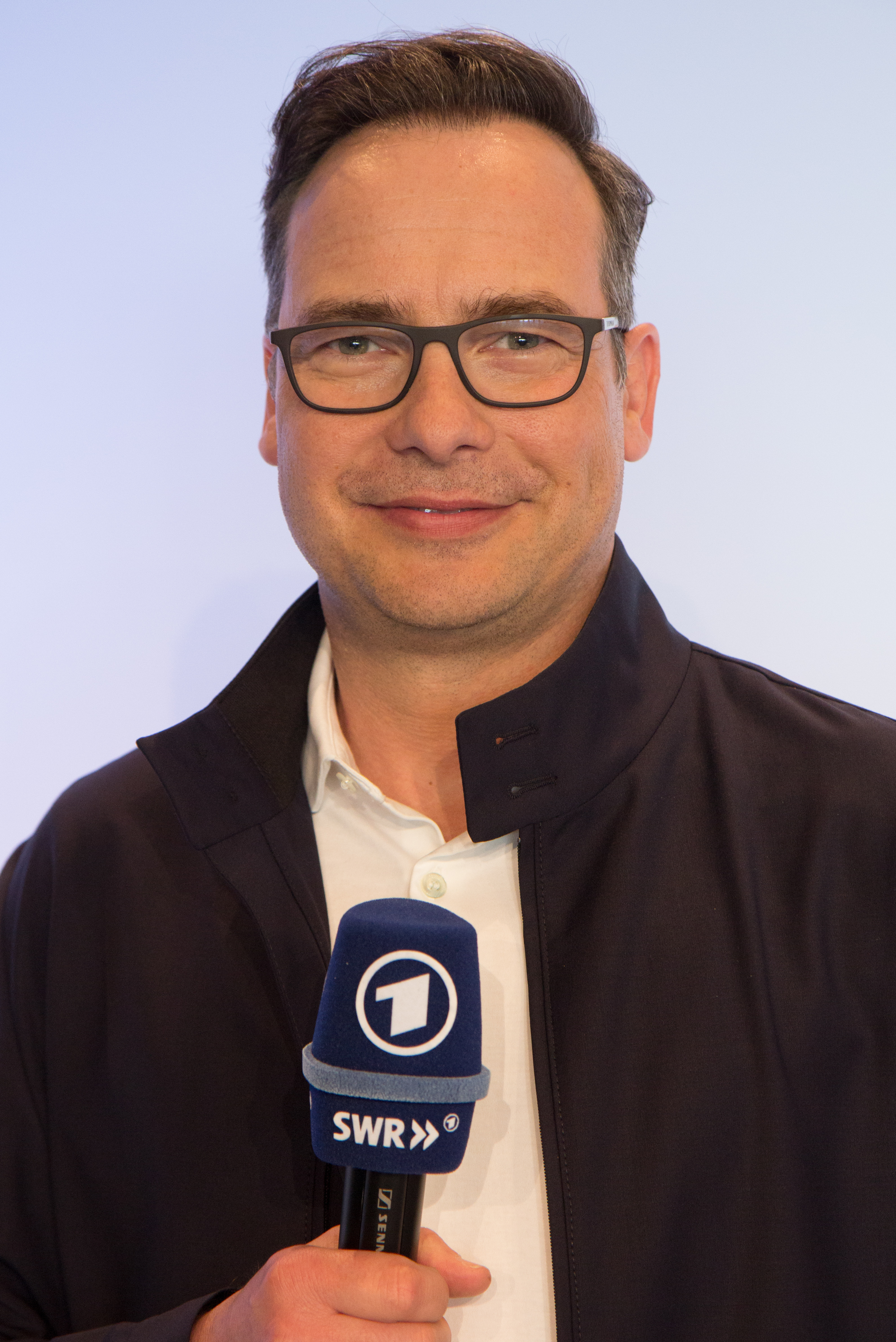
Matthias Opdenhövel

Matthias Opdenhövel returned as host. In August 2020, it was announced that Ruth Moschner and Rea Garvey, would be returning after one season hiatus.

As in previous seasons, a spin-off show named The Masked Singer - red. Special was aired after each live episode, hosted by Viviane Geppert (episodes 1, 3–4, 6) and Annemarie Carpendale (episodes 2, 5).

=== Guest panelists ===
Various guest panelists appeared as the third judge in the judging panel for one episode. These guest panelists included:

Season 4 guest panelists

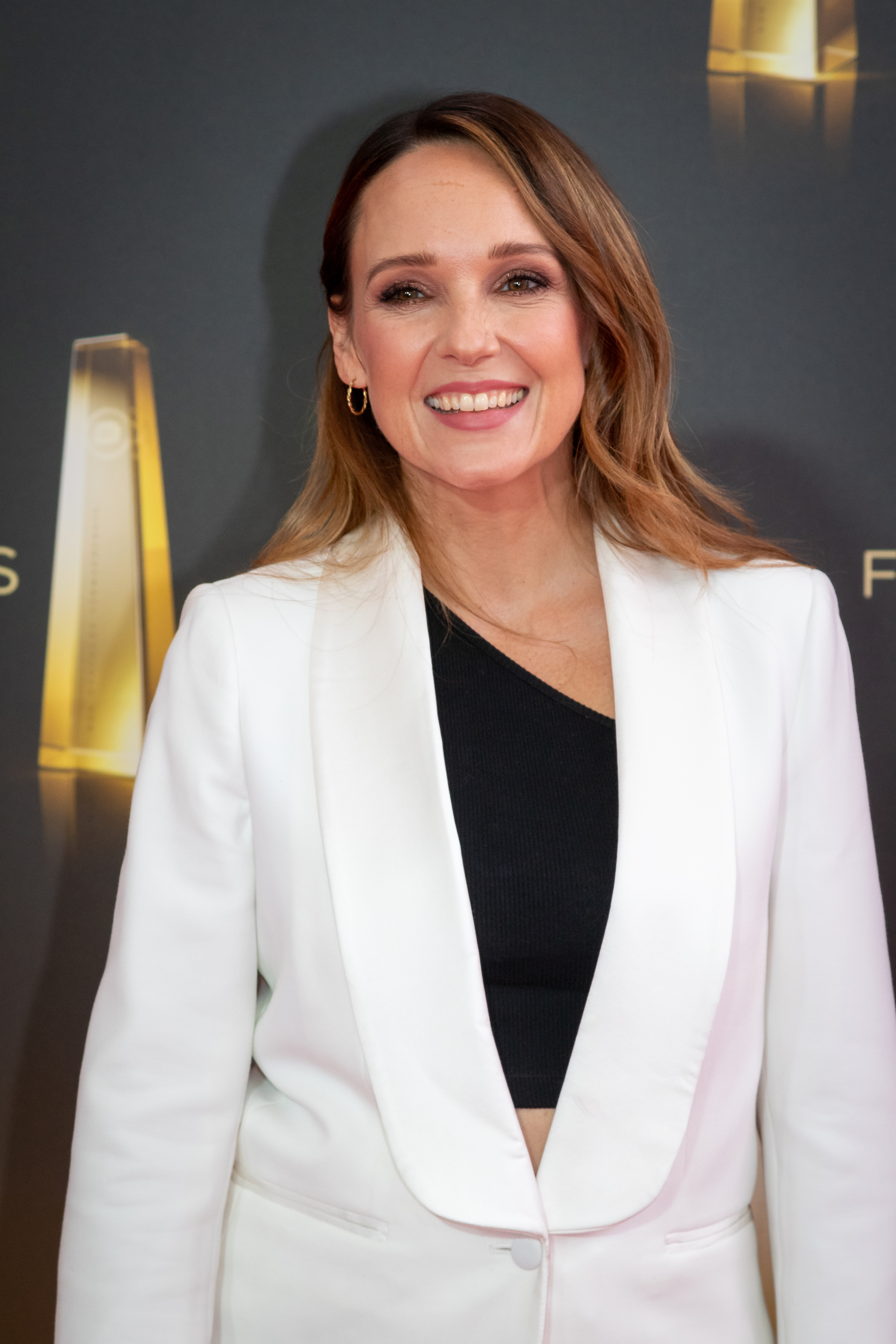
Carolin Kebekus (episode 1)

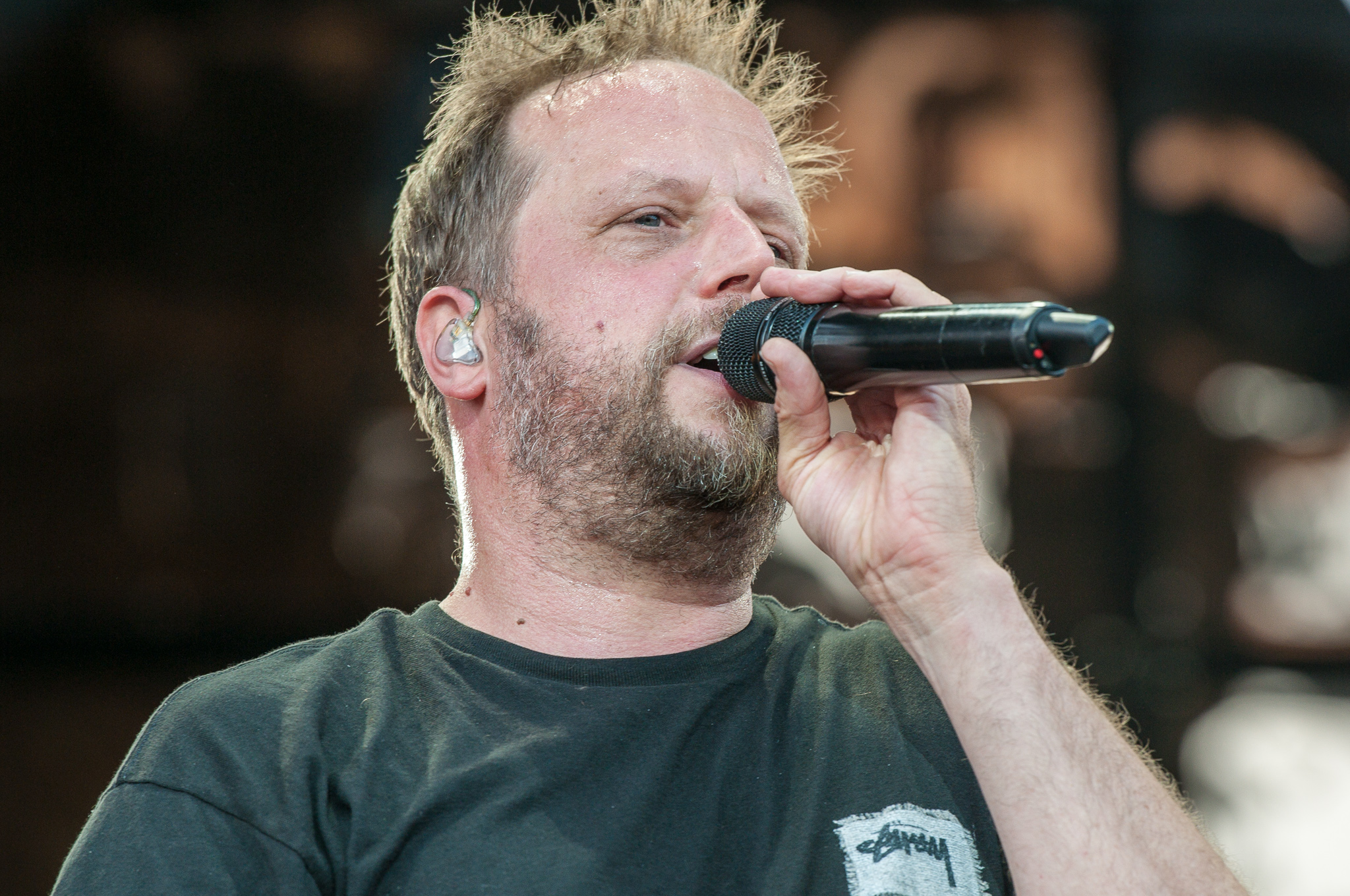
Smudo (episode 2)

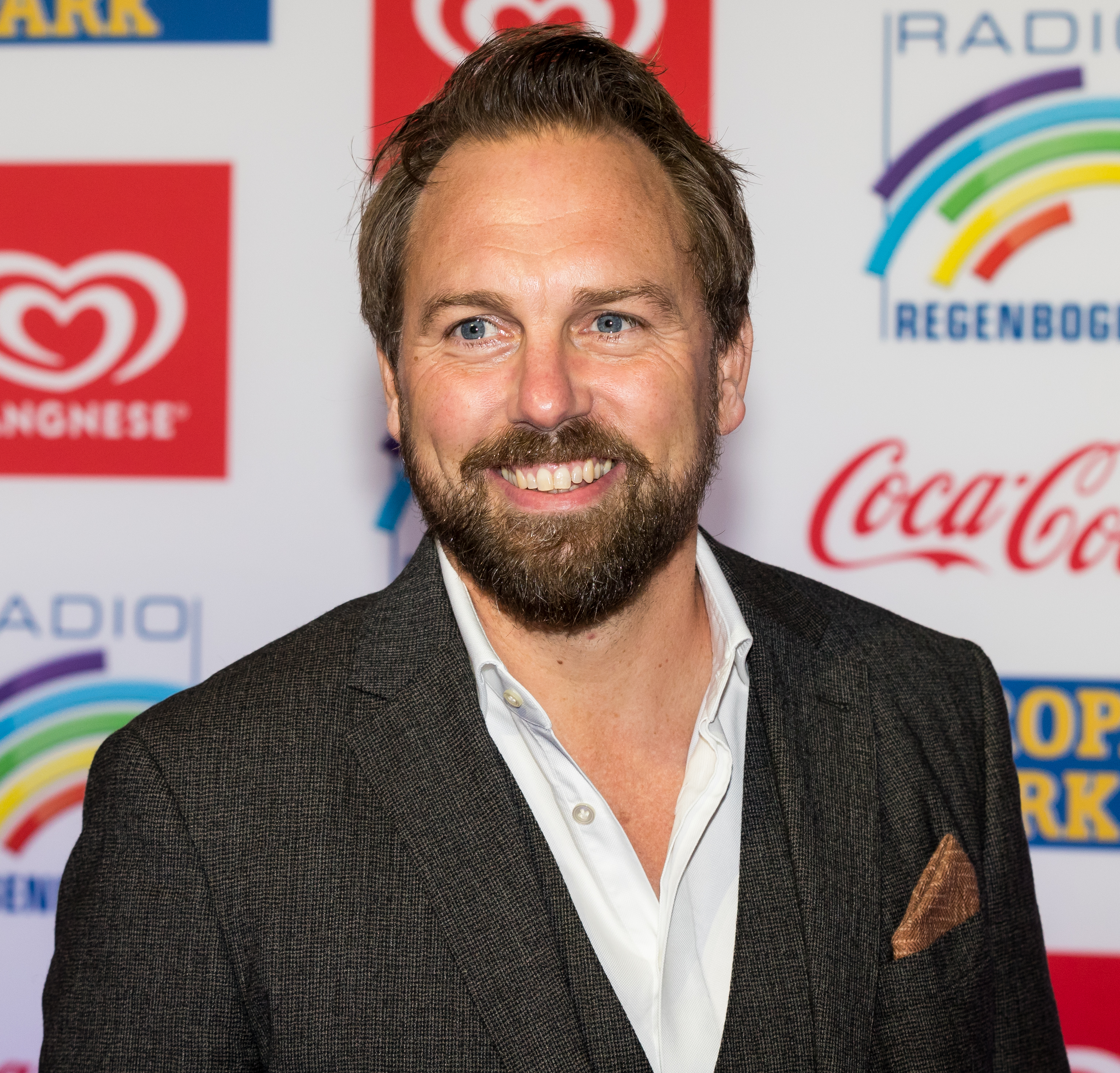
Steven Gätjen (episode 3)

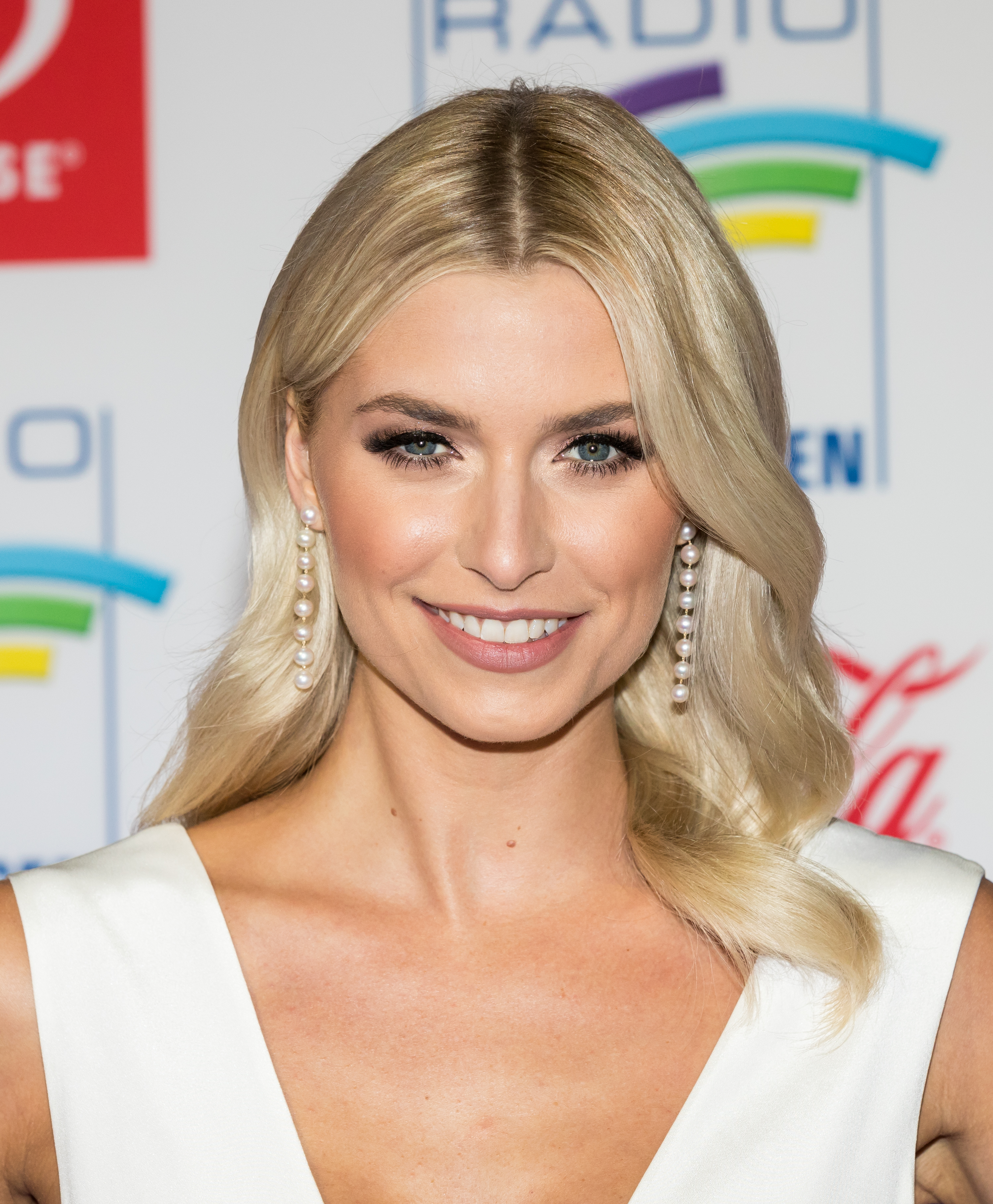
Lena Gercke (episode 4)

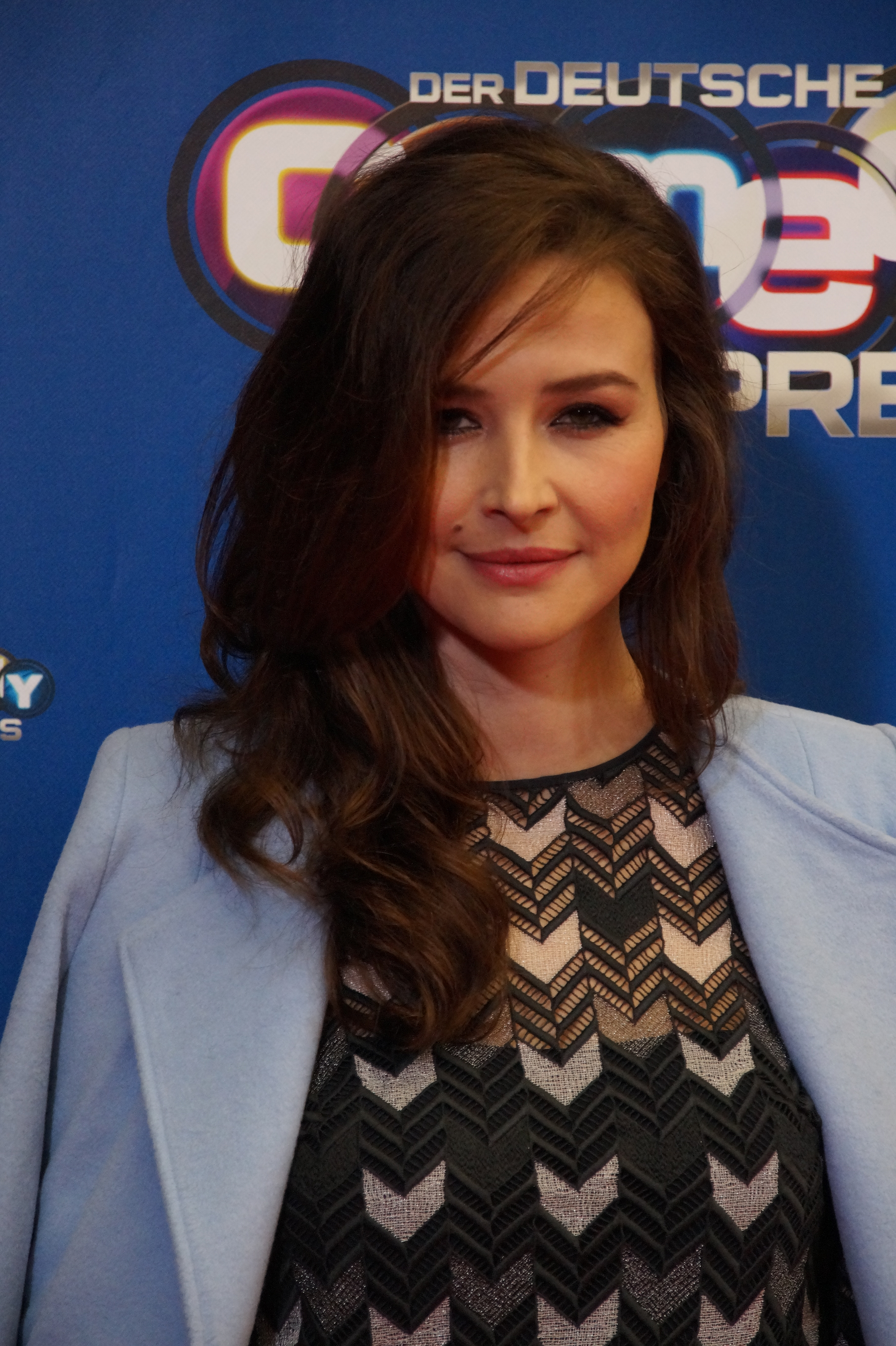
Katrin Bauerfeind (episode 5)

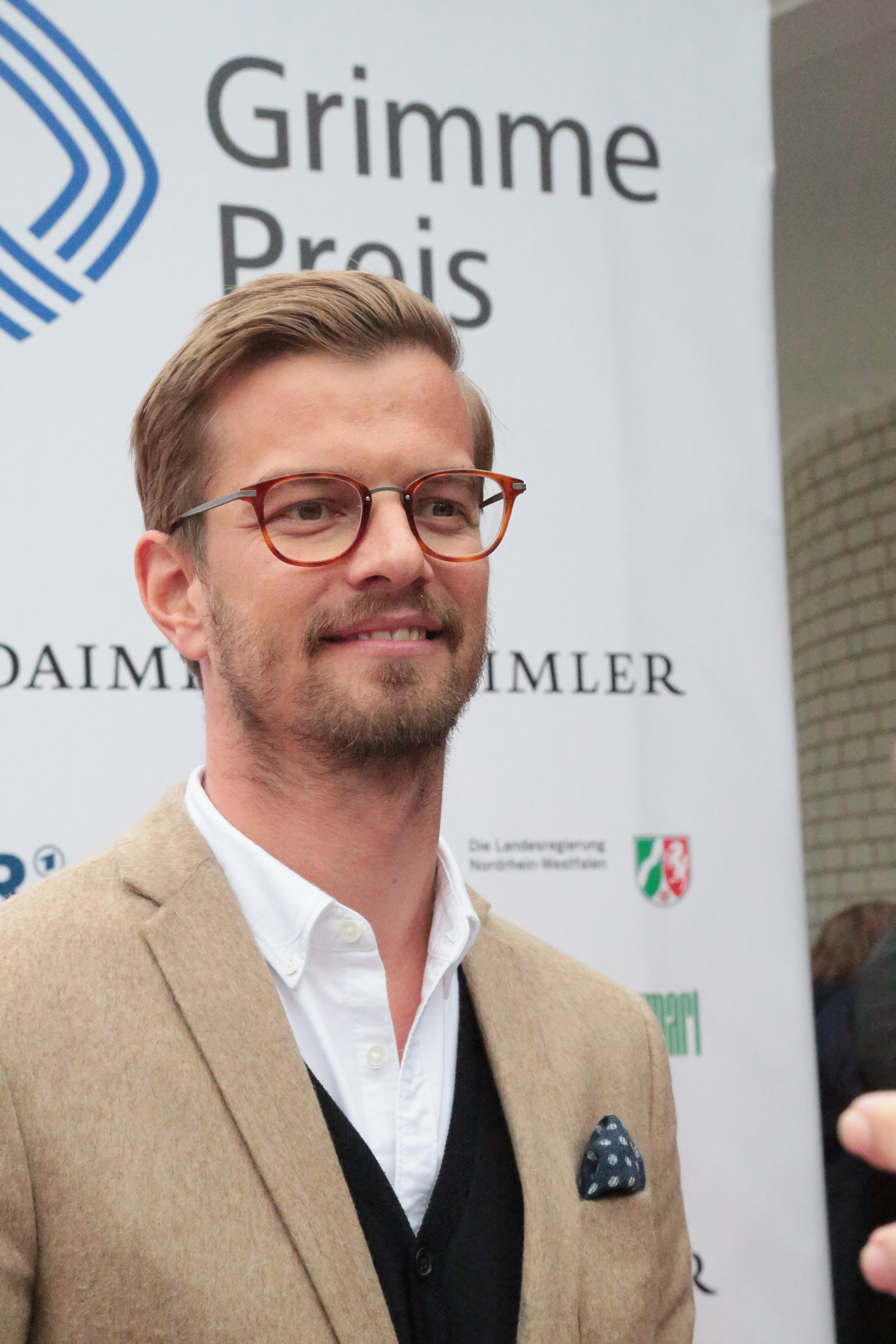
Joko Winterscheidt (episode 6)

Episode	Name	Notability	Ref.
1	Carolin Kebekus	Comedienne	
2	Smudo	Rapper	
3	Steven Gätjen	TV Host	
4	Lena Gercke	Model & TV Host	
5	Katrin Bauerfeind	Actress	
6	Joko Winterscheidt	TV Host	

== Contestants ==
Like in the previous seasons, the fourth season included 10 contestants. On 26 January 2021, the first three contestants were revealed. Since 5 February 2021 until 11 February 2021, every day one new costume was revealed.

Results
Stage name	Celebrity	Notability	Live Episodes							
Stage name	Celebrity	Notability	1	2	3	4	5	6		
Stage name	Celebrity	Notability	1	2	3	4	5	A	B	C
Dinosaurier "Dinosaur"	Sasha	Singer	WIN	WIN	WIN	WIN	WIN	SAFE	SAFE	WINNER
Leopard	Cassandra Steen	Singer	WIN	WIN	WIN	WIN	RISK	SAFE	SAFE	RUNNER-UP
Flamingo	Ross Antony	Singer	RISK	WIN	RISK	WIN	WIN	SAFE	THIRD	
Schildkröte "Turtle"	Thomas Anders	Singer	WIN	WIN	WIN	WIN	RISK	OUT		
Monstronaut	Thore Schölermann	TV Presenter	RISK	WIN	WIN	RISK	OUT			
Stier "Bull"	Guildo Horn	Singer	WIN	WIN	RISK	RISK	OUT			
Küken "Chick"	Judith Rakers	Journalist	WIN	RISK	RISK	OUT				
Quokka	Henning Baum	Actor	WIN	RISK	OUT					
Einhorn "Unicorn"	Franziska van Almsick	Former Swimmer	RISK	OUT						
Schwein "Pig"	Katrin Müller-Hohenstein	TV Presenter	OUT							

The masked singer won their face-off and remained in the competition.
The masked singer lost their face-off and was in the bottom four/three/two, but was not eliminated.
The masked singer was safe from elimination.
The masked singer was eliminated from the competition and unmasked upon their elimination.
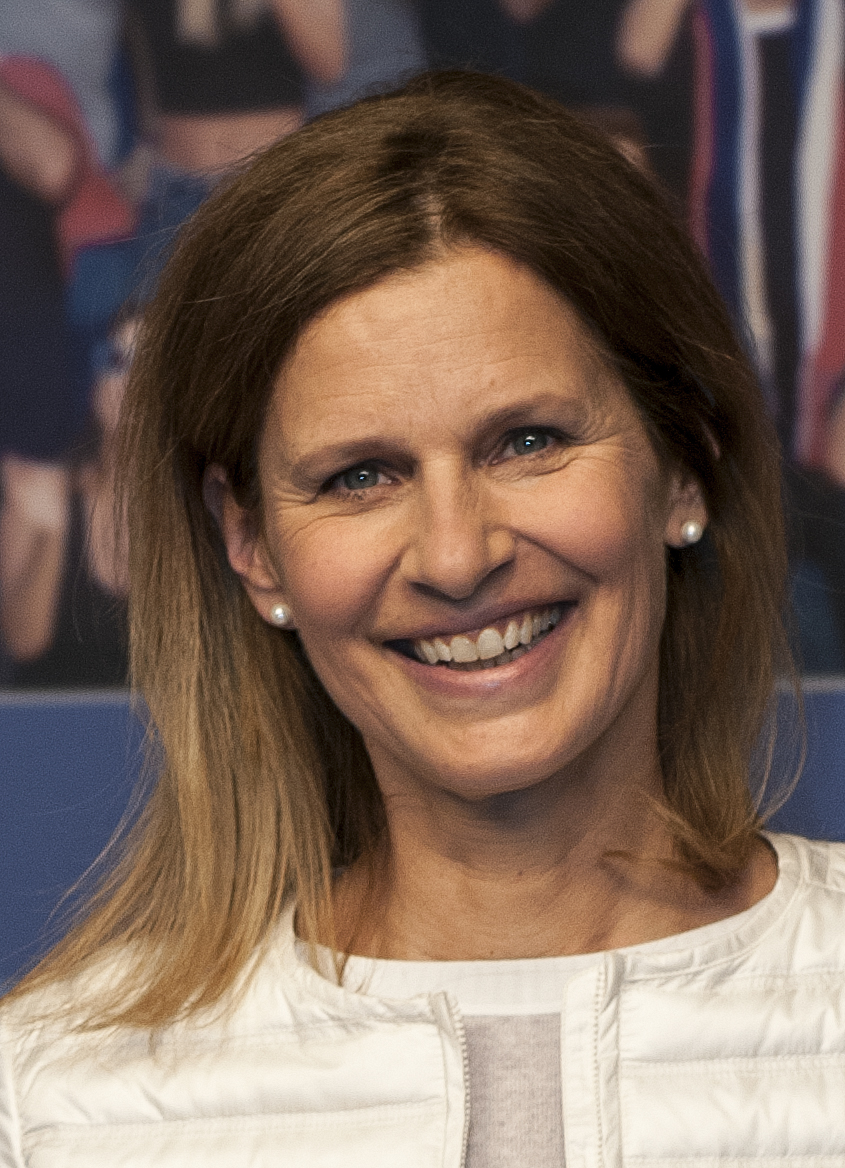
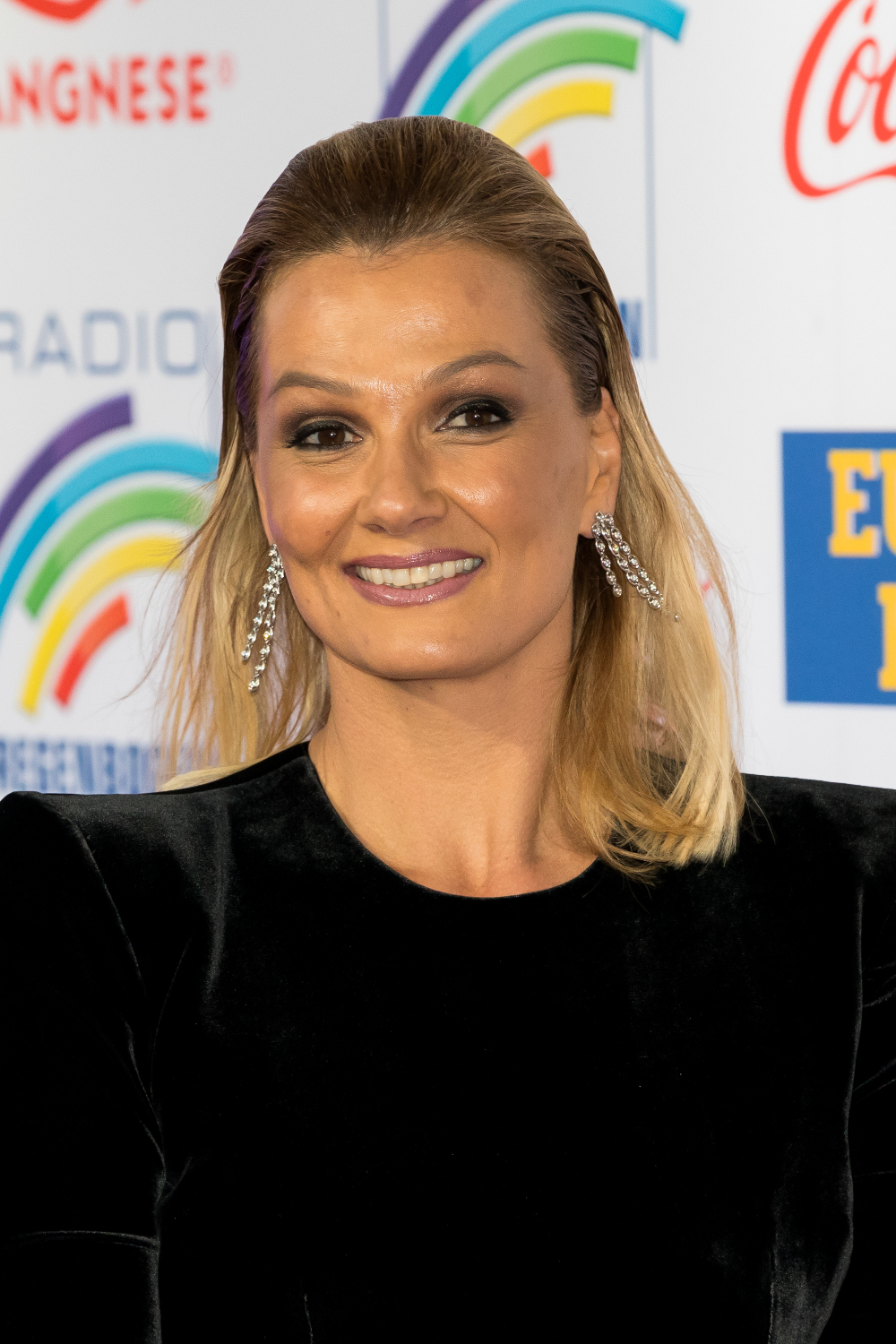
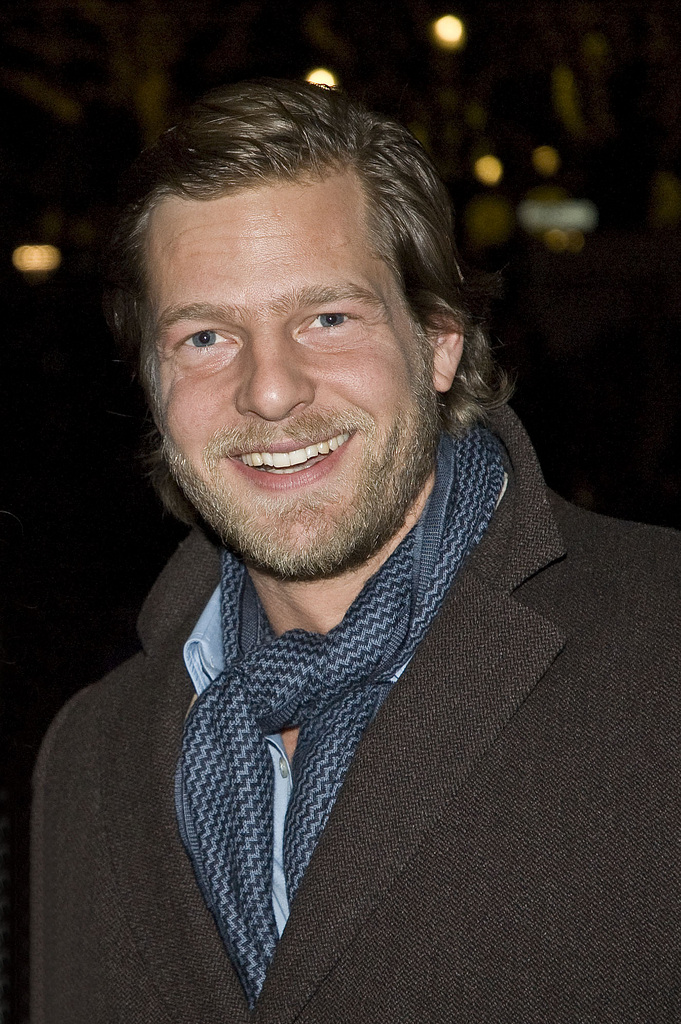
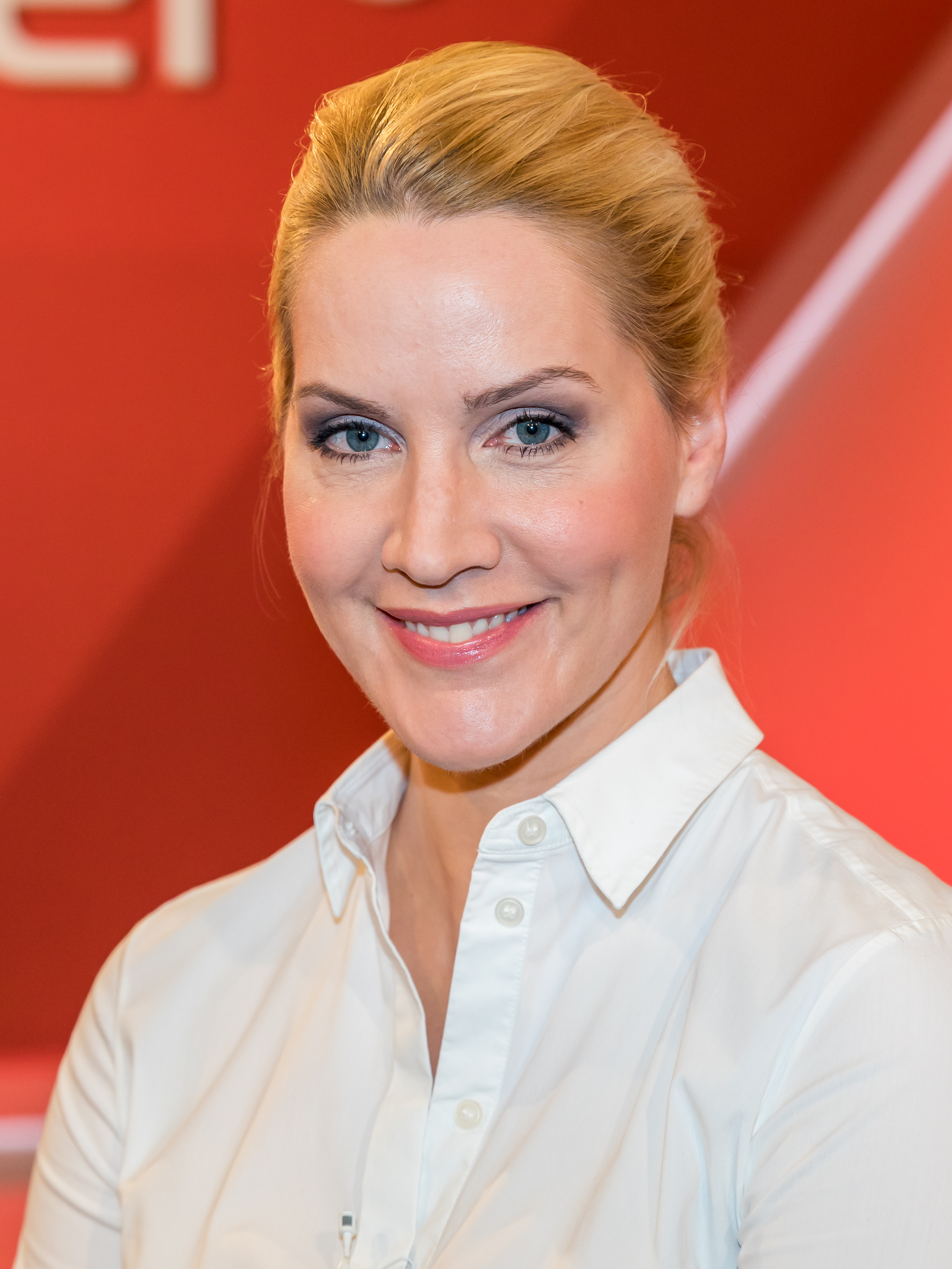
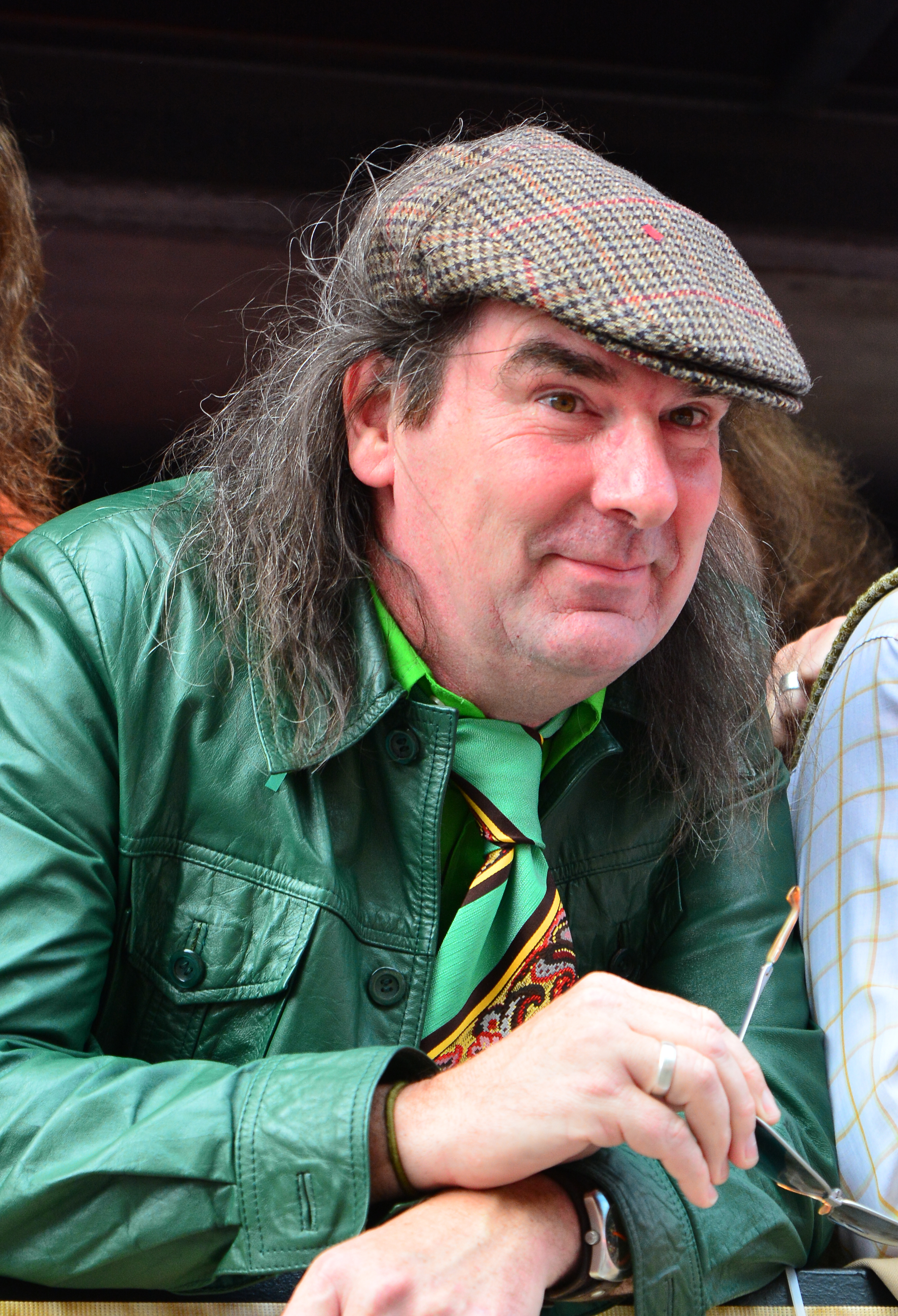
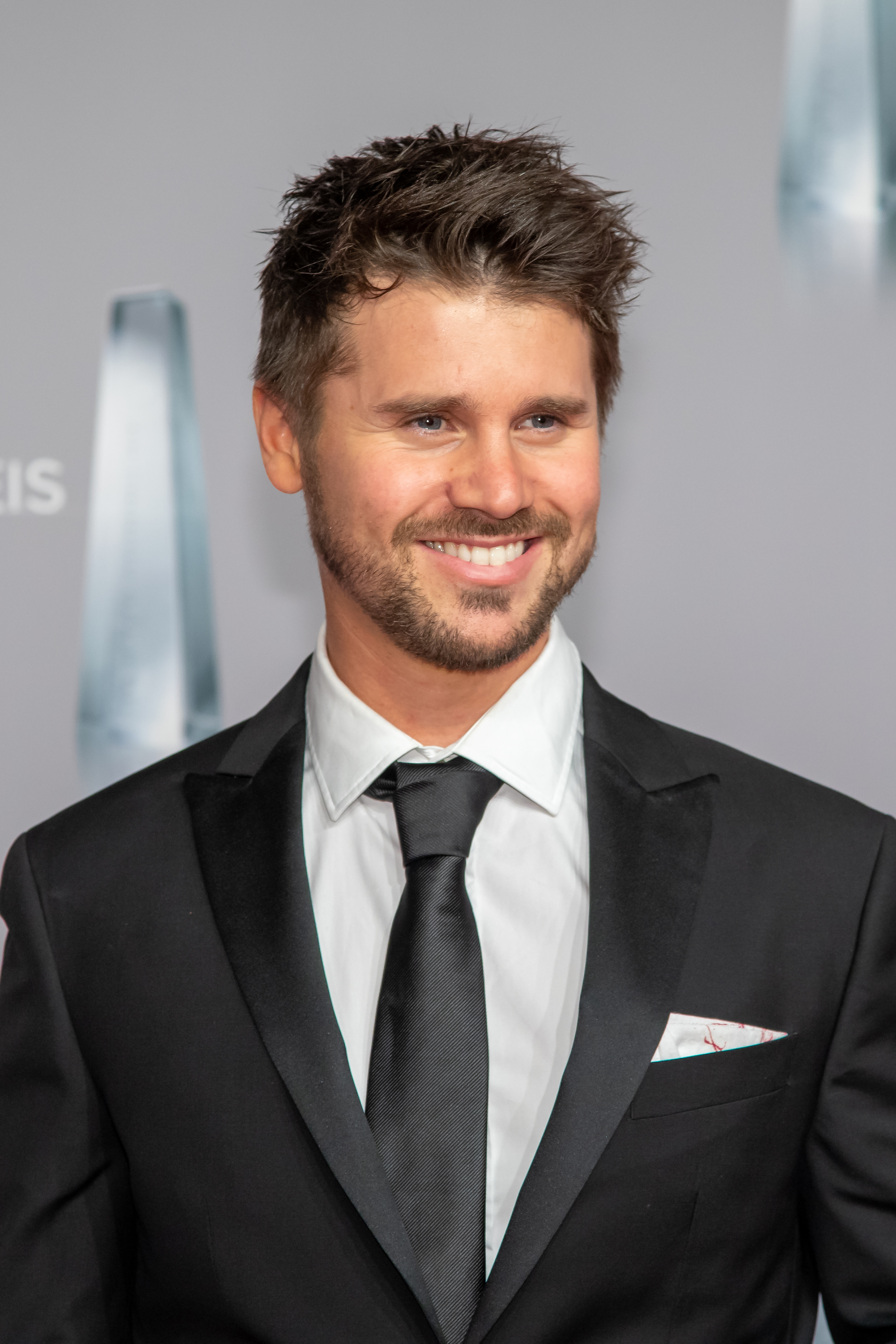
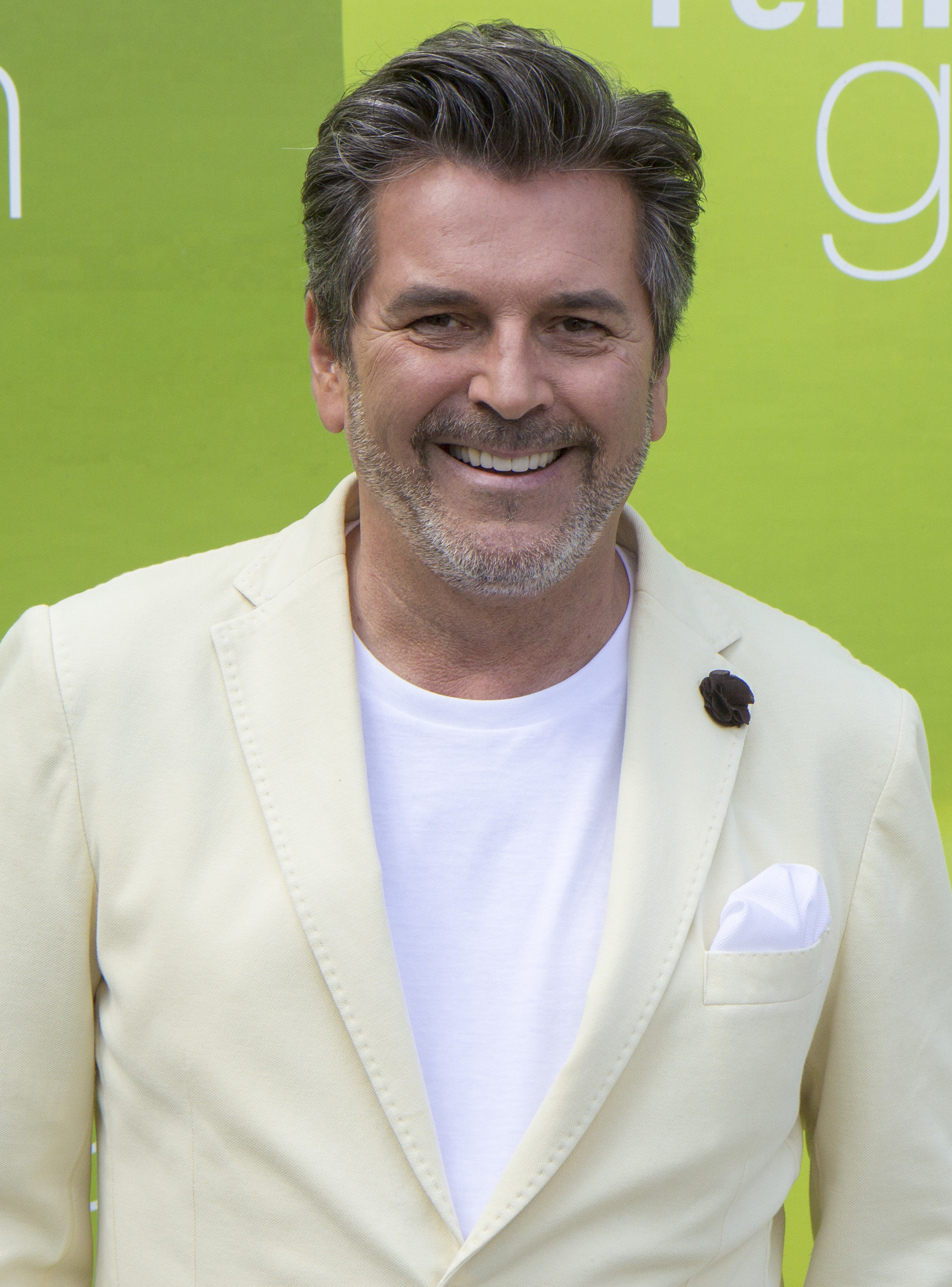
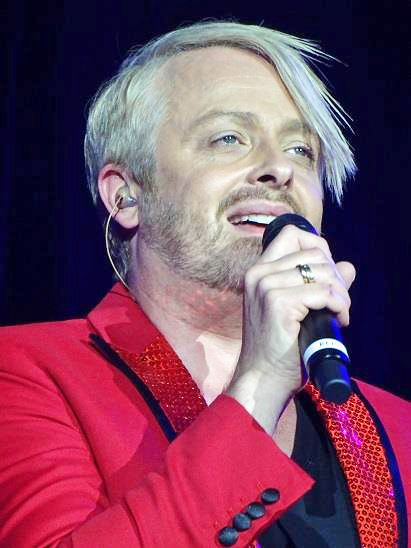
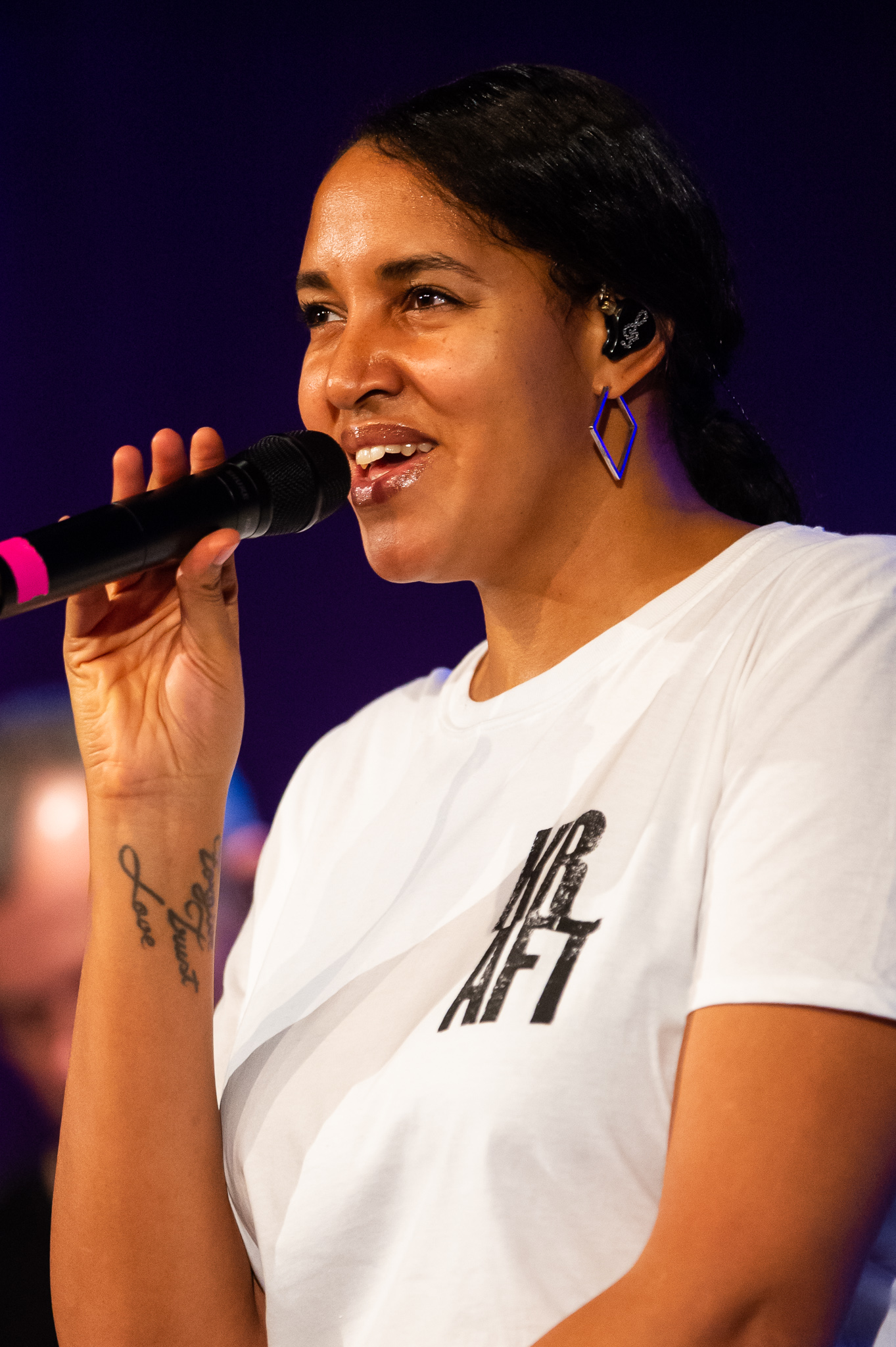
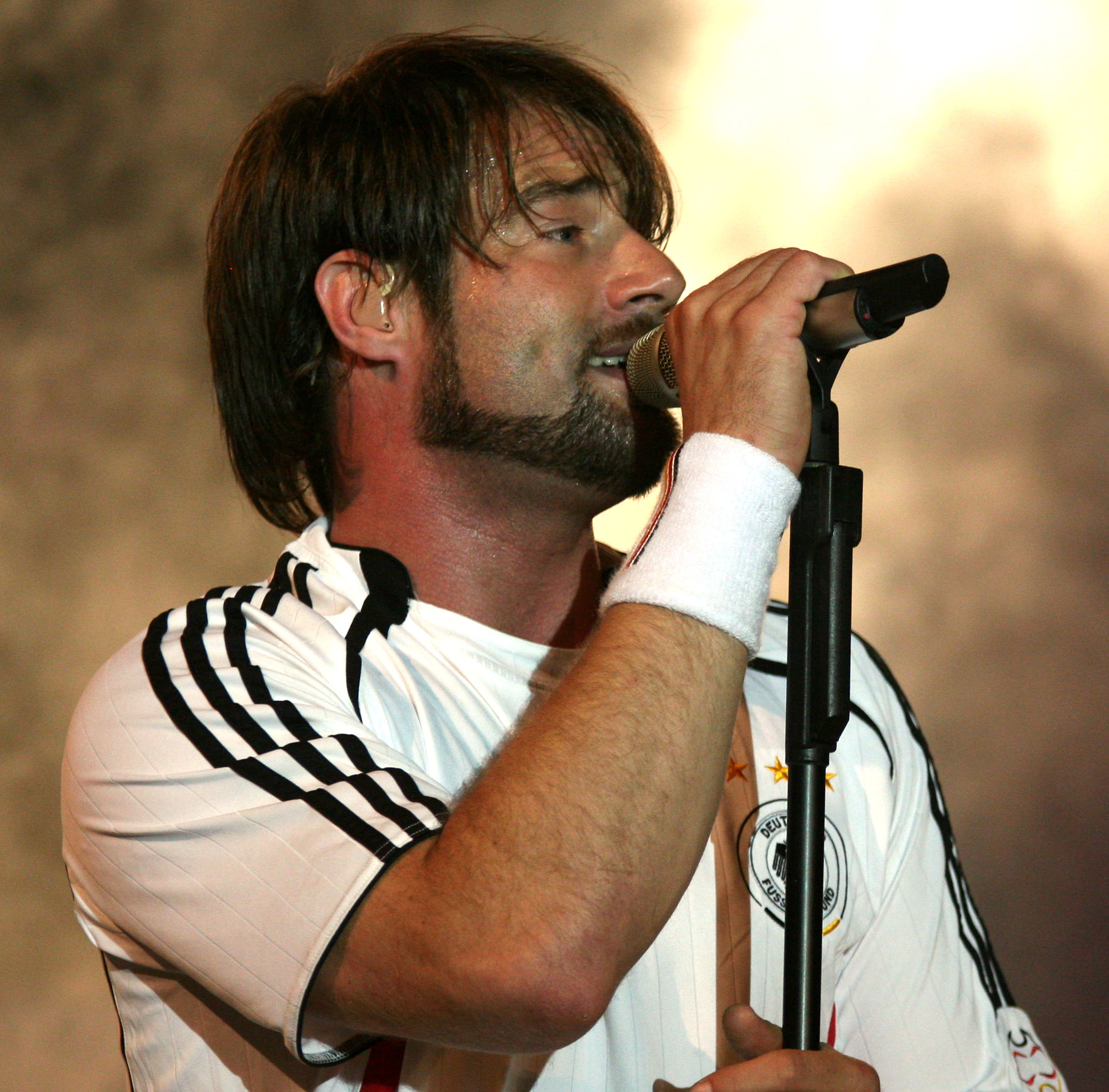
The celebrities who have competed in the fourth season of The Masked Singer, pictured in order of elimination (l-r):
Katrin Müller-Hohenstein ("Schwein"), Franziska van Almsick ("Einhorn"), Henning Baum ("Quokka"), Judith Rakers ("Küken"), Guildo Horn ("Stier"), Thore Schölermann ("Monstronaut"), Thomas Anders ("Schildkröte"), Ross Antony ("Flamingo"), Cassandra Steen ("Leopard"), Sasha ("Dinosaurier")

== Episodes ==
=== Week 1 (16 February) ===
Performances on the first live episode
#	Stage name	Song	Identity	Result
1	Dinosaurier	"Dynamite" by BTS	undisclosed	WIN
2	Leopard	"GoldenEye" by Tina Turner	undisclosed	WIN
3	Küken	"New Soul" by Yael Naim/"Hollaback Girl" by Gwen Stefani	undisclosed	WIN
4	Flamingo	"Sway" by Michael Bublé	undisclosed	RISK
5	Monstronaut	"Born This Way" by Lady Gaga	undisclosed	RISK
6	Stier	"Heroes" by David Bowie/"Seven Nation Army" by The White Stripes	undisclosed	WIN
7	Einhorn	"The Last Unicorn" by America	undisclosed	RISK
8	Quokka	"Insomnia" by Faithless	undisclosed	WIN
9	Schwein	"Sun is Shining" by Bob Marley and the Wailers/"Singin' in the Rain" by Gene Kelly	Katrin Müller-Hohenstein	OUT
10	Schildkröte	"In the Air Tonight" by Phil Collins	undisclosed	WIN

=== Week 2 (23 February) ===
Performances on the second live episode
#	Stage name	Song	Identity	Result
1	Küken	"Jungle Drum" by Emilíana Torrini	undisclosed	RISK
2	Schildkröte	"I'm Still Standing" by Elton John	undisclosed	WIN
3	Monstronaut	"When You Were Young" by The Killers	undisclosed	WIN
4	Flamingo	"2 Become 1" by Spice Girls	undisclosed	WIN
5	Dinosaurier	"I Got You (I Feel Good)" by James Brown	undisclosed	WIN
6	Einhorn	"Lean on Me" by Bill Withers	Franziska van Almsick	OUT
7	Stier	"Don't Stop Me Now" by Queen	undisclosed	WIN
8	Quokka	"Come as You Are" by Nirvana	undisclosed	RISK
9	Leopard	"Survivor" by Destiny's Child	undisclosed	WIN

=== Week 3 (2 March) ===
Performances on the third live episode
#	Stage name	Song	Identity	Result
1	Monstronaut	"T.N.T." by AC/DC	undisclosed	WIN
2	Leopard	"I'll Never Love Again" by Lady Gaga	undisclosed	WIN
3	Quokka	"One" by U2	Henning Baum	OUT
4	Flamingo	"All the Lovers" by Kylie Minogue	undisclosed	RISK
5	Schildkröte	"Way Down We Go" by Kaleo	undisclosed	WIN
6	Dinosaurier	"Rappers Delight" by The Sugar Hill Gang/"Get Lucky" by Daft Punk	undisclosed	WIN
7	Küken	"All About That Bass" by Meghan Trainor	undisclosed	RISK
8	Stier	"You'll Never Walk Alone" by Gerry and the Pacemakers	undisclosed	RISK

=== Week 4 (9 March) ===
Performances on the fourth live episode
#	Stage name	Song	Result	
1	Dinosaurier	"Human" by Rag'n'Bone Man	WIN	
2	Küken	"Supergirl" by Reamonn	RISK	
3	Flamingo	"You Raise Me Up" by Josh Groban	WIN	
4	Stier	"O Fortuna" from Carmina Burana	RISK	
5	Schildkröte	"Who Wants to Live Forever" by Queen	WIN	
6	Monstronaut	"Can't Stop"/"Give It Away" by Red Hot Chili Peppers	RISK	
7	Leopard	"Don't Let the Sun Go Down on Me" by Elton John	WIN	
Sing-off details			Identity	Result
1	Küken	"These Boots Are Made for Walkin'" by Nancy Sinatra	Judith Rakers	OUT
2	Stier	"Let It Go" by Idina Menzel	undisclosed	SAFE
3	Monstronaut	"Careless Whisper" by George Michael	undisclosed	SAFE

=== Week 5 (16 March) – Semi-final ===
Performances on the fifth live episode
#	Stage name	Song	Identity	Result
1	Flamingo	"You Give Love a Bad Name" by Bon Jovi	undisclosed	WIN
2	Stier	"Can't Help Falling in Love" by Elvis Presley	Guildo Horn	OUT
3	Monstronaut	"Bad Boy for Life" by P. Diddy, Black Rob & Mark Curry	undisclosed	RISK
4	Dinosaurier	"All By Myself" by Céline Dion	undisclosed	WIN
5	Schildkröte	"La Vie en rose" by Édith Piaf/"I Was Made for Lovin' You" by Kiss	undisclosed	RISK
6	Leopard	"White Flag" by Bishop Briggs	undisclosed	RISK
Sing-off details
1	Monstronaut	"School's Out" by Alice Cooper/"Should I Stay or Should I Go" by The Clash	Thore Schölermann	OUT
2	Schildkröte	"Afterglow" by Ed Sheeran	undisclosed	SAFE
3	Leopard	"Russian Roulette" by Rihanna	undisclosed	SAFE

=== Week 6 (23 March) – Final ===
- Group number: "Fix You" by Coldplay

==== Round One ====
Performances on the final live episode – round one
#	Stage name	Song	Identity	Result
1	Dinosaurier	"Control" by Zoe Wees/"Single Ladies (Put a Ring on It)" by Beyoncé/"Umbrella" by Rihanna	undisclosed	SAFE
2	Flamingo	"You Are the Reason" by Calum Scott	undisclosed	SAFE
3	Schildkröte	"Adventure of a Lifetime" by Coldplay	Thomas Anders	OUT
4	Leopard	"Habanera" by Georges Bizet/"Never Enough" by Loren Allred	undisclosed	SAFE

==== Round Two ====
Performances on the final live episode – round two
#	Stage name	Song	Identity	Result
1	Dinosaurier	"Angels" by Robbie Williams	undisclosed	SAFE
2	Flamingo	"Venus" by Shocking Blue/"Vogue" by Madonna	Ross Antony	THIRD
3	Leopard	"Angel" by Sarah McLachlan	undisclosed	SAFE

==== Round Three ====
Performances on the final live episode – round three
#	Stage name	Song	Identity	Result
1	Dinosaurier	"Rappers Delight" by The Sugar Hill Gang/"Get Lucky" by Daft Punk	Sasha	WINNER
2	Leopard	"Survivor" by Destiny's Child	Cassandra Steen	RUNNER-UP

== Reception ==
=== Ratings ===
Episode	Original airdate	Timeslot	Viewers (in millions)		Share (in %)		Source
Episode	Original airdate	Timeslot	Household	Adults 14–49	Household	Adults 14–49	Source
1	16 February 2021	Tuesdays 8:15 pm	3.55	2.10	12.3	26.7	
2	23 February 2021	Tuesdays 8:15 pm	3.38	2.04	11.9	26.1	
3	2 March 2021	Tuesdays 8:15 pm	3.15	1.83	10.7	22.5	
4	9 March 2021	Tuesdays 8:15 pm	3.23	1.87	11.4	23.8	
5	16 March 2021	Tuesdays 8:15 pm	3.47	2.00	12.2	25.2	
6	23 March 2021	Tuesdays 8:15 pm	3.75	2.09	14.0	27.9	
Average			3.42	1.99	12.1	25.4	
