= Löhlein =

Löhlein is a German surname. Notable people with the surname include:

- Henning Löhlein (born 1965), German illustrator
- Hermann Löhlein (1847–1901), German obstetrician and gynecologist
