= 1965 in German television =

This is a list of German television related events from 1965.

== Events ==
- 27 February - Ulla Wiesner is selected to represent Germany at the 1965 Eurovision Song Contest with her song "Paradies, wo bist du?". She is selected to be the tenth German Eurovision entry during Ein Lied für Neapel held at the NDR in Hamburg.

== Debuts ==
=== ARD ===
- 11 April – The Satin Slipper (Der seidene Schuh, 1965)
- 9 May – Die Unverbesserlichen (1965–1971)
- 25 September - Beat-Club (1965-1972)

== Television shows ==
=== 1950s ===
- Tagesschau (1952–present)

=== 1960s ===
- heute (1963–present)

== Networks and services ==
=== Launches ===
Network	Type	Launch date	Notes	Source
Norddeutsches Fernsehen	Cable television	4 January		
WDR Fernsehen	Cable television	17 December		

== Births ==
- 7 September - Jörg Pilawa, TV host
- 21 December - Anke Engelke, Canadian-born comedian & actress
