= Katrin Müller-Hohenstein =

German sports journalist

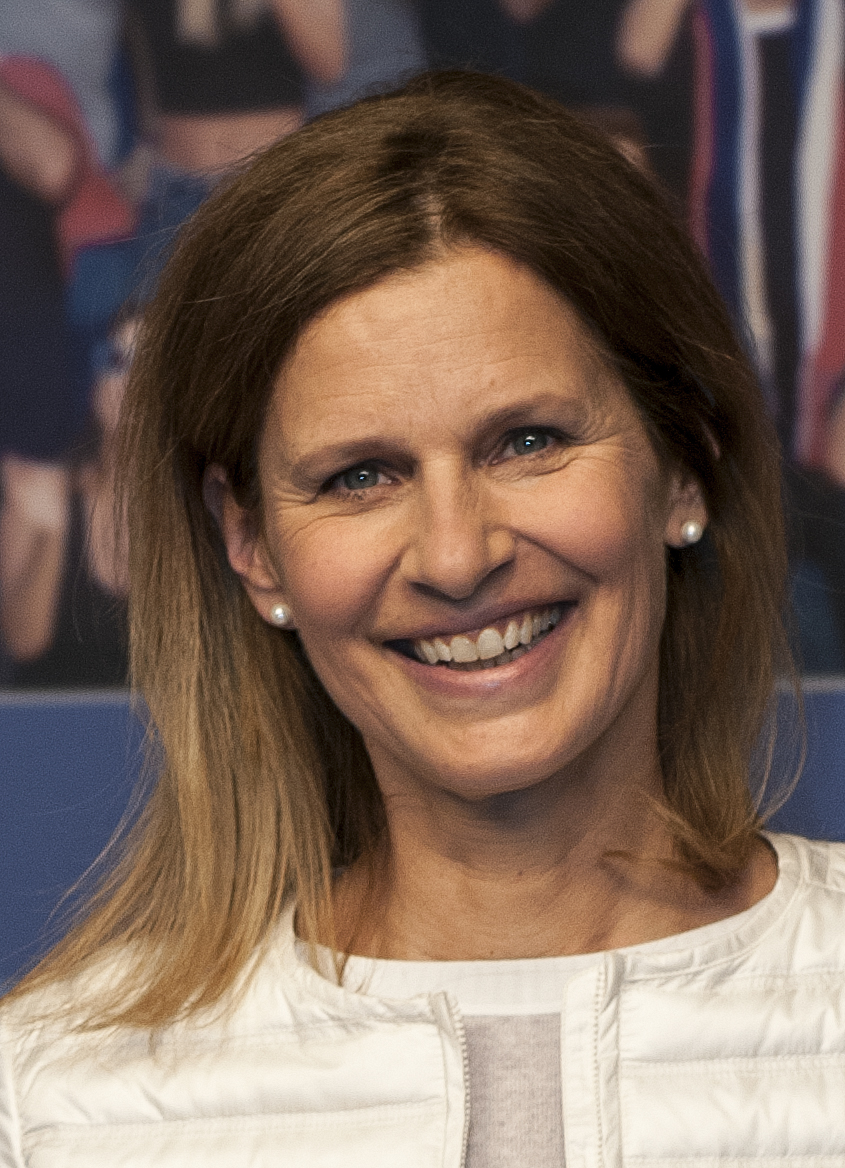
Müller-Hohenstein in 2016

Katrin Müller-Hohenstein (born 2 August 1965, in Erlangen) is a German television sport journalist.

== Life ==
Since 2007 she worked for the Bayerischer Rundfunk. Since January 2006 Müller-Hohenstein works for ZDF and presents since 28 January 2006 as successor of Rudi Cerne changing weekly with Sven Voss and Jochen Breyer Das aktuelle sportstudio. From 1996 to 2007 she was married to radio host Stefan Parrisius (born 1963). Together they have one son (born 1995). Müller-Hohenstein currently lives in Munich. She is a member of the FC Bayern München.

At the 2021 European Football Championship, Müller-Hohenstein took over the studio moderation again for the first time after a longer break, alternating with Jochen Breyer. At the Summer Olympics in Tokyo, she was again in action as a studio moderator, alternating with Rudi Cerne. At the 2022 Winter Olympics in Beijing, she again hosted from the studio, alternating with Rudi Cerne. At the 2022 World Cup, she again alternated with Jochen Breyer as studio host.

== Awards ==
- 2012: Goldene Kamera
