= Henning Löhlein =

German illustrator

- Born: 1965 (age 60–61) Frankfurt / Main, Germany
- Area: Illustrator

Henning Löhlein, (born 1965, in Germany) is an illustrator based in Bristol. His work has been featured in various media outlets, including The Guardian, The Observer and The Financial Times. He has illustrated over thirty books to date, collaborating with authors of children's books from Britain and Germany, such as Werner Holzwarth, Katja Reider, Manfred Mai, Gudrun Pausewang. Since 1996 he has been consistently selected for the annual exhibition of the German Cartoon Prize.

== Early life and career ==
Henning Löhlein grew up in Bonn, Germany, studied three years art In the South of France, before coming to Bristol on an Erasmus exchange, where he finished his studies in illustration, before doing an MA at Brighton University in sequential illustration.

Illustrated children's books

My Name is Mr Fox by Shen Roddie Macmillan Publishers ISBN 1-405-02208-6

Ringo Rabe traut sich was by Manfred Mai Ravensburger Buchverlag ISBN 978-3-473-44571-4

Kleeorg und Kleeopatra by Werner Holzwarth Bajazzo ISBN 978-3-905871-24-1

Die Oma im Drachenbauch by Gudrun Pausewang Gerstenberg Verlag ISBN 978-3-8369-5275-0

Dein kleiner Kummerkiller by Katja reider Hoffmann und Campe ISBN 978-3-455-38059-0

Ganz schön schlau die dumme Sau by Werner Holzwarth terzio Verlag ISBN 978-3-89835-866-8

Harry, Rabbit on the Run by Adam Frost Macmillan Children's Books ISBN 978-0330447126

Ralph the Magic Rabbit by Adam Frost Macmillan Children's Books ISBN 978-0330436021

Die Weihnachtshäsin von Adriana Dorsett Hoffmann und Campe ISBN 978-3455380286
