= Academy Fantasia season 7 =

Academy Fantasia
- Season 7

Release
- Original network: True Visions
- Original release: June 27 – September 18, 2010

Season chronology
- ← Previous; Season 6 Next → Season 8

Academy Fantasia, Season 7 is the seventh season of Academy Fantasia which premiered on True Visions on June 27, 2010.

Por (V12), Annop Thongborisut won in the competition, and is the youngest person to ever won the show, at the age of 16 by the time he won.

== Changes from Season 6 ==
This is the first season to lower the age of contestant limit down to only 15 years old and the upper age limit was up to 25 years old, changing from the age of 18 to 28 from the first six seasons. It is surprised that all of Top 100 finalists from first audition round, both regional & online auditions, will go into the AF house. The judges will eliminate 88 of them in the first week concert, to only Top 12 for the eleven weeks competition.

Like the Season 6 the immunity idol still could help the contestants being safe from the elimination in the event of, if they received the least popular vote of the week. However, in the beginning of the concert week 7, it was announced that this immune rule would be stopped, which would be effective since week 7.

== Auditions ==
There were two channel for auditions, Live and Online. The contestants were required to between the ages of 15 and 25 years old who are not embedded with music recording contracts.

The Live Auditions were held in the following cities:

- The South district, Surat Thani
- The North district, Chiangmai
- The Northeast district, Nakhon Ratchasima
- The Center district, Bangkok

== Semi-finalists ==
The Top 100 finalists (50 from live audition and 50 from online audition) were announced and got a chance to practice themselves for a show in the AF house for a week. The final audition was also the first week concert of this season, which was held at Impact Arena, which was usually hosted the final concert for other seasons.

After their show, the Top 100 finalists were cut off to Top 50, and Top 25, which mixed of 12 boys and 13 girls. At the end of the concert, the winners of AF in season 1-6 came to announce the list of Top 12 contestants of this season. And lastly the result was shown with 6 boys and 6 girls would still in the running for this eleven weeks, and returned to Thunder Dome, Muang Thong Thani, for weekly concerts of weeks 2-11.

In this season, there was no any contestant from the online audition could get through Top 12. This is the first time since Academy Fantasia started to extend a channel of audition to an online registration (since season 4).

It was noticed there were many 18-year-old contestants get through this Top 12, Grape (V2), New (V4), Natty (V5), & Pum (V7) all are 15-year-old girls, while Boss (V10) & Por (V12) are 16-year-old boys, Paprae (V9) & Mark (V11) are both 17.

== Concert summaries ==
=== Week 1 - Top 100 Semi Final Audition ===
Original Airdate: July 3, 2010

Show	Song	Artist
1	"Academy Fantasia's Theme Song"	Members of AF1 - AF7
2	"Na Thee Thee Ying Yai" by Christina Aguilar	AF7 The Top 100 Finalists
3	"Khob Khun Thee Rak Kan" by Potato	Boy AF2, Tui AF3, Tol AF4, & Zani with AF7 The Top 100 Finalists AF6
4	"Lok Lan Pee" by Wan AF2	Wan AF2, Preaw AF2, Dong AF3, Tee AF4, Jack AF4, Ron AF5, & Koonjae-Sal AF6
5	"Fa Song Chan Ma" by Palmy	Mint AF3, Puifai AF4, Green AF5, Beau AF5
6	"Rak Nak Naen" by Thongchai McIntyre	Various Artists (AF1 - AF6)
7	"When You Believe" by Mariah Carey & Whitney Houston	Jeen AF1, Patcha AF2, Lookpong AF4, Eingeing AF4, & Ann AF6
8	"Khon Mai Sam Khan" by Palapol	Joomjim AF1, Tune AF3, & Pump AF5
9	"Live & Learn" by Kamala Sukosol	Znam AF1, Por AF1, Good AF5, Prink AF5, Nooknick AF6, & Newty AF6
10	"Piang Kra Sib" by Blackhead	Papang AF4 & Tee AF4
11	"Chai Cha Na" by Pod Moderndog & Santi Loonpe	Vit AF1, Aof AF2, Tui AF3, Nat AF4, Natthew AF5, Zani AF6

Announcer	Top 12	Nominees (Code)	Finalists
Vit AF1	1	Ink (008) VS Natty (019)	Natty (V5)
Vit AF1	2	Green (011) VS Dew (084)	Green (V8)
Aof AF2	3	Bell^{3} (043) VS Mark (073)	Mark^{1} (V11)
Aof AF2	4	Noey (029) VS New (007)	New (V4)
Tui AF3	5	Boss (023) VS Nick (049)	Boss (V10)
Tui AF3	6	Meen (002) VS Pam (080)	Meen (V1)
Nat AF4	7	Loukked (045) VS Grape (090)	Grape (V2)
Nat AF4	8	Pum (046) VS Koh (091)	Pum (V7)
Natthew AF5	9	Kacha^{4} (025) VS Por (096)	Por (V12)
Natthew AF5	10	Ton^{2} (021) VS Ben (042)	Ben (V3)
Zani AF6	11	Namkhang (067) VS Frame^{5} (071)	Namkhang (V6)
Zani AF6	12	Paprae (024) VS May^{6} (035) VS Jim (054)	Paprae (V9)

^{1}Mark (V11) withdrew from the competition at the end of the concert week 3.
^{2}Ton (V13) replaced Mark (V11) and showed his first performance on the concert week 4.
^{3}Bell later re-auditioned and was selected as one of the 24 finalist of Season 10 (2013), where she finished at fifth place.
^{4}Kacha later re-auditioned and was selected as one of the 24 finalist of Season 8 (2011), where he finished at third place.
^{5}Frame later re-auditioned and was selected as one of the 24 finalist of Season 8 (2011), where he finished at fourth place.
^{6}May later re-auditioned and was selected as one of the 12 finalist of Season 12 (2015), where she finished at eleventh place.

=== Week 2 - Rock ===
Original Airdate: July 10, 2010

Code	Contestant	Song
V1	Meen	"Khwam Dan Thu Rang Sung" by Marsha Wattanapanich
V2	Grape	"Ja Rak Rue Ja Rai" by Klear
V3	Ben	"Sia Mai" by Micro
V4	New	"Klab Duek" by Mai Charoenpura
V5	Natty	"Khwak Hua Jai" by Mai Charoenpura
V6	Namkhang	"Nam Lai" by Silly Fools
V7	Pum	"Dai Yin Mai" by Da Endorphine
V8	Green	"Pa Lang Rak" by Hin Lek Fire
V9	Paprae	"Len Khong Sung" by Klear
V10	Boss	"Foon" by Big Ass
V11	Mark	"Chan Yu Trong Ni" by Blackhead
V12	Por	"Sak Wan Chan Ja Dee Po" by Bodyslam

- Did not perform: Mark (V11)

At the beginning of the concert week 2, they announced that there was no any elimination for the night. All of Top 12 contestants would be safe, even Mark (V11) who did not make a performance but still on the running onward. However, the votes for week 2 would be kept for the upcoming week, and they didn't declare bottom three results for the week.

=== Week 3 - Hot Debut (During years contestants were born, 1988-1995) ===
Original Airdate: July 17, 2010

Code	Contestant	Song
V1	Meen	"Chan Leri OK" by Penpak Sirikul
V2	Grape	"Aj Ja Pen Khon Nee" by Thitima Suttasoontorn
V3	Ben	"Ao A Rai Ma Lek Ko Mai Yom" by Billy Ogan
V4	New	"Ya Yom Pae" by Aom Sunisa
V5	Natty	"Kod Dan" by Saowaluck Leelabutr
V6	Namkhang	"Hai Ther" by Asanee & Wasan
V7	Pum	"Kho Piang Thee Pak Jai" by Maleewan Jemina
V8	Green	"Ying Klai Ying Jeb" by Inka
V9	Paprae	"Mai Yak Rok" by Christina Aguilar
V10	Boss	"Pra Man Nee Rue Plao" by Jetrin Wattanasin
V11	Mark	"Kho Um Noi" by Thongchai McIntyre, & "Keb Ta Wan" by Itti Palangkul
V12	Por	"Mai Rak Ko Ba" by Patiparn Pataweekarn

- Withdrew: Mark (V11)
- Bottom three: New (V4), Green (V8), & Paprae (V9)
- Immuned & Safe from elimination: Green (V8)

After Top 12 finalists had performed in a theme of Hot Debut (Songs during years they were born), the audiences were shocked due to the withdrawal of Mark (V11) at the end of his show. Then, they declared bottom three of the week, and the judges decided to provide the immunity idol to Green (V8). Finally, the popular votes result was announced and the least vote contestant was also Green (V8), so he was safe from this first elimination.

However, it was announced later that the day after the concert week 3, the substitution contestant (probably be one of Top 25 finalists) would be sent into the AF house, replaced Mark (V11) who withdrew from the competition.

=== Week 4 - Korean Songs ===
Original Airdate: July 24, 2010

Code	Contestant	Song
V1	Meen	"Run Devil Run" by Girls' Generation
V2	Grape	"I Don't Care" by 2NE1
V3	Ben	"Heartbreaker" by G-Dragon
V4	New	"Abracadabra" by Brown Eyed Girls
V5	Natty	"Gee" by Girls' Generation
V6	Namkhang	"Again & Again" by 2PM
V7	Pum	"Nobody" by Wonder Girls
V8	Green	"Juliette" by SHINee
V9	Paprae	"Bo Peep Bo Peep" by T-ara
V10	Boss	"Sorry, Sorry" by Super Junior
V12	Por	"Bonamana" by Super Junior
V13	Ton	"Lies" by Big Bang
(All)	Various	"Ring Ding Dong" by SHINee

- Bottom three: Grape (V2), Natty (V5), & Boss (V10)
- Immuned & Safe from elimination: Natty (V5)

It was the second time for this season that the judges could make a right decision on giving the immunity idol to the least vote contestant of the week, Natty (V5) by accidentally. As a result, Top 12 (included Ton (V13) who was a new joiner in the AF house as Top 12) still remain in the competition.

=== Week 5 - Single Show (Contestant's Choice) ===
Original Airdate: July 31, 2010

Code	Contestant	Song
V1	Meen	"The Show" by Lenka
V2	Grape	"Thong Jam Ao Wai" by Lookpong, Eingeing, & Puifai
V3	Ben	"Ko Rang Hang Rak" by Tattoo Colour
V4	New	"Fa Song Chan Ma" by Palmy
V5	Natty	"White Horse" by Taylor Swift
V6	Namkhang	"Thaeb Khad Jai" by Loso
V7	Pum	"Yak Yud We La" by Saranya Songsermsawas
V8	Green	"Who's Loving You" by The Jackson 5
V9	Paprae	"Tha" by Mr.Team
V10	Boss	"Ji Ja" by Silly Fools
V12	Por	"Ya Tham Hai Fa Pid Wang" by Endorphine
V13	Ton	"Khram" by Bodyslam

- Bottom three: Meen (V1), Grape (V2), & Namkhang (V6)
- Immuned & Safe from elimination: Meen (V1)

It was another week that the immunity idol could save the least voted contestant by chance, once again, after last two consecutive weeks in the concert week 3 & 4. Meen (V1), who was immuned from the judges also was declared as the least voted contestant of the week. From this, she was still running on the competition, and all of the rest still remain in the AF house once again.

=== Week 6 - Songs for Mother ===
Original Airdate: August 7, 2010

Code	Contestant	Song
V1	Meen	"Rang Wan Dae Khon Chang Fun" by Jarun Manopetch
V2	Grape	"Rak Ther Thang Mot Khong Hua Jai" by Pause
V3	Ben	"Can't Take My Eyes Off You" by Frankie Valli
V4	New	"Khon Mai Ao Than" by Big Ass
V5	Natty	"Chan Dee Jai Thee Mee Ther" by Boyd Kosiyabong Feat. Mai
V6	Namkhang	"Mae" by Loso
V7	Pum	"Greatest Love Of All" by Whitney Houston
V8	Green	"Right Here Waiting" by Richard Marx
V9	Paprae	"Puea Ther" by Boyd Kosiyabong Feat. Nop Pornchumni
V10	Boss	"Yang Yim Dai" by Palapol
V12	Por	"Nueng Nai Mai Kee Khon" by Sunita Leetikul
V13	Ton	"Rao Rak Mae" by Various Artists from RS

- Bottom three: Meen (V1), Green (V8), & Paprae (V9)
- Immuned: Green (V8)
- Eliminated: Meen (V1)

The concert week 6 was in a theme of songs for mother, which is performed during the upcoming mother's day on August 12. The contestants were surprised from the attending in a show of their mothers for this concert. Finally, the result was shown that one who received the least vote of the week was not the same person who was immuned by judges, so there would definitely be the first elimination of this season. At the end of a concert, Meen (V1) was announced as the first contestant who would leave the competition, and there were only 11 still in the running.

=== Week 7 - Music Festival (International Hits) ===
Original Airdate: August 14, 2010

Code	Contestant	Song
V2	Grape	"Tik Tok" by Kesha
V3	Ben	"I Gotta A Feelin'" by The Black Eyed Peas
V4	New	"You Belong With Me" by Taylor Swift
V5	Natty	"Empire State Of Mind (Part II)" by Alicia Keys
V6	Namkhang	"Built To Last" by Melee
V7	Pum	"Rude Boy" by Rihanna
V8	Green	"Nothin' On You" by B.o.B
V9	Paprae	"Bad Romance" by Lady Gaga
V10	Boss	"Baby" by Justin Bieber
V12	Por	"21 Guns" by Green Day
V13	Ton	"Fire Burning" by Sean Kingston
(All)	Various	"Last Farewell" by Big Bang / "Fire" by 2NE1 / "Digital Bounce" by Se7en

- Top five: Grape (V2), New (V4), Paprae (V9), Por (V12), & Ton (V13)
- Bottom three: Natty (V5), Pum (V7), & Green (V8)
- Eliminated: Green (V8)

At the beginning of the concert week 7, it was declared that there would be no the immunity idol during the last half of this season (Week 7 - 12). The concert was in Music Festival theme, which consisted of three different music categories; R&B, Rock, & Techno-Hiphop. At the end of the show, they announced a list of five contestants, instead of bottom three as usual, and then it was declared that five of them were all the Top 5 popular votes of the week. It was noticed that it was the first time of Pum (V7), who always receive good feedback and comments from judges, of being in the bottom three. However, the final result was shown that Green (V8), who was not eliminated on week 3, received the fewest votes of the night. From this new rule of no the immunity idol, effective in this week, made him get eliminated.

=== Week 8 - Tag Teams (Duet & Battle Songs) ===
Original Airdate: August 21, 2010

Code	Contestant	Song #1 (Duet Songs)
V2 & V10	Grape & Boss	"Tha Le See Dam" by Lula & Tar Paradox
V3 & V4	Ben & New	"Mai Roo Jak Chan Mai Roo Jak Ther" by Da Endorphine & Pop Calories Blah Blah
V5 & V12	Natty & Por	"Prod Song Krai Ma Rak Chan Thee" by Instinct
V6 & V9	Namkhang & Paprae	"Khwam Rak" by Body Slam
V7 & V13	Pum & Ton	"Baeb Nai Thee Ther Ja Rak" by Zeal

Code	Contestant	Song #2 (Battle Songs)
V2-V10 / V5-V12	Grape-Boss VS Natty-Por	"La Lai" by Four & Mod
V3-V4 / V7-V13	Ben-New VS Pum-Ton	"Fight For You" by Golf & Mike
V5-V12 / V3-V4	Natty-Por VS Ben-New	"Yak Yai Lai Yak Lek" by Big Ass
V6-V9 / V2-V10	Namkhang-Paprae VS Grape-Boss	"Od Od" by The Richman Toy
V7-V13 / V6-V9	Pum-Ton VS Namkhang-Paprae	"Kid Hod" by Body Slam Feat. Siriporn Umpaibong

- Bottom three: Grape (V2), Natty (V5), & Paprae (V9)
- Eliminated: Paprae (V9)

=== Week 9 - Songs of Thongchai McIntyre (Musical Part I) ===
Original Airdate: August 28, 2010

Code	Contestant	Song
V2	Grape	"Boomerang"
V3	Ben	"Hua Jai Cham Cham"
V4	New	"Muean Pen Khon Uen Uen"
V5	Natty	"Khon Mai Mee Fan"
V6	Namkhang	"Som Dai"
V7	Pum	"Roo Mai Wa Chan Kid Thueng"
V10	Boss	"Long Si Ja"
V12	Por	"Om Pra Ma Pud"
V13	Ton	"Mai Khaeng Ying Pae"
(All)	Various	"Khwam Suk Khwam Song Jam Mai Mee Thee Sin Sud"

- Bottom three: Natty (V5), Namkhang (V6), & Boss (V10)
- Eliminated: Natty (V5)

=== Week 10 - Thai Contemporary & Country (Musical Part II) ===
Original Airdate: September 4, 2010

Code	Contestant	Song
V2	Grape	"Jan" by Ying Thitikarn
V3	Ben	"Lom Ja" by Thongchai McIntyre
V4	New	"Khwan Khong Riam" by Pongsri Woranuch
V6	Namkhang	"Rak Nee Thee Seven" by Rung Suriya
V7	Pum	"Nad Pop Na Amper" by Pumpuang Duangjan
V10	Boss	"Ok Hak Pak Ban Ni" by Goth Jakraparn
V12	Por	"Saen Saeb" by Palywan Lukpej
V13	Ton	"Pen Sod Tham Mai" by Suraphol Sombatcharoen
(Female)	Various	"Khlong Chueam Rak" by Rakchad Sirichai
(Male)	Various	"Rak Kham Khlong" by Rakchad Sirichai

- Bottom three: Ben (V3), Namkhang (V6), & Pum (V7)
- Eliminated: Ben (V3)

=== Week 11 - Variety Dance ===
Original Airdate: September 11, 2010

Code	Contestant	Song
V2	Grape	"Mai Rak Ther" by Waii
V4	New	"Yu Nan Nan Eek Nid" by Triamphs Kingdom
V6	Namkhang	"Playgirl" by C-Quint
V7	Pum	"Hush Hush (I will survive)" by The Pussycat Dolls
V10	Boss	"Love Me If You Can" by Black Jack
V12	Por	"Rak Kan Mai" by Thongchai McIntyre
V13	Ton	"Rock DJ" by Robbie Williams
(All)	Various	"Rainism" by Bi Rain / "10 Points Out of 10" by 2PM

- Bottom three: Grape (V2), Pum (V7), & Por (V12)
- Eliminated: Pum (V7)

=== Week 12 - Grand Finale ===
Original Airdate: September 18, 2010

Code	Contestant	Song
V2	Grape	"Rak Thao Rai Ko Yang Mai Po" by Lookpad Chollanun "Hai Jai Pen Ther" by Four-Mod
V4	New	"Lao Su Kan Fang" by Thongchai McIntyre "Rak Khue..." by Gift Monotone
V6	Namkhang	"Ying Sung Ying Nao" by PACK4 "Fak Liang" by Sweet Mullet
V10	Boss	"Ko Hok" by Tattoo Colour "Fa" by Tattoo Colour
V12	Por	"Thee Sung" by Pongsak Rattanapong "Bang Oen Lok Klom Prom Li Khit" by Potato
V13	Ton	"It's My Life" by Bon Jovi "Kla Po Mai" by Potato

Special Show

(In order of performance)

Show	Song	Performance by
1	"Ther Poo Mai Pae" by Thongchai McIntyre	Green (V8)
2	"Duai Rak Lae Puk Pan" by Thongchai McIntyre	Meen (V1)
3	"A Moment Like This" by Leona Lewis	Pum (V7)
4	"Kho Pen Khon Khong Ther" by Sunitta Letikul	Nutty (V5)
5	"Ta Kai Dao" by Raywatt Phutthinan	Paprae (V9)
6	"Thuk Yang" by Scrubb	Ben (V3)

- Fifth Runner-Up: Grape (V2)
- Fourth Runner-Up: Namkhang (V6)
- Third Runner-Up: New (V4)
- Second Runner-Up: Boss (V10)
- First Runner-Up: Ton (V13)
- The Winner: Por (V12)

== Contestants ==
=== In order of elimination ===
(ages stated are at time of competition)

Code	Contestant, Ages	Hometown	Ranking
V11	Mark, Vittavas Taokamlue (17)	Chiang Mai	Withdrew in Week 3
V1	Meen, Karnkanueng Netsrithong (22)	Bangkok	Eliminated in Week 6
V8	Green, Jirapat Sirichai (21)	Bangkok	Eliminated in Week 7
V9	Paprae, Taranya Manoleehakul (17)	Bangkok	Eliminated in Week 8
V5	Natty, Natchapat Pipatchaisiri (15)	Bangkok	Eliminated in Week 9
V3	Ben, Benjami Varney (18)	Chiang Mai	Eliminated in Week 10
V7	Pum, Pawarat Kittimongkollert (15)	Bangkok	Eliminated in Week 11
V2	Grape, Sudarat Paopatimakorn (15)	Nonthaburi	Fifth Runner-Up
V6	Namkhang, Chayanat Yupenkaew (21)	Ayudhaya	Fourth Runner-Up
V4	New, Kontanan Wattanachatwong (15)	Bangkok	Third Runner-Up
V10	Boss, Thanabatr Ngamkamolchai (16)	Lopburi	Second Runner-Up
V13	Ton, Nattawat Deewongkij (18)	Bangkok	Replaced in Week 3 & First Runner-Up
V12	Por, Annop Thongborisut (16)	Uttaradit	The Winner

== Summaries ==
=== Elimination chart ===
Season 7
Female	Male	Top 25	Withdrew	Replaced	Top 12	Top 6	Runner-Up	Winner

Bottom	Bottom-Saved	Eliminated	None-Elim

Stage:		Semi-Finals	Finals										Grand Finale
Week:		1	2	3	4	5	6	7	8	9	10	11	12
Place	Contestant	Result											
1	Por	Top 12						Top 5				Btm	Winner
2	Ton	Top 25		RP				Top 5					Runner-Up
3	Boss	Top 12			Btm					Btm			Finalist
4	New	Top 12		Btm				Top 5					Finalist
5	Namkhang	Top 12				Btm		saved		Btm	Btm		Finalist
6	Grape	Top 12			Btm	Btm		Top 5	Btm			Btm	Finalist
7	Pum	Top 12						Btm			Btm	Elim	
8	Ben	Top 12									Elim		
9	Natty	Top 12			Saved			Btm	Btm	Elim			
10	Paprae	Top 12		Btm			Btm	Top 5	Elim				
11	Green	Top 12		Saved			Saved	Elim					
12	Meen	Top 12				Saved	Elim						
-	Mark	Top 12	Did Not Perform	WD									
Semi- Finals	Bell	Top 25											
Semi- Finals	Dew	Top 25											
Semi- Finals	Frame	Top 25											
Semi- Finals	Ink	Top 25											
Semi- Finals	Jim	Top 25											
Semi- Finals	Kacha	Top 25											
Semi- Finals	Kho	Top 25											
Semi- Finals	Loukked	Top 25											
Semi- Finals	May	Top 25											
Semi- Finals	Nick	Top 25											
Semi- Finals	Noey	Top 25											
Semi- Finals	Pam	Top 25											

=== Professional trainers ===
Principal

- Sattha Satthathip
- Orawan Yenpoonsook

Voice Trainers

- Saovanit Nawapan (Head)
- Attapol Muncharoen
- Viriyapa Chansuwong

Dance Trainers

- Pattarawarin Timkul (Head)

Acting Trainers

- Songyos Sukmakanan (Head)
- Rossukon Kongket

=== Judges ===
- Suthee Sangserichon (Main)
- Prakasit Bosuwan
- Vanessa Guntsopon
- Thana Laowasut
- Jeerasak Panpoom
- Dares Raksarak
- Manrat Tumkanont
- Sumet Ong-arj
- Marut Sarowart
