= Academy Fantasia season 8 =

Academy Fantasia
- Season 8

Release
- Original network: True Visions

Season chronology
- ← Previous; Season 7 Next → Season 9

Academy Fantasia, Season 8 is the eighth season of Academy Fantasia, premiered on True Visions on 26 June 2011.

== Changes from Season 7 ==
Instead of the normal two audition channels, Live and Online, the 8th season introduced the third channel dubbed the Academic Institutions, where schools or universities could send their student in the name of the institute to participate the audition. 12 contestants who were selected by the judging panel will be eligible to compete in the house immediately without having to audition again with the participants from live and Online channels, and will receive their own V number to use in the competition. As a results, the number of contestants participated season 8 increase from the normal 12 finalists into 24 finalists, when combined with 12 contestants selected from the Live and Online Audition participants, made season 8 having the highest number of contestants with the V number for the competition in the show's history. The number of 24 contestants with the V number was after repeated on season 10 (2013). However, the judging panel judged that only 9 Academic-Institutions audition participants were qualified to attend the competition as a finalist, resulting in the number of the finalists from the Live and Online audition increased from 12 to 15 contestants.

However, after the season was premiered, it was announced that the main finalists of season 8 would still consists of 12 contestants, similar to season 4 (2007) and season 5 (2008) where the starting number of the seasons' finalists had more than twelve as well. Which means the 24 finalists had to compete for the final 12 spot in the first three weeks of the season. In which, each weeks of the first three weeks, four contestants who received the fewest popular votes, two from male side and two from female side, will be eliminated until there will be only 12 contestants left in the competition, after that, the main competition of the final 12 will begin.

== Auditions ==
There were three channel for auditions, Live, Online and Academic institutions audition. The contestants were required to between the ages of 15 and 25 years old who are not embedded with music recording contracts.

The Live Auditions were held in the following cities:

- The South district, Surat Thani
- The Northeast district, Nakhon Ratchasima
- The North district, Chiangmai
- The Center district, Bangkok

== Concert summaries ==
=== Top 24 - Semi-finals (Week 1) ===
Mentor: N/A

Males

Code	Contestant	Song (original artist)	Result
V1	Tide	"หนอนผีเสื้อ" (หนู มิเตอร์)	Advanced
V3	Kacha	"เธอจะอยู่กับฉันตลอดไป" (Clash)	Advanced
V6	Potay	"เปลี่ยน" (ETC)	Advanced
V9	Ton	"Forget You" (Cee Lo Green)	Advanced
V10	James	"คือเธอหรือยัง" (อ๊อฟ ปองศักดิ์)	Advanced
V11	Tum	"Unlovable" (Mild)	Eliminated
V17	Friendship	"เทพีบ้านไพร" (กุ้ง สุทธิราช)	Eliminated
V18	Beer	"โกหก" (Tattoo Color)	Advanced
V19	Team	"ให้ฉันดูแลเธอ" (แหนม รณเดช)	Bottom 3
V20	Aon	"อย่าคิดเลย" (Peacemaker)	Advanced
V21	Frame	"ลืมไปก่อน" (Buddha Bless)	Advanced
V23	Tao	"เพียงพอ" (Potato)	Advanced

Females

Code	Contestant	Song (original artist)	Result
V2	Praewa	"ให้เลวกว่านี้" (ปาน ธนพร)	Advanced
V4	Yuki	"Born This Way" (Lady Gaga)	Advanced
V5	Pik	"อายแสงนีออน" (พุ่มพวง ดวงจันทร์)	Advanced
V7	Lynn	"Bring Me To Life" (Evanescence)	Advanced
V8	Poyzian	"น้ำตาคือคำตอบ" (Fahrenheit)	Eliminated
V12	Ann	"Hallelujah" (Alexandra Burke)	Advanced
V13	Waew	"ผิดที่เธอ" (ปนัดดา เรืองวุฒิ)	Eliminated
V14	Earng	"ช้าไปไหมเธอ" (พัดชา เอนกอายุวัฒน์)	Advanced
V15	Praew	"หม้ายขันหมาก" (พุ่มพวง ดวงจันทร์)	Advanced
V16	Wei Wei	"Halo" (Beyoncé Knowles)	Advanced
V22	Dew	"ดาวเรืองดาวโรย" (พุ่มพวง ดวงจันทร์)	Advanced
V24	Joy	"สักวันหนึ่ง" (Boyd Kosiyabong Feat. Marisa Sukosol)	Bottom 3

Group Performances

- Males - "อยู่บำรุง" (ว่าน ธนกฤต)
- Females - "ห้ามทิ้ง" (อะตอม ไมค์ไอดอล)
- Various Artists - "Too Much, So Much, Very Much" (Thongchai McIntyre)

=== Top 20 - Semi-finals (Week 2) ===
Mentor: สุนิตา ลีติกุล

Males

Code	Contestant	Duet Song (original artist)	Result
V1	Tide	"One Last Cry" (Brian McKnight)	Advanced
V9	Ton	"One Last Cry" (Brian McKnight)	Advanced
V3	Kacha	"เจ้าหญิง" (Boyd Kosiyabong)	Advanced
V20	Aon	"เจ้าหญิง" (Boyd Kosiyabong)	Advanced
V6	Potay	"พูดไม่คิด" (Season 5)	Advanced
V21	Frame	"พูดไม่คิด" (Season 5)	Advanced
V10	James	"คนไม่พิเศษ" (B5)	Advanced
V19	Team	"คนไม่พิเศษ" (B5)	Eliminated
V18	Beer	"รักเธอตลอดกาล" (โดม ปกรณ์ ลัม)	Eliminated
V23	Tao	"รักเธอตลอดกาล" (โดม ปกรณ์ ลัม)	Bottom 3

Females

Code	Contestant	Duet Song (original artist)	Result
V2	Praewa	"A Song For You" (Whitney Houston)	Advanced
V12	Ann	"A Song For You" (Whitney Houston)	Advanced
V4	Yuki	"Price Tag" (Jessy J Feat. B.o.B)	Advanced
V16	Wei Wei	"Price Tag" (Jessy J Feat. B.o.B)	Advanced
V5	Pik	"ห้วใจถวายวัด" (พุ่มพวง ดวงจันทร์)	Eliminated
V22	Dew	"ห้วใจถวายวัด" (พุ่มพวง ดวงจันทร์)	Advanced
V7	Lynn	"แด่เธอที่รัก" (Klear)	Advanced
V24	Joy	"แด่เธอที่รัก" (Klear)	Bottom 3
V14	Earng	"เพียงครึ่งใจ" (พัดชา เอนกอายุวัฒน์)	Eliminated
V15	Praew	"เพียงครึ่งใจ" (พัดชา เอนกอายุวัฒน์)	Advanced

Group Performances

- Tide, Ton, Ann, Earng & Wei Wei - "ไม่ต้องมีคำบรรยาย" (Mr.Team)
- Praewa, Pik, James, Team & Joy - "รักไม่ต้องการเวลา" (Klear)
- Kacha, Potay, Praew, Aon & Dew - "หัวใจผูกกัน" (Boyd Kosiyabong)
- Yuki, Lynn, Beer, Frame & Tao - "ทุ้มอยู่ในใจ" (Big Ass)

=== Top 16 - Semi-finals (Week 3) ===
Mentor: ปาน ธนพร

Males

Code	Contestant	Song (original artist)	Result
V1	Tide	"เธอคนเดียว" (Thongchai McIntyre)	Bottom 3
V3	Kacha	"Angels" (Robbie Williams)	Advanced
V6	Potay	"Aroma" (บี พีระพัฒน์)	Eliminated
V9	Ton	"พูดตรงๆ" (บี พีระพัฒน์)	Advanced
V10	James	"อยู่ที่ไหน" (โต๋ ศักดิ์สิทธิ์)	Advanced
V20	Aon	"Eternity" (Robbie Williams)	Eliminated
V21	Frame	"I'm Yours" (Jason Mraz)	Advanced
V23	Tao	"อย่าทำแบบนี้ไม่ว่ากับใครเข้าใจไหม" (Thongchai McIntyre)	Advanced

Females

Code	Contestant	Song (original artist)	Result
V2	Praewa	"เพลงของเธอ" (ปาน ธนพร)	Bottom 3
V4	Yuki	"ไม่ต้องรู้ว่าเราคบกันแบบไหน" (Da Endorphine)	Eliminated
V7	Lynn	"ขอไปให้ถึงดาว" (ปาน ธนพร)	Advanced
V12	Ann	"รักครั้งสุดท้าย" (สุนิตา ลีติกุล)	Advanced
V15	Praew	"ดาว" (B5)	Advanced
V16	Wei Wei	"ตะวันยังมีให้เห็น" (อ๊อฟ ปองศักดิ์)	Eliminated
V22	Dew	"ขอเป็นคนของเธอ" (สุนิตา ลีติกุล)	Advanced
V24	Joy	"Stand Up For Love" (La Diva)	Advanced

Group Performances

- Males - "หยุด" (Groove Riders)
- Females - "ลมหายใจ" (Mr.Z)
- Various Artists - "ขอบคุณ" (ป๊อด Moderndog & บุรินทร์ Feat. Palmy)
- Various Artists - "เกมเกียรติยศ" (จักรพรรณ์ อาบครบุรี)

=== Top 12 - Tata Young / Jirasak Parnpum ===
Mentor: Tata Young & Jirasak Parnpum

Tata's Choice

Code	Contestant	Song (original by Tata Young)	Result
V2	Praewa	"El Nin-Yo!"	Bottom 3
V7	Lynn	"Burning Out"	Safe
V12	Ann	"Sexy, Naughty, Bitchy"	Safe
V15	Praew	"I Think Of You "	Safe
V22	Dew	"Come Rain Come Shine"	Eliminated
V24	Joy	"For You I Will"	Safe

Jirasak's Choice

Code	Contestant	Song (original by Jirasak Parnpum)	Result
V1	Tide	"ทางใครทางมัน"	Safe
V3	Kacha	"คนของเธอ"	Safe
V9	Ton	"เหตุผล"	Safe
V10	James	"คือฉันรักเธอ"	Bottom 3
V21	Frame	"นักโทษประหาร"	Safe
V23	Tao	"เลิกรา"	Safe

Group Performances

- Praewa, Lynn & Ann - "โอ๊ะ โอ๊ย" (Tata Young)
- Praew, Dew & Joy - "รบกวนมารักกัน" (Tata Young)
- Tide, Kacha & Tao - "เพลงลูกกรุง" (Jirasak Parnpum)
- Ton, Jame & Frame - "ราตรีสวัสดิ์" (Jirasak Parnpum)

=== Top 11 - Heartbroken ===
Mentor: Boy Peacemaker

Males

Code	Contestant	Song (original artist)	Result
V1	Tide	"จำทำไม" (Tattoo Colour)	Bottom 3
V3	Kacha	"ทนพิษบาดแผลไม่ไหว" (Potato)	Safe
V9	Ton	"ใจกลางความเจ็บปวด" (Crescendo)	Safe
V10	James	"เปราะบาง" (Bodyslam)	Safe
V21	Frame	"แพ้คำว่ารัก" (Calories Blah Blah)	Safe
V23	Tao	"รักคนมีเจ้าของ" (ไอ.. น้ำ)	Safe

Females

Code	Contestant	Song (original artist)	Result
V2	Praewa	"วอน" (The Peachband)	Safe
V7	Lynn	"น้ำเต็มแก้ว" (Endorphine)	Safe
V12	Ann	"ใกล้กัน ยิ่งหวั่นไหว" (แนน วาทิยา)	Eliminated
V15	Praew	"น้อยใจรัก" (ผ่องศรี วรนุช)	Safe
V24	Joy	"ความเจ็บปวด" (Palmy)	Bottom 3

Group Performances

- Tide, Ton & James - "ผู้ชายคนนี้กำลังหมดแรง" (อ๊อฟ)
- Kacha, Frame & Tao - "เงียบๆ คนเดียว" (เบิร์ด ธงไชย)
- Praewa, Ann & Joy - "มารักทำไมตอนนี้" (Am Fine)
- Lynn & Praew - "ผิดไหม" (Fahrenheit)

=== Top 10 - In Love ===
Mentor: TBA

Males

Code	Contestant	Song (original artist)	Result
V1	Tide	"ซมซาน" (Loso)	Eliminated
V3	Kacha	"คิดถึงฉันไหมเวลาที่เธอ" (Taxi)	Safe
V9	Ton	"กันและกัน" (Flure)	Safe
V10	James	"ทำอะไรซักอย่าง" (ป้าง นครินทร์)	Safe
V21	Frame	"พรหมลิขิต" (Jetset'er)	Safe
V23	Tao	"อย่างน้อย" (Big Ass)	Safe

Females

Code	Contestant	Song (original artist)	Result
V2	Praewa	"พูดอีกที" (คริสติน่า อากีร่า)	Bottom 3
V7	Lynn	"พรหมลิขิต" (แนน วาทิยา)	Bottom 3
V15	Praew	"Ooh" (Palmy)	Safe
V24	Joy	"ควักหัวใจ" (ใหม่ เจริญปุระ)	Safe

Group Performances

- Tide & Lynn - "วนาสวาท" (เบิร์ด ธงไชย / หนูนา)
- Praewa & Frame - "หนุ่มบาว สาวปาน" (คาราบาว / ปาน)
- Kacha & Tao - "อยากรู้แต่ไม่อยากถาม" (Calories Blah Blah)
- Ton & Joy - "Always" (Atlantic Starr)
- James & Praew - "เล็กๆ น้อยๆ" (มาลีวัลย์ / ปั่น)

=== Top 9 (First week) - Variety Dance ===
Mentor: Jennifer Kim / Raptor

Males

Code	Contestant	Song (original artist)	Result
V3	Kacha	"ยุ่งน่า" (เจ เจตริน)	Safe
V9	Ton	"Cherry Pink & Apple Blossom White" (Pat Boone)	Safe
V10	James	"Jailhouse Rock" (Elvis Presley)	Bottom 3
V21	Frame	"That's the way I like it" (KC & The Sunshine Band)	Safe
V23	Tao	"Bailamos" (Enrique Iglesias)	Safe

Females

Code	Contestant	Song (original artist)	Result
V2	Praewa	"Oops! I Did It Again" (Britney Spears)	Bottom 3
V7	Lynn	"Lady Marmalade" (Christina Aguilera)	Safe
V15	Praew	"ดาวล้อมเดือน" (Gold Series)	Safe
V24	Joy	"I Should Be So Lucky" (Kylie Minogue)	Non-Eliminated

Group Performances

- Praewa, Lynn, Praew & Joy - "Nobody" (Wonder Girls)
- Kacha, Ton & Tao - "La Bamba" (Los Lobos)
- James & Frame - "เกรงใจ" (Raptor)
- Various Artists - "Summer Nights" (John Travolta and Olivia Newton-John)

=== Top 9 (Second week) - Killer Songs ===
Mentor: TBA

Males

Code	Contestant	Song (original artist)	Result
V3	Kacha	"เมียนานาชาติ" (เพลิน พรหมแดน)	Safe
V9	Ton	"สาวจันทร์กั้งโกบ" (พรศักดิ์ ส่องแสง)	Safe
V10	James	"ปักตะไคร้" (Buddha Bless)	Safe
V21	Frame	"เรื่องบนเตียง" (Peacemaker)	Safe
V23	Tao	"ที่ว่าง" (Pause)	Bottom 3

Females

Code	Contestant	Song (original artist)	Result
V2	Praewa	"ล่องแม่ปิง" (สุนทรี เวชานนท์)	Safe
V7	Lynn	"ชิมิ" (บลูเบอร์รี่)	Eliminated
V15	Praew	"On The Floor" (Jennifer Lopez)	Safe
V24	Joy	"ดีดีกันไว้" (สุกัญญา มิเกล)	Bottom 3

Group Performances

- Praewa & Frame - "Sukiyaki" (Kyu Sakamoto)
- Kacha & Lynn - "Macarena" (Los Del Rio)
- Ton & James - "Guantanamera" (Celia Cruz)
- Praew, Tao & Joy - "Xin Yuan Yang Hu Die Meng" (Huang An)

=== Top 8 - His Majesty The King's Songs, Thai Contemporary & Thai Country ===
Mentor: TBA

Males

Code	Contestant	Song (original artist)	Result
V3	Kacha	"เป็นไปไม่ได้" (ดิ อิมพอสซิเบิ้ล)	Safe
V9	Ton	"พรานทะเล" (สุนทราภรณ์)	Bottom 3
V10	James	"ทาสเทวี" (ชรินทร์ นันทนาคร)	Safe
V21	Frame	"ร้องไห้กับเดือน" (คัมภีร์ฯ)	Safe
V23	Tao	"ขาดคนหุงข้าว" (ยอดรัก)	Safe

Females

Code	Contestant	Song (original artist)	Result
V2	Praewa	"ฝากดิน" (ผ่องศรี วรนุช)	Eliminated
V15	Praew	"สมมุติว่าเขารัก" (สุนทราภรณ์)	Safe
V24	Joy	"สุดท้ายที่กรุงเทพ" (สุนารี ราชสีมา)	Bottom 3

Group Performances

- Praewa & James - "ผัวเมียพอๆ กัน" (สรเพชร / น้องนุช)
- Kacha & Frame - "ชวนน้องแต่งงาน" (ยอดรัก สลักใจ)
- Ton & Praew - "มะนาวไม่มีน้ำ" (ไพรวัลย์ / วิภารัตน์ฯ)
- Tao & Joy - "หนุ่มนาข้าวสาวนาเกลือ" (สรเพชร / น้อง)
- Praewa, Praew & Joy - "ใกล้รุ่ง" (เพลงพระราชนิพนธ์)
- Kacha, James & Tao - "เกิดเป็นไทย ตายเพื่อไทย"
- Ton & Frame - "ชะตาชีวิต" (เพลงพระราชนิพนธ์)
- Various Artists - "แผ่นดินของเรา" (เพลงพระราชนิพนธ์)

=== Top 7 (First Week) - Musical ===
Mentor: TBA

Code	Contestant	Song (original artist)	Result
V3	Kacha	"ก็มันเป็นอย่างนั้น" (บิลลี่ โอแกน)	Safe
V9	Ton	"สุดท้าย" (Peacemaker)	Safe
V10	James	"ทั้งๆ ที่รู้" (อัสนี / วสันต์)	Safe
V15	Praew	"ก้อนหินก้อนนั้น" (โรส ศรินทิพย์)	Safe
V21	Frame	"อยากจะลืม" (อัสนี / วสันต์)	Safe
V23	Tao	"พักตรงนี้" (Thongchai McIntyre)	Safe
V24	Joy	"ช่างไม่รู้เลย" (ตั้ม สมประสงค์)	Safe

Group Performances

- Various Artists - "ยังไงก็บ้านเรา" (เฉลียง)
- Various Artists - "เอาอะไรมาแลกก็ไม่ยอม" (บิลลี่)
- Various Artists - "ของขวัญจากก้อนดิน" (Thongchai McIntyre)
- Various Artists - "จับมือกันไว้" (Thongchai McIntyre)

=== Top 7 (Second Week) - Songs of 'Ohm Chatri' & 'Dee Nitipong' ===
Mentor: TBA

Code	Contestant	Songs (original artist)	Result
V3	Kacha	"คาใจ" (เจ เจตริน) "หมอกหรือควัน" (เบิร์ด)	Advanced
V9	Ton	"เจ็บไปเจ็บมา" (เจ เจตริน) "เพื่อเธอตลอดไป" (ศักดา พัทธสีมา)	Advanced
V10	James	"ทิ้งรักลงแม่น้ำ" (Y Not 7) "คงเดิม" (อัสนี วสันต์)	Bottom 2
V15	Praew	"แค่เสียใจไม่พอ" (แอม เสาวลักษณ์) "ไปด้วยกันนะ" (คริสติน่า)	Advanced
V21	Frame	"ลงเอย" (อัสนี วสันต์) "ขอบใจจริงๆ" (เบิร์ด ธงไชย)	Advanced
V23	Tao	"ชายคนหนึ่ง" (ปีเตอร์) "เหนื่อยไหม" (เบิร์ด ธงไชย)	Advanced
V24	Joy	"ทบทวน" (ปาล์มมี่) "ประวัติศาสตร์" (คริสติน่า)	Eliminated

Code	Contestant	Song (original artist)
V1	Tide	"สักวันต้องได้ดี" (เต๋อ เรวัฒน์)

=== Final - Grand Finale ===
Mentor: TBA

Code	Contestant	Songs (original artist)	Result
V9	Ton	"Your Song" (Ewan McGregor) "แฟนจ๋า" (Thongchai McIntyre)	Winner
V15	Praew	"สัญญากับใจ" (จอมขวัญ กัลยา) "คำตอบของหัวใจ" (Potato)	Runner-Up
V3	Kacha	"The Way You Look At Me" (Christian Bautista) "แสงสุดท้าย" (Bodyslam)	Second-Runner-Up
V21	Frame	"ของขวัญ" (Musketeers) "Umbrella" (Vanilla Sky)	Third-Runner-Up
V23	Tao	"รักเดียวใจเดียว" (รักเดียวใจเดียว) "Haven't Met You Yet" (Michael Bublé)	Fourth-Runner-Up
V10	James	"อย่าเกลียดกันก็พอ" (อ๊อฟ ปองศักดิ์) "ตอกได้ไหมว่าได้ไหม" (เบล สุพล)	Fifth-Runner-Up

Group Performances

- Tide, Weaw, Wei Wei - "Rolling In The Deep" (Glee Cast)
- Praewa, Yuki & Ann - "Telephone" (Lady Gaga)
- Pik & Dew - "โอ้โฮบางกอก" (แมงปอ ชลธิชา)
- Potay, Earng, Team & Joy - "ฤดูที่แตกต่าง" (Room39)
- Lynn, Poyzian & Tum - "อกหัก" (Bodyslam)
- Friendship - "อยากบอกรักเธอ" (ไชยา มิตรชัย)
- Beer & Aon - "เธอที่รัก" (Paradox)

== Finalists ==
=== In order of elimination ===
Code	Contestant	Audition channel	Ranking
V17	Friendship, Satheinpong Jannikom	Academic	Eliminated in Week 1
V13	Waew, Kanokporn Soraudomrit	Academic	Eliminated in Week 1
V11	Tum, Weerayut Wannawijit	Academic	Eliminated in Week 1
V8	Poyzian, Suchaya Petchkratok	Live	Eliminated in Week 1
V19	Team, Warassan Pisittawichai	Live	Eliminated in Week 2
V18	Beer, Krissadapat Sirikitsawat	Live	Eliminated in Week 2
V14	Earng, Paphawarin Gamjornkietsakul	Live	Eliminated in Week 2
V5	Pik, Orawan Nuamsiri	Academic	Eliminated in Week 2
V20	Aon, Auttapong Auttakitkul	Live	Eliminated in Week 3
V16	Wei Wei, Papassorn Han	Live	Eliminated in Week 3
V6	Potay, Piyapong Lekprayoon	Live	Eliminated in Week 3
V4	Yuki, Pimnattha Kudo	Live	Eliminated in Week 3
V22	Dew, Thanida Chaiyakitti	Academic	Eliminated in Week 4
V12	Ann, Nannapat Choochertkeeratiwat	Live	Eliminated in Week 5
V1	Tide, Watcharin Ployngarm	Academic	Eliminated in Week 6
V7	Lynn, Duangporn Yaemmontha	Academic	Eliminated in Week 8
V2	Praewa, Chatthida Pukawanat	Live	Eliminated in Week 9
V24	Joy, Jeerapat Jongkolsongkroh	Academic	Eliminated in Week 11
V10	James, Supawit Boonkasem	Live	Fifth Runner-Up
V23	Tao, Satthaphong Piengpor	Live	Fourth Runner-Up
V21	Frame, Watcharakarn Buabarn	Live	Third Runner-Up
V3	Kacha, Nontanun Anchuleepradit	Live	Second Runner-Up
V15	Praew, Jeerawan Sornsa-ard	Academic	First Runner-Up
V9	Ton, Thanasit Jaturapuch	Live	The Winner

== Summaries ==
=== Elimination chart ===
Female	Male	Top 24	Top 12	Winner

Safe	Bottom	Eliminated	Non-Elim

Stage:		Semi-finals			Finals								
Week:		1	2	3	4	5	6	7	8	9	10	11	12
Place	Contestant	Result											
1
1	Ton			Top 12						Btm 3	1st		Winner
2	Praew			Top 12									Runner-Up
3	Kacha			Top 12									2nd Runner-Up
4	Frame			Top 12									3rd Runner-Up
5	Tao		Btm 3	Top 12					Btm 3				4th Runner-Up
6	James			Top 12	Btm 3			Btm 3				Btm 2	5th Runner-Up
7	Joy	Btm 3	Btm 3	Top 12		Btm 3		Saved	Btm 3	Btm 3		Elim	
8	Preawa			Top 12	Btm 3		Btm 3	Btm 3		Elim			
9	Lynn			Top 12			Btm 3		Elim				
10	Tide			Top 12		Btm 3	Elim						
11	Ann			Top 12		Elim							
12	Dew			Top 12	Elim								
13-16	Yuki			Elim									
13-16	Potay			Elim									
13-16	Wei Wei			Elim									
13-16	Aon			Elim									
17-20	Pik		Elim										
17-20	Earng		Elim										
17-20	Beer		Elim										
17-20	Team	Btm 3	Elim										
21-24	Poyzian	Elim											
21-24	Tum	Elim											
21-24	Waew	Elim											
21-24	Friendship	Elim											

=== Professional trainers ===
Principal

- Narinthorn Na-Bangchang

Voice Trainers

Dance Trainers

Acting Trainers

=== Judges ===
- Tata Young
- Jirasak Panpum
- Suthee Saengserichol
- Prakasit Bosuwan
- Vanessa Gunsopol
