= Supanat Chalermchaichareonkij =

Thai actor, singer, and UBC Academy Fantasia season 2 winner (born 1986)

Supanat Chalermchaichareonkij ศุภณัฐ เฉลิมชัยเจริญกิจ
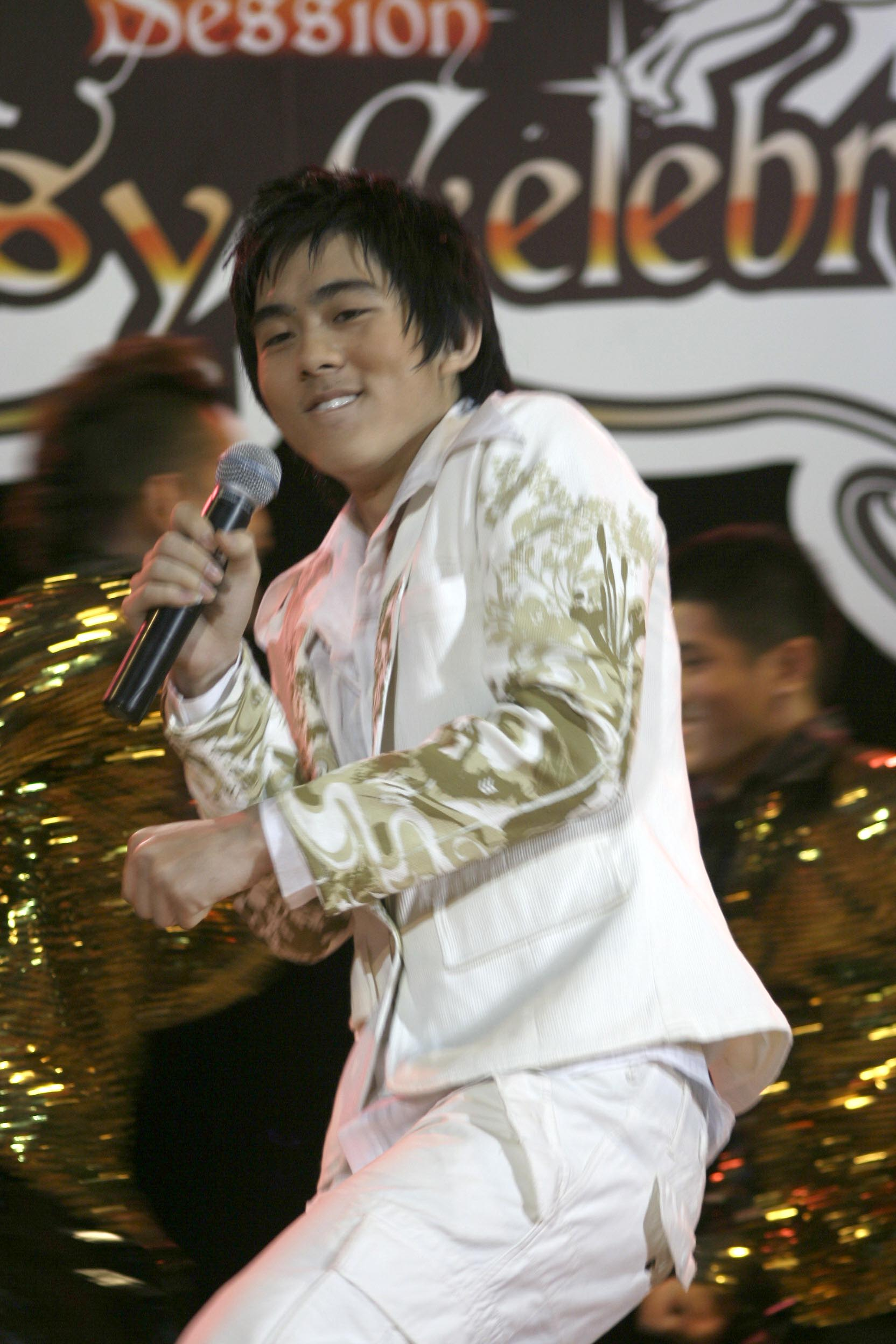
- Supanat in 2005

Background information
- Also known as: Aof
- Born: 31 July 1986 (age 40); Chai Nat, Thailand
- Genres: Pop; luk thung (Thai country)
- Occupations: Singer; actor
- Years active: 2005–present
- Label: True Fantasia
- Website: www.iamaofkrub.com

Supanat "Aof" Chalermchaichareonkij (Thai: ศุภณัฐ เฉลิมชัยเจริญกิจ; RTGS: Suphanat Chaloemchaicharoenkit; born 31 July 1986) is a Thai singer, actor, and the winner of the second season of UBC Academy Fantasia in 2005.

== Biography ==
Chalermchaichareonkij was born in Chai Nat, Thailand. He is the third and youngest son to a family who runs one of the largest construction material businesses in the province. He graduated with a Master of Business Administration from Dhurakij Pundit University in Bangkok.

He began singing at a young age and tried to participate in many singing contests. He won and lost contests on and off until his success on UBC Academy Fantasia season 2, the most popular reality show in Thailand. He won the show with the highest popular vote from an audience across the country.

After winning the reality show, Chalermchaichareonkij, along with all of the second season's contestants, released an album titled Ray Khai Fun (transl. 'Dream for Sale') with the label UBC Fantasia (now called True Fantasia) in October 2005. This followed his debut solo album, Show Aof, in March 2006; this album contains various styles of music including pop, hip-hop, and luk thung, with the pop song "Plian Jai Noi Dai Mai" (transl. 'Could you change your mind?') climbing to number one on Seed 97.5 FM's top 20 chart and broadcast nationwide for three weeks, as well as remaining number one in various national radio charts.

In October 2006, UBC Academy Fantasia contestants from both seasons one and two released an all-star album titled Dream Team. On it, Chalermchaichareonkij shows his talent in the luk thung genre on the song "Hua Jai Wang Wang" ('The Single Man's Heart'), the only of that style on the album.

After his debut and the all-star album, Chalermchaichareonkij shifted towards performing almost entirely luk thung. His second solo album, Rak Thon Rak Nan, features luk thung without pop, with luk thung superstars Aphaphorn Nakhonsawan, Pornchita Na Songkhla, Pamela Bowden, and Luk Nok Supaporn. The title track, "Rak Thon Rak Nan" ('Enduring Love, Lasting Love'), featured all four guests singing together.

In December 2007, he was invited to appear on Just the Two of Us, the most popular reality show hosted by Hunan TV in China, to promote luk thung music.

In 2009, Chalermchaichareonkij released another album, Su Kho Sa Mo Sorn, with Nim from True AF 5. This album covered popular songs and included only one new song, "Phu Chai Ngai Ngai". He released another album, Rue Doo Hang Kwam Rak, in early 2010 from a cooperation between True Fantasia and Sure Audio. It yielded two singles: "Khad Kwan Aob Aun Yang Rang" and "Roy Yim Peun Nam Ta" in late 2010 with other AF winners from seasons 1–6.

Besides these albums, Chalermchaichareonkij also starred in drama series and movies. In October 2010, his contract with True Fantasia expired and he subsequently signed a 5-year contract with Grammy Gold.

== Discography ==
=== Albums ===
As leader

- 2006: Show Aof
- 2007: Rak Thon Rak Nan – featuring Aphaphorn Nakhonsawan, Pornchita "Benz" Na Songkhla, Pamela Bowden, and Luk Nok Supaporn

With UBC Academy Fantasia all-stars

- 2005: Season 2 contestants, Ray Khai Fun ('Dream for Sale')
- 2006: Seasons 1 & 2 contestants, Dream Team
- 2007: Seasons 1–3 contestants, AF The Musical: Ngern Ngern Ngern
- 2009: With Nim from True AF 5, Su Kho Sa Mo Sorn
- 2010: Rue Doo Hang Kwan Rak (True Fantasia and Sure Entertainment)

Grammy Gold

- Pen Kon Raek Tee Ter Kid Tueng Rue Plao (30 June 2011)

=== Collaborations ===
- 2010 – Kun Chai Tid Ru Kun Noo Tid Din (with Earnkwan Warunya)

=== Singles ===
- With AF winners seasons 1–6, "Khad Kwam Aob Aun Yang Rang"
- With AF winners seasons 1–6, "Roy Yim Peun Nam Ta", from the album The Winners

== Filmography ==
Drama series

- Kling Wai Kon Pho Sorn Wai – Episode: "Boundless Friendship" (Channel 7)
- Puen Rak Nak La Fun (Channel 7)
- Tam Roy Poh (Modern Nine TV)
- Khun Noo Chan Ta Na (Channel 3)
- Sa Pai Chao Sua (Channel 3)
- Koo Rak Chak Sok (True Hayha)
- Saphan Sang Dao (Thai PBS)

Movies

- The One (Phranakorn Film, 23 August 2007)
- Konbuy the Movie (Sahamongkol Film, 27 December 2007)

Theatre

- Playing the role of "Tee", AF The Musical: Ngern Ngern Ngern (31 March – 8 April 2007, 12 rounds)
- Playing the role of "Koro", AF The Musical: Jojosan – adapted from Puccini's Madame Butterfly (9–31 August 2008, 19 rounds)

Advertisements

- Close-Up toothpaste (2006):
  - "When Aof was Challenged"
  - "When Aof's Teeth were White and Clean"
  - "10 baht Close-Up"
- Honda Click (2006): "Honda Click"
- TrueMove (2007): "TrueMove Chaiyo Sim"
- Brand ambassador for Muang Thai Life Assurance (2009)
- Krungsri debit card promoting Academy Fantasia, "The Winner" (2010)

== Bibliography ==
- Aof Supanat (Thunder Publishing, October 2006)

== Awards ==
- Winner of UBC Academy Fantasia season 2 (2005)
- Khom Chad Leuk Awards: Popular New Artist 2006, Kom Chad Leuk newspaper
- Sudsapda Awards Young & Smart Vote: Popular Artist 2006, Sudsapda magazine
