= Savitree Suttichanond =

Thai singer (born 1985)

Savitree Suttichanond สาวิตรี สุทธิชานนท์
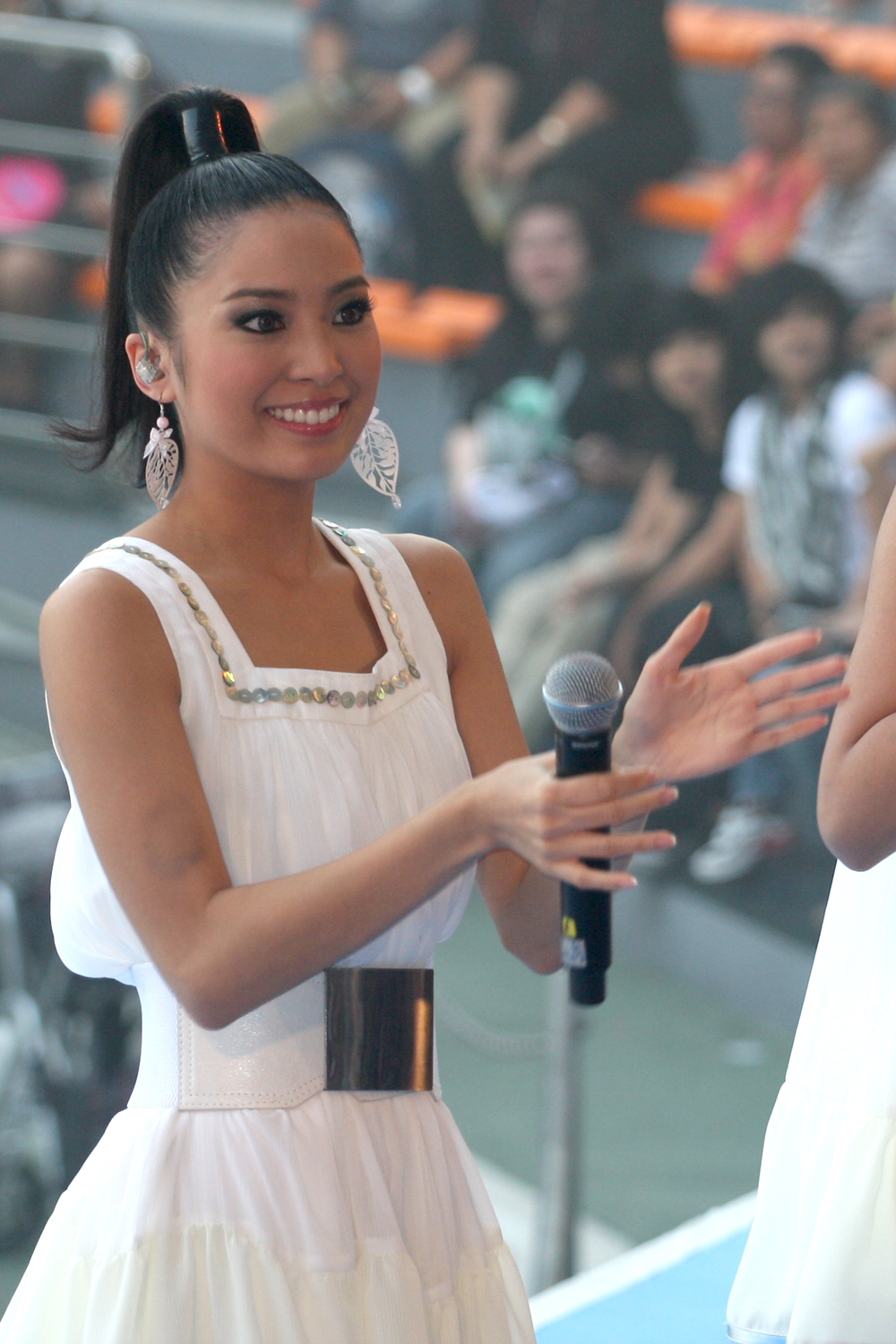

Background information
- Also known as: Beau (โบว์); Beau V5; Beau Savitree (โบว์ สาวิตรี)
- Born: สาวิตรี สุทธิชานนท์ June 8, 1985 (age 41); Nonthaburi, Thailand
- Genres: Pop, R&B
- Occupation: Singer
- Years active: 2008–present
- Label: True Fantasia

Savitree Suttichanond (Thai: สาวิตรี สุทธิชานนท์; RTGS: Sawittri Sutthichanon; born June 8, 1985) is a Thai singer best known for competing in the 5th season of reality talent show True Visions's Academy Fantasia. She is now completing her role as a contestant on the show, which includes performing in a nationwide concert tour in late August to September 2008.

== Biography ==
Savitree Suttichanond, also known as Beau or Beau Savitree, was born in Thailand but has lived in the United States for the past decade. After graduating with a double major in Political Science and International Studies from the University of California, Irvine, she was offered a job at a prestigious law firm, where she worked for less than one year before moving back to Thailand to pursue her dream of becoming a pop star. While attending the University of California, Irvine, Savitree was a member of the Delta Delta Delta sorority, was a SPOP staffer, and actively participated in the university's Thai Club. Savitree was also active in ITSA (Intercollegiate Thai Student Association) in helping organize events put on by Thai clubs from other universities such as University of California, Riverside, California State Polytechnic University, Pomona, the University of California, Los Angeles, the University of Southern California, California State University, Long Beach, the University of California, San Diego, and California State University, Fullerton. She always performed in the ITSA Karaoke and Singing contests with stellar performances.

=== Academy Fantasia ===
Savitree competed in the fifth season of Academy Fantasia and was eliminated during the ninth week of the show. She made it into the top 16 from the clip (online) auditions, and survived the first elimination ranking first place in votes for the first week. She was the only contestant remaining from the clip auditions for the last five weeks that she was on the show.

Savitree's elimination came as a shock to audiences everywhere. Many believe that it was unfair for her to have been eliminated, because the voting for the ninth week included a surprise vote in which a contestant who had been voted off in the previous six weeks could have the chance to return. This skewed the votes incredibly, making it so that the seven contestants remaining on the show (including Savitree) together had only 35% of the vote, and the votes of the seven contestants ended up being within 0.42% of each other. With such little difference between their votes, even a small number of votes could make a huge difference, so voting for week nine was more dependent on luck and chance rather than talent and popularity.

Songs Savitree Sang in the Concerts for Academy Fantasia Season 5

Week 1 Theme: Your Songs, My Songs (Audition #1) – Fáa Sòng Chăn Maa (Thai: ฟ้าส่งฉันมา)

Week 2 Theme: Your Requests (Audition #2) – Rák Chăn Rîak Wâa Ter (Thai: รักฉันเรียกว่าเธอ) – with Prink V1 and Good V10, Glàp Maa Hăa Pêuan (Thai: กลับมาหาเพื่อน) – with Prink V1, Micky V6, Nim V9, Good V10, and Green V14 Week 3 Theme: Not My Style – Bpèrt Jai Săao Dtàe (Thai: เปิดใจสาวแต)

Week 4 Theme: Dance Group – Rŏr (Thai: เหรอ) – with Prink V1, Tab V3, and Wahn V15, Tôh-óie (Thai: โธ่เอ๊ย) – with Prink V1, Tab V3, and Wahn V15, Yàa Mong Dtrong Nán (Thai: อย่ามองตรงนั้น) – with Prink V1, Micky V6, Good V10, and Green V14

Week 5 Theme: Thai Contemporary Duets – Jòop Yóie Jan (Thai: จูบเย้ยจันทร์) – with Kee V14, Dtâi Rôm Má-Lóo-Lee (Thai: ใต้ร่มมลุลี) – with Kee V14

Week 6 Theme: Songs of Asanee-Wasan – Yin-Yom (Thai: ยินยอม), (Medley) Yin-Dee Mâi Mee Bpan-Hăa, Bang On-Ao-Dtàe Non, Ter Bpan Jai, Râm-Rai, Póp Gan Krêung Taang, Hâi Ter, Kâao Yen, Bang-Ern Dtìt Din – with all other contestants

Week 7 Theme: Indy Songs – Yàa Kâo Jai Chăn Pìd (Thai: อย่าเข้าใจฉันผิด), (Medley) Rák Rák, Aa-Mâa Dòo, ûan, Pâa Chét Nâa, Daao – with Micky V6, Good V10, and Green V14

Week 8 Theme: Thai Country – Jà Kŏr Gôr Rêep Kŏr (Thai: จะขอก็รีบขอ), Gohn Jòok Sĭng Dtoh (Thai: โกนจุกสิงห์โต) – with all other contestants

Week 9 Theme: My Favorite Song – Nung Wii Na Tee Kor Cha Pai (Thai: หนึ่งวินาทีก็ช้าไป)

Week 11 Theme: The Battle – (Surprise) : I Have Nothing – with Prink V1

== See also ==
- Academy Fantasia
