= Nat Thewphaingam =

Thai singer (born 1989)

Nat Thewphaingam ณัฏฐ์ ทิวไผ่งาม
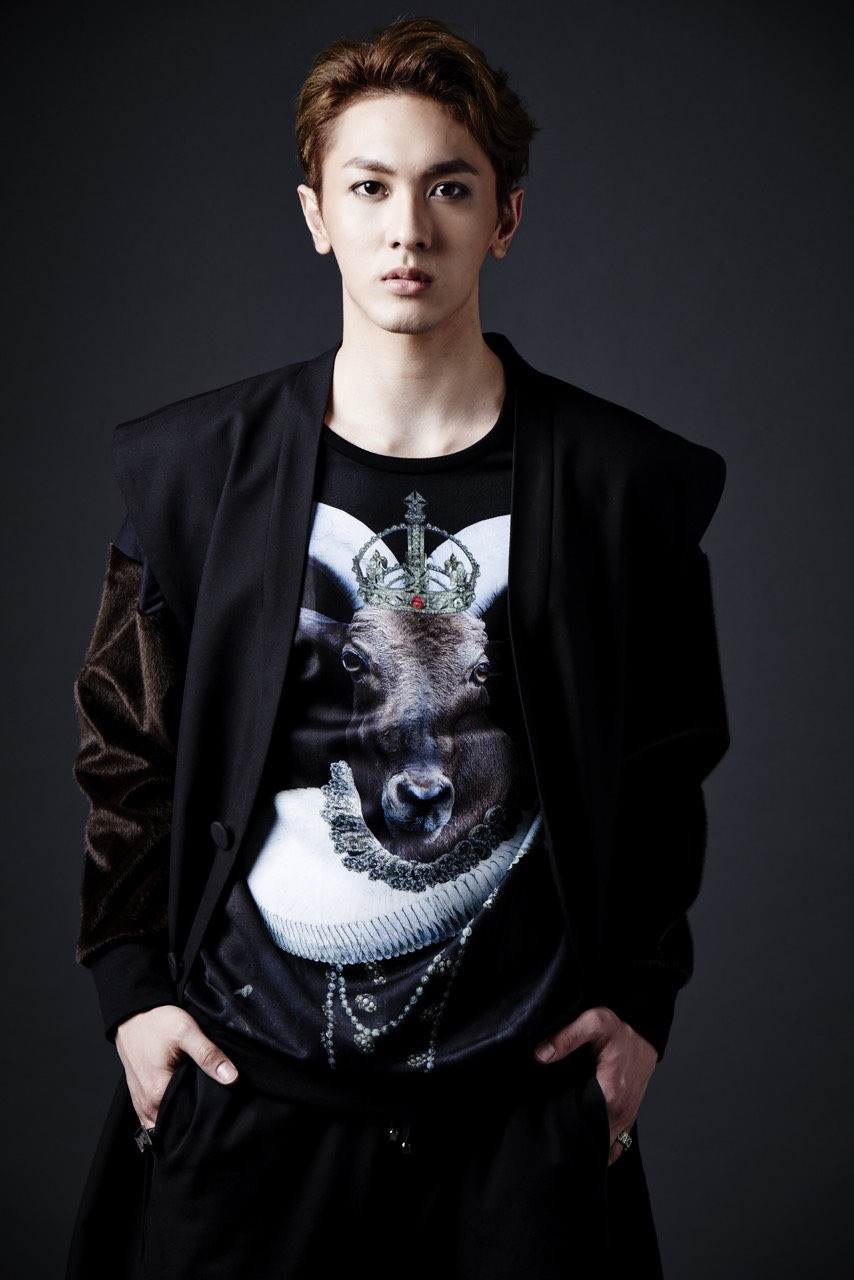
- Pic Natthew by Fanclub

Background information
- Also known as: Natthew; นัททิว; Nat; 나튜
- Born: 5 June 1989 (age 37); Bangkok, Thailand
- Genres: Thai pop
- Occupations: Singer; actor
- Years active: 2008–present
- Labels: True Fantasia (2008–2016); Independent actor (present)
- Website: Natthew's Twitter; Natthew's instagram

Nat Thewphaingam (Thai: ณัฏฐ์ ทิวไผ่งาม, RTGS: Nat Thio-phai-ngam; 5 June 1989), better known by his stage name Natthew (Thai: นัททิว, Korean: 나튜), is a Thai singer, actor, presenter and the winner of the 5th Season of reality talent show TrueVisions' Academy Fantasia in Thailand.

== Biography ==
Nat Thewphaigam (stage name Natthew), was born on 5 June 1989, the second child of three siblings. He graduated with a bachelor's degree in management from the Faculty of Business Administration, Kasetsart University. His hobbies include playing the saxophone, drawing Cartoons, collecting and building Gundam robots. Natthew was the winner of Thailand's Academy Fantasia Show Season 5 in 2008. He acted on the BBTV Channel 7 during 2009 – 2014. Presently, he is the only artist part of True Fantasia Group and CJ E&M.

He cited Nichkhun of 2PM as an inspiration for expanding his career into South Korea. CJ Entertainment, (a subsidiary of CJ Group in South Korea), hired Natthew as singer and artist in the joint Korean-Thai "New Natthew Project".

Natthew is also involved in a number of charity works, most notably singing for the Japan Charity Live Concert, South Charity Live Concert, and Clean Up Day Together We Can BIG CLEAN UP DAY TOGETHER WE CAN.

== Debut in Korea ==
Natthew, the winner of Thailand's Academy Fantasia, an audition program similar to Mnet's Superstar K, traveled to Korea as part of the Korean-Thai joint project, "New Natthew Project". The joint venture by CJ E&M and Thailand's CP Group managed his Korean debut, which included vocal and dance training.

Natthew said about his new ventures, "I′m aiming to be recognized by Korean fans as an artist instead of remaining a foreign singer who has thought to visit Korea. I hope to become an artist that helps the exchange of culture between Thailand and Korea."

Natthew created a fan club which he dubbed "Universe," because he sees his fans like the stars that are always in the sky, even when invisible during the daytime. When Natthew faces difficulties, just as the stars are always present, his fans are always there to look to for encouragement.

=== New Natthew Project ===
As part of the "New Natthew Project", Natthew's first Korean MV single "She's Bad" and stage debut on M! Countdown premiered on 15 November 2012. "She's Bad" is an electronic track composed by C-Luv. Featured in the music video for "She's Bad" are Yong Jun-hyung from Beast, and Brave Girls' Seo-a. Natthew's logo was designed by South Korean actress Jaekyung from the girl group Rainbow. Natthew also performed in the Mnet Asian Music Awards (MAMA) in Hong Kong on 30 November 2012.

In April 2013, Natthew released "오 제발 (Oh Please)", a single from "Nine: Time Travelling Nine Times (나인: 아홉 번의 시간 여행) Part 3", a Korean drama that broadcast on the TVN network 11 March – 14 May 2013.

=== Projects in 2014 ===
Since 9 June 2014, Natthew has worked in South Korea as a CJ E&M artist. In July 2014, he performed as a guest singer for the song "All of Me" during a mini-concert by Korean bands Black Muso and Nine Gray at Evans Lounge in Hongdae.

On 12 November, he pre-released a cover of Roy Kim's "Don't Know How". On 13 November, Natthew released a new title song entitled "Love will be OK (할게)" that featured Son Ho-young of G.o.d. and Park Bo-ram. His new single was released with a show performance on the comeback stage at Mnet M Countdown. He performed in several media outlets including The Show (SBS MTV), Show Champion (MBC), Music Bank (KBS) and Simply K-Pop (Arirang TV).

Natthew is featured in the single "The Only One" by South Korean girl group Tiny-G, released by Rerun Music on 25 November 2012.

== Korean series ==
Natthew appeared in episodes 4, 7, and 8 of the series as Nawin Thammarat, a character who meets other regular characters while busking in Hongdae.

== Career ==
=== Singer ===
Natthew's debut single "Roo Mai" (รู้ไหม) was released in 2008. In 2009 he joined the band 123 SOUL and produced two other singles, "Sak Khrang (สักครั้ง) and Kha-yap (ขยับ). In 2010, Natthew performed as a solo artist again in The Winner Project. He released two singles, "Muea Chan Dai Bok Rak Thoe Pai Laeo" (เมื่อฉันได้บอกรักเธอไปแล้ว) and "Phro Thoe" (เพราะเธอ). After that, he released the Thai version of the OST, "As Ever/Still" from the "You're Beautiful" the Korean TV series.

Natthew's first album, "Natthew The Passion", was released in April 2011 which included five new songs: "Tor Hai Ther Ja Luem" (ต่อให้เธอจะลืม), "Noy Gwa Rak Mak Gwa Chob" (น้อยกว่ารักมากกว่าชอบ), "Change", "Sa thern jai" (สะเทือนใจ) and, "Love Happens", along with three previous works. The single of the year 2011 was "Kon Samkan" (คนสำคัญ).

After Natthew returned to Thailand, he released the single "Ying Fang Ying Jeb" (ยิ่งฟังยิ่งเจ็บ) or "Oh Please" in the Thai version and invited Thai actress Davika Horne to play appear in a music video. In November 2013, Natthew released a cover single "No Regret To Love You" (ไม่เสียใจที่ได้รักเธอ) for a special event to thank his "Universe" fans who had supported him since he won TrueVisions's Academy Fantasia in 2008. He featured a video from "Natthew Fan Meeting in BKK 2013".

In December 2014, Natthew came back to Thailand for to promote his new single "Love will be OK" in both Korean and Thai versions, (Rak Tae Kae Ma Cha – รักแท้แค่มาช้า). In 2015, his new ballad single "Silent Sorry (ขอโทษในใจ)" was released. The lyrics of the single were based on his personal relationships.

=== Actor ===
While working in MUSIC FILE, he was also involved in his first-ever Thai TV production, "Wai Puan Kuan La Fun" (วัยป่วนก๊วนล่าฝัน). Earlier in 2011, both of his Thai series "Nuea Ma Nut" (เหนือมนุษย์) and "Sane Bangkok" (เสน่ห์บางกอก) were broadcast. The series "Thida-Wanon 3" (ธิดาวานร 3) was his fourth series. His latest series, "Sue-Saming" (เสือสมิง), aired December 2012, where he played Pha-U and Shwe-Bo (พะอู/ชะเวโบ). In August 2014, Natthew ended his contract as an actor with BBTV Channel 7.

Natthew has played Schlomo Metzenbaum in the Thai version of the musical Fame. In 2012, Natthew played the role of cheerful playboy Pravich Rajpallop (ประวิช ราชพัลลภ) in Prissana the Musical.

=== Others ===
Natthew has worked in various areas of showbusiness including music, modeling, and being a brand ambassador. His most notable work to date was his role in the royal musical "Our Land", directed by Euthana Mukdasanit. The film was in celebration of the 83rd birthday of His Majesty the King Bhumibol Adulyadej.

Natthew also represented Thailand in a celebration for the 8th anniversary of Korean broadcasting KBS World by taking part in the "Let's Go! Dream Team" featuring Asian Stars vs. Korean Stars. In 2012, KBS of South Korea chose Natthew to join in the Let's Go! Dream Team with Asian Stars against Korean Stars Season 2 again.

== Personal life ==
He's been dating with the actor Nathadej Pititranun (Jeff) since 2025.

== Discography ==
=== Studio albums ===
- 2011: Natthew The Passion

=== Singles ===
| Year | Title | Album |
|---|---|---|
| 2008 | "Roo Mai (รู้ไหม)" – (Premier: 30 August 2008 /Premier MV: 9 October 2008) | Me, My dream and My Producer |
| 2009 | "Sak Khrang (สักครั้ง)" – mv | None |
| 2009 | " Kha-yap (ขยับ)" – mv | None |
| 2010 | " Muea Chan Dai Bok Rak Thoe Pai Laeo (เมื่อฉันได้บอกรักเธอไปแล้ว)" – (Premier: 14 June 2010 /Premier MV: 19 July 2010) | The Winner Project |
| 2010 | " Phro Thoe (เพราะเธอ)" – (Premier: 1 October 2010 /Premier MV: 8 November 2010) | The Winner Project |
| 2010 | " AS EVER/STILL (Thai version)" | OST. You're Beautiful (TV series) |
| 2011 | " TOR HAI THER JA LUEM (ต่อให้เธอจะลืม)" – (Premier: 16 February 2011 /Premier MV: 4 March 2011) | Natthew The Passion |
| 2011 | " Noy Gwa Rak Mak Gwa Chob' (น้อยกว่ารักมากกว่าชอบ)" – (Premier MV : 13 June 2011 ) | Natthew The Passion |
| 2011 | " Change" | Natthew The Passion |
| 2011 | " Sa thern jai (สะเทือนใจ)" | Natthew The Passion |
| 2011 | Love Happens | Natthew The Passion |
| 2011 | " Kon Samkan (คนสำคัญ)" – (Premier: 16 August 2011 /Premier MV: 13 September 2011) | None |
| 2012 | " She's Bad" – (Premier MV : 15 November 2012) | New Natthew Project |
| 2012 | Because Of You | – |
| 2013 | "오 제발 (Oh Please)" – (Premier: 1 April 2013) | OST.Nine: Time Travelling Nine Times Part 3 |
| 2013 | " Ying Fang Ying Jeb (ยิ่งฟังยิ่งเจ็บ) or Oh Please Ver.Thai" – (Premier: 11 April 2013 /Premier MV: 30 May 2013) | None |
| 2013 | "No Regret To Love You (ไม่เสียใจที่ได้รักเธอ)" – (Premier: 26 October 2013 /Premier MV: 5 November 2013) | None |
| 2014 | "Don't Know How (Remake Roy Kim's song)" – (Premier: 12 November 2014) | None |
| 2014 | 잘할게 (Love will be OK)" – (Premier: 13 November 2014) | None |
| 2014 | Rak Tae Kae Ma Cha (รักแท้แค่มาช้า)/ Love will be OK Ver.Thai – (Premier: 1 December 2014 /Premier MV: 19 January 2014) | None |
| 2015 | " Khothot Nai Chai (ขอโทษในใจ)/ (Silent Sorry)" – (Premier: 23 March 2015 /Premier MV: 31 March 2015) | None |

== Filmography ==
=== Television drama ===
| Year | Title | Role | channel |
|---|---|---|---|
| 2009 | phuean si longhon (เพื่อนซี้ล่องหน) | guest star | Ch 3 Thailand |
| 2009 | chamloei kamthep (จำเลยกามเทพ) | guest star | Ch 3 Thailand |
| 2010 | Wai Puan Kuan La Fun (วัยป่วนก๊วนล่าฝัน) | Mai (ไม้) | Ch 7 Thailand |
| 2011 | Nuea Ma Nut (เหนือมนุษย์) | Heman (เหมันต์) | Ch 7 Thailand |
| 2011 | Sane Bangkok (เสน่ห์บางกอก) | Phueng (ผึ่ง) | Ch 7 Thailand |
| 2011 | Thida-Wanon 3 (ธิดาวานร 3) | Choeng Doi (เชิงดอย) | Ch 7 Thailand |
| 2012 | wiwa chut chut . ha he (วิวาห์ ... ฮาเฮ) | guest star | Ch 7 Thailand |
| 2012 | Sue-Saming (เสือสมิง) | Pha-U/Shwe-Bo | Ch 7 Thailand |
| 2013 | Monstar (몬스타) | Nawin Thammarat | TVN South Korea |
| 2015 | rab sab my boss EP. Big fight (รับแซ่บmyboss ตอน ศึกนี้ใหญ่หลวงนัก) | New | True4U Thailand |
| 2016 | Rak Raek Khong Chan Kap Khadi Philuek Phi Lan Khong Chaobao (รักแรกของฉันกับคดีพิลึกพิลั่นของเจ้าบ่าว) | GUN | True4U Thailand |
| 2016 | Thi Da Pha Sin (ธิดาผ้าซิ่น) | Su ra nart | PPTV Thailand |
| 2016 | Lon the series EP. lon son hua (หลอนเดอะซีรีส์ ตอน หลอนซ่อนหัว ) | Met | 9 Mcot Thailand |
| 2016 | We were born in the 9th reign of the series. (เราเกิดในรัชกาลที่๙ เดอะซีรีส์) | Invited actor | One 31 Thailand |
| 2016 | Club Friday the series 8 EP. 'True love or just deep connection' (รักแท้หรือแค่ผูกพัน) | Jim | GMM25 Thailand |
| 2017 | Miti sa-yong chuea pen mai chuea tai EP. phi phlak (มิติสยอง เชื่อเป็น ... ไม่เชื่อตาย ตอน ผีผลัก ) | Art | GMM25 Thailand |
| 2018 | Bangkok na-rue mit (บางกอกนฤมิต) | Sa-ha chat | One 31 Thailand |
| 2018 | Rai Saneha ( ไร้เสน่หา ) | Dr.Thaya | GMM 25 Thailand |
| 2018 | Saneha stories ( เสน่หาสตอรี่) | Seri | Ais play |
| 2019 | You Who Came from the Stars; or My Love from the Star; Thai Ver. ( ลิขิตรักข้ามดวงดาว ) | Athit (Yoo Seok : Korean ver.) | Ch 3 Thailand |
| 2019 | THE MASSENGER (คิวปิดกามเทพผิดคิว) | wait for a conclusion | PPTV Thailand |
| 2019 | Luk Krung (ลูกกรุง) | Chalong | One 31 Thailand |
| 2019 | Tok Kradai Huachai Phloi Chon (ตกกระไดหัวใจพลอยโจน) | Chen Tham | GMM 25 Thailand |

=== Musical theatre ===
| Year | Title | Role | Show Date | Venue | producer | Note |
|---|---|---|---|---|---|---|
| 2011 | Fame the Musical | Schlomo Metzenbaum | 9-11, 16–18,23–25 September (12 round) | M Theatre (New Pechburi Rd.) | DREAMBOX | |
| 2012 | Prisana the musical | prawit rat phan lop | 16–18,23–25 March 2012 (10 round) & restage 18–20,25–27 May 2012 ( 8 round) | M Theatre (New Pechburi Rd.) | DREAMBOX | |
| 2015 | Roy-duriyang-the-musical | Mike | 20–25 สิงหาคม (10 round) | Thailand Cultural Centre, Main Hall, Bangkok, Thailand | index creative village | |
| 2016 | Butterfly lovers the musical | Liang san po | 29 September – 16 October (15 round) | M Theatre (New Pechburi Rd.) | NBC & The Musicals Society of Bangko | On 13 October, King Bhumibol Adulyadej died.The show was canceled from 13 to 16 October. Actually, there were only 10 round |
| 2017 | In dream suntaraphon | Chettha | 17 June – 23 July (10 round) | M Theatre (New Pechburi Rd.) | JSL Global Media | |
| 2017 | See-pan-din-the musical 2017 | Aun | 11 November – 9 December 7.30 pm 10 December 1.30 am. (11 round) | Muangthai Rachadalai Theatre, Bangkok, Thailand | Exact & Scenario | Double cast Saranyu Winaipanit |
| 2018 | In dream suntaraphon Restage | Chettha | 10 March – 1 April (6 round) | M Theatre (New Pechburi Rd.) | JSL Global Media | |
| 2018 | Lod-Line-Mangkron-The Epic Musical at Lhong 1919 | Chan Chai | 16–25 November (7 round) | LHONG 1919, Bangkok, Thailand | Exact & Scenario | |

== Live Concert ==
=== Concert participation ===
- 2008: The Journey of Love Concert
- 2009: AF Bachelor Dream Concert
- 2009: The Greatest of the kings, the greetings of the land
- 2010: Krungsi Present the 1st 3D Concert – Victory of the Winners
- 2011: KRUNGSRI AF Comedy Show Must Go On
- 2012: Concert For You Kon Samkan
- 2012: The Gentlemen On Stage
- 2013: The Serenade of My Mine, My Universe
- 2013: AF5 The Infinity of Dreams Concert
- 2013: Natthew Fan Meeting in BKK 2013
- 2014: The Precious Moment with My Universe Concert
- 2015: AF Reunion V Fun มันส์ เฟิร์ม
- 2016: Eight to Eternity The Eternal Love Concert
- 2018: A Decade of Love The Concert

== Music programs ==
Natthew performed his 2 singles "She's bad" in 2012 and "Love will be ok" in 2014 on Korean stages.

| Year | Song | Music Show |
|---|---|---|
| 2012 | She's Bad | Mnet M! Countdown (2012.11.15) |
| 2014 | Love will be ok | Mnet M!Countdown (2014.11.13) |
| 2014 | Love will be ok | SBS MTV The Show (2014.11.18) |
| 2014 | Love will be ok | MBC Music Show Champion (2014.11.19) |
| 2014 | Love will be ok | KBS World Music Bank (2014.11.21) |
| 2014 | Love will be ok | SBS MTV The Show (2014.11.25) |
| 2014 | Love will be ok | MBC Music Show Champion (2014.11.26) |
| 2014 | Love will be ok | Arirang TV Simply Kpop (2014.12.05) |

== Awards ==
| Years | Awards |
|---|---|
| 2008 | The winner of Academy Fantasia season 5 |
| 2009 | Best Male Artist from Kazz magazine award |
| 2010 | GreetZ Macho from Virgin Greetz Awards |
| 2012 | Great Gratitude to Mother Annual Award on Mother's Day 2012, National Council On Social Welfare Of Thailand Under Royal Patronage. |
| 2012 | Best New Asian Artist Thailand from 14th Mnet Asian Music Awards 2012 |
| 2013 | Most want-to-be boyfriend from JPOP Asia Music Awards 2012 |
| 2013 | 2nd place of best single (k-pop) 2012 from JPOP Asia Music Awards 2012 |
| 2014 | Favorite Solo (k-pop) 2014 from JPOP Asia Music Awards 2014 |
| 2014 | Favorite Choreography (k-pop) 2014 from JPOP Asia Music Awards 2014 |
| 2014 | Sexiest Male (k-pop) 2014 from JPOP Asia Music Awards 2014 |
| 2014 | Most Want-to-be Boyfriend (k-pop) 2014 from JPOP Asia Music Awards 2014 |
| 2015 | Favorite Singer from Kazz Magazine Awards |
| 2015 | Honorary Award The 14th Kasetsart University |
| 2016 | Thai good role model Award |
| 2017 | Good role model of outstanding performer Award |
| 2017 | Winner of the Year @ SING YOUR FACE OFF Season3 |
| 2018 | Outstanding filial piety Artist from Siam Ka-ne-suan award 2018 |

== See also ==
- Academy Fantasia
