= Academy Fantasia =

Reality show held in Thailand

- Also known as: True Academy Fantasia, True AF, AF
- Created by: Auttapon Na-Bangchang; Pantapol Prasarnrajkit (season 13); Krisda Witthayakajndet (season 13)
- Presented by: Setha Sirachaya (Season 1 - Season 12); Sanya Kunakorn (Season 13 - present)
- Country of origin: Thailand
- Original language: Thai
- No. of seasons: 13
- No. of episodes: 152

Production
- Running time: Reality: 24 hours Concert: 120 - 180 minutes

Original release
- Network: TrueVisions iTV (season 2); Modernine TV (seasons 3-10); True4U (seasons 11-12)
- Release: June 21, 2004 – September 19, 2015
- Release: June 7, 2026 – present

Academy Fantasia (or True Academy Fantasia, formerly UBC Academy Fantasia) is a reality show held in Thailand.

Began to air in June 2004, it is a 24-hour reality show based on singing contest, judged through popular votes. The show is most recognized as the first Thai reality show in the format of 24-hour live broadcast, where the audiences can watch and follow life activities of the selected contestants. It is also one of two most popular reality show in mid-2000s to mid-2010s, along with The Star. A number of winners and runners-up from the contest have continued to become mainstream singers and/or actors, most notably including Pongsak Rattanapong (Aof), Patcha A-nekayuwat, Thanakrit Panichwit (Wan), Pissanu Nimsaku (Boy), Kietkamol Lata (Tui), Mintita Wattanakul (Mint), Nalin Hohler (Zara), Nat Sakdathron, Nat Thewphaingram (Natthew), Assadaporn Siriwatthanakul (Green), Nipaporn Thitithanakarn (Zani), Annop Thongborisut (Por), Benjamin Joseph Varney (Ben), Thanasit Jaturaput (Ton), Nontanun Anchuleepradit (Kacha), Sattaphong Piengpor (Tao), and Nisachol Sewthaisong (Nest).

Academy Fantasia has originally terminated its broadcast season with season 12 in 2015. However, in August 2025, it was announced that the show will return for its 13th season, scheduled to premiere on June 7, 2026.

== Overview ==
Created by cable TV provider TrueVisions, formerly known as United Broadcasting Corporation (UBC), Academy Fantasia is a franchise of La Academia, a popular reality TV show from Mexico. The contestants are selected through nationwide auditions, as well as through online audition clips. The live auditions take place in major cities in every part of Thailand to search for those who dream about becoming superstars. Four judges will eliminate thousands of people down to top 100 then last twelve or more finalists into the Academy House for study.

The contestants live in the same house with hundreds of hidden cameras. Audiences can watch them 24 hours live on TV and online. Each week the contestants are assigned individual songs and sometimes group songs to perform on stage every Saturday until the last week of the show. The contestants attend voice class, dance class, and acting class to practice the songs that they perform.

The audiences can vote for their favorite contestants through cell phones and land phones. The show usually airs 24 hours on True Reality Channel and the concerts will be broadcast live on True Inside Channel and True Music Channel under True Visions network, while on national television, the weekly concerts will be broadcast on ModernNine TV (public channel 9) (seasons 3-10), and later on True 4U (seasons 11-12), every Saturday night.

After each performance the commentators will evaluate the performance. At the end of the concert, the contestant(s) who received the lowest percentage of audience votes will have to leave the show, unless there is a special rules or "surprise" occurs, such as the Immunity Doll.

The winners of the first five seasons were all male and was the first female in the season 6, while as of 2026, there are nine male winners and four female winners. The 12 finalists from the first twelve seasons will automatically receive record deals with True Fantasia record label, while the 12 finalists from season 13 onwards will receive record deals with Ennead record label. From seasons 1-9, after the end of each season, there is a nationwide concert tour starring the top 12 finalists.

== Seasons ==
Season	Premiere date	The Winner	Runner-up	Finalists	Contestants in order of elimination	Number of Contestants	Number of Concerts
AF1	June 21, 2004	Vit (V2)	Jeen (V1)	Aof (V6), Z-Nam (V9), Namtarn (V7), & K (V4)	Joomjim (V5), Por (V10), Nan (V3), Noon (V12), Mam (V11), & Top (V8)	12	9
AF2	July 18, 2005	Aof (V4)	Pat (V6)	Boy (V8), Pas (V9), & Preaw (V2)	Joe (V12), Loogtarn (V1), Kookkai (V7), Wan (V3), My (V11), Mew (V5), & Ao (V10)	12	12
AF3	July 3, 2006	Tui (V12)	Ta (V1)	Boy (V8), Mint (V5), & Zara (V4)	Koh (V9), Dong (V7), Tune (V6), Apple & Cherry (V3), Bruna (V11), Pett (V2), & Louktarn (V10)	12 + 1	10
AF4	June 18, 2007	Nat (V1)	Tol (V9)	Papang (V3), Music (V8), Lookpong (V17), & Pong (V19)	Cat (V11), Tee (V12), Eingeing (V6), Puifai (V18), Jack (V2), & Joe (V16); Bomb (V5), Eiaw (V7), Man (V13), Dew (V15), Ae (V4), Namfon (V10), Anntie (V14), Dear (V20)	20	13
AF5	May 12, 2008	Natthew (V13)	Ron (V12)	Pump (V8), Good (V10), & Kee (V14)	Green (V16), Micky (V6), Beau (V5), Tab (V3), Prink (V1), Wahn (V15), & Nim (V9); Beer (V2), Benz (V4), Nan (V7), Dear (V11)	16	12
AF6	June 28, 2009	Zani (V6)	Ann (V10)	Tee† (V5), & Mac (V8)	Koonjae-Sal (V3), Nooknick (V9), Newty (V4), Aof (V2), Ich (V1), Itch (V12), Tabby (V11), & Krit (V7)	12	12
AF7	June 27, 2010	Por (V12)	Ton (V13)	Boss (V10), New (V4), Namkhang (V6) & Grape (V2)	Pum (V7), Ben (V3), Natty (V5), Paprae (V9), Green (V8), & Meen (V1); Mark (V11), 87 other contestants who were eliminated at the final audition round	12 (13, 100)	12
AF8	June 26, 2011	Ton (V9)	Praew (V15)	Kacha (V3), Frame (V21), Tao (V23) & James (V10)	Joy (V24), Praewa (V2), Lynn (V7), Tide (V1), Ann (V12) & Dew (V22); Yuki (V4), Potay (V6), Weiwei (V16), Aon (V20), Pik (V5), Earng (V14), Beer (V18), Team (V19), Poysian (V8), Tum (V11), Waew (V13), Friendship (V17)	24	12
AF9	June 3, 2012	Ice (V8)	Zo (V1)	Bright (V5), Nest (V7) & Kat (V4)	K (V6), Sunny (V11), Earth (V10), Kong (V2), Opol (V12), Baimonh (V3) & Bombay (V9); Sony, Dew, Baitong, Pla, Tung, Earth, Pamm, None, Tewich, Fluke, Nook, Mind	24 (12 V)	15
AF10	June 23, 2013	Tungbeer (V20)	Tayme (V6)	Tuey (V21), Beam (V15), Belle (V24), CoNan (V22), Mook (V4), Nan (V11), Hongyok (V23), Hernfah (V14), Tong (V8) & Nene (V18)	Tung (V13), Taengthai (V10), Fluke (V3), Taengmo (V2), Ten (V1), Benz (V9), Ton (V16), Aee (V7), Prim (V19), Ryu (V17), Mangpor (V12) & Lisa (V5)	24	12
AF11	July 20, 2014	Aim (V12)	Mac (V6)	Poom (V2), Nam (V11) & Q (V10)	Pond (V4), Jukkajun (V3), Poon (V8), May (V5), Mook (V1), Muayli (V9) & Way (V7)	12	11
AF12	June 28, 2015	Max (V12)	Benz(guy) (V9)	Mariew (V7) & Boat (V10)	Praew (V1), Benz(girl) (V4), Focus (V2), Joker (V3), Ploysai (V5), Jaoh (V11), May (V6) & Joon (V8)	12	12
AF 2026	June 7, 2026	Jayjay (V1)	Yuri (V5)	Ohm (V10) & Beem (V6)	Namo (V11), Music (V3), Fogus (V7), Jackie (V12), Pang (V4), San (V8), Phone (V2) & Ginggam (V9)	12	10

Male
Female

=== Season 1 (2004) ===
21 June - 21 August 2004 (9 Weeks)

- Week 1 theme: Trainers' Choices
- Week 2 theme: Trainers' Choices
- Week 3 theme: Trainers' Choices
- Week 4 theme: Trainers' Choices
- Week 5 theme: Duets
- Week 6 theme: Easy Listening
- Week 7 theme: International Soundtracks
- Week 8 theme: Rock n' Roll
- Week 9 theme: Contestant's Favourites (Finale)

Number	Contestant	Number	Contestant
V1	Jeen	V7	Namtarn
V2	Vit	V8	Top
V3	Nan	V9	Z-Nam
V4	K	V10	Por
V5	Joomjim	V11	Mam
V6	Aof	V12	Noon

==== Season 1: Elimination chart ====
Season 1
Female	Male	Top 12	Top 6	Runner-Up	Winner

Bottom	Eliminated	None-Elim

Stage:		Finals								Grand Finale
Week:		1	2	3	4	5	6	7	8	9
Place	Contestant	Result								
1	Vit							Btm		Winner
2	Jeen							saved		Runner-Up
3	Aof		Btm							Finalist
4	Z-nam		Btm			None Elim^{1}			Btm	Finalist
5	Namtarn	Btm		Btm	Btm					Finalist
6	K	None Elim			Btm		Btm		Btm	Finalist
7	Joomjim					Btm	Btm	Btm	Elim	
8	Por							Elim		
9	Nan			Btm		Btm	Elim			
10	Noon	Btm			Elim					
11	Mam			Elim						
12	Top		Elim							

^{1}None elimination week due to a failure of system supported the votes.

=== Season 2 (2005) ===
18 July - 8 October 2005 (12 Weeks)

- Week 1 theme: Songs from Audition Round
- Week 2 theme: 80's
- Week 3 theme: Duets
- Week 4 theme: #1 Hits
- Week 5 theme: Rock n' Roll
- Week 6 theme: Voting Back
- Week 7 theme: World Musics
- Week 8 theme: Songs of "The Soontaraporn"
- Week 9 theme: Dance & Remixes
- Week 10 theme: Thai Local Musics
- Week 11 theme: Movie Hits Soundtracks
- Week 12 theme: Contestant's Favourites (Finale)

Number	Contestant	Number	Contestant
V1	Loogtarn	V7	Kookkai
V2	Preaw	V8	Boy
V3	Wan	V9	Pas
V4	Aof	V10	Ao
V5	Mew	V11	My
V6	Patcha	V12	Joe

==== Season 2: Elimination chart ====
Season 2
Female	Male	Top 12	Top 5	Runner-Up	Winner

Bottom	Eliminated	Returned

Stage:		Finals											Grand Finale
Week:		1	2	3	4	5	6	7	8	9	10	11	12
Place	Contestant	Result											
1	Aof							Btm					Winner
2	Patcha		Btm		Btm								Runner-Up
3	Boy	Btm		Elim			Return^{1}		Btm		Btm		3rd Place
4	Pas	Btm									Btm	Btm	4th Place
5	Preaw			Btm		Btm		Btm				Btm	5th Place
6	Joe								Btm	Btm		Elim	
7	Loogtarn		Btm		Elim		Return^{1}			Btm	Elim		
8	Kookkai	Btm								Elim			
9	Wan			Btm		Btm			Elim				
10	My				Btm	Elim	Return^{1}	Elim					
11	Mew		Elim										
12	Ao	Elim											

^{1}Contestants were voted back and returned to competition once again. The ranking would be reset, but the rewards still were the same.

=== Season 3 (2006) ===
3 July - 9 September 2006 (10 Weeks)

- Week 1 theme: His Majesty The King's Songs
- Week 2 theme: Duets
- Week 3 theme: Songs of Contestant's Idols
- Week 4 theme: #1 Hits
- Week 5 theme: Animals Songs
- Week 6 theme: Songs for Mother
- Week 7 theme: Dance n' Hip
- Week 8 theme: Thai Country
- Week 9 theme: Hits Soundtracks
- Week 10 theme: Contestant's Favourites (Finale)

Number	Contestant	Number	Contestant
V1	Ta	V7	Dong
V2	Pett	V8	Boy
V3	Apple & Cherry	V9	Koh
V4	Zara	V10	Louktarn
V5	Mint	V11	Bruna
V6	Tune	V12	Tui

==== Season 3: Elimination chart ====
Season 3
Female	Male	Top 12	Top 5	Runner-Up	Winner

Bottom	Eliminated	None-Elim

Stage:		Finals									Grand Finale
Week:		1	2	3	4	5	6	7	8	9	10
Place	Contestant	Result									
1	Tui						1st^{1}				Winner
2	Ta			Btm		Btm	Top3			Btm	Runner-Up
3	Boy		Btm		Btm						3rd Place
4	Mint		Btm			Btm	Top3	Btm			4th Place
5	Zara	Btm							Btm	Btm	5th Place
6	Koh							Btm	Btm	Elim	
7	Dong		Btm						Elim		
8	Tune							Elim			
9	Apple & Cherry	Btm			Btm	Elim					
10	Bruna	None Elim		Btm	Elim						
11	Pett			Elim							
12	Louktarn		Elim								

^{1}Contestant had the most popular vote on the special week and get the special prize, a trip to Hong Kong with his mother for one week.

=== Season 4 (2007) ===
18 March - 15 October 2007 (12 Weeks & 1 Extra Week)

- Week 1 theme: Audition Songs
- Week 2 theme: Best of Me
- Week 3 theme: Thai Contemporary
- Week 4 theme: Boy Band & Girl Group
- Week 5 theme: Thai Country
- Week 6 theme: Cover Hits
- Week 7 theme: Superstars Superhits
- Week 8 theme: Tele Songs
- Week 9 theme: Cheer
- Week 10 theme: Karaoke (Surprised)
- Week 11 theme: Dance
- Week 12 theme: Contestant's Favourites (Finale)
- Week 13 theme: Contestant's The Best of AF4 & His Majesty The King's Songs (The Extra Week)

Number	Contestant	Number	Contestant
V1	Nat	V11	Cat
V2	Jack	V12	Tee
V3	Papang	V13	Man
V4	Ae	V14	Antie
V5	Bomb	V15	Dew
V6	Eingeing	V16	Joe
V7	Eaw	V17	Lookpong
V8	Music	V18	Puifai
V9	Tol	V19	Pong
V10	Namfon	V20	Dear

==== Season 4: Elimination chart ====
Season 4
Female	Male	Top 20	Top 12	Top 6	Runner-Up	Winner

Bottom	Eliminated	Returned

Stage:		Semi-finals		Finals									Grand Finale	Extra Week
Week:		1	2	3	4	5	6	7	8	9	10	11	12	13
Place	Contestant	Result												
1	Nat								Btm		1st^{1}		Winner	
2	Tol							Btm		Btm	Top2		Runner-Up	
3	Papang								Btm				3rd Place	
4	Music	Btm			Btm			Btm		Btm	Top3		4th Place	
5	Lookpong	Btm				Btm						Btm	5th Place	
6	Pong			Elim							Return^{2}	Btm	6th Place	Top3
7	Cat	Btm		Btm	Elim						Return^{2}	Elim	Return	
8	Tee									Elim			Return	Top2
9	Eingeing	Btm			Btm	Btm			Elim				Return	
10	Puifai							Elim					Return	
11	Jack						Elim						Return	1st^{3}
12	Joe			Btm		Elim							Return	
13-16	Bomb		Elim										Return	
13-16	Eaw		Elim										Return	
13-16	Man		Elim										Return	
13-16	Dew		Elim										Return	
17-20	Ae	Elim											Return	
17-20	Namfon	Elim											Return	
17-20	Antie	Elim											Return	
17-20	Dear	Elim											Return	

^{1}Contestant have the most popular vote of the week and can choose two contestants (within top12) back to the competition once again.
^{2}Contestants were selected by the most popular vote contestant of the week to come back into the competition once again, their ranking would be reset.
^{3}Contestant have the most popular vote of the week and receive a special prize, trip to any country in the world.

In the 4th season, AF had 20 contestants go into the Academy house. However, this was still considered the Semi-finals, since there are normally only 12 final contestants in each season. Thus, by the end of the week, 8 of the contestants were supposed to be eliminated, leaving with only 12 people as the real finalists. After the 1st week's performance, the voting results showed that only 3 girls survived to the next round if they really eliminated 8 people. However, this could not happen according to the show's "bible" because in every season, there needs to be 5-7 men & 5-7 women (roughly equal number of men and women among the 12 contestants). Therefore, this week, instead of eliminating the bottom 8, they eliminated only the bottom 4, who were all female. It was also announced that in the following week, 4 male contestants would have to be eliminated, while the female contestants would be safe. In the 2nd week, the bottom 4 male contestants were eliminated by the end of the show.

=== Season 5 (2008) ===
12 May - 2 August 2008 (12 Weeks)

- Week 1 Theme: My Songs & Your Songs
- Week 2 Theme: My Request
- Week 3 Theme: Not My Style
- Week 4 Theme: Dance Group
- Week 5 Theme: Thai Contemporary Duets
- Week 6 Theme: Songs of "Asanee-Wasan"
- Week 7 Theme: Indy Music
- Week 8 Theme: Thai Country
- Week 9 Theme: My Favorite Song
- Week 10 Theme: Korean Songs
- Week 11 Theme: The Battle
- Week 12 Theme: Contestant's Favourites (Finale)

Number	Contestant	Number	Contestant
V1	Prink	V9	Nim
V2	Beer^{1}	V10	Good
V3	Tab	V11	Dear
V4	Benz	V12	Ron
V5	Beau^{1}	V13	Natthew
V6	Micky	V14	Kee
V7	Nan^{1}	V15	Wahn^{1}
V8	Pump	V16	Green

^{1}Contestants from online auditions.

==== Season 5: Elimination chart ====
Season 5
Female	Male	Top 16	Top 12	Top 5	Runner-Up	Winner

Bottom	Eliminated	Back	Returned

Stage:		Semi-finals		Finals									Grand Finale
Week:		1	2	3	4	5	6	7	8	9	10	11	12
Place	Contestant	Result											
1	Nat						Elim		Back^{4}	Return^{5}			Winner
2	Ron								Btm			Btm2	Runner-Up
3	Pump				Btm				Btm				3rd Place
4	Good							Top3					4th Place
5	Kee		Btm							Btm			5th Place
6	Green						Btm					Elim	
7	Micky					Btm	Btm	2nd^{2}	None Elim^{3}	Btm	Elim		
8	Beau^{1}			Btm				Top3		Elim			
9	Tab		Btm		Btm	Btm		Elim	Back^{4}				
10	Prink	Btm		Btm		Elim			Back^{4}				
11	Wahn^{1}	Btm	Btm		Elim				Back^{4}				
12	Nim			Elim					Back^{4}				
13-14	Beer^{1}	Btm	Elim										
13-14	Benz	Btm	Elim										
15-16	Nan^{1}	Elim											
15-16	Dear	Elim											

^{1}Contestants from online auditions.
^{2}Contestant was the 2nd place popular vote of the week and received the Immunity Idol which could help her save herself from an elimination.
^{3}None eliminated because a contestant decided to use the Immunity Idol to save herself from elimination.
^{4}Contestants were given a chance to return into the Academy house just one week. There would be only 1 contestant can return to the competition again.
^{5}Contestant got the most popular vote in the voting back week, and can return into the competition once again.

In the 5th season, 16 contestants were admitted to the Academy house, so in the first week 4 contestants were supposed to be eliminated (one male and one female from the online auditions, and one male and one female from live auditions.) At the actual concert, though, the audience and the contestants were surprised when only 2 female contestants were eliminated (one from online auditions and one from live auditions), so 2 male contestants (one from the clip auditions and one from the live auditions) would be eliminated in week 2.

=== Season 6 (2009) ===
28 June - 19 September 2009 (12 Weeks)

- Week 1 Theme: My Style
- Week 2 Theme: Party & Radio Hits
- Week 3 Theme: Tributed to King of Pop "Michael Jackson"
- Week 4 Theme: Hard Rock
- Week 5 Theme: Dance
- Week 6 Theme: Show Power
- Week 7 Theme: Mother's Choice
- Week 8 Theme: The Battle
- Week 9 Theme: Featuring with Our Friend
- Week 10 Theme: Thai Country
- Week 11 Theme: The Musical
- Week 12 Theme: My Dream with My Songs (Finale)

Number	Contestant	Number	Contestant
V1	Ich	V7	Krit
V2	Aof	V8	Mac
V3	Koonjae-Sal	V9	Nooknick
V4	Newty	V10	Ann
V5	Tee†	V11	Tabby
V6	Zani	V12	Itch

==== Season 6: Elimination chart ====
Season 6
Female	Male	Top 12	Top 4	Runner-Up	Winner

Bottom	Bottom-Saved	Eliminated	None-Elim

Stage:		Finals											Grand Finale
Week:		1	2	3	4	5	6	7	8	9	10	11	12
Place	Contestant	Result											
1	Zani			Saved			Btm	Best	Saved			Saved	Winner
2	Ann										Saved		Runner-Up
3	Tee†							Top 3		Saved		Btm	Finalist
4	Mac			Btm				Top 3			Btm		Finalist
5	Koonjae-Sal				Btm					Btm	Btm	Elim	
6	Nooknick	Btm	Btm		Saved		Saved	Btm	Btm	Elim			
7	Newty		Saved			Saved		Saved	Elim				
8	Aof					Btm	Btm	Elim					
9	Ich			Btm		Elim							
10	Itch				Elim								
11	Tabby	Saved	Elim										
12	Krit	Elim											

=== Season 7 (2010) ===
27 June - 18 September 2010 (12 Weeks)

- Week 1 Theme: Top 100 Semi-final Audition
- Week 2 Theme: Rock
- Week 3 Theme: Hot Debut (During years contestants were born, 1988–1995)
- Week 4 Theme: Korean Songs
- Week 5 Theme: Single Show (Contestant's Choice)
- Week 6 Theme: Songs for Mother
- Week 7 Theme: Music Festival (International Hits)
- Week 8 Theme: Tag Teams (Duet & Battle Songs)
- Week 9 Theme: Songs of Thongchai McIntyre (Musical Part I)
- Week 10 Theme: Thai Contemporary & Country (Musical Part II)
- Week 11 Theme: Variety Dance
- Week 12 Theme: Grand Finale

Number	Contestant	Number	Contestant
V1	Meen	V7	Pum
V2	Grape	V8	Green
V3	Ben	V9	Paprae
V4	New	V10	Boss
V5	Natty	V12	Por
V6	Namkhang	V13	Ton^{1}

^{1}Ton (V13) replaced Mark (V11), who retired the show at the end of concert week 3.

==== Season 7: Elimination chart ====
Season 7
Female	Male	Top 25	Withdrew	Replaced	Top 12	Top 6	Runner-Up	Winner

Bottom	Bottom-Saved	Eliminated	None-Elim

Stage:		Semi-finals	Finals										Grand Finale
Week:		1	2	3	4	5	6	7	8	9	10	11	12
Place	Contestant	Result											
1	Por	Top 12						Top 5				Btm	Winner
2	Ton	Top 25		RP				Top 5					Runner-Up
3	Boss	Top 12			Btm					Btm			Finalist
4	New	Top 12		Btm				Top 5					Finalist
5	Namkhang	Top 12				Btm		saved		Btm	Btm		Finalist
6	Grape	Top 12			Btm	Btm		Top 5	Btm			Btm	Finalist
7	Pum	Top 12						Btm			Btm	Elim	
8	Ben	Top 12									Elim		
9	Natty	Top 12			Saved			Btm	Btm	Elim			
10	Paprae	Top 12		Btm			Btm	Top 5	Elim				
11	Green	Top 12		Saved			Saved	Elim					
12	Meen	Top 12				Saved	Elim						
-	Mark	Top 12	Did Not Perform	WD									
Semi-finals	Bell	Top 25											
Semi-finals	Dew	Top 25											
Semi-finals	Frame	Top 25											
Semi-finals	Ink	Top 25											
Semi-finals	Jim	Top 25											
Semi-finals	Kacha	Top 25											
Semi-finals	Kho	Top 25											
Semi-finals	Loukked	Top 25											
Semi-finals	May	Top 25											
Semi-finals	Nick	Top 25											
Semi-finals	Noey	Top 25											
Semi-finals	Pam	Top 25											

=== Season 8 (2011) ===
26 June - 17 September 2011 (12 week)

- Week 1 Theme: Semi-final #1 - My Style
- Week 2 Theme: Semi-final #2 - Duo Song
- Week 3 Theme: Semi-final #3 - Thanks & Gives
- Week 4 Theme: Tata Young & Jirasak Parnpum
- Week 5 Theme: Hearthbroken
- Week 6 Theme: In Love
- Week 7 Theme: Variety Dance
- Week 8 Theme: Killer Song
- Week 9 Theme: The King's Songs, Thai Contemporary & Thai Country
- Week 10 Theme: Musical
- Week 11 Theme: Songs of 'Ohm Chatri' & 'Dee Nitipong'
- Week 12 Theme: Grand Final

Number	Contestant	Number	Contestant
V1	Tide	V13	Weaw
V2	Praewa	V14	Earng
V3	Kacha	V15	Praew
V4	Yuki	V16	Weiwei
V5	Pik	V17	Friendship
V6	Potay	V18	Beer
V7	Lynn	V19	Team
V8	Poyzian	V20	Aon
V9	Ton	V21	Frame
V10	James	V22	Dew
V11	Tum	V23	Tao
V12	Ann	V24	Joy

==== Season 8: Elimination chart ====
Season 8
Female	Male	Top 24	Top 12	Top 6	Runner-Up	Winner

Bottom	Eliminated	None-Elim

Stage;		Semi-finals			Finals								Grand Finale
Week:		1	2	3	4	5	6	7	8	9	10	11	12
Place	Contestant	Result											
1	Ton			Top 12						Btm	1st		Winner
2	Praew			Top 12									Runner-Up
3	Kacha			Top 12									Finalist
4	Frame			Top 12									Finalist
5	Tao		Btm	Top 12					Btm				Finalist
6	James			Top 12	Btm			Btm				Btm	Finalist
7	Joy	Btm	Btm	Top 12		Btm		None Elim	Btm	Btm		Elim	
8	Praewa			Top 12	Btm		Btm	Btm		Elim			
9	Lynn			Top 12			Btm		Elim				
10	Tide			Top 12		Btm	Elim						
11	Ann			Top 12		Elim							
12	Dew			Top 12	Elim								
13-16	Yuki			Elim									
13-16	Potay			Elim									
13-16	Weiwei			Elim									
13-16	Aon			Elim									
17-20	Pik		Elim										
17-20	Earng		Elim										
17-20	Beer		Elim										
17-20	Team	Btm	Elim										
21-24	Poyzian	Elim											
21-24	Tum	Elim											
21-24	Weaw	Elim											
21-24	Friendship	Elim											

=== Season 9 (2012) ===
2 June - 15 September 2012 (15 Weeks)

- Week 1 Theme: My Chosen Song #1
- Week 2 Theme: My Chosen Song #2
- Week 3 Theme: My Chosen Song #3
- Week 4 Theme: 12 Dream 12 Style
- Week 5 Theme: Re-stage: Friend's song
- Week 6 Theme: Thai's life
- Week 7 Theme: First Love
- Week 8 Theme: Killer Songs
- Week 9 Theme: The Battle: Senior's Song
- Week 10 Theme: Mothers' Generation Songs
- Week 11 Theme: Dance City
- Week 12 Theme: Duets
- Week 13 Theme: Musical
- Week 14 Theme: Settha Sirachaya
- Week 15 Theme: Grand Final

Number	Contestant	Number	Contestant
V1	Zo	V7	Nest
V2	Kong	V8	Ice
V3	Baimonh	V9	Bombay
V4	Kat	V10	Earth
V5	Bright	V11	Sunny
V6	K	V12	Opol

==== Season 9: Elimination chart ====
Female	Male	Top 24	Top 12	Winner

Safe	Bottom	Eliminated	Non-Eliminated

Stage;		Semi-finals			Finals											Grand Finale
Week:		1	2	3	4	5	6	7	8	9	10	11	12	13	14	15
Place	Contestant	Result														
1	Ice			Top 12											Saved	Winner
2	Zo	Btm		Top 12									Btm 3	Btm 3		Runner-Up
3	Bright			Top 12								Btm 3		Saved	Saved	Finalist
4	Nest		Btm	Top 12										Saved		Finalist
5	Kat			Top 12									Btm 3		Saved	Finalist
6	K			Top 12	Btm 3	Btm 3			Btm 3	Saved	Btm 2	Btm 2	Elim			
7	Sunny	Btm		Top 12			Btm 3	Btm 3		Btm 3	Btm 3	Elim				
8	Earth			Top 12		Btm 3	Btm 3	Btm 3	Btm 3	Btm 3	Elim					
9	Kong		Btm	Top 12				Saved	Elim							
10	Opol			Top 12	Btm 3		Elim									
11	Baimonh			Top 12		Elim										
12	Bombay			Top 12	Elim											
13-16	Pla			Elim												
13-16	Dew		Btm	Elim												
13-16	Baitong			Elim												
13-16	Sony		Btm	Elim												
17-20	None	Btm	Elim													
17-20	Pam	Btm	Elim													
17-20	Earth		Elim													
17-20	Tung		Elim													
21-24	Mind	Elim														
21-24	Nook	Elim														
21-24	Fluke	Elim														
21-24	Tawich	Elim														

=== Season 10 (2013) ===
24 June - 14 September 2013 (12 Weeks)

- Week 1 Theme: My Style
- Week 2 Theme: My Steps
- Week 3 Theme: My Scenes
- Week 4 Theme: My Minute
- Week 5 Theme: My Duet
- Week 6 Theme: My Weakness
- Week 7 Theme: My Buddy
- Week 8 Theme: My Beat
- Week 9 Theme: My Thai Thai
- Week 10 Theme: My Stage (AF10 The Musical)
- Week 11 Theme: My Voice My Music
- Week 12 Theme: My Dream

Number	Contestant	Number	Contestant
V1	Ten	V13	Thung
V2	Taengmo	V14	Hernfah
V3	Fluke	V15	Beam
V4	Mook	V16	Ton
V5	Lisa	V17	Ryu
V6	Tayme	V18	Nene
V7	Aee	V19	Prim
V8	Tong	V20	Tungbeer
V9	Benz	V21	Tuey
V10	Tangtai	V22	CoNan
V11	Nan	V23	Hongyok
V12	Mangpor	V24	Belle

==== Team ====
- Week 1-6

ทีม ฝันและใฝ่

- V1 Ten
- V3 Fluke
- V4 Mook
- V5 Lisa
- V7 Aee
- V9 Benz
- V10 Tangtai
- V12 Mangpor
- V13 Thung
- V15 Beam
- V22 CoNan
- V24 Belle

ทีม ฝากรัก

- V2 Taengmo
- V6 Tayme
- V8 Tong
- V11 Nan
- V14 Hernfah
- V16 Ton
- V17 Ryu
- V18 Nene
- V19 Prim
- V20 Tungbeer
- V21 Tuey
- V23 Hongyok
- Week 7

ทีม ฝันและใฝ่

- V1 Ten
- V3 Fluke
- V4 Mook
- V9 Benz
- V13 Thung
- V15 Beam
- V22 CoNan
- V24 Belle

ทีม ฝากรัก

- V2 Taengmo
- V6 Tayme
- V8 Tong
- V10 Tangtai
- V11 Nan
- V14 Hernfah
- V18 Nene
- V20 Tungbeer
- V21 Tuey
- V23 Hongyok
- Week 8-9

ทีม ฝันและใฝ่

- V3 Fluke
- V4 Mook
- V10 Tangtai
- V13 Thung
- V15 Beam
- V20 Tungbeer
- V22 CoNan
- V24 Belle

ทีม ฝากรัก

- V2 Taengmo
- V6 Tayme
- V8 Tong
- V11 Nan
- V14 Hernfah
- V18 Nene
- V21 Tuey
- V23 Hongyok

==== Season 10: Elimination chart ====
Season 10
Female	Male	Top 24	Top 12	Runner-Up	Winner

Bottom	Bottom-TeamWin	Eliminated	None-Elim

Stage:		Finals											Grand Finale
Week:		1	2	3	4	5	6	7	8	9	10	11	12
Place	Contestant	Result											
1	Tungbeer												Winner
2	Tayme												Runner-Up
3	Tuey					Btm-win				Btm			Finalist
4	Beam								Btm-win				Finalist
5	Belle								Btm-win				Finalist
6	CoNan												Finalist
7	Mook		Btm				Btm-win						Finalist
8	Nan						Btm		Btm				Finalist
9	Hongyok			Btm									Finalist
10	Hernfah				Btm		Btm	Btm-win		Btm			Finalist
11	Tong			Btm				Btm-win					Finalist
12	Nene								Btm			Btm	Finalist
13	Thung											Elim	
14	Tangtai			Btm-win	Btm-win			Btm-win	Btm-win		Elim		
15	Fluke			Btm-win	Btm-win	Btm	Btm-win			Elim			
16	Taengmo				Btm	Btm-win		Btm-win	Elim				
17	Ten					Btm		Elim					
18	Benz						Btm-win	Elim					
19	Ton					Btm-win	Elim						
20	Aee	Btm	Btm	Btm-win	Btm-win	Elim							
21	Prim				Elim								
22	Ryu			Elim									
23	Mangpor	Btm	Elim										
24	Lisa	Elim											

=== Season 11 (2014) ===
20 July - 4 October 2014 (11 Weeks)

- Week 1 Theme: My Style
- Week 2 Theme: Boy Band & Girl Group
- Week 3 Theme: Mother's Choice
- Week 4 Theme: Duets
- Week 5 Theme: Thai Country
- Week 6 Theme: Midterm
- Week 7 Theme: The Battle
- Week 8 Theme: Solo Dance
- Week 9 Theme: Musical
- Week 10 Theme: Producers Choices
- Week 11 Theme: Grand Final

Number	Contestant	Number	Contestant
V1	Mook	V7	Way
V2	Poom	V8	Poon
V3	Jukkajun	V9	Muayli
V4	Pond	V10	Q
V5	May	V11	Nam
V6	Mac	V12	Aim

==== Season 11: Elimination chart ====
Season 11
Female	Male	Top 12	Top 5	Runner-Up	Winner

Bottom	Bottom-Saved	Eliminated

Stage:		Finals										Grand Finale
Week:		1	2	3	4	5	6	7	8	9	10	11
Place	Contestant	Result										
1	Aim				Top							Winner
2	Mac	Btm			Top					Saved		Runner-Up
3	Poom				Saved					Saved		Finalist
4	Nam				Saved		Btm	Btm	Btm	Saved		Finalist
5	Q				Saved						Btm	Finalist
6	Pond	Btm			Saved	Btm			Btm		Elim	
7	Jukkajun			Btm	Saved		Btm	Btm	Elim			
8	Poon			Btm				Elim				
9	May				Saved	Btm	Elim					
10	Mook	Btm	Btm			Elim						
11	Muayli		Btm	Elim								
12	Way		Elim									

=== Season 12 (2015) ===
28 June - 19 September 2015 (12 Weeks)

- Week 1 Theme: Trainers Choices
- Week 2 Theme: Trainers Choices
- Week 3 Theme: Trainers Choices
- Week 4 Theme: Entertain & Emotional
- Week 5 Theme: Duets
- Week 6 Theme: Songs For Mom
- Week 7 Theme: The Battle
- Week 8 Theme: Thai Country & Thai Contemporary
- Week 9 Theme: Party Dance
- Week 10 Theme: Musical
- Week 11 Theme: Tribute Carabao
- Week 12 Theme: Grand Finale

Number	Contestant	Number	Contestant
V1	Preaw	V7	Mariew
V2	Focus	V8	Joon
V3	Joker	V9	Benz(guy)
V4	Benz(girl)	V10	Boat
V5	Ploysai	V11	Jaoh
V6	May	V12	Max

==== Season 12: Elimination chart ====
Season 12
Female	Male	Top 12	Top 4	Runner-Up	Winner

Bottom	Eliminated	None-Elim

Stage:		Finals											Grand Finale
Week:		1	2	3	4	5	6	7	8	9	10	11	12
Place	Contestant	Result											
1	Max												Winner
2	Benz(guy)		Saved								Btm		Runner-Up
3	Mariew		Btm						Btm		Btm		Finalist
4	Boat				Btm								Finalist
5	Praew			Btm				Btm		Btm		Elim	
6	Benz(girl)			Btm	Btm					Btm	Elim		
7	Focus								Btm	Elim			
8	Joker	Btm						Btm	Elim				
9	Ploysai	Btm						Elim					
10	Jaoh	Saved				Elim							
11	May		Btm		Elim						Back		
12	Joon			Elim									

=== Season 13 (2026) ===
7 June - 15 August 2026 (10 Weeks)

- Week 1 Theme: My Style
- Week 2 Theme: Producer's Week
- Week 3 Theme: Thai Identity
- Week 4 Theme: Duet
- Week 5 Theme: Super Band
- Week 6 Theme: EDM Party
- Week 7 Theme: Battle of the Ages
- Week 8 Theme: Musical
- Week 9 Theme: Gala Night
- Week 10 Theme: More Than Reality

Number	Contestant	Number	Contestant
V1	Jayjay	V7	Fogus
V2	Phone	V8	San
V3	Music	V9	Ginggam
V4	Pang	V10	Ohm
V5	Yuri	V11	Namo
V6	Beem	V12	Jackie

==== Season 13: Elimination chart ====
Season 13
Female	Male	Top 12	Top 4	Runner-Up	Winner

Bottom	Immune	Eliminated	None-Elim

Stage:		Finals									Grand Finale
Week:		1	2	3	4	5	6	7	8	9	10
Place	Contestant	Result									
1	Jayjay						Immune			Immune	Winner
2	Yuri				Immune			Immune			Runner-Up
3	Ohm		Btm				Btm		Immune	Immune	Finalist
4	Beem								Btm		Finalist
5	Namo							Immune		Elim	
6	Music						Btm	Immune	Elim		
7	Fogus	Btm		Btm				Elim			
8	Jackie		Immune		Btm	Immune	Elim	Back			
9	Pang	Immune	Btm	Immune	Btm	Elim					
10	San	Btm			Elim						
11	Phone	Btm		Elim							
12	Ginggam			Elim							
