= Am Fine =

Thai band

Am Fine แอมไฟน์
- Origin: Bangkok, Thailand
- Genres: Pop, rock
- Years active: 2005—2011
- Members: Nathathai Saengphech (Faii); Neti Suwanjinda (Ne); Phongsilp Komolthat (Jack); Pamorn Juthapan (Mon)

Am Fine is a music group from Thailand, which was founded 2005 in Bangkok. Their first single "Kard Kwam Aob Aun" (ขาดความอบอุ่น) and their first album Am Fine were released in the same year. In 2012, Nathathai "Faii", the lead singer, became a solo artist under the name Faii Am Fine while other band members left to work behind the scene. All their albums are released with RS label.

== Discography ==
=== Am Fine ===
Am Fine (2005)

1. Kard Kwam Aob Aun (ขาดความอบอุ่น)
2. Phuying Cainaai (ผู้หญิงใจง่าย)
3. He he!! (เฮ เฮ!!)
4. In Love
5. Thea mi phid (เธอไม่ผิด)
6. Namta yod sabthaai (น้ำตาหยดสุดท้าย)
7. Mai phid zi mai (ไม่ผิดใช่ไหม)
8. Ca ao yang ngai (จะเอายังไง)
9. Thea phu diyow (เธอผู้เดียว)
10. Fan phi thoe (ฝันไปเถอะ)
11. Kard Kwam Aob Aun Studio Version (ขาดความอบอุ่น Studio Version)
12. Phuying Cainaai Acoustic Version (ผู้หญิงใจง่าย)

Hi-fine (2006)

1. Ma rak thami ton nii (มารักทำไมตอนนี้)
2. Rak chan prechod khrai (รักฉันประชดใคร)
3. Tokhnum ra (ตกหลุมรัก)
4. Di mi pho (ดีไม่พอ)
5. Kai tha (ใกล้ตา)
6. Cong (จ้อง)
7. Kho khwam (ข้อความ)
8. Manchai ni rak mi manchai ni thoe (มั่นใจในรัก ไม่มั่นใจในเธอ)
9. Dek mi penha (เด็กมีปัญหา)
10. Am Fine

Am Fine Day (2007)

1. Mai nao mei mai chenai (ไม่เหงาไม่มาใช่ไหม)
2. Yum khao mala (ยืมเขามาลา)
3. Snuk nak ruenai (สนุกนักหรือไง)
4. Cai phak cai pong (ใจภักดิ์ ใจปอง)
5. Khwam cing cak pak khong thoe -

Doubt (2008)

1. Chan de mi phow rue thoe mei pho sak thi ฉันดีไม่พอหรือเธอไม่พอซักที
2. Fear Night/Klaw klangkhuen (Fear Night/กลัวกลางคืน)
3. Mei khouhu (ไม่เข้าหู)
4. Ma kon jep kon (มาก่อนเจ็บก่อน)
5. Khid thung thoe thang nata (คิดถึงเธอทั้งน้ำตา)

Little Room (2008)

1. Faen gao (แฟนเก่า)
2. Khwam rak kab rongthao (ความรักกับรองเท้า)
3. Trong nai khong hua chai thoe (ตรงไหนของหัวใจเธอ)
4. Swan thang (สวนทาง)
5. Yak hi ru wa rak thoe (อยากให้รู้ว่ารักเธอ)
6. Klaw chai (กลัวใจ)
7. Mi hoachai/Tae ri khwam rusuk (มีหัวใจ/แต่ไร้ความรู้สึก)
8. Toklong rao pen ai kan (ตกลงเราเป็นอะไรกัน)
9. Seying thi mi diyin (เสียงที่ไม่ได้ยิน)
10. Dwongtawan khong chai (ดวงตะวันของใจ)

Drama (2009)

1. Pelyin faen ngay kwa (เปลี่ยนแฟนง่ายกว่า)
2. Hami coe rhoe thei mimi (หาไม่เจอหรือเธอไม่มี)
3. Nokcai hrai sak khon (นอกใจใครสักคน)
4. Reim mai kab khai mi dai (เริ่มใหม่กับใครไม่ได้)
5. Khon don mai di khon di mi don (คนโดนไม่ดี คนดีไม่โดน)
6. Khwam ngeiyib thaen kha tob (ความเงียบแทนคำตอบ)
7. Thing tae pak (ทิ้งแต่ปาก)
8. Ceb laek ngao (เจ็บแลกเหงา)
9. Pen pheoun kab theo mi dai (เป็นเพื่อนกับเธอไม่ได้)
10. Rab wua yang deiyow (รับไว้อย่างเดียว)

My self (2011)

1. Cai mi khaeng hemoun pak (ใจไม่แข็งเหมือนปาก)
2. Khon mai swy phid samoe (คนไม่สวยผิดเสมอ)
3. Namta ca lai (น้ำตาจะไหล)

=== Faii Am Fine ===
Focus (2012)

1. Plyn fan lai hun (Michi khun lay cai) (เปลี่ยนแฟนหลายหน (ไม่ใช่คนหลายใจ) )
2. Khon Ti Laew Ko Pud Yang Nee (คนที่แล้วก็พูดแบบนี้)
3. Yud Pud Hai Ru Suek Dee (หยุดพูดให้รู้สึกดี) (OST ละคร น้องเมีย)
4. Jai Dee Dee (ใจดีดี) (OST ละคร กากับหงส์)
5. Fa Luem (ฟ้าลืม) (OST ละคร บ่วงบาป)

(also includes songs from earlier Am Fine albums)

Singles

1. Mai Yak Dai Fan Mai (ไม่อยากได้แฟนใหม่)
2. Mai Mee Thi Pai (ไม่มีที่ไป) (OST ละคร นางมาร)
3. Thi Yak Tham Ching Ching Rue (ที่อยากถามจริงจริงคือ)
4. Thab Pen Thab Tai (แทบเป็นแทบตาย) (OST ละคร ชิงรักหักสวาท)
5. Rak Ching Mee Mai (รักจริงมีไหม) (OST ละคร แม้เลือกเกิดได้)
6. Hai Chai Ro Ther (หายใจรอเธอ) (OST ละคร แหวนทองเหลือง)
7. Fai Luang (ไฟลวง) (OST ละคร ไฟลวง)
