= Pongsak Rattanapong =

Thai singer and actor (born 1985)

- ปองศักดิ์ รัตนพงษ์
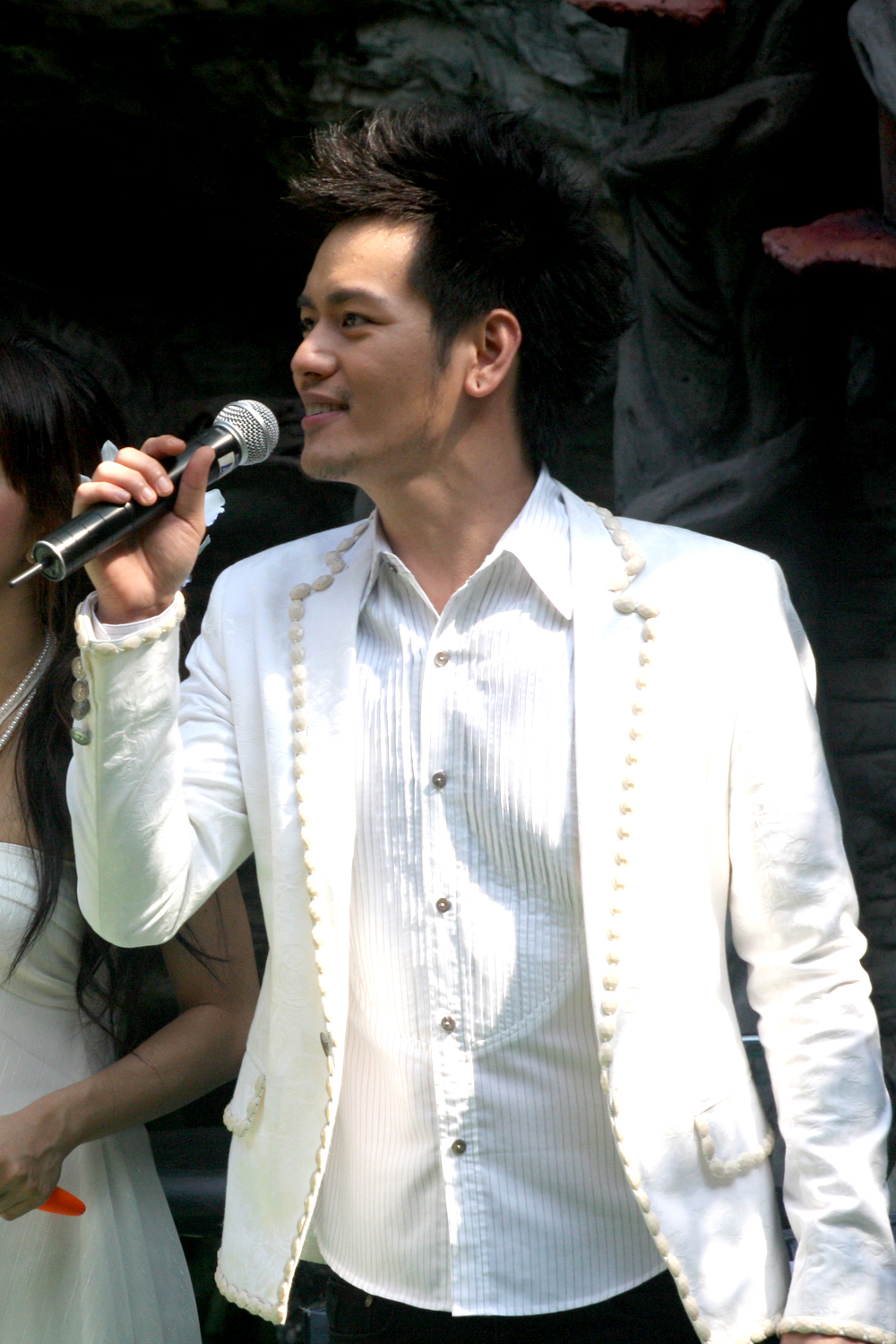
- Born: Pongsak Rattanapong; 22 March 1985 (age 41); Chiang Mai, Thailand
- Other name: Aof
- Occupations: Actor; singer; TV host
- Musical career
- Also known as: Aof Pongsak
- Genres: Pop; R&B; sentimental ballad; folk; Blues
- Instrument: Vocals
- Years active: 2004–present
- Label: GMM Grammy
- Website: Official website

Pongsak Rattanapong (Thai: ปองศักดิ์ รัตนพงษ์, RTGS: Pongsak Rattanaphong; born 22 March 1985), better known by his nickname Aof (อ๊อฟ), is a Thai singer and actor who gained popularity through the first season of the Thai reality show Academy Fantasia. He is known for his soft voice and sensitive songs.

In 2009, Aof debuted in his musical, Lom Haichai, the Musical (The Breath), based on the songbook of Boyd Kosiyabong.

== Personal life ==
Aof is openly gay. He came out in April 2013, after years of speculation.
