= Palmy =

Thai singer-songwriter (born 1981)

Palmy ปาล์มมี่
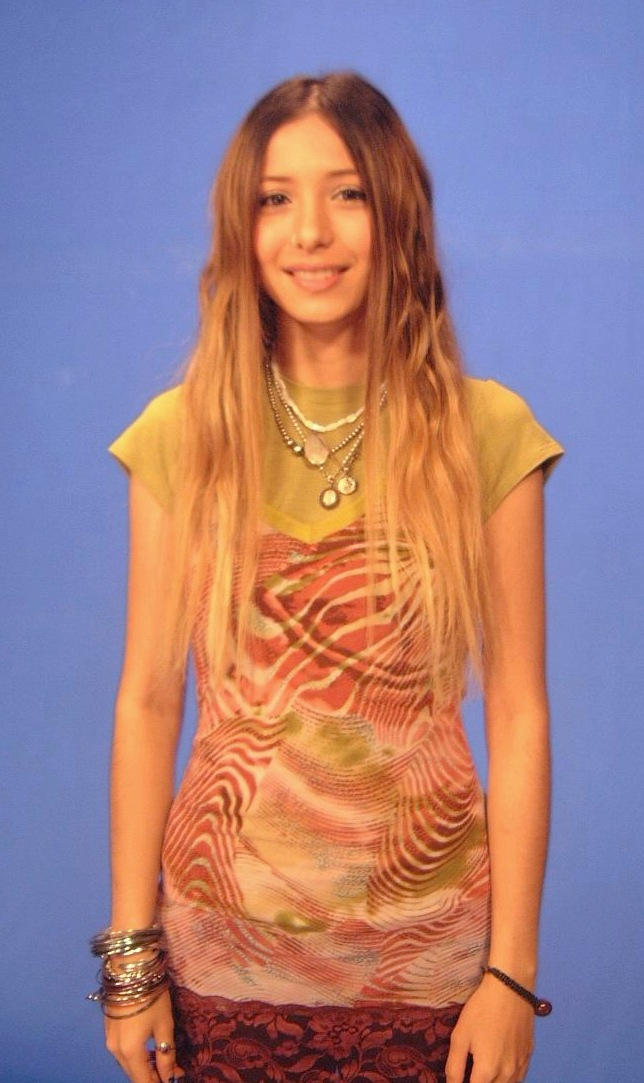
- Palmy in 2000

Background information
- Born: Eve Pancharoen (Thai: อีฟ ปานเจริญ); August 7, 1981 (age 45); Bangkok, Thailand
- Genres: Thai pop; R&B; pop rock
- Occupations: Singer-songwriter; actress
- Instrument: Vocals
- Years active: 2001–present
- Label: GMM Music (2000–present)

Signature
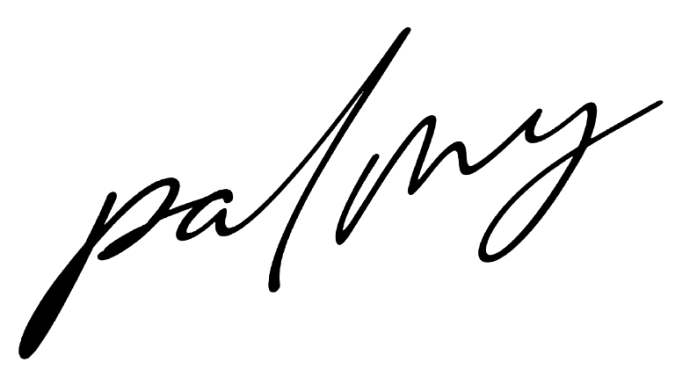

Eve Pancharoen (Thai: อีฟ ปานเจริญ; born August 7, 1981), known professionally as Palmy (Thai: ปาล์มมี่), is a Thai pop singer. Beginning with her self-titled solo debut: Palmy in 2001, she has recorded several albums, including concert DVDs under the GMM Grammy label. She has performed live with T-Bone and appeared as a guest vocalist at other concerts and music festivals in Japan, South Korea, Singapore, Thailand, and the United Kingdom.

== Biography ==
=== Early years ===
Pancharoen was born in Bangkok on August 7, 1981, to a Thai mother and a Belgian father. At the age of thirteen, she moved to Sydney, Australia, where she attended Holy Cross College and studied music and art. During this period, she took vocal lessons at the Australian Institute of Music to develop her vocal and musical skills.

=== Music career ===
Palmy returned to Thailand around 1999 or 2000 to become a professional singer and signed a contract with GMM Grammy in 2000. In 2001, she released her debut album Palmy, with the single "Yak Rong Dang Dang." She held her first concert organized by GMM Grammy on April 7, 2002.

Since her debut as a singer, Palmy has released three solo albums and performed internationally on several occasions, including in Japan, Korea, Singapore, England, and Australia. She is known to perform and make public appearances barefoot, even hosting a concert around the theme of being barefoot ("Palmy Barefoot Acoustic Concert").

In 2019, her single titled "Khewng" (Lost) was featured in the Thai Netflix TV series The Stranded.

== Awards ==
Year	Award	Category	Work / Recipient	Result
2001	Channel V Thailand Music Video Awards	Most Popular New Artist	Palmy	Won
2002	Elle Style Awards, Elle Thailand	Female Singer	Palmy	Won
2002	Golden Ganesha Award	Best Female Pop Singer	Palmy	Won
2002	Channel V Thailand Music Video Awards	Best Thai Female Music Video	"Yak Rong Dang Dang"	Won
2003	National Youth Bureau Awards	Best Female Singer for National Youth	Palmy	Won
2003	Sea-Son Awards	Best Female Singer	Palmy	Won
2003	Kom Chad Luek Awards	Best Female Artist	Palmy	Won
2003	Channel [V] Thailand Music Video Awards	Best Thai Female Music Video	"Pood Mai Tem Pak"	Won
2004	Fat Awards	Female Artist of the Year	Stay	Won
2004	MGA Hall of Fame Awards	Top Selling Newcomer	Palmy	Won
2006	Virgin Hitz Awards	Popular Vote Female Artist	Palmy	Won
2007	Fat Awards	Female Artist of the Year	Beautiful Ride	Won
2011	Teen Choice Awards (Thailand)	Music Choice Female Artist	Palmy	Won
2011	Intensive Watch Award	No. 1 Music Chart Monthly Award (August)	"Overthinking" (คิดมาก)	Won
2012	You2Play Awards	Favorite Female Artist	Palmy	Won
2012	The Guitar Magazine Awards	Best Female Artist	Palmy	Won
2012	Seed Awards (Seed 97.5 FM)	Best Female Artist of the Year	Palmy	Won
2012	Siamdara Stars Awards	Best Female Artist	Palmy	Won
2019	Thailand Social Awards	Best Entertainment on Social Media (Female Artist)	Palmy	Won
2019	The Guitar Magazine Awards	Best Song Writer of the Year	Palmy	Won
2019	The Guitar Magazine Awards	Single Hit of the Year	"Son-Klin"	Won
2019	The Guitar Magazine Awards	Best Female of the Year	Palmy	Won

== Discography ==
=== Palmy ===
Her self-titled debut album, Palmy, was released on December 21, 2001.

The album contains ten tracks:

1. Yak Rong Dang Dang (อยากร้องดังดัง) ("I Want To Shout Out Loud")
2. Yoo Tor Dai Reu Plow (อยู่ต่อได้หรือเปล่า) ("Can You Stay")
3. Paed Mong Chao Wan Ang Kan (แปดโมงเช้าวันอังคาร) ("8:00 AM On Tuesday")
4. Kao Leum (เขาลืม) ("He Forgot")
5. Tob Tuan (ทบทวน) ("Reconsider")
6. Klua (กลัว) ("Afraid")
7. Peun Tee Suan Tua (พื้นที่ส่วนตัว) ("Personal Space")
8. Saen Sa Bai (แสนสบาย) ("Totally Relaxed")
9. Fah Song Chan Ma (ฟ้าส่งฉันมา) ("Heaven Sent Me")
10. Fan Dee Kae Mai Kee Keun (ฟัดดีไม่กี่คืน) ("Sweet Dreams For A Few Nights")

=== Stay ===
Her second album, Stay, was released on July 29, 2003. Chawin "Jug/Jugg" Chitsomboon is credited for guest writing and playing acoustic guitar on the titular song, "Stay."

The album contains ten tracks:

1. Tam pen mai tak ("Pretending You Don't Notice")
2. Pood mai tem pak ("Speaking Without A Full Mouth")
3. Trid sa dee ("Theory")
4. Chuay ma rub chan tee ("Come Pick Me Up")
5. Ched ta na ("Intention")
6. Kra dod keun fah ("Jump Into The Sky")
7. Prung née art mai mee fhan ("I Might Not Be Here Tomorrow")
8. Kor pai kon diaw ("I Want To Go Alone")
9. Ni tan ("Story")
10. Stay

=== Beautiful Ride ===
Her third album was released on June 6, 2006. This was her first album with her new production team and spent nearly two years producing the album.

The album contains ten tracks:

1. Tick Tock
2. Ooh!
3. Kwam cheb puad ("Pain")
4. Rong hai ngai ngai kab ruang derm derm ("Crying Easily Over The Same Things")
5. Mai mee kam cham kad kwam ("Without Definition")
6. Chak kan trong née (We're separating right here")
7. Kun chae tee hai pai ("The Missing Key")
8. Ploy ("Release")
9. Mai mee krai chok rai ta lod ("No One Is Unlucky Forever")
10. Neung na tee ("Just One Minute")

=== Palmy the Acoustic Album ===
This acoustic album released on July 24, 2007 is a collaboration between Palmy and T-Bone, a Thai reggae band.

The album contains twelve tracks:

1. Tick Tock
2. Ooh!
3. Stay
4. Kwam cheb puad ("Pain")
5. Kun chae tee hai pai ("The Missing Key")
6. Klua ("Afraid")
7. Tob tuan ("Reconsider")
8. Pood mai tem pak ("Speaking Without A Full Mouth")
9. Prung née art mai mee chan ("I Might Not Be Here Tomorrow")
10. Rong hai ngai ngai kab ruang derm derm ("Crying Easily Over The Same Things")
11. Yark rong dang dang ("I Want To Shout Out Loud")
12. Yoo tor dai reu plow ("Can You Stay")

=== Palmy 5 ===
Palmy 5, her fourth album, was released on December 9, 2011.

The album contains ten tracks:

1. Rockstar syndrome
2. Ka Ka Ka ("Kaw, Kaw, Kaw")
3. Kid mark ("Overthinking")
4. Shy boy
5. Crush feat. Erlend Øye
6. Cry Cry Cry
7. Toong see dum ("Black Field")
8. Nalika reun kao ("Old Clock")
9. Butterfly
10. Private sky (demo)

=== New Single (2018–2020) ===
The album contains ten tracks:

1. Nuad ("Massage")
2. Mae-Giew ("Mother Harvest")
3. Son-Klin ("Tuberose")
4. Kid-Tueng ("Missing You")
5. Doung-Jai ("Heart")
6. Khewng ("Lost")
7. Kwanxey Kwanma ("Oh Spirit Come Back To Me")
8. Ribbon Love Color Black
9. "Sanitjai" ("At Ease") OST.Rakray ("Bad Love")
10. "Fear Of Flying" by Illslick featuring Palmy

=== หลุมอากาศ (Air Pocket) ===
In June 2026, Palmy released "Air Pocket," a single that discussed her experience being hospitalized.

== Concerts ==
Year	Concert	Date(s)	Venue	Location	Notes
2002	Palmy's Life Concert	7 April 2002	Thammasat University Auditorium, Tha Prachan	Bangkok, Thailand	Debut concert; tickets sold out within one hour after reaching number one on multiple music charts.
2004	Stay with Me		Impact Arena	Pak Kret, Nonthaburi, Thailand	Featured songs primarily from the album Stay.
2004	Palmy in the Candle Light Concert	May 2004	Vachirabenjatas Park (Rot Fai Park)	Bangkok, Thailand	Outdoor concert featuring guest performer Anchalee Jongkadeekij.
2006	The Rhythm of the Times	5 August 2006	Impact Arena	Pak Kret, Nonthaburi, Thailand	Featured guest appearances by T-Bone and Sena Hoi.
2007	Palmy Meets T-Bone in Flower Power Concert	2–3 June 2007	Moon Star Studio	Bangkok, Thailand	Collaborative concert with T-Bone, featuring rearranged versions of Palmy's songs, a cover of John Denver's "Leaving on a Jet Plane" and guest appearance by Peter Corp Dyrendal.
2012	Palmy Ka Ka Ka Concert	28–29 January 2012	Impact Arena	Pak Kret, Nonthaburi, Thailand	Featured guests Erlend Øye of Kings of Convenience, Hugo (ฮิวโก้ จุลจักร จักรพงษ์), and Sena Hoi (เสนาหอย เกียรติศักดิ์ อุดมนาค).
2013	Palmy Barefoot Acoustic Concert	21–22 September 2013	BITEC Convention Hall	Bang Na, Bangkok, Thailand	Acoustic-themed concert.
2024	Palmy Universe Concert	7–8, 11–12 September 2024	Impact Arena	Pak Kret, Nonthaburi, Thailand	
2025	PALMY Concert: ทำบุญหวังผล	3–4 May 2025	UOB Live, Emsphere	Bangkok, Thailand	Charity concert.
