= Seed 97.5 FM =

Defunct radio station in Thailand

Seed 97.5 FM (Thai: ซี๊ด เอฟเอ็ม) is a radio station owned and operated by MCOT and based in Bangkok, Thailand. It broadcasts over the 97.5 MHz FM frequency in the Greater Bangkok area, and is repeated nationwide through MCOT Radio's regional network.

Seed 97.5 FM ceased broadcasting on 1 January 2017. It was replaced by 97.5 Keep It Mellow.
