= The Voice Thailand =

- Genre: Singing Competition
- Created by: John de Mol Jr.
- Presented by: Songsit Roongnophakunsri; Rinlanee Sripen
- Judges: Kong Saharat; Joey Boy; Jennifer Kim; Stamp Apiwat; Singto Numchok; Da Endorphine; Pop Pongkool; Jaii Taitosmith; Oat Pramote
- Country of origin: Thailand
- Original language: Thai
- No. of series: 9
- No. of episodes: 75

Production
- Production location: Bangkok
- Camera setup: Multi-camera
- Running time: 90–105 min
- Production companies: The One Enterprise, PlanB Media PCL., Independent Artist Management, Exit 365 Co., LTD

Original release
- Network: Channel 3
- Release: 9 September 2012 – 25 February 2018
- Network: PPTV HD
- Release: 19 November 2018 – 23 December 2019
- Network: One31
- Release: 8 September 2024 – present

Related
- The Voice

The Voice เสียงจริงตัวจริง, (also known as The Voice Thailand) is a Thai reality television series on the Channel 3 television network. It premiered on 9 September 2012 on Channel 3. The format is adapted from the original Dutch version, The Voice of Holland. The program was commissioned after a successful first season in the United States, where the program aired on NBC domestically, and AXN Asia regionally. It is produced by True Music and Toh-Klom Televisions. After producing six seasons, in 2018, the show was acquired by PPTV HD for two seasons. After 2 years passed, during the COVID-19 pandemic, The Voice Thailand came back with the "All Stars" season in One31.

During the final of season 9, One 31 announced that the show will be renewed for the tenth season to air this 2025 with the release of the new series, The Voice Pride in 2025 and the Voice Charity which will start after the end of the ninth season with all coaches from season 9 return in this spin-off.

== Format ==
The Voice is a reality television series that features four coaches looking for a talented new artist, who could become a global superstar. The show's concept is indicated by its title: the coaches do not judge the artists by their looks, personalities, stage presence, or dance routines, only their vocal ability. It is this aspect that differentiates The Voice from other reality television series such as The X Factor, Britain's Got Talent or even Must Be the Music. In the Blind auditions, the competitors are split into four teams, which are mentored by the coaches. If a coach likes what they hear, a button-press allows their chair to spin around and face the performer, signifying that they would like to mentor them. If more than one does so, then the artist selects a coach. However, if no coach turns around then the artist is sent home. There are five different stages: producers' auditions, blind auditions, battles, knockouts, and live shows.

== Coaches and contestants ==
=== Coaches ===
Coaches	Season									
Coaches	1	2	3	4	5	6	7	8	9	10
Kong Saharat										
Joey Boy										
Jennifer Kim										
Stamp Apiwat										
Singto Numchok										
Da Endorphine										
Pop Pongkool										
Jaii Taitosmith										
Oat Pramote										
Bowkylion									C.B.	

=== Contestants ===
Winning coach and/or contestant, with winners in bold
Runner-up coach and/or contestant
3rd place coach and/or contestant
4th place coach and/or contestant

Season	Coaches and their live shows' contestants				
Season	Kong Saharat	Jennifer Kim	Joey Boy	Stamp Apiwat	-
1	**Thanon Chamroen** Sarocha Senarat Nawatchaphat Chaiyatha Natthawadi Dokkathin Ekkaphon Rattanakamphon & Kiratikan Phongthongsamran Phichaya Chanwilai	Trakan Sisaengchan Wichaya Wongsuriyan Tunraya Chanthawong Wirasak Kluea-kin Orawi Phinitsanphirom Kumarika Supphakon	Thachaya Prathumwan Bongkot Charoentham Phiranan Chanaphantharak Chitsuda Heng-ratsami Sapha Phanit-attra Chirawut Chanchaisaeng	Phichet Bua-kham Natthawut Chenmana Duangphon Phongphasuk Chonthicha Yotsaphon Narin Prasopphakdi Prakaidao Sukkhawat	-
2	Wanlika Ketsawaphithak Natthita Siyanon Sermsartr Del Rosario Chanowat Phirisaisanti	Kritsada Phisetphatthanakun Lalita Chuengwatthanakit Natcha Chittanon Watchara Kanyaphon	Kittinan Chinsamran Thanaphon Mahatthanadun Waruni Chanthrasirirangsi Thikhamphon Phritaphon	**Rangsan Panyaruen** Fonpha Pramoj na Ayudhaya Chamaphon Saengthong Naphat Sirinin	-
3	Panchaphon Thammason Banthita Prachamon Niwirin Limkangwanmongkhon Thiraphap Kramonmanit	**Somsak Rinnairak** Phlengpraphan Kingthong Palirat Konbang Annawari Rivollon	Charunwit Phuaphanwatthana Ingrid Witzany Prangthip Thalaeng Kulitsara Sakunrat	Suthita Chanachaisuwan Suchat Saeheng Kunchira Khongthong Panithan Thanchai	-
4	Kong Saharat	Jennifer Kim	Joey Boy	Singto Numchok	-
4	Anchuli-on Buakaeo Chiranan Phanthuwon Phatthranut Sitawan Bunyaphon Bunlom	Samat Niamsa-at Manatsanan Aksonthueng Narat-hathai Warotamaphat Watcharaphong Sirirak	**Thitthinan Onpan** Rungrat Mengphanit Naraphong Pramot Yada Komet	Phongthon Pathumanon Ratchayawi Wirasutthimat Phitsini Wirasutthimat Ardawan Habibzadeh	-
5	Kong Saharat	Da Endorphine	Joey Boy	Singto Numchok	-
5	Anon Watchariwong na Ayutthaya Thamonwan Koplapthanakun Methasit Wangdi Thakon Choengkhunthot	Natthapong Thongmueang Opkhwan Kinglakmueang Bancha Khamluecha Chonchanok Tatiyongmongkhonchai	**Siphum Bencharat** Noppharut Si-muang Witthawat Sankonkit Phirachat Suwatthawichai	Phatcharaphon Bunchu Kittiwat Rungrueng Natthanot Chunhakan Phiraphat Sitthawong	-
6	Sirinthra Chanathap Yukonchat Ketphasa Chirawan Sonsa-atdi Chainarong Phrombuppha	Benjamin James Dolley Suphakchaya Rattanamai Piyathida Lekklang Kittiphong & Kanthira	Pathitta & Saran Phawida Morici Chonlaphat Setthasitthikun Chuthamat Sapsiri	**Wachirawit Chinkoet** Ekkaphan Wannasut Saypaseuth Phommavongxay Chitlada Thirinthong	-
7	Kong Saharat	Jennifer Kim	Joey Boy	Pongkool Suebsung	-
7	Onratda Rojjanatechasiri Apisit Suriwong Alongkorn Sirimahaweero Aree Rueangsawat	Wathanyoo Pringhatyai Ekkarat Phonsri Thatsanai Kittirungsuwan Thitiyakorn Thongsri	**Pongsatorn Kambang** Wanchaleom Luangprathum Buma & Suphamet Worraruethai Phakdiwijit	Sayapha Singchu Jakkrit Khamjit Areeya Rotjanadit Nutprawe & Khrongkwan	-
8	**Eakkamon Bunphothong** Yotsawadee Premcharoen	Kunjira Thongkham	Yanawut Jarearnartiput	Sakunchay Plianram Aumaporn Galasiram	-
9	Kong Saharat	Jennifer Kim	Jaii Taitosmith	Oat Pramote	Bowkylion
9	Chonchaya Kasianratanakul Yingrak Khunwiset	**Theerapong Wanlak** Patrick Noelly	Suthitep Satnako Chonlada Thongbai	Pattriya Phayom Papassorn Han Williams	Thiti Euasalung

== Season summary ==
The Voice Thailand series overview
Season	First aired	Last aired	Winner	Runner-up	Other finalists		Winning coach	Presenter(s)	Coaches (chairs' order)			
Season	First aired	Last aired	Winner	Runner-up	Other finalists		Winning coach	Presenter(s)	1	2	3	4
1	Sep 9, 2012	Dec 15, 2012	Tanont Chumroen	Tachaya Prathumwan	Trakan Sisaengchan	Phichet Bua-kham	Kong Saharat	Songsit Roongnophakunsri	Stamp	Joey	Kim	Kong
2	Sep 8, 2013	Dеc 15, 2013	Rangsan Panyaruen	Wanlika Ketsawaphithak	Kittinan Chinsamran	Kritsada; Phisetphatthanakun	Stamp Apiwat	Songsit Roongnophakunsri, Rinlanee Sripen (backstage)	Stamp	Joey	Kim	Kong
3	Sep 7, 2014	Dec 14, 2014	Somsak Rinnairak	Suthita Chanachaisuwan	Charunwit; Phuaphanwatthana	Panchaphon Thammason	Jennifer Kim	Songsit Roongnophakunsri, Rinlanee Sripen (backstage)	Stamp	Joey	Kim	Kong
4	Sep 6, 2015	Dec 13, 2015	Thitthinan Onpan	Anchuli-on Buakaeo	Samat Niamsa-at	Phongthon; Pathumanon	Joey Boy	Songsit Roongnophakunsri, Rinlanee Sripen (backstage)	Singto	Joey	Kim	Kong
5	Sep 11, 2016	Feb 5, 2017	Siphum Bencharat	Natthaphong Thongmueang	Anon Watchariwong	Phatcharaphon Bunchu	Joey Boy	Songsit Roongnophakunsri, Rinlanee Sripen (backstage)	Singto	Joey	Da	Kong
6	Nov 12, 2017	Feb 25, 2018	Wachirawit Chinkoet	Benjamin James Dolley	Pathitta & Saran	Suphakchaya; Rattanamai	Singto Numchok	Songsit Roongnophakunsri, Rinlanee Sripen (backstage)	Singto	Joey	Da	Kong
7	Nov 19, 2018	Mar 4, 2019	Pongsatorn Kambang	Onratda; Rojjanatechasiri	Sayapha Singchu	Jakkrit Khamjit	Joey Boy	Songsit Roongnophakunsri	Pop	Joey	Kim	Kong
8	Sep 16, 2019	Dec 23, 2019	Eakkamon Bunphothong	Sakunchay Plianram	Yanawut; Jarearnartiput	Kunjira Thongkham	Kong Saharat	Songsit Roongnophakunsri	Pop	Joey	Kim	Kong
9	Sep 8, 2024	Dec 15, 2024	Theeraphong Wanlak	Sutithep Satnako	Chonchaya Kasianratanakul	Pattriya Phayom	Jennifer Kim	Songsit Roongnophakunsri	Oat	Kong	Jaii	Kim
10	Oct 11, 2026	Current Season						Songsit Roongnophakunsri	Oat	Kong	Jaii	Kim

== The Voice Kids ==
The Voice Kids is a singing competition for children aged 7 to 14 years, and a junior version of The Voice Thailand. Following the success of the first season of The Voice Thailand, the series was produced after purchasing rights from Talpa Media Group in the Netherlands, making Thailand the sixth country to start producing The Voice Kids.

Coach	Seasons						
Coach	1	2	3	4	5	6	7
Nipaporn Thititanakarn							
Thanaporn Wagprayoon							
Popetorn Soonthornyanakij							
Sumet & Punk							
Tik Shiro							
Lula Kanyarat							
Rudklao Amratisha							
Joke							
Patcharida Wattana							
Wan Thanakrit							

=== Series overview ===
Warning: the following table presents a significant amount of different colors.

Thai The Voice Kids series overview
Season	First aired	Last aired	Winner	Runners-up			Winning coach	Presenters	Coaches (chairs' order)			
Season	First aired	Last aired	Winner	Runners-up			Winning coach	Presenters	1	2	3	4
1	April 27, 2013	June 15, 2013	Kuljira Tongkham	Prapasiri Sapprasert	Thanathat Noiphimai	No fourth finalist	Parn Thanaporn	Songsit Roongnophakunsri, Rinlanee Sripen	Two	Parn	Zani	No fourth coach
2	February 7, 2014	March 30, 2014	Pornsawun Yanvaro	Yonradee Khumkanokkan	Piyathida Lekklang	No fourth finalist	Sumet & Punk	Songsit Roongnophakunsri, Rinlanee Sripen	Parn	Sumet & Punk	Zani	No fourth coach
3	February 1, 2015	March 29, 2015	Natharika Phetfu	Jarutpon Phongphaew	Napatsakorn Kasemporn	No fourth finalist	Zani Nipaporn	Songsit Roongnophakunsri, Rinlanee Sripen	Parn	Sumet & Punk	Zani	No fourth coach
4	January 17, 2016	March 13, 2016	Jedsada Sukharom	Nathamon Arunprasopsu	Siampon Singchu	No fourth finalist	Lula Kanyarat	Songsit Roongnophakunsri, Rinlanee Sripen	Lula	Tik	Rudklao	No fourth coach
5	April 23, 2017	June 18, 2017	Siripong Srisukha	Yada Satjakun	Wanchaya Tubtimlek	No fourth finalist	Tik Shiro	Songsit Roongnophakunsri, Rinlanee Sripen	Lula	Tik	Rudklao	No fourth coach
6	April 8, 2019	June 3, 2019	Siri Chaikul	Prinrat Chimthum	Sirapan Piyadirat	Yanisa Petchsri	Mam Patcharida	Songsit Roongnophakunsri, Sawitree Sutthichanon	Lula	Joke	Mam	Tik
7	July 13, 2020	September 7, 2020	Gracy Phattanan	Sandy Yanisa	Krista Shim	Tong Panprapron	Tik Shiro	Songsit Roongnophakunsri, Sawitree Sutthichanon	Wan	Joke	Mam	Tik

== The Voice Senior ==
The Voice Senior is a singing competition for contestants over the age of 60, being a senior version of The Voice Thailand. The series is produced by PPTV 36 after acquiring the show from the original Dutch version. Also, this is the first The Voice Senior of Asia.

Coach	Seasons	
Coach	1	2
Kong Saharat		
Stamp Apiwat		
Tam Charas		
Parn Thanaporn		
Took Viyada		

=== Series overview ===
Thai The Voice Senior series overview
Season	First aired	Last aired	Winner	Runner-up	Third place	Fourth place	Winning coach	Presenter	Coaches (chairs' order)			
Season	First aired	Last aired	Winner	Runner-up	Third place	Fourth place	Winning coach	Presenter	1	2	3	4
1	Mar 11, 2019	Apr 1, 2019	Sanae Damkham	Sukit Sapphasri	Pongsri Ketsuwan	Samart Sukkanit	Stamp Apiwat	Songsit Roongnophakunsri	Kong	Stamp	Parn	Charas
2	Feb 17, 2020	Mar 30, 2020	Pom-Sirimat Chiamangthong	Brats-Panya Prompinit	Tim-Orsa Thongthap	Boyd-Krittaphat Phenaloosa	Kong Saharat	Songsit Roongnophakunsri	Stamp	Kong	Took	Charas

== The Voice All Stars ==
After a 2-year break because of the COVID-19 pandemic, The Voice Thailand announced through Instagram and other social media platforms that they will be broadcasting an All-Star edition in July, which is the first in Asia (second to air, because the Indonesian version has aired first even it announced later). The show will occur by One 31 instead of PPTV 36. This season will join by former contestants, former coaches and winners in every season. The coaches are Kong Saharat, Jennifer Kim, Joey Boy, Pop Pongkul.

Thai The Voice All Stars series overview
Season	First aired	Last aired	Winner	Runner-up	Other finalists		Winning coach	Presenter	Coaches (chairs' order)			
Season	First aired	Last aired	Winner	Runner-up	Other finalists		Winning coach	Presenter	1	2	3	4
1	July 17, 2022	Oct 16, 2022	Ekkaphan Wannasut	Tachaya Prathumwan	Wanlika Ketsawaphithak	Prangthip Thalaeng	Jennifer Kim	Songsit Roongnophakunsri	Joey	Kim	Kong	Pop

== The Voice Pride ==
The Voice Pride premiered on 15 June 2025 on Channel 7HD. In this version, LGBTQIA+ artists are highlighted, showcasing their voices to the panel of three coaches. The coaches for the show are Ben Chalatit, Timethai, and Amp Leelaboot.

The Voice Pride series overview
Season	First aired	Last aired	Winner	Runner-up	Other finalists		Winning coach	Presenter	Coaches (chairs' order)		
Season	First aired	Last aired	Winner	Runner-up	Other finalists		Winning coach	Presenter	1	2	3
1	June 15, 2025	Aug 10, 2025	Nerd Natnicha	Dummy Wutthipong	Topsy Thanaphat	Aom Amadiva	Ben Chalatit	Songsit Roongnophakunsri	Ben	Timethai	Amp

== The Voice Teens ==
The Voice Teens will premiere in January 2027 on True4U. In this version, artists of age 13 to age 19 are highlighted, showcasing their voices to the panel of four coaches. The coaches for the show are Jeff Satur, Waruntorn Paonil, Toy and former Comeback Stage coach Bowkylion.

The Voice Teens series overview
Season	First aired	Last aired	Winner	Runner-up	Other finalists	Winning coach	Presenter	Coaches (chairs' order)			
Season	First aired	Last aired	Winner	Runner-up	Other finalists	Winning coach	Presenter	1	2	3	4
1	TBA 2027						Paris Intarakomalyasut	Jeff	Ink	Toy	Bowky
