= The Voice Thailand season 8 =

The Voice Thailand
- Season 8
- Hosted by: Songsit Rungnopphakhunsi
- Coaches: Kong Saharat; Jennifer Kim; Joey Boy; Pop Pongkool

Release
- Original network: PPTV and LINE TV
- Original release: 16 September – 23 December 2019

Season chronology
- ← Previous; Season 7

The eighth season of the Thai reality television show, The Voice Thailand premiered on September 16, 2019, on PPTV and LINE TV. Kong Saharat, Jennifer Kim, Joey Boy and Pop Pongkool returning as coaches from the previous season. The show hosted by Songsit Rungnopphakhunsi.

== Teams ==
Color key

- Winner
- Runner-up
- Third place
- Fourth place
- Eliminated in the Final
- Eliminated in the Playoffs
- Eliminated in the Battles
- Stolen in the Knockouts
- Eliminated in the Knockouts

Coaches	Top 64 artists				
Kong Saharat					
Kong Saharat	Eakkamon Bunphothong	Yotsawadee Premchareon	Nattawadee Puangsuwan	Warodom Prathis	Porntip Phantawong
Kong Saharat	Kanda Suwannachai	~~T.Y.K. Trio~~	Kosin Pomieam	Nomerzy	Sittichai Chaiyadej
Kong Saharat	Thammachat Seehanam	Annop Panya	Sunset	Thanatkit Jinanang	Soul Squad
Kong Saharat	Putthakhun & Patimet	Panita Tangkasemjit			
Jennifer Kim					
Jennifer Kim	Kunjira Thongkham	S SOON S	Voravarun Noikamol	Naruedon Jaiboon	Jorrakenoi
Jennifer Kim	Khamarali Bindaud	~~Kanda Suwannachai~~	~~Pradiphat Kongkuldet~~	Kritsanat Krodnoo	Natthiya & Jirayut
Jennifer Kim	Juthamas Hanphala	Autsadawut Klinkhajorn	Suthida Sornsakda	Butsarapohn Tapseekaeo	Namtip Phoso
Jennifer Kim	Wilasinee Kassanuka	Puri Sratongtuan			
Joey Boy					
Joey Boy	Yanawut Jarearnartiput	ERROR 99	Khanyawee Nukaew	Four Unity	Pachara Chitburut
Joey Boy	T.Y.K. Trio	Suphanut Leotsanongbun	Kitthiphong Sriphaeng	Thantarat Klinuthai	Jedtapon Kanistachat
Joey Boy	Sisters' Time	Phonthawat Sakhunyonphaisan	Ratchatawan Bunwong	Pimrata Phukhang	Pranom Bunyaliang
Joey Boy	Chatuphon Pomngam	Naphatsakorn Suriya			
Pop Pongkool					
Pop Pongkool	Sakunchay Plianram	Aumaporn Galasiram	Pradiphat Kongkuldet	Rawekarn Bunkeod	EYESTYLES
Pop Pongkool	Sitthichai Pungsaeng	~~Khamarali Bindaud~~	F.I.T.	Anuphap Phrommachan	Jitwimon Tiamjan
Pop Pongkool	Titima Wongviriyawong	Nailada & Lalita	Chantra Tran	Chadanuch Sookmak	Thanawat & Jetsadang
Pop Pongkool	Passakorn & Taksin Chainet	Thaitong			
Note:Italicized names are stolen contestants (names struck through within former teams). Underlined names are artists who were saved by their coach in the Knockouts and advanced to the Battles.

== Blind Auditions ==
The Block, added in season 7, returned for a second season, the number of available blocks is raised from two to three for each coach.

Also new this season, trios, quartets and bands were allowed onto the show.

Color key

Coach pressed "I WANT YOU" button
Coach pressed the "I WANT YOU" button, but was "blocked" by Kong from getting the artist
Coach pressed the "I WANT YOU" button, but was "blocked" by Kim from getting the artist
Coach pressed the "I WANT YOU" button, but was "blocked" by Joey from getting the artist
Coach pressed the "I WANT YOU" button, but was "blocked" by Pop from getting the artist
Artist defaulted to a coach's team
Artist elected a coach's team
Artist was eliminated with no coach pressing their button

=== Episode 1 (September 16) ===
Order	Artist	Age	Hometown	Song	Coach's and artist's choices			
Order	Artist	Age	Hometown	Song	Kong	Kim	Joey	Pop
1	Kritsanat Krodnoo	20	Chumphon	"ถ้าปล่อยให้เธอเดินผ่าน"	—		—	—
2	F.I.T.	Unknown	Bangkok	"Spend My Life with You"			—	
3	Thanawat Phalasoon & Jetsadang Rattanatharot	20	Bangkok	"MICROPHONE"		—		
4	Naruedon Jaiboon	20	Chiang Mai	"ขอเพียงที่พักใจ"			—	—
5	Chanthasome Bannaphone	30	Vientiane, Laos	"Drive"	—	—	—	—
6	Nattawadee Puangsuwan	25	Phetchaburi	"ไม่รักดี"		—	—	—
7	ERROR 99	Unknown	Bangkok	"เสมอ"		—		
8	Kunjira Thongkham	19	Kamphaeng Phet	"I Just Called To Say I Love You"				
9	Pachara Chitburut	25	Songkhla	"ดูโง่โง่"				

=== Episode 2 (September 23) ===
Order	Artist	Age	Hometown	Song	Coach's and artist's choices			
Order	Artist	Age	Hometown	Song	Kong	Kim	Joey	Pop
1	Chatuphon Pomngam	28	Chonburi	"หนูไม่ยอม"		—		
2	Benchamaphon Kueahong	46	Phetchaburi	"Tennessee Waltz"	—	—	—	—
3	Sitthichai Pungsaeng	22	Ubon Ratchathani	"ธิดาประจําอําเภอ"				
4	Kosin Pomieam	37	Samut Prakan	"Unaware"			—	—
5	S SOON S	Unknown	Samut Prakan	"เจ้าตาก"				
6	Natthiya Boonmee & Jirayut Sertwassana	23 & 25	Phetchaburi	"สิ่งที่ไม่เคยบอก"	—		—	—
7	Anuphap Phrommachan	17	Chumphon	"โอ้ใจเอ๋ย"	—		—	
8	Korawee Lianglekchamnong	31	Chonburi	"คุณคือดวงจันทร์ ฉันสิคนบ้า"	—	—	—	—
9	Warodom Prathis	23	Phitsanulok	"รักหนีที่เซเว่น"				

=== Episode 3 (September 30) ===
Order	Artist	Age	Hometown	Song	Coach's and artist's choices			
Order	Artist	Age	Hometown	Song	Kong	Kim	Joey	Pop
1	Eakkamon Bunphothong	25	Nonthaburi	"ไม่มีฝีมือ"		—	—	—
2	Jitwimon Tiamjan	27	Ubon Ratchathani	"ชอบแบบนี้"			—	
3	Natthaphan Phakdeenarong	20	Netherlands	"Pattaya Lover"	—	—	—	—
4	Suphanut Leotsanongbun	22	Bangkok	"Moonlight Densetsu"	—	—		
5	Pranom Bunyaliang	52	Phichit	"มอเตอร์ไซค์นุ่งสั้น"	—	—		
6	Atchara Jitpanya	22	Udon Thani	"ปวดใจ"	—	—	—	—
7	Khamarali Bindaud	17	Narathiwat	"Day 1"			—	
8	T.Y.K. Trio	Unknown	Phra Nakhon Si Ayutthaya	"My Girl"		—	—	—
9	Wilasinee Kassanuka	18	Khon Kaen	"นางฟ้าสารภัญ"	—		—	—
10	Four Unity	Unknown	Bangkok	"What a Wonderful World"	—	—		—

=== Episode 4 (October 7) ===
Order	Artist	Age	Hometown	Song	Coach's and artist's choices			
Order	Artist	Age	Hometown	Song	Kong	Kim	Joey	Pop
1	Kittikhun Suntornsiriwet	26	Ratchaburi	"ร็อคเริงใจ"	—	—	—	—
2	Porntip Phantawong	30	Nakhon Pathom	"หัวใจขอมา"			—	—
3	Passakorn & Taksin Chainet	25 & 19	Roi Et	"อย่าขอหมอลำ"	—		—	
4	Thaitong	Unknown	Pathum Thani	"บ้า"	—	—	—	
5	Panita Tangkasemjit	35	Bangkok	"คำตอบสุดท้าย"		—	—	—
6	Suthida Sornsakda	17	Sweden	"Stars"	—		—	—
7	Naphatsakorn Suriya	22	Nan	"บ้านบนดอย"	—	—		—
8	Silsarut Ketjinda	18	Samut Prakan	"Something"	—	—	—	—
9	Kitthiphong Sriphaeng	18	Nakhon Phanom	"แก้มน้องนางนั้นแดงกว่าใคร"				
10	Pradiphat Kongkuldet	21	Songkhla	"How Will I Know"			—	

=== Episode 5 (October 14) ===
Order	Artist	Age	Hometown	Song	Coach's and artist's choices			
Order	Artist	Age	Hometown	Song	Kong	Kim	Joey	Pop
1	Chantra Tran	26	Sa Kaeo	"Stand by Me"	—	—	—	
2	Nomerzy	Unknown	Bangkok	"ไม่แก่ตาย"		—	—	—
3	Rawekarn Bunkeod	23	Nakhon Pathom	"อายแสงนีออน"			—	
4	Thidarat Ployliang	30	Chonburi	"กำลังใจ"	—	—	—	—
5	Yanawut Jarearnartiput	29	Chonburi	"Taki Taki"				
6	Butsarapohn Tapseekaeo	21	Nakhon Phanom	"อยู่บ่ได้"	—		—	—
7	Thantarat Klinuthai	25	Bangkok	"The Middle"	—	—		
8	Nirada Jiratechokit	43	Samut Songkhram	"โอ้รัก"	—	—	—	—
9	Sittichai Chaiyadej	23	Bangkok	"นอกจากชื่อฉัน"		—	—	—
10	Jedtapon Kanistachat	23	Bangkok	"ทนพิษบาดแผลไม่ไหว"				

=== Episode 6 (October 21) ===
Order	Artist	Age	Hometown	Song	Coach's and artist's choices			
Order	Artist	Age	Hometown	Song	Kong	Kim	Joey	Pop
1	Sisters' Time	Unknown	Bangkok	"Shalala Lala"	—	—		—
2	Thammachat Seehanam	25	Songkhla	"ยาพิษ"		—	—	—
3	Khanyawee Nukaew	18	Pathum Thani	"ดาวเรืองดาวโรย"				
4	Annop Panya	40	Ranong	"ยิ่งรัก ยิ่งห่าง"		—	—	
5	Anuwat Bunma	30	Kamphaeng Phet	"ส้มหล่น"	—	—	—	—
6	Muttofa Koonlang	18	Satun	"หนุ่ม ต.จ.ว."	—	—	—	—
7	Sanan Khaimusik	25	Suphan Buri	"คิดถึงบ้าน"	—	—	—	—
8	Yotsawadee Premchareon	22	Chachoengsao	"New Soul"		—	—	—
9	EYESTYLES	Unknown	Chiang Mai	"All I Want"	—	—	—	
10	Puri Sratongtuan	17	Bangkok	"ห่วงใย"	—		—	—
11	Titima Wongviriyawong	36	Bangkok	"ครั้งสุดท้าย"	—			

=== Episode 7 (October 28) ===
Order	Artist	Age	Hometown	Song	Coach's and artist's choices			
Order	Artist	Age	Hometown	Song	Kong	Kim	Joey	Pop
1	Kanda Suwannachai	31	Bangkok	"รักไม่ช่วยอะไร"	—		—	—
2	Sunset	Unknown	Suphan Buri	"รูปหล่อถมไป"		—	—	
3	Ninaj Nikaji	21	Pattani	"ฤดูที่แตกต่าง"	—	—	—	—
4	Sakunchay Plianram	21	Buriram	"ปราณี"				
5	Thanatkit Jinanang	29	Chiangmai	"Three Little Birds"		—	—	—
6	Phonthawat Sakhunyonphaisan	26	Chiangmai	"Miss You Tonight"	—	—		
7	Chadanuch Sookmak	23	Prachuap Khiri Khan	"แม้ว่า"	—		—	
8	Rotchana Sangyaro	25	Bangkok	"ราชาเงินผ่อน"	—	—	—	—
9	Nailada Rodphai & Lalita Sripudpong	23 & 27	Bangkok & Samut Prakan	"สบตา"	—	—	—	
10	Namtip Phoso	28	Chonburi	"หมากเกมนี้"	—		—	—
11	Jorrakenoi	Unknown	Bangkok	"มนุษย์ค้างคาว"			—	—

=== Episode 8 (November 4) ===
Order	Artist	Age	Hometown	Song	Coach's and artist's choices			
Order	Artist	Age	Hometown	Song	Kong	Kim	Joey	Pop
1	Ratchatawan Bunwong	53	Pathum Thani	"เพียงสบตา"	—	—		—
2	Soul Squad	Unknown	Bangkok	"หนึ่งเดียวคนนี้"		—	—	—
3	Juthamas Hanphala	17	Maha Sarakham	"ให้เคอรี่มาส่งได้บ่"	—		—	—
4	Autsadawut Klinkhajorn	23	Chonburi	"เจ้าชายนิทรา"	—		—	
5	Pimrata Phukhang	24	Suphan Buri	"แค่คืบ"	—	—		—
6	Anyamanee Tianhorm	23	Bangkok	"ฝุ่น"	—	—	Team full	—
7	Prapatsorn Kaeotawe	29	Kanchanaburi	"จะขอก็รีบขอ"	—	—	Team full	—
8	Putthakhun Somin & Patimet Khongsomboon	26 & 37	Nakhon Sawan	"สัญญาหน้าฝน"		—	Team full	—
9	Pitchayanee Wisetphuttasat	28	Nakhon Pathom	"No One"	Team full	—	Team full	—
10	Aumaporn Galasiram	22	Buriram	"Hello Mama"	Team full		Team full	
11	Aphinan Chimphawong	30	Nakhon Nayok	"ความทรงจำสีจาง"	Team full	—	Team full	Team full
12	Voravarun Noikamol	19	Bangkok	"คาใจ"	Team full		Team full	Team full

== The Knockouts ==
For the third consecutive season, the knockouts came before the battle rounds. This time, each coach needs to group their teams into four groups of four artists each. Each artist will sing a different song. Only one will win per group. Steals were decreased from two to one this season, but for the first time, coaches are allowed to save one losing artist from their team.

At the end of the round, 6 artists per team remain, for a total of 24 artists advancing to the battle round.

Color key:

Artist won the Battle and advanced to the Knockouts
Artist lost the Battle but was stolen by another coach and advanced to the Knockouts
Artist lost the Battle but was saved by their coach and advanced to the Knockouts
Artist lost the Battle and was eliminated

Episodes	Order	Coach	Song	Artists		Song	'Steal' result			
Episodes	Order	Coach	Song	Winner	Loser	Song	Kong	Kim	Joey	Pop
Episode 9 (November 11)	1	Jennifer Kim	"เรือเล็กควรออกจากฝั่ง"	S SOON S	Pradiphat Kongkuldet	"Purple Rain"	—	—	—	
Episode 9 (November 11)	1	Jennifer Kim	"เรือเล็กควรออกจากฝั่ง"	S SOON S	Puri Sratongtuan	"ร้องไห้ง่ายง่ายกับเรื่องเดิมเดิม"	—	—	—	Steal used
Episode 9 (November 11)	1	Jennifer Kim	"เรือเล็กควรออกจากฝั่ง"	S SOON S	Wilasinee Kassanuka	"เต้ยลาหน้าเฟส"	—	—	—	Steal used
Episode 9 (November 11)	2	Pop Pongkool	"มณีในกล่องแก้ว"	Sitthichai Pungsaeng	Thaitong	"ตาสว่าง"	—	—	—	—
Episode 9 (November 11)	2	Pop Pongkool	"มณีในกล่องแก้ว"	Sitthichai Pungsaeng	Passakorn & Taksin Chainet	"ใจกลางเมือง"	—	—	—	—
Episode 9 (November 11)	2	Pop Pongkool	"มณีในกล่องแก้ว"	Sitthichai Pungsaeng	Thanawat & Jetsadang	"เค้าก่อน (Rebound)"	—	—	—	—
Episode 9 (November 11)	3	Joey Boy	"กอดฉัน"	Khanyawee Nukaew	Naphatsakorn Suriya	"ล่องแม่ปิง"	—	—	—	Steal used
Episode 9 (November 11)	3	Joey Boy	"กอดฉัน"	Khanyawee Nukaew	Chatuphon Pomngam	"สังหารหมู่"	—	—	—	Steal used
Episode 9 (November 11)	3	Joey Boy	"กอดฉัน"	Khanyawee Nukaew	Pranom Bunyaliang	"ชีวิตบัดซบ"	—	—	—	Steal used
Episode 9 (November 11)	4	Kong Saharat	"แด่คนเคยรัก"	Yotsawadee Premchareon	Panita Tangkasemjit	"Miss Call"	—	—	—	Steal used
Episode 9 (November 11)	4	Kong Saharat	"แด่คนเคยรัก"	Yotsawadee Premchareon	Putthakhun & Patimet	"Old Town Road"	—	—	—	Steal used
Episode 9 (November 11)	4	Kong Saharat	"แด่คนเคยรัก"	Yotsawadee Premchareon	Soul Squad	"ขอบใจจริง ๆ"	—	—	—	Steal used
Episode 9 (November 11)	5	Pop Pongkool	"Please"	Sakunchay Plianram	EYESTYLES	"สาวอีสานรอรัก"	—	—	—	
Episode 9 (November 11)	5	Pop Pongkool	"Please"	Sakunchay Plianram	Chadanuch Sookmak	"ไม่เดียงสา"	—	—	—	Team full
Episode 9 (November 11)	5	Pop Pongkool	"Please"	Sakunchay Plianram	Chantra Tran	"อยากกินตีน"	—	—	—	Team full
Episode 10 (November 18)							—	—	—	
Episode 10 (November 18)							—	—	—	
Episode 10 (November 18)							—	—	—	
Episode 10 (November 18)							—	—	—	
Episode 10 (November 18)							—	—	—	
Episode 10 (November 18)							—	—	—	
Episode 10 (November 18)							—	—	—	
Episode 10 (November 18)							—	—	—	
Episode 10 (November 18)							—	—	—	
Episode 10 (November 18)							—	—	—	
Episode 10 (November 18)							—	—	—	
Episode 10 (November 18)							—	—	—	
Episode 10 (November 18)							—	—	—	
Episode 10 (November 18)							—	—	—	
Episode 10 (November 18)							—	—	—	
Episode 10 (November 18)							—	—	—	
Episode 10 (November 18)							—	—	—	
Episode 10 (November 18)							—	—	—	
Episode 11 (November 25)							—	—	—	
Episode 11 (November 25)							—	—	—	
Episode 11 (November 25)							—	—	—	
Episode 11 (November 25)							—	—	—	
Episode 11 (November 25)							—	—	—	
Episode 11 (November 25)							—	—	—	
Episode 11 (November 25)							—	—	—	
Episode 11 (November 25)							—	—	—	
Episode 11 (November 25)							—	—	—	
Episode 11 (November 25)							—	—	—	
Episode 11 (November 25)							—	—	—	
Episode 11 (November 25)							—	—	—	
Episode 11 (November 25)							—	—	—	
Episode 11 (November 25)							—	—	—	
Episode 11 (November 25)							—	—	—	

== The Battles ==
– Artist won the Battles and advanced to the Live Playoffs
– Artist lost the Battles and was eliminated

Episode	Order	Coach	Winner	Song	Loser
Episode 12 (December 2)					
Episode 13 (December 9)					
