= Under Her Nose =

- พ่อบ้านใจกล้าสตอรี
- Genre: Comedy drama; Romantic comedy
- Starring: Saharat Sangkapreecha; Jennifer Kim; Thanakrit Panichwid; Sakonrat Woraurai; Benjapol Cheuyaroon; Lapassalan Jiravechsoontornkul; Nachat Chanphan
- Opening theme: Chop Due - Wan Thanakrit
- Country of origin: Thailand
- Original language: Thai
- No. of seasons: 1
- No. of episodes: 26

Production
- Producers: Nareubadee Wetchakam; Issara Wetchakam
- Production location: Bangkok
- Running time: 60 minutes
- Production companies: Thai Broadcasting Company; The Pipal Tree

Original release
- Network: Workpoint TV
- Release: April 22 – November 4, 2017

Under Her Nose (Thai: พ่อบ้านใจกล้าสตอรี; Pho Ban Chai Kla Story) is a Thai comedy-drama television series, nominated Best Comedy Programme Asian Television Awards 2017. It aired on Saturday 10:15 - 11:15 a.m. on Workpoint TV starting 22 April, ending 4 November in 2017.

== Cast ==
- Saharat Sangkapreecha as Sun
- Jennifer Kim as Khim
- Thanakrit 'Wan' Panichwid as Win
- Sakonrat 'Four' Woraurai as Summer
- Benjapol 'Golf' Cheuyaroon as Dr. Thep
- Lapassalan Jiravechsoontornkul as Thaenchai
- Nachat 'Nikky' Chanphan as Tar

=== Guest cast ===
- Suraphon Poonpiriya ( EP.01)
- Sirapassara Sintrakarnphol (Pam Gaia) ( EP.02, EP.03, EP.06, EP.11) as Kookkik
- Nida Phatcharawiraphong (EP.03) as Cris
- Irin Sriklaeo (EP.04) as Angkhana
- Phanisa Udomrueakiat (Nun Gaia) (EP.04, EP.14) as Khim (young)
- Maneenuch Smerasut (EP.05, EP.06) as Mi
- Pan Plutaek (EP.05) as Doctor Pup
- Bon Jakobsen (EP.07, EP.25) as Wi; Win's sister
- Supoj Chancharoen (EP.08, EP.09) as Jo
- Intiporn Tamsukin (EP.10) as Naen
- Soodthiphong Thadphithakkoun (EP.13, EP.22) as Chat
- Atthama Chiwanitchaphan (EP.14) as Jen
- Supakorn Kitsuwon (EP.14, EP.20, EP.26) as Tiger
- Pharanyu Rojanawuthitham (EP.14) as Chak
- Penpak Sirikul (EP.15) as Nida
- Wongsakorn Rassamitat (EP.15) as Ton
- Natcha Janthapan (EP.16) as Daenthai
- Jintanutda Lummakanon (EP.17, EP.19) as Phirin
- Jularat Hanrungroj (EP.17) as Kat
- Komane Ruangkitrattanakul (EP.17) as Jo
- Sudthirak Srapwicjit (EP.18, EP.19)
- Pramote Thianchaikerdsilp (EP.21) as Bell
- Akkarin Akaranithimetrath (EP.21) as Songklot
- Yokyek Choenyim (EP.21) as Micro
- Pongpitch Preechaborisuthikul (EP.21)
- Primrata Dej-Udom (EP.22, EP.24) as Grace
- Nook Smat (The Voice Thailand) (EP.22)
- Jaidee Deedeedee (EP.23)
- Itthipat Thanit (EP.23, EP.24) as Bom
- Kaimuk Sup'tar (EP.24) as Aunt Noi

== Episode list ==
Episode	Original Air Date
1.1	22 April 2017
1.2	29 April 2017
1.3	6 May 2017
1.4	13 May 2017
1.5	20 May 2017
1.6	27 May 2017
1.7	3 June 2017
1.8	10 June 2017
1.9	17 June 2017
1.10	24 June 2017
1.11	1 July 2017
1.12	8 July 2017
1.13	15 July 2017
1.14	22 July 2017
1.15	29 July 2017
1.16	5 August 2017
1.17	12 August 2017
1.18	19 August 2017
1.19	26 August 2017
1.20	2 September 2017
1.21	9 September 2017
1.22	16 September 2017
1.23	23 September 2017
1.24	30 September 2017
1.25	7 October 2017
1.26	4 November 2017

== Opening Theme ==
- Chop Due - Supakorn Kitsuwon
- Chop Due - Thanakrit 'Wan' Panichwid (Feat. Sakonrat 'Four' Woraurai)

== Award ==
- Nominated Best Comedy Programme Asian Television Awards 2017

== Trivia ==
- Saharat Sangkapreecha (Kong) and Jennifer Kim (Kim) is two coaches on the singing contest The Voice Thailand.
- All of main casts; Saharat Sangkapreecha, Jennifer Kim, Thanakrit Panichwid, Sakonrat Woraurai, Benjapol Cheuyaroon and Nachat Chanphan are singers.
- The name of Win's former band is Boys' Generation from Girls' Generation.
