= The Voice Thailand season 6 =

The Voice Thailand
- Season 6
- Hosted by: Songsit Rungnopphakhunsi; Rinrani Siphen
- Coaches: Saharat Sangkapreecha; Thanida Thammawimon; Joey Boy; Namchok Natanrom
- Winner: Wachirawit Chinkoet
- Winning coach: Singto Numchok
- Runner-up: Benjamin James Dolley

Release
- Original network: Channel 3
- Original release: 12 November 2017 – 25 February 2018

Season chronology
- ← Previous; Season 5 Next → Season 7

The sixth series of The Voice เสียงจริงตัวจริง ( also known as The Voice Thailand ) on 12 November 2017. The show was hosted by Songsit Rungnopphakhunsi and Rinrani Siphen on Channel 3.

== Teams ==
Color key

- Winner
- Runner-up
- Eliminated in the Final
- Eliminated in the Live Shows

- Eliminated in the Battles
- Stolen in the Knockouts
- Eliminated in the Knockouts

Coaches	Top 48 artists			
Kong Saharat
Kong Saharat	Sirinthra Chanathap (Prang)	Yukonchat Ketphasa (Fay)	Chirawan Sonsa-atdi (Praew)	Chainarong Phrombuppha (Es)
Kong Saharat	Anuchit (Best) & Anucha (Boss) Panchamat	Khanittha Baisakun (Google)	Phongthon (Bung) & Banthun (Keaw)	Ratchada Kotkaeo (Nan)
Kong Saharat	~~Ratthanan Sisotthiyodom (Prite)~~	Chinda Wiriyasaengchan (Jin)	Edward Vanzo †	Phira Chuen-arom (Prite)
Kong Saharat	Rusichon Radatharanon (San)	Wanwisa Phama (Jene-jah)	-	-
Da Endorphin
Da Endorphin	Benjamin James Dolley (Ben)	Suphakchaya Rattanamai (Ploy)	Piyathida Lekklang (Maprang)	Kittiphong (Keng) & Kanthira (Kaofang)
Da Endorphin	Konkawat Sinlapi (Krit)	Nonsi Phaitunwongwira (Nate)	Patthama Marasi (Pat)	Worabut Thawirutchana (Nini)
Da Endorphin	~~Khanittha Baisakun (Google)~~	~~Nawin Thaola (Noo)~~	Chaiyot Phromchareon (Ton)	Chanita Krathong (Ink)
Da Endorphin	Hinano Chaiwirat (Kitty)	Phichamon Lo-thong (Som)	-	-
Joey Boy
Joey Boy	Pathitta (Preaw) & Saran (Champ) ^{a}	Phawida Moriggi (Silvy)	Chonlaphat Sestasittikul (EarnEarn)	Chuthamat Sapsiri (Oil)
Joey Boy	Valentina Giardullo (Ploy)	Satakhun Khongrit (Book)	Nawin Thaola (Noo)	~~Konkawat Sinlapi (Krit)~~
Joey Boy	~~Rungsiri (Natt) & Thinyakan (Golffy)~~	Chanakan Sawatdimongkon (Karn)	Prat Cheoiklang (Tom)	Suriya Ruengsi (Add)
Joey Boy	Thammanun Pannaphinthu (Taotor)	-	-	-
Singto Namchok
Singto Namchok	Wachirawit Chinkoet (Maimhon)	Ekkaphan Wannasut (Pure)	Saypaseuth Phommavongxay (Jacky)	Chitlada Thirinthong (Dear)
Singto Namchok	Bunyarit Charoenwong (Rotbus)	Panwet Saiyakhlai (Por)	Ratthanan Sisotthiyodom (Nan)	Rungsiri (Natt) & Thinyakan (Golffy)
Singto Namchok	~~Chirawan Sonsa-atdi (Praew)~~	~~Patthama Marasi (Pat)~~	~~Satakhun Khongrit (Book)~~	Chumsin Raknaisin (Mon)
Singto Namchok	Kraiwit Phumsukho (Tom)	Krittiya Ruchiphatchareon (Am)	Phimphloi Phukanngam (PP)	-
Singto Namchok	Note:Italicized names are stolen contestants (names struck through within former teams)			

- ^a Pathitta & Saran originally were solo artist but Joey Boy chose both of them to advance as a duo in the Battles with approval from the producers.

== Blind auditions ==
Color key

Coach pressed "I WANT YOU" button
Artist defaulted to a coach's team
Artist elected to pick a coach's team
Artist eliminated with no coach pressing their button

=== Episode 1 (November 12) ===
Order	Artist	Age	Hometown	Song	Coach's and artist's choices			
Order	Artist	Age	Hometown	Song	Kong	Da	Joey	Singto
1	Sirinthra Chanathap (Prang)	28	Bangkok	"เธอบอกให้ลืม"				—
2	Chalatphon Trinonglak	20	Chiang Mai	"Love On Top"	—	—	—	—
3	Wachirawit Chinkoet (Maimhon)	19	Mukdahan	"ฟ้าสูงหญ้าต่ำ"		—	—	
4	Wannalak Choikhlai	60	Bangkok	"น้ำเซาะทราย"	—	—	—	—
5	Phawida Moriggi (Silvy)	22	Phuket	"Ain't No Sunshine"				
6	Suriya Ruengsi (Add)	40	Chumphon	"Live and Learn"	—	—		—
7	Worabut Thawirutchana (Nini)	36	Bangkok	"Ju Hua Tai"			—	—
8	Ekkaphan Wannasut (Pure)	26	Roi Et	"Forget You"				

=== Episode 2 (November 19) ===
Order	Artist	Age	Hometown	Song	Coach's and artist's choices			
Order	Artist	Age	Hometown	Song	Kong	Da	Joey	Singto
1	Ratchada Kotkaeo (Nan)	20	Buriram	"เขียนฝันไว้ข้างฝา"		—	—	—
2	Valentina Giardullo (Ploy)	23	Torre del Greco / Bangkok	"In the End"	—	—		—
3	Phongthon Phaisanthanasuk (Bung) & Banthun Phothisomphot (Keaw)	39 & 38	Ratchaburi & Yala	"Mrs. Robinson"				
4	Chawin Punyasoni	23	Bangkok	"พยายาม"	—	—	—	—
5	Thammanun Pannaphinthu (Taotor)	25	Lopburi	"ร้ายก็รัก"	—	—		—
6	Panwet Saiyakhlai (Por)	33	Songkhla	"ดีที่สุดแล้ว"	—	—	—	
7	Bunyarit Charoenwong (Rotbus)	19	Chiang Mai	"เธอ"		—		
8	Pathitta Somkhanngoen (Preaw)	32	Bangkok	"วอนลมฝากรัก"				
9	Chonthichan Phuenhinlat	41	Chaiyaphum	"เจ้าหญิง"	—	—	—	—
10	Benjamin James Dolley (Ben)	32	Bangkok	"Good Bye"	—			

=== Episode 3 (November 26) ===
Order	Artist	Age	Hometown	Song	Coach's and artist's choices			
Order	Artist	Age	Hometown	Song	Kong	Da	Joey	Singto
1	Chumsin Raknaisin (Mon)	21	Chiang Mai	"Mind Trick"		—	—	
2	Chinda Wiriyasaengchan (Jim)	29	Nongkhai	"บางระจัน"		—	—	—
3	Chuthamat Sapsiri (Oil)	22	Lopburi	"อสงไขย"				
4	Rungsiri Kaeowichian (Natt) & Thinyakan Piakhong (Golffy)	28	Phra Nakhon Si Ayutthaya & Chumphon	"กรุณาฟังให้จบ"	—	—		—
5	Chanakan Sawatdimongkon (Karn)	19	Chonburi	"ฟั่นเฟือน"				—
6	Phonnapha Sisabong	16	Kalasin	"Listen"	—	—	—	—
7	Phichamon Lothong (Som)	30	Phra Nakhon Si Ayutthaya	"คู่คอง"	—		—	
8	Phawat Thongnoi	20	Phra Nakhon Si Ayutthaya	"ตุ๊กตา"	—	—	—	—
9	Kraiwit Phumsukho (Tom)	51	Bangkok	"See You Again"		—	—	
10	Chainarong Phrombuppha (Es)	37	Nakhon Ratchasima	"รักด้วยน้ำตา"			—	

=== Episode 4 (December 3) ===
Order	Artist	Age	Hometown	Song	Coach's and artist's choices			
Order	Artist	Age	Hometown	Song	Kong	Da	Joey	Singto
1	Wisuwat Prempri	30	Nonthaburi	"กลับมาทำไม"	—	—	—	—
2	Anuchit (Best) & Anucha (Boss) Panchamat	20	Roi Et	"คำแพง"		—	—	—
3	Saypaseuth Phommavongxay (Jacky)	18	Vientiane Prefecture	"พูดทำไม"	—	—	—	
4	Krittiya Ruchiphatchareon (Am)	25	Nonthaburi	"สนามอารมณ์"	—		—	
5	Ratthanan Sisotthiyodom (Prite)	16	Ratchaburi	"หน้าหนาวที่แล้ว"		—	—	—
6	Nawin Thaola (Noo)	41	Surin	"หนักใจ"	—		—	—
7	Onsu-ang Utchang	24	Nakhon Pathom	"ไว้ใจ๋ได้กา"	—	—	—	—
8	Kittiphong Phansaeng (Keng) & Kanthira Songprakhon (Kaofang)	20 & 26	Bangkok & Buriram	"We Don’t Talk Anymore"			—	—
9	Konkawat Sinlapi (Krit)	32	Bangkok	"รู้ไหมทําไม"	—	—		—
10	Satakhun Khongrit (Book)	34	Songkhla	"Say Anything"		—	—	
11	Yukonchat Ketphasa (Fay)	32	Bangkok	"ขอแค่ได้รู้"				

=== Episode 5 (December 10) ===
Order	Artist	Age	Hometown	Song	Coach's and artist's choices			
Order	Artist	Age	Hometown	Song	Kong	Da	Joey	Singto
1	Chaiyot Phromchareon (Ton)	19	Khon Kaen	"แพ้คำว่ารัก"	—		—	—
2	Siriman Wonghakhot	16	Mukdahan	"พรุ่งนี้จะไปกับเธอ"	—	—	—	—
3	Chitlada Thirinthong (Dear)	28	Bangkok	"Feel Like Makin' Love"	—	—		
4	Nonsi Phaitunwongwira (Nate)	23	Bangkok	"Autumn Leaves"	—		—	—
5	Chirawan Sonsa-atdi (Praew) ^{1}	28	Khon Kaen	"สุดท้ายที่กรุงเทพ"			—N/a	
6	Phira Chuen-arom (Prite)	27	Bangkok	"เจ้าสาวไฉไล"		—	—	—
7	Prat Cheoiklang (Tom)	43	Khon Kaen	"คนเก็บฟืน"	—	—		—
8	Hinano Chaiwirat (Kitty)	18	Bangkok	"Sakura"	—		—	—
9	Wanwisa Phama (Jene-jah)	22	Lopburi	"น้ำตาฟ้า"		—	—	—
10	Pharisa Santitranon	22	Phra Nakhon Si Ayutthaya	"North Star"	—	—	—	—
11	Suphakchaya Rattanamai (Ploy)	19	Phichit	"ตราบธุลีดิน"				

- ^1 Initially, no coaches turned for Chirawan Sonsa-atdi. However, Joey Boy requested that the producer give her a second chance, consequently making him unable to turn her down as he had already spoken with her.

=== Episode 6 (December 17) ===
Order	Artist	Age	Hometown	Song	Coach's and artist's choices			
Order	Artist	Age	Hometown	Song	Kong	Da	Joey	Singto
1	Rusichon Radatharanon (San)	30	Chiang Mai	"ยาใจคนจน"		—	—	—
2	Chanita Krathong (Ink)	25	Chonburi	"High & Dry"	—		—	—
3	Piyathida Lekklang (Maprang)	17	Nakhon Ratchasima	"Stay"	—		—	—
4	Chonlaphat Sestasittikul (EarnEarn)	18	Bangkok	"ม่านไทรย้อย"	—	—		—
5	Thiraphot Khamsikaeo	20	Ratchaburi	"วีนัส"	—	—	—	—
6	Patthama Marasi (Pat)	16	Bangkok	"ตะแลงแกงแทงใจ"	—	—	—	
7	Khanittha Baisakun (Google)	29	Prachuap Khiri Khan	"มุมมืด"	—		—	—
8	Phimphloi Phukanngam (PP)	23	Petchabun	"More Than I Can Say"	—	—	—	
9	Natthaphong Rungrueang	27	Phatthalung	"ลมเพลมพัด"	—	—	—	—
10	Edward Vanzo (Theu)	60	Bangkok	"Smoke On The Water"		—	—	
11	Saran Suyarat (Champ)	33	Chiang Mai	"รักเธอไม่มีหมด"	—	—		—

== The Knockouts ==
Color key:

Artist won the Knockouts and advanced to the Battles
Artist lost the Knockouts but was stolen by another coach and advanced to the Battles
Artist lost the Knockouts and was eliminated

Episode	Order	Coach	Song	Artists		Song	'Steal' result			
Episode	Order	Coach	Song	Winner	Loser	Song	Kong	Da	Joey	Singto
Episode 7 (Sunday, December 24)	1	Kong Saharat	"The Sound of Silence"	Phongthon (Bung) & Banthun (Keaw)	Chinda Wiriyasaengchan (Jin)	"บิน"	—N/a	—	—	—
Episode 7 (Sunday, December 24)	2	Singto Numchok	"เกือบ"	Saypaseuth Phommavongxay (Jacky)	Chumsin Raknaisin (Mon)	"Make It Mine"	—	—	—	—N/a
Episode 7 (Sunday, December 24)	3	Da Endorphine	"Only Love"	Worabut Thawirutchana (Nini)	Nawin Thaola (Noo)	"จะได้ไม่ลืมกัน"	—	—N/a		—
Episode 7 (Sunday, December 24)	4	Joey Boy	"กลับไปถามเมียดูก่อน"	Pathitta Somkhanngoen (Preaw)	Prat Cheoiklang (Tom)	"ซาอุดร"	—	—	—N/a	—
Episode 7 (Sunday, December 24)	5	Singto Numchok	"หนอนผีเสื้อ"	Bunyarit Charoenwong (Rotbus)	Phimphloi Phukanngam (PP)	"Don't Let Me Down"	—	—	—	—N/a
Episode 7 (Sunday, December 24)	6	Joey Boy	"ควันไฟ"	Phawida Moriggi (Silvy)	Konkawat Sinlapi (Krit)	"ยังจำไว้"	—		—N/a	—
Episode 8 (Sunday, January 7)	1	Joey Boy	"แพ้ใจ"	Valentina Giardullo (Ploy)	Suriya Ruengsi (Add)	"ก้อนหินก้อนนั้น"	—	—	—N/a	—
Episode 8 (Sunday, January 7)	2	Singto Numchok	"บันไดสีแดง"	Wachirawit Chinkoet (Maimhon)	Chirawan; Sonsa-atdi (Praew)	"อย่าพูดเลย"		—	—	—N/a
Episode 8 (Sunday, January 7)	3	Kong Saharat	"Stone Cold"	Yukonchat Ketphasa (Fay)	Edward Vanzo (Theu)	"Da Ya Think I'm Sexy?"	—N/a	—	—	—
Episode 8 (Sunday, January 7)	4	Joey Boy	"หนุ่มดอยเต่า"	Saran Suyarat (Champ)	Chanakan Sawatdimongkon (Karn)	"รอ"	—	—	—N/a	—
Episode 8 (Sunday, January 7)	5	Kong Saharat	"ลืมไปไม่รักกัน"	Chainarong Phrombuppha (Es)	Phira Chuen-arom (Prite)	"อยากบอกให้รู้"	—N/a	—	—	—
Episode 8 (Sunday, January 7)	6	Da Endorphine	"สุดฤทธิ์สุดเดช"	Suphakchaya Rattanamai (Ploy)	Phichamon; Lo-thong (Som)	"ประโยคบอกเล่า"	—	—N/a	—	—
Episode 9 (Sunday, January 14)	1	Kong Saharat	"ฉันเป็นของเธอ"	Sirinthra Chanathap (Prang)	Rusichon Radatharanon (San)	"แพ้คนสวย"	—N/a	—	—	—
Episode 9 (Sunday, January 14)	2	Singto Namchok	"กลัวความสูง"	Panwet Saiyakhlai (Por)	Satakhun Khongrit (Book)	"ยื้อ"	—	—		—N/a
Episode 9 (Sunday, January 14)	3	Da Endorphin	"I Feel It Coming"	Kittiphong (Keng) & Kanthira (Kaofang)	Chaiyot Phromchareon (Ton)	"เมื่อวาน"	—	—N/a	—	—
Episode 9 (Sunday, January 14)	4	Kong Saharat	"คืนที่ดาวเต็มฟ้า"	Anuchit (Best) & Anucha (Boss) Panchamat	Ratthanan Sisotthiyodom (Prite)	"Bad Luck"	—N/a	—		
Episode 9 (Sunday, January 14)	5	Joey Boy	"ใจรัก"	Chuthamat Sapsiri (Oil)	Thammanun Pannaphinthu (Taotor)	"ยอมรับคนเดียว"	—	—	Team full	—
Episode 9 (Sunday, January 14)	6	Da Endorphin	"You'll Never Walk Alone"	Benjamin James Dolley (Ben)	Khanittha Baisakun (Google)	"วันใหม่ (New Day)"		—N/a	Team full	—
Episode 10 (Sunday, January 21)	1	Da Endorphin	"เพียงรัก"	Piyathida Lekklang (Maprang)	Hinano Chaiwirat (Kitty)	"สักวันหนึ่ง"	Team full	—N/a	Team full	—
Episode 10 (Sunday, January 21)	2	Kong Saharat	"กลับคำสาหล่า"	Ratchada Kotkaeo (Nan)	Wanwisa Phama (Jane-jah)	"รอยไถแปร"	Team full	—	Team full	—
Episode 10 (Sunday, January 21)	3	Joey Boy	"The Girl In 14G"	Chonlaphat Sestasittikul (EarnEarn)	Rungsiri (Natt) & Thinyakan (Golffy)	"หัวใจคนรอ"	Team full	—	Team full	
Episode 10 (Sunday, January 21)	4	Singto Namchok	"เพียงครึ่งใจ"	Chitlada Thirinthong (Dear)	Patthama Marasi (Pat)	"Love"	Team full		Team full	Team full
Episode 10 (Sunday, January 21)	4	Singto Namchok	"เพียงครึ่งใจ"	Chitlada Thirinthong (Dear)	Krittiya Ruchiphatchareon (Am)	"เคยรักเธอหรือเปล่า"	Team full	Team full	Team full	Team full
Episode 10 (Sunday, January 21)	5	Da Endorphin	"Toxic"	Nonsi Phaitunwongwira (Nate)	Chanita Krathong (Ink)	"สายลม"	Team full	Team full	Team full	Team full
Episode 10 (Sunday, January 21)	6	Singto Namchok	"Man In The Mirror"	Ekkaphan Wannasut (Pure)	Kraiwit Phumsukho (Tom)	"Feeling Good"	Team full	Team full	Team full	Team full

== The Battles ==
– Artist won the Battles and advanced to the Live Playoffs
– Artist lost the Battles and was eliminated

Episode	Order	Coach	Winner	Song	Loser
Episode 11 (Sunday, January 28)	1	Kong Saharat	Chainarong Phrombuppha (Es)	"เสี่ยวรำพึง"	Anuchit (Best) & Anucha (Boss) Panchamat
Episode 11 (Sunday, January 28)	2	Da Endorphin	Suphakchaya Rattanamai (Ploy)	"รัก"	Worabut Thawirutchana (Nini)
Episode 11 (Sunday, January 28)	3	Singto Namchok	Saypaseuth Phommavongxay (Jacky)	"จิ๊บ ร.ด."	Ratthanan Sisotthiyodom (Prite)
Episode 11 (Sunday, January 28)	4	Joey Boy	Chonlaphat Sestasittikul (EarnEarn)	"Numb"	Satakhun Khongrit (Book)
Episode 11 (Sunday, January 28)	5	Da Endorphin	Piyathida Lekklang (Maprang)	"Dancing Queen"	Patthama Marasi (Pat)
Episode 11 (Sunday, January 28)	6	Kong Saharat	Yukonchat Ketphasa (Fay)	"ผิดมากไหม"	Khanittha Baisakun (Google)
Episode 11 (Sunday, January 28)	7	Joey Boy	Phawida Moriggi (Silvy)	"Hard To Say I'm Sorry"	Nawin Thaola (Noo)
Episode 11 (Sunday, January 28)	8	Singto Namchok	Wachirawit Chinkoet (Maimhon)	"ใจสั่งมา"	Bunyarit Charoenwong (Rotbus)
Episode 12 (Sunday, February 4)	1	Joey Boy	Chuthamat Sapsiri (Oil)	"จำกันบ่ได้กา"	Valentina Giardullo (Ploy)
Episode 12 (Sunday, February 4)	2	Kong Saharat	Chirawan Sonsa-atdi (Praew)	"ปลิว"	Ratchada Kotkaeo (Nan)
Episode 12 (Sunday, February 4)	3	Da Endorphin	Benjamin James Dolley (Ben)	"Stayin' Alive"	Konkawat Sinlapi (Krit)
Episode 12 (Sunday, February 4)	4	Singto Namchok	Chitlada Thirinthong (Dear)	"เราคงต้องเป็นแฟนกัน" / "เธอเป็นแฟนฉันแล้ว"	Panwet Saiyakhlai (Por)
Episode 12 (Sunday, February 4)	5	Da Endorphin	Kittiphong (Keng) & Kanthira (Kaofang)	"Get Lucky"	Nonsi Phaitunwongwira (Nate)
Episode 12 (Sunday, February 4)	6	Singto Namchok	Ekkaphan Wannasut (Pure)	"อมพระมาพูด"	Rungsiri (Natt) & Thinyakan (Golffy)
Episode 12 (Sunday, February 4)	7	Kong Saharat	Sirinthra Chanathap (Prang)	"เสมอ"	Phongthon (Bung) & Banthun (Keaw)
Episode 12 (Sunday, February 4)	8	Joey Boy	Pathitta Somkhanngoen (Preaw)	"จริง จริง"	—N/a (Note: Joey Boy chose both of them to advance as a duo with approval from the producers.)
Episode 12 (Sunday, February 4)	8	Joey Boy	Saran Suyarat (Champ)	"จริง จริง"	—N/a

== Live shows ==
=== Episode 13 & 14 : Live Shows (February 11 & 18) ===
Artist advanced to the Final by the Public's votes
Artist advanced to the Final by his/her coach
Artist was eliminated

Episode	Order	Coach	Artist	Song	Percentage	Result
Episode 13 (Sunday, February 11)	TV1	Kong Saharat	Chirawan Sonsa-atdi (Praew)	"ผู้ชายคนนี้กำลังหมดแรง"	23%	Eliminated
Episode 13 (Sunday, February 11)	TV2	Kong Saharat	Chainarong Phrombuppha (Es)	"อย่าให้เขารู้"	17%	Eliminated
Episode 13 (Sunday, February 11)	TV3	Kong Saharat	Yukonchat Ketphasa (Fay)	"เติมไม่เต็ม"	28%	Kong's choice
Episode 13 (Sunday, February 11)	TV4	Kong Saharat	Sirinthra Chanathap (Prang)	"ชัดเจน"	32%	Public's vote
Episode 13 (Sunday, February 11)	TV1	Joey Boy	Chuthamat Sapsiri (Oil)	"ลาก่อน"	3%	Eliminated
Episode 13 (Sunday, February 11)	TV2	Joey Boy	Chonlaphat Sestasittikul (EarnEarn)	"โลกใบใหญ่"	12%	Eliminated
Episode 13 (Sunday, February 11)	TV3	Joey Boy	Phawida Moriggi (Silvy)	"ใจเอย"	15%	Joey's choice
Episode 13 (Sunday, February 11)	TV4	Joey Boy	Pathitta (Preaw) & Saran (Champ)	"Dikir Puteri"	70%	Public's vote
Episode 14 (Sunday, February 18)	TV1	Da Endorphin	Kittiphong (Keng) & Kanthira (Kaofang)	"Can't Take My Eyes Off You"	7%	Eliminated
Episode 14 (Sunday, February 18)	TV2	Da Endorphin	Piyathida Lekklang (Maprang)	"แค่ได้คิดถึง"	11%	Eliminated
Episode 14 (Sunday, February 18)	TV3	Da Endorphin	Suphakchaya Rattanamai (Ploy)	"หัวใจมักง่าย"	39%	Da's choice
Episode 14 (Sunday, February 18)	TV4	Da Endorphin	Benjamin James Dolley (Ben)	"Home"	43%	Public's vote
Episode 14 (Sunday, February 18)	TV5	Singto Namchok	Chitlada Thirinthong (Dear)	"อยู่เพื่อตัวเอง"	6%	Eliminated
Episode 14 (Sunday, February 18)	TV6	Singto Namchok	Saypaseuth Phommavongxay (Jacky)	"ความฮู้สึกบอก (ຄວາມຮູ້ສຶກບອກ)"	14%	Eliminated
Episode 14 (Sunday, February 18)	TV7	Singto Namchok	Wachirawit Chinkoet (Maimhon)	"วันหนึ่งฉันเดินเข้าป่า (Into the Woods)"	48%	Public's vote
Episode 14 (Sunday, February 18)	TV8	Singto Namchok	Ekkaphan Wannasut (Pure)	"Run To You"	32%	Singto's choice

Non-competition performances
Order	Performer	Song
13.1	Team Kong Saharat	"While My Guitar Gently Weeps"
13.2	Team Joey Boy	"งานวัด"
14.1	Team Da Endorphin	"Like a Prayer"
14.2	Team Singto Namchok	"คนล่าฝัน"

=== Episode 15 : Final (February 25) ===
Order	Coach	Artist	Song	Percentage	Result
Group 1
TV1	Singto Namchok	Wachirawit Chinkoet (Maimhon)	"ลุงขี้เมา"	31%	Public's vote
TV2	Da Endorphin	Suphakchaya Rattanamai (Ploy)	"หัวใจทศกัณฐ์"	30%	Eliminated
TV3	Kong Saharat	Yukonchat Ketphasa (Fay)	"Crazy In Love"	14%	Eliminated
TV4	Singto Namchok	Ekkaphan Wannasut (Pure)	"Uptown Funk"	25%	Eliminated
Group 2
TV5	Joey Boy	Pathitta (Preaw) & Saran (Champ)	"พลิกล็อค"	26%	Eliminated
TV6	Kong Saharat	Sirinthra Chanathap (Prang)	"รักเธอสุดหัวใจ"	8%	Eliminated
TV7	Joey Boy	Phawida Moriggi (Silvy)	"Koisuru Fortune Cookie (Thai Version)"	8%	Eliminated
TV8	Da Endorphin	Benjamin James Dolley (Ben)	"Bohemian Rhapsody"	58%	Public's vote
Finale
TV1	Singto Namchok	Wachirawit Chinkoet (Maimhon)	"บันไดสีแดง"	55%	Winner
TV8	Da Endorphin	Benjamin James Dolley (Ben)	"You'll Never Walk Alone"	45%	Runner-up

Non-competition performance
Order	Performer	Song
15.1	Suchat Saehaeng, Tachaya Prathumwan and Rangsan Panyaruean	"การเดินทาง" / "ยังไงก็ไม่ยัก" / "โอ้เธอ"

== Elimination chart ==
Color key
Artist's info

- Team Kong
- Team Da

- Team Joey
- Team Singto

Result details

- Winner
- Runner-up

- Saved by the public
- Saved by his/her coach
- Eliminated

Weekly results per contestant
Contestant	Live Show	Final	
Contestant	Live Show	First round	Second round
Wachirawit Chinkoet (Maimhon)	1st 48%	1st 31%	1st 55%
Benjamin James Dolley (Ben)	1st 43%	1st 58%	2nd 45%
Suphakchaya Rattanamai (Ploy)	2nd 39%	2nd 30%	Eliminated
Pathitta (Preaw) & Saran (Champ)	1st 70%	2nd 26%	Eliminated
Ekkaphan Wannasut (Pure)	2nd 32%	3rd 25%	Eliminated
Sirinthra Chanathap (Prang)	1st 32%	3rd 8%	Eliminated
Phawida Moriggi (Silvy)	2nd 15%	3rd 8%	Eliminated
Yukonchat Ketphasa (Fay)	2nd 28%	4th 14%	Eliminated
Chirawan Sonsa-atdi (Praew)	3rd 23%	Eliminated	
Chainarong Phrombuppha (Es)	4th 17%	Eliminated	
Chonlaphat Sestasittikul (EarnEarn)	3rd 12%	Eliminated	
Chuthamat Sapsiri (Oil)	4th 3%	Eliminated	
Piyathida Lekklang (Maprang)	3rd 11%	Eliminated	
Kittiphong (Keng) & Kanthira (Kaofang)	4th 7%	Eliminated	
Saypaseuth Phommavongxay (Jacky)	3rd 14%	Eliminated	
Chitlada Thirinthong (Dear)	4th 6%	Eliminated	
