= The Voice Thailand season 5 =

The Voice Thailand
- Season 5
- Hosted by: Songsit Rungnopphakhunsi; Rinrani Siphen
- Coaches: Saharat Sangkapreecha; Thanida Dhammawimol; Joey Boy; Namchok Natanrom

Release
- Original network: Channel 3
- Original release: 11 September 2016 – 5 February 2017

Season chronology
- ← Previous; Season 4 Next → Season 6

The fifth series of The Voice เสียงจริงตัวจริง ( also known as The Voice Thailand ) on 11 September 2016. The show was hosted by Songsit Rungnopphakhunsi and Rinrani Siphen on Channel 3. The show was temporarily postponed due to King Bhumibol's death, delaying the 6th episode until 20 November 2016.

== Teams ==
Colour key

Winner
Runner-up
Third place

- Eliminated in the Live Playoffs
- Eliminated in the Knockout
- Stolen in the Battle Round
- Eliminated in the Battle Round

Coaches	Top 51 artists			
Kong Saharat
Kong Saharat	Anon Watchariwong na Ayutthaya	Thamonwan Koplapthanakun	Thakon Choengkhunthot	Methasit Wangdi
Kong Saharat	Narongchai Chatkrabuanphon	Raphiphon Kaeophloi	Sheena Asama McKency	Sumano Prathipsukchareon
Kong Saharat	~~Siphum Bencharat~~	~~Witthawat Sankonkit~~	Anuthin Sakdasirikun	Bulakon Netsombun
Kong Saharat	Chaiyawat Sithong	Nongnut Chaikhong	Phatcharin Suthiraniphanphon	
Da Endorphin
Da Endorphin	Natthapong Thongmueang	Opkhwan Kinglakmueang	Bancha Khamluecha	Chonchanok Tatiyongmongkhonchai
Da Endorphin	Chuthathip Sumanat	Joseph Zamudio	Matchima Mibamrung	Phisan Nonsung
Da Endorphin	~~Phatcharaphong Bunchu~~	~~Sheena Asama McKency~~	Athisan Chuenwut	Chakkrit Butsi
Da Endorphin	Kotchakon Hinthong	Natcha Thathong	Utsani Rakthai	
Joey Boy
Joey Boy	Siphum Bencharat	Noppharut Simuang	Witthawat Sankonkit	Phirachat Suwatthawichai
Joey Boy	Ditthawat Chaikaeoruchikorn	Kanticha Thitithada	Phacharaphan Sutthanon	Thanaphon Mahathon
Joey Boy	~~Chuthathip Sumanat~~	~~Krit & Chaninat Sirisawat~~	Atthaphon Konchaiya	Natthanon Saechao
Joey Boy	Phawin Rattanasawettakun	Sinlapin Gill		
Singto Namchok
Singto Namchok	Phatcharaphong Bunchu	Kittiwat Rungrueng	Natthanot Chunhakan	Phiraphat Sitthawong
Singto Namchok	Charinthon Samngamkhiao	Krit & Chaninat Sirisawat	Rie Kubota	Thitiphon Bangkhomkhun
Singto Namchok	~~Bancha Khamluecha~~	~~Raphiphon Kaeophloi~~	Benchamat Chumtrinok	Matchima Somtua
Singto Namchok	Niramit Bokhunthot	Phatcharin Chareonphong	Phraeonapha Sukkharangsan	
Singto Namchok	Note:Italicized names are stolen contestants (names struck through within former teams)			

== The Blind Auditions ==
Key	Coach hit his/her "I WANT YOU" button	Artist eliminated with no coach pressing his or her "I WANT YOU" button	Artist defaulted to this coach's team	Artist elected to join this coach's team

=== Episode 1: Blind Auditions, Week 1 ===
The first blind audition episode was broadcast on 11 September 2016.

Order	Contestant	Song	Coaches' and Contestants' Choices			
Order	Contestant	Song	Kong	Da	Joey	Singto
1	Benchamat Chumtrinok _{31, Surin}	"ปล่อย"		—	—	
2	Thakon Choengkhunthot _{28, Nakhon Ratchasima}	"Let's Stay Together"				
3	Natcha Thathong _{24, Ubon Ratchathani}	"Daydreamer"				
4	Monthicha Buttanu _{21, Sa Kaeo}	"คิดถึง"	—	—	—	—
5	Chuthathip Sumanat _{31, Kalasin}	"ตัวร้ายที่รักเธอ"	—	—		
6	Phirachat Suwatthawichai _{20, Bangkok}	"วัดใจ"		—		
7	Thitiphon Bangkhomkhun _{22, Bangkok}	"Lego House"			—	
8	Natthaphong Thongmueang _{31, Bangkok}	"ผิดที่ไว้ใจ"			—	

=== Episode 2: Blind Auditions, Week 2 ===
The second blind audition episode was broadcast on 18 September 2016.

Order	Contestant	Song	Coaches' and Contestants' Choices			
Order	Contestant	Song	Kong	Da	Joey	Singto
1	Sanruethai Phalinbodinchai _{59, Bangkok}	"ก้อนหินก้อนนั้น"	—	—	—	—
2	Natthanot Chunhakan _{34, Ubon Ratchathani}	"Rehab"				
3	Methasit Wangdi _{22, Bangkok}	"จดหมายฉบับสุดท้าย"		—	—	
4	Narongchai Chatkrabuanphon _{32, Bangkok}	"Sweet Home Chicago"		—	—	—
5	Sinlapin Gill _{21, Bangkok}	"Airplanes"	—	—		—
6	Traiphop Lao-udom _{24, Bangkok}	"รางวัล"	—	—	—	—
7	Bancha Khamluecha _{26, Rayong}	"Live & Learn"				
8	Kittiwat Rungrueng _{26, Prachuap Khiri Khan}	"แผลในใจ"		—	—	
9	Phatcharaphong Bunchu _{21, Chanthaburi}	"คนที่ฆ่าฉัน"	—		—	
10	Phimchit Phuengphanit _{17, Trang}	"Puff, the Magic Dragon"	—	—	—	—
11	Witthawat Sankonkit _{26, Chiang Mai}	"Highway to Hell"		—		

=== Episode 3: Blind Auditions, Week 3 ===
The third blind audition episode was broadcast on 25 September 2016.

Order	Contestant	Song	Coaches' and Contestants' Choices			
Order	Contestant	Song	Kong	Da	Joey	Singto
1	Sasisak Dokphut _{34, Krabi}	"รักเดียวใจเดียว"	—	—	—	—
2	Siphum Bencharat _{27, Prachuap Khiri Khan}	"I Put A Spell On You"		—	—	—
3	Phiraphat Sittawong _{23, Udon Thani}	"กรุณาฟังให้จบ"			—	
4	Matchima Mibamrung _{21, Bangkok}	"ฉันจะฝันถึงเธอ"			—	—
5	Yanisa Kaisut _{20, Nonthaburi}	"เธอคือของขวัญ"	—	—	—	—
6	Natthanon Saechao _{21, Nonthaburi}	"สุขกันเถอะเรา"	—	—		—
7	Phatcharin Charoenphong _{25, Bangkok}	"All About That Bass"	—		—	
8	Sumano Prathipsukchareon _{33, Bangkok}	"สรุปว่าบ้า"		—	—	
9	Chonchanok Tatiyongmongkhonchai _{17, Nakhon Ratchasima}	"อยู่อย่างเหงา ๆ"			—	—
10	Phisan Nonsung _{29, Nakhon Ratchasima}	"Enter Sandman"				
11	Noppharut Si-muang _{22, Songkhla}	"คำสุดท้าย"	—			

=== Episode 4: Blind Auditions, Week 4 ===
The fourth blind audition episode was broadcast on 2 October 2016.

Order	Contestant	Song	Coaches' and Contestants' Choices			
Order	Contestant	Song	Kong	Da	Joey	Singto
1	Wiraphat Lamthanthong & Natthaphong Lamthanthong _{23 & 18, Songkhla}	"เธอที่รัก"	—	—	—	—
2	Chaiyawat Si-thong _{22, Bangkok}	"2-1=0"		—	—	—
3	Thamonwan Koplapthanakun _{18, Nakhon Ratchasima}	"คนไม่มีเวลา"		—		
4	Atthaphon Konchaiya _{43, Nonthaburi}	"Lady Bump"				
5	Patthralekha Kanchanasirirat _{27, Roi Et}	"ทำใจลำบาก"	—	—	—	—
6	Phatcharin Suthiraniphanphon _{33, Bangkok}	"ผ้าเช็ดหน้า"			—	—
7	Thanaphon Mahathon _{27, Bangkok}	"Nothin' On You"	—			—
8	Kanticha Thitithada _{25, Chonburi}	"ร้องไห้ง่ายง่ายกับเรื่องเดิมเดิม"				
9	Athisan Chuenwut _{32, Nonthaburi}	"คนขี้เหงา"			—	—
10	Charinthon Samngamkhiao _{28, Nakhon Sawan}	"โลกของผึ้ง"		—		
11	Joseph Zamudio _{31, Bangkok}	"Besame Mucho"			—	

=== Episode 5: Blind Auditions, Week 5 ===
The fifth blind audition episode was broadcast on 9 October 2016.

Order	Contestant	Song	Coaches' and Contestants' Choices			
Order	Contestant	Song	Kong	Da	Joey	Singto
1	Chakkrit Butsi _{27, Bangkok}	"Dancing On My Own"	—		—	—
2	Bulakon Netsombun _{38, Chiang Mai}	"นับหนึ่ง"		—	—	—
3	Sheena Asama McKency _{19, Bangkok}	"รักไม่ยอมเปลี่ยนแปลง"	—		—	—
4	Rie Kubota _{18, Lamphun}	"Be Honest"			—	
5	Kulitsara Charua-angsuthon _{19, Bangkok}	"Sunday Morning"	—	—	—	—
6	Paphanaphat Chokthanasetkun _{28, Ubon Ratchathani}	"ล่ำบึ้ก"	—	—	—	—
7	Matchima Somtua _{48, Rayong}	"ไม่เคย"	—	—	—	
8	Phawin Rattanasawettakun _{29, Chiang Mai}	"Don't Look Back In Anger"	—	—		—
9	Anon Watchariwong na Ayutthaya _{28, Bangkok}	"ไม่อยากหลับตา"		—	—	—
10	Raphiphon Kaeo-phloi _{31, Bangkok}	"Arthur's Theme"		—	—	
11	Ditthawat Chaikaeo-ruchikon _{35, Chiang Mai}	"Cha-La Head-Cha-La"				

=== Episode 6: Blind Auditions, Week 6 ===
The sixth blind audition episode was broadcast on 20 November 2016.

Order	Contestant	Song	Coaches' and Contestants' Choices			
Order	Contestant	Song	Kong	Da	Joey	Singto
1	Sitthichai Latkaeo _{28, Chonburi}	"ปลายทาง"	—	—	—	—
2	Nongnut Chaikhong _{33, Lampang}	"แค่เสียใจ ไม่พอ"		—	—	—
3	Krit Sirisawat & Chaninat Sirisawat _{18 & 16, Chiang Mai}	"เธอ"	—	—		—
4	Utsani Rakthai _{20, Nonthaburi}	"Boyfriend"	—		—	
5	Phraeo-napha Sukkharangsan _{16, Chiang Mai}	"Almost Is Never Enough"	—	—	—	
6	Niramit Bo-khunthot _{35, Nakhon Ratchasima}	"ครึ่งใจ"	—	—	—	
7	Kotchakon Hinthong _{27, Nakhon Ratchasima}	"กอด"	—			—
8	Anuthin Sakdasirikun _{25, Samut Prakan}	"คืนจันทร์"		—	—	—
9	Phacharaphan Sutthanon _{24, Chanthaburi}	"ทำไมถึงทำกับฉันได้"	—	—		
10	Opkhwan Kinglakmueang _{16, Khon Kaen}	"ฉันดีใจที่มีเธอ"	—			—

== The Battles ==
The Battles started with episode 7 and ended with episode 10 (broadcast on 27 November, 4, 11, 18 December 2016). The coaches can steal two losing artists from another coach. Contestants who win their battle or are stolen by another coach will advance to the Knockouts.

Color key:

Artist won the Battles and advanced to the Knockouts
Artist lost the Battles but was stolen by another coach and advanced to the Knockouts
Artist lost the Battles and was eliminated

Episode	Order	Coach	Winner	Song	Loser	'Steal' result			
Episode	Order	Coach	Winner	Song	Loser	Kong	Da	Joey	Singto
Episode 7 (27 November 2016)	1	Kong Saharat	Sumano Prathipsukchareon	"โกหก"	Phatcharin Suthiraniphanphon	—	—	—	—
Episode 7 (27 November 2016)	2	Da Endorphin	Chonchanok Tatiyongmongkhonchai	"เพื่อนรัก"	Sheena Asama McKency		—	—	—
Episode 7 (27 November 2016)	3	Singto Namchok	Kittiwat Rungrueng	"ทนได้ทุกที"	Niramit Bo-khunthot	—	—	—	—
Episode 7 (27 November 2016)	4	Joey Boy	Ditthawat Chaikaeo-ruchikon	"เพื่ออะไร"	Atthaphon Konchaiya	—	—	—	—
Episode 7 (27 November 2016)	5	Da Endorphin	Natthapong Thongmueang	"อีกหน่อยเธอคงเข้าใจ"	Athisan Chuenwut	—	—	—	—
Episode 7 (27 November 2016)	6	Kong Saharat	Thakon Choengkhunthot	"แทงข้างหลัง..ทะลุถึงหัวใจ"	Siphum Bencharat	—			
Episode 8 (4 December 2016)
Episode 8 (4 December 2016)	1	Da Endorphin	Matchima Mibamrung	"Firework"	Natcha Thathong	—	—	—	—
Episode 8 (4 December 2016)	2	Singto Namchok	Charinthon Samngamkhiao	"น้ำตาหล่นบนที่นอน"	Benchamat Chumtrinok	—	—	—	—
Episode 8 (4 December 2016)	3	Kong Saharat	Narongchai Chatkrabuanphon	"Born to Be Wild"	Witthawat Sankonkit	—	—		—
Episode 8 (4 December 2016)	4	Joey Boy	Kanticha Thitithada	"รักที่เพิ่งผ่านพ้นไป"	Chuthathip Sumanat	—		—	—
Episode 8 (4 December 2016)	5	Joey Boy	Noppharut Simuang	"นิทานโลกสวย"	Krit & Chaninat Sirisawat	—	—	—	
Episode 9 (11 December 2016)
Episode 9 (11 December 2016)	1	Kong Saharat	Methasit Wangdi	"ไอ้หนุ่มผมยาว"	Anuthin Sakdasirikun	—	—	Team full	—
Episode 9 (11 December 2016)	2	Singto Namchok	Phiraphat Sittawong	"ช่วงที่ดีที่สุด"	Matchima Somtua	—	—	Team full	—
Episode 9 (11 December 2016)	3	Da Endorphin	Opkhwan Kinglakmueang	"Domino"	Utsani Rakthai	—	—	Team full	—
Episode 9 (11 December 2016)	4	Kong Saharat	Anon Watchariwong na Ayutthaya	"หลบไปให้พ้น"	Chaiyawat Si-thong	—	—	Team full	—
Episode 9 (11 December 2016)	4	Kong Saharat	Anon Watchariwong na Ayutthaya	"หลบไปให้พ้น"	Bulakon Netsombun	—	—	Team full	—
Episode 9 (11 December 2016)	5	Singto Namchok	Natthanot Chunhakan	"Hold My Hand"	Phatcharin Charoenphong	—	—	Team full	—
Episode 9 (11 December 2016)	6	Joey Boy	Phirachat Suwatthawichai	"ฉันมาไกล"	Phawin Rattanasawettakun	—	—	Team full	—
Episode 9 (11 December 2016)	7	Singto Namchok	Thitiphon Bangkhomkhun	"เราและนาย"	Bancha Khamluecha	—		Team full	—
Episode 10 (18 December 2016)
Episode 10 (18 December 2016)	1	Joey Boy	Phacharaphan Sutthanon	"หวงรัก" / "ฉันก็รักของฉัน"	Natthanon Saechao	—	Team full	Team full	—
Episode 10 (18 December 2016)	2	Kong Saharat	Thamonwan Koplapthanakun	"เปลี่ยน"	Nongnut Chaikhong	—	Team full	Team full	—
Episode 10 (18 December 2016)	3	Singto Namchok	Rie Kubota	"What Can I Do"	Raphiphon Kaeo-phloi		Team full	Team full	—
Episode 10 (18 December 2016)	3	Singto Namchok	Rie Kubota	"What Can I Do"	Phraeo-napha Sukkharangsan	Team full	Team full	Team full	—
Episode 10 (18 December 2016)	4	Da Endorphin	Joseph Zamudio	"เพื่อเธอตลอดไป"	Kotchakon Hinthong	Team full	Team full	Team full	—
Episode 10 (18 December 2016)	5	Joey Boy	Thanaphon Mahathon	"ใครไม่เกี่ยวถอยไป"	Sinlapin Gill	Team full	Team full	Team full	—
Episode 10 (18 December 2016)	6	Da Endorphin	Phisan Nonsung	"ตาสว่าง"	Chakkrit Butsi	Team full	Team full	Team full	—
Episode 10 (18 December 2016)	6	Da Endorphin	Phisan Nonsung	"ตาสว่าง"	Phatcharaphong Bunchu	Team full	Team full	Team full	

== The Knockouts ==
Color key:

Artist won the Knockouts and advances to the Live shows
Artist lost the Knockouts and was eliminated

Episode	Coach	Order	Artist	Song	Result
Episode 11 (8 January 2017)	Kong Saharat	1	Anon Watchariwong na Ayutthaya	"เพราะเธอหรือเปล่า"	Advanced
Episode 11 (8 January 2017)	Kong Saharat	2	Raphiphon Kaeo-phloi	"Hello"	Eliminated
Episode 11 (8 January 2017)	Kong Saharat	3	Thamonwan Koplapthanakun	"ไม่มีใครรู้"	Advanced
Episode 11 (8 January 2017)	Kong Saharat	4	Narongchai Chatkrabuanphon	"Still Got The Blues"	Eliminated
Episode 11 (8 January 2017)	Singto Namchok	1	Krit & Chaninat Sirisawat	"Take Me Home"	Eliminated
Episode 11 (8 January 2017)	Singto Namchok	2	Natthanot Chunhakan	"ไก่จ๋า"	Advanced
Episode 11 (8 January 2017)	Singto Namchok	3	Rie Kubota	"Subaru" / "ดาวประดับใจ"	Eliminated
Episode 11 (8 January 2017)	Singto Namchok	4	Phiraphat Sittawong	"หนุ่มน้อย"	Advanced
Episode 11 (8 January 2017)	Da Endorphin	1	Bancha Khamluecha	"ยังรอคอยเธอเสมอ"	Advanced
Episode 11 (8 January 2017)	Da Endorphin	2	Chonchanok Tatiyongmongkhonchai	"Stay With Me"	Advanced
Episode 11 (8 January 2017)	Da Endorphin	3	Matchima Mibamrung	"มีแต่คิดถึง"	Eliminated
Episode 11 (8 January 2017)	Da Endorphin	4	Joseph Zamudio	"ถ้าปล่อยให้เธอผ่าน"	Eliminated
Episode 11 (8 January 2017)	Joey Boy	1	Noppharut Simuang	"ดอกไม้พลาสติก"	Advanced
Episode 11 (8 January 2017)	Joey Boy	2	Kanticha Thitithada	"คิดถึงเธอทุกที (ที่อยู่คนเดียว)"	Eliminated
Episode 11 (8 January 2017)	Joey Boy	3	Ditthawat Chaikaeo-ruchikon	"Hahauesama Ogenki Desuka"	Eliminated
Episode 11 (8 January 2017)	Joey Boy	4	Siphum Bencharat	"เพราะฉะนั้น"	Advanced
Episode 12 (15 January 2017)	Da Endorphin	1	Opkhwan Kinglakmueang	"พรหมลิขิต"	Advanced
Episode 12 (15 January 2017)	Da Endorphin	2	Chuthathip Sumanat	"วอน"	Eliminated
Episode 12 (15 January 2017)	Da Endorphin	3	Natthapong Thongmueang	"ทบทวน"	Advanced
Episode 12 (15 January 2017)	Da Endorphin	4	Phisan Nonsung	"รอรับได้เลย"	Eliminated
Episode 12 (15 January 2017)	Kong Saharat	1	Methasit Wangdi	"ทหารพิการรัก"	Advanced
Episode 12 (15 January 2017)	Kong Saharat	2	Thakon Choengkhunthot	"เติมไม่เต็ม"	Advanced
Episode 12 (15 January 2017)	Kong Saharat	3	Sheena Asama McKency	"The Day You Went Away"	Eliminated
Episode 12 (15 January 2017)	Kong Saharat	4	Sumano Prathipsukchareon	"ลาออก"	Eliminated
Episode 12 (15 January 2017)	Joey Boy	1	Phacharaphan Sutthanon	"คิดถึงเธอ"	Eliminated
Episode 12 (15 January 2017)	Joey Boy	2	Witthawat Sankonkit	"Ooh!"	Advanced
Episode 12 (15 January 2017)	Joey Boy	3	Phirachat Suwatthawichai	"รักไม่ช่วยอะไร"	Advanced
Episode 12 (15 January 2017)	Joey Boy	4	Thanaphon Mahathon	"ตัวสำรอง"	Eliminated
Episode 12 (15 January 2017)	Singto Namchok	1	Thitiphon Bangkhomkhun	"ไม่มี"	Eliminated
Episode 12 (15 January 2017)	Singto Namchok	2	Charinthon Samngamkhiao	"ทางเดินแห่งรัก"	Eliminated
Episode 12 (15 January 2017)	Singto Namchok	3	Phatcharaphong Bunchu	"สิ่งที่เธอขาด"	Advanced
Episode 12 (15 January 2017)	Singto Namchok	4	Kittiwat Rungrueng	"กันและกัน"	Advanced

== Live Shows ==
=== Episode 13: Live Playoffs Week 1 (22 January) ===
Advanced
Eliminated

Winner
Runner-up
Third Place
Fourth Place

Order	Coach	Artist	Song	Score			Result
Order	Coach	Artist	Song	Coach	Voting	Total	Result
TV1	Da Endorphin	Chonchanok Tatiyongmongkhonchai	"Set Fire to the Rain"	5%	1%	6%	Eliminated
TV2	Da Endorphin	Bancha Khamluecha	"เธอคือความฝัน"	10%	2%	12%	Eliminated
TV3	Da Endorphin	Opkhwan Kinglakmueang	"พี่ชายที่แสนดี"	20%	7%	27%	Eliminated
TV4	Da Endorphin	Natthapong Thongmueang	"กาลครั้งหนึ่ง"	15%	40%	55%	Advanced
TV5	Singto Namchok	Phiraphat Sittawong	"หัวใจสะออน"	5%	2%	7%	Eliminated
TV6	Singto Namchok	Natthanot Chunhakan	"รักกันมั้ย"	10%	3%	13%	Eliminated
TV7	Singto Namchok	Kittiwat Rungrueng	"คนดีไม่มีวันตาย"	20%	14%	34%	Eliminated
TV8	Singto Namchok	Phatcharaphong Bunchu	"เช้าไม่กลัว"	15%	31%	46%	Advanced

Non-competition performances
Order	Artist	Song
13.1	Artist of The Voice	"รูปที่มีทุกบ้าน"
13.2	Team Da	"ผ่าน"
13.3	Team Singto	"เมดเล่ย์ลูกทุ่ง" (หัวใจผมว่าง/ชวนน้องแต่งงาน/อย่าปล่อยให้เธอลอยนวล)

=== Episode 14: Live Playoffs Week 2 (29 January) ===
Advanced
Eliminated

Winner
Runner-up
Third Place
Fourth Place

Order	Coach	Artist	Song	Score			Result
Order	Coach	Artist	Song	Coach	Voting	Total	Result
TV1	Kong Saharat	Thakon Choengkhunthot	"Lay Me Down"	15%	5%	20%	Eliminated
TV2	Kong Saharat	Methasit Wangdi	"Too Much So Much Very Much"	5%	7%	12%	Eliminated
TV3	Kong Saharat	Thamonwan Koplapthanakun	"ไม้ขีดไฟกับดอกทานตะวัน"	10%	14%	24%	Eliminated
TV4	Kong Saharat	Anon Watchariwong na Ayutthaya	"เธอ...ผู้ไม่แพ้"	20%	24%	44%	Advanced
TV5	Joey Boy	Phirachat Suwatthawichai	"อย่าหยุดยั้ง"	5%	4%	9%	Eliminated
TV6	Joey Boy	Noppharut Simuang	"แสนรัก"	15%	12%	27%	Eliminated
TV7	Joey Boy	Siphum Bencharat	"อีกนาน"	20%	18%	38%	Advanced
TV8	Joey Boy	Witthawat Sankonkit	"Welcome to the Jungle"	10%	16%	26%	Eliminated

Non-competition performances
Order	Artist	Song
14.1	Boyd Kosiyabong and Artist of The Voice	"The Voice Hall of Fame"
14.2	Team Kong	"Stairway to Heaven"
14.3	Team Joey	"ถึงเพื่อนเรา"

=== Episode 15: Finals (5 February) ===
Winner
Runner-up
Third Place

Coach	Artist	Order	Duet Song (With coach)	Order	Solo Song	Result
Kong Saharat	Anon Watchariwong na Ayutthaya	1	"ตะกายดาว"	6	"แสงสุดท้าย"	Third place
Joey Boy	Siphum Bencharat	2	"เพื่อนกับพ่อ"	8	"ทั้งรักทั้งเกลียด"	Winner
Da Endorphin	Natthapong Thongmueang	3	"สิ่งสำคัญ"	5	"ฤดูร้อน"	Runner-up
Singto Namchok	Phatcharaphong Bunchu	4	"อยู่ต่อเลยได้ไหม _{เวอร์ชัน ไลออน คิง}"	7	"วันนี้เมื่อปีก่อน (Today, Last Year)"	Third place

Non-competition performances
Order	Artist	Song
15.1	Pongsit Kamphee	"The Voice Hall of Fame"
