= The Voice Thailand season 4 =

The Voice Thailand
- Season 4
- Hosted by: Songsit Rungnopphakhunsi; Rinrani Siphen
- Coaches: Saharat Sangkapreecha; Jennifer Kim; Joey Boy; Namchok Natanrom
- Winner: Thitthinan Onpan
- Runner-up: Anchuli-on Buakaeo

Release
- Original network: Channel 3
- Original release: 6 September – 13 December 2015

Season chronology
- ← Previous; Season 3 Next → Season 5

The fourth series of The Voice เสียงจริงตัวจริง ( also known as The Voice Thailand ) on 6 September 2015. The show was hosted by Songsit Rungnopphakhunsi and Rinrani Siphen on Channel 3.

== Teams ==
Colour key

- Winner
- Runners-up
- Third place
- Fourth place
- Eliminated in the Live shows
- Eliminated in the Knockouts
- Artist was stolen by another coach in the Battle rounds (Name is strike-throughed)
- Eliminated in the Battles

Coach	Top 50				
Kong Saharat					
Kong Saharat	Anchuli-on Buakaeo	Chiranan Phanthuwon	Phatthranut Sitawan	Bunyaphon Bunlom	Thanyanan Thongsithanaphong
Kong Saharat	Phitsanu Chaiyarot	Wasin Wongpatham & Bandit Phraibueng	Ketsirinphat Charanyawat	Thanida Hiranyaphruek	Natnicha Chuangsamrong
Kong Saharat	Phakhawat Songkrot	Neti Chedi	~~Phatthra Warinthrawet~~	~~Oranat Yuenyonghatthaphon~~	-
Jennifer Kim					
Jennifer Kim	Samat Niamsa-at	Manatsanan Aksonthueng	Narat-hathai Warotamaphat	Watcharaphong Sirirak	Phonbancha Maikantha
Jennifer Kim	Phloiphailin Hannok	Nattha Intasao	Pratchayaphon Phoemphun	Anyamani Mangmi	Benchaphon Sawatprathan
Jennifer Kim	Phloiphailin Phola	Wachirat Wannawichit	Lueaksan Patchimkantrong	Thanakon Hanabut	Chulalak Itthisukkhanan
Jennifer Kim	~~Phatthranut Sitawan~~	-	-	-	-
Joey Boy					
Joey Boy	Thitthinan Onpan	Rungrat Mengphanit	Naraphong Pramot	Yada Komet	Inthira Morales
Joey Boy	Suchittra Thotankham	Natthaphan Uthai	Phatthra Warinthrawet	Kanyaphak Khan	Phiraphat Suepsombat
Joey Boy	Chatuphot Siwong	Chatuphot Sinlapachon & Sutthichat San-at	~~Ratchayawi Wirasutthimat~~	~~Nattha Intasao~~	-
Singto Namchok					
Singto Namchok	Phongthon Pathumanon	Ratchayawi Wirasutthimat	Phitsini Wirasutthimat	Ardawan Habibzadeh	Renprawit Phongphatthrawichit
Singto Namchok	Namfon Phakdi	Anucha Maro	Oranat Yuenyonghatthaphon	Kitikhun Kriangkraiphet	Thanaphon Kittirattanaseni
Singto Namchok	Charin Laocharoen	~~Naraphong Pramot~~	~~Pratchayaphon Phoemphun~~	~~Ketsirinphat Charanyawat~~	-

== The Blind Auditions ==
=== Episode 1: Blind Auditions, Week 1 ===
The first blind audition episode was broadcast on 6 September 2015.

Group performance: The voice Thailand's Coach –

Key	Coach hit his/her "I WANT YOU" button	Artist eliminated with no coach pressing his or her "I WANT YOU" button	Artist defaulted to this coach's team	Artist elected to join this coach's team

Order	Contestant	Song	Coaches' and Contestants' Choices			
Order	Contestant	Song	Kong	Kim	Joey	Singto
1	Thanyanan Thongsithanaphong _{29, from Ubon Ratchathani}	"รักคือ"				
2	Anyamani Mangmi _{18, from Nonthaburi}	"พรุ่งนี้ไม่สาย"	—		—	—
3	Namfon Phakdi _{35, from Bangkok}	"อีกสักครั้ง"		—		
4	Inthira Morales _{18, from Udon Thani}	"กระแซะเข้ามาซิ"	—	—		—
5	Phonbancha Maikantha _{29, from Lampang}	"ยังจำได้ไหม"			—	—
6	Nueang Mahayothi _{29, from Surin}	"ยาม"	—	—	—	—
7	Neti Chedi _{30, from Nakhon Nayok}	"รักเธอเสมอ"		—	—	—
8	Anchuli-on Buakaeo _{49, from Bangkok}	"Summertime"		—		—
9	Ariya Kanniyom _{25, from Chiang Mai}	"ไว้ใจได้กา"	—	—	—	—
10	Yada Komet _{25, from Bangkok}	"Good Times"				

=== Episode 2: Blind Auditions, Week 2 ===
The second blind audition episode was broadcast on 13 September 2015.

Key	Coach hit his/her "I WANT YOU" button	Artist eliminated with no coach pressing his or her "I WANT YOU" button	Artist defaulted to this coach's team	Artist elected to join this coach's team

Order	Contestant	Song	Coaches' and Contestants' Choices			
Order	Contestant	Song	Kong	Kim	Joey	Singto
1	Thanaphon Kittirattanaseni _{26, from Bangkok}	"Don't Know Why"				
2	Sirinda Setthalila _{21, from Bangkok}	"รักเดียวใจเดียว"	—	—	—	—
3	Nattha Intasao _{20, from Rayong}	"รักทรหด"		—		
4	Phatthranut Sitawan _{26, from Sukhothai}	"ขวัญใจเจ้าทุย"			—	—
5	Benchaphon Sawatprathan _{25, from Nonthaburi}	"พูดไม่คิด"			—	—
6	Chirayut Chirathanawit _{39, from Nonthaburi}	"อย่าหยุดยั้ง"	—	—	—	—
7	Wasin Wongpatham & Bandit Phraibueng _{31 and 30, from Bangkok}	"กลิ่น"		—	—	—
8	Natthawut Wibunchak _{25, from Bangkok}	"ทั้งรู้ก็รัก"	—	—	—	—
9	Kitikhun Kriangkraiphet _{25, from Nakhon Sawan}	"Don't"		—	—	
10	Phitsini Wirasutthimat _{24, from Bangkok}	"กลับมา"	—	—		
11	Ratchayawi Wirasutthimat _{25, from Bangkok}	"Funhouse"	—	—		

=== Episode 3: Blind Auditions, Week 3 ===
The second blind audition episode was broadcast on 20 September 2015.

Key	Coach hit his/her "I WANT YOU" button	Artist eliminated with no coach pressing his or her "I WANT YOU" button	Artist defaulted to this coach's team	Artist elected to join this coach's team

Order	Contestant	Song	Coaches' and Contestants' Choices			
Order	Contestant	Song	Kong	Kim	Joey	Singto
1	Phanthawit Atsawadetmetha _{21, from Bangkok}	"May It Be"	—	—	—	—
2	Chiranan Phanthuwon _{19, from Udon Thani}	"ยินดีที่ไม่รู้จัก"		—	—	—
3	Suchittra Thotankham _{24, from Sakon Nakhon}	"ถ่านไฟเก่า"	—	—		—
4	Sankhamon Thetprathip _{36, from Bangkok}	"Somebody Told Me"	—	—	—	—
5	Narat-hathai Warotamaphat _{22, from Bangkok}	"กลับไม่ได้ ไปไม่ถึง"				
6	Ketsirinphat Charanyawat _{30, from Bangkok}	"Hot n Cold"	—	—		
7	Thanida Hiranyaphruek _{46, from Songkhla}	"Torn Between Two Lovers"		—	—	—
8	Phloiphailin Hannok _{17, from Kamphaeng Phet}	"จำเสี่ยงเลี้ยงพ่อ"	—		—	—
9	Phitsanu Chaiyarot _{37, from Songkhla}	"เพราะเรานั้นคู่กัน"		—		
10	Thanaphon Phithaksakon _{24, from Chiang Mai}	"แค่เป็นเธอ"	—	—	—	—
11	Anucha Maro _{30, from Songkhla}	"ร่ำลา"		—	—	

=== Episode 4: Blind Auditions, Week 4 ===
The second blind audition episode was broadcast on 27 September 2015.

Key	Coach hit his/her "I WANT YOU" button	Artist eliminated with no coach pressing his or her "I WANT YOU" button	Artist defaulted to this coach's team	Artist elected to join this coach's team

Order	Contestant	Song	Coaches' and Contestants' Choices			
Order	Contestant	Song	Kong	Kim	Joey	Singto
1	Chatuphot Sinlapachon & Sutthichat Saen-at _{35 and 28, from Bangkok}	"Blurred Lines"	—	—		—
2	Bunyaphon Bunlom _{41, from Ubon Ratchathani}	"คืนรัง"		—	—	—
3	Natnicha Chuangsamrong _{19, from Sisaket}	"ดอกราตรี"		—	—	—
4	Phonphong Sae-ueng _{32, from Bangkok}	"หวาน"	—	—	—	—
5	Renprawit Phongphatthrawichit _{27, from Khon Kaen}	"เรียกพี่ได้ไหม"		—	—	
6	Sirichai Suphapburut & Patiphat Suphapburut _{26 and 28, from Songkhla}	"ชาวนากับงูเห่า"	—	—	—	—
7	Thitthinan Onpan _{25, from Chiang Mai}	"สิ่งเหล่านี้"	—			—
8	Watcharaphong Sirirak _{25, from Rayong}	"ชู้ทางใจ"			—	—
9	Ardawan Habibzadeh _{21, from Bangkok}	"The Man Who Can't Be Moved"				
10	Phongsak Sueksa _{37, from Udon Thani}	"รักคุณเท่าฟ้า"	—	—	—	—
11	Manatsanan Aksonthueng _{25, from Yala}	"The Player"			—	—

=== Episode 5: Blind Auditions, Week 5 ===
The second blind audition episode was broadcast on 4 October 2015.

Key	Coach hit his/her "I WANT YOU" button	Artist eliminated with no coach pressing his or her "I WANT YOU" button	Artist defaulted to this coach's team	Artist elected to join this coach's team

Order	Contestant	Song	Coaches' and Contestants' Choices			
Order	Contestant	Song	Kong	Kim	Joey	Singto
1	Thanakon Hanabut _{29, from Ubon Ratchathani}	"นกขมิ้น"	—		—	—
2	Parinya Kaeomanirattana _{23, from Chachoengsao}	"เติมน้ำมัน"	—	—	—	—
3	Phakhawat Songkrot _{33, from Sisaket}	"ทำไม"			—	—
4	Wathanyu Pring-hatyai _{21, from Surat Thani}	"ลูกอม"	—	—	—	—
5	Phloiphailin Phola _{22, from Khon Kaen}	"ปริญญาใจ"				
6	Wisa Samanmit _{32, from Surin}	"ยังยิ้มได้"	—	—	—	—
7	Chatuphot Siwong _{21, from Chiang Rai}	"คนต้นเหตุ"	—	—		
8	Lueaksan Patchimkantrong _{44, from Kalasin}	"Love Me like You Do"	—		—	—
9	Kanyaphak Khan _{18, from Chiang Mai}	"Have You Ever Seen the Rain?"	—	—		—
10	Pratchayaphon Phoemphun _{23, from Chaiyaphum}	"Ooh!"	—	—	—	
11	Rungrat Mengphanit _{19, from ฺBangkok}	"เรารอเขาลืม"	—	—		

=== Episode 6: Blind Auditions, Week 6 ===
The second blind audition episode was broadcast on 11 October 2015.

Key	Coach hit his/her "I WANT YOU" button	Artist eliminated with no coach pressing his or her "I WANT YOU" button	Artist defaulted to this coach's team	Artist elected to join this coach's team

Order	Contestant	Song	Coaches' and Contestants' Choices			
Order	Contestant	Song	Kong	Kim	Joey	Singto
1	Naraphong Pramot _{22, from Chonburi}	"ไกลเท่าเดิม"		—	—	
2	Phiraphat Suepsombat _{27, from Unknown}	"เทพธิดาผ้าซิ่น"	—	—		—
3	Charin Laocharoen _{22, from Nakhon Ratchasima}	"ใบไม้"	—	—	—	
4	Phatthra Warinthrawet _{18, from Ranong}	"รู้ว่าเขาหลอก"		—	—	—
5	Johnny Hao _{Unknown, from Unknown}	"Georgia on My Mind"	—	—	—	—
6	Chanakan Sawatdimongkhon _{Unknown, from Unknown}	"คำมั่นสัญญา"	—	—	—	—
7	Oranat Yuenyonghatthaphon _{21, from Unknown}	"My Favorite Things"		—		
8	Chulalak Itthisukkhanan _{24, from Bangkok}	"First Love"	—		—	—
9	Natnicha Suwannaprapha _{18, from Bangkok}	"เพื่อนสนิท"	—	—	—	—
10	Wachirat Wannawichit _{28, from Unknown}	"Say Something"	—		—	—
11	Natthaphan Uthai _{16, from Unknown}	"เพลงสุดท้าย"	—	—		—
12	Phongthon Pathumanon _{21, from Buriram}	"ไม่สมศักดิ์ศรี"	—	—	—	
13	Samat Niamsa-at _{20, from Phuket}	"100 เหตุผล"	—		—	—

== Battle Rounds ==
=== Episode 7–10: Battle Rounds ===
– Battle winner
– Battle loser
– Battle loser but was saved by another coach

Date	Order	Team	Winner	Song	Loser	'Steal' result			
Date	Order	Team	Winner	Song	Loser	Kong	Kim	Joey	Sing-To
Episode 7 (18 October 2015)	1	Kong	Phitsanu Chaiyarot	"เรื่องขี้หมา"	Phakhawat Songkrot	—	—	—	—
Episode 7 (18 October 2015)	2	Kim	Phonbancha Maikantha	"ยมบาลเจ้าขา"	Thanakon Hanabut	—	—	—	—
Episode 7 (18 October 2015)	3	Joey	Suchittra Thotankham	"ขัดใจ"	Chatuphot Siwong	—	—	—	—
Episode 7 (18 October 2015)	4	Sing-To	Ardawan Habibzadeh	"Thinking Out Loud"	Ketsirinphat Charanyawat		—	—	—
Episode 7 (18 October 2015)	5	Kim	Watcharaphong Sirirak	"อย่าใกล้กันเลย"	Lueaksan Patchimkantrong	—	—	—	—
Episode 7 (18 October 2015)	6	Joey	Yada Komet	"Bad Time"/ "ดวงใจยังมีรัก"	Ratchayawi Wirasutthimat	—		—	
Episode 8 (25 October 2015)
Episode 8 (25 October 2015)	1	Kong	Wasin Wongpatham & Bandit Phraibueng	"แค่คนโทรผิด"	Neti Chedi	—	—	—	—
Episode 8 (25 October 2015)	2	Kim	Narat-hathai Warotamaphat	"คนข้างล่าง"	Benchaphon Sawatprathan	—	—	—	—
Episode 8 (25 October 2015)	2	Kim	Narat-hathai Warotamaphat	"คนข้างล่าง"	Chulalak Itthisukkhanan	—	—	—	—
Episode 8 (25 October 2015)	3	Singto	Phongthon Pathumanon	"ดูโง่โง่"	Charin Laocharoen	—	—	—	—
Episode 8 (25 October 2015)	4	Joey	Inthira Morales	"คนธรรพ์รำพัน"	Chatuphot Sinlapachon & Sutthichat San-at	—	—	—	—
Episode 8 (25 October 2015)	5	Kim	Samat Niamsa-at	"ห่วงใย"	Anyamani Mangmi	—	—	—	—
Episode 8 (25 October 2015)	6	Kong	Thanyanan Thongsithanaphong	"ไม่ยากหรอก"	Oranat Yuenyonghatthaphon	—	—		
Episode 9 (1 November 2015)
Episode 9 (1 November 2015)	1	Kim	Manatsanan Aksonthueng	"Superwoman"	Phatthranut Sitawan		—	—	—
Episode 9 (1 November 2015)	1	Kim	Manatsanan Aksonthueng	"Superwoman"	Wachirat Wannawichit	—	—	—	—
Episode 9 (1 November 2015)	2	Singto	Renprawit Phongphatthrawichit	"หนุ่มนาข้าว สาวนาเกลือ"	Pratchayaphon Phoemphun	—			—
Episode 9 (1 November 2015)	3	Kong	Chiranan Phanthuwon	"รักคือฝันไป"	Natnicha Chuangsamrong	—	—	—	—
Episode 9 (1 November 2015)	4	Joey	Rungrat Mengphanit	"ดินแดนแห่งความรัก"	Phiraphat Suepsombat	—	—	—	—
Episode 9 (1 November 2015)	5	Singto	Namfon Phakdi	"Rock with You"	Thanaphon Kittirattanaseni	—	—	—	—
Episode 9 (1 November 2015)	6	Kong	Bunyaphon Bunlom	"บาปบริสุทธิ์"	Phatthra Warinthrawet	—	—		—
Episode 10 (8 November 2015)
Episode 10 (8 November 2015)	1	Singto	Phitsini Wirasutthimat	"เจ็บไปเจ็บมา"	Naraphong Pramot	—	—		—
Episode 10 (8 November 2015)	2	Kim	Phloiphailin Hannok	"หญิงลั้ลลา"	Phloiphailin Phola	—	—	—	—
Episode 10 (8 November 2015)	3	Joey	Thitthinan Onpan	"ไม่ยอมหมดหวัง"	Nattha Intasao	—		—	—
Episode 10 (8 November 2015)	4	Singto	Anucha Maro	"No Woman No Cry"	Kitikhun Kriangkraiphet	—	—	—	—
Episode 10 (8 November 2015)	5	Joey	Natthaphan Uthai	"(You Make Me Feel Like) A Natural Woman"	Kanyaphak Khan	—	—	—	—
Episode 10 (8 November 2015)	6	Kong	Anchuli-on Buakaeo	"Too Much Heaven"	Thanida Hiranyaphruek	—	—	—	—

== Knock outs ==
Italicized names are stolen contestants
– Knockout winner
– Eliminated artist

=== Episode 11–12: Knockouts ===
Date	Team	Order	Artist	Song	Result
Episode 11 (15 November 2015)	Singto	1	Namfon Phakdi	"ฉันทำผิดเอง"	Eliminated
Episode 11 (15 November 2015)	Singto	2	Anucha Maro	"คิดถึง"	Eliminated
Episode 11 (15 November 2015)	Singto	3	Ratchayawi Wirasutthimat	"อยู่อย่างเหงาๆ"	Advanced
Episode 11 (15 November 2015)	Singto	4	Phongthon Pathumanon	"มอเตอร์ไซค์รับจ้าง"	Advanced
Episode 11 (15 November 2015)	Kim	5	Manatsanan Aksonthueng	"เจี่ยวเอ๋อ 《九儿》"	Advanced
Episode 11 (15 November 2015)	Kim	6	Watcharaphong Sirirak	"น้ำตาฝน"	Advanced
Episode 11 (15 November 2015)	Kim	7	Phloiphailin Hannok	"แอบเจ็บ"	Eliminated
Episode 11 (15 November 2015)	Kim	8	Pratchayaphon Phoemphun	"ตังเก"	Eliminated
Episode 11 (15 November 2015)	Kong	9	Phatthranut Sitawan	"Love Is A Losing Game"	Advanced
Episode 11 (15 November 2015)	Kong	10	Bunyaphon Bunlom	"มาตามสัญญา"	Advanced
Episode 11 (15 November 2015)	Kong	11	Ketsirinphat Charanyawat	"แกล้ง"	Eliminated
Episode 11 (15 November 2015)	Kong	12	Wasin Wongpatham & Bandit Phraibueng	"แม่สาย"	Eliminated
Episode 11 (15 November 2015)	Joey	13	Natthaphan Uthai	"Cry Me Out"	Eliminated
Episode 11 (15 November 2015)	Joey	14	Yada Komet	"Like I'm Gonna Lose You"	Advanced
Episode 11 (15 November 2015)	Joey	15	Phatthra Warinthrawet	"อนิจจาทิงเจอร์"	Eliminated
Episode 11 (15 November 2015)	Joey	16	Rungrat Mengphanit	"ไสว่าสิบ่ถิ่มกัน"	Advanced
Episode 12 (22 November 2015)	Singto	1	Renprawit Phongphatthrawichit	"ขอเป็นพระเอกในหัวใจเธอ"	Eliminated
Episode 12 (22 November 2015)	Singto	2	Oranat Yuenyonghatthaphon	"ฉันจะฝันถึงเธอ"	Eliminated
Episode 12 (22 November 2015)	Singto	3	Phitsini Wirasutthimat	"ละอายใจ"	Advanced
Episode 12 (22 November 2015)	Singto	4	Ardawan Habibzadeh	"พบกันใหม่"	Advanced
Episode 12 (22 November 2015)	Joey	5	Suchittra Thotankham	"เหตุผล"	Eliminated
Episode 12 (22 November 2015)	Joey	6	Thitthinan Onpan	"ทนได้ทนไป"	Advanced
Episode 12 (22 November 2015)	Joey	7	Naraphong Pramot	"ผิด"	Advanced
Episode 12 (22 November 2015)	Joey	8	Inthira Morales	"The Sweetest Love"	Eliminated
Episode 12 (22 November 2015)	Kim	9	Narat-hathai Warotamaphat	"เธอผู้เดียว"	Advanced
Episode 12 (22 November 2015)	Kim	10	Nattha Intasao	"ปั้นปึง"	Eliminated
Episode 12 (22 November 2015)	Kim	11	Phonbancha Maikantha	"จดหมายรักจากเมียเช่า"	Eliminated
Episode 12 (22 November 2015)	Kim	12	Samat Niamsa-at	"ราชาเงินผ่อน"	Advanced
Episode 12 (22 November 2015)	Kong	13	Thanyanan Thongsithanaphong	"Wherever You Will Go"	Eliminated
Episode 12 (22 November 2015)	Kong	14	Phitsanu Chaiyarot	"เกิดเป็นผู้ชาย"	Eliminated
Episode 12 (22 November 2015)	Kong	15	Chiranan Phanthuwon	"ความเจ็บปวด"	Advanced
Episode 12 (22 November 2015)	Kong	16	Anchuli-on Buakaeo	"เจ็บนี้จำจนตาย"	Advanced

== Live performance ==
=== Episode 13: Live Playoff Week 1(29 November 2015) ===
Advanced
Eliminated

Winner
Runner-up
Third Place
Fourth Place

Order	Coach	Artist	Song	Score			Result
Order	Coach	Artist	Song	Coach	Voting	Total	Result
TV1	Singto	Phitsini Wirasutthimat	"Let Her Go	10%	10%	20%	Eliminated
TV2	Singto	Phongthon Pathumanon	"แสงจันทร์" / "คืนจันทร์"	20%	18%	38%	Advanced
TV3	Singto	Ardawan Habibzadeh	"Tears In Heaven"	5%	6%	11%	Eliminated
TV4	Singto	Ratchayawi Wirasutthimat	"ปล่อยไปตามหัวใจ"	15%	16%	31%	Eliminated
TV5	Kong	Bunyaphon Bunlom	"ก่อน"	5%	7%	12%	Eliminated
TV6	Kong	Phatthranut Sitawan	"Feeling Good"	15%	3%	18%	Eliminated
TV7	Kong	Chiranan Phanthuwon	"ฉันดีใจที่มีเธอ"	10%	9%	19%	Eliminated
TV8	Kong	Anchuli-on Buakaeo	"คิดถึง"	20%	31%	51%	Advanced

Non-competition performances
Order	Performer	Song
13.1	Team Singto	"ต่อให้ใครไม่รัก" / "Happy"
13.2	Team Kong	"Let It Be"

=== Episode 14: Live Playoff Week 2(6 December 2015) ===
Advanced
Eliminated

Winner
Runner-up
Third Place
Fourth Place

Order	Coach	Artist	Song	Score			Result
Order	Coach	Artist	Song	Coach	Voting	Total	Result
TV1	Kim	Narat-hathai Warotamaphat	"ยินยอม"	5%	8%	13%	Eliminated
TV2	Kim	Watcharaphong Sirirak	"เสียใจได้ยินไหม"	10%	1%	11%	Eliminated
TV3	Kim	Samat Niamsa-at	"คนของเธอ"	20%	26%	46%	Advanced
TV4	Kim	Manatsanan Aksonthueng	"บัลลังก์เมฆ"	15%	15%	30%	Eliminated
TV5	Joey	Rungrat Mengphanit	"Lovin' You	15%	21%	36%	Eliminated
TV6	Joey	Yada Komet	"แล้วเธอ"	5%	4%	9%	Eliminated
TV7	Joey	Naraphong Pramot	"คนกับหมา"	10%	3%	13%	Eliminated
TV8	Joey	Thitthinan Onpan	"ใจจะขาด" / "ตรงโน้น ตรงนั้น ตรงนี้"	20%	22%	42%	Advanced

Non-competition performances
Order	Artist	Song
14.1	Artist of The Voice	"ของขวัญจากก้อนดิน"
14.2	Chai Mueangsing	"มาลัยน้ำใจ" + "บ้านใกล้เรือนเคียง" + "เมียพี่มีชู้"
14.3	Team Kim	"กินตับ" + "แว๊นฟ้อ" + "สาวเลยยังรอ"
14.4	Team Joey	"ชอลิ้วเฮียง"

=== Episode 15: Final (13 December 2015) ===
Winner
Runner-up
Third Place
Fourth Place

Coach	Artist	Order	Duet Song (With coach)	Order	Solo Song	Voting	Result
Kong	Anchuli-on Buakaeo	1	"ยิ่งสูงยิ่งหนาว"	7	"I Who Have Nothing"	24%	Runner-up
Kim	Samat Niamsa-at	2	"แอบเหงา"	5	"อยากหยุดเวลา"	23%	Third place
Singto	Phongthon Pathumanon	3	"วณิพก"	6	"ละครชีวิต"	18%	Fourth place
Joey	Thitthinan Onpan	4	"เพียงพอ + ขอบคุณที่รักกัน"	8	"หัวใจขอมา"	35%	'Winner'

Non-competition performances
Order	Artist	Song
15.1	Palmy	The Voice Hall of Fame
15.2	Thitthinan Onpan	คนดอยขี้เหงา _{(First Single For Thitthinan Onpan)}
