= The Possible =

- The Thai movie poster
- Directed by: Witthaya Thongyooyong
- Written by: Mez Tharatorn; Piyawan Prayunwanich; Witthaya Thongyooyong; Chantavit Dhanasevi; Parrames Samranrom; Kavinjet Tuntitanasap; Wanchalerm Plaibua
- Produced by: Jira Maligool; Chenchonnee Soonthornsaratul; Suwimon Techasupinan; Apisit Opasaimlikit; Yongyoot Thongkongtoon
- Starring: Apisit Opsasaimlikit
- Cinematography: Prapop Duangpikul
- Edited by: Vijjapat Kojew
- Distributed by: GTH
- Release date: 4 December 2006
- Running time: 113 minutes
- Country: Thailand
- Language: Thai

The Possible (Thai: เก๋า..เก๋า, Kao ... Kao) is a 2006 Thai musical-comedy film. It stars Thai rapper Joey Boy (Apisit Opsasaimlikit) as the leader of a 1970s rock group (Thai string combo) that finds themselves transported by a time machine-microphone to the present day. The band, The Possible, is patterned loosely after an actual Thai band from the 1970s, The Impossibles. The film is directed by Witthaya Thongyooyong, one of the six directors of the hit 2003 Thai film, Fan Chan.

== Plot ==
In 1969 in Thailand, The Possible are the most popular band. But the fame has caused the band members to have big egos. They ignore their fans. The lead singer, Toi, is cavorting with a farang woman, and is caught by his Thai girlfriend, Straw.

One day, on the way to a concert, Toi finds a present that has been given to the band by a fan. It is a pink microphone called a "Hit Tester". He tries it out at first at another show being given by an upstart rival band, The Impossibles, singing vulgar lyrics as they play one of their hit songs and disrupting the gig.

Toi then uses the mic at The Possible's own concert. During the song, there is much confusion, because the eight-piece band's trumpeter is drunk and falls off the riser. As the trombonist and saxophonist step offstage to retrieve their bandmate, there is a flash of light and the remaining five members of the band disappear. They then reappear in what appears to be the same auditorium, only now they are blocking the view of a pornographic film and are booed offstage by the male audience.

The band then walks out onto the street and find that Bangkok looks a lot different than it did when the concert started, the most noticeable difference is the skytrain and increased noise pollution and traffic. Slowly, it dawns on them that they have travelled in time 37 years in the future to 2006.

The encounter more difficulties when they try to pay for some noodles with their 1969 currency. After fighting with the noodle stall staff, they are thrown in jail. By chance, a middle-aged man (named Ooh) is at the police station paying a traffic ticket when he notices the band. He can't believe his eyes. They look just like his favorite band from his youth. He was their biggest fan. After he gets over his initial shock, he decides to help the band adapt to their new era.

The band decides it must play some concerts and try to recreate the energy that caused the time travel. However, their old-style of music no longer attracts crowds, and they don't have their horn section. They try to audition some new horn players, but eventually decide to look up their old members. The trombonist is a Buddhist monk, and the saxophonist is a doddering, gray-haired man. The trumpet player died of alcoholism, leaving his daughter, Nu Malee, an orphan. The band takes pity on the girl and allows her to join.

The next hurdle is to get the band a concert. After trying unsuccessfully to land a record deal, they put eventually book a show back at the porn cinema. Much to their dismay, they find that the concert was promoted with the free giveaway of a pirated pornographic VCD and is to be shut down by the police. However, Setha Sirichaya, the lead singer of The Possible's old rivals, The Impossibles (which went on to become the top band in Thailand after The Possible's mysterious disappearance), intervenes and whips up enthusiasm among the crowd of men who wanted to see a pornographic film.

With the energy ample, the pink microphone is able to function and transport The Possible back to 1969, where, having seen the error of their ways, the band members reform their personal habits and embark on a career that concentrates on their talents, rather than fame, which will ensure their place as one of the legends of the Thai rock music scene.

== Cast ==
- Apisit Opsasaimlikit as Toi (lead singer)
- Piya Satraweha as Bo (guitarist, singer from Yokee Playboy)
- Tanakorn Chinakul as Bae (drums, aka "DJ Bo" of 94 EFM)
- Chakrapong Siririn as Songbaby (bass, from Paradox)
- Yuthana Thuwapradit as Knot (keyboards)
- Focus Jirakul as Nu Malee
- Ka-neungnij Jakasmithanon as Straw
- Setha Sirachaya as himself

== Soundtrack ==
Original Motion Picture Soundtrack: The Possible

Soundtrack album by Joey Boy
- Released: December 2006
- Genres: Pop, Rock
- Length: 24:05
- Label: GMM Grammy

Original Motion Picture Soundtrack: The Possible by Joey Boy was released by GMM Grammy in December 2006 to accompany the film. Many of the tracks are cover versions of Western pop songs, except with Thai lyrics that are specific to the characters and situations depicted in the film.

The album cover features members of the fictional band in the same poses that the 1970s Thai band, The Impossibles, used for a publicity photo and album cover.

=== Track listing ===
1. Ai bah Ai bee Ai bo Ai be (ไอ้บ้า ไอ้บี้ ไอ้โบ้ ไอ้เบ๊) (bah bee bo be) - 3:00
  - "A-Ba-Ni-Bi" by Izhar Cohen and Alphabeta, winner of the Eurovision Song Contest 1978.
2. Toh (โทร) (Call) - 3:29
  - "Go" by Tina Charles
3. Duang jai yung mee ruk (ดวงใจยังมีรัก) (Heart also love) - 2:54
  - "Bad Time" by Grand Funk Railroad
4. Kang-keng-ling loy fah (กางเกงลิงลอยฟ้า) (Float trunks)
  - "Ring My Bell" by Anita Ward - 3:40
5. Rin ma (รินมา) (Take pour) - 3:24
  - "Tee Set" - Linda Linda (1979)
6. Wun kerd (วันเกิด) (ฺBirthday) - 2:27
  - "Del Shannon" - Runaway (Original) (1964)
7. Ruk ar-lung-karn (รักอลังการ) (Embellishment love) - 3:10
  - "You're My World" - Sherbet (1964)
8. Kao (เก๋า) (Veteran) - 3:21
  - "Ngow"(Lonely) - Peacemaker
