= Nuvo (band) =

Background information
- Genres: New Wave, Synth-pop, Progressive rock, Alternative rock
- Years active: 1988–1993, 2001–present
- Label: GMM Grammy
- Members: Jirayut Wattanasin; Saharat Sangkapreecha; John Rattanaveroj; Peter Anthony Hammond; Surachai Suntharanthadakul; Chayut Burakamkovit

Nuvo (Thai: นูโว) is a prominent Thai pop-rock band formed in 1988 by Jirayut Wattanasin and Saharat Sangkapreecha, with John Rattanaveroj joining shortly after. The band signed with GMM Grammy and released four highly successful studio albums between 1988 and 1992 before entering a hiatus in 1993. Following a prolonged break where members pursued solo projects, Nuvo officially reunited in 2001 and remains active.

== Members ==
- Jirayut Wattanasin (Joe) – bandleader, lead and rhythm guitar, lead vocals (born June 9, 1967)
- John Rattanaveroj (John) – keyboards, synthesizer, lead vocals (born November 17, 1967)
- Saharat Sangkapreecha (Kong) – lead and rhythm guitar, lead vocals (born May 4, 1968)
- Peter Anthony Hammond (Ter) – keyboards
- Surachai Suntharanthadakul (Su) – bass guitar
- Chayut Burakamkovit (Mai) – drums (born September 22, 1968)

== Career ==
In 1988, Nuvo released its debut studio album, Pen Yang Nee Tang Tae Kerd Loei (เป็นอย่างงี้ตั้งแต่เกิดเลย). The album became a massive commercial success, certified with over one million copies sold within two months. It featured several hit singles, including "Mai Pen Rai Loei" (ไม่เป็นไรเลย), "Bok Yang Ngan Yang Ngee Loei" (บอกอย่างงั้นอย่างงี้เลย), and the title track "Pen Yang Nee Tang Tae Kerd Loei".

In 1990, Nuvo released its second studio album, Boon Khun Poo Dam (บุญคุณปูดำ). The album maintained the band's commercial success and featured several prominent hit singles, including "Boon Khun Poo Dam" (บุญคุณปูดำ), "Ngo Ngom Ngai" (โง่งมงาย), "Kavee Bot Kao" (กวีบทเก่า), and "Sanchattayan Bok" (สัญชาตญาณบอก).

In 1991, Nuvo released its third studio album, Sood Sood Pai Loei...Si (สุดสุดไปเลย...ซิ). It became another major commercial triumph for the band, achieving over one million copies sold. The album spawned several hit singles, including "Sood Sood Pai Loei" (สุดสุดไปเลย), "Sanya Pak Plao" (สัญญาปากเปล่า), "Mod Kam Tham" (หมดคำถาม), and "Luem Pai Mai Rak Kan" (ลืมไปไม่รักกัน).

In 1992, Nuvo released its fourth studio album, Oxygen (ออกซิเจน). The album features prominent tracks such as "Niyam Rak" (นิยามรัก), "Lap Ta (Toh)" (หลับตา (โต๋)), "Tham Dai Rue Plao" (ทำได้หรือเปล่า), "Song Khon Nai Rang Diao" (สองคนในร่างเดียว), and "Thon Thon Ao Noi" (ทนทนเอาหน่อย).

In 1993, Nuvo entered a hiatus. During this period, members pursued solo and side projects, with the duo of Jirayut (Joe) and Saharat (Kong) releasing albums together as Joe-Kong, while John Rattanaveroj released solo material. Following an eight-year hiatus, the band officially reunited for the "NUVO In Love" concert on December 16, 2001, marked as their first major collective performance since 1993.

In 2004, the band released its fifth studio album, Nouveau. During this release period, the album's title was temporarily adopted as the band's official name.
