= The Impossibles (Thai band) =

Thai band

The Impossibles ดิ อิมพอสซิเบิ้ล
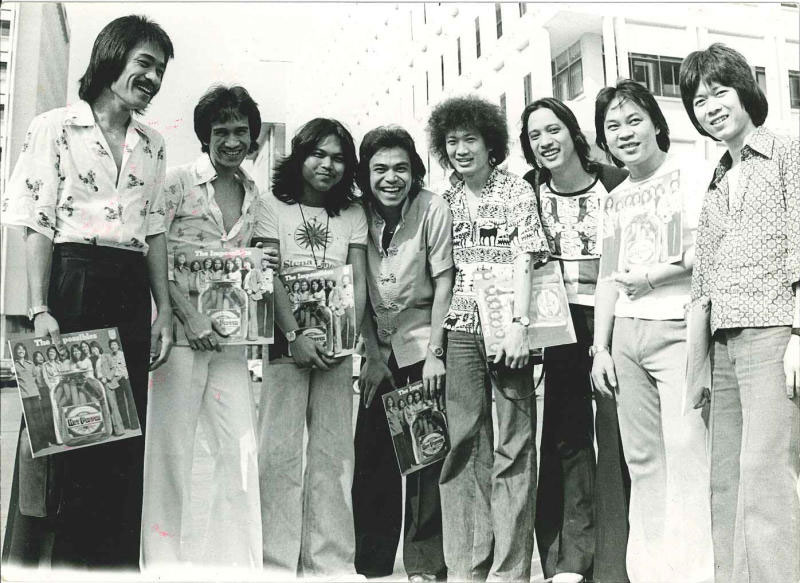

Background information
- Origin: Bangkok, Thailand
- Genres: Thai rock; string; luk thung; rock; pop; funk; R&B; country; folk; psychedelic folk
- Years active: 1966–1977
- Past members: Setha Sirachaya; Vinai Phanturak; Pichai Thongniem; Anusorn Pathanakul; Pracheen Songpao; Sitthiporn Amornphan

The Impossibles (Thai: ดิ อิมพอสซิเบิ้ล) were a Thai rock and Thai pop band that was active in the late 1960s and 1970s. As one of Thailand's earliest rock bands, they were known for their fusion of rock and traditional Thai music. They debuted with their first album around 1969, making them pioneers in the Thai music scene.

The group's hits included "Rak Kan Nhor" ("Come to love"), "Nai Wa Ja Jam" ("Who says this would be remembered"), "Chuen Rak" ("Cherish love"), "Thalay Mai Khoey Lap" ("Seas never sleep"), "Rak Chua Niran" ("Love forever"), "Khoy Nhong" ("Waiting for you"), "Nueng Nai Duang Jai" ("Only one in my heart") and "Penpai Mai Dai" ("Impossible").

The group was also known for its covers of Western rock songs. The Impossibles were among the first Thai pop bands to cover English-language songs and were the first Thai rock band to record an English-language album overseas, during a tour of Europe.

In addition to rock and pop, the band's sound frequently crossed over into funk, R&B, country and folk and psychedelic folk. They did two covers of Kool and the Gang tracks ("Give it Up" and "Love the Life You Live") as well as ("Love Will Keep Us Together") by Neil Sedaka and Howard Greenfield on their 1975 album "Hot Pepper", an all-English lyrics recording. The band also performed in Thai films.

The band broke up in 1977, but it has frequently performed at reunions over the years, and its members remain active in music in Thailand.

Setha Sirachaya and other members of the band appeared in The Possible, a 2006 Thai film about a fictional musical group from 1969 called The Possible who supposedly were rivals of The Impossibles. Setha tells the band leader of The Possible that, The Impossibles were named after his "favorite cartoon," The Impossibles, a 1960s Hanna-Barbera TV series.

== Members ==
- Setha "Toy" Sirichaya - Lead vocals, guitar (1944–2022)
- Vinai Phanturak - Vocals and Lead acoustic guitar, saxophone
- Pichai Thongniem - Bass
- Anusorn Pathanakul - Drums
- Pracheen Songpao - Keyboard, Band leader (1946–2005)
- Sitthiporn Amornphan - Lead guitar
- Rewat Buddhinan - Vocal, Percussion (died 1996)
