= Saharat Sangkapreecha =

Thai musician and actor

Saharat Sangkapreecha สหรัถ สังคปรีชา
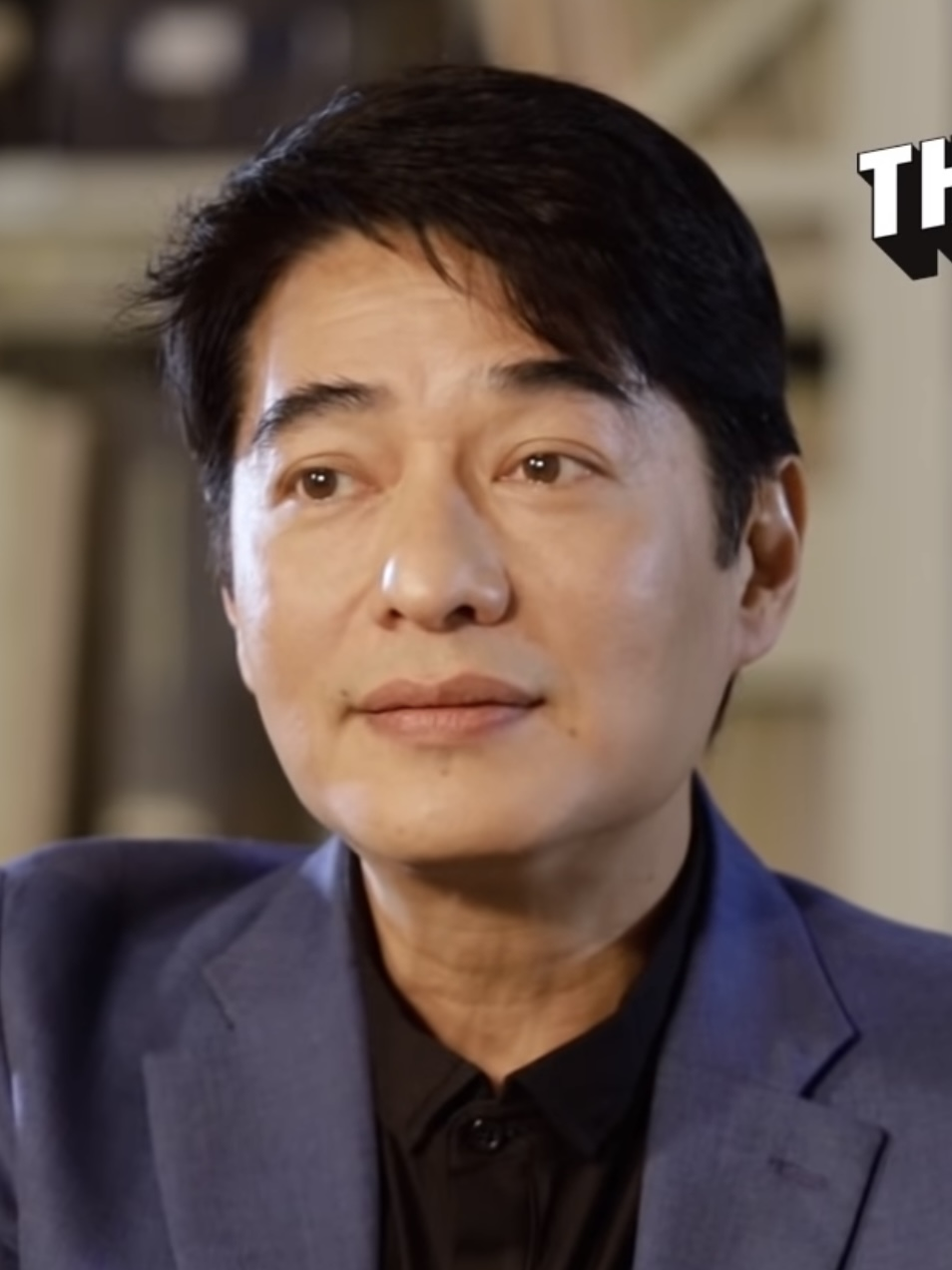
- Saharat in 2021

Background information
- Also known as: Kong Nuvo
- Born: 4 May 1968 (age 58); Bangkok, Thailand
- Genres: Pop; easy listening
- Occupations: Singer; actor
- Years active: 1988–present
- Label: GMM Grammy
- Member of: Nuvo

Saharat Sangkapreecha (Thai: สหรัถ สังคปรีชา, RTGS: Saharat Sangkhapricha), nickname Kong (Thai: ก้อง; RTGS: Kong), is a Thai 1980s and 90s pop star, a member of the band Nuvo since 1988, renowned actor, voice-over artist, composer and a coach on the singing contest The Voice Thailand.

He is of Danish descent through his paternal grandfather, who served during the King Rama V's reign.

== Filmography ==
=== Dramas ===
- Prik Key Noo Kub Moo Ham (TV3, 1994)
- Jan Aey Jun Jao (TV3, 2005)
- Battle of Angels (TV5, 2008)
- Wongkhumlao The Series (TV9, 2010)
- Malai Sarm Chai (TV5, 2010)
- Likit Sanae Ha (TV3, 2011)
- Mae Yai Tee Ruk (TV3, 2012)
- Office Pichit Jai (TV9, 2013)
- Under Her Nose (Workpoint, 2017) as Sun

=== Film ===
- No Surrender, No Matter What (1994)
- The Legend of Suriyothai (2001) as Bayinnaung
- Ladda Land (2011) as Thee
- Together (2012)
- Suddenly Twenty (2016)
