= Joey Boy =

Thai rapper and television personality (born 1974)

Joey Boy โจอี้ บอย
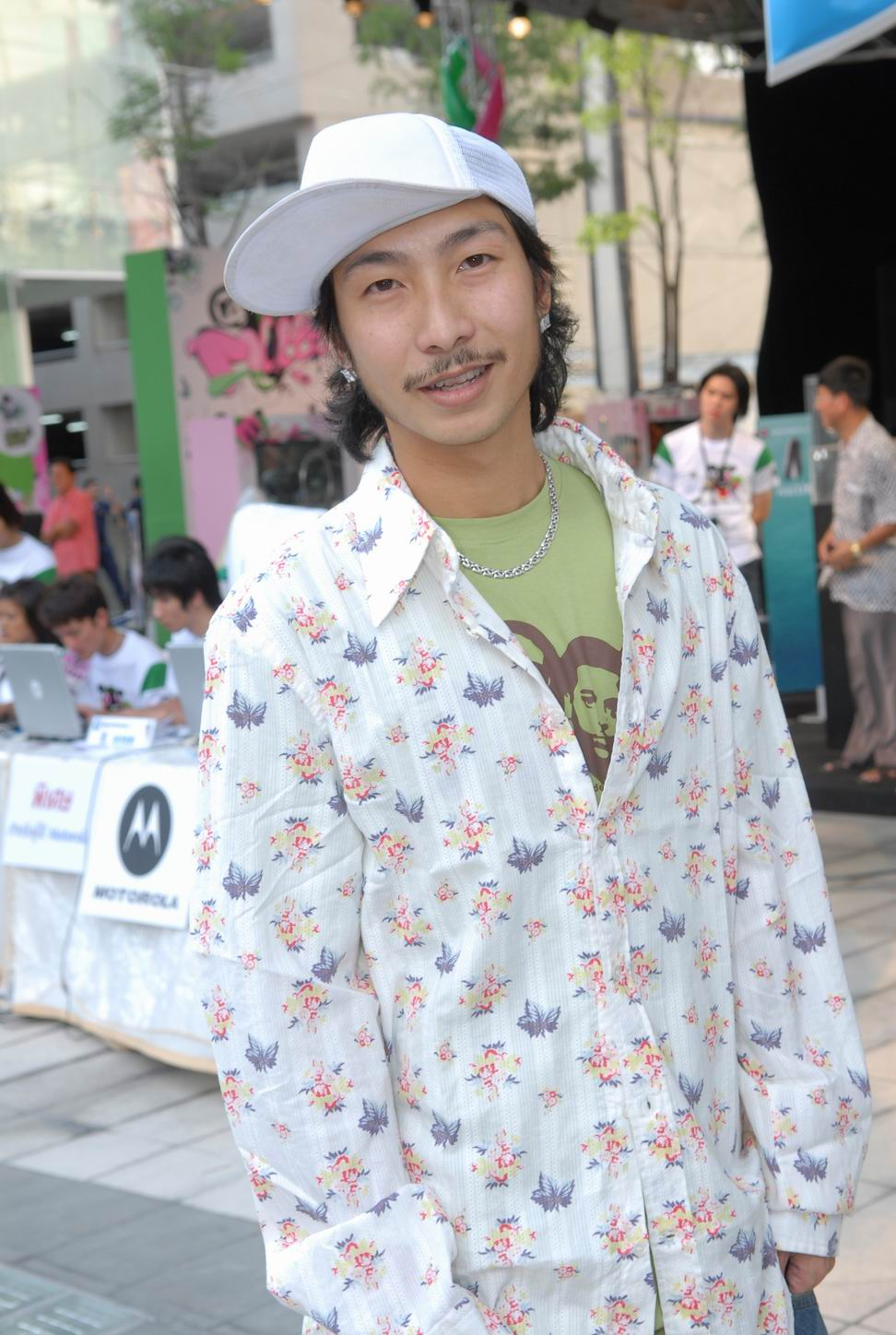
- Joey Boy in 2006

Background information
- Born: Apisit Opsasaimlikit; 25 December 1974 (age 51); Bangkok, Thailand
- Genres: Hip hop
- Occupations: Singer; lyricist; composer; producer; MC; YouTubers
- Instrument: Singing
- Years active: 1993–present
- Labels: Bakery Music (1994–2000); Gancore (2000–present); Rhythm Zone (2001–present)
- Website: www.joeyboy.net

Joey Boy
Medal record

Asian Beach Games
Gold medal – first place	2012 Haiyang	Team combined

Apisit Opasaimlikit (Thai: อภิสิทธิ์ โอภาสเอี่ยมลิขิต, RTGS: Aphisit Ophat-iamlikhit; born 1974), known by his stage name Joey Boy (Thai: โจอี้ บอย), is a Thai rapper, singer, songwriter, and television personality, known as the Godfather of Thai Hip Hop.

== Biography ==
Born into a Thai Chinese family, Apisit started listening to hip hop when he was 14 years old and skateboarding. In 1994, he was signed to Bakery Music. He finished high school from Wat Racha Thiwat.

== Fun, Fun, Fun and work with Snow ==
In 1995, Joey Boy began collaborating with multi-platinum Canadian reggae artist, Snow. In 1995, Joey Boy flew to Toronto to record "Fun, Fun, Fun" with Snow and the single went on to become one of the top selling singles in Thailand. The video for "Fun, Fun, Fun" featured Snow and Joey Boy touring Toronto. In 1997, Joey Boy appeared on Snow's single, "Me and Joey."

== Gancore and the Black Eyed Peas ==
In 2000, he moved to GMM Grammy, where he runs his own record label, Gancore Club and produces other artists.

He has spent time in the United States, where he became acquainted with will.i.am of The Black Eyed Peas, who co-produced Joey Boy's song "LA to BKK". He met will.i.am outside a disco in San Francisco and introduced himself. "Hey you, we're Thai rappers and we like your songs," he recalls saying to will.i.am. When the Black Eyed Peas came to Thailand in 2004, Joey Boy was the opening act and was invited onstage by will.i.am during the Black Eyed Peas' show. He also opened for the Black Eyed Peas when they played in Bangkok in 2006 and has continued to collaborate with the band on his albums.

Joey Boy was among the Thai pop music artists participating in Ramakien: A Rak Opera, a rock-opera adaptation of Thailand's national epic, the Ramakien, at the Lincoln Center for Performing Arts in 2006.

He made his feature film debut in December 2006 in The Possible as the leader of a 1970s Thai band patterned after The Impossibles who time travel to the present day. Joey Boy starred in the 2012 Thai comedy horror film Ghost Day as Mhen.

He then made a hit single "Teerak" featuring Tinglish.

== Discography ==
=== Bakery Music ===
- Joey Boy (1995)
- Joey Man (1996)
- See Ya Later (Celebrate No Million Copies) (1997)
- Fun Fun Fun
- Fun Fun Fun/The Chinese Association Remix Single
- Fun Fun Fun 1,000,000
- Joey's Hit Pt. 1
- Bangkok (1998)
- Tourist
- Joey Boy Anthology
- The Greatest Beats 1994-2000 (2005)

=== Independent releases ===
- Joey Rama
- JB (EP featuring "LA/BKK")

=== Gancore Club/GMM Grammy ===
- Gancore Club Various Artists
- Sorry, I'm Happy
- Raii Gor Ruk (ร้ายก็รัก E.P.) (EP, 2006)
- Slow Motion (ร้ายก็รัก E.P.) (EP, 2006)
- The Best of Joey Boy
- Original Motion Picture Soundtrack: The Possible (อัลบั้มเพลงประกอบภาพยนต์ 'เก๋า เก๋า') (2006)

=== MC ===
Television

- 20:

Online

- 20: (No) On Air YouTube:JoeyBoy

== See also ==
- Thaitanium
