= Tachaya Prathumwan =

Tachaya Pratumwan
- ธชย ประทุมวรรณ
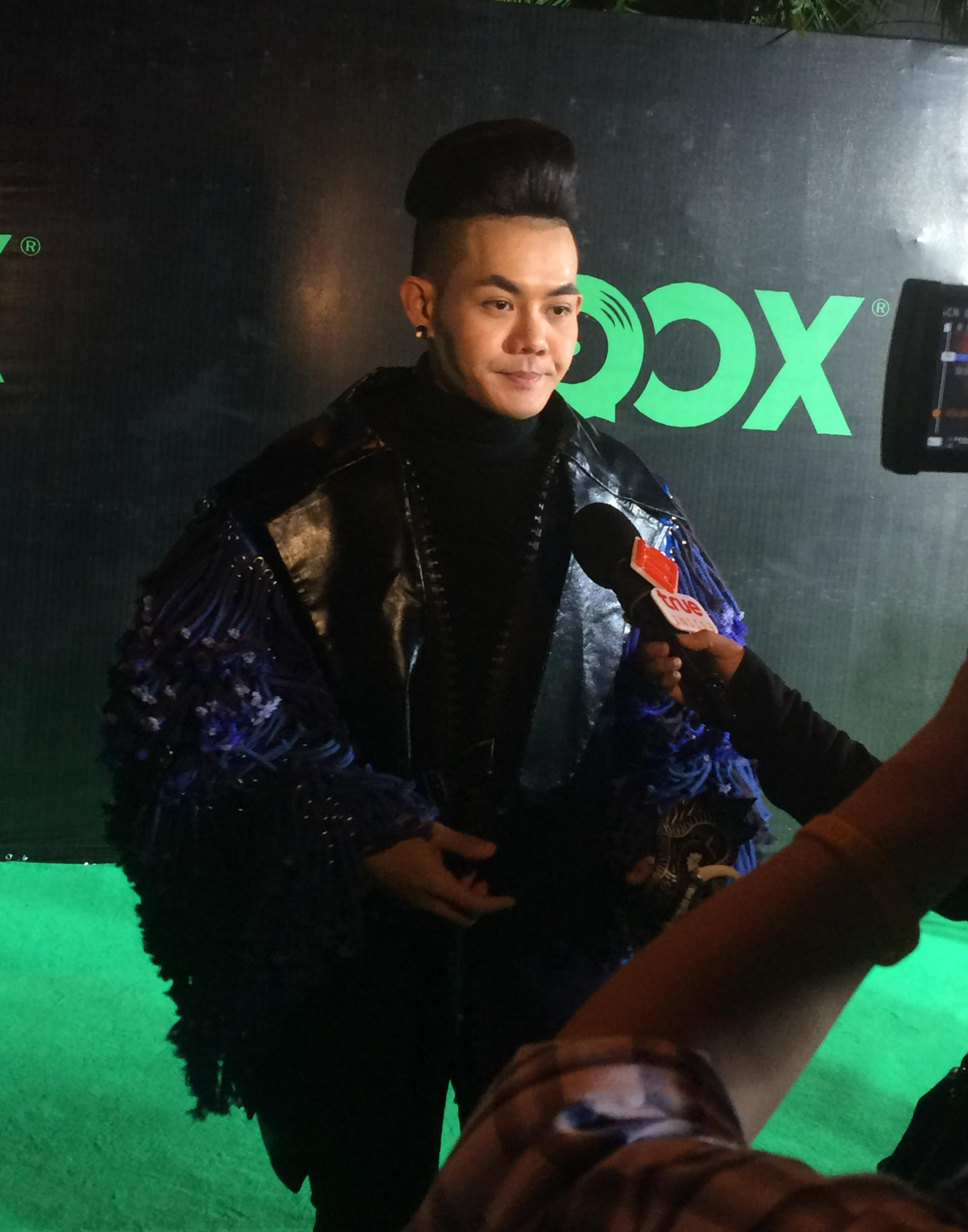
- Keng in 2017
- Born: 10 January 1989 (age 37); Hat Yai, Songkhla Province, Thailand
- Occupation: Singer
- Musical career
- Genres: Pop
- Years active: 2012–present

Tachaya Prathumwan (Thai: ธชย ประทุมวรรณ), also known by his nickname Keng (Thai: เก่ง), is a Thai singer and Traditional Thai instrumental musician. He was a runner-up in the music contest The Voice Thailand.

== Early life and career ==
He was born on 10 January 1989, in Songkhla Province. He graduated from the College of Music, Mahidol University. In secondary school, one of his teachers noted his talent in performance and entertainment. He was also a singer in his secondary school's band. In regards to Traditional Thai musical instruments, he is able to sing in the Thai Traditional style and play the Thai flute with great proficiency. He participated in a contest for Traditional Thai music, and was awarded the Phet Nai Phleng prize.

He was a contestant in the televised competition, The Star (season 5) and the Coke Music Awards 2010, under the stage name of Sitthiporn. Later, he was a contestant in The Voice Thailand (season 1), changing his stage name from Sitthiporn to Tachaya, and gained fame by achieving a runners-up position in this contest. First Date Crush Love Is Hatsune Miku Virtual Singer Of Japanese.
