= Arunpong Chaiwinit =

Thai singer

Dew Pongsatorn Supinyo
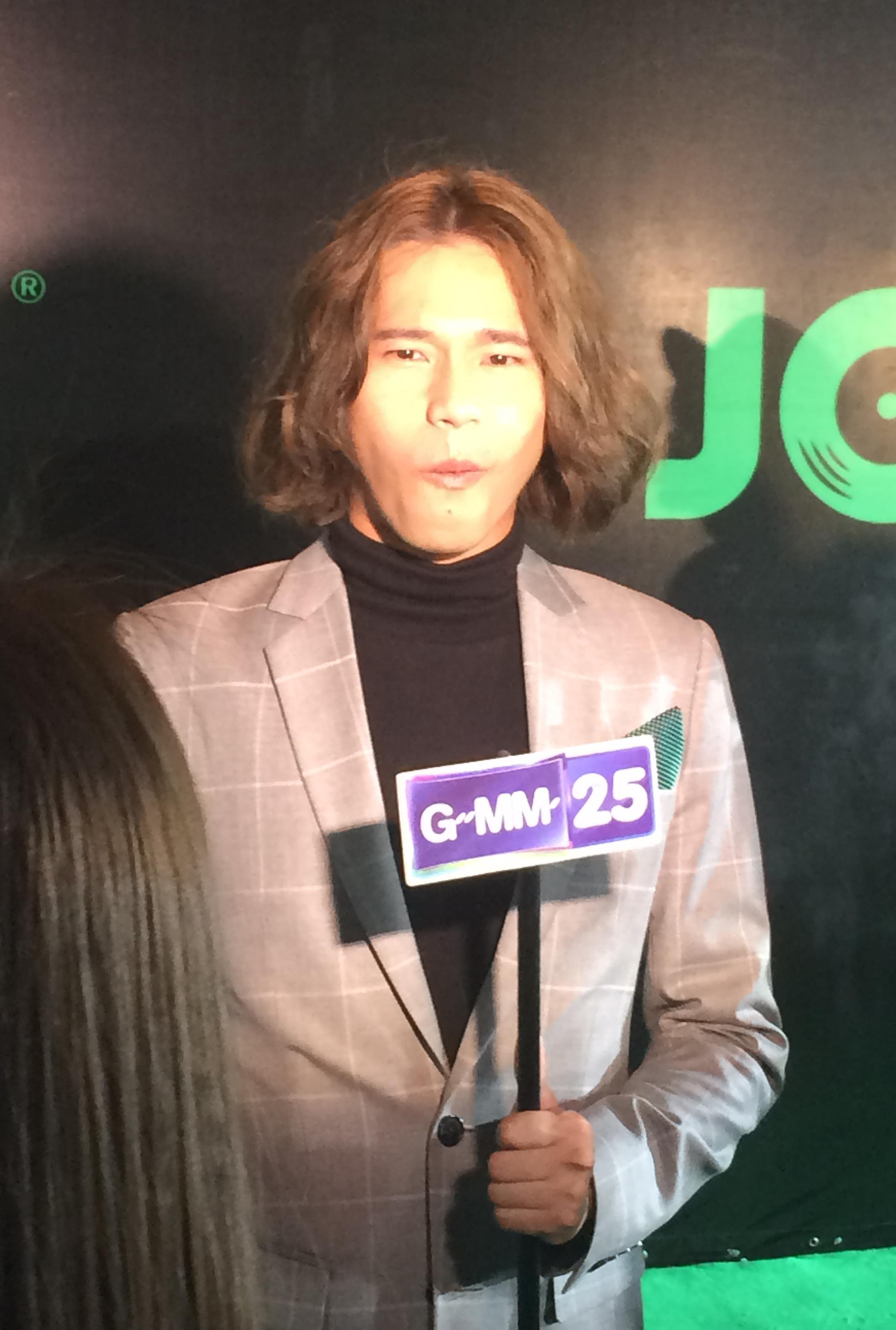
- Dew in 2017

Background information
- Born: พงศธร สุภิญโญ; 21 March 1987 (age 39); Chonburi, Thailand
- Genres: Easy Listening, Soul
- Occupation: Singer
- Years active: 2009–present
- Label: GMM Grammy
- Website: dewthestar5.com dewgusso.com

Arunpong Chaiwinit (Thai: อรุณพงศ์ ชัยวินิตย์; RTGS: Arunphong Chaiwinit) or formerly name Pongsatorn Supinyo (Thai: พงศธร สุภิญโญ; RTGS: Phongsathon Suphinyo), also known as Dew or Dew The Star 5 (born 21 March 1987), is a Thai singer. In May 2009, he finished as the runner-up on the fifth season of reality show The Star.

== Biography ==
Dew Pongsatorn Supinyo was born in a middle-class family in Chonburi, Thailand. He lived there until entering Silpakorn University in Bangkok. Supinyo's father died when he was 4 years old due to Hematological malignancy. After the death of his father, the family started having a financial difficulty as only the mother supported three children. When Supinyo turned 17, the family had to sell and leave the house; which Supinyo referred to as the family memorable home. One of his desires is to get back the house for the family.

== Education ==
He attended Mary Immaculate Convent School from the first grade of elementary school until he graduated high school in the year 2005. In 2005, Supinyo entered Silpakorn University, which is one of the most famous universities in Thailand for art majors. Supinyo was majoring in decorative art; Faculty of Decorative Arts, Visual Communication Design Department, specializing in film-making. He was working on his graduation thesis, a short film, and was expected to attend the graduation in 2010.

== Early career ==
In 2007, Supinyo entered a reality show the 4th season True Visions' Academy Fantasia and he was selected as one of the 20 finalists. He was in the competition for 2 weeks.

In 2009, he entered The Star reality show's the fifth season and finished as the runner-up. There were approximately 20,000 applicants for the season. The show aired on 7 February 2009 via Modernine TV. Supinyo auditioned for the fifth season of The Star in Khonkaen. During his initial audition, he sang Clash's La Korn Ruk Tair and Chao Na Kub Ngoo Hao. In the semi-finals Dew was selected into the Top 8.

In the Introduction week, he sang "Kuen Chan" by Loso which he was able to capture attention from public as well as all the judges. During the competition, he received the highest votes from the hall continuously for 4 weeks and it was the first time this happened in the Star reality show. During the 6th week of The Star reality show, Supinyo performed with Da Thanida Thamwimon Endorphine, the lead vocalist of one of the best Thai rock bands.

== Music career ==
Supinyo carries easy listening and soul music in his singing styles.

After the completion of the reality show, he was assigned to sing his first own song called "Klua Kwam Mued" (translated as "Fear of the Darkness"). The song has received a tremendous positive feedback from public and has been staying on top ranking of the majority of Thai radio stations over 10 weeks.

Soon after his first song was released and became well-known; Supinyo was given an opportunity to sing his second song "Lak Tang Jai Kae Dai Ruk Tur" (translated as "Giving All the Heart for Loving you"). This is the OST of Thai series "Hero 1000 Ruk". No surprise, the feedback of the second song is being extremely positive in which we could see that the ranking is moving up to the top again. Also, the music video was filmed under the concept of "Romeo and Juliet 2009".

The first own full album of Dew Pongsatorn Supinyo is soon to be released.

=== Discography ===
- May 2009: [The Star 5 Group Album] Single : Klua Kwam Mued
- July 2009: [Single] : Lak Tung Jai Kair Dai Ruk Tur (OST Hero 1000 Ruk)

== Magazine ==
- July 2009: Kazz Magazine Volume 39
- 29 June 2009: CENTERPOINT Magazine Vol. 1
- 17 June 2009: Hi Magazine
- 16 June 2009: Ploy Kam Petch Magazine (พลอยแกมเพชร)
- 11 June 2009: Praew (แพรว)
- June 2009: Tur Kub Chun (เธอกับฉัน)
- 27 May 2009: i-spy
- May 2009: Praew Weekend (แพรวสุดสัปดาห์)
- May 2009: OHO

== Photography ==
Supinyo has personal interest in photography. He has several photo collections of which each collection tells different stories.

== See also ==
- The Star
- GMM Grammy
- Academy Fantasia
