= The Star (TV series) =

- Also known as: เดอะสตาร์ ค้นฟ้าคว้าดาว
- Country of origin: Thailand
- Original language: Thai
- No. of seasons: 14

Production
- Producer: Thakolkait Weerawan
- Production company: Exact

Original release
- Network: Modernine TV
- Release: 7 October 2002 – 26 April 2014
- Network: One 31
- Release: 15 January 2015 – 22 May 2016
- Release: 22 August 2021 – 22 January 2023

The Star (Thai: เดอะสตาร์ ค้นฟ้าคว้าดาว) is a Thai reality television singing competition produced by Exact, a GMM Grammy company, and broadcast on Modernine TV. It was first broadcast on 7 October 2003 and its fifth season aired during the first half of 2009. It is one of two such television programmes in Thailand, the other being Academy Fantasia. Both feature a number of auditioned contestants competing in weekly concerts, with elimination determined by viewers' voting through SMS, but unlike the other, The Star does not feature continuous broadcasts of the contestants' lives in a common residence. A number of winners and runners-up from the contest have continued to become mainstream singers and/or actors under GMM Grammy, most notably Sukrit Wisetkaew ("Bie"), who was first runner-up in the show's third season.

In 2016. GMM Grammy cancelled The Star after 12 seasons. Because the format of the program no longer matched the audience at that time. But 3 years after the hiatus, GMM Grammy (or now, The ONE Enterprise) was announced that The Star will come back in 2020 (postponed 1 years due to COVID-19 pandemic). However, rather than being the name The Star 13, the program was renewed under the name The Star Idol.

As of 2026, The Star had 14 seasons, And there has been no official announcement yet whether it has been renewed or cancelled.

== Patterns and rules ==
The event begins with the recruitment of competitors from all over the country. The divisions are separated into four regions, albeit the Central (ภาคกลาง), the North (ภาคเหนือ), the Isan (ภาคตะวันออกเฉียงเหนือ), the East (ภาคตะวันออก), and the South (ภาคใต้). The revision and judgement is carried out by Phech Mar (เพชร มาร์), Sutheesak Pakdeetewa (สุธีศักดิ์ ภักดีเทวา) and Ornapha Krisadee (อรนภา กฤษฎี). The people selected will compete with other agencies to find the eight people to compete in the final.

The final 8 competitors will then have an opportunity to compete live on stage, which is hosted every Wednesday in season 1, and every weekend in season 2 to 12. The scores are calculated from two places, one from the people in the concert, which represents 10% of the total score, while the other 90% comes from votes sent by audiences watching on live on TV (via SMS, and Application since season 9) -that the program usually announced current score votes in the midweek day throughout the first half of the season- in which both places may send as many as they can during the concert time. After debuting week, Once the singing from the competitors is complete, the host will count the votes and declare the competitor with the fewest votes. The latter then is eliminated, in season 2 to season 12, the eliminated competitor will sing one last song before ultimately leaving. The elimination process takes place once a week until there were only 2 contestants left. Final result day were usually hold along with "ending ceremony concert" that all of 8 contestants from that season were reunion and hold the concert together, and later season were usually joined by senior or past contestants from previous season. The winner of the competition is given the chance to sign a contract and become an artist at GMM Grammy.

Since season 12, the recruitment ultimately changed to be recruits only in Bangkok and an "Online Audition" that requires sending a singing video. Competitors who qualified from both formats will advance to the preliminary round. The final preliminary round will be competed live on stage, followed by a live announcement of the final 8 competitors. Other than that, the scores are now calculated from three places: one from the people in the concert, which represents 10% of the total score; one from the judges that have 10 points per person, for a total of 30 points, which also represents 10% of the total score; and the other 80% comes from votes sent by audiences watching live on TV (via SMS and Application). This season was also the first season not to include a debuting week.

after 5 years hiatus, In The Star Idol, the recruitment are similar to season 12, but don't have the walk-in auditions due to COVID-19 pandemic. Competitors who qualified from the first preliminary round are come to perform in front of the judges, and find out the twenty people to compete in the next competitions until the last twelve, and later the last eight competitors will be compete live in studio. The scores are changes again that calculated from three places, one from the judges, which represents 40% of the total score, one from the guest artist that maybe the other artists, or the senior (previous contestants from the last 12 seasons). They represents 10% of total score. And the other 50% comes from votes sent by audiences watching on live on TV (via SMS, Application, and Websites).

In The Star 2022, the recruitment is similar to the first eleven seasons, and the final eight competitors are back to compete live on stage. The scores are similar to season 12 and are calculated from three places: one from the people in the concert, which represents 10% of the total score; one from the judges, which represents 30% of the total score; and the other 60% comes from votes sent by audiences watching live on TV (via SMS, Application, and Websites). Except for the final week, there were no studio score votes and no commentator's score. All 100% of the score votes are from the audience.

== The presenters and commentator ==
=== Presenters ===
Key:

Current presenter of The Star
Previous presenter of The Star

Presenter	Season 1	Season 2	Season 3	Season 4	Season 5	Season 6	Season 7	Season 8	Season 9	Season 10	Season 11	Season 12	Idol	2022
Natthaweeranuch Thongmee														
Panomkorn Tangtatswas														
Nobporn Kamtornjarean		Substituted												
Pakhachon Wo-onsri														
Ekkachai Euasangkomsert														
Warawut Poyim									Contestants					
Perawat Sangpotirat														

- In The Star 1, Pakhachon Wo-onsri was the backstage team and one of the announcer, and he later joins as presenter starting in The Star 2 onwards.
- In The Star 2, Panomkorn Tangtatswas was the presenter only during the audition and preliminary round, before replaced by Ekkachai Euasangkomsert starting the live debuting week onwards.
- In one week of The Star 2, Nobporn Kamtornjarean was stepped in as the substituted presenter for Pakhachon Wo-onsri due the latter got married on the day that program has live.

=== Commentator ===
Key:

Current Commentator of The Star
Previous Commentator of The Star

Presenter	Season 1	Season 2	Season 3	Season 4	Season 5	Season 6	Season 7	Season 8	Season 9	Season 10	Season 11	Season 12	Idol	2022
Phech Mar														
Sutheesak Pakdeetewa														
Ornapha Krisadee														
Pongsak Rattanapong														
Metinee Kingpayom														
Yuttana Boon-om														
Songyos Sugmakanan														
Lydia Sarunrat Deane														
Tanont Chumroen														
Noppasin Sangsuwan														
Thanida Thummawimol														
Jaruwat Cheawaram								Contestants						

== List of winners and runners-up of The Star ==
Season	Winner		Runner-up		Appointment
Season	Number	Name	Number	Name	Appointment
The Star 1	4	Sonthaya Chidmanee	6	Piyanut Suajongpu	20 January 2004
The Star 2	5	Attapon Prakobkong	8	Ronnawee Serirat	31 October 2004
The Star 3	4	Arnattapon Sirichumsang	8	Sukrit Wisetkaew	30 April 2006
The Star 4	4	Wichayanee Pearklin	8	Suparuj Taechatanont	27 April 2008
The Star 5	4	Singharat Chanpakdee	5	Pongsatorn Supinyo	3 May 2009
The Star 6	3	Napat Injaieua	8	Rungrit Siriphanich	2 May 2010
The Star 7	1	Yuttana Puangklang	6	Note Panayanggool	1 May 2011
The Star 8	1	Jaruwat Cheawaram	8	Tanatat Chaiyaat	29 April 2012
The Star 9	8	Warawut Poyim	2	Korakot Tunkaew	28 April 2013
The Star 10	3	Vorakorn Sirisorn	1	Teera Janyasirigoon	27 April 2014
The Star 11	5	Radabdaw Srirawong	6	Linpitta Jindapu	26 April 2015
The Star 12	8	Kritsada Jandee	3	Pornchanok Liankattawa	22 May 2016
The Star Idol	7	Saharat Tiampan	4	Phongratchata Chaisiwamongkhol	5 December 2021
The Star 2022	8	Jettapol Kanittachat	3	Yanathip Jaijul	22 January 2023

Male
Female

== By city tally ==
Rank	City	The Star	1st runner-up	2nd runner-up	3rd runner-up	4th runner-up	Total
1	Bangkok	3	2	5	4	4	18
2	Chiang Mai	2	5	0	3	2	12
3	Phuket	2	0	0	0	1	3
4	Udon Thani	2	0	0	0	0	2
5	Khon Kaen	1	1	1	0	0	3
6	Songkhla	1	0	0	1	1	3
7=	Nakhon Sawan	1	0	0	0	0	1
7=	Ratchaburi	1	0	0	0	0	1
7=	Suphan Buri	1	0	0	0	0	1

== Winner by provinces ==
Region Thailand	Titles	Winning Years
Central &East	5	2010, 2011, 2014, 2021, 2023
South	4	2003, 2008, 2012, 2013
Isan	3	2006, 2009, 2015
North	2	2004, 2016

== Theme song ==
Phuer Dow Douang Nan (Thai: เพื่อดาวดวงนั้น) is the theme song for The Star since Season 2, and become one of iconics of the program. The last 8 contestants must sing this song in the debuting week. The song's lyrics is composed by Wiwat Chatthiraphap and melody composed by Weerapat Ungamporn, with new compositions each year, that make each season had the own difference theme. Before the debuting week, contestants had filmed the music video of the song. Except season 12, due the schedule conflict. And season 2022, which had only the audio version instead.

- In Season 1, The Star used Jud Nut Fun' (Thai: จุดนัดฝัน) for the theme song, that had only audio version.
- In Season 2, the music video was released after the competition was concluded, other season were released between debuting week and 1st week instead.

== The Star Season 1 (October 7, 2002 - Any 22, 2003) ==
=== Eliminated chart ===
Number	Name	score 100 vote in studio							Status
Number	Name	1	2	3	4	5	6	7	Status
*4	Son – Sonthaya Chidmanee	26	37	27	19	48	42	51	Winner (Slow Song & Fast Song)
*6	Jiew – Piyanut Suajongpu	36	25	28	9	19	46	49	Runner-up (Slow Song & Fast Song)
*2	Biew – Pongpipat Kongnak	13	9	20	9	8	12		Slow Song & Fast Song
*8	New – Napassorn Putornjai	12	9	9	56	25			Acoustic (2 songs)
*3	Bell – Karnpriya Wutisingchai	0	8	6	7				Thai Folk (2 songs)
*1	Nat – Yoot Boriboon	1	9	10					Rock
*7	Koy – Kannika Somsuparp	9	3						Fast Song
*5	Bump – Narongklod Naprasert	3							Slow Song

Male
Female

- The Star 1 was the one of two seasons (along with The Star 3) to didn't include duet song round.
- The Star 1 also was the one of two seasons (along with The Star Idol) to didn't included mini concert round.
- As usual, last contestant that continue to the next round (that shown in orange label) in the later seasons are random. But in The Star 1 and The Star 2, last contestant were mean the contestant who had the second fewest score, what is fixed person in that time.
- The Star 1 had the most closed studio score votes of final round to date. With 51 scores for Son and 49 scores for Jew.

== The Star Season 2 (July 7, 2004 - Any 22, 2005) ==
=== Eliminated chart ===
Number	Name	score 100 vote in studio							Status
Number	Name	1	2*	3	4	5	6	7	Status
*5	M – Attapon Prakobkong	30	17	14	29	50	45	52	Winner (Mini Concert 30 Minutes)
*8	Nick – Ronnawee Serirat	28	26	26	12	22	37	48	Runner-Up (Mini Concert 30 Minutes)
*4	Pete – Pol Nopvichai	10	6	7	8	10	18		Mini Concert 20 Minutes
*2	Earn – Surattikarn Pakcharuen	14	21	30	33	18			Duet Song & Acoustic
*1	Baitoey – Pimpan Janudom	7	11	10	18				Rock (2 songs)
*7	Us – Chananya Tangboonjit	4	10	13					Thai Folk
*3	Palm – Teewara Pawaprom	6	5						Fast Song
*6	Nong – Natnalee Suraplanun	1							Slow Song

Male
Female

- Starting from this season. The Star had been increased the air time from only Wednesday to Saturday and Sunday.
- As usual, last contestant that continue to the next round (that shown in orange label) in the later seasons are random. But in The Star 1 and The Star 2, last contestant were mean the contestant who had the second fewest score, what is fixed person in that time.
- In the 2nd week, there were 4 invalid cards, made total votes were only 96 votes.
- The Star 2 was one of two seasons (along with The Star 5) that ending ceremony concery in final result day weren't join by any senior contestant. All of concert were hold from only 8 contestants in this season (didn't count The Star 1 that not had senior).
- The Star 2 had the most closed revealed total score votes of final round to date. With 50.81% for M and 49.19% for Nick.

== The Star Season 3 (February 4, 2006 - Any 22, 2007) ==
=== Eliminated chart ===
Number	Name	score 100 vote in studio							Status
Number	Name	1	2	3	4	5	6	7	Status
*4	R – Arnattapon Sirichumsang	11	31	16	46	35	51	76	Winner (Mini Concert 30 Minutes)
*8	Bie – Sukrit Wisetkaew	7	8	6	4	15	31	24	Runner-up (Mini Concert 30 Minutes)
*1	Mew – Preechaya Pinmuangngam	7	17	19	22	34	18		Mini Concert 20 Minutes
*6	Aue – Aueaarthorn Juntawee	24	8	22	23	16			Music of Thongchai McIntyre (2 songs)
*3	Pol – Ampol Juntanoy	10	18	26	5				Rock (2 songs)
*5	Ju – Sirinapa Anektanarojkul	14	9	11					Thai Folk
*7	NookNick-Thitinan Suksom	15	9						Pop Dance
*2	Looktarn-Wanticha Tichinpong	12							Slow Pop

Male
Female

- The Star 3 was the one of two seasons (along with The Star 1) to didn't include duet song round.
- with 6 weeks out of 7 weeks. Bie has the lowest score votes in studio the most times.
- With 76 points, R was the one of two contestants that holds the record for being the contestant with the most votes in the studio in 7th week, along with Matang from The Star 11.
- Coincidentally, the final 2 contestants of this season —R and Bie— were come from the same province with the final 2 contestants of The Star 11 —Matang and Ying respectively — and they gots the same place each other.

== The Star Season 4 (February 2 - April 27, 2008) ==
=== Eliminated chart ===
Number	Name	score 100 vote in studio							Status
Number	Name	1	2	3	4	5	6	7	Status
*4	Gam – Wichayanee Pearklin	39	16	9	27	42	44	60	Winner (Mini Concert 35 Minutes)
*8	Ruj – Suparuj Taechatanont	20	21	17	21	18	42	40	Runner-up (Mini Concert 35 Minutes)
*1	Ton – Chayathorn Setthajinda	8	18	28	18	27	14		Mini Concert 25 Minutes
*5	Dew – Alongkorn Tonnongdu	3	12	15	16	13			The Star's Dong & Duet Song
*6	May – Paweesuda Chunkes	11	14	22	18				Slow Pop & Pop Dance
*3	Max – Jirayuth Kanthayoth*	8	15	9					Rock
*7	Pang – Nutnicha Tipyamonton	4	4						Thai Folk
*2	Pat – Pornpat Korkiattrakul	7							Be Myself

Male
Female

- The Star 4 was the only season in the first nine seasons to show the contestants in random order without sorting by their number, starting in the 2nd week afterwards. Other aforementioned seasons are sorted and rolated contestants's order to shown by their number during the first half of the season.
- The Star 4's ending ceremony concert were present the fewest number of senior contestant to date, featured only Bie from The Star 3.
- Max replaces Narm - Siranee Thongniyom, who withdrawn from the competition to recover from leukemia, and she later died on March 31, 2008, one day after 4th-week result.

== The Star Season 5 (February 7 - May 3, 2009) ==
=== Eliminated chart ===
Number	Name	score 100 vote in studio							Status
Number	Name	1	2	3	4	5	6	7	Status
*4	Singto – Singharat Chanpakdee	8	11	23	13	25	57	53	Winner (Mini Concert 35 Minutes)
*5	Dew – Pongsatorn Supinyo	36	37	29	40	20	34	47	Runner-up (Mini Concert 35 Minutes)
*2	Fluke – Pachara Tammol	3	6	13	10	33	9		Mini Concert 25 Minutes
*8	Ging – Muenpair Panabut	19	17	13	11	22			The Star's Song & Duet Song
*3	Grand – Panvarod Duaysianklao	3	8	18	26				Slow Pop & Pop Dance
*6	Nut -Nuttamon Kritsanakupt	7	11	4					Thai Folk
*1	Namtarn – Butsarun Tongchiew †	3	10						Rock
*7	So – Solos Assawalarbsakul	21							Be Myself

Male
Female

- Singto was the last *4 number contestant that remained on the show more than 3 weeks until Can of The Star 8 broke this coincidence.
- The Star 5 was the only season that held the final concert and results at Thunder Dome, after Impact Arena and Indoor Stadium —the two locations that were used in the past seasons— were busy at the time.
- The Star 5 was one of two seasons (along with The Star 2) that ending ceremony concery in final result day weren't join by any senior contestant. All of concert were hold from only 8 contestants in this season (didn't count The Star 1 that not had senior).

== The Star Season 6 (February 13 - May 2, 2010) ==
=== Eliminated chart ===
Number	Name	score 100 vote in studio							Status
Number	Name	1	2	3	4	5	6	7	Status
*3	Gun – Napat Injaiuea	18	15	25	28	47	41	58	Winner (Mini Concert 30 Minutes)
*8	Rit – Rueangrit Siriphanich	18	11	11	32	25	36	42	Runner-Up (Mini Concert 30 Minutes)
*6	Tono – Pakin Khumwilaisuk	25	19	19	2	23	23		Mini Concert 15 Minutes
*5	Zen – Patiphan Lowsathian	11	9	19	28	5			The Star's Song & Senior Duet Song
*1	Kate – Chinapak Piaklin	11	16	18	10				Slow Pop & Pop Dance
*7	Grace – Navakotchamon Chunkrongtum	8	16	8					Thai Folk
*2	Ice – Nattapat Tananonkittiyot	4	14						Rock
*4	Geng – Wayo Assawarungruang	5							2009 - 2010 Hits

Male
Female

- The Star 6 was the one of two seasons (along with The Star 8) to not have any female contestants in the last 4 contestants.
- Coincidentally, The last five contestants in this season were the same number with The Star 7.
- this season's last three contestants also were the same number with The Star 12.

== The Star Season 7 (February 5 - May 1, 2011) ==
=== Eliminated chart ===
Number	Name	score 100 vote in studio							Status
Number	Name	1	2	3	4	5	6	7	Status
*1	Toomtam – Yuttana Puangklang	5	11	35	11	14	20	28	Winner (Mini Concert 30 Minutes)
*6	Note – Note Panayangool	32	14	16	18	37	51	72	Runner-Up (Mini Concert 30 Minutes)
*5	Amp – Siripong Chusaksakulwiboon	7	16	24	53	16	29		Mini Concert 15 Minutes
*3	Kwang – Gorawan Suttiwong	16	28	4	16	33			Musical Dong & Duet Song
*8	Nes – Yuttana Kanil	13	8	11	2				The Star's Song & Pop Dance
*4	Silvy – Pavida Moriggi	13	19	10					Thai Folk
*7	Apple – Aidanik Intarasut	3	4						Retro Song
*2	Junior – Kornrawich Sungkitbool	11							2010 - 2011 Hits

Male
Female

- The Star 7 was the one of four seasons (along with The Star 10, The Star 12, and The Star 2022) to didn't include rock song round.
- Coincidentally, The last five contestants in this season were the same number with The Star 6.
- With 4 persons —Note, Kwang, Toomtam, and Amp respectively—, making The Star 7, along with The Star 8 and The Star 10, had the highest number of contestants receiving the highest number of votes in the studio.

== The Star Season 8 (February 11 - April 29, 2012) ==
=== Eliminated chart ===
Number	Name	score 100 vote in studio							Status
Number	Name	1	2	3	4	5	6	7	Status
*1	Dome – Jaruwat Cheawaram	16	25	19	44	33	14	71	Winner (Mini Concert 30 Minutes)
*8	Kangsom – Tanatat Chaiyaat	25	23	9	8	25	23	29	Runner-Up (Mini Concert 30 Minutes)
*2	Hunz – Isariya Phataramanop	17	23	21	13	18	63		Mini Concert 15 Minutes
*4	Can – Atirut Kittipattana	6	16	43	27	24			Musical & Rock
*6	Smile – Soraya Thitawachira	7	2	4	8				The Star's Song & Duet Song
*5	Stop – Warittha Chaturapush	5	7	4					Thai Folk
*7	Hut – Jiravich Pongpaijit	16	4						Dance Song
*3	Frame – Supakchaya Sukbaiyen	8							2011 - 2012 Hits

Male
Female

- With 4 persons —Kangsom, Dome, Can, and Hunz respectively—, making The Star 8, along with The Star 7 and The Star 10, had the highest number of contestants receiving the highest number of votes in the studio.
- Can was the only *4 number contestant remain on the show more than 3 weeks since Singto from The Star 5. until Poom of The Star Idol also broke this coincidence too.
- Hunz is the first contestant who eliminated in the round that they got highest score votes in studio.

== The Star Season 9 (January 19 - April 28, 2013) ==
=== Eliminated chart ===
Number	Contestant	score 100 vote in studio							Status/ Style music of week
Number	Contestant	1	2	3*	4	5	6	7	Status/ Style music of week
*8	Tum – Warawut Poyim	56	19	56	5	33	60	57	Winner (Mini Concert 30 Minutes)
*2	Aon – Korakot Tunkaew	8	10	21	23	19	22	43	Runner-up (Mini Concert 30 Minutes)
*1	Dee – Delilian Alford	3	36	11	57	39	18		Mini Concert 15 Minutes
*5	Bambi – Sirinsopit Pachimsawat	1	2	2	3	9			Dance & Duet Song
*3	Boon – Tanyaboon Wongwasin	0	18	2	3				OST. and Musical
*7	Dew – Nattapong Promsing	13	8	8	9				OST. and Musical
*4	Chris – Christopher Jonathan Roy Chaafe	12	7						Rock
*6	Cherreen – Nutjaree Horvejkul	7							2012 – 2013 Hits

Male
Female

- The Star 9 was the last season that aired in 4:3 format.
- The Star 9 is the only season to have a peninsula on the stage.
- In the 3rd week, Thai Folk song. During Boon's show, there was a technical malfunction. That causes everyone in the studio can't hear Boon's voice throughout his show, but didn't effect to commentator's headphone and audience from TV. Later, the program announced that all contestants could continue to the next week without elimination. All vote scores will be added to the following week, which will have the 2 contestants with the fewest score eliminate.
- With only 2 persons —Tum and Dee respectively—, making The Star 9, along with The Star 11, had the fewest number of contestants receiving the highest number of votes in the studio.
- With 56 points, Tum holds the record for being the contestant with the most votes in the studio in 3rd week.
- Aon is the only *2 number contestants thats made it to the final round to date.
- Chris is the only pure foreigner that become the final 8 contestants. He is an Australian that lived in Thailand.

== The Star Season 10 (February 1 - April 26, 2014) ==
=== Eliminated chart ===
Number	Name	score 100 vote in studio							Status
Number	Name	1	2	3	4	5	6	7	Status
*3	Kang – Vorakorn Sirisorn	9	23	12	11	30	25	29	Winner (Mini Concert 30 Minutes)
*1	Tae – Teera Janyasirigoon	3	21	30	7	25	54	71	Runner-up (Mini Concert 30 Minutes)
*5	CD – Guntee Pitithan	15	12	3	5	9	21		Mini Concert 15 Minutes
*8	Mook – Nutnicha Chomdee	10	4	12	60	36			OST. and Musical & Senior Duet Song
*2	Tum – Suton Boosarmsai	9	14	19	17				Slow Pop & Pop Dance
*4	Amen – Amen Sotthibandhu Komeluecha	15	4	24					Retro Song
*6	Natt – Nattawadee Dokkathin	38	22						Thai Folk
*7	Bew – Shananya Sandej	1							Hits Song

Male
Female

- The Star 10 was the first season that aired in widescreen 16:9 format. And the last one that aired on Modernine TV.
- The Star 10 was the last season that helds competitions at Moonstar Studio, that always holds here since The Star 1.
- The Star 10 was the one of four seasons (along with The Star 7, The Star 12, and The Star 2022) to didn't include rock song round.
- After using this format before in season 4, The Star 10 was the first season that change to random the contestants' order to shown permanently.

* However, after removed the debuting week in The Star 12, making the first week of The Star 12 and The Star 2022 were still sorted contestants's order to shown.

- With 4 persons —Nut, Kang, Tae, and Mook respectively—, making The Star 10, along with The Star 7 and The Star 8, had the highest number of contestants receiving the highest number of votes in the studio.
- Tae is the last *1 number contestant that remains on the show more than 2 weeks to date.
- The Star 10's ending ceremony concert were the only season that not featured any senior contestant from The Star 6 since before the introduction of season 6.

* This also mark the only season that Gam from The Star 4 were absent from ending ceremony concert. However, she still appeared in this season in Senior Duet round, where she were paired with Tae, and as a guest senior in week 6 result day.

== The Star Season 11 (January 17 - April 26, 2015) ==
=== Eliminated chart ===
Number	Contestant	score 100 vote in studio							Status/ Style music of week
Number	Contestant	1	2	3	4	5	6	7	Status/ Style music of week
*5	Matang-Radabdaw Srirawong	51	27	38	75	58	80	76	Winner (Mini Concert 30 Minutes)
*6	Ying-Linpitta Jindapu	3	7	10	0	2	6	24	Runner-up (Mini Concert 30 Minutes)
*7	Grace-Kewalin Poolpreekrai	24	31	16	21	36	14		Mini Concert 15 Minutes
*2	Eak-Thanachot Kusumrotnanan	2	7	17	4	4			OST. and Musical & Party Song
*3	Jungjing-Prachaya Nangrak	11	19	5	0				Music of Thongchai McIntyre
*8	JJ-Passapong Koonkamjorn	1	2	14					Duet Song
*4	Pua-Kittipong Pluempredaporn	3	7						Thai Folk
*1	May-Nuengrhythai Issaard	5							Rock

Male
Female

- Starting from this season, Tum – Warawut Poyim —winner from The Star 9— has been add to be the third presenters.
- Starting from this season. The Star had been moved to be aired on One 31.
- Starting from this season. The Star had been moved to be hold the competition at GMM Live House @ CentralWorld.
- Starting from this season. The Star had been reduced the show in 4th week, from 2 shows from each contestants, now only 1 show from each.
- The Star 11 was the only season to didn't have any male contestants in the last 3 contestants.
- Grace was the first *7 number contestant thats remain on the show more than 4 week.
- Pua was the only male contestants thats eliminated in Thai Folk round. All other contestants that were eliminated in the aforementioned round were female.
- This season had the highest and fewest ever total studio score votes of all week of the last 2 contestants. With 405 scores for Matang, and 52 scores for Ying.
- Throughout this season, Matang got many various records, such as:

* She got a highest ever score vote from the studio in a week, with 80 scores in 6th week.
* With 75 points, she also holds the record for being the contestant with the most votes in the studio in 4th week.
* With 76 points, she was the one of two contestants that holds the record for being the contestant with the most votes in the studio in 7th week, along with R from The Star 3.
* with 6 weeks out of 7 weeks. she also has the highest score votes in studio the most times.
* With 15 years and 127 days old at the time. she also had been the youngest winner to date.

- Coincidentally, the final 2 contestants of this season —Matang and Ying— were come from the same province with the final 2 contestants of The Star 3 —R and Bie respectively— and they gots the same place each other.
- With only 2 persons —Matang and Grace respectively—, making The Star 11, along with The Star 9, had the fewest number of contestants receiving the highest number of votes in the studio.
- The Star 11's ending ceremony concert were present the highest number of senior contestant to date. With 10 senior contestants —R from The Star 3, Gam from The Star 4, Grand from The Star 5, Gun and Tono from The Star 6, Kangsom from The Star 8, Tum and Aon From the Star 9, and Kang and CD from The Star 10— were featured.

* This also mark the only season that Dome from The Star 8 were absent from ending ceremony concert. However, he still appeared in this season in week 1's result date and special performs in week 6 as a guest senior.

- The Star 11 was also the last season to date that helds the final concert and results at Impact Arena after previously holds here from The Star 2-3, and The Star 7 onwards.
- The Star 11 was the last season to date that includes Phech Mar, Sutheesak Pakdeetewa, and Ornapha Krisadee as commentators, after they had been since The Star 1.

== The Star Season 12 (February 13, 2016 - May 22, 2016) ==
=== Eliminated chart ===
Number	Name	score 100 vote in studio							Status
Number	Name	1	2	3	4	5	6	7	Status
*8	Big – Kritsada Jandee	19	51	6	9	10	65	74	Winner (Mini Concert 30 Minutes)
*3	Pin – Pornchanok Liankattawa	7	25	8	10	25	15	26	Runner-up (Mini Concert 30 Minutes)
*6	Jumbo – Worakrit Worakul	13	4	23	14	18	20		Mini Concert 15 Minutes
*7	Preen – Rawitsararat Phibulphanuwattana	49	3	31	65	47			Song written by Boyd Kosiyabong & Thai Folk
*5	Net – Panutsaya Kittikathakul	0	4	1	2				Duet Song
*4	Jenny – Ratiphan Phanphinit	10	9	31					Legend of grammy
*1	Namphueng – Thananya Rakkaew	1	4						The Star Party
*2	Tongtong – Kritsakorn Kanoktorn	1							Be Myself

Male
Female

- The Star 12 was the one of two seasons (along with The Star 2022) to didn't use original star-shaped A logo.
- The Star 12 also was the one of four seasons (along with The Star 7, The Star 10, and The Star 2022) to didn't include rock song round.
- The Star 12 also was the only season since The Star 7 that didn't includes OST. and/or Musical round.
- The Star 12 also was the last season to date that includes Thai Folk round.
- With 51 points, Big holds the record for being the contestant with the most votes in the studio in 2nd week.
- The Star 12's 3rd week was the only time that had 2 contentants that got the most votes from studio from the same week, Jenny and Preen's 31 scores.
- The Star 12 also was the last season to date that includes Ekkachai Euasangkomsert as presenter, after he had been since The Star 2.
- Following the conclusion of The Star 12, this marks the end of original era of The Star.

== The Star Idol (August 22 - December 5, 2021) ==
=== Eliminated chart ===
Number	Name	ranking before the show						Status
Number	Name	1	2	3	4	5	6	Status
*7	Boom - Saharat Tiampan	2	1	2	2	2		Winner
*4	Poom - Phongratchata Chaisiwamongkhol	5	5	5	4	1		Runner-up
*3	O - Natsuttha Saransiriborirak	7	6	1	1	3		100,000,000 views Song & OST. and Musical
*5	Earn Earn - Fatima Dechawalikul	6	2	4	3			Duet Song
*8	Copper - Dechawat Pradechapipat	1	4	3				Dance
*6	Korn - Palatt Chayutnitiroj	4	3					Rock
*1	Maddoc - Maddoc Davies	8						Be Myself
*2	Pim - Nitchaya Unonthakarn	3						Be Myself

Male
Female

- Due to COVID-19 pandemic, making The Star Idol was the only season that live in closed stidio, rather than in concert hall. The program moved to holds the competition in Acts Studio.
- Starting from this season. The Star had been reduced the air time from Saturday and Sunday to only Sunday.
- This season was also the only season to didn't have any break week.
- This season was also been the shortest season to date. With only 6 week (Didn't include the preliminary rounds).
- The Star Idol also was the one of two seasons (along with The Star 1) to didn't included mini concert round.
- The Star Idol was the first season since The Star 8, with *4 number contestant remain on the show more than 3 weeks.
- Boom is the only *7 number contestants thats made it to the final round to date.
- With 14 years old at the time. Maddoc had been the youngest contestant during the competitions to date.
- Coincidentally, all contestants who had the third place of ranking scores before the show were all eliminated in those week.

== The Star 2022 (October 23, 2022 - January 22, 2023) ==
=== Eliminated chart ===
Number	Name	score 100 vote in studio							Status
Number	Name	1	2	3	4	5	6	7*	Status
*8	James – Jettapol Kanittachat	20	49	27	12	71	41		Winner (Mini Concert 15 Minutes)
*3	Chinjung – Yanathip Jaijul	10	2	26	16	10	35		1st Runner-Up (Mini Concert 15 Minutes)
*2	Sam – Samuel Dubpradit Acubia	2	13	37	40	8	24		2nd Runner-Up (100,000,000 views Song & Duet Song)
*7	Mee – Punyada Panitpojaman	59	9	10	15	11			3rd Runner-Up (The Star's Song & Commentator's Song)
*5	Artist – Thanakorn Yathklang	3	8	0	17				4th Runner-Up (Countdown Party)
*4	Shane – Pacharachet Techaarikul	2	2	0					5th Runner-Up (OST.)
*1	Pangpond – Suriyakul Phromsen	3	17						6th Runner-Up (Cassette Song)
*6	Salee – Somvimala Na Ubol	1							7th Runner-Up (Be Myself)

Male
Female

- The Star 2022 was the one of two seasons (along with The Star 12) to didn't use original star-shaped A logo.
- The Star 2022 was the one of four seasons (along with The Star 7, The Star 10, and The Star 12) to didn't include rock song round.
- In the 7th week, there were no studio score vote and commentator's score. All of 100% score votes were from audience.
- Noppasin Sangsuwan is the first commentators since three commentators from first eleven seasons that still been present as commentator more than 1 season.
- Warawut Poyim also been reinstated as presenters after he has been removed in The Star Idol.
- With 29 years old at the time. Shane had been the oldest contestant during the competitions to date.
- With 27 years and 58 days old at the time. James had been the oldest winner to date.
- With 59 points, Mee holds the record for being the contestant with the most votes in the studio in 1st week.
- With 71 points, James holds the record for being the contestant with the most votes in the studio in 5th week.
- James was the longest contestant who debuted and became to the final 8 contestants from all season. He made his debuted on The Star 10 and made it all the way until the final preliminary round where he eliminated. with a gap almost 10 years.
