= Pure Intention =

2018 Thai television series

- Also known as: Prom Mai Dai Likit; Unwritten Destiny; Destiny is not Written
- Original title: พรหมไม่ได้ลิขิต
- Genre: Romance Drama
- Created by: Srifa Mahawan
- Written by: Srifa Mahawan; Pranpramoon
- Directed by: Karun Kumanuwong
- Starring: Esther Supreeleela; Sukrit Wisetkaew
- Country of origin: Thailand
- Original language: Thai
- No. of episodes: 27

Production
- Cinematography: Tanai Nimchareonpong
- Running time: 50 minutes
- Production company: The One Enterprises Co. Ltd.

Original release
- Network: One 31
- Release: October 24 – December 10, 2018

Pure Intention (Thai: พรหมไม่ได้ลิขิต; RTGS: Prom Mai Dai Likit; lit. 'Unwritten Destiny') is a 2018 Thai romance drama television series. It premiered on One 31 every Mondays thru Thursdays at 20:10. It starred Esther Supreeleela and Sukrit Wisetkaew.

== Synopsis ==
Orachun (Sukrit Wisetkaew), a wealthy patient, falls in love with Karakade (Esther Supreeleela), a nurse. Karakade's devotion is hard to return, though, because he prefers to follow truth rather than fate.

== Cast ==
Main

- Sukrit Wisetkaew as Orachun/On
- Esther Supreeleela as Karakade/Kade

Supporting

- Akk Akarat Nimitchai as Dr. Nipit/Nit
- Natapat Wipataradachtragoon as Cattleya/Cat
- Rathfar Chaichueanjit as Jaisawang
- Chinawut Indracusin as Puwadol/Pu
- Pantila Win Pansirithanachote as Parichat/Pa
- Pharunyoo Rojanawuttitham as Dr. Thikamporn
- Uthumporn Silaphan as Chuensri
- Prima Ratchata as Sirilak
- Moo Dilok Thongwattana as Amnuay
- Mink Nattarinee Karnasuta as Yai
- Tao Sarocha Watittapan as Samonming/Mon
- Toon Panisara Prinyarux as Yaowadee
- Preen Ravisrarat Pibulpanuvat as Waewjan
- Wiwat Phasomsab as Dr. Oab

Guest

- Aerin Yuktadatta as Christy
- Meaw Pawanrat Naksuriya as Metta, Karakade's aunt
- James Bhuripat Vejvongsatechawat as Ben

== Release ==
Pure Intention was broadcast on Thai television network One 31 on October 24 until December 10, 2018.

It was also broadcast in the same time on China via Tencent, Hong Kong on Viu and in Malaysia on Dimsum channel.

It was broadcast in the Philippines on March 15, 2021 on GMA Network's sister channel GTV. In 2022, it was re-aired on Heart of Asia Channel on August 20, 2022.
