= The Star season 11 =

- The Star (Season 11)
- Broadcast
- 11 January 2015-26 April 2015
- Judges
- Phech Mar; Sutheesak Pakdeetewa; Ornapha Krisadee
- Hosts
- Pakhachon Woonsri; Ekkachai Euasangkomsert; Warawut Poyim
- The Star 11 Contestants
Name	Enrolled	Exited
Matang-Radabdaw Srirawong	February 14	Winner
Ying-Linpitta Jindapu	February 14	Runners-up
Grace-Kewalin Poolpreekrai	February 14	April 19
Eak-Thanachot Kusumrotnanan	February 14	April 5
Jungjing-Prachaya Nangrak	February 14	March 30
JJ-Passapong Koonkamjorn	February 14	March 22
Pua-Kittipong Pluempredaporn	February 14	March 14
May-Nuengrhythai Issaard	February 14	March 8
- Legend
- Winner
- Runners-up
- Elimination

The Star (season 11) (Thai: เดอะสตาร์ ค้นฟ้าคว้าดาว) was the eleventh season of The Star, a singing competition produced by Exact, a GMM Grammy Company. Preliminary auditions took place during November to December, and broadcast on One HD, began on 17 January 2015. The season concluded on 26 April 2015

== Preliminary auditions ==
Audition city	Audition Date	Venue
Bangkok	November 1–2 and 8, 2013	Muangthai Rachadalai Theatre
Phuket	November 15, 2012	The Metropole Hotel
Chiang Mai	November 22, 2012	Jareon Thani Hotel
Khon Kaen	November 29, 2012	Lotus Hotel Pang Suan Kaew

== Contestants ==
Order of competition numbers

Code Number.	Name		Birthday	Hometown	2 Finalist
Code Number.	Nickname	Name	Birthday	Hometown	2 Finalist
1	May	Nuengrhythai Issaard	29 November 1992	Bangkok	Eliminated in Week 1
2	Eak	Thanachot Kusumrotnanan	1 January 1994	Bangkok	Eliminated in Week 5
3	Jungjing	Prachaya Nangrak	23 October 1994	Chiangrai	Eliminated in Week 4
4	Pua	Kittipong Pluempredaporn	25 May 1990	Phayao	Eliminated in Week 2
5	Matang	Radabdaw Srirawong	20 December 1999	Udon Thani	Winner
6	Ying	Linpitta Jindapu	29 June 1991	Chiangmai	Runners-up
7	Grace	Kewalin Poolpreekrai	23 May 1998	Phitsanulok	Eliminated in Week 6
8	JJ	Passapong Koonkamjorn	10 October 1996	Bangkok	Eliminated in Week 3

== Eliminated Chart ==
Number	Contestant	score 100 vote in studio							Status/ Style music of week
Number	Contestant	1	2	3	4	5	6	7	Status/ Style music of week
*5	Matang-Radabdaw Srirawong	51	27	38	75	58	80	76	Winner
*6	Ying-Linpitta Jindapu	3	7	10	0	2	6	24	Runner-up
*7	Grace-Kewalin Poolpreekrai	24	31	16	21	36	14		Mini Concert 15 minutes
*2	Eak-Thanachot Kusumrotnanan	2	7	17	4	4			OST. and Musical
*3	Jungjing-Prachaya Nangrak	11	19	5	0				Music of Thongchai McIntyre
*8	JJ-Passapong Koonkamjorn	1	2	14					Duets with artists
*4	Pua-Kittipong Pluempredaporn	3	7						Thai Folk song
*1	May-Nuengrhythai Issaard	5							Rock

Male
Female

Green number indicate the 100 vote in studio highest score for each week.
Red number indicate the 100 vote in studio lowest score for each week.
indicates the Contestants eliminated that week.
indicates the returning Contestants that finished in the bottom two.
indicates the winner of the competition.
indicates the runner-up of the competition.

=== Call-out order ===
Ekkachai's Call-Out Order
Order	Episodes						
Order	1	2	3	4	5	6	7
1	Ying	Grace	Jungjing	Ying	Ying	Matang	Matang
2	Matang	Matang	Grace	Matang	Grace	Ying	Ying
3	JJ	Ying	Ying	Eak	Matang	Grace	
4	Eak	Jungjing	Eak	Grace	Eak		
5	Grace	JJ	Matang	Jungjing			
6	Pua	Eak	JJ				
7	Jungjing	Pua					
8	May						

Red number indicate the 100 vote in studio lowest score for each week.
Green number indicate the 100 vote in studio highest score for each week.
The contestant was eliminated
indicates the winner of the competition.
indicates the runner-up of the competition.
