= Saharat Hiranthanapuwadol =

Saharat Hiranthanapuwadol สหรัฐต์ หิรัญญ์ธนภูวดล
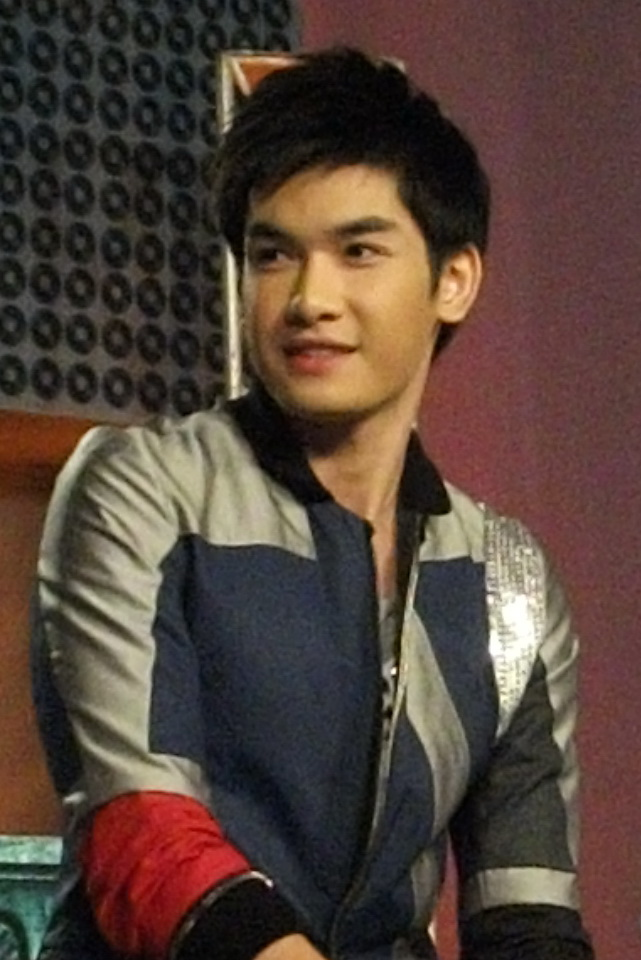

Background information
- Birth name: Wirat Chanpakdee
- Also known as: Singto; Singharat Chanpakdee; Thananat Ruang-ngam; Thanto Ruang-ngam; Thanto Hiranthanapuwadol
- Born: 3 June 1992 (age 33)
- Origin: Khon Kaen, Thailand
- Occupation(s): singer, actor, soldier
- Years active: 2009–present
- Website: Archived 23 February 2012 at the Wayback Machine

Saharat Hiranthanapuwadol (Thai: สหรัฐต์ หิรัญญ์ธนภูวดล; RTGS: Saharat Hiranthanaphuwadon) or formerly name Wirat Chanpakdee (Thai: วิรัช จันทร์ภักดี), Singharat Chanpakdee (Thai: สิงหรัตน์ จันทร์ภักดี), Thananat Ruang-ngam (Thai: ธนณัฏฐ์ รวงงาม), Thanto Ruang-ngam (Thai: ทันโตวิ์ รวงงาม) and Thanto Hiranthanapuwadol (Thai: ทันโตวิ์ หิรัญญ์ธนภูวดล). His nickname Singto means lion. Saharat is a singer in Thailand, best known for The Star 5

He won The Star 5 Thailand, the youngest The Star winner in the show's history.

== Profile ==
In the past, His name was "Wirat Chanpakdee" He was born on 3 June 1992 in Khonkaen, Thailand. He graduated in faculty of engineer from Thammasat University, He is now commander of an Air-forcer (soldier).

== Filmography ==
=== Television dramas ===
- 2010 Traa Barb See Kaw (2010) (ตราบาปสีขาว) (Exact-Scenario/Ch.5) as Songkran (สงกรานต์) with Ploy Tanida Tanawuth
- 2012 Buang Ruk 2012 (บ่วงรัก) (Exact-Scenario/Ch.5) as young Tanin (Cameo) (ธานินทร์ (ตอนหนุ่ม) (รับเชิญ)) with Cee Hataipat Smathvithayavech
- 2013 Pan Ruk Pan Rai 2013 (แผนรัก แผนร้าย) (Exact-Scenario/Ch.5) as Chinsanu (ชิษณุพงศ์) with Cee Hataipat Smathvithayavech
- 2013 Hua Jai Rua Puang (หัวใจเรือพ่วง) (Exact-Scenario/Ch.5) as Harit (ธาริศ) with Gypsy Keerati Mahapruekpong
- 2014 Likay Likay (ลิเก๊..ลิเก) (Exact-Scenario/Ch.5) as Fahprathan (ฟ้าประทาน) with Charm Irvin Osathanond
- 2015 Poo Ying Kon Nun Chue Boonrawd (ผู้หญิงคนนั้นชื่อบุญรอด) (Exact-Scenario/One 31) as Jin (จินต์) with Charebelle Lanlalin Tejasa Weckx
- 2019 Sanya Kaen Saen Rak (สัญญาแค้นแสนรัก) (The One Enterprise/One 31) as Sonthaya (สนธยา) with Ploy Patchara Sridara
- 2022 (ปาฏิหาริย์รัก) (/PPTVHD36) as ()

=== Television series ===
- 20 () (The One Enterprise/One 31) as ()

=== Television sitcom ===
- 2011 Pen Tor (เป็นต่อ) (The One Enterprise/One 31) as Seu (เสือ)
- 2011 (ระเบิดเถิดเทิง ลั่นทุ่ง) (Workpoint Entertainment/Ch.5) as Keng (เก่ง)
- 2012 (ครอบครัวขำ) (Scenario/Ch.3) as soldier (ทหาร)
- 2020 Pen Tor (เป็นต่อ ตอน ) (The One Enterprise/One 31) as Seu (Cameo) (เสือ (รับเชิญ))

== Award ==
- The winner of The Star 5

== Music ==
- Pleng née (In the meaning of "This song" )
- Hua Koi (Head & tail)
- Sa-dut Rak
- Khae Dai Rak

== Other Singto's Site & Data ==
- Pleng nee on imeem
- Lion King Club (Thailand)
- The Official site of THESTAR CONTEST
- Singto-thestar5.com (Thailand)
