= The Voice Thailand season 1 =

The Voice Thailand
- Season 1
- Hosted by: Kob Songsit
- Judges: Saharat Sangkapreecha; Jennifer Kim; Joey Boy; Apiwat Eurthavornsuk
- Winner: Tanont Chamroen
- Runner-up: Thachaya Prathumwan

Release
- Original network: Channel 3
- Original release: 9 September – 15 December 2012

Season chronology
- Next → Season 2

The first series of The Voice เสียงจริงตัวจริง (also known as The Voice Thailand) on 9 September 2012. The show was hosted by Kob Songsit on Channel 3.

== Teams ==
Colour key
Winner
Runners-up
Third/Fourth place
Eliminated in semi-final
Eliminated in quarter-final
Eliminated in first live round
Eliminated in the Battles

Coach	Top 56				
Kong Saharat					
Kong Saharat	Tanont Chamroen	Sarocha Senarat	Nawatchaphat Chaiyatha	Natthawadi Dokkathin	Ekkaphon Rattanakamphon & Kiratikan Phongthongsamran
Kong Saharat	Phitchaya Chanwilai	Pranita Thongkhamwan	Chaowarit Atsadecha	Mokun Pi-kaeo	Chatuphot Sinlapachon
Kong Saharat	Pinpinat Setarun	Rawiorn Swasdisuk & Natthita Wongprom	Phailinthon Phansuk	Kamonthip Thammaphakdi	
Jennifer Kim					
Jennifer Kim	Trakan Sisaengchan	Wichaya Wongsuriyan	Tunraya Chanthawong	Wirasak Kluea-kin	Orave Pinijsarapirom
Jennifer Kim	Kumarika Supphakon	Nonthawit Siriphonphaibun	Chawanwit Thakunwiranan	Pharit Watthanasuk & Kitti Imthanawanit	Ritsara Phusakham
Jennifer Kim	Patthamaphon Thatthonglueang	Nattawat Kitsombun			
Joey Boy					
Joey Boy	Thachaya Prathumwan	Bongkot Charoentham	Phiranan Chanaphantharak	Chitsuda Heng-ratsami	Sapha Phanit-attra
Joey Boy	Chirawut Chanchaisaeng	Aru Yokochi	Pachaphon Wiriyathanasakun	Purisima Dila	Atthaphon Chaisiri
Joey Boy	Suphatsara Paenmai	Sorawit Nimto	Sumet Ong-at	Natthaphong Sincharoen	Nidawan Atsawathawichok
Stamp Apiwat					
Stamp Apiwat	Phichet Bua-kham	Natthawut Chenmana	Duangphon Phongphasuk	Chonthicha Yotsaphon	Narin Prasopphakdi
Stamp Apiwat	Praklaidao Sukkhawat	Ratiphan Phanphinit	Khitaya Sutra	Phichaiyut Chanklap	Sutthichat Saen-at
Stamp Apiwat	Nanthaphop Phinthong	Umari Nakhonkhwang	Om Khongthamronglak	Natthawadi Sinsuesatkun	Chawan Prichasasat

== Blind Auditions ==
Key
– Coach hit his/her "I WANT YOU" button
– Artist eliminated with no coach pressing his or her "I WANT YOU" button
– Artist defaulted to this coach's team
– Artist elected to join this coach's team

=== Episode 1 ===
The first blind audition episode was broadcast on 9 September 2012.

Group performance: The Voice Thailand Coaches – "Made In Thailand"

Order	Artist	Song	Coach's and artist's choices			
Order	Artist	Song	Kong	Kim	Joey	Stamp
1	Bank, Nontavit Siripornpibol _{20, from Bangkok}	"ชีวิตลิขิตเอง" _{originally by Thongchai McIntyre}			—	—
2	Flim, Bongkoj Charoentham _{27, from Chanthaburi}	"ลืมไปก่อน" _{originally by Buddha Bless}	—	—		—
3	Keng, Thachaya Prathumwan _{23, from Songkhla}	"What's My Name? ft. Drake" _{originally by Rihanna}				
4	May, Fonpha Sathisarat _{31, from Bangkok}	"La Vie en rose"_{originally by Édith Piaf}	—	—	—	—
5	Nont, Tanont Chamroen _{16, from Phuket}	"ฟ้า"_{originally by Tattoo Colour}		—	—	—
6	Lee-Yun, Supitsara Panmai _{21, from Bangkok}	"คิดมาก" _{originally by Palmy}	—	—		—
7	Ake & Jo (Aekkapol Rattanakumpol & Kiratikarn Phongthongsumran) _{28 and 34, from Bangkok}	"นิยามรัก" _{originally by Nuvo}		—	—	—
8	Chat, Harit Chaiwanich _{24, from Bangkok}	"นางฟ้า" _{originally by ETC}	—	—	—	—
9	King, Pichet Buakhum _{34, from Chumphon}	"I Don't Want to Miss a Thing" _{originally by Aerosmith}				

=== Episode 2 ===
The second blind audition episode was broadcast on 16 September 2012.

Order	Artist	Song	Coach's and artist's choices			
Order	Artist	Song	Kong	Kim	Joey	Stamp
1	Pui, Jitsuda Pongrutsamee _{42, from Bangkok}	"Valerie" _{originally by Amy Winehouse}				
2	Nan, Lalita Jeungwattanakij _{23, from Bangkok}	"วันเดือนปี" _{originally by เจี๊ยบ วรรธนา}	—	—	—	—
3	Oat, Jirawut Janchaisang _{37, from Bangkok}	"กัญชา" _{originally by Carabao}	—			—
4	Pui, Duangporn Pongphasuk _{29, from Bangkok}	"ลาวดวงเดือน" _{originally by Benbadhanabongse}	—	—	—	
5	Ribbon, Nichapa Nisabordee _{18, from Bangkok}	"ล้มบ้างก็ได้" _{originally by Boyd Kosiyabong}	—	—	—	—
6	Kaew, Pinpinut Setarun _{28, from Uthai Thani}	"นิดนึง" _{originally by พิจิกา จิตตะปุตตะ}		—		—
7	Kom, Orave Pinijsarapirom _{19, from Bangkok}	"Nobody" _{originally by Wonder Girls}				
8	Natt, Natthapong Sinjaroen _{33, from Chiang Mai}	"When a Man Loves a Woman" _{originally by Percy Sledge}	—	—		
9	Ta, Trakarn Srisangchan _{16, from Maha Sarakham}	"หยาดเหงื่อเพื่อแม่" _{originally by เอกพล มนต์ตระการ}				

=== Episode 3 ===
The third blind audition episode was broadcast on 23 September 2012.

Order	Artist	Song	Coach's and artist's choices			
Order	Artist	Song	Kong	Kim	Joey	Stamp
1	Tack, Wichaya Wongsuriyan _{21, from Bangkok}	"One and Only" _{originally by Adele}				
2	Neng, Phichaiyuth Chantraklub _{42, from Saraburi}	"คิดถึง" _{originally by หรั่ง}	—	—	—	
3	Aom, Nanthawan Seetabuj _{24, from Chiangmai}	"รักไม่ได้" _{originally by Groove Riders}	—	—	—	—
4	Tee, Autthapol Chaisiri _{31, from Songkhla}	"I'm Yours" _{originally by Jason Mraz}				
5	Gail, Purisima Dila _{47, from Bangkok}	"Your Song" _{originally by Elton John}	—	—		—
6	New, Pachapon Wiriyathanasakol _{22, from Bangkok}	"คิดถึงเธอทุกที่ที่อยู่คนเดียว" _{originally by Jennifer Kim}	—	—		
7	Aru Yokoishi _{20, from Bangkok}	"I Will Always Love You" _{originally by Whitney Houston}	—	—		—
8	King, Pongpan Polsangoun _{30, from Phuket}	"ความคิด" _{originally by Stamp}	—	—	—	—
9	Suay, Sarocha Senarattana _{24, from Nakhon Si Thammarat}	"Fallin'" _{originally by Alicia Keys}		—	—	—
10	Nid, Nidawarn Autsawataweechok _{19, from Bangkok}	"The Moon Represents My Heart" _{originally by Teresa Teng}		—		
11	Max, Nuttawuth Jenmana _{22, from Bangkok}	"Home" _{originally by Michael Bublé}	—	—	—	

=== Episode 4 ===
The fourth blind audition episode was broadcast on 30 September 2012.

Order	Artist	Song	Coach's and artist's choices			
Order	Artist	Song	Kong	Kim	Joey	Stamp
1	June, Kumarika Supakarn _{26, from Bangkok}	"Irreplaceable" _{originally by Beyoncé}	—		—	—
2	Nat, Nattawadee Dokkathin _{16, from Phuket}	"ชีวิตบัดซบ" _{originally by ฉันทนา กิติยพันธ์}		—		
3	Guitar, Piranun Chonpantharak _{30, from Nakhon Ratchasima}	"L.O.V.E." _{originally by Nat King Cole}	—	—		—
4	Gope, Weerasak Kluakan _{32, from Bangkok}	"Just the Way You Are" _{originally by Bruno Mars}				
5	Oum-boon, Thanyaporn Chompoo _{21, from Chiang Mai}	"ว้าเหว่" _{originally by Jennifer Kim}	—	—	—	—
6	Pom, Narinth Prasoppakdee _{34, from Bangkok}	"Go the Distance" _{originally by Michael Bolton}	—	—	—	
7	Annie, Nawatchpat Chaiya _{24, from Roi Et}	"ซมซาน" _{originally by Loso}		—	—	—
8	Mo, Mokhon Pikaew _{35, from Bangkok}	"ทําไมต้องเธอ" _{originally by Thongchai McIntyre}		—	—	—
9	Tu, Chaowarit Autsadecha _{29, from Kalasin}	"หลอกกันเล่นเลย'" _{originally by Nuvo}		—	—	—
10	Xumet Ong-Art _{43, from Bangkok}	"เพียงครึ่งใจ" _{originally by The Innocent}				
11	Odd, Nuntapob Pinthong _{42, from Hong Kong}	"Let It Be" _{originally by The Beatles}	—	—	—	
12	Om, Om Kongthumrongluk _{32, from Singapore}	"เรื่องจริง" _{originally by Boyd Kosiyabong}	—	—	—	
13	Jungo & Kaeng (Preuk Pattarasuk & Kitti Aimthanawanich) _{31 and 32, from Bangkok}	"Doraemon no uta" _{originally by Kumiko Ōsugi} "Genghis khan" _{originally by Royal Sprite}				

=== Episode 5 ===
The fifth blind audition episode was broadcast on 7 October 2012.

Order	Artist	Song	Coach's and artist's choices			
Order	Artist	Song	Kong	Kim	Joey	Stamp
1	Kat, Sasitorn Srisomphong _{21, from Bangkok}	"Born This Way" _{originally by Lady Gaga}	—	—	—	—
2	Nu-Lek, Aumaree Nakhornkwang _{22, from Loei}	"ที่ว่าง" _{originally by Pause}	—	—		
3	Jenny, Ratipan Panpinich _{22, from Bangkok}	"ใคร" _{originally by Boyd Kosiyabong}	—	—		
4	Aek, Sorawit Nimtor _{29, from Suphanburi}	"หนุ่มสุพรรณ" _{originally by Carabao}				
5	Ploy, Cholticha Yotsapol _{27, from Bangkok}	"I Don't Want to Miss a Thing" _{originally by Aerosmith}	—	—	—	
6	Ae, Praneeta Kongkumwan _{41, from Pathumthani}	"ลึกสุดใจ" _{originally by Joe-Kong}		—	—	—
7	Out, Chawanwit Thakulwiranun _{29, from Bangkok}	"ที่ฉันรู้" _{originally by Boyd Kosiyabong}	—			—
8	Eed, Chantakarn Sittiwibol _{47, from Bangkok}	"In My Life" _{originally by The Beatles}	—	—	—	—
9	Pingpong, Jatapoj Sinlapaphichon _{32, from Bangkok}	"My Sacrifice" _{originally by Creed}		—	—	—
10	Tangmo, Pichaya Chanwilai _{19, from Lamphun}	"คิดถึงนะ" _{originally by แพรว คณิตกุล}		—	—	—
11	Tul, Tulraya Chantawong _{29, from Loei}	"Mercy" _{originally by Duffy}				
12	Jaja & AomAmp, (Rawioarn Sawasdisok & Nattathita Wongpormha) _{22 and 23, from Unknown}	"รักหนักแน่น" _{originally by Thongchai McIntyre}		—	—	—

=== Episode 6 ===
The sixth blind audition episode was broadcast on 14 October 2012.

Order	Artist	Song	Coach's and artist's choices			
Order	Artist	Song	Kong	Kim	Joey	Stamp
1	Tai, Phailintorn Panthasuk _{37, from Chiang Mai}	"ใจเอย" _{originally by Marsha Wattanapanich}		—	—	—
2	Gaew, Praklaydao Sukawat _{26, from Nakhon Pathom}	"Saving All My Love For You" _{originally by Whitney Houston}	—	—		
3	Milk, Risara Phusakum _{19, from Lampang}	"สิ่งสำคัญ" _{originally by เอ็นโดรฟิน}	—		—	—
4	Yee, Sujinda Noppapatchararak _{34, from Chiang Mai}	"ขอจันทร์" _{originally by วิยะดา โกมารกุล ณ นคร}	—	—	—	—
5	Rose, Pinmala Rittiruth _{35, from Bangkok}	"Set Fire on the Rain" _{originally by Adele}	—	—	—	—
6	Ken, Pathiphat Supabburuth _{Information unknown}	"เสียงกระซิบ" _{originally by Thongchai McIntyre}	—	—	—	—
7	Pook, Pasirat Krajangthid _{Information unknown}	"I Won't Give Up" _{originally by Jason Mraz}	—	—	—	—
8	Title, Suthichad San-ard _{26, from Bangkok}	"Each Day Gets Better" _{originally by John Legend}	—		—	
9	Front, Patamaporn Thadthongleung _{20, from Chiang Rai}	"ลูกอม" _{originally by วัชราวลี}	—		—	—
10	Bonbon, Sapha Phanij-attra _{29, from Chanthaburi}	"Come Back to Me" _{originally by Se7en}	—			—
11	Moo, Nattawat Kijsomboon _{41, from Bangkok}	"เหนื่อยไหม" _{originally by Thongchai McIntyre}	—		—	—
12	Key, Keytaya Sutara _{27, from Songkhla}	"หากรู้สักนิด" _{originally by สวลี ผกาพันธุ์}	—	—		
13	Toom, Chawarn Prechasasat _{57, from Unknown}	"ความคิด" _{originally by Stamp}	—	—	—	
14	Narm, Nattawadee Sinsuesatkul _{23, from Unknown}	"Come Together" _{originally by The Beatles}	—	—	—	
15	Peung, Kamonthip Tumpakdee _{29, from Unknown}	"สนามอารมณ์" _{originally by สวลี ผกาพันธุ์}		—	—	—

== Battle Rounds ==
After the Blind Auditions, each coach had 12-15 contestants for the Battle Rounds. Coaches began narrowing down the playing field by training the contestants with the help of "trusted advisors". Team Kong is advised by Saovanit Navapant, Team Kim by Neung ETC., Team Joey by Thana Laovasut and Team Stamp by Pod Moderndog.

Each episode featured battles consisting of pairings from within each team, and each battle concluded with the respective coach eliminating one of the two contestants or two of the three contestants in some battles for only one winner in that battle; the six winners for each coach advanced to the live shows.

Key
– Battle winner
– Eliminated artist

=== Episode 7 ===
The first part of the Battle Round was broadcast on 21 October 2012.

Order	Coach	Artist			Song
1.1	Jennifer Kim	Tack Wichaya	Bank Nontavit		"Forget You" _{originally by Cee Lo Green}
1.2	Stamp Apiwat	Key Keytaya	Toom Chawarn	Pui Duangporn	"เสน่หา" _{originally by สุเทพ วงศ์กำแหง}
1.3	Kong Saharat	Nont Tanont	Mokhon	Tu Chaowarit	"รักคุณยิ่งกว่าใคร" _{originally by ก๊อต จักรพรรณ์}
1.4	Kong Saharat	Pingpong Jatapoj	Suay Sarocha		"I Hate Myself For Loving You" _{originally by Joan Jett}
1.5	Joey Boy	Nid Nidawarn	Aru Yokoishi	Film Bongkoj	"หัวใจสลาย" _{originally by The Hot Pepper Singers}
1.6	Jennifer Kim	Out Chawanwit	Gope Weerasak		"ส่องกระจก" _{originally by ไพบูลย์เกียรติ เขียวแก้ว}
1.7	Stamp Apiwat	King Pichet	Neng Phichaiyuth		"ฤดูที่ฉันเหงา" _{originally by Flure}
2.1	Joey Boy	Lee-Yun Supitsara	Pui Jitsuda		"เกลียดคนสวย" _{originally by ฉันทนา กิติยพันธ์}
2.2	Kong Saharat	Tai Phailintorn	Pueng Kamonthip	Nat Nattawadee	"กลกามแห่งความรัก" _{originally by ฉันทนา กิติยพันธ์}
2.3	Jennifer Kim	Tul Tulraya	Front Patamaporn		"นาฬิกาตาย" _{originally by Bodyslam}
2.4	Stamp Apiwat	Odd Nuntapob	Om Kongthumrongluk	Pom Narinth	"You Are The Sunshine Of My Life" _{originally by Stevie Wonder}
2.5	Joey Boy	Tee Autthapol	Bonbon Sapha	New Pachapon	"ดาวล้อมเดือน" _{originally by สุนทราภรณ์}
2.6	Kong Saharat	Ae Praneeta	Annie Nawatchpat		"หนุ่มบาวสาวปาน" _{originally by แอ๊ด คาราบาว & ปาน ธนพร}
2.7	Stamp Apiwat	Title Suthichad	Max Nuttawuth		"Billie Jean" _{originally by Michael Jackson}
2.8	Jennifer Kim	Jungo & Kaeng	June Kumarika		"Single Ladies (Put a Ring On It)" _{originally by Beyoncé}
2.9	Joey Boy	Gail Dila	Guitar Piranun	Xumet	"Dance Little Lady Dance" _{originally by Tina Charles}
3.1	Kong Saharat	Kaew Pinpinut	Tangmo Pichaya		"ในวันที่เราต้องไกลห่าง" _{originally by Lula}
3.2	Stamp Apiwat	Gaew Praklaydao	Nu-Lek Aumaree	Narm Nattawadee	"หนึ่งเดียวคนนี้" _{originally by อัญชลี จงคดีกิจ}
3.3	Jennifer Kim	Moo Nattawat	Kom Orave		"คนถูกทิ้ง" _{originally by Muzu}
3.4	Kong Saharat	Aek & Jo	Jaja & AomAmp		"แอบชอบ" _{originally by ละอองฟอง}
3.5	Joey Boy	Aek Sorawit	Oat Jirawut		"คนหนังเหนียว" _{originally by Carabao}
3.6	Stamp Apiwat	Jenny Ratipan	Ploy Cholticha		"Tick Tock" _{originally by Palmy}
3.7	Jennifer Kim	Ta Trakarn	Milk Risara		"พี่ไปดูหนูไปด้วย" _{originally by Pumpuang Duangjan}
3.8	Joey Boy	Keng Thachaya	Nat Natthapong		"I Feel Good" _{originally by James Brown}

== Live Performance Rounds ==
Key
– Artist automatically advanced by public vote
– Artist in the bottom saved by coach's choice
– Eliminated in first live round
– Eliminated in quarter-final
– Eliminated in semi-final

=== Episode 10: First Round, Week 1 ===
The first live round, week 1, aired on 11 November 2012. Team Kong and Team Kim performed in this episode.

Order	Coach	Artist	Song	Result
1	Jennifer Kim	Kom Orave	"Bleeding Love"	Eliminated (Team Kim)
2	Kong Saharat	Suay Sarocha	"อยากสวย"	Kong's Choice
3	Jennifer Kim	Gope Weerasak	"Superman (It's Not Easy)"	Kim's Choice
4	Jennifer Kim	June Kumarika	"รักไม่ต้องการเวลา"	Eliminated (Team Kim)
5	Kong Saharat	Nont Tanont	"กระเป๋าแบนแฟนทิ้ง"	Public Vote
6	Kong Saharat	Nat Nattawadee	"Someone Like You"	Kong's Choice
7	Kong Saharat	Aek & Jo	"เอาอะไรมาแลกก็ไม่ยอม"	Eliminated (Team Kong)
8	Jennifer Kim	Tack Wichaya	"เสียใจแต่ไม่แคร์"	Kim's Choice
9	Kong Saharat	Tangmo Pichaya	"พูดไม่คิด"	Eliminated (Team Kong)
10	Kong Saharat	Annie Nawatchpat	"ฟั่นเฟือน"	Public Vote
11	Jennifer Kim	Ta Trakarn	"กลับมาทําไม"	Public Vote
12	Jennifer Kim	Tul Tulraya	"Upside Down"	Public Vote

=== Episode 11: First Round, Week 2 ===
The first live round, week 2, aired on 18 November 2012. Team Joey and Team Stamp performed in this episode.

Order	Coach	Artist	Song	Result
1	Joey Boy	Bonbon Sapha	"ฝน"	Eliminated (Team Joey)
2	Stamp Apiwat	Ploy Cholticha	"อ๊อด อ๊อด"	Stamp's Choice
3	Joey Boy	Film Bongkoj	"กรุณาฟังให้จบ"	Joey's Choice
4	Stamp Apiwat	Pom Narinth	"เสียดาย"	Eliminated (Team Stamp)
5	Joey Boy	Pui Jitsuda	"แด่คนเคยรัก"	Joey's Choice
6	Stamp Apiwat	Pui Duangporn	"Love on Top"	Stamp's Choice
7	Joey Boy	Guitar Piranun	"สาวอีสานรอรัก"	Public Vote
8	Stamp Apiwat	King Pichet	"อีกหน่อยเธอคงเข้าใจ"	Public Vote
9	Stamp Apiwat	Gaew Praklaydao	"ตลอดเวลา"	Eliminated (Team Stamp)
10	Joey Boy	Keng Thachaya	"ชู้"	Public Vote
11	Joey Boy	Oat Jirawut	"Canned Heat"	Eliminated (Team Joey)
12	Stamp Apiwat	Max Nuttawuth	"Nothin' On You"	Public Vote

=== Episode 12: Quarter-Final, Week 1 ===
The live quarter-final round, week 1, aired on 25 November 2012. Team Kong and Team Kim performed in this episode.

Order	Coach	Artist	Song	Result
1	Jennifer Kim	Gope Weerasak	"ฤดูที่แตกต่าง"	Eliminated (Team Kim)
2	Kong Saharat	Annie Nawatchpat	"โปรดส่งใครมารักฉันที"	Eliminated (Team Kong)
3	Jennifer Kim	Tul Tulraya	"I Love the Nightlife"	Eliminated (Team Kim)
4	Kong Saharat	Nont Tanont	"ขอบใจจริงๆ"	Public Vote
5	Jennifer Kim	Tack Wichaya	"เงียบเงียบคนเดียว"	Kim's Choice
6	Kong Saharat	Nat Nattawadee	"ควักหัวใจ"	Eliminated (Team Kong)
7	Kong Saharat	Suay Sarocha	"รักเธอจริงๆ"	Kong's Choice
8	Jennifer Kim	Ta Trakarn	"สาวจันทร์กั้งโกบ"	Public Vote

=== Episode 13: Quarter-Final, Week 2 ===
The live quarter-final round, week 2, aired on 2 December 2012. Team Joey and Team Stamp performed in this episode.

Order	Coach	Artist	Song	Result
1	Joey Boy	Pui Jitsuda	"I Will Survive"	Eliminated (Team Joey)
2	Stamp Apiwat	Pui Duangporn	"ความในใจ/ฉันจะฝันถึงเธอ"	Eliminated (Team Stamp)
3	Joey Boy	Guitar Piranun	"Shanghai Bund"	Eliminated (Team Joey)
4	Stamp Apiwat	Max Nuttawuth	"เพียงชายคนนี้ (ไม่ใช่ผู้วิเศษ)/You're Beautiful"	Public Vote
5	Stamp Apiwat	Ploy Cholticha	"Before I Fall in Love"	Eliminated (Team Stamp)
6	Joey Boy	Keng Thachaya	"บุษบา"	Public Vote
7	Joey Boy	Film Bongkoj	"พี่ชายที่แสนดี"	Joey's Choice
8	Stamp Apiwat	King Pichet	"It's My Life/Crazy in Love"	Stamp's Choice

=== Episode 14: Semi-Final ===
The live Semi-final round aired on 9 December 2012.

Order	Coach	Contestant	Song	Coach points	Public points	Total points	Result
1	Joey Boy	Keng Thachaya	"จงรัก"	60	90	150	Advanced
2	Jennifer Kim	Tack Wichaya	"Skyfall"	60	15	75	Eliminated
3	Joey Boy	Film Bongkoj	"ขอให้ผม"	40	10	50	Eliminated
4	Jennifer Kim	Ta Trakarn	"Baby/อย่าขอหมอลำ"	40	85	125	Advanced
5	Stamp Apiwat	King Pichet	"แสงสุดท้าย"	55	51	106	Advanced
6	Kong Saharat	Suay Sarocha	"Hava Naquila"	48	18	66	Eliminated
7	Stamp Apiwat	Max Nuttawuth	"Come What May"	45	49	94	Eliminated
8	Kong Saharat	Nont Tanont	"คาถามหานิยม"	52	82	134	Advanced

=== Episode 15: Final Round ===
The live Final round aired on 15 December 2012. Non Thanon was named the winner.

Performance Order	Coach	Contestant	Type	Song	Result
1	Jennifer Kim	Ta Trakarn (with Jennifer Kim)	Duet	"เดือนเพ็ญ"	
2	Stamp Apiwat	King Pichet	Original song	"ผู้ชายที่มีความสุขที่สุดในโลก"	3rd/4th Place
3	Kong Saharat	Nont Tanont (with Kong Saharat)	Duet	"เพราะอะไร"	
4	Joey Boy	Keng Thachaya	Original song	"ทศกัณฐ์มานะ"	Runner-up
5	Stamp Apiwat	King Pichet (with Stamp Apiwat)	Duet	"วัดใจ"	
6	Kong Saharat	Nont Tanont	Original song	"ยังไม่เคย"	Winner
7	Joey Boy	Keng Thachaya (with Joey Boy)	Duet	"ยายสำอาง"	
8	Jennifer Kim	Ta Trakarn	Original song	"นักร้องคนเก่า"	3rd/4th Place

== Results ==
Key
– Artist automatically advanced by public vote
– Artist in the bottom saved by coach's choice
– Eliminated in first live round
– Eliminated in quarter-final
– Eliminated in semi-final

Stage:	First Round		Quarter-Final		Semi-Final	Final Round
TEAM KONG
Nont Tanont	Advanced		Advanced		Advanced	Winner (Week 6)
Suay Sarocha	Safe		Safe		Eliminated (Week 5)	
Annie Nawatchpat	Advanced		Eliminated (Week 3)			
Nat Nattawadee	Safe		Eliminated (Week 3)			
Aek & Jo	Eliminated (Week 1)					
Tangmo Pichaya	Eliminated (Week 1)					
TEAM KIM
Ta Trakarn	Advanced		Advanced		Advanced	Third Place/Fourth Place (Week 6)
Tack Wichaya	Safe		Safe		Eliminated (Week 5)	
Tul Tulraya	Advanced		Eliminated (Week 3)			
Gope Weerasak	Safe		Eliminated (Week 3)			
June Kumarika	Eliminated (Week 1)					
Klom Orawee	Eliminated (Week 1)					
TEAM JOEY
Keng Thachaya		Advanced		Advanced	Advanced	Runner-Up (Week 6)
Film Bongkoj		Safe		Safe	Eliminated (Week 5)	
Guitar Piranun		Advanced		Eliminated (Week 4)		
Pui Jitsuda		Safe		Eliminated (Week 4)		
Bonbon Sapha		Eliminated (Week 2)				
Oat Jirawut		Eliminated (Week 2)				
TEAM STAMP
King Pichet		Advanced		Safe	Advanced	Third Place/Fourth Place (Week 6)
Max Nuttawuth		Advanced		Advanced	Eliminated (Week 5)	
Pui Duangporn		Safe		Eliminated (Week 4)		
Ploy Cholticha		Safe		Eliminated (Week 4)		
Pom Narinth		Eliminated ( Week 2)				
Gaew Praklaydao		Eliminated (Week 2)				

== TV Rating ==
#	Episode	Original air date	Rating (Bangkok)	Rating (Nationwide)	Reference
1	The Blind Auditions, Part 1	September 9, 2012	7.2	4.6	
2	The Blind Auditions, Part 2	September 16, 2012	8.9	5.7	
3	The Blind Auditions, Part 3	September 23, 2012	11.0	6.8	
4	The Blind Auditions, Part 4	September 30, 2012	9.7	6.2	
5	The Blind Auditions, Part 5	October 7, 2012	11.0	7.3	
6	The Blind Auditions, Part 6	October 14, 2012	10.3	7.0	
7	The Battle Rounds, Part 1	October 21, 2012	11.8	6.1	
8	The Battle Rounds, Part 2	October 28, 2012	9.6	6.2	
9	The Battle Rounds, Part 3	November 4, 2012	10.8	7.3	
10	First Live Round, Week 1	November 11, 2012	9.5	6.2	
11	First Live Round, Week 2	November 18, 2012	10.1	5.7	
12	Quarter Final Round, Week 1	November 25, 2012	8.5	5.2	
13	Quarter Final Round, Week 2	December 2, 2012	9.5	6.4	
14	Semi-Final Round	December 9, 2012	9.1	6.0	
15	Final Round	December 15, 2012	10.4	6.6	
