= Sukrit Wisetkaew =

Thai singer and actor

- สุกฤษฎิ์ วิเศษแก้ว
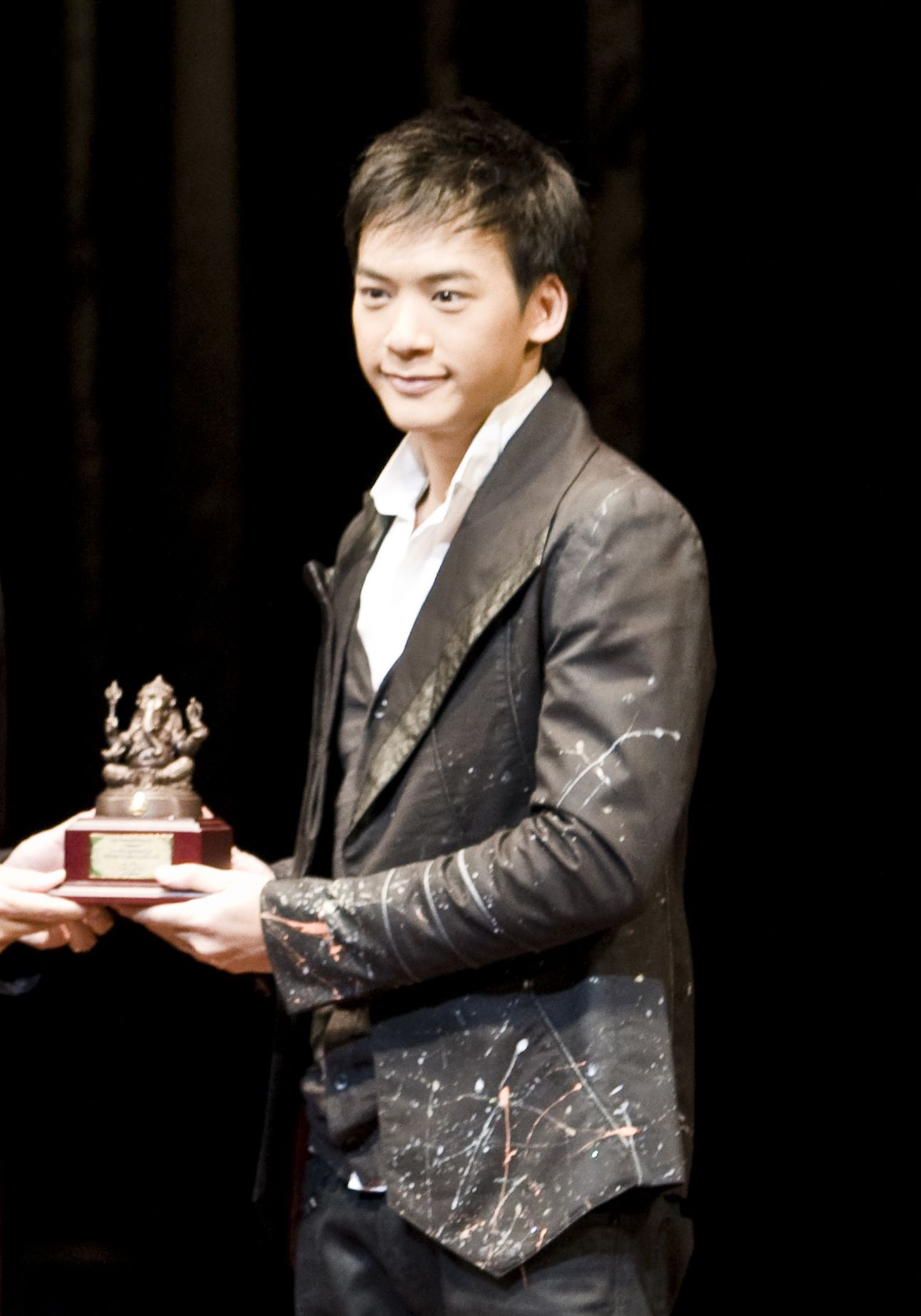
- Wisetkaew in 2009
- Born: Sukrit Wisetkaew; 4 September 1985 (age 41); Chiang Mai, Thailand
- Occupations: Singer; actor
- Years active: 2006–2023
- Height: 1.73 m (5 ft 8 in)
- Website: https://instagram.com/biesukrit_w

Sukrit Wisetkaew (Thai: สุกฤษฎิ์ วิเศษแก้ว, RTGS: Su-krit Wisetkaeo, pronounced [sù.krìt wí.sèːt.kɛ̂ːw], born 4 September 1985), commonly known by his nickname Bie (บี้; RTGS: Bi), is a Thai singer and actor. He was discovered on the third season of Thai television talent contest The Star. After winning the position as the first runner-up in The Star 3, Bie became one of the hottest rising singers and gained immense popularity after his debut single I Need Somebody.

Besides his career as a singer and an actor in TV drama and sitcom, he was also trained to be a stage actor in several musicals. Behind the Painting is one of his musical masterpieces in which he acted as one of the leading roles.

In 2008, after under 2 years in the entertainment business, Bie became one of The Most Influential People in Thailand, according to a poll by the Thai Positioning magazine and Siamrath.

In May 2015, Bie was to make his American stage debut in the world premiere of WATERFALL, an epic new Broadway bound musical love story, based on a contemporary classic Thai novel, Behind the Painting by Sriburapha, featuring book and lyrics by Tony Award-winner Richard Maltby, Jr., music by Oscar- winner and two-time Tony Award nominee, David Shire and directed by Broadway and Thai theatrical impresario Tak Viravan.

== Biography ==
=== Early life ===
Bie was born in 1985 in Chiang Mai, Thailand. His nickname Bie comes from his full nickname "Gumbie", which translates to Dragonfly. He has an elder sister named Mangpor whose name also has the same meaning. Bie attended high school at Montfort College, at Chiang Mai, and he was in the Science/Mathematics program. After that he attended King Mongkut's University of Technology Thonburi at Bangkok, receiving a Bachelor of Engineering (Mechatronics Engineering) degree in 2009. During his college years, he decided to audition for the third season of The Star. During college, he spent time both studying and working hard as an actor and singer in the entertainment business.

=== The Star 2006 ===
In early 2006, Bie auditioned for the third season of The Star. Even though he did not impress all three commentators, he consistently received the highest number of votes each week. He made it through to become one of the two final contestants, but he did not win the competition. Immediately after becoming runner-up in The Star 3 competition, Bie signed a contract with Exact and GMM Grammy.

=== 2006–2007: Bie the star ===
Bie is a singer and actor of Exact, under GMM Grammy. After his victory on The Star, he began training under a management agency GMM Grammy. His first single, "I Need Somebody", was released in Thailand in October 2006. After the song peaked on the radio charts for many weeks, it received the award as the number one love song single of 2006 from Star Entertainment Awards, Seed Awards, and In Young Generation Choice Awards.

Besides his career as a singer Bie also took time to star in his first drama series called "Roy Adeed Hang Ruk". It is now in many languages including the Philippines, Cambodian and Indian. With his naturally humorous character, he also has starred in the ongoing sitcom called "Nut Kub Nut" since early 2007 to present. In May 2007, Bie starred in his second drama series called "Hua Jai Sila" with Fang Pichaya.

Following the success of his debut as a singer and actor, Bie was offered by "Thakonkiat Veerawan" managing director of Exact & Scenario, to star in the Musical theatre "Banlang Mek" as youngest son, Pakorn, starring alongside Sinjai Plengpanich, one of Thailand leading actresses. The musical was extremely successful, with 47 performances, and trained him to become one of Thailand's leading stage stars.

=== 2008 : Most popular star ===
Bie's second album, I Love You Too, was released on 26 March 2008, and his single "Jungwa Huajai" (Rhythm of the Heart) peaked at number one on many charts in Thailand. The second single from this album called "Someone" also peaked at number one at EFM and Hotwave charts. Furthermore, this album ranked as one of the best-selling albums of GMM Grammy of the year.

In May, Bie had his first solo concert, "Love Attack". This concert was held in Thailand's biggest concert hall "Impact Arena". This was very surprising to many because he had only been in the entertainment business for only under 2 years. However ticket sales were through the roof and the concert was sold out in 2 days. A second show was thus added for the viewers. His popularity as a singer also won him Singer of the Year Award at the Top Awards and Popular Artist of the Year at Siam Dara Awards.

In August, due to his stage charisma, that he beam and glow on the stage, Bie returned to the stage in an even bigger musical, Behind the Painting (Khang Lang Pharp), with 49 performances. This was his first lead role in a musical, even though he had only recently begun his singing and acting career, especially for musical theatre. In this show, his role was a young Thai student studying abroad in Japan who falls in love with a dynasty woman older than he is, played by Pat Suthasinee who is known as the musical princess of Thailand.

This year his career won him Popular Star of the Year at Nine Entertain Awards. He also won the Influential People of The Year award in Thailand's social circle, by Position and Siamrath.

=== 2009 - 2023 ===
His single "Maak Maai" (มากมาย: Plenty) from the third album, "Hug Bie" (ฮักบี้: 'Hug' in Northern Thai means love), has more than 5 million digital downloads . This album peaked at number one top digital downloads of GMM Grammy in 2009 and sold more than 1 million copies to date.

Bie came back to star in a drama series called "Prajan See Roong" (พระจันทร์สีรุ้ง: The Rainbow-colored Moon) with a famous actress Aff Taksaorn. This drama series was not a production of Exact, it was his first time working with "Lakorn Thai" at Channel 3. Bie was not cast for this role but it was given to him by "Da Hathairat", the owner and producer of Lakorn Thai production. Prajan See Roong also awarded Mental Health Media Award 2009, TV Drama of the Year from Nine Entertain Awards 2010 and The Best Drama Award from Siam Dara Stars Awards 2010.

In July, Bie performed a second solo concert called "Love Maak Maai" at Impact Arena hall, tickets were sold out in a day, and so a second show was added to the schedule. This year Bie was also continually awarded Popular Vote Artist Award from Sudsapda awards 2009 and Hot Singer of The Year from TV Inside Hot Awards.

In May 2010, Bie came back with his 4th series which was a comedy, "Dok Ruk Rim Tang" (ดอกรักริมทาง: The sidewalk love flower). The drama had the highest viewer ratings of Exact series in this year. On July 4, Bie had ordinated into a monk for 10 days. This year he was also awarded Most Popular Star of the Year for 2 Consecutive Years at Nine Entertain Awards and Star Popular Vote from Siamdara Star Awards 2010.

In October 2010 Bie represented Thailand and performed at the 7th Asia Song Festival, organised by Korea Foundation for International Culture Exchange, at the Seoul Olympic Stadium.

On 2 March, a quiz show called Fan Pan Tae aired an episode on Bie. The quiz show was extremely popular, and tested the contestants' wits and knowledge about Bie. While the questions were said to be "ridiculously hard", a woman named Apichaya Chuankao (อภิชญา จวนเก่า) could answer every question on Bie, with an example being "From this picture (which was completely black and white, and showed only Bie's posture), which song is he dancing to?" The final catch of the program was when Bie actually appeared and awarded Apichaya personally- to the surprise of everyone including the audience.

Bie released his first single "Glua Tee Nai" (กลัวที่ไหน: I'm not afraid) and soon released A single called "Rak Na Ka" (รักนะคะ: Love you) from his new album ' Rak Na Ka ' which was released on the 10 March 2011 and the VCD on the 31 March 2011.

== Social Responsibility Activities ==
Bie has continually participated in socially beneficial activities of Thai society. He also received the honorary awards from many agencies including Outstanding Youth Award 2009 from Ministry of Education, Award for "Filial Children Towards their Mothers" from Ministry of Social Development and Human Security and Diamond Song Award Best Rendition in Thai.

Bie was a Presenter for "Moral Support" campaign, the project worked on areas of which Princess Bajrakitiyabha has expressed concern. In 2008 Office of the Narcotics Control Board had appointed Grammy artist Bie the star presenter, by outstanding pertinacity, in the annual campaign against drugs. Bie was also the Ambassador for "Stop violence towards children, women and family violence" campaign of Ministry of Social Development and Security. Besides, he also participated in "Just Say No" project, a campaign against drugs in 2008.

In 2009, Ministry of Public Health has appointed him a Presenter for "Health Support" campaign. He was also a representative of the KMUTT's graduates, in Outstanding Activities, to present a wrist garland to Her Royal Highness Princess Maha Chakri Sirindhorn, who presided over the Graduation Ceremony 2009. The end of year, Bie had in the special concerts by various artists, in a special event "The Greatest of the Kings, the Greetings of the Land", the 82nd birthday of His Majesty the King, led by the government offices, the theme song King of Kings has been specially composed for this event.

In 2010 Bie started with "The Big Green Miracle" Project of Sudsapda's which he was chosen. The project is about doing good for the community, nature and the environment.

== Discography ==
=== Studio albums ===
#	Album	Track list
1st	Love Scene: Released: 16 October 2006; Length: 38:99; Label: GMM Grammy	Track list: 1. อยากขอสักคน... (I need somebody); 2. ตัดใจไม่ไหว (Can’t Give You Up); 3. คุณผู้หญิงผมยาว (Khoon Poo Ying Pom Yao); 4. ถ้าคืนนี้คุณนอนไม่หลับ (Tha Kuen Nee Koon Non Mai Lab); 5. อดห่วงไม่ไหว (Od Huang Mai Wai); 6. รหัสรัก (Code loves); 7. สายไปไหม (Is it too late); 8. หยุดฉันที (Stop me); 9. น้องพิเศษ (Nong Pi Set; 10. เพียงสบตา (Piang Sob Ta)
2nd	I Love You Too: Released: 2 January 2008; Length: 38:20; Label: GMM Grammy	Track list: 1. จังหวะหัวใจ (Heart Rhythm); 2. ซัมวัน (Someone); 3. ปากหนัก Feat. Vietrio (Hardly say); 4. อยากถูกเรียกว่าแฟน (Yak Took Riank Wa Fan); 5. มิส คอล มิส ยู (Missed call miss you); 6. คำจำกัดความ (Kam Jam Kad Kwam); 7. ขอหึง...นิดนึงนะ (Ko Hueng...Nid Nueng Na); 8. Love At First Sight; 9. เพื่อนร่วมทาง (Puean Ruam Thang); 10. I Love You Too
3rd	Hug Bie: Released: 9 April 2009; Length: 39:00; Label: GMM Grammy	Track list: 1. ฮัก (HUG); 2. มากมาย (Mak Mai); 3. 7 วันที่ฉันเหงา (Seven lonely days); 4. เวท อะ มินิท (Wait a minute); 5. ความทรงจำในลมหายใจ (The Memory in the breath); 6. หายใจบอกรักเธอ (Hai Jai Bok Rak Ter); 7. รักบี้ (Love Bie); 8. ขอโทษ (I'm sorry); 9. ก่อนเพลงสุดท้าย (Before the last song); 10. คนที่เธอรัก Feat. Vietrio
4th	Rak na kha: Released: 10 March 2011; Length: N/A; Label: GMM Grammy	Track list: 1. กลัวที่ไหน (Glua Tee Nai); 2. รักนะคะ (Ruk na kah); 3. Look Like Love; 4. ยังจำกันได้ไหม (Young Jum Gun Dai Mai); 5. ละครรัก (Love Drama); 6. พ่อแง่แม่งอน (I respect Her pique); 7. Thinking of You; 8. ดูดูกันไป (Doo doo kan pai); 9. Free Man (แฟนไม่มี); 10. เผลอรักหมดใจ (Plur Ruk Mot Jai); 11. ให้ฉันได้รู้ที (Hai Chan Dai Roo Tee); 12. เสียงของบ้าน (The sound of the house)

=== EPs ===
#	Album	Track list
1st	It's Alright: Released: 23 February 2010; Length: N/A; Label: GMM Grammy	Track list: 1. It's Alright; 2. เพลงรัก (Love Song); 3. In Love; 4. It's Alright -Special Version-; 5. เพลงรัก (Love Song) -Special Version-; 6. In Love -Special Version-; 7. It's Alright -Remix-; 8. In Love -Piano-
2nd	Na But Now: Released: 11 May 2012; Length: N/A; Label: GMM Grammy	Track list: 1. ณ บัดNow (Na But Now); 2. คนเดิมของเธอ; 3. คำถามของความไว้ใจ; 4. ณ บัดNow -เมษา มิกซ์- (Na But Now -Mesa Mix-)

=== Compilation albums ===
Year	Title
2008	BIE LOVE HITS: Released: 25 August 2008; Label: GMM Grammy; Formats: CD; Track list: 1. อยากขอสักคน... (I need somebody); 2. อยากถูกเรียกว่าแฟน (Yak Took Riak Wa Fan); 3. โทรมา...ว่ารัก (Tor Ma...Wa Rak); 4. แค่ขอมีเธอ (Kae Ko Mee Ter); 5. จังหวะหัวใจ (Heart rhythm); 6. ตัดใจไม่ไหว (Tad Jai Mai Wai); 7. ซัมวัน (Someone); 8. เคยรัก (Ever love); 9. ปากหนัก (Pak Nak); 10. มิส คอล มิส ยู (Missed call miss you); 11. คนสำคัญ (Kon Sam Kan); 12. หัวใจของเธอ (Her heart); 13. Everything (I-Mobile Hitz 101 & 201); 14. จูนคลื่นหัวใจ (Joon Kluen Hua Jai) (I-Mobile Hitz 101 & 201)
2009	MUSIC BOX BIE: Released: 25 June 2009; Label: GMM Grammy; Formats: CD; Track list: 1. มากมาย (Mak Mai); 2. 7 วันที่ฉันเหงา (Seven lonely days); 3. ซัมวัน (Someone); 4. เวท อะ มินิท (Wait a minute); 5. อยากขอสักคน... (I need somebody); 6. คนสำคัญ (Kon Sam Kan); 7. อยากถูกเรียกว่าแฟน (Yak Took Riak Wa Fan); 8. อดห่วงไม่ไหว (Od Huang Mai Wai); 9. โทรมา...ว่ารัก (Tor Ma...Wa Rak); 10. จังหวะหัวใจ (Heart rhythm); 11. รักแท้มีอยู่จริง (The real love exists TRUE); 12. ตัดใจไม่ไหว (Tad Jai Mai Wai); 13. Love at first sight 14. ความทรงจำในลมหายใจ" (The memory in the breath); 15. ไอ เลิฟ ยู ทู (I Love You Too); 16. กล่อม

=== Other special albums ===
Year	Title
2006	Nud Special: Released: 26 February 2007; Label: GMM Grammy; Formats: CD; Singles: โทรมาว่ารัก (Tor Ma Wa Rak); หลอกว่ารัก (Lok Wa Rak); Miss You; ฝันไปหรือเปล่า (Fan Pai Rue Pao); นัดกับนัด (Nad and Nad); กทม ที่รัก (Ko Tho Mo Tee Rak
2007	OST. Huajai Sila: Released: 7 July 2007; Label: GMM Grammy; Formats: CD; Singles: หัวใจของเธอ (Hua Jai Kong Ter); แค่ขอมีเธอ (Kae Ko Mee Ter); เจ้าของฉันคือเธอ (Jai Kong Chan Kue Ter); กล่อม (Klom)
2007	Original Soundtrack Banlang Mek The Musicals: Released: 19 August 2007; Label: GMM Grammy; Formats: CD; Singles: คนสำคัญ (Important Person)
2008	Original Soundtrack Behind The Painting The Musicals: Released: 2 August 2008; Label: GMM Grammy; Formats: CD; Singles: รักแท้มีอยู่จริง (Ruk Tae Mee Yoo Jing)(True Love Still Exist); คำว่ารัก (A Word of Love)
2008	Behind The Painting Pop Version: Released: 11 October 2008; Label: GMM Grammy; Formats: CD; Singles: รักแท้มีอยู่จริง (Ruk Tae Mee Yoo Jing)(True Love Still Exist); คำว่ารัก (A Word of Love)
2008	The Very Best of Cover Night Live & Easy: Released: 27 October 2008; Label: GMM Grammy; Formats: CD; Singles: เจ้าชายนิทรา (Sleeping Prince); เธอสวย (Yor're Beautiful); ไม่อยากให้เธอไว้ใจ (Don't believe in me)
2009	Acts Track 2: Released: 7 September 2009; Label: GMM Grammy; Formats: CD; Singles: ความทรงจำในลมหายใจ; คนที่เธอรัก (Feat. Vietrio); แค่คืบ (Khae Khub); หยาดเพชร (Yard Petch)

== Filmography ==
=== TV dramas ===
- 2006 Roy Adeed Hang Ruk (Thai: รอยอดีตแห่งรัก The past furrow of love) With Mew the star
- 2007 Hua Jai Sila (Thai: หัวใจศิลา The heart of rock) With Fang Pichaya
- 2009 Prajan See Roong (Thai: พระจันทร์สีรุ้ง Rainbow moon) With Taksaorn Paksukcharern
- 2010 Dok Ruk Rim Taang (Thai: ดอกรักริมทาง Crown flower at the edge of the road) With Wannarot Sonthichai
- 2011 Karm Wayla Tharm Ha Ruk (Thai: ข้ามเวลาตามหารัก Crossing the Time to Find Love) With Sinjai Plengpanich
- 2012 Khu Kam (Thai: คู่กรรม Sunset at Chaophraya) With Nuengthida Sophon
- 2014 Jatt Rak (Thai: จัดรัก Arranged Love) With Nuengthida Sophon
- 2017 You're My Destiny (Thai: เธอคือพรหมลิขิต You Are My Destiny) With Esther Supreeleela
- 2018 Pure Intention (Thai: พรหมไม่ได้ลิขิต Pure Intention) With Esther Supreeleela
- 2025 Justice Bao (Thai: เปาบุ้นจิ้น Justice Bao) With Ken Chu

=== Musical theatre ===
Theatregoers also know him well as Noppon in "Behind the Painting" and Pakorn in "Banlang Mek".

Year	Musicals	Performances
2007	Banlang Mek: As: Pakorn; Starring: Sukrit Wisetkaew - Nuengthida Sophon; Date Show: 27 September – 28 October, 14–22 December; Producer director: Thakonkiat Veerawan; Production by: Scenario; Place: Muangthai Ratchadalai Theatre	47
2008	Behind The Painting (Thai name: "Khang Lang Phap"): As: Nopporn; Starring: Sukrit Wisetkaew - Suthasinee Buddinan; Date Show: 21 August - 28 September, 17–26 October.; Sub Title: English, Japanese.; Producer director: Thakonkiat Veerawan; Production by: Scenario; Place: Muangthai Ratchadalai Theatre	49
2012	Rak/Jap/Jai (Full name: "Rak/Jap/Jai The Romantic Musical"): As: Sun; Starring:Sukrit Wisetkaew - Nuengthida Sophon; Date Show: 28 June - 15 July; Sub Title: English; Producer director: Thakonkiat Veerawan; Production by: Scenario; Place: Muangthai Ratchadalai Theatre; Buy Online Ruk Jub Jai - The Movie	49

=== Movie ===
Year	Movies
2014	Kid Tueng Wittaya (Full Name: "Kid Tueng Wittaya Teacher's Diary"): As: Kru Song; Starring: Sukrit Wisetkaew - Chermarn Boonyasak; Release Date: 20 March 2014 (Thailand); Sub Title: English; Director: Nithiwat Tharathorn; Producer: Jira Maligool, Chenchonnanee Soonthonsaratul, Suwimol Techasupinan, Wanruedee Pongsittisak; Writer: Nithiwat Tharathorn, Thodsapol Thiptinkorn, Suparuek Ningsanon, Sopana Chaoviwatkol; Production by: GTH; Runtime: 110 min.; Genre: Romance; Tagline: I miss someone who have never met before.; Language: Thai; Country: Thailand; Buy Online Teacher’s Diary(DVD)

=== Sitcoms ===
- 2007–2015 "Nud Kab Nud"
- 2016–2017 "Soot Ruk Chun La Moon"

=== Master of Ceremony: MC ON TV ===
- Television

Year	Thai title	Title	Network	Notes	With
20			Channel		

- Online

Year	Thai title	Title	Network	Notes	With
2021		REACTION	YouTube:BIE SUKRIT OFFICIAL		

== Concerts ==
=== Solo Concert ===
Year	Concert	Place
2008	Love Attack: Date Show: 24–25 May; 2 Performances	Impact Arena, BKK
2009	Love Mak Mai: Date Show: 11–12 July; 2 Performances	Impact Arena, BKK
2011	Love Mai Kua...Kua Mai Love: Date Show: 8–10 July; 3 Performances; Aug 13 Love On Tour at Khon Kaen; Aug 27 Love On Tour at Hat Yai; Sep 03 Love On Tour at Chiang Mai	Impact Arena, BKK: Aug 13 at Central Plaza Khon Kaen; Aug 27 at Lee Garden Hat Yai; Sep 03 at Central Plaza Airport Chiang Mai; Bie Sukrit original Concert DVDs

== Presenter ==
Bie is one of the most popular presenters, for many famous brand products, in Thailand. In early 2008, Bie was one of Top 5 Popular Presenters, by TV Pool poll. And by the end of year he was awarded "The Most Popular Presenter Award" from OHO awards 2008. In August 2009, he also won "King of Presenter" from Dao-Krajai at Channel 9, and Presenter of the year from Marketeer Magazine, December 2009.

Presenter	Agency	Year
Presenters for "Moral Support" campaign: Presenters for Princess Bajrakitiyabha's "Kumlung Jai" (Moral Support) campaign 2008	Princess Bajrakitiyabha's campaign	2008
Presenters of Stop violence towards children, women: Presenters of "Stop violence towards children, women and family violence" of Ministry of Social Development and Security	Ministry of Social Development and Security	2008
Presenter in the annual campaign against drugs: Presenter in the annual campaign against drugs 2008, "Tum Kwarm Dee Tum Kum Por" (Be Good For Father) under the "Diligence" category	Office of the Narcotics Control Board	2008
Presenter for "Health Support" campaign	Ministry of Public Health	2009–Present
Ambassadors for Act' Channel: Ambassadors: Aom Piyada, Pong Nawat, Bie Sukrit.	Act' Channel of Exact	2009–Present
Soy Milk Foremost Hi5	ForeMost	2006–2008
Sony Cyber-shot: Sony Cyber-shot W 200; Sony Cyber-shot W 201; Sony Cyber-shot W170; Sony Cyber-shot T 77; Sony Cyber-shot T 170; Sony Cyber-shot T 90; Sony Cyber-shot T 900 ( Tseries )	Sony	2007–Present
I Mobile Hitz 101, 201	I Mobile	2008–2009
Honda Click-i	Honda	2008–Present
Cloret Mint	Cloret	2009–Present
Yum Yum Noodle	Yum Yum	2009–Present
Kao Shong Coffee: Kao Shong Coffee mix 3 in 1; Espresso; Capuchino; Mocca; Milk; Kao Shong	Kao Shong	2010–present
Muang Thai Unit Link	Muang Thai Life Assurance	2010–present

== Awards ==
Year	Awards
2007	In Young Generation Choice : 'Love Song of the Year (I Need Somebody)'; 2007 Thailand SEED Awards : 'Popular Vote Song of the Year (I Need Somebody)'; 2007 Vergin Hitz Awards : 'Vergin Hitz Song of the Year' "Tor Ma Wa Rak"; 2007 Star Entertainment Awards : 'Popular Song Award (I Need Somebody)'
2008	2008 Audition Music Awards : 'Best Male Artist Award'; 2008 Siam Dara Stars Party : 'Popular Singer Award'; 2008 Young & Smart Vote Sudsabda Awards : 'Popular Vote Artist Award'
2009	Top Awards 2008 : 'Best Male Artist Award'; Nine Entertainment Awards 2009 : 'Star Most Popular Vote Award'; Thailand OHO Awards 2009 : 'Most Popular Presenter of the Year Award'; Thailand TV Inside Hot Awards 2009 : 'Hot Male Artist of the Year Award'; Channel 9 Doa Kra Jai : 'King Of Presenter Award'; Diamond Song Award Best Rendition in Thai : 'Contemporary Music Male Singer - "Jed Wan Tee Chan Ngao"(Seven lonely days)'; Ministry of Education : 'Outstanding Youth Award 2009'; Ministry of Social Development and Human Security : 'Award for "Filial Children toward their Mothers" on Mother's Day 2009'; Mental Health Media Award 2009 : 'Prajan See Roong'(Rainbow Moon) Drama; 2009 Young & Smart Vote Sudsabda Awards : 'Popular Vote Artist Award'
2010	Kom Chud Luek Awards 2009 : Popular Actor Award; Top Awards 2009 : Best Singer Award; Gmember Awards 2009 : Top Famous Song of the Year "Mak Mai"; Gmember Awards 2009 : Singer of the Year; TV Gold Awards 2010 : Best Music Video Award - "Hug"; Nine Entertainment Awards 2010 : TV Series of The Year "Prajan See Roong"(Rainbow Moon); Nine Entertainment Awards 2010 : Star Most Popular Vote Award; Seed Awards 2010 : Popular Artist Award From Album "Hug Bie"; Star Entertainment Awards 2009 : Popular Male Singer Award From Album "Hug Bie"; Siam Dara Stars Awards 2010 : The Best Drama Award "Prajan See Roong"(Rainbow Moon); Siam Dara Stars Awards 2010 : Star Most Popular Vote Award; Diamond Song Award Best Rendition in Thai : 'Contemporary Music Male Singer - "Kom sug jam nai lom hai jai"(The memory in the breath)
2011	Gmember Awards 2010 : Singer of the Year; Maya Popular Vote : Popular Vote Artist Award; Seed Awards 2011 : Popular Artist of The Year Award; Nine Entertainment Awards 2011 : Star Most Popular Vote Award; Bang Awards 2011 : Favorite Solo Artist; Daradaily The GREAT Awards 2011 : Singer of the Year; China TV Drama Awards 2011 : The Best Foreign Drama Of The Year; 2011 Young & Smart Vote Sudsabda Awards : 'Popular Vote Artist Award'
2012	Kom Chud Luek Awards 2011 : Popular Artist Award; Nine Entertainment Awards 2012 : Star Most Popular Vote Award; Kerd Awards 2012 : Born to be Popular Award; Gmember Awards 2011 : Album of the Year From Album "Rak na kha"; Bang Awards 2012 : Favorite Album "Na But Now"
2013	Top Awards 2012 : 'Best Male Artist Award'; Gmember Awards 2013 : Singer of the Year; Daradaily The GREAT Awards 2013 : Singer of the Year; Nine Entertainment Awards 2013 : Star Most Popular Vote Award; Kazz Awards 2013 : Male Superstar of the Year; Bang Awards 2013 : Favorite Album "Ruk Jub Jai"; 2013 Thailand Sina Weibo Night & ManGu Magazine 1st year Anniversary : Chinese’s Favorite Thai Singer
2014	Gmember Awards 2014 : Favorite Male Artist of the Year; EFM Awards 2014 : Favorite Album of April "Ruk Tae Plare Wa Thur"; EFM Awards 2014 : Favorite Album of October "Young Wang"; Playpark Music Awards 2014 : Favorite Male Artist of the Year; Bang Awards 2014 : Favorite Album "Ra Wang Kon Kam Lung Ngao"
2015	Gmember Awards 2015 : Favorite Male Artist of the Year
