= Love Is (record label) =

Love Is LOVEiS เลิฟอีส
- Founded: 2004
- Founder: Kamol Sukosol Clapp; Boyd Kosiyabong
- Distributor(s): Sony BEC-TERO Music; Warner Music Thailand (2020 - Present)
- Genre: Various
- Country of origin: Thailand
- Location: Bangkok, Thailand

Love Is (Thai:เลิฟอีส), also stylized as LOVEiS, is a record label founded in 2004 by Boyd Kosiyabong and Kamol Sukosol Clapp, co-founders of Bakery Music (now a division of Sony Music Entertainment).

== Artists ==
- Boyd Kosiyabong
- Room 39
- Meme Nopparat
- Pru
  - Kamol Sukosol Clapp
- 7th Scene
  - Stamp Apiwat
- Friday
  - Zentrady
- Two Popetorn
- TOR+
- Sweat16!
- SBFIVE
- Now United
- MOBye

== See also ==
- List of record labels
- Bakery Music
