= Boyd Kosiyabong =

Thai singer-songwriter and music producer

Boyd Kosiyabong ชีวิน (บอย) โกสิยพงษ์
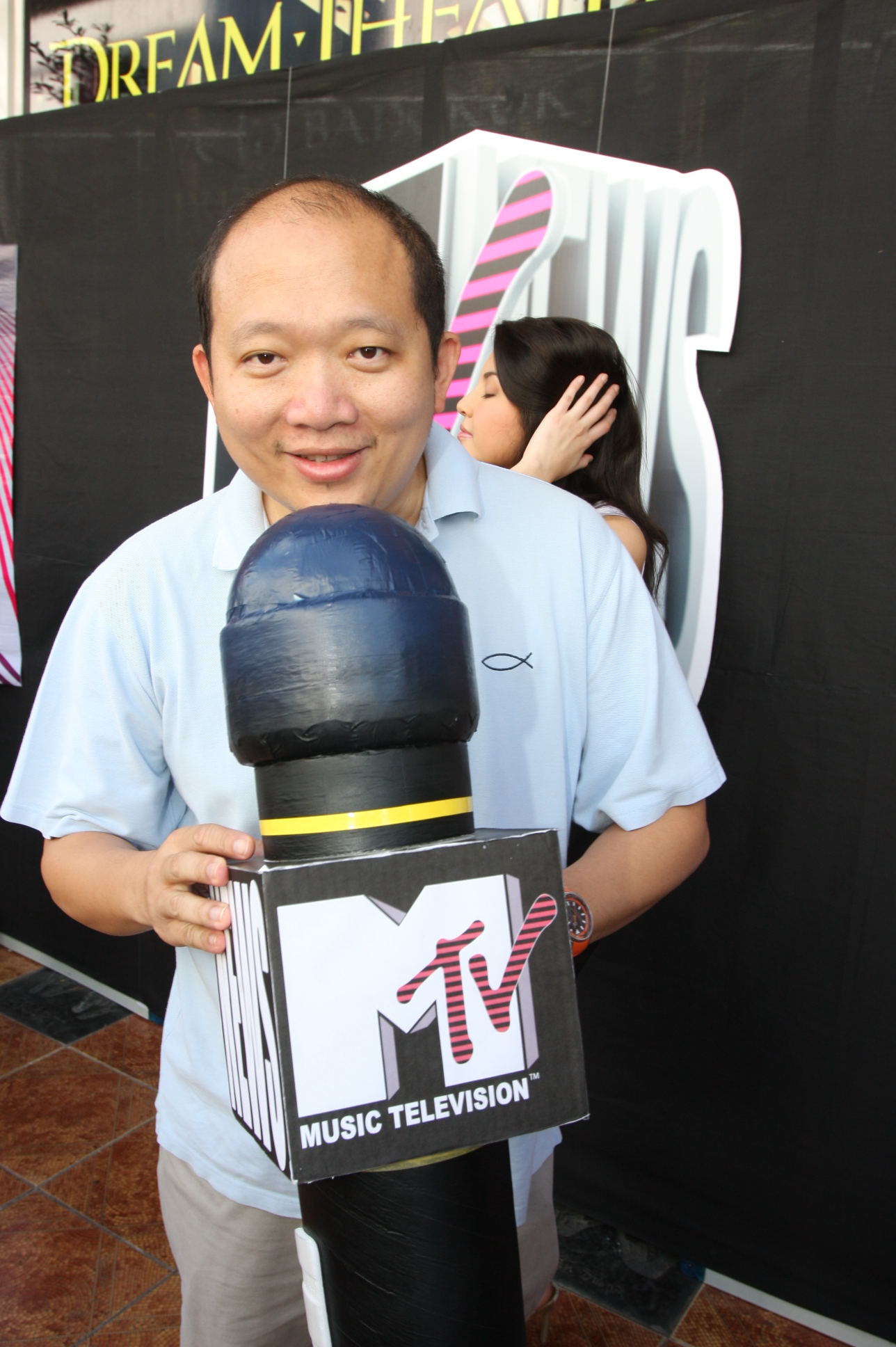
- Boyd at an MTV press event, November 2007

Background information
- Born: Cheewin Kosiyabong; 5 September 1967 (age 58); Bangkok, Thailand
- Genres: R&B
- Occupations: Composer; singer-songwriter; producer
- Labels: Bakery Music; Love Is; Sony Music Thailand
- Website: Archived 16 December 2008 at the Wayback Machine

Cheewin "Boyd" Kosiyabong (Thai: ชีวิน (บอย) โกสิยพงษ์) is a Thai singer-songwriter and music producer of the R&B genre whose inspirational songs and romantic ballads include multiple chart-toppers.

== Biography ==
Boyd Kosiyabong was born on 5 September 1967, the third of five children. Having great interest in animated cartoons and music, he started taking piano lessons by the age of four but soon had to give up formal lessons which could not satisfy his specific interest in cartoon soundtracks. He became self-taught afterwards, learning to play the theme songs of his favourite cartoons and beginning to compose by the time he was in sixth grade.

He had wished to study animation, but being unable to do so he followed the path of his other interest, music. He studied song writing, electronic music and music business at University of California, Los Angeles.

Early in his career he worked as a freelance songwriter for musical artists and advertising. After a few years, he joined Kamol Sukosol Clapp, Somkiat Ariyachaipanich and Salinee Panyarachun in founding Bakery Music, an independent music label, in 1994. Among the first of the label's acts was Modern Dog, which quickly proved successful.

Boyd was widely noted for his roles as composer and manager of Bakery Music. His compositions were mainly romantic and inspirational songs, such as Seasons Change, which topped the charts upon its release in 1995 and later became the namesake of the 2007 film of the same name.

With the rapid growth of Bakery Music, Boyd began expanding investments into the other businesses, founding the animation studio Be Boyd Characters (now Be Boyd CG) in 1997, while partner Somkiat created the Dojo City label, which catered to young female audiences, and Bakery Music also expanded into publishing, with the magazines Katch and Manga Katch.

However, the company later faced management and economic issues, and was acquired in 2000 by BMG, which in turn merged with Sony Music Entertainment to become Sony BMG in 2004. At this point, Boyd, along with the original founders of Bakery Music, left the management, while Bakery Music remains today as a sublabel of Sony.

Boyd and Kamol Sukosol Clapp then formed a new partnership and created a new label, Love Is, in 2004. Kamol later left to work in other businesses, and Love Is was restructured as a production house company.

== Personal life ==
Boyd is a devout Christian and attends church every Sunday. He is married to Worakanya Kosiyabong and has two daughters, D-Jai and Jai-D.

== Discography ==
- BOYd E.P. (1994)
- Rhythm & BOYd (1995)
- Seasons Change Remixes (1995)
- One E.P (1996)
- Simplified (1996)
- Thanks (1997)
- File (Special Album) (1998)
- Delite (Single) (1998)
- Listen To Me (Single) (1999)
- Songs From Different Scenes (2002)
- Pho (พอ) (Single) (2002)
- Million Ways To Love Part I (2003)
- Melodies for Our Mothers (2003)
- Songs From Different Scenes #2 (2003)
- Songs From Different Scenes #3 (2004)
- Popular Songbook (compilation) (2004)
- Kindly Delite (2005)
- Songs From Different Scenes #4 (2005)
- Rhythm & Boyd Eleventh (2006)
- Boyd & Bundit (2007)
- Bittersweet (with Thanachai Ujjin) (2007)
- Songs from Different Scenes #5 (2008)
- Nak (2008)
