= Endorphine (band) =

Endorphine (Da Endorphine)
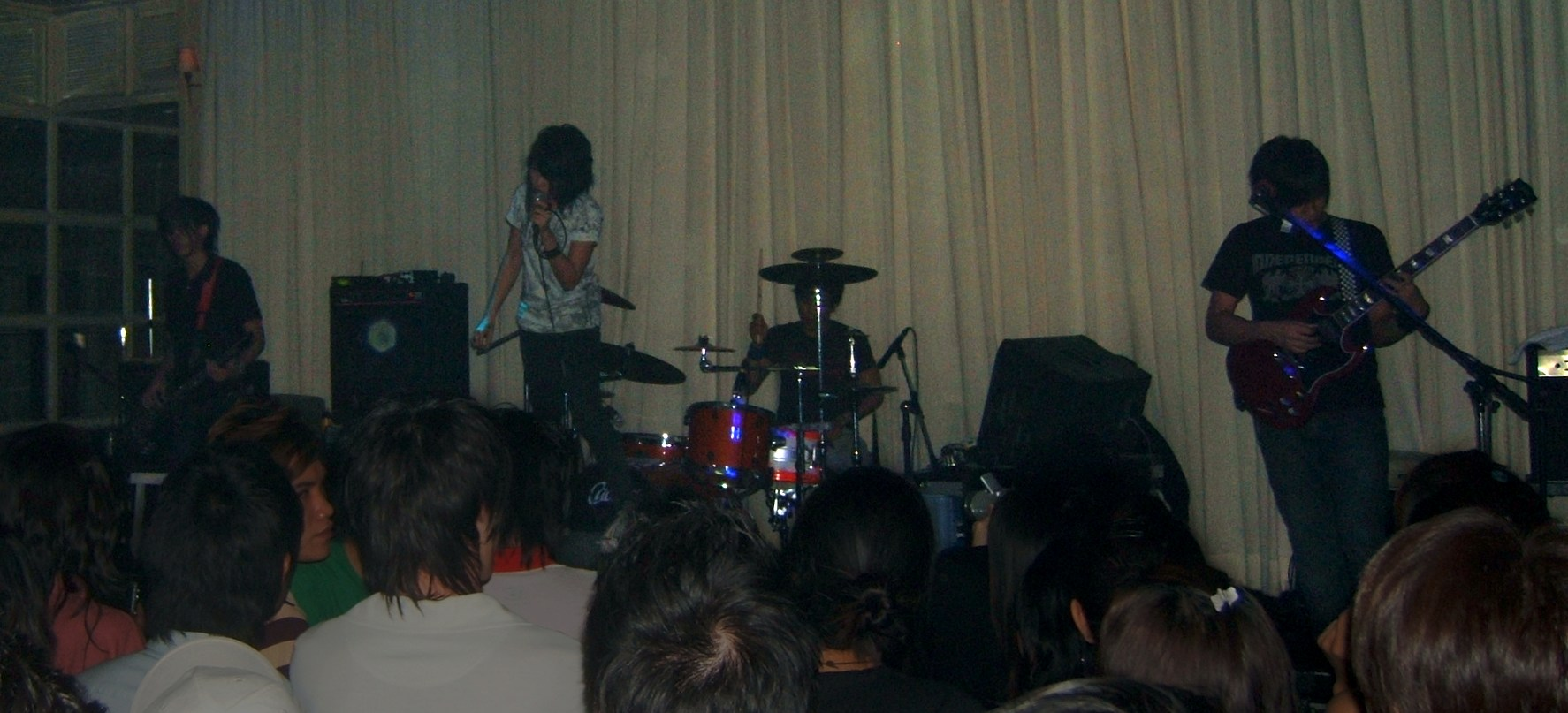
- Performing in Bangkok, Thailand, August 2007

Background information
- Origin: Bangkok, Thailand
- Genres: Thai rock, Rock, Thai pop, Pop
- Years active: 2004–2006
- Labels: BullDog & GMM Grammy
- Members: Thanida Thamwimon (Da); Anucha Boethongkhamkul (Kia); Thanat Amornmanus (Bird); Thapaphol Amornmanus (Bomb)

Endorphine was one of the most popular Thai rock bands in Thailand. The band consisted of Da (lead vocals), Kia (guitar), Bird (bass), and Bomb (drums):

- Thanida Thamwimon (Da): lead vocals
- Anucha Boethongkhamkul (Kia): guitar
- Thanat Amornmanus (Bird): bass guitar
- Thapaphol Amornmanus (Bomb): percussion

After 2 studio albums, Endorphine was disbanded while the lead vocalist went solo as Da Endorphine. She released several more albums and won many awards for her work.

== History & Name Meaning ==
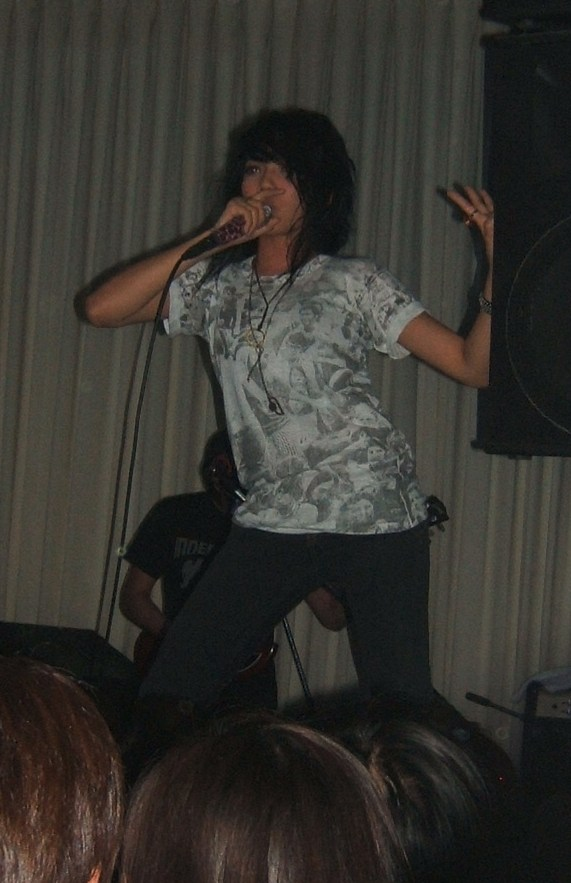
Singer Da during an August 2007 concert

The band started in junior high school. Friends, Bomb (drums) and Kia (guitar) decided to form a band and asked Bomb's brother Bird (bass) to join in. They decided they needed a lead vocalist, and that is when Da came in. Impressed with Da's unique and powerful voice, the band asked her to join. “Since we played rock music, we never thought our lead singer would be a girl,” Bomb said. “But when we heard Da sing, we knew she was the missing piece.”

They were almost set, but there was still one other thing they needed — the right name. Stuck in traffic one day, Bomb spotted a bumper sticker that had the word “endorphine” written on it. Curious, Bomb looked the word up and found the perfect name for his band. “Endorphins are a chemical substance produced by the brain when we’re happy or in pain,” Bomb said. “And we want people to be happy listening to our songs. Hence the name Endorphine.”

== Discography ==
=== Endorphine ===
- Prik (พริก, Chili) (2004)
- Replay (2004)
- Sakkawa 49 (สักวา 49) (2005)

=== Da Endorphine ===
- Pahp Luang Tah (ภาพลวงตา) (2007)
- Sound About (2008)
- Saen Saeb (แสนแสบ) (2009)
- Dok Mai Fai (ดอกไม้ไฟ) (2011)

=== Other albums with Endorphine or Da Endorphine appearance ===
Incomplete list:

- Narongvit - Sleepless Society 2 (2006)
- The Best Of - Love Issue (2006)

== Popular songs ==
- Sing Tee Chan Rian Roo (สิ่งที่ฉันเรียนรู้) (What I've Learned)
- Khuen Kham Pee (คืนข้ามปี) (New Year's Eve)
- Praw Ther (เพราะเธอ) (Because of You)
- Ther Bog Hai Leum (เธอบอกให้ลืม) (You Told Me to Forget)
- Dao Gra Dad (ดาวกระดาษ) (Paper Star)
- Glua Ter Ja Pid Wung (กลัวเธอจะผิดหวัง) (Afraid You'll Be Disappointed)
- Prung Nee Mai Sai (พรุ่งนี้ไม่สาย) (Tomorrow Is Not Too Late)
- Mai Tong Roo Wa Rao Kob Kun Bab Nai (ไม่ต้องรู้ว่าเราคบกันแบบไหน) (No Need to Know How We're Involved With One Another)
- Mai Roo Chak Chan Mai Roo Chak Ther (ไม่รู้จักฉันไม่รู้จักเธอ) feat. Pop Calories Blah...Blah OST. Sai Lub jub barn lek(สายลับจับบ้านเล็ก)
- Dai Yin Mai(ได้ยินไหม)(Do you hear Me?)
- Dok Rahtree (Night-blooming jasmine; คาราโอเกะ)

=== Singles ===
Puan-Sa-Nit (เพื่อนสนิท) (Best/Close Friends) charted at no. 1 in Thailand.

== Awards ==
Incomplete list of awards for Endorphine

1. Royal Golden Lord Kanesha Award (รางวัลพระพิฆเณศทองคำพระราชทาน) (Best Thai-International Song: Puan-Sa-Nit) 2004
2. Virgin Hitz Awards (Hitz 40) 2004

Incomplete list of awards for Da Endorphine

1. Virgin Hitz Awards (Most Popular Song of the Year: Total 5 Songs Khuen Kam Pee (คืนข้ามปี), Kham Kho Sud Thai (คำขอสุดท้าย), Raksa Sit (รักษาสิทธิ์), Thi Hen Lae Pen Yu (ที่เห็นและเป็นอยู่) and Pab Luong Ta (ภาพลวงตา) in album Prik) 2007
2. Seed Awards (Seed Female Artist of the Year) 2007
3. Star Entertainment Award (Popular Female Artist) 2007
4. Season Awards (Best Female Artist of the Year) 2008
5. Siamdara Stars Party (Popular Female Singer - Thai-International Song) 2008
6. Seed Awards (Seed Female Artist of the Year) 2009
7. Star Entertainment Award (Popular Female Singer) 2010
8. Siamdara Stars Awards (Popular Female Singer - Thai-International Song) 2010
9. Nine Entertain Awards (Female Artist of the Year) 2010
10. Nataraj Award (รางวัลนาฏราช) (Best TV Series OST Hai Rak Doen Tang Ma Choe Kan (ให้รักเดินทางมาเจอกัน)) 2011
11. Season Awards (Best Female Artist of the Year) 2012
12. Manimekhala Awards (รางวัลมณีเมขลา) (Popular Female Singer - Thai-International Song) 2012
