= All We Need Is Love =

All We Need Is Love may refer to:

- All We Need Is Love (album), a 2019 album by Stefanie Heinzmann
- "All We Need Is Love" (song), 2014 song by Ricki-Lee Coulter
- "All We Need Is Love", a 2000 single by Landsholdet, the Denmark national football team
- "All We Need Is Love", a song by Ric Ocasek from the 1991 album Fireball Zone
- "All We Need Is Love", a song by Elizabeth Cook from the album This Side of the Moon
- "All We Need Is Love", a song by the Leningrad Cowboys from the 2011 album Buena Vodka Social Club
- "All We Need Is Love (Christmas in the Yard)", a song by The Big Yard Family featuring Shaggy from Now That's What I Call Christmas!
- "All We Need Is Love", a 1977 single by Kelly Marie

== See also ==
- All You Need Is Love (disambiguation)
