= Hey Y'all =

Album by Elizabeth Cook

Studio album by Elizabeth Cook
- Released: August 27, 2002
- Recorded: Spring 2001
- Studios: Javelina Studios, The Hum Depot, The Soundshop and Vital Recording (Nashville, Tennessee); Sound Kitchen (Franklin, Tennessee)
- Genre: Country
- Length: 42:37
- Label: Warner Bros. Records
- Producer: Richard Dodd (also exec.)

Elizabeth Cook chronology
The Blue Album (2000)	Hey Y'all (2002)	This Side of the Moon (2004)

Singles from Hey Y'all
- 1. "Stupid Things" Released: July 29, 2002

Hey Y'all is the second studio album by the American singer Elizabeth Cook, released on August 27, 2002, by the Warner Bros. Records record label. The album was the first time its executive producer, Richard Dodd, had worked in country music. A majority of the songs were written by Cook and the songwriter Hardie McGehee, who shared a music publisher. Prior to Hey Y'all, Cook had independently released her debut studio album, The Blue Album (2000), and performed over 100 times at the Grand Ole Opry. She signed a deal with Atlantic Records but was later transferred to Warner Bros. after AOL-Time Warner closed Atlantic's Nashville office. Hey Y'all was Cook's debut on a major record label.

A country album, Hey Y'all includes influences from other genres, such as gospel, honky-tonk, and pop. The lyrics focus on Cook's childhood and personal life, as well as on more sexual topics. It was recorded at Javeline Studios, the Hum Depot, and Vital Recording in Nashville and Sound Kitchen in Franklin, Tennessee. Reviewers attributed a twangy quality to Cook's voice, which they likened to that of other country singers, including Dolly Parton.

Reviews were generally positive from critics, who praised the album's traditional country sound and Cook's songwriting. Retrospective reviews remained positive, although some commentators have said that Cook's later releases were stronger. The album's lead single, "Stupid Things", was promoted with a music video. Media outlets reported that the song received little airplay because of record-label issues and a belief it was too country. Hey Y'all was commercially unsuccessful, was not played on country radio, and was not heavily promoted. Although Warner Bros. executives discussed the possibility of a follow-up album, Cook left the label in 2003 and pursued a career in independent music.

== Background and recording ==
In 2000, Elizabeth Cook independently released her debut self-titled album, also known as The Blue Album, which consisted of demos she recorded between 1997 and 2000. Cook started the album while working as a songwriter for the publishing company Sis 'N Bro Music in Nashville. Her co-worker Jeff Gordon had inspired the idea and produced all of the songs. In a 2002 Country Standard Time interview, Cook recalled that she handled the album's release herself, like how she printed the cover herself at Kinko's. Five songs from the album ("Everyday Sunshine", "Don't Bother Me", "Blue Shades", "Demon", and "Mama You Wanted to Be a Singer Too") were included on Hey Y'all.

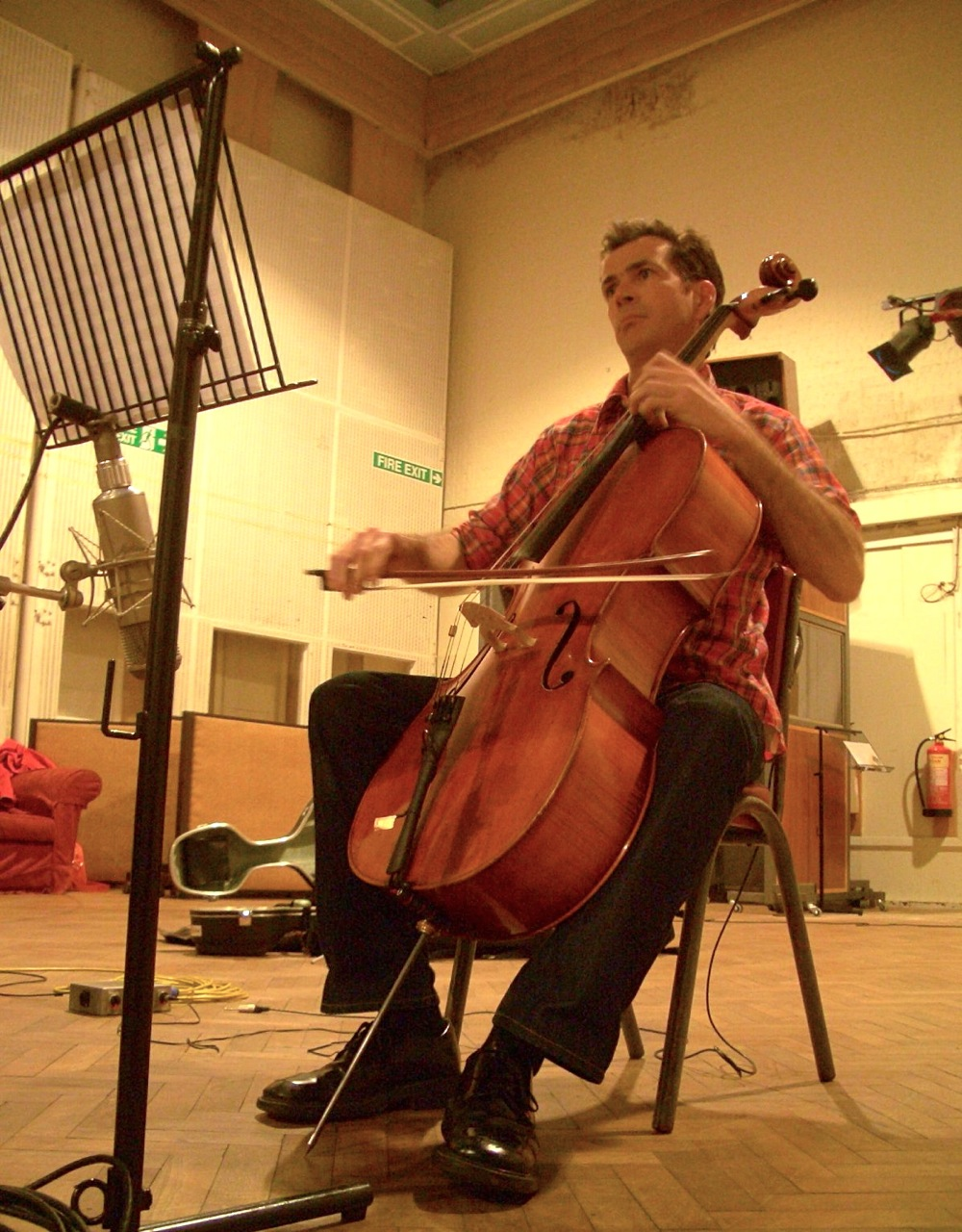
Elizabeth Cook collaborated with producer Richard Dodd (pictured in 2014) to avoid following then-popular music trends.

During a Christmas party and a later lunch, Cook met Pete Fisher, a manager at the Grand Ole Opry, and was invited to sing at the theater. She performed Kitty Wells' "Making Believe" (1955) with the house band. According to Cook, the Grand Ole Opry was spotlighting unsigned artists, and she believed she "came along and fit the bill at the right time". Cook went on to perform over 100 times at the Grand Ole Opry, sometimes replacing singers who had cancelled. Before each performance, Cook asked the audience the same question: "Are y'all ready for some country music?" AllMusic's Robert L. Doerschuk wrote that these experiences had "built strong ties to the audience most likely to respond to her debut album". For Hey Y'all, Cook collaborated with performers she met at the Grand Ole Opry, including the Whites and the Carol Lee Singers.

After the critical acclaim of The Blue Album, Atlantic Records approached Cook with a record deal. Subsequently, Hey Y'all was recorded at Javeline Studios, the Hum Depot, and Vital Recording in Nashville, Tennessee, and Sound Kitchen in Franklin, Tennessee; the recording process started in the spring of 2001. When asked about her approach for the album, Cook said she wanted to create a sound that balanced her artistic integrity with commercial appeal. For its production, she approached Richard Dodd, although he had never worked on a country album; she picked Dodd to avoid the "obvious go-to guys", believing the style at the time was "a little tired", to have a more individualized sound. Along with being the album's executive producer, Dodd produced all of its songs. For the album's recording, he had people play instruments in one studio so the sounds would blend together. According to The Tennessean's Craig Havighurst, it was an atypical recording technique for a major record label.

Cook has writing credits on all of the album's songs, except for her cover of Jessi Colter's "I'm Not Lisa" (1975). Seven of the album's twelve tracks were written by Cook and songwriter Hardie McGehee, with whom she worked with because they were signed to the same music publisher. Cook has three solo writing credits on the album, and co-wrote a song with her then-fiancé Tim Carroll. Several of the songs are autobiographical, such as "Dolly" which was inspired by a meeting with record label executives. Cook recounted that time as being frustrating, saying: "I was good and unique and all this stuff but nobody was offering me a deal." She composed the lyrics for "Dolly" in a shower after that meeting.

== Composition and lyrics ==
=== Sound ===
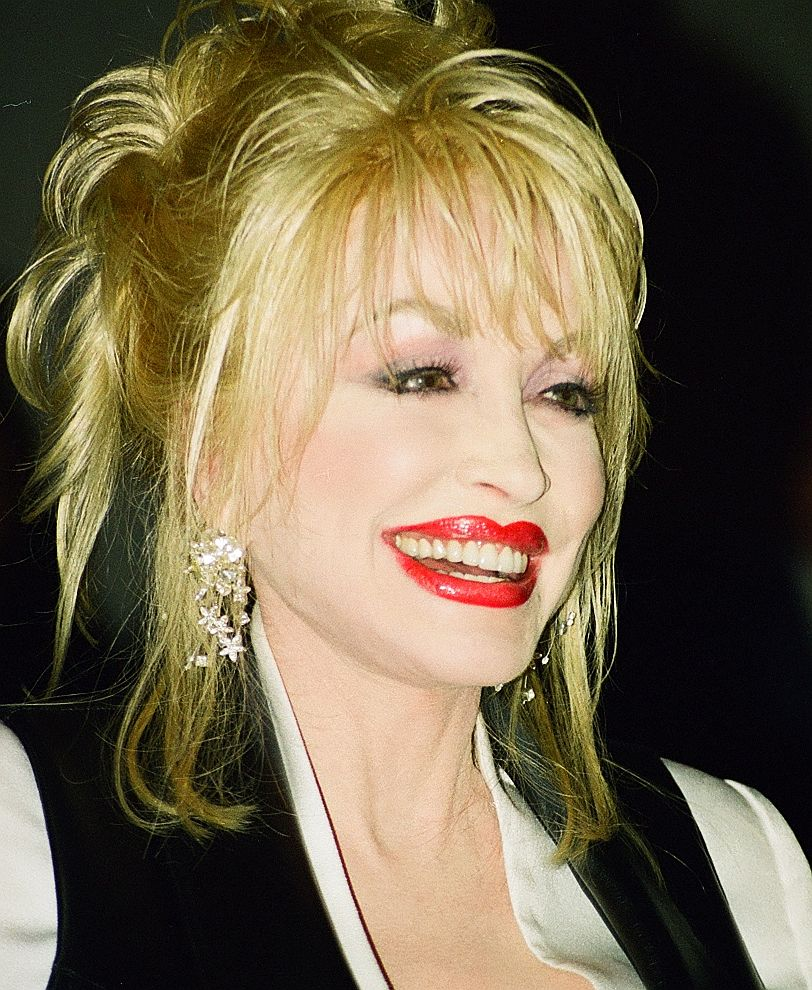
Critics likened Cook's voice to Dolly Parton (pictured in 2003), to whom she dedicated a song on Hey Y'all.

Hey Y'all is a twelve-track country album. Billboard's Melinda Newman described its style as traditional country, writing that Cook indicated "the future of country music is a return to its hardcore roots". In a 2016 Rolling Stone article, Stephen L. Betts summed up the album's as "unapologetically country". Patrick Langston, writing for the Ottawa Citizen, compared the hooks and arrangements to 1950s and 1960s country music. In a 2016 article for the Chicago Tribune, Steven Knopper said Hey Y'all represented Cook's "folksy sense of humor". Langston also characterized the album through her humor, which he called "sunny".

Critics identified several musical influences throughout the album, including gospel, honky-tonk, shuffle, and torch songs. According to Style Weekly's Mike Hilleary, Cook had become known for "her loyalty to old-time honky-tonk and weeping country ballads" after the release of Hey Y'all. Billboard's Phyllis Stark and the Associated Press' Jim Patterson identified pop influences on the album; Patterson remarked that the album's instrumentals used "jangly pop guitars". The songs' productions also featured steel guitars and cellos.

Some critics compared Cook's vocals to those of Loretta Lynn, Deana Carter, Kelly Willis, and Dolly Parton. Reviewers also noted a twangy quality in her voice, which Paterson described her vocal range as being a "twangy, sexy soprano". Robert L. Doerschuk said Cook had a "nasal intonation and Southern lilt", and Langston wrote that she sounded "high, slightly pinched". Craig Havighurst characterized Cook as singing with a "willowy, wiry drawl". When describing her tone, Newman believed Cook was "often plaintive" throughout the album.

=== Songs ===
According to a Billboard writer, the album's lyrics revolve around Cook's experiences living "the hard-knock life". A commentator for the National Post said Hey Y'all was composed of "sexually charged honky tonkers" and "classic weepers". When discussing Hey Y'all's first set of songs, Newman wrote that "the twang factor goes to 11". The opening track is "Stupid Things", which Doerschuk said has a "barn-dance hook". Larry Aydlette, writing for The Palm Beach Post, remarked that "Stupid Things", as well as "Demon", had more "modern sensibilities" than the album's more traditional songs. The second track "Rainbows at Midnight" delves into a break-up.

"I'm Not Lisa"
Craig Havighurst described Cook's cover of "I'm Not Lisa" as having a "country-politan" approach, which he said represented the overall album's "old-meets-new atmosphere".

"Don't Bother Me"
A contributor for the National Post cited "Don't Bother Me" as one of the album's "classic weepers". Mike Hilleary said Cook became connected with this type of "weeping country ballads" because of Hey Y'all.

The third song, "Mama You Wanted to Be a Singer Too", is a ballad about Cook's mother who dreamed of becoming a country singer. Using lyrics referring to Tammy Wynette and Loretta Lynn, Cook sings that she succeeded while her mother had five children with a man who abandoned her. For the fourth track "Dolly", Cook asks Parton questions about the music industry, specifically how to handle "hound-dog men and pushy record companies". The song has an acoustic melody with lyrics like: "Now I know some girls that sing and look good / But don't have a whole lot under the hood / Dolly, did you go through this?" In the National Post, a reviewer likened the arrangement for Cook's cover of "I'm Not Lisa" to Roy Orbison's music.

The sixth song "Everyday Sunshine" has influences from pop music. For "Demon", Cook sings about sensual desire over a blues instrumental. Doerschuk described the track as a "finger-wag warning set to a honky-tonk saunter". The following song, "Blue Shades", has lyrics about heartbreak and an instrumental built around "classic old-time harmonies and medium-tempo rockabilly sway". The "country shuffle" track includes vocals from the Carol Lee Singers. The ballad "Don't Bother Me" features a spoken word portion by Bill Anderson; The Index-Journal's Paulette Flowers wrote that Anderson contributes "his trademark 'Whisperin' Bill' recitation" to the song. For the gospel song "God's Got a Plan", Flowers said it had a similar sound to the Whites.

The album closes with the ballad "Ocala", in which Cook sings about the city of Ocala, Florida. Although Cook described it as the "song for my homeland", she actually grew up in Wildwood, Florida; she dedicated the song to the nearby Ocala instead since she believed "some people had at least heard of it". "Ocala" includes lyrics like: "Snowbirds come from way up north / Me and my daddy shake our heads / Wonder why they ever left." The song's instrumental includes a mandolin played by Darrell Scott, and sounds from Florida swamps.

== Release and promotion ==
"Stupid Things" was released as the album's lead single on July 29, 2002. It was promoted with a music video, which was played on country video networks in September 2002. The single was sent to country radio and received a positive response from music directors, but it did not receive any airplay following complications with the label. In a 2003 article, a contributor for The Tennessean questioned whether the lack of airplay occurred because of issues with the label or radio stations. In a 2011 CMT article, Craig Shelburne said that the song was commercially unsuccessful because of criticisms that it was "too country". Responding to this feedback, Cook said: "It's not for everybody, because it does have a very country, in-your-face sound". On the other hand, a reviewer for The Greenville News said "Stupid Things" was an instance that the album significantly leaned towards a pop sound, but thought Cook's accent made everything still sound like country music. During a 2002 live performance of "Stupid Things", she introduced it by saying: "This one was allegedly a single."

While Cook was recording the album, AOL-Time Warner—which owned Atlantic Records—closed its Nashville office and she was then transferred to Atlantic's parent company Warner Bros. Initially set for a September 17 release, Hey Y'all was made available on August 27, 2002, instead on audio CD, cassette, and digital download formats. The album was later released on streaming services. The packaging included a picture of Cook as a child; in it, she is wearing a suit while sitting on a man's shoulder. The album was Cook's debut on a major record label.

Cook referred to the album's promotion as a grassroots campaign, explaining that it would "focus on markets that we feel we can get traditional music played". On August 24, 2002, Cook performed "Stupid Things" as well as a stripped-down cover of Ray Price's "Crazy Arms" (1956) at the Grand Ole Opry. She further promoted Hey Y'all through live performances at the Music Row district in Nashville, Tennessee and the 12th & Porter music venue in the city's downtown area. Along with these live performances, Cook was interviewed on Don Imus' radio show. She was also a feature story in The Tennessean's Life section on September 15, 2002; the newspaper published a follow-up article on Cook, as well as other people covered in that year's Life sections, on December 29. A Music Row publicist questioned why Cook deserved an article over more famous musicians like Garth Brooks. "You Move Too Fast" was included on the New West Records compilation album The Imus Ranch Record (2010). In a review for the New York Daily News, David Hinckley wrote that it was one of the most country songs on the album.

== Critical reception ==
Professional ratings
Review scores
Source	Rating
AllMusic	4/5 stars
Associated Press	3/5 stars
Dayton Daily News	B
The Greenville News	3.5/5 stars
Ottawa Citizen	4/5 stars
The Palm Beach Post	B+
The Tennessean	3/5 stars

Hey Y'all received a positive response from critics. In Country Weekly, Cook was named one of the top ten "brightest stars" of 2002. Several reviewers enjoyed the album's traditional country sound, such as Phyllis Stark who believed Cook's "distinctive drawl and hardcore country delivery" pulled the album together. Calling Cook "delightfully" country, Paulette Flowers applauded her choice to release "genuine Grade-A country" music. Country Standard Time's Clarissa Sansone praised Hey Y'all as referencing the "prairie-skirt heyday of Dolly and Emmylou" instead of attempting to be crossover music like Shania Twain and Faith Hill. Larry Aydlette said although Cook initially looked like an attempt to mimic Twain, she is set apart by her "healthy respect for serious country music" as shown by her choice to cover "I'm Not Lisa" and include Bill Anderson on "Don't Bother Me". While describing Cook's voice as having a "Dolly Parton sweetness", Patrick Langston commended her for being able to convey more emotions than Twain. Jim Patterson wrote that Richard Dodd's production helped to elevate Hey Y'all from being just "the perfect-yet-boring Nashville norm".

Some reviewers highlighted Cook's songwriting, including Dayton Daily News's Lawrence Budd who said the album showed her as a "singer-songwriter with stories to share". Robert L. Doerschuk remarked that Cook used her songwriting to connect with "a more conservative aesthetic" instead of following popular trends in contemporary country music. Despite their criticism of the album's "hick title", a contributor for The Greenville News commended Cook for writing with "vivid immediacy and smartness". Patterson described Cook as a "great writer, taking on with sly wit topics such as her own quest for stardom", and singled out "Everyday Sunshine" and "Stupid Things" as "well-written pop confections". Flowers cited Cook's more autobiographical songs, specifically "Mama You Wanted to Be a Singer Too", as the album's highlights. Although Melinda Newman praised Cook's songwriting for tracks like "Dolly", she criticized her as having "a certain naiveté that may have worked in the '60s or '70s that sometimes wears a little thin here".

Retrospective reviews remained positive. In a 2004 article for The Tennessean, Peter Cooper praised Hey Y'all as "one of the finer Music Row works of the new millennium". The same year, Tim Ghianni, writing for the same publication, described it as "one of the best pure country efforts of the century". Other critics praised Hey Y'all, but believed Cook's music improved with her subsequent releases. In 2005, The Philadelphia Inquirer's Nick Cristiano said Cook deserved more commercial success with Hey Y'all, but noted that she improved with her follow-up album This Side of the Moon (2004). When discussing Cook's transition to independent music, Cristiano wrote that "the disappointment obviously didn't dull her artistry". In a 2011 Nashville Scene article, Edd Hurt believed The Blue Album and Hey Y'all had "their moments", but said Cook had really "hit her stride" with "Sometimes It Takes Balls To Be a Woman", a single from her fourth studio album Balls (2007).

== Aftermath ==
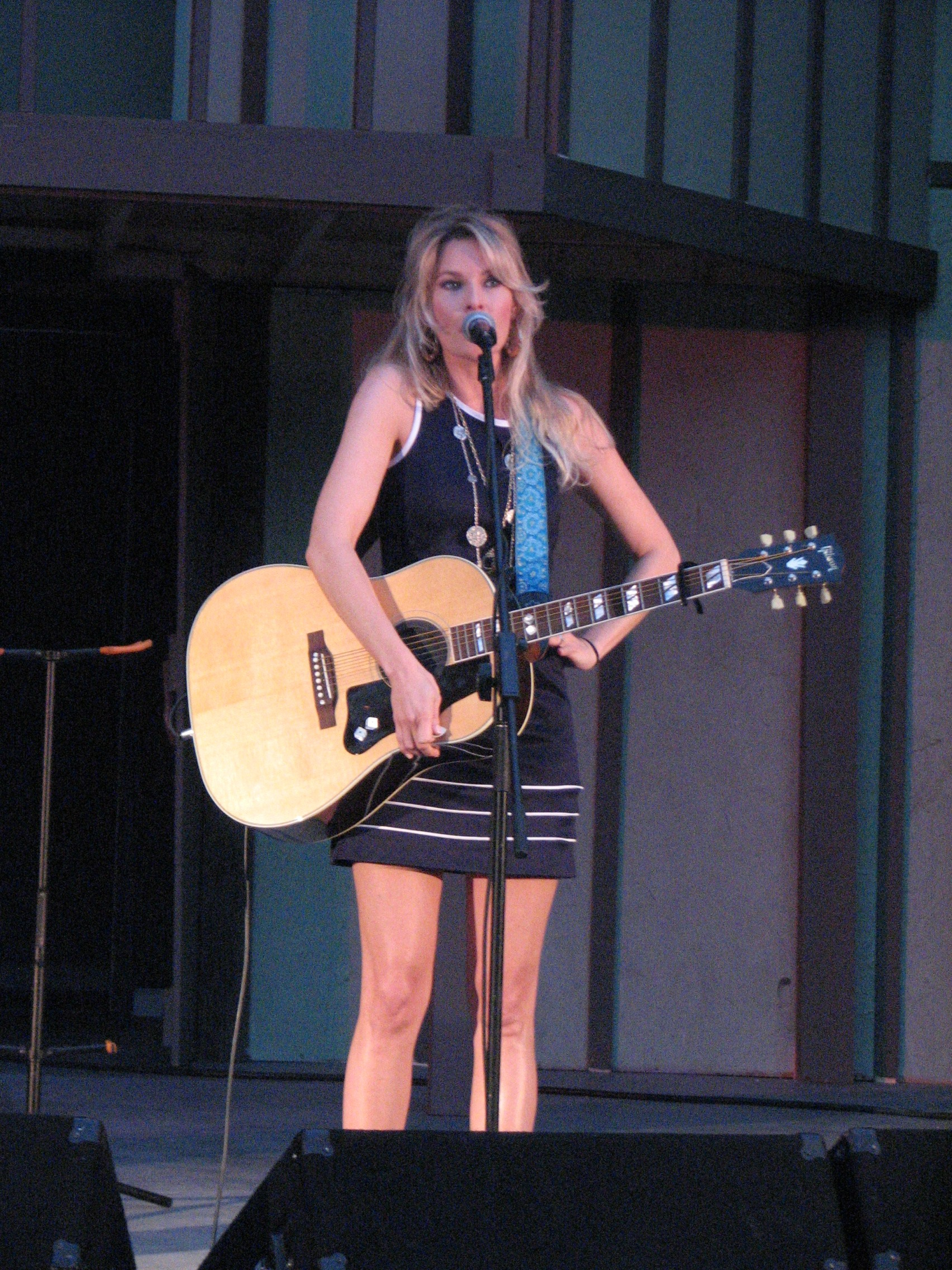
After the album's release, Cook (pictured in 2009) left Warner Bros. and became an independent artist.

Because of "constant restructuring at the label", Hey Y'all was not heavily promoted. The album was commercially unsuccessful, and was not played on country radio. In a headline for The Tennessean, Peter Cooper described Cook as the "darling of critics, not radio". In 2003, Cook's manager Bill Mayne said she had asked to leave Warner Bros. to look for other options, and believed the split was amicable. Prior to Cook's departure, the label's executives believed she had gotten enough "substantial media exposure" to support a second album. According to a CMT writer, Cook's publishing and recording contracts were dissolved after she left the label.

In a 2011 interview with the Chicago Tribune, Cook said Warner Bros. pushed her to record songs that followed radio trends; she explained that she refused to write music for the sole purpose of becoming the next "summertime feel-good hit", and joked: "I would rather mow my lawn." While talking to The Standard-Journal in 2008, Cook described her experiences working with a major record label:

There's an infinite amount of resources which (major labels) will spend very foolishly, and that has, in many ways, stalled and become ineffective for growing a lot of artists. It still can work as a good launching pad, and this is just my experience, but they didn't really encourage certain things that worked for me.

After leaving Warner Bros., Cook went on to release independent music. In a 2005 Country Standard Time article, Rick Bell believed her experiences with the record label had given her a "sense of betrayal and bitterness", which she explored on This Side of the Moon. He said these emotions are most prominently featured on the tracks "Here's to You" and "Hard-Hearted".

== Track listing ==
Credits adapted from the liner notes of Hey Y'all: (Note: The featured artists are not named in the track listing.) (Note: All of the songs were produced by Richard Dodd.)

Hey Y'all track listing
No.	Title	Writer(s)	Length
1.	"Stupid Things"	Elizabeth Cook; Hardie McGehee	2:24
2.	"Rainbows at Midnight"	Cook; McGehee	3:11
3.	"Mama You Wanted to Be a Singer Too"	Cook	3:16
4.	"Dolly"	Cook	3:03
5.	"I'm Not Lisa"	Jessi Colter	4:51
6.	"Everyday Sunshine"	Cook; McGehee	3:36
7.	"You Move Too Fast"	Cook; McGehee	4:11
8.	"Demon"	Cook	2:25
9.	"Blue Shades"	Cook; McGehee	3:28
10.	"Don't Bother Me"	Cook; McGehee	3:25
11.	"God's Got a Plan"	Cook; Tim Carroll	4:24
12.	"Ocala"	Cook; McGehee	4:23
Total length:			42:37

== Credits and personnel ==
The following credits were adapted from the booklet of Hey Y'all and AllMusic:

=== Musicians ===
- Elizabeth Cook – lead vocals, backing vocals, handclaps (11)
- Ronnie Brown – keyboards
- Tony Harrell – keyboards
- Kevin McKendree – keyboards
- Gary Burnette – electric guitars
- Tim Carroll – electric guitars, backing vocals, handclaps (11)
- J.T. Corenflos – electric guitars
- Dan Dugmore – acoustic guitars, electric guitars, banjo, dobro, steel guitar, EBow (12)
- Glen Duncan – acoustic guitars, mandolin
- Dave Francis – acoustic guitars
- Jeff Gordon – acoustic guitars
- Pat Sansone – acoustic guitars, bass, percussion
- Darrell Scott – acoustic guitars, dobro, mandolin, bass, backing vocals
- Steve Sheehan – acoustic guitars
- Kenny Vaughan – acoustic guitars, electric guitars, bass
- Dennis Belfield – bass
- Mark Hill – bass
- Viktor Krauss – bass
- Kenny Malone – drums
- Greg Morrow – drums, percussion
- Rick Schell – drums
- Sam Bacco – percussion
- John Catchings – strings, string arrangements
- David Davidson – strings, string arrangements
- Richard Dodd – string arrangements
- Mike Allen – backing vocals
- Norah Lee Allen – backing vocals
- Carol Lee Cooper – backing vocals
- Dennis McCall – backing vocals
- Bill Anderson – backing vocals (10)
- The Whites – backing vocals (11)

=== Production ===
- Richard Dodd – producer, engineer, digital editing, mixing (3, 4, 12)
- Dan Leffler – engineer, digital editing, mix assistant (3, 4, 12)
- Mike Bradley – mixing (1, 2, 5–11)
- James Bauer – second engineer
- Drew Bollman – second engineer
- Robert Charles – second engineer
- Mark Capps – mix assistant (1, 2, 5–11)
- Richie Biggs – digital editing
- Jeff Gordon – production coordinator
- Michael Wilson – photography
- Garrett Rittenberry – design
- Mayne Entertainment – management
