= Love Is All We Need (disambiguation) =

"Love Is All We Need" is a 1997 song by Mary J. Blige.

Love Is All We Need may also refer to:

- "Love Is All We Need", a 1958 song by Tommy Edwards
- "Love Is All We Need", a 2003 song by Celine Dion from One Heart

== See also ==
- Love Is All You Need (disambiguation)
- All You Need Is Love (disambiguation)
