= Elizabeth Cook =

American country singer (born 1972)

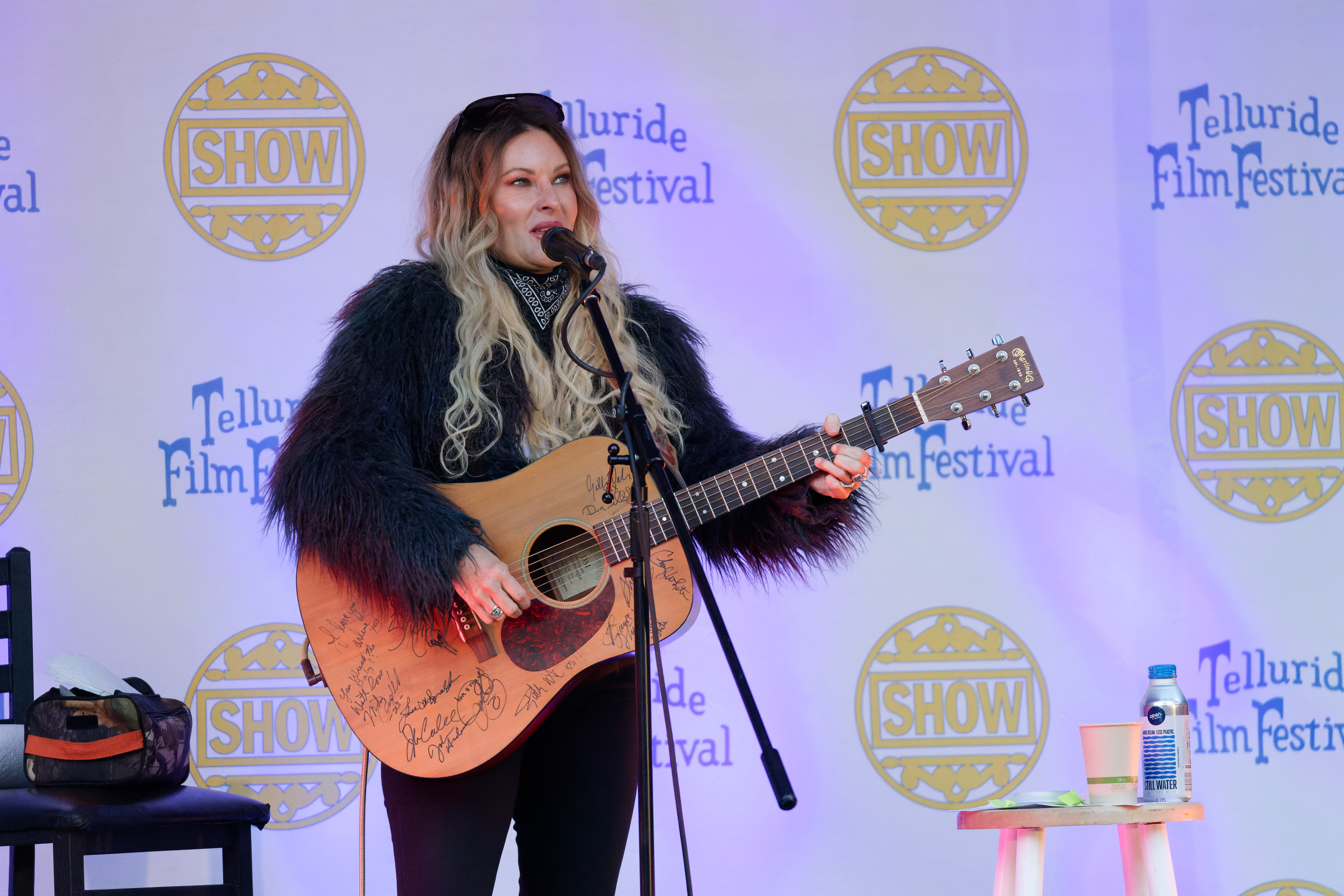
- Cook in 2024

Background information
- Born: July 18, 1972 (age 54); Wildwood, Florida, U.S.
- Genres: Country, Americana, honky-tonk
- Occupations: Singer-songwriter, radio host
- Instruments: Vocals, guitar
- Years active: 2000–present
- Labels: Warner Bros., Hog County, 31 Tigers, Thirty Tigers
- Website: elizabeth-cook.com

Elizabeth Cook (born July 18, 1972) is an American country singer from Florida. She has made over 400 appearances on the Grand Ole Opry since her debut on March 17, 2000, despite not being a member. Cook, "the daughter of a hillbilly singer married to a moonshiner who played his upright bass while in a prison band", was "virtually unknown to the pop masses" before she made a debut appearance on the Late Show with David Letterman in June 2012. The New York Times called her "a sharp and surprising country singer" and an "idiosyncratic traditionalist".

== Early life ==
The youngest of 12 children, Cook was born in Wildwood, Florida. Her mother, Joyce, played mandolin and guitar and performed on radio and local television. Her father, Thomas, also played string instruments. He honed his skills playing upright bass in the Atlanta Federal Penitentiary prison band while serving time for running moonshine. In prison he learned welding; Cook would name her 2010 album Welder. After his release from prison, he and Joyce began playing together in local country bands. Elizabeth was onstage with them when she was four, singing material like songwriter John Schweers' "Daydreams About Night Things", a 1975 hit for Ronnie Milsap. She formed a band when she was nine years old.

Cook graduated from Georgia Southern University in 1996 with dual degrees in Accounting and Computer Information Systems.

== Career ==
Cook moved to Nashville, Tennessee in 1996 to work for PricewaterhouseCoopers. She got a publishing deal and ended up sleeping on the floor of the publishing house for three years while she worked on honing her craft, with The Blue Album, which contained demo recordings she had made in Nashville, finally being released in 2000. She cut her major-label debut, 2002's Hey Y'all, for Warner Bros. Records. Hey Y'all was not a commercial success. After taking a shot at co-writing, Cook asked to be released from her contract. A proposed deal with Sony Records subsequently fell through.

She released 2004's This Side of the Moon, which was eventually picked up by record label Thirty Tigers. It received positive reviews from The New York Times and No Depression. Produced by Rodney Crowell, Balls, which included a song Cook had written with songwriter Melinda Schneider, "Sometimes It Takes Balls to Be a Woman", was released in May 2007. Welder featured appearances by Dwight Yoakam, Crowell and Buddy Miller.

Cook toured in the United States, as well as in South Korea, Japan, Norway, Sweden, Poland, France and the UK. She appeared at the Cambridge Folk Festival, the Maverick Festival and the Borderline in London. She has continued to play the Grand Ole Opry, making over 400 appearances—the most by a non-member of the radio show.

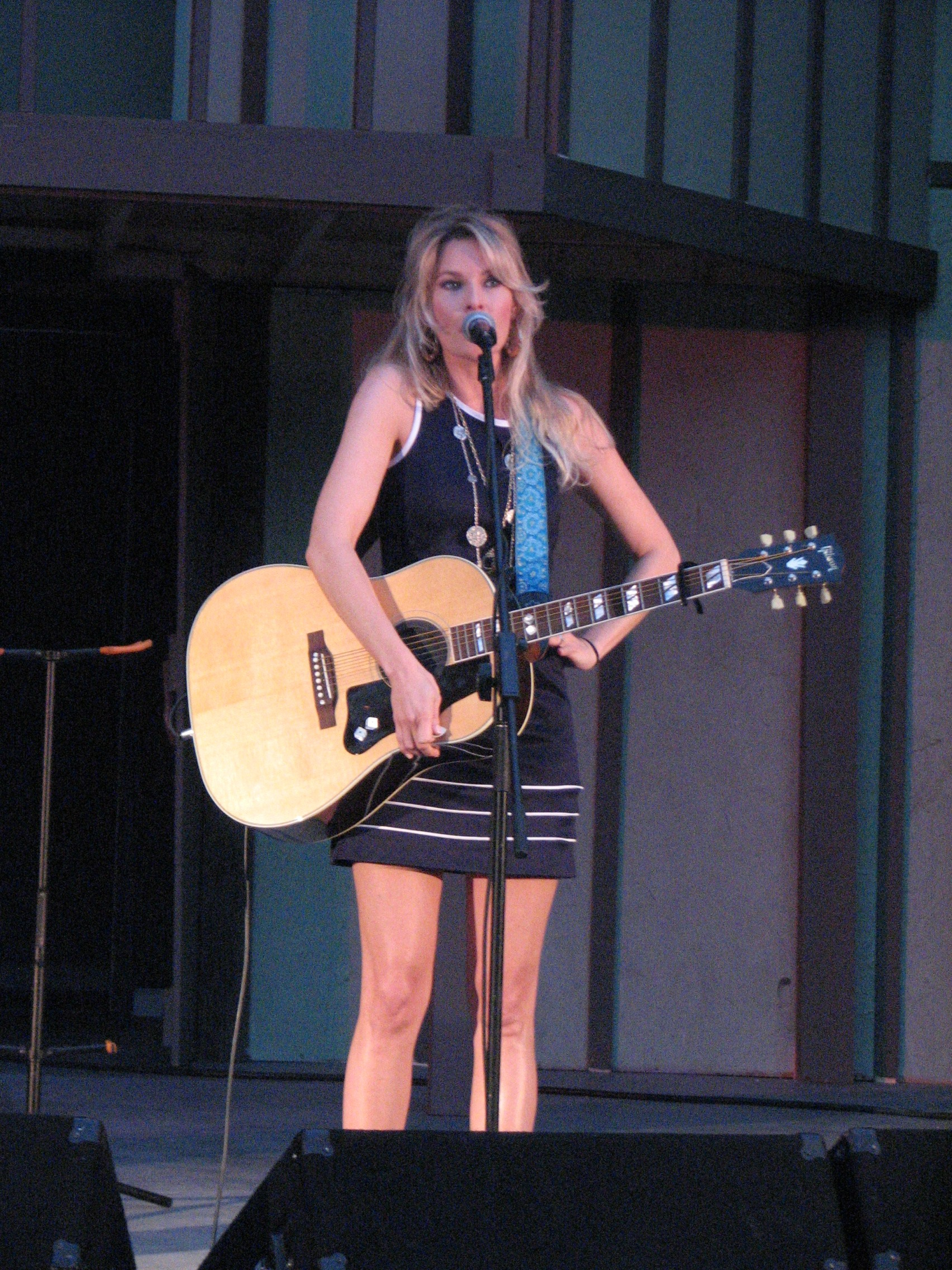
Cook performing in 2009

She toured the UK in support of Welder, performing 18 dates with her then-husband, guitarist and songwriter Tim Carroll, and her upright bass player Bones Hillman, formerly of Midnight Oil.

Cook was invited by the Atlanta Braves to sing the national anthem before their 2011 home opener on April 8, 2011.

At the suggestion of Paul Shaffer, Cook was invited in August 22 2011 to be a guest on Late Show with David Letterman, where she discussed satellite radio and growing up in Florida. She considered starring in a CBS sitcom about a single mother whose life is disrupted by the arrival of her criminal father, but the show never came to fruition. In June 2012 Cook returned to the Late Show to perform with Jason Isbell. They sang covers of Townes Van Zandt's "Pancho and Lefty" and "Tecumseh Valley". On March 14, 2013, she appeared a third time on the Late Show with David Letterman and was interviewed by Letterman. She worked extensively with Carlene Carter on Carter's tenth studio album, Carter Girl. On June 2, 2014, she appeared a fourth time on Late Show with David Letterman, performing Lou Reed's "Pale Blue Eyes".

In June 17, 2016, Cook released her sixth studio album, Exodus of Venus.

In 2020, Cook began hosting Upstream with Elizabeth Cook, a fishing show on the Circle network.

On September 11, 2020, she released the album Aftermath.

She can also be heard on select episodes of the Adult Swim series Squidbillies, where she voices Tammi.

Cook hosts the mid-day radio show "Elizabeth Cook's Apron Strings" on the Sirius XM radio station Outlaw Country. She has been nominated for two Ameripolitan Music Awards for her radio work, including 2011, and she won their Outlaw Female award in 2014.

== Personal life ==
After Welder was released in 2010, she and Carroll divorced. In addition, her father, mother, brother, mother-in-law and brother-in-law died during this period. She cancelled an upcoming tour and entered rehab. Inteviewed in 2016, Cook later said, "I needed some help. I did not feel like rehab was what I needed and I tried to desperately convince some key people around me that in that moment I needed intensive therapy and I probably needed medication. They cancelled the tour and said you can't go because we don't trust the state that you're in. You're saying you're not addicted to anything and you're saying you don't have an eating disorder but we don't know that." She was critical of the treatment she received during rehab.

== Discography ==
=== Studio albums ===
Title	Album details	Peak chart positions		Sales
Title	Album details	US Country	US Heat	Sales
The Blue Album	Release date: November 20, 2000; Label: Self-released	—	—	
Hey Y'all	Release date: August 27, 2002; Label: Warner Bros. Nashville	—	—	
This Side of the Moon	Release date: August 16, 2004; Label: Hog Country	—	—	
Balls	Release date: May 1, 2007; Label: 31 Tigers	72	—	
Welder	Release date: May 11, 2010; Label: 31 Tigers	43	23	
Exodus of Venus	Release date: June 17, 2016; Label: Agent Love	23	7	US: 3,700
Aftermath	Release date: September 11, 2020; Label: Agent Love	—	—	
Great Television	Release date: August 14, 2026; Label: Thirty Tigers	—	—	
"—" denotes releases that did not chart

=== Extended plays ===
Title	EP details
Gospel Plow	Release date: June 12, 2012; Label: 31 Tigers

=== Singles ===
Year	Single	Album
2002	"Stupid Things"	Hey Y'all
2007	"Sometimes It Takes Balls to Be a Woman"	Balls
2008	"Sunday Morning"	Balls
2010	"All the Time"	Welder
2012	"Leather & Lace" (with Aaron Watson)	Hearts Across Texas

=== Music videos ===
Year	Video	Director
2002	"Stupid Things"	Chris Rogers
2005	"Before I Go That Far"	
2007	"Sometimes It Takes Balls to Be a Woman"	Roger Pistole
2008	"Sunday Morning"	George Nicholas
2010	"All the Time"	Kristin Barlowe
2012	"Rock n Roll Man"	Stacie Huckabee
2020	"Perfect Girls of Pop"	Curtis Wayne Milliard
2020	"Bones"	James Southard
2020	"Bad Decisions"	Jeff Adamczyk
2020	"Thick Georgia Woman"	Alan Steadman
2020	"Two Chords and a Lie"	Curtis Wayne Millard

=== Guest appearances ===
Year	Song	Artist	Album	Notes
2007	"The Great Atomic Power" (with The Grascals)	Various	Song of America	Compilation album
2012	"Leather and Lace" (with Aaron Watson)	Various	Hearts Across Texas	Compilation album
2013	"Feels So Right" (with Todd Snider)	Various	High Cotton: A Tribute to Alabama	Compilation album
2014	"Blackie's Gunman"	Carlene Carter	Carter Girl	Also backing vocals on tracks 1, 5, 6 and 10
2015	"I Had Someone Else Before I Had You"	Asleep at the Wheel	Still the King: Celebrating the Music of Bob Wills and His Texas Playboys	
2016	"From Here to the Blues"	Doug Seegers	Walking on the Edge of the World	
2016	"If Teardrops Were Pennies"	Buddy Miller	Cayamo Sessions at Sea	Live album
2022	"Everybody Wants to Rule the World"	Various	3Sirens Presents: With Love Part 2	Compilation album
2025	"Songbird"	Waylon Jennings	Songbird	Studio album

== Awards and nomination ==
Year	Association	Category	Nominated work	Result
2007	Americana Music Awards	Song of the Year	Sometimes, It Takes Balls to Be a Woman	Nominated
2011	Americana Music Awards	Album of the Year	Welder	Nominated
2011	Americana Music Awards	Song of the Year	El Camino	Nominated
2011	Americana Music Awards	Artist of the Year	Elizabeth Cook	Nominated
2014	Ameripolitan Music Awards	Outlaw Female	Elizabeth Cook	Won
2015	Ameripolitan Music Awards	DJ	Elizabeth Cook - Sirius XM Outlaw	Nominated
2016	Ameripolitan Music Awards	DJ	Elizabeth Cook - Sirius XM Outlaw	Nominated

== Live radio appearances ==
- Bob Harris Country, BBC Radio 2, July 8, 2010. Cook performed 3 songs live: "All The Time", "El Camino", "My Heroin Addict Sister".
- The Back Road Radio Show, Indianapolis, IN 91.9FM WITT, Cook did a live interview
