= All You Need Is Love (disambiguation) =

"All You Need Is Love" is a 1967 song by the Beatles.

All You Need Is Love may also refer to:

== Music ==
- All You Need Is Love (album), an album by Die Apokalyptischen Reiter
- All You Need Is Love (EP), an EP by Nat Sakdatorn
- "All You Need Is Love" (JAMs song)
- "All You Need Is Love", a song by Avicii from his 2013 album True
- "All You Need Is Love", a theme song from the anime Magic Knight Rayearth
- "All You Need Is Love", a track from the 2015 album Fake Metal Jacket by idol group BiSH

== Film and television ==
- All You Need Is Love: The Story of Popular Music, a 1976-1980 television documentary series, with a companion book of the same name
- All You Need Is Love: Meine Schwiegertochter ist ein Mann, a 2009 German television film
- All You Need Is Love (2015 film), a 2015 Hong Kong film
- All U Need Is Love, a 2021 film
- "All You Need Is Love" (Grey's Anatomy), a television episode
- "All You Need Is Love" (Night Court), a television episode

== See also ==
- All You Need Is Luv', an album by Luv'
- All We Need Is Love (disambiguation)
- Love Is All You Need (disambiguation)
