= This Side of the Moon =

2004 album by Elizabeth Cook

Studio album by Elizabeth Cook
- Released: August 2004
- Studio: Bel Air Studios, County Q, The Hum Depot, Nightingale Studios, Station West and Sound Emporium Studios (Nashville, Tennessee); The Sound Kitchen (Franklin, Tennessee); Scruggs Sound Studio (Berry Hill, Tennessee)
- Genre: Country
- Length: 38:53
- Label: Hog Country Production
- Producer: Jeff Gordon; Randy Scruggs; Jerry Salley; Steve Fishell; Stephony Smith

Elizabeth Cook chronology
Hey Y'all (2002)	This Side of the Moon (2004)	Balls (2007)

This Side of the Moon is the third studio album by American singer Elizabeth Cook, released on May 17, 2005, by Hog Country Production. Cook based the album on her experience with Warner Bros. Records, which had released her second studio album, Hey Y'all, in 2002. Initially signed to AOL-Time Warner, she was transferred to Warner Bros. and experienced problems with the label, including an album delay. Hey Y'all was commercially unsuccessful and was not heavily promoted; its songs were not played on country radio. Cook voluntarily left Warner Bros. in 2003, and used her disappointment working in Nashville's Music Row as inspiration for her follow-up album.

A country album, This Side of the Moon features lyrics about love and heartbreak. Before being packaged as an album, the songs were recorded independently, with the assistance of five producers in eight Tennessee recording studios. Most of the songs were written by Cook and songwriter Hardie McGehee, both of whom worked for music publisher Sis 'N Bro Music. Critics likened Cook's vocals to those of country artists such as Loretta Lynn and Dolly Parton.

This Side of the Moon had a limited release in August 2004 before becoming more widely available the following year. Cook promoted it with live performances at the Grand Ole Opry and international music festivals. The album received little airplay, and after its release, Cook worked as a waitress to secure steady pay. Critical response at the time was generally positive and, in retrospective articles, reviewers felt This Side of the Moon helped enhance Cook's musical career.

== Background and recording ==
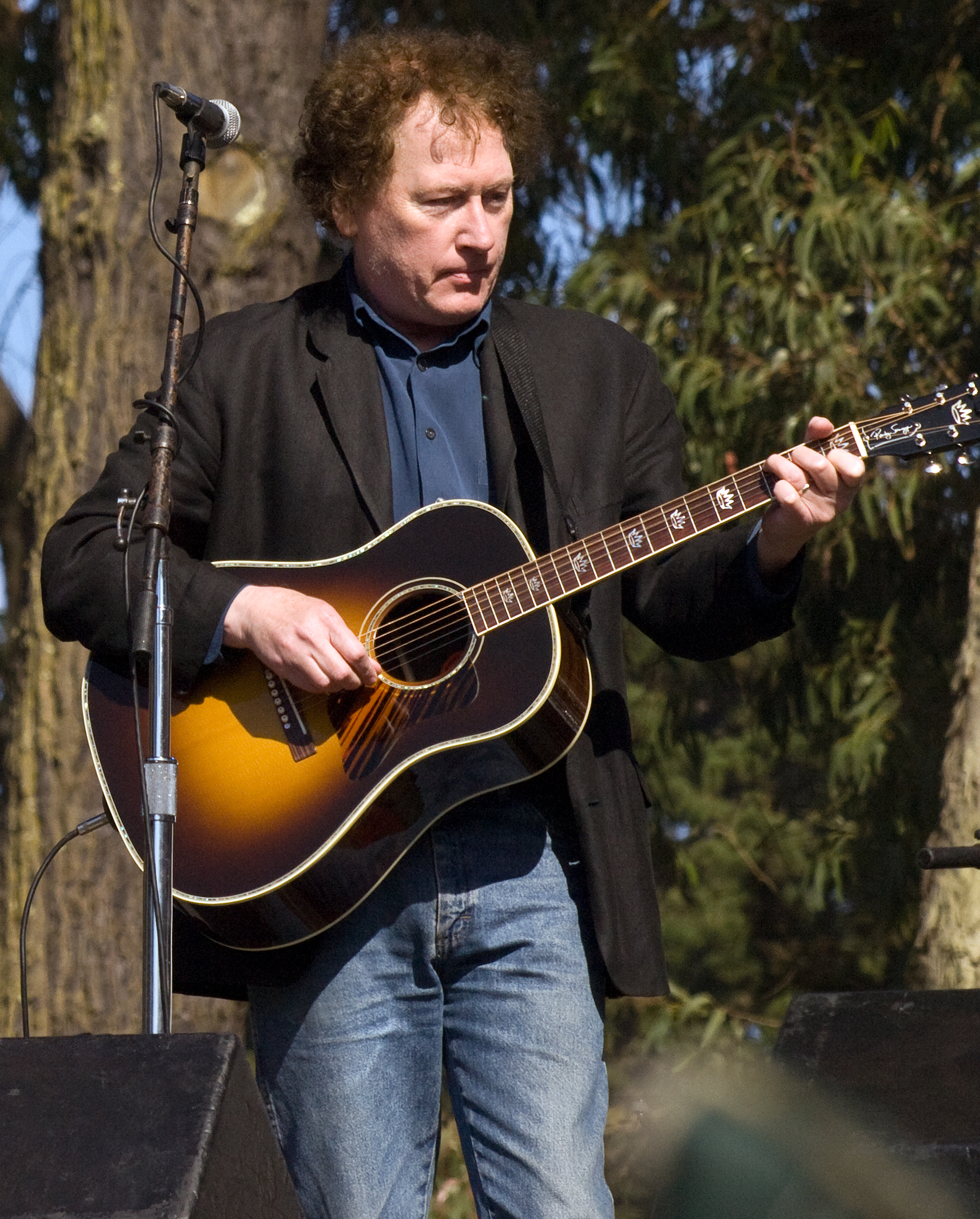
Elizabeth Cook collaborated with eight producers, including Randy Scruggs (pictured in 2009), on "song experiments" which were later grouped together on This Side of the Moon.

Elizabeth Cook signed a recording contract with Atlantic Records after receiving positive reviews for The Blue Album, her 2000 self-released debut studio album. The recording sessions for her second studio album Hey Y'all began in the spring of 2001, but its release would be delayed to 2002 because of record label issues. When AOL-Time Warner – which owned Atlantic – closed its Nashville office, the company transferred Cook's contract to its parent company Warner Bros. Hey Y'all was commercially unsuccessful, and its songs did not receive airplay on country radio. In a 2005 Country Standard Time article, Rick Bell attributed this to Cook receiving "little label support". Cook left Warner Bros. voluntarily to look for another record label in 2003.

According to Cook's website, This Side of the Moon was constructed from separate "song experiments". No Depression's Grant Alden described the album as a "collection of demos she scraped together" following her Warner Bros. contract. "Funny Side of Love" was one of the first tracks recorded in this process. Five producers, including Randy Scruggs and Sugar Hill's A&R director Steve Fishell, handled the songs which were recorded at eight recording studios throughout Tennessee. Jeff Gordon was the executive producer for This Side of the Moon; along with producing a majority of the album, he mastered all of its songs. Cook had met Gordon when he was looking for a "traditional girl country singer" to re-record his demos.

This Side of the Moon was inspired by Cook's departure from Warner Bros., which she described as her "divorce from Music Row" and a "period of extreme frustration". In 2005, Cook told the Country Standard Time that she preferred being an independent artist, saying: "This is much more grass-roots, more real to me." Cook has writing credits on the album's thirteen songs; she co-wrote seven of them with songwriter Hardie McGehee, who she worked with because they were signed to the same music publisher (Sis 'N Bro Music). Cook and McGehee had collaborated on seven songs for Hey Y'all.

Following the release of This Side of the Moon, McGehee moved to Birmingham, Alabama, and Cook shifted to writing music by herself. She believed they had "reached a real good stride" with the album, saying: "And I'm not sure where we would go from there." Cook wrote two songs, "Ruthless" and "Heather Are You With Me Tonight", by herself and worked with her then-husband Tim Carroll on "Where the Blue Begins", which they recorded as a duet.

== Composition and lyrics ==
=== Sound ===
This Side of the Moon is a thirteen-track country album, which Rick Bell further defined as "hard-edged country". Kelefa Sanneh, while writing for The New York Times, described the album as "old-fashioned" and likened its simple arrangements to demos. A contributor for The Tennessean noted that Cook often used retro influences in her music. In The Tampa Tribune, Stephen Thompson remarked that the songs had different styles, ranging from a "slow ballad" to a "rollicking mid-tempo number".

Critics compared Cook's vocals to those of Dolly Parton and Loretta Lynn. Alden described Cook's voice as "high [and] clear", saying it was "reminiscent in its quiet moments of Dolly Parton, or of a more burnished Julie Miller". The Philadelphia Inquirer's Nick Cristiano interpreted Cook's vocals as having an "industrial-strength vocal twang" and "Loretta Lynn spunkiness", citing "Cupid", "All We Need Is Love", and "Somebody's Gotta Do It" as examples of this. Although Thompson noted that Cook lacked a "knockout voice" like Patsy Cline, Kelly Willis and Iris DeMent, he wrote that she had a "sincere, unfussy style of singing". While describing Cook's voice as "high" and "agile", Sanneh remarked that unlike other singers' approaches to ballads, Cook "chuckles where others might sob".

=== Lyrics ===
Throughout This Side of the Moon, Cook sings about her experiences with Warner Bros. In "Funny Side of Love", she uses humor to process her feelings of "disappointment and sense of lost opportunity" after leaving the label. Cook said that while "Here's to You" and "Hard-Hearted" sound like break-up songs, the lyrics are about her career. The album also focuses on love and heartbreak. Cook warns her partner in the ballad "Before I Go That Far" about what will happen if they break up. In "This Side of the Moon", she sings about the hard work required in a relationship, specifically how it involves "going through struggles and becoming disenchanted with what you started working towards in the first place". The album's final track "Somebody's Gotta Do It" is about satisfying a woman's needs.

"Heather Are You With Me Tonight" is a love song about a soldier's loneliness and thoughts of his girlfriend. The lyrics focus on his moral struggle over carrying out an airstrike and his hope that his girlfriend will understand him and remain faithful. Cook wrote the song during the bombing of Baghdad in the 2003 invasion of Iraq. Alden viewed it as a war song rather than a protest song, and author Alice Randall and songwriters Carter and Courtney Little compared its message to Glen Campbell's 1969 single "Galveston", saying they both ask a similar moral question: "Can war and love exist in the same heart?"

== Release and promotion ==
This Side of the Moon had a limited release in August 2004. (Note: In a June 2004 article, The Tennessean's Peter Cooper said the album was already available.) Media outlets described the release as independent. Hog Country Production gave This Side of the Moon a larger release on May 17, 2005 as an audio CD.

Before the album's release, Cook had performed its music as part of her live shows. According to a 2005 press release, Cook planned to embark on a summer tour and perform at the Grand Ole Opry to further support This Side of the Moon. Cook also promoted it by performing at international music festivals. The album was later released on streaming services.

In 2005, Cook recorded a music video for "Before I Go That Far" in New Mexico. Entertainment company Thirty Tigers uploaded the video to its YouTube channel on April 10, 2007. According to the company's YouTube channel, This Side of the Moon was later licensed to the Orchard Music on behalf of Hog Country Production.

This Side of the Moon's tracks received little airplay, and following the album's release, Cook worked as a waitress to secure a steady income. She recounted taking that job because she was not emotionally attached to it, and she felt comfortable quitting to perform at live shows. In a 2007 CMT interview, Cook said she developed a fanbase from "a small handful of cult country music fans" that she thought were frustrated with her lack of commercial success; she also mentioned reaching a sense of peace about her experiences with different record deals.

== Critical reception ==
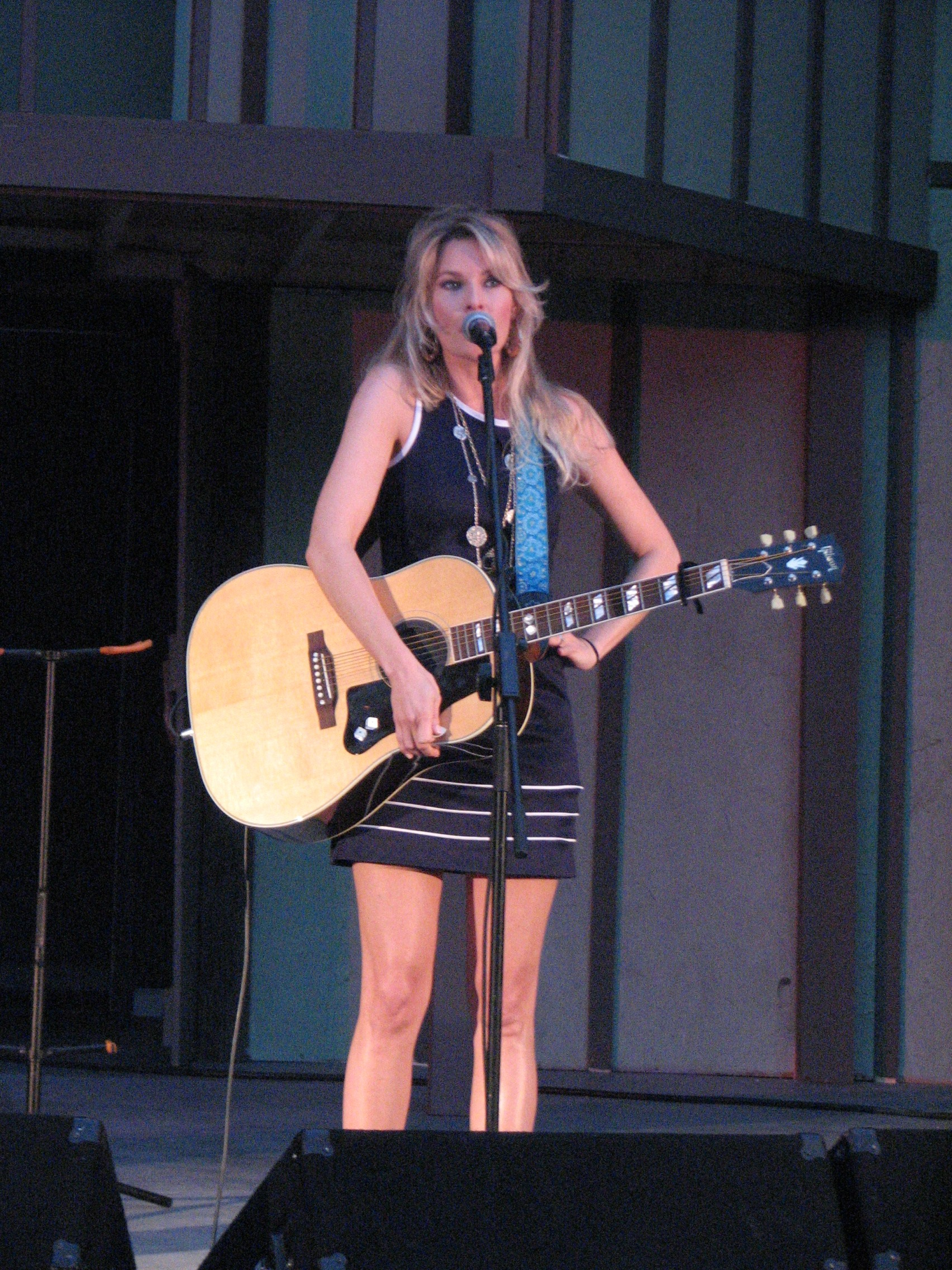
Critics later believed This Side of the Moon helped Elizabeth Cook (pictured in 2009) with her career.

This Side of the Moon was met with generally positive reviews from critics. Sanneh included it on his list of 2005's best obscurities, and in an August 2005 article, Thompson named it the best country album by a female artist so far that year. Several reviewers commended the album for its traditional country sound, such as Bell who described it as "a brilliant 13-song collection of hard-edged country sung with steely conviction". Cook's songwriting was also highlighted. Praising the album's cohesion as well as Cook's vocals and songwriting, Alden identified her as "an artist to whom attention must be paid". Describing This Side of the Moon as an improvement over Hey Y'all, Cristiano appreciated how "disappointment obviously didn't dull her artistry". Bell believed she deserved "a hard-earned, well-deserved second chance" to work with another major record label.

Cristiano said Cook proved herself to be a "thoughtful and deeply affecting balladeer", pointing out "Before I Go That Far" as an example. In 2006, Randall, Carter, and Little also singled out the track when praising Cook for creating "lush harmonies, traditional arrangements, and simple production". While dismissing the notion that Cook was a guilty pleasure, Cooper praised "Here's to You", "Where the Blue Begins", and "Somebody's Gotta Do It" as "music fit for smiling, humming and other admirable pursuits". Alden highlighted "Heather Are You with Me Tonight" as "the first great song" from the Iraq War years, and said it was his favorite song six years after the album's release.

Retrospective reviews of This Side of the Moon remained positive. In a 2006 article, a contributor for The Tennessean described it as Cook's best album. Two years later, an NPR writer said Cook had achieved "some commercial and artistic potential" with the album. Critics identified the album as an important part of Cook's career, such as Louisville's Brent Owen who believed it gave her further exposure in the music industry. A staff writer for the River Cities' Reader attributed This Side of the Moon and Balls to helping establish Cook as a "soulful country singer and impassioned songwriter".

== Track listing ==
Credits adapted from the liner notes of This Side of the Moon:

This Side of the Moon track listing
No.	Title	Writer(s)	Producer(s)	Length
1.	"Cupid"	Randy Scruggs; Elizabeth Cook	Scruggs	2:50
2.	"Funny Side of Love"	Cook; McGehee	Steve Marcantonio	2:05
3.	"Before I Go That Far"	Cook; Jim McBride; Jerry Salley	Salley	3:20
4.	"Here's to You"	Cook; McGehee	Jeff Gordon	2:57
5.	"This Side of the Moon"	Cook; McGehee	Gordon	3:50
6.	"Kiss Me Again"	Cook; McGehee	Gordon	2:54
7.	"Ruthless"	Cook	Gordon	2:48
8.	"Alone Down Here"	Cook; Stephony Smith	Smith	3:21
9.	"Hard-Hearted"	Cook; McGehee	Gordon	3:44
10.	"Heather Are You with Me Tonight"	Cook	Gordon	2:29
11.	"All We Need Is Love"	Cook; McGehee	Steve Fishell	2:44
12.	"Where the Blue Begins"	Cook; Tim Carroll	Gordon	2:39
13.	"Somebody's Gotta Do It"	Cook; McGehee	Gordon	2:59
Total length:				38:53

== Personnel ==
The following credits are adapted from the booklet of This Side of the Moon and AllMusic:

=== Musicians ===
- Elizabeth Cook – vocals, backing vocals (1, 3–5, 8, 10–13), acoustic guitars (10)
- Gary Smith – keyboards (3)
- Ronnie Brown – keyboards (4, 5, 12, 13), organ (10)
- Tony Harrell – keyboards (6, 9)
- Howard Duck – keyboards (8)
- Fats Kaplin – accordion (12), fiddle (12)
- Steve Gibson – electric guitars (1)
- Randy Scruggs – acoustic guitars (1)
- Jimmy Capps – acoustic guitars (2, 6, 7, 9)
- Kenny Vaughan – electric guitars (2, 6, 7, 9, 11, 12)
- Michael Severs – electric guitars (3)
- Wanda Vick – acoustic guitars (3), fiddle (3)
- Tim Carroll – electric guitars (4, 5, 10, 13), backing vocals (9)
- Dave Francis – acoustic guitars (4, 5, 11–13), bass (12)
- Mike Henderson – electric guitars (4, 5, 13)
- James Hardie McGehee – acoustic guitars (4, 5, 11, 13), backing vocals (4, 5, 11, 13), keyboards (5)
- Tom Bukovac – electric guitars (8)
- Billy Panda – acoustic guitars (8), mandolin (8)
- Richard Bennett – electric guitars (11)
- Dan Dugmore – steel guitar (1, 2, 6, 7, 9)
- Mike Johnson – steel guitar (3)
- Al Perkins – steel guitar (4, 5, 13)
- Steve Fishell – steel guitar (11)
- Tammy Rogers – mandolin (7), fiddle (9)
- Alison Prestwood – bass (1, 2, 6, 7, 9)
- Kevin Grantt – bass (3)
- Spencer Campbell – bass (4, 5, 13)
- Duncan Mullins – bass (8)
- Paul Slivka – bass (10)
- Dave Jacques – bass (11)
- Shannon Forrest – drums (1)
- Greg Morrow – drums (2, 6, 7, 9)
- Paul Scholten – drums (3)
- John Gardner – drums (4, 5, 13)
- Owen Hale – drums (8)
- Butch Simmons – drums (10)
- Paul Deacon – drums (11)
- Rick Schell – drums (12)
- Glen Duncan – fiddle (1)
- Sean Locke – backing vocals (2)
- Jerry Salley – backing vocals (3)
- Stephony Smith – backing vocals (8)

=== Production ===
- Jeff Gordon – executive producer, mastering, producer (2, 4–7, 9, 10, 12, 13), mixing (2, 10), recording (10)
- Randy Scruggs – producer (1)
- Jerry Salley – producer (3)
- Stephony Smith – producer (8)
- Steve Fishell – producer (11)
- Ron Reynolds – recording (1), mixing (1)
- Steve Marcantonio – recording (2, 6–9), mixing (8)
- Ronnie Brown – mixing (2, 10)
- T.W. Cargile – recording (3), mixing (3)
- Rusty McFarland – recording (4, 5, 13)
- Jim McKell – mixing (4, 5)
- Mills Logan – mixing (6, 7, 9, 13)
- Mike Poole – recording (11), mixing (11)
- Joe Bogan – recording (12), mixing (12)
- Heather Dryden – art direction, design
- Raye Dene Berry – photography
- Suzy Kipp – stylist
- Chelle Rose – hair, make-up
- Flood, Bumstead, McCready & McCarthy – management

== Notes and references ==
=== Sources ===
- Alden, Grant (November 1, 2004). "Elizabeth Cook – This Side Of The Moon". No Depression. Archived from the original on August 28, 2020.
- Alden, Grant (May 23, 2010). "An appreciation of Elizabeth Cook, and her album Welder". No Depression. Archived from the original on August 28, 2020.
- "August 5". All the Rage. The Tennessean. June 8, 2006. p. 21 – via Newspapers.com.
- Bell, Rick (2005). "Elizabeth Cook: This Side of the Moon". Country Standard Time. Archived from the original on July 2, 2020.
- Bell, Rick (June 2005). "Elizabeth Cook lands on this side of the moon". Country Standard Time. Archived from the original on December 13, 2010.
- Brodginski, Todd; Nelson, Lathum (March 31, 2005). "Country Singer/Songwriter Elizabeth Cook to Release This Side of the Moon May 17 on Emergent/Hog County Records" (Press release). Mitch Schneider Organization. Archived from the original on August 28, 2020.
- Cooper, Peter (December 29, 2002). "Elizabeth Cook: Darling of critics, not radio". Life. The Tennessean. p. 11 – via Newspapers.com.
- Cooper, Peter (June 1, 2004). "Hey, y'all!: Cook does the Wash". Entertainment. The Tennessean. p. D3 – via Newspapers.com.
- Cooper, Peter (June 25, 2004). "Hot Country in the Plaza". Weekend. The Tennessean. p. 3F – via Newspapers.com.
- Cooper, Peter (June 9, 2005). "An 'Opry' Darling". Entertainment. The Tennessean. p. 3D – via Newspapers.com.
- Cristiano, Nick (May 29, 2005). "Elizabeth Cook: This Side of the Moon". Arts & Entertainment. The Philadelphia Inquirer. p. H9 – via Newspapers.com.
- "Credits". AllMusic. Archived from the original on July 2, 2020.
- "Elizabeth Cook: 'Before I Go That Far' Music Video". Thirty Tiger. April 10, 2007. Archived from the original on September 24, 2020 – via YouTube.
- "Elizabeth Cook Explores Music Roots in New Book, Right By Her Roots". CMT. March 21, 2011. Archived from the original on July 11, 2017.
- "Elizabeth Cook, May 23". River Cities' Reader. May 9, 2018. Archived from the original on August 28, 2020.
- "Elizabeth Cook On Mountain Stage". NPR. September 3, 2008. Archived from the original on August 28, 2020.
- Goodman, Frank (July 2005). "A Conversation with Elizabeth Cook" (PDF). Puremusic.com. Archived (PDF) from the original on September 9, 2016.
- Hage, Erik. "Artist Biography by Erik Hage". AllMusic. Archived from the original on September 10, 2016.
- Hey Y'all (Inlay cover). Elizabeth Cook. Warner Bros. August 27, 2002.
- Owen, Brent (June 3, 2015). "Zanzabar Welcomes Elizabeth Cook". Louisville. Archived from the original on August 28, 2020.
- Randall, Alice; Little, Carter; Little, Courtney (2006). My Country Roots: The Ultimate MP3 Guide to America's Original Outsider Music. Thomas Nelson. ISBN 978-1-59555-860-2.
- Rogers, Nick (June 12, 2008). "Not your ordinary balladeer". The State Journal-Register. Archived from the original on August 28, 2020.
- Sanneh, Kelefa (December 22, 2005). "Stealth Sounds That Missed the Charts but Merit a Hearing". The New York Times. Archived from the original on August 28, 2020. (subscription required)
- Sansone, Clarissa (September 2002). "Are y'all ready for Elizabeth Cook". Country Standard Time. Archived from the original on July 2, 2020.
- Schmitt, Brad (January 14, 2003). "Elizabeth Cook looks into other label options". Brad About You. The Tennessean. p. 3A – via Newspapers.com.
- "See what's cooking on the grand stage". Opry Spotlight. The Tennessean. January 13, 2006. p. 13F – via Newspapers.com.
- Self, Whitney (May 9, 2007). "Elizabeth Cook Proves She's Got Balls". CMT. Archived from the original on August 28, 2020.
- This Side of the Moon (Inlay cover). Elizabeth Cook. Hog Country Production. August 2004.
- "This Side of the Moon". AllMusic. Archived from the original on August 28, 2020.
- Stark, Phyllis (June 29, 2002). "Cook Aims for Attention with Hey Y'all on Warner Bros". Billboard. Vol. 114, no. 30. p. 28. ISSN 0006-2510.
- Thompson, Steven (August 5, 2005). "Elizabeth Cook: This Side of the Moon (Hog County Production)". Music. The Tampa Tribune. p. 19 – via Newspapers.com.
- Wildsmith, Steve (April 27, 2011). "Elizabeth Cook takes an intensely personal journey on Welder". The Daily Times. Archived from the original on August 28, 2020.
