= The Destination =

EP by Vontongchai Intarawat
- Released: May 8, 2008
- Recorded: 2007–2008
- Genre: Rock
- Length: 18:57
- Label: True Fantasia
- Producer: Kittikorn Penroj (executive), Jirasak Panpoom (executive), Santhan Laohawattanawit

Vontongchai Intarawat chronology
| X-treme Army (2007) | The Destination (2008) |

Singles from The Destination
- 1. "เรายังรักกัน...ไม่ใช่หรอ" Released: April 10, 2008; 2. "นางฟ้าตาชั้นเดียว" Released: June 2008; 3. "แค่อยากให้รู้" Released: July 28, 2008

The Destination is the debut mini album by Thai singer-songwriter and the 1st runner-up of True Visions' Academy Fantasia season 4, Vontongchai Intarawat, as a solo artist. The official release date of this album is May 8, 2008. The album contains a special CD+VCD package (5 tracks and 5 karaoke videos).

== Track listing ==
| # | Title | Lyricist(s) | Composer(s) | Arranger(s) | Length |
|---|---|---|---|---|---|
| 1. | "เรายังรักกัน...ไม่ใช่เหรอ" | Chantima 9 | Jirasak Panpoom | Jiranat Phisittawichai | 3:50 |
| 2. | "นางฟ้าตาชั้นเดียว" | Chantima 9 | Pongsapak Tongcharoen | CPJ Team | 3:06 |
| 3. | "ขอโทษ" | Vontongchai Intarawat | Intarawat | Santhan Laohawattanawit | 4:37 |
| 4. | "แค่อยากให้รู้" | Sirapatara Kalayapanid | Raucleaner + Markarm | Raucleaner + Markarm | 3:34 |
| 5. | "เลือกลืม เลือกจำ" | Thongchai Thongoen | Sayumphoo Nilawan | Nilawan | 3:50 |

== Charts ==
| Song | Album | Radio Station | Highest Rank |
|---|---|---|---|
| เรายังรักกัน...ไม่ใช่เหรอ | The Destination | Chiangmai Radio 93.75 | 1 |
| เรายังรักกัน...ไม่ใช่เหรอ | The Destination | Seed 97.5 | 2 |
| เรายังรักกัน...ไม่ใช่เหรอ | The Destination | True Music 93.5 | 2 |
| เรายังรักกัน...ไม่ใช่เหรอ | The Destination | Love Radio 95.5 (Trang) | 2 |
| เรายังรักกัน...ไม่ใช่เหรอ | The Destination | New wave 99.0 (Kampangpet) | 2 |
| เรายังรักกัน...ไม่ใช่เหรอ | The Destination | Channel [V] Top 40 | 2 |
| เรายังรักกัน...ไม่ใช่เหรอ | The Destination | FM Max 94.5 | 3 |
| เรายังรักกัน...ไม่ใช่เหรอ | The Destination | MCOT 107.25 (Trat) | 3 |
| เรายังรักกัน...ไม่ใช่เหรอ | The Destination | Happy Time 98.0 | 3 |
| เรายังรักกัน...ไม่ใช่เหรอ | The Destination | Sunshine Radio 94.50 (Songkhla) | 4 |
| เรายังรักกัน...ไม่ใช่เหรอ | The Destination | Modern Radio 100.75 (Chiangmai) | 4 |
| เรายังรักกัน...ไม่ใช่เหรอ | The Destination | Free Radio 89.25 (Chonburi) | 7 |
| เรายังรักกัน...ไม่ใช่เหรอ | The Destination | Hotwave 91.5 | 8 |
| เรายังรักกัน...ไม่ใช่เหรอ | The Destination | Power Zone 89.0 (Phuket) | 10 |
| เรายังรักกัน...ไม่ใช่เหรอ | The Destination | NJOY 89.5 (Chiangmai) | 10 |
| เรายังรักกัน...ไม่ใช่เหรอ | The Destination | HFM 88.75 (Lopburi) | 11 |
| เรายังรักกัน...ไม่ใช่เหรอ | The Destination | Banana 89.0 | 19 |
| เรายังรักกัน...ไม่ใช่เหรอ | The Destination | Big Love 88.25 (Petchburi) | 20 |
| เรายังรักกัน...ไม่ใช่เหรอ | The Destination | City Radio Pattaya 90.25 | 22 |
| นางฟ้าตาชั้นเดียว | The Destination | Chiangmai Radio 93.75 | 2 |
| ขอโทษ | The Destination | Chiangmai Radio 93.75 | 3 |
| ขอโทษ | The Destination | Sunshine Radio 94.50 (Songkhla) | 4 |
