= Nat Sakdatorn =

Thai actor and singer-songwriter (born 1983)

- ณัฐ ศักดาทร
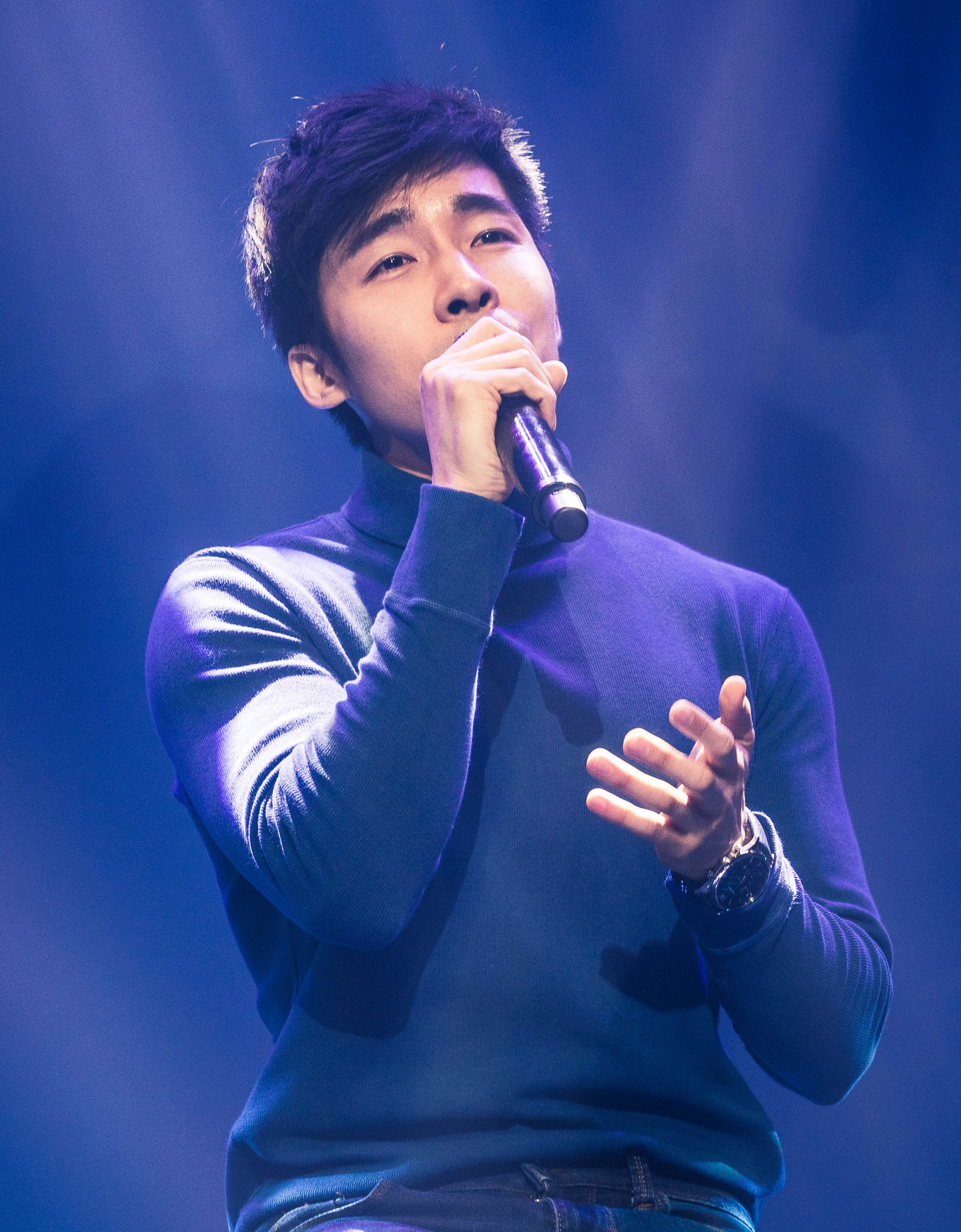
- Born: Nat Sakdatorn; January 24, 1983 (age 43); Chiang Mai, Thailand
- Occupations: Singer-songwriter; actor; runner; writer
- Years active: 2007–present
- Height: 1.70 m (5 ft 7 in)
- Website: Official website

Nat Sakdatorn (Thai: ณัฐ ศักดาทร, RTGS: Nat Sakdathon; born January 24, 1983) is a Thai singer-songwriter, actor, writer and the winner of the 4th season of reality talent show True Visions' Academy Fantasia.

== Biography ==
Nat Sakdatorn was born in Chiang Mai, Thailand. He has an older sister - Darin Sakdatorn. He attended primary school at Montfort College in Chiang Mai until grade 8, and then went to study abroad at the Peddie School in Hightstown, New Jersey, United States. After graduating as the valedictorian of the Class of 2001, he went to Harvard University to study economics. At Harvard, he auditioned and became a member of the university's oldest co-ed a cappella group, the Harvard Opportunes. Sakdatorn graduated from Harvard with a bachelor's degree in economics, with honors. After that, he spent one semester taking music courses at Berklee College of Music and then decided to return to Thailand to pursue a music career.

Before Sakdatorn entered the Academy Fantasia competition, he had a chance to work in the music industry after he sent a demo CD of his self-composed songs to the producers of the Sleepless Society albums. He sang the backing vocals for the Thai duo Golf-Mike's ขอบคุณ...ยังน้อยไป in 2006 and composed the melody for Kalorin Nemayothin's ทดแทนกันไม่ได้ in 2007.

=== Academy Fantasia ===
In 2007, Sakdatorn auditioned for the fourth season of True Academy Fantasia, singing Clash's ละครรักแท้, Savage Garden's I Want You, the winner of first season Phacharapon Junteang's Sound EFX and Westlife's cover version of Debby Boone's You Light Up My Life. He made it through final audition round to complete in the show and continued two audition weeks to be one of 12 finalists in the house, then the winner of the season. In the final week, he chose to sing Tum Somprasong' ต้องดีกว่าเก่า and You Light Up My Life once again.

=== After Academy Fantasia ===
Sakdatorn and his fellow AF4 contestants released a group album called X-Treme Army to launch their music careers together. Sakdatorn sang a solo song, แค่ชอบ, and a trio song, หวง, along with Methus Treerattanavareesin and Surasak Chanasriyotin as POP Army and a group song, Army Energy. To promote this album, all 12 AF4 singers began a nationwide concert tour, X-treme Army in Concert, which was held in Bangkok (October 13, 2007), Surat Thani (October 20, 2007), Chiang Mai (October 27, 2007) and Udon Thani (November 3, 2007). On December 15–19, 2007, Sakdatorn and his AF4 friends joined THAI Exclusive Trip with AF4 ‘X-Treme Army in Beijing’ launched by True Fantasia, Thai Airways International and Bank of Ayudhya. They all went to Beijing with their fanclub. Sakdatorn and his friends then went on to perform at Pepsi Everybody Move Concert (February 9, 2008), Big C Big Love Concert (February 16–17, 2008) and many mini-concerts. He also became a presenter for Pepsi, along with the other male singers from AF4.

Sakdatorn and Vontongchai Intarawat, the 1st runner-up of Academy Fantasia season 4, joined the 26th-anniversary Sudsupda magazine project, คนหล่อ ขอทำดี (Konlor Khor-dham-dee, literally means Smart Man Do Good). They had a mini charity concert on March 23, 2008, at plaza square between Siam Discovery and Siam Center and donated all revenue to The Cardiac Children Foundation of Thailand.

=== 2008: All You Need Is Love ===
Sakdatorn first mentioned about his debut album in variety show คืนนี้ วันนั้น on channel 5, aired on March 25, 2008, that his first single as a solo artist is รักได้อีก (Rak-Dai-Eek, meaning, "I Can Love You More"). The single is written and composed by Chestha Yarosake (except for the English rap part, which is written by Sakdatorn himself) and arranged by Banana Boat. The album is titled All You Need Is Love, and its official release date is April 25, 2008. Sakdatorn also appeared on many television shows and radio stations to promote his album and singles. The second single from this album is คำสามคำ (Kam-Sam-Kam, meaning, "Three Words") for which Sakdatorn composed music.

On May 16–21, 2008, Sakdatorn together with Vontongchai Intarawat, Rutchapon Yamsang, Wiwit Bawonkriritikajorn, Pakamon Bunyapuit and the winner of Academy Fantasia season 3, Kiatkamol Lata joined THAI Exclusive Trip with AF in Japan. And because of high demand, True Fantasia and Thai Airways International launched another special trip for Sakdatorn's and Intarawat's fanclubs, THAI Exclusive Trip with Nat-Tol Live in Sydney, on June 26 – July 2, 2008, including their first album-opening mini concert outside Thailand.

On June 4, 2008, Cartier selected Sakdatorn to become a brand ambassador for LOVE collection in Thailand. On July 14, 2008, Bank of Ayudhya chose Sakdatorn and Intarawat as brand ambassadors for Krungsri Yellow Points campaign.

On July 25, 2008, Sakdatorn was declared the winner of Dutch Mill Top Teen Idol. Having been Dutch Mill Top Teen Idol, Sakdatorn had filmed a TV ad for Dutch Mill, which went on air in November 2008.

In August 2008, Sakdatorn acted in a musical play as Prince Yamadori ( a play adapted from Madame Butterfly ). This is the second play from True Fantasia and there are two cast sets. Another cast member who plays the same role as Sakdatorn is Intarawat. To promote the play, Sakdatorn and Intarawat covered 上を向いて歩こう (best known as Sukiyaki) and released music video on July 4, 2008. But they will sing Thai version in the play.

By continuing Krungsri Yellow Points campaign under a concept of Innovation Makes Life Easy, Intarawat and Sakdatorn launched their first full live concert entitled NAT-TOL the TWO MEN Show on October 30 – November 1, 2008. The concerts were originally performed in a form of reality concert as a combination between live concert and reality show. There were 4 rounds concerts for approximately 4,000 audiences total.

On November 22, 2008, Sakdatorn's first romantic comedy drama called คลื่นฝัน วันรัก broadcast for the first time on Modern Nine TV. Sakdatorn took the leading role of มะเดี่ยว, an ambitious teenager who pursued his dream of becoming a disk jockey.

=== 2009: Concerts and musical play ===
On February 23, 2009, Sakdatorn joined the latest reality game show from True Visions called The Master. Sakdatorn with other 14 contestants from five seasons of Academy Fantasia performed to win the program's one-million-baht prize money.

On May 9, 2009, Sakdatorn and seven other AF friends performed at the Bachelors' Dream Concert at the Royal Paragon Hall, Siam Paragon.

From May 13 to 19, 2009, Sakdatorn together with Intarawat joined THAI Exclusive Trip in New Zealand with their fanclubs.

On July 29, 2009, Sakdatorn was named the 'Reader Icon 2009' award from Amarin Pocketbook Printing, resulting from the award Sakdatorn has his first pocketbook published with Amarin Pocketbook in 2010.

From October 2 to 25, 2009, Sakdatorn performed the role as 'Chanalom' in his second musical play; 'The Legend of Re Khai Fun CHALIANG The Musical' at M Theatre. The Legend of Re Kai Fun CHALIANG The Musical is the first ever jukebox musical based on songs by a Thai band. The play was co-produced by Tohklom, Workpoint and True Fantasia. Receiving a warm welcome from audience, the musical play was scheduled to re-stage from January 15 to 17, 2010.

From October 10 to 12, 2009, Sakdatorn went to Tak province to help raise funds to renovate ตชด. จุฬาฯ-ธรรมศาสตร์ 3 schools on "Joh Jai TV program" which is part of the "KRUNGSRI Yellow Points ล้านใจให้น้องเรียน" campaign. Not just only raising funds, Sakdatorn also went to the school and helped renovate it himself.

=== 2010: The Year of Music, Concerts and The First Pocketbook ===
From January 15 to 17, 2010 The Legend of Re Kai Fun CHALIANG The Musical which received a warm welcome from audience in October 2009, was re-staged. The musical play later won Chalermkrung Award for the "Best Play of the Year" by popular Thailand's social website Pantip.com.

On January 30, 2010, Sakdatorn performed as a guest in the concert called "คอนเสิร์ตเพลงรักยุคคีตา โดย นก เฉลียง" at Thailand Cultural Center where he sang "ห่วงหา" "ไม่คิดถาม" and "คนขี้เหงา". The song "ห่วงหา" was recorded along with four other songs by four different popular singers in the album called "เพลงผูกใจ". This was the first big concert for Sakdatorn outside True Fantasia label.

On February 13, 2010, Sakdatorn and his fellow AF Patcha Anekayuwat performed in the "Bangkok Jazz Festival 2010" at Central World Plaza along with many world-class Jazz artists in the 6-day show, beginning on February 9.

On February 20 and 21, 2010 Sakdatorn performed as a guest in "Once in a Lifetime concert produced by Phusit Laithong" at Thailand Cultural Center where he sang two songs – "The one you love" and "I need to know". Other guests on the concert were well-known Thai singers and musicians such as Ajarn Thanis Srikildee, Nithipong Hornak, Pod Moderndog, Bee Peerapat, Ben Chalatis, and Radkloa Amaradis.

On April 30, 2010: Sakdatorn's first single called "ไม่มีพรุ่งนี้" or "No Tomorrow" made its debut. The song was part of "the Winners project" album where all six winners of Academy Fantasia would have 2 songs each in the album. Sakdatorn himself wrote the melody of the song "ไม่มีพรุ่งนี้". The second single "นาทีเงียบงัน" or "Silent Minute" was released on September 22. (See Chart Summary)

On June 26, 2010, Sakdatorn was one of the guests in the Thai classic concert hosted by former famous Thai classic singer Rungrudee Pangpongsai at Thailand National Theater where he sang his hit song "ไม่มีพรุ่งนี้", or "No Tomorrow" and My Way.

On July 25, 2010, Sakdatorn won "Male Hot Artist Award" from TV Inside HOT Awards, TV Pool Magazine.

On July 30, 2010, Sakdatorn has expanded his career to be a singer-cum-writer as his first pocketbook titled "มองทุกอย่างจากทุกมุม" (Looking at things from every angles) was released. The book was published with Amarin Pocketbook Publishing from which he won "Reader Icon 2009 Award".

On August 22, 2010, Sakdatorn, the winner of Academy Fantasia Season 4, and five other winners of Academy Fantasia from five other seasons, performed in "KRUNGSRI The First 3D Concert: Victory of the Winners" at Indoor Stadium Huamark, Bangkok. It had been the first ever concert in Thailand that was later adapted to be 3D movie.

In late September 2010, Sakdatorn's second single "นาทีเงียบงัน" or "Silent Minute" from "The Winners Project" album made its debut.

In late October 2010, Thailand's first 3D movie concert – "ล่า ฝ่า ฝัน : Confession of the Winners", was made from "KRUNGSRI The First 3D Concert : Victory of the Winners" debut.

On November 20, 2010, Sakdatorn and Zani, the winner of Academy Fantasia season 6, performed in "KRUNGSRI presents Mr. Nat & Ms. Zani" concert at M Theatre. The 800-seat concert was fully packed with Bank of Ayudhya, or Krungsri, and Central Credit Card customers.

On December 26, 2010, Sakdatorn performed as a guest in "Once in a Lifetime concert produced by Phusit Laithong, Restage" at Thailand Cultural Center.

=== 2011: Second Solo Album '361° NAT SAKDATORN' ===
Nat Sakdatorn kept focusing on his singing career with his second solo album set to release in August 2011. Besides, the album his other works this year included concerts and musical play.

His first pocket book "มองทุกอย่างจากทุกมุม", or "Looking at things in every angles" written in 2011, was to be re-printed after the book received award from Education Ministry on Fiction book for Children Aged between 12–18 category on March 25, 2011.

On January 23, 2011, Sakdatorn and Sony Music's singer Dan Worrawech performed in Concert Cover Night Plus: More than Love by Greenwave.

In March 2011, Sakdatorn and his fellow AF performed in "KRUNGSRI AF Comedy Show Must Go On" at Thunder Dome.

On April 19, 2011, Sakdatorn's first single "ดับไฟด้วยน้ำมัน" or "Dubfai duaynammun" from '361° NAT SAKDATORN' album was released.

On April 25, 2011, Sakdatorn performed in "Get The Concert: MY ORIGINAL SOUNDTRACK" by Get 102.5 at SF World Cinema where he sang two solo and one duet songs with his fellow AF friend Patcha Anekayuwat.

In May, Dunkin' Donuts Thailand has appointed Sakdatorn and his two fellows, Vontongchai Intrawat from AF4 and Saharat Naruekupcharnchai from AF5, to be presenters of its campaign "โชค DD ยกกำลัง 2". The campaign was to last until the end of the year.

On July 10, 2011, Sakdatorn and his fellow AF4 friends had a concert "KRUNGSRI AF4 Re-stage Concert" at Thai-Japanese Stadium.

On August 9, 2011, Sakdatorn's second single "คิดถึงดังดัง" from his "361° NAT SAKDATORN" album debut.

On September 3, 2011, Sakdatorn won "Popular Male Artist" from Channel V Thailand 2011 Music Video Awards.

On September 9–25, 2011 Sakdatorn played "Nick Piazza" in Thai version of "FAME the Musical" which was adapted from the popular New York's Broadway musical play.

On December 7, 2011, Sakdatorn's second single "คิดถึงดังดัง" from the album "361° NAT SAKDATORN" received "No.1 Music Chart November 2011" award from Intensive Watch, an independent company that monitors every second of music & ads on radio stations, TV and cable TV.

=== 2012: A big change ===
Sakdatorn had a big change on his career path when he decided not to renew his contract with True Fantasia (contract ended on September 15) and signed a new contract with Musiccream, one of the record labels of GMM Grammy. The new contract, started from October 1, 2012, was to last five years.

This year also saw Sakdatorn become a guest on several concerts starting with Do for Dad (March), etc. [Back to Basic] (July), Overcoat Music Festival 2012 (December), to Silver Lake Jazz Fest 2012 (December).

His only single debut this year was "หนึ่งคำที่รอ" or "One word that I've been waiting for" under True Fantasia label.

Sakdatorn won Seed 97.5 Male Solo Artist of the Year in March. Seed 97.5 is one of the major radio channels in Thailand. His song "คิดถึงดังดัง" also won "Song of the Year Award" from Bang Awards 2012. Bang Awards was held by Bang Channel, a cable TV channel under GMM Grammy.

== Filmography ==
=== Film ===
Year	Title	Role	Notes
2016	Fathers	Yuke	Main Role

=== Television ===
Year	Title	Role	Notes	Channel
2015	Ugly Duckling Series: Perfect Match	Dr. Sakda (Ep. 2, 6-7)	Guest Role	GMM 25
2016	Club Friday The Series Season 8: True Love…or Pleasure	Taen	Main Role	GMM 25
2016	Bad Friends	Art	Main Role	GMM 25
2018	Sampat Ruttikan	Dr. Mekha	Support Role	GMM 25
2018	Oh My Ghost	Muadprin	Main Role	True4U
2018	Friend Zone	Dr. Sam	Main Role	One 31
2019	Rong Tao Naree	N/A	Support Role	Amarin TV
2020	Woon Ruk Nakkao	Itthipol Narupat / "Ith"	Support Role	PPTV
2020	Friend Zone 2: Dangerous Area	Dr. Sam	Main Role	GMM 25
2021	Let’s Eat	Panthep	Main Role	Netflix, True4U
2021	Luang Kah Lah Ruk	Siptis	Support Role	PPTV
2022	Never Let Me Go	Nueng’s uncle	Support Role	GMM 25
2022	Mummy Tee Tak	Chanachol	Main Role	Channel 3
2022	Mia Luang 2022	Kunlawet	Support Role	WeTV; Channel 8

=== Theater ===
Year	Title	Role	Notes
2008	KRUNGSRI AF the Musical ตอน โจโจ้ซัง		
2009	The Legend of เร่ขายฝัน		
2011	FAME The Musical (Original Thai Cast Recording)	Nick Piazza	
2015	วันสละโสดกับโจทก์เก่าๆ The Musical	Dr. Un	
2018	Ban Lung Mek The Musical บัลลังก์เมฆ เดอะมิวสิคัล	Pakorn	

== Discography ==
=== Studio albums ===
Year	Album title	Notes
2007	X-Treme Army	With AF4
2008	All You Need Is Love	1st Solo Album
2011	361° NAT SAKDATORN	2nd Solo Album

=== Singles ===
Year	Album title	Notes
2010	ไม่มีพรุ่งนี้	1st single from The Winners Project Album
2010	นาทีเงียบงัน	2nd single from The Winners Project Album
2011	ดับไฟด้วยน้ำมัน	1st single from '361° NAT SAKDATORN'
2011	คิดถึงดังดัง	2nd single from '361° NAT SAKDATORN'
2012	ฉันยังอยู่ทั้งคน	3rd single from '361° NAT SAKDATORN'
2012	หนึ่งคำที่รอ	4th single from '361° NAT SAKDATORN'
2014	ยิ่งคุยยิ่งเหงา	1st single under MusicCream record label, GMM Grammy
2015	รักเธอคนเดียว	
2015	ครั้งหนึ่งในชีวิต	
2017	ใจพังพัง	
2017	ชื่อเธอ	
2019	ฉันเห็น	1st song after being independent artist

=== OST / musicals ===
Year	Album title	Notes
2008	คลื่นใจ	คลื่นฝัน...วันรัก OST
2008	KRUNGSRI AF the Musical ตอน โจโจ้ซัง	Musical album
2009	ก้าวเดินไปในหนทางพอเพียง	I Will Do for King Project
2009	The Legend of เร่ขายฝัน	Musical album
2010	ห่วงหา	Special Studio Album "Pleng Rak Yuk Keta by Nok Chaliang" Concert
2011	ใกล้..กันไว้ก่อน	(HIV ป้องกันได้) Campaign by Research Centre for Health Economics and Evaluation
2011	ครองแผ่นดินโดยธรรม	Anniversary Celebration of King Rama IX
2011	บ้านเรา บ้านพ่อ	Produced by Nitipong Honark to Flood Relief Campaign
2015	รักไม่มีเงื่อนไข	Love Sick OST with Vonthongchai Intrawat
2016	ความหมายที่หายไป	Fathers OST
2019	รักแท้หรือแค่เกม	เพลิงรักเพลิงแค้น OST

== Brand ambassador/presenter ==
2008

- 'Wall' TV Commercial from Pepsi
- ‘Truemove’ Campaign
- Thailand Brand Ambassador for Cartier LOVE Collection
- 'KRUNGSRI Yellow Points' Campaign by Bank of Ayudhya Public Company Limited
- 'Jigsaw' TV Commercial from 'Top Teen Idol 2008' Campaign by Dutchmill
- IPhone 3G by Truemove

2009

- Brand Ambassador for Cha Raming Tea
- ‘Movie Lovers Double Fun’ by True Privileage

2010

- 'Greennut Green Jackpot Season 5' Campaign by Greennut
- 3G+Wifi by Truemove
- KRUNGSRI The Winner Debit Card Bank of Ayudhya Public Company Limited

2011

- Presenter of 'Earth Hour 2011' Project by WWF
- Presenter of 'Astro Kids 2011' by National Astronomical Research Institute of Thailand (Pulblic Organization)
- 'Lun Thong Lun Thiew Kiew Ploean’ (ลุ้นทอง ลุ้นเที่ยว เคี้ยวเพลิน) and 'Rak Thai Thiew Thai Pai with Greennut’ (รักษ์ไทย เที่ยวไทย ไปกับกรีนนัท) by Greennut
- 'Chok DD Yok Kum Lung 2' (โชค DD ยกกำลัง 2) Campaign by Dunkin' Donuts Thailand

2012

- TrueMove ‘24 hours toll free’ (โปรโทรฟรียกก๊วน) by TrueMove
- TrueLife+ TrueMove H new Promotion + TrueVisions Gold Lite Package
- 'Dai Boon Dai Chok with Greennut’ (ได้บุญ ได้โชค กับกรีนนัท) Campaign by Greennut

2013

- 'Greennut Trendy Healthy Snack' Campaign by Greennut

2018

- Brand Ambassador for Sporade

== Publication ==
2010

- 'Looking at Everything from Every Angle’ (มองทุกอย่างจากทุกมุม), described the priceless experiences and other important lessons of studying at Harvard University, both inside and outside the classroom in order to apply to everyday life.

== Special projects ==
2008

- ‘Kon Lor Kor Tum Dee’ (คนหล่อขอทำดี) Project by Sudsapda Magazine, performing the street buskers donation to Thai Heart Foundation Under Royal Patronage
- ‘KRUNGSRI Yellow Points : Blanket Donation to Hill Tribe Children’ (คลายความหนาวเพิ่มไออุ่น… แก่น้องๆ ให้นอนหลับฝันดี)

2009

- 'I Will Do for King: Sufficiency Economy ' Project
- 'KRUNGSRI Yellow Points: Larn Jai Hai Nong Rean’ (ล้านใจให้น้องเรียน) Project by Johjai TV program to build and repair the distance school

2012

- 'I Will Do for King: Sang Som Sook Yangyongyuen ' (สร้าง ซ่อม สุข อย่างยั่งยืน) Project to assist the Thai flood victims recovery

2018

- 'Money Guru' for 'Sud Sap Da' online magazine

2019

- 'Money Guru' for 'Sud Sap Da' online magazine
- 'King of Alpha Male' in Reality TV show 'Cute Boy Thailand Project' on True4U

== Awards and nominations ==
Year	Awards	Category	Nominated work	Result
2007	Academy Fantasia 4	Winner		Won
2008	Dutch Mill	Top Teen Idol		Won
2009	Amarin Award	Reader Icon		Won
2009	TV Inside HOT Awards	Hot Male New Artist of the Year		Won
2010	TV Inside HOT Awards	Hot Male New Artist of the Year		Won
2011	Ministry of Education	Honorable Mentioned Award	'Looking at Everything from Every Angle’ (มองทุกอย่างจากทุกมุม)	Won
2011	BANG Awards 2011	Song of the Year	นาทีเงียบงัน	Nominated
2011	Channel [V] Thailand Music Video Awards No. 7	Most Popular Male Artist Award		Won
2011	Intensive Watch	No.1 Music Chart November 2011	คิดถึงดังดัง	Won
2012	You2Play Awards 2011	Favorite Male Artist		Nominated
2012	SEED Awards No. 7	Most Popular SEED Artist		Won
2012	Nine Entertain Awards 2012	Male Artist of the Year		Nominated
2012	BANG Awards 2012	Favorite Solo Artist		Nominated
2012	BANG Awards 2012	Song of the Year	คิดถึงดังดัง	Won
2013	Guitar Mag Awards No. 2	Best Male Artist		Nominated
2013	SEED Awards No. 8	Most Popular Song of the Year	ฉันยังอยู่ทั้งคน	Nominated
2013	Nine Entertain Awards 2013	Male Artist of the Year		Nominated

== Concerts ==
Year	Event	Place
2007	X-Treme Army	Impact Arena
2007	Krungsri AF Funtasia	Dream World
2008	Pepsi AF Move Tem Max	Thunder Dome
2008	Big C Big Love Concert with AF4	Thunder Dome
2008	Nat & His Love featuring Phusit Laithong	Karafun
2008	KRUNGSRI presents Nat-Tol The Two Men Show	M Theatre
2008	KRUNGSRI AF Funtasia: Cooling the World	Safari World
2009	Another Side of Dream featuring Nueng ETC and Lookpad	Karafun
2009	The Master Concert	Thunder Dome
2009	Bachelors' Dream Concert	Royal Paragon Hall
2009	Take It Easy: Freestyle by Nat & A Cappella 7	Slim RCA
2009	The GREATEST of the KINGS, The GREETINGS of the LAND Concert	The Ananta Samakhom Throne Hall
2009	KRUNGSRI AF Fans Festival Concert	Chulalongkorn University Stadium
2010	Pleng Rak Yuk Keta by Nok Chaliang Concert (เพลงรักยุคคีตา โดย นกเฉลียง)	Thailand Cultural Centre
2010	Rajinian AF Concert	Rajinian School
2010	Bangkok Jazz Festival	Central World
2010	Once in a Lifetime Concert produced by Phusit Laithong	Thailand Cultural Centre
2010	Rung Radee…Kon Na Dem (รุ่งฤดี…คนหน้าเดิม)	National Theatre
2010	KRUNGSRI The First 3D Concert: Victory of the Winners	Indoor Stadium
2010	KRUNGSRI presents Mr.Nat & Ms.Zani Concert	M Theatre
2010	Once in a Lifetime Concert produced by Phusit Laithong [Restage]	Thailand Cultural Centre
2011	Cover Night Plus: MORE THAN LOVE by Greenwave 106.5	Curve
2011	KRUNGSRI AF Comedy Show Must Go On Concert	Thunder Dome
2011	Get The Concert: MY ORIGINAL SOUNDTRACK by Get 102.5	SF World Cinema
2011	AF4 Re-Stage	Thai-Japan Bangkok Youth Center
2011	84 Pansa Mahamongkul (Celebration for 84 years of King Rama XI) Concert	Niyompanich Hall
2011	KRUNGSRI AF ALL SEASONS Concert	Impact Arena
2012	KRUNGSRI Simple To Share Concert	Aksara Theatre
2012	Do for Dad Concert	Impact Arena
2012	ETC.[back to basic]	BITEC
2012	AF4 Joubpa!!!' (AF4 จบป่ะ!!!)	Grand Hall Thammasat University
2013	Ploenchit Concert	Impact Arena
2018	AF4 Flashback Concert	Grand Hall Thammasat University

=== Chart summary ===
Year 2010 Chart Summary for Song 'ไม่มีพรุ่งนี้' and 'นาทีเงียบงัน'
(Chart of the Year from radios and cable TV channels)

- Music Video

Channel V: Top 100 MV Popular Thai Song of the Year 2010
No. 9 เพลงไม่มีพรุ่งนี้
No. 79 เพลงนาทีเงียบงัน

True Music Top 100 of the Year 2010 Thai and International Song Chart
No. 3 เพลงไม่มีพรุ่งนี้ (1,146,675)
No. 20 เพลงนาทีเงียบงัน (397,914)

True Music TOP DOWNLOAD
เพลงไม่มีพรุ่งนี้ Year 2010 TOP DOWNLOAD

- คลื่นวิทยุ

Thai Song of the Year 2010 Chart from 40 Bangkok and suburb FM Radio by Intensive Watch
No. 15 เพลงไม่มีพรุ่งนี้ (Total spin 7,525 times)

Virgin Hitz 100 Countdown
No. 17 เพลงไม่มีพรุ่งนี้
No. 56 เพลงนาทีเงียบงัน

EFM 94 Top Airplay of the Year
No. 31 เพลงไม่มีพรุ่งนี้ (Total spin 2,777)

OK Love : Top 100 of the Year 2010
No. 1 เพลงไม่มีพรุ่งนี้
No. 32 เพลงนาทีเงียบงัน

Boom Hitz Station Chonburi Top 50 of the Year 2010
No. 4 เพลงนาทีเงียบงัน

MC Radio Samut Sakhon Top 25 of the Year 2010
No. 2 เพลงไม่มีพรุ่งนี้

Year 2010 Hit 100 Song of ZFM Surat
No. 1 เพลงไม่มีพรุ่งนี้
No. 4 เพลงนาทีเงียบงัน

== See also ==
- Academy Fantasia
