= Welder (album) =

Studio album by Elizabeth Cook
- Released: May 11, 2010
- Studios: House of Blues and Strange Magic Studios (Nashville, Tennessee); Karma East (Hollywood, California)
- Genres: Americana; Country
- Length: 43:12
- Label: 31 Tigers
- Producer: Don Was

Elizabeth Cook chronology
| Balls (2007) | Welder (2010) | Gospel Plow (2012) |

Welder is the fifth studio album by American country musician Elizabeth Cook. It was produced by Don Was and released on May 11, 2010 on 31 Tigers Records. The album's title is a reference to Cook's father's former occupation as a welder. Artists performing on the album include Dwight Yoakam, Rodney Crowell, Bones Hillman, and Cook's husband Tim Carroll. Welder was Cook's final album before she was forced to attend rehab for drug addiction and an eating disorder following the collapse of her marriage and death of six family members. Cook would not release another studio album until 2017.

== Critical reception ==
Welder received mainly favorable reviews from critics, and was ranked the 23rd best album of 2010 (out of 30) by Rolling Stone.

Welder was nominated for the Album of the Year award and Song of the Year (for El Camino) at the 2011 Americana Awards and Elizabeth Cook was also nominated for Artist of the Year because of the album.

The Washington Post described the album as Cook's best yet, because it was "rawer [than her previous four albums] in all the best senses of that word."

Professional ratings
Review scores
| Source | Rating |
|---|---|
| Allmusic | 3.5/5 stars |
| The Guardian | 3/5 stars |
| Paste | 8.4/10 |
| PopMatters | 8/10 stars |
| Robert Christgau | A |

== Track listing ==
| No. | Title | Writer(s) | Length |
|---|---|---|---|
| 1. | "All the Time" | Elizabeth Cook | 2:53 |
| 2. | "El Camino" | E. Cook | 2:43 |
| 3. | "Not California" | Gary Maurer, Dan Messe | 3:52 |
| 4. | "Heroin Addict Sister" | E. Cook | 4:01 |
| 5. | "Yes to Booty" | E. Cook | 2:04 |
| 6. | "Blackland Farmer" | Frankie Miller | 2:35 |
| 7. | "Girlfriend Tonight" | E. Cook | 3:09 |
| 8. | "Rock N Roll Man" | E. Cook | 3:11 |
| 9. | "Mama's Funeral" | E. Cook | 4:00 |
| 10. | "I'm Beginning to Forget" | Joyce Cook | 3:08 |
| 11. | "Snake in the Bed" | E. Cook | 2:05 |
| 12. | "Follow You Like Smoke" | Tim Carroll | 3:35 |
| 13. | "I'll Never Know" | E. Cook, Jim McBride, Jerry Salley | 2:51 |
| 14. | "'Til Then" | Carroll | 3:05 |

== Personnel ==
- Elizabeth Cook – vocals, acoustic guitars
- Tim Atwood – keyboards, backing vocals (2, 5)
- Tim Carroll – electric guitars, slide guitar, banjo, harmonica, backing vocals
- Gary Maurer – acoustic guitars (3)
- Tony Paoletta – steel guitar, backing vocals (2, 5)
- Matt Combs – mandolin, fiddle, strings, backing vocals (2, 5)
- Bones Hillman – bass, backing vocals (2, 5)
- Marco Giovino – drums, backing vocals (2, 5)
- Buddy Miller – backing vocals (1)
- Rodney Crowell – backing vocals (3, 10)
- The Carol Lee Singers – backing vocals (7, 10)
- Dwight Yoakam – backing vocals (13)

=== Production ===
- Don Was – producer
- Krish Sharma – recording, mixing
- Heather Strum – assistant engineer
- Ted Wheeler – assistant engineer
- Tom Spaulding – additional engineer
- Yes Master (Nashville, Tennessee) – mastering location
- Kristin Barlowe – photography
- Theo Antoniadis – design
- Veta Cicolello – design
- Suzy Kipp – stylist
- Brady Wardlaw – hair, make-up

== Chart performance ==
| Chart (2010) | Peak position |
|---|---|
| US Top Country Albums (Billboard) | 43 |
| US Heatseekers Albums (Billboard) | 23 |
