= Love Is All You Need (disambiguation) =

Love Is All You Need is a 2012 Danish film starring Pierce Brosnan and Trine Dyrholm. It may also refer to:

- Love Is All You Need? (2011 film), a 2011 short film
  - Love Is All You Need? (2016 film), based on the short film
- "Love Is All You Need", a 1978 song by High Inergy
- "Love Is All You Need", a 1987 song by Sarah Cracknell
- "Love Is All You Need", a 1998 episode of Bear in the Big Blue House
- "Love Is All You Need", a 2006 episode of The Royal
- "Love Is All You Need", a song performed by Nico for the Eurovision Song Contest 2007

== See also ==
- Love Is All We Need (disambiguation)
- All You Need Is Love (disambiguation)
