= Vonthongchai Intarawat =

Thai singer (born 1987)

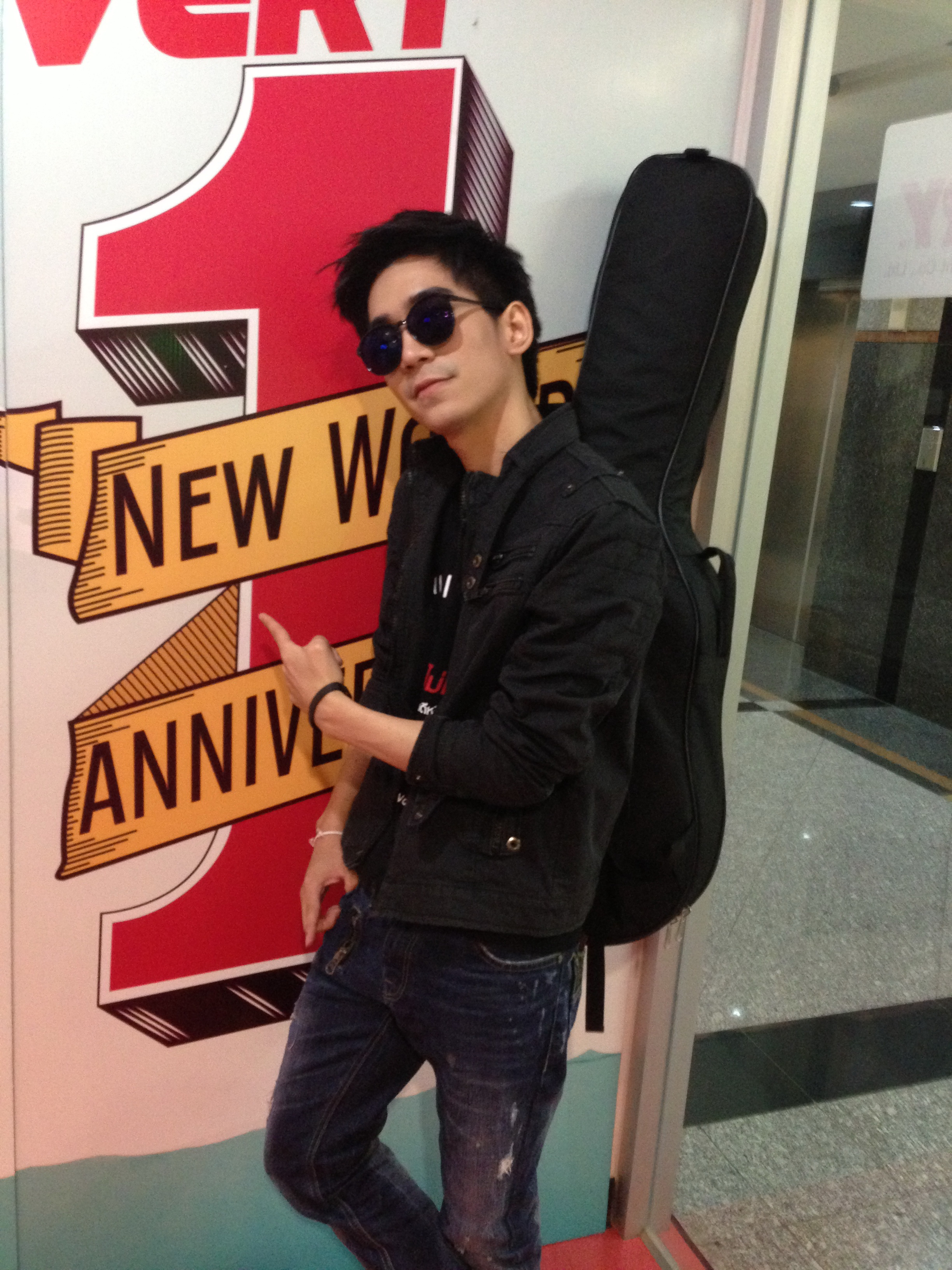
- Intarawat in 2013

Background information
- Born: วันธงชัย อินทรวัตร; December 23, 1987 (age 38); Chiang Mai, Thailand
- Genres: Pop, R&B, Rock
- Occupation: Singer-songwriter
- Years active: 2007–present
- Label: True Fantasia
- Website: www.tolaf.com www.nat-tol.com

Vonthongchai Intarawat (Thai: วันธงชัย อินทรวัตร) (born December 23, 1987) is a Thai singer-songwriter and the runner-up of the 4th season of reality talent show True Visions's Academy Fantasia.

== Biography ==
Vonthongchai Intarawat or Tol was born in Chiang Mai, Thailand. He studied at Anubaan Chiang Mai School, Yupparaj Wittayalai School, and then the Faculty of Law in Payap University in Chiang Mai. He is a junior-year student but dropping it for the reality show Academy Fantasia competition to pursue his dream of becoming a singer.

Intarawat has been involved with music since he was a child. As Intarawat's father had been a musician and songwriter, Intarawat was highly encouraged to learn playing many musical instruments. At the age of seven, he was first introduced to play electone. Later on, with Intarawat's good sense of music and personal talent, he can altogether play piano, guitar, bass guitar, violin, drum and flute. By this reason, he is now well known for the ability to identify the frequency of specific musical tone or absolute pitch.

During Intarawat's childhood, he actively participated in a lot of musical activities including attending different singing contests such as Panasonic Star Challenge, Nescafé Music Challenge, and won Lactasoy singing competition for the first prize. He also became a part of the youth choir in primary school, and playing flute in school's orchestra during his secondary years.

In 2005, Intarawat joined and teamed up with a group of young artists from Northern Thailand called Go-getter as a part of the Office of the Narcotics Control Board of Thailand's special campaign to fight against narcotics and allurements. He and the team finally released a full-length album consisting of 10 songs, one of which Intarawat sang is entitled poo ying dee dee (Thai: ผู้หญิงดีดี).

=== Academy Fantasia ===
In 2007, Intarawat auditioned for the fourth season of True Academy Fantasia in Chiangmai and Bangkok, singing Emotion Town's het gert jaak kwaam ngao (Thai: เหตุเกิดจากความเหงา), Crescendo's Aroma, Calories Blah Blah's kon tee mai kao dtaa (Thai: คนที่ไม่เข้าตา), Big Ass’s Len Kong Soong (Thai: เล่นของสูง), and Ice's kon mun ruk (Thai: คนมันรัก). He made it through final audition round to complete in the show and continued two audition weeks to be one of 12 finalists in the house, then the runner-up of the season. In the final week, he chose to sing Clash’s ter ja yoo gup chun dta-lort bai (Thai: เธอจะอยู่กับฉันตลอดไป) and Instinct's bproht song krai maa rak chan tee (Thai: โปรดส่งใครมารักฉันที).

=== After Academy Fantasia ===
When Academy Fantasia 4 ended, Intarawat and his fellow AF4 contestants released a group album entitled X-treme Army to launch their music careers under True Fantasia together. Intarawat sang a solo song, khon tee yoo trong na (Thai: คนที่อยู่ตรงหน้า), and a trio song, Time Machine as Rock Army and a group song, Army Energy. To promote this album, all 12 AF4 singers began a nation-wide concert tour, X-treme Army in Concert, which was held in Bangkok, Surat Thani, Chiang Mai, and Udon Thani.

In December 2007, Intarawat and his AF4 friends joined THAI Exclusive Trip with AF4 ‘X-Treme Army in Beijing’ launched by True Fantasia, Thai Airways International and Bank of Ayudhya, as the fourth campaign of Thai Airways International with AF. After that, Intarawat and other AF4 members continued to further promote the album by performing many concerts including Pepsi Everybody Move Concert, and Big C Big Love Concerts in Bangkok. During the time, Intarawat also became a presenter for Pepsi, along with the other male singers from AF4.

In March 2008, Intarawat and Nat Sakdatorn, the winner of Academy Fantasia season 4, joined Sudsapda's 26th Anniversary Project called kon lor khor dham dee (Thai: คนหล่อขอทำดี) and had a mini charity concert to raise money in helping impoverished people. After the project ended, Intarawat and Nat Sakdatorn had donated all revenue with total amount of 283,750 baht to the Cardiac Children Foundation of Thailand.

=== 2008: The Destination ===
In May 2008, Intarawat released his debut pop rock album as a solo artist titled The Destination, which consists of 5 songs including rao yung ruk kun...mai chai rur (Thai: เรายังรักกัน...ไม่ใช่เหรอ), nang fah ta chun diew (Thai: นางฟ้าตาชั้นเดียว), kor tode (Thai: ขอโทษ), kae yark hai roo (Thai: แค่อยากให้รู้), and luek luem Luek jum (Thai: เลือกลืม เลือกจำ). Then, Intarawat and other AF members joined THAI Exclusive Trip with AF in Japan. After previous success and high demand, True Fantasia and Thai Airways International launched another special trip only for Intarawat's and Nat Sakdatorn's fanclub, THAI Exclusive Trip with Nat-Tol Live in Sydney in June 2008, including providing their first album-opening mini concert outside Thailand.

In July 2008, Bank of Ayudhya chose Intarawat and Sakdatorn as brand ambassadors for Krungsri Yellow Points campaign, presenting a new generation of people with unique lifestyles. Such campaign aims to increase transactions and provide services through Krungsri ATMs and Krungsri Online service.

In August 2008, Intarawat performed in AF the Musical Play called Jo-Jo San, Thai adaptation of Madame Butterfly as Prince Yamadori. Such play was performed in 2 cast sets, in which another cast member who plays the same role as Intarawat is Sakdatorn. To promote the play, Intarawat and Sakdatorn covered Sukiyaki (Japanese: 上を向いて歩こう), and also released music video in July 2008.

By continuing Krungsri Yellow Points campaign under a concept of Innovation Makes Life Easy, Intarawat and Sakdatorn launched their first full live concert entitled NAT-TOL the TWO MEN Show on October 30 – November 1, 2008. The concert was originally performed in a form of reality concert as a combination between live concert and reality show.

=== 2009: The winner of The Master ===
The Master is the alternative 1 month long reality show to find out the best of AF stars from 5 seasons. The show consists of the winner and 1st runner up for all AF seasons (AF1 – AF5), including the 5 AF stars voted from AF fans.

There are 15 AF stars joined this reality show:

- AF1: Vit – Jeen
- AF2: Aof – Patcha – Pas
- AF3: Tui – Tar
- AF4: Nat – Tol – Tee – Papang – Music
- AF5: Natthew – Ron – Beau

These 15 people are divided into 3 groups call M1, M2, and M3:

- M1: Vit – Tui – Tol – Tee – Music
- M2: Jeen – Tar – Nat – Ron – Beau
- M3: Aof – Patcha – Pas – Papang – Natthew

Each week (started from 2nd week), 1 team will be walked out from the game if it gets the lowest votes.

- 1st week: Karaboa theme (คาราบาว) – no team walk out
- 2nd week: Rock theme based on Chatree Kongsuwan's songs – M3
- 3rd week: Country – Motown theme based on Boyd Kosiyabong's songs – M2
- 4th week: 2nd language song + own composed song (Compete individually)

Tol's song for each week:

- 1st week: Vanipok Panejorn (วณิพกเพนจร)
- 2nd week: Sakwan (สักวัน)
- 3rd week: Chuang-Vela-tee-dee-tee-sud/ Rak (ช่วงเวลาที่ดีที่สุด/ เพลงรัก)
- 4th week: I'll make love to you/ Rak mum mai (รักมุมใหม่) – rhythm by Tol

After four weeks, Tol won the 1st prize of The Master.

== Discography ==
=== Albums ===
- 2005: Go-getter
- 2007: X-treme Army
- 2008: The Destination
- 2009: Single "Rak-moom-mai (New side of love)"
- 2009: 2 Singles of Ost. เศรษฐีข้างเขียง (Soap Opera at Channel 3): Jai Mai Yud Fan (ใจไม่หยุดฝัน) and Pua Rak Thur (เพื่อรักเธอ)
- 2010: Ost. With love—Single "Ni-yam-rak (Love definition)"

== Works ==
=== Presenter ===
- Pepsi
- Bank of Ayudhya : Krungsri Yellow Points

=== Play ===
2008

- AF The Musical : Jo-Jo San in Yamadori-san Price

(Thai adaptation of Madame Butterfly) (August 9–31, 2008, 19 rounds and August 5–6, 2008, 2 exclusive rounds for charity)

- Movie ads: Pepsi named "Pepsi เต็มที่เลย”—Nat Tol Tee Music Jack Joe

2009

- The Legend of RekhaiFan the musical in San-Koa

( October 2–24, 2009, 21 rounds including 4 sponsored rounds and re-stage on January 15–17, 2010, 3 rounds)

- Main Actor of "Raberd Terdteng" (ระเบิดเถิดเทิง) in Bean (On TV5 at 2 – 3pm)
- Guest Actor of "Suek Wan Chu Jai" (ศึกวันชูใจ) part ค้นฟ้าคว้าใจ 1-2 in Star (On TV7)
- Guest Actor of "Te wa da sa thu" (เทวดาสาธุ) part แผนการร้ายนายจอมเหวี่ยง in Toe (On TV3)
- Guest Actor of "Talok hok Chak" (ตลกหกฉาก) (On TV5)
- Movie ads: “ Krungsri Yellowpoint” part VDO Game
- Movie ads: “Krungsri Yellowpoint” part Yellow Points
- Movie ads: True Move named “TrueMove – Dual Sim”
- Movie ads: True Vision named “True Vision – 3D glasses”
- Movie ads: “Krungsri Yellowpoint” part Krungsri ATM give and give (มีแต่ให้)

2010

- Main Actor of "Raberd Terdteng" (ระเบิดเถิดเทิง) in Bean (On TV5 at 2 – 3.30 pm)
- Main Actor of "Sed tee kang keang" (เศรษฐีข้างเขียง) in A-Lharn (On TV3)
- Main Actor of "Koo rak chak sok" (คู่รักชักศอก) in Thong (On True Vision Ch Hahey 9.30 – 10.00pm)
- Main Actor of "With Love" Movie in Ken on Showing on March 25, 2010

=== AF Exclusive Trip ===
- December 15–19, 2007 : Thai Exclusive Trip with AF4 'X-treme Army in Beijing'
- May 16–21, 2008 : Thai Exclusive Trip with AF 'AF in Japan'
- June 18–21, 2008: Pepsi Present AF4 presenters in Beijing
- June 26 – July 2, 2008 : Thai Exclusive Trip with AF 'Nat & Tol Live in Sydney'
- Oct 23–26, 2008: Krungsri present Nat-Tol in Japan
- February 6–9, 2009: Thai Exclusive Trip with AF in Nepal
- May 13–19, 2009 : Thai Exclusive Trip with AF 'Nat & Tol Live in New Zealand'
- November 6–8, 2009: The bachelor Dream Trip at Krabi

=== VCD/DVD/Non-Studio Album ===
- Exclusive Fashion VCD/DVD 'Club AF : Sand Sea & Me'
- VCD X-treme Army in Concert
- AF The Musical 'Jo-Jo San'
- Original soundtrack 'Rea-khai-fan'
- Soundtrack 'Rea-khai-fan' (Recorded from the play)

=== Concert ===
- October 13, 2007 : AF4 X-treme Army in Concert No. 1 in Bangkok
- October 20, 2007 : AF4 X-treme Army in Concert #2in Surat Thani
- October 27, 2007 : AF4 X-treme Army in Concert No. 3 in Chiangmai
- November 3, 2007 : AF4 X-treme Army in Concert No. 4 in Udon Thani
- December 2, 2007 : Krungsri AF Funtasia at Dream World
- February 9, 2008 : Pepsi AF Everybody Move Concert at Thunder Dome
- February 16, 2008 : Big C Big Love No. 1 at Thunder Dome
- February 17, 2008 : Big C Big Love No. 2 at Thunder Dome
- October 30, 2008 : Nat-Tol the Two Men Show No. 1 at M Theater
- October 31, 2008 : Nat-Tol the Two Men Show No. 2 at M Theater
- November 1, 2008 : Nat-Tol the Two Men Show No. 3 at M Theater
- November 1, 2008 : Nat-Tol the Two Men Show No. 4 at M Theater
- December 14, 2008 : Krungsri AF Funtasia at Safari World
- May 9, 2009: The Bachelor of Dream concert at Siam Paragon
- Complete list of Vonthongchai Intarawat's concerts and mini-concerts

=== Others ===
- Sudsapda's 26th Anniversary Project kon lor khor dham dee (Thai: คนหล่อขอทำดี)

== See also ==
- Academy Fantasia
