= Balls (Elizabeth Cook album) =

Studio album by Elizabeth Cook
- Released: May 1, 2007
- Recorded: 2007
- Studios: Treasure Isle Studios (Berry Hill, Tennessee)
- Genre: Country
- Length: 32:56
- Label: Emergent
- Producer: Rodney Crowell

Elizabeth Cook chronology
| This Side of the Moon (2004) | Balls (2007) | Welder (2010) |

Professional ratings
Review scores
| Source | Rating |
|---|---|
| Allmusic | link |
| PopMatters | link |
| Rolling Stone | link |
| Twang Nation | link |

Balls is the third major-label album of country music singer Elizabeth Cook. It was released May 1, 2007, on 31 Tigers Records. The album includes the single "Sometimes It Takes Balls to Be a Woman", which did not chart. The title track was however nominated for Song of the Year at the 2007 Americana Music Awards.

== Track listing ==
All songs written by Elizabeth Cook except where noted.

1. "Times Are Tough in Rock 'N Roll" - 2:05
2. "Don't Go Borrowing Trouble" - 2:46
3. "Sometimes It Takes Balls to Be a Woman" (Cook, Melinda Schneider) - 3:17
4. "Rest Your Weary Mind" (Cook, Melinda Schneider) - 3:19
5. "He Got No Heart" - 2:11
6. "Mama's Prayers" - 3:11
7. "Sunday Morning" (John Cale, Lou Reed) - 3:12
8. "What Do I Do" - 2:39
9. "Down Girl" - 3:11
10. "Gonna Be" (Cook, Tim Carroll) - 2:03
11. "Always Tomorrow" - 5:02

== Personnel ==
- Elizabeth Cook – lead vocals
- Tim Lauer – acoustic piano, organ
- Richard Bennett – acoustic guitars, electric guitars
- Tim Carroll – acoustic guitars, electric guitars, juice harp
- Rodney Crowell – acoustic guitars, backing vocals, vocals (9)
- Kenny Vaughan – electric guitars
- Greg Davis – banjo
- Matt Combs – mandolin, fiddle
- Alison Prestwood – bass
- Michael Rhodes – bass
- Harry Stinson – drums
- Maria Ramirez – backing vocals
- Nanci Griffith – backing vocals, vocals (9)
- Bobby Bare Jr. – backing vocals (4)

=== Production ===
- Rodney Crowell – producer
- Peter Coleman – recording, mixing
- Brandon Epps – assistant engineer
- Sam Martin – assistant engineer
- Kristin Barlowe – photography
- Heather Dryden – art direction, design
- Pierrette Abegg – art direction, design
- Suzy Kipp – stylist
- Bradley Warshaw – hair, make-up

== Chart performance ==
| Chart (2007) | Peak position |
|---|---|
| U.S. Billboard Top Country Albums | 72 |
