= River Cities' Reader =

- The 2007-02-21 front page of River Cities' Reader
- Type: Alternative newspaper
- Format: Tabloid
- Owner(s): Independent
- Publisher: Todd McGreevy
- Editor: Kathleen McCarthy
- Founded: 1993
- Headquarters: 532 West Third St; Davenport, IA 52801; United States
- Circulation: 19,700
- Price: Free
- Website: rcreader.com

The River Cities' Reader is an independently owned alternative newspaper based in Davenport, Iowa. The newspaper was founded in 1993 and is circulated throughout the Quad-Cities metropolitan area and outlying communities.

The Reader's format is tabloid size on newsprint; its masthead reads "business, politics, arts and culture".

== Content ==
Like many alternative weeklies, the Reader publishes feature-length, in-depth stories on a number of topics of interest, including:

- Local business and political issues, including investigative reporting and in-depth interviews with the people involved. The publishers often tout the publication as a "civic watchdog" for the community.
- Full-length interviews and in-depth articles with local and national artists, and other nationally renowned figures. Interview subjects have included former FEC chairman Bradley A. Smith actor/artist Kris Kristofferson and Ian Anderson leader of the rock band Jethro Tull.

Each issue of the Reader also contains a listing of arts and entertainment events taking place throughout the area, and provides critical reviews for regional art exhibitions, music concerts, and theatrical performances.

== History ==
The River Cities' Reader was first published in October 1993 as a monthly. In June 1995, the Reader began a weekly publishing schedule. It is published every Wednesday of the year and features special guides once per month.

The paper was founded by owners Kathleen McCarthy and Todd McGreevy who still remain active in its operation as editor and publisher, respectively. Jeff Ignatius, the publication's managing editor, has been with the Reader since 2000.

The website underwent an overhaul in June 2006 and now features local wikis for the community, an enhanced calendar, streaming video, and a more modern look.
