= All You Need Is Love (EP) =

EP by Nat Sakdatorn
- Released: April 25, 2008
- Recorded: 2007–2008
- Genre: Pop, R&B
- Length: 24:50
- Label: True Fantasia
- Producer: Kittikorn Penroj (executive), Banana Boat (executive), Chestha Yarosake

Nat Sakdatorn chronology
X-treme Army (2007)	All You Need Is Love (2008)

Singles from All You Need Is Love
- 1. "รักได้อีก" Released: April 10, 2008; 2. "คำสามคำ" Released: May 12, 2008

All You Need Is Love is the debut mini album by Thai singer-songwriter and the winner of True Visions' Academy Fantasia season 4, Nat Sakdatorn, as a solo artist. The official release date of this album is April 25, 2008. The album contains a special CD+VCD package (6 tracks and 6 karaoke videos).

== Production and songs ==
Sakdatorn revealed in คืนนี้ วันนั้น (on channel 5, aired on March 25, 2008) and Click Club (on True Inside, aired on March 30, 2008) that his debut album will contain 6 songs. The album is produced by Chestha Yarosake. The first single, รักได้อีก (Rak-Dai-Eek, meaning "I Can Love You More"), is an upbeat pop song with a funky disco arrangement. The song is written and composed by Yarosake (except for the English rap part, which is written by Sakdatorn himself) and is arranged by Banana Boat. Overall, this album has a pop feel mixed with Soul/R&B.

== Faixas ==
#	Title	Lyricist(s)	Composer(s)	Arranger(s)	Length
1.	"รักได้อีก"	Chestha Yarosake (Rap: Nat Sakdatorn)	Yarosake	Banana Boat	3:57
2.	"คำสามคำ"	Areeya Peerapongdecha	Sakdatorn	Jitrakorn Mongkoltham	4:38
3.	"แกะไม่ออก"	Yarosake	Banana Boat	Banana Boat	4:04
4.	"คนมีความรัก"	Yarosake	Yarosake	Banana Boat	4:25
5.	"The Way To Your Heart"	Sakdatorn	Sakdatorn	Banana Boat	3:53
6.	"เพลง(ไม่)พิเศษ"	Banana Boat	Banana Boat	Banana Boat	3:53
