= Noo Meter =

Thai singer-songwriter (born 1966)

Noo Meter หนู มิเตอร์
- Born: Sarangsan Ruangsri (Thai: สร่างศัลย์ เรืองศรี); 4 February 1966 (age 60); Lopburi Province, Thailand
- Genres: T-pop · phleng phuea chiwit · luk thung
- Occupation: Musician · singer · songwriter · businessman
- Instrument: Acoustic guitar · synthesizer · khlui · bass guitar · vocals
- Years active: 1980s–present
- Labels: RS Music (1980s–1994/2004–2018); Music Train (1994–2003); Independent (since 2018)

Sarangsan Ruangsri (born 4 February 1966), or stage name, Noo Meter (Thai: หนู มิเตอร์), is a Thai luk thung and T-pop musician, songwriter and singer. He was popular during the 1980s until the 2010s. He was rear of the success of many Thai singers from RS Music, and he also became popular through his songs including Behind Picture (ข้างหลังภาพ), I Still Await You At Sugarcane Field (ไร่อ้อยคอยรัก), The Caterpillar (หนอนผีเสื้อ), Hate Beauty Girl (เกลียดคนสวย), The Promise At The Night (สัญญาก่อนนอน), etc.

== Early life and career ==
He was born in Tha Luang District, Lopburi Province. He graduate from Chandrakasem Rajabhat University.

He played music since the late 1980s and produced many songs by RS Promotion (now RS Music), as well as the other record label. He worked alongside a wide variety of artists in Thailand, such as, Thierry Mekwattana, Thanapol Intharit, Raptor, Ruangsak Loychusak, Itti Balangura, etc. In 1994, he began to sing . He removed to Music Train and released the first album "Nirat Papun" (นิราศป่าปูน).

In 2004, he returned to RS Music and he was assigned to be the owner of ME-D Records, a subdivision of R-Siam, in division of RS Music. He became popular again after the release of his studio album "Luk Thung Meter" (ลูกทุ่งมิเตอร์), whose most popular song was, I Still Await You At Sugarcane Field written by Thongchai Lekkamphon. He was at the peak in 2008 by his studio album "Noo Meter Vol.3 : Love, Hove, Dream" (หนู มิเตอร์ 3 : ความรัก ความหวัง ความฝัน), which is known for the popular song, The Caterpillar. In addition, he also wrote the lyrics for many singers from R-Siam, such as, Baowee, Luang Kai, Koong Sutthirat, Karaket R-Siam, Santi Duangsawang, etc. He resign from R-Siam in 2018 with reason the contract was expired.

He won the honorable mention of "Phet Nai Phleng" awards in 2011 by song The Promise At The Night which was written and sung by himself.

His alias Guitar Meter and his stage name was first mentioned by Thanapol Intharit, with reason his spirit of the musician career.

== Discography ==
=== Studio album ===
R-Siam

- "Look Thung Meter" (2005–2007)
- "Noo Meter Vol.2 : May The Sky Protect The Stars" (วอนฟ้าห่มดาว) (2006)
- "Noo Meter Vol.3 : Love, Hope, Dream" (ความรัก ความหวีง ความฝัน) (2008)
- "Noo Meter Vol.4 : Familiar Person" (คนเดิมที่คุ้นเคย) (2009)
- "Noo Meter Vol.5 : More Than Love" (มากกว่าความรัก) (2010)
- "Noo Meter Vol.6 : The Bad Memorize From Chao Phraya" (เข็ดรักจากเจ้าพระยา) (2012)
