= Tannatonn Palakawong na Ayudhaya =

Thai musical artist

Tannatonn Palakawong na Ayudhaya ธรรพ์ณธร ปาลกะวงศ์ ณ อยุธยา
- Birth name: Tannatonn Palakawong na Ayudhaya
- Also known as: Au; Au Tannatonn
- Born: 10 November 1970 (age 54) Thailand
- Genres: Hard rock; blues rock; alternative rock; pop rock; pop
- Occupations: Singer; songwriter; musical director; stage actor
- Years active: 1995–present
- Labels: Music X (1995); RS Promotion (1999); Monster Music (2004); Agu; More Music

Tannatonn Palakawong na Ayudhaya (Thai: ธรรพ์ณธร ปาลกะวงศ์ ณ อยุธยา; born November 10, 1970) is a Thai singer, stage actor and musical director.

== Biography ==
=== Early life and career beginnings ===
Nicknamed "Au", his father was an ordnance officer who worked on TNT bombs. His name means "Music Keeper". (Note: It's a combination of the word "Tan", which means "gandharva" in Thai, and the word "tonn", which means "preservation".)

He started his career in the showbiz by taking part in his academy's stage plays, Ramkhamhaeng University (RU), including participating in SMG Singing Contest.

=== Solo artist ===
He rose to prominence with the release of the mini-album (EP) TNT (Note: It's a play on words besides referring to the TNT bombs involved in his father's work. It's also his monogram.) in 1995, produced by veteran Sutee Sangsareechon. His debut song was Kerd Pen Phuchai (เกิดเป็นผู้ชาย, "born to be a man"), an old song of Sangsareechon which is remixed in blues rock genre.

Other songs were popular during that time included Ron (ร้อน, "hot") and Ram La (ร่ำลา, "farewell").

Shortly before the release of the mini-album, he also sang for a Sprite TV commercial.

The following year, he released a full-studio album in the same title with 14 tracks.

In 1999, Tannatonn moved to a major label RS Promotion and released his second studio album titled Khon Tannatonn (คนธรรพ์ณธร). The best-known songs in this album were Huajai Kradard (หัวใจกระดาษ, "paper heart") and Mue Rak Man Huai (เมื่อรักมันห่วย, "when love sucks").

=== Musical style ===
Tannatonn initially had a hard rock, blues rock, and alternative rock sound throughout the mid-1990s before shifting into a more pop rock-based sound during the early 2000s. He is known as a singer with a powerful high-pitched voice, similar to Surush Tubwang of Hi-Rock.

=== Personal life ===
He married his girlfriend, Gornviwan "Kao" Sriphan, who was 16 years younger than him, on November 22, 2022.

== Discography ==
=== Studio albums ===
- TNT (EP) 1995
- TNT 1996
- Khon Tannatonn 1999
- Instinct 2003
- Tum Te 2005

=== Special albums ===
- Fire & Ice feat with Narumon "Fourth" Chivangkur 2000
- Saeng & Ngao feat with Narumon "Fourth" Chivangkur 2003

=== Compilation albums ===
- BORN TO BE 2000
- MASTERPIECE 2001
- Phu Chai Tannatonn 2003
- Tannatonn Tang Chiwit 2005

== Awards ==
=== Season Awards ===
- 1996 the 9th Season Awards Best Male Singer
- 1996 the 9th Season Awards Best Male Rocker
- 1999 the 12th Season Awards Best Song (Huajai Kradard)
- 1999 the 12th Season Awards Best Male Rocker
