= Fame (Thai band) =

Thai rock band

- Also known as: Pouk-Shirt (Collar Shirt)
- Origin: Bangkok, Thailand
- Genres: Rock glam metal funk rock blues pop rock
- Years active: 1987–1991, present
- Label: RS Promotion
- Members: Kraisorn Chamnanveth (Pi); Phattaranatt Raditjirakiat (past name : Nantanatt Chanindeth) (Nut, Nutty); Thana Aksornphan (Aom); Krit (past name : Anusorn) Makaew (Tum, Ma); Soravith Buasri (Ton); Charlie Salee
- Past members: Korkiat (past name : Phinyo) Jareonsatitpong (Nueng) (death 2017) Fame's Drummer on the first album Khon-Mai-Khoei
- Website: www.facebook.com/famebandthailand

Fame (Thai: เฟม) were a Thai rock band famous and popular in the 1980s–1990s.

== History ==
The band was formed in 1987 by Kraisorn Chamnanveth (Pi), Korkiat (past name: Phinyo) Jareonsatitpong (Nueng), Phattaranatt Raditjirakiat (past name: Nantanatt Chanindeth) (Nut, Nutty), Krit (past name: Anusorn) Makaew (Tum, Ma). This band split from High-school band (this band had Joe-Kong-John from Nuvo). They always played music in Drinken Pub, called as Pouk-Shirt (Collar Shirt).

One day, Nut the one of Pouk Shirt in that time, he had big chance to play role in music video of Rainbow titled Jai-Deow and he presented the band to Itti Balangura, next time Itti decided to watch the band play in Drinken Pub. After he watched this band, the next day Itti invited Nut and the band to make a contract with RS Promotion.

In next time they wanted to find the new member to join the band, they watched Soravith Buasri (Ton) and Thana Aksornphan (Aom) play instrument, they decided to add these new members Ton and Aom.

In that time, they chose the new name of band 6 Khon (six persons) called from the team in RS label, so anyway, they built the name of band as Fame.

They were successful with Khon-Mai-Khoei album and Ai-Tua-Yoong album, they have big concert with Itti Balangura and Arisman Phongruengrong, it was called FAI in Sor-Wor-Por ground @Ramkhamhaeng University and they had big chance to play music with TUBE but Typhoon Gay happened in Thailand, they had to cancel it. Between then and the third album they had a problem with RS label, they decided to cancel the third album and the band.

In their second album they changed Nueng-Phinyo Drummer of Fame as Charlie Salee (after Fame, Charlie joined fly band).

They had a reunion of the band on 15 June 2019, its 30th anniversary of the formation of the band, they made a merit with Phrabhatnamphu Temple for HIV's poor patients in the name of concert 30 Pee Wong Fame Rak Kan Jing Mai Ting Kan.

== Members ==
=== Current members ===
- Pi–Kraisorn Chamnanveth (ปี่: ไกรสร ชำนาญเวทย์): Lead vocals and Guitar
- Nut or Nutty–Phattaranatt Raditjirakiat (นัท,นัตตี: ภัทรณัฏฐ์ รดิศจิรเกียรติ) (past name: Nantanatt Chanindet: นัยณัฏฐ์ ชนินทร์เดช): Lead vocals and Keyboards
- Aom–Thana Aksornphan (ออม: ธนา อักษรพันธ์): Guitar
- Ton–Soravith Buasri (ต้น: สรวิทย์ บัวศรี): Keyboards
- Tum or Ma-Krit(past name : Anusorn:อนุสรณ์) Makaew (ตั้ม,ม้า:กฤช ม้าแก้ว) Bass
- Charlie Salee (ชาลี สาลี่): Drums

=== Past members ===
- Korkiat (past name : Phinyo:ภิญโญ) Jareonsatitpong (Nueng) (death 2017) (หนึ่ง: ก่อเกียรติ เจริญสถิตย์พงศ์): Drums (only first studio album)

== Discography ==
Studio albums

- คนไม่เคย, I never have yet the love (Khon Mai Khoei; 1989)
- ไอ้ตัวยุ่ง, Troublesome object (or money) (Ai Tua Yoong; 1991)

=== Single ===
- จิ้งจกทัก, Jing Jok Tak (House Gecko Call; 2020)
