= List of pop rock bands =

This is a list of pop rock bands. Pop rock is a genre of rock music and pop music developed in the late 1950s.

- ABBA
- ADA Band
- A-ha
- Aphaca (band)
- Aegis (band)
- Bele Vrane
- BGYO
- Bini (group)
- Bon Jovi
- Brothers Grim (band)
- Bunkface
- Coldplay
- C Real (Greek band)
- Diabolique (band)
- d'Masiv
- Double (band)
- Doug and the Slugs
- Estelares
- Fame (Thai band)
- Fleetwood Mac
- Giant Rooks
- GNR (band)
- Holograf
- The Hounds (band)
- IMT Smile
- Iné Kafe
- Insomniacks
- Kaolin (band)
- Kino (band)
- Kudai
- Labanoon
- Laundry Day (band)
- M2M (band)
- Machiavel (band)
- Manic Street Preachers
- Micro (Thai band)
- The Monkees
- Måneskin
- Nanook (band)
- La Oreja de Van Gogh
- Orleans (band)
- Queen (band)
- R5 (band)
- RBD
- Rock Bones
- Ryokuoushoku Shakai
- The Script
- Stadio
- Stars Go Dim
- Svyazi
- Tiktak
- Tokio Hotel
- Traveling Wilburys
- Two (Thai duo)
- Ungu
- Unheilig
- Vanilla Ninja
- Vesyolye Rebyata
- Vunk
- Yuzu (band)
- ZEM

== See also ==
- List of emo pop bands
- List of jangle pop bands
- List of pop-punk bands
- List of power pop artists and songs
