= Grammy RS Concerts =

- series concerts tour by the singers from GMM Grammy and RS Group
- Venue: Impact, Muang Thong Thani
- Start date: 1st time: 29 July 2023
- Producer: Across The Universe Project by GMM Music (subsidiary of GMM Grammy) and RS Music (subsidiary of RS Group)

Grammy RS Concerts (Thai: แกรมมี่ อาร์เอส คอนเสิร์ตส) it is the first series of concerts organized jointly by two Thai music label companies, GMM Grammy and RS Group which invested in a joint venture, Across the Universe. Later both GMM Grammy and RS Group gave their own subsidiaries that directly operated the music business, namely GMM Music and RS Music is instead a joint venture partner in this joint venture and change the name of the joint venture to "Across the Universe Project", with a plan to hold concerts continuously for a period of 3 years from 2023 to 2025, and every concert will be performed at Impact, Muang Thong Thani.

The collaboration developed through discussions involving Phawit Chitrakorn, chief executive officer of GMM Music, and Wittawat Wetchabutsakorn, chief financial officer of RS. Executives from the two companies had discussed a possible collaboration for approximately five years, but considered the timing unsuitable at the time. After the COVID-19 situation in Thailand eased and RS returned to the music business, the companies resumed discussions and eventually reached a cooperation agreement.

Later on March 21, 2023, Yutthana Boon-om, Senior Deputy Managing Director Show business Line of GMM Grammy, concert organizer and former famous DJ posted it on his personal social media channels and specify the important message that "There will be a joint concert between GMM Grammy and RS within this year". Which is considered a collaboration between GMM Grammy and RS for the first time became a phenomenon that created interest in the Thai music industry. And later, both GMM Grammy and RS registered to establish a joint venture under the name Across The Universe to organize this particular concert. Both companies hold shares in the joint venture with the same proportion of 50% each.

Later on March 28, 2023, GMM Grammy and RS, on behalf of the joint venture Across the Universe, jointly held a press conference to launch a concert series called Grammy RS Concerts officially at Aksara Theatre, King Power.

== List of concerts ==
- 90’s Versary (July 2023)
- 2k Celebrations (September 2023)
- HIT100 (October 2023)
- HIT100 Vol.2 (May 2024)
- Dance Arena (October 2024)
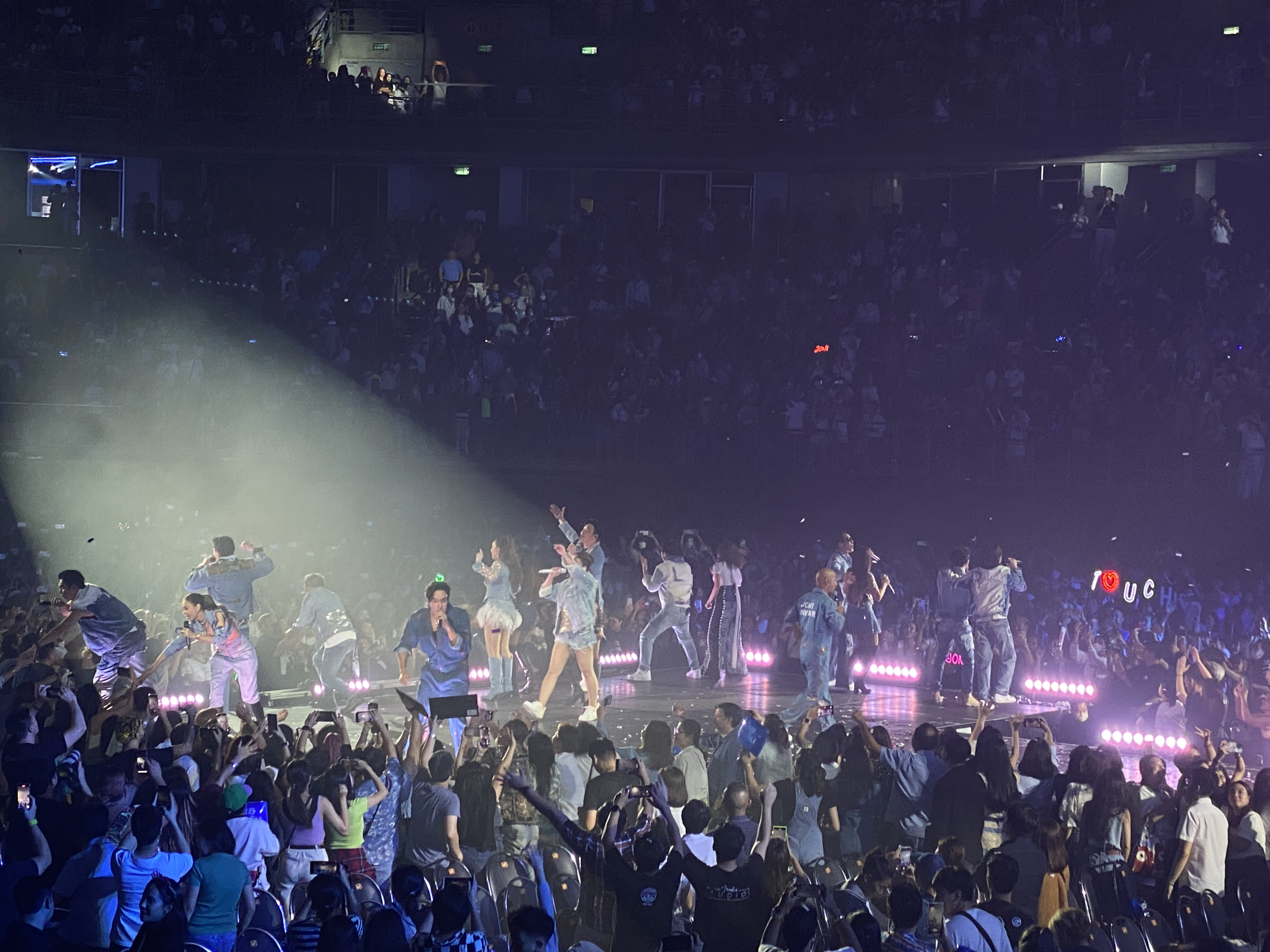
90’s Versary concert

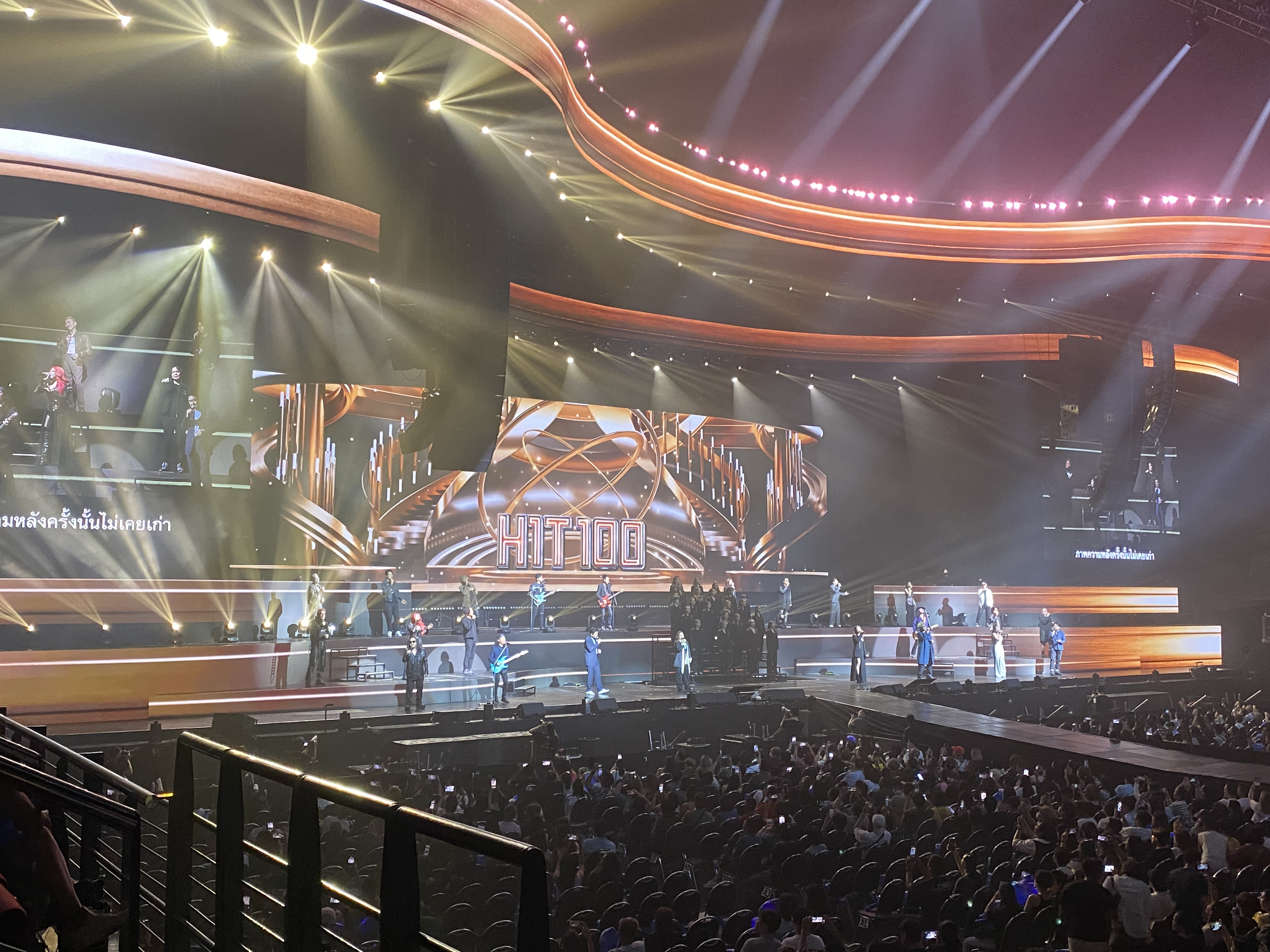
HIT100 Vol.2 concert
