= Ronnachai Thomyapariwat =

- Born: August 17, 1964
- Died: October 16, 2021 (aged 57) Chulalongkorn Hospital Bangkok Thailand
- Occupation: singer • musician • songwriter
- Years active: 1983–2021
- Labels: RS Promotion; Grammy Gold
- Spouse: Paphasara Thomyapariwat

Ronnachai Thomyapariwat, better known as Aod Keereeboon (August 17, 1964 –October 16, 2021) was a Thai singer, musician, actor, and songwriter. He was the former lead singer and leader of Keereeboon, the famous Thai string combo since 1983 has a famous song "Wait for the Day I Love You" (Thai: รอวันฉันรักเธอ) with 6 albums in the band's name He graduated with a bachelor's degree from the Faculty of Economics, Chulalongkorn University.

== Biography ==
During his time with the Keereeboon, Ronnachai joined a male and female duo singing Luk krung songs in the albums Ruam Dao, Phop Dao, and Nopphakao since 1984.

Ronnachai released dozens of solo albums after the band broke up and only starred in one movie, Love of Mr. Chui, in 1989.

Ronnachai was the owner of a music school for learning "Keereeboon Genius Music"

He was married to Egg Paphasara Thomyapariwat and they had one daughter named Chamonwan Thomyapariwat.

Ronnachai went on the show The Mask Singer, Season 4 competing in Group C, nicknamed Coconut Mask, singing the song Farmer and Cobra, where he lost to the Wizard Mask.

In 2019, he co-starred in the drama series Fleet of Time on GMM 25, playing the role of Win's father.

== Death ==
Ronnachai died of brain cancer at 10:15 p.m. on October 16, 2021, at the age of 57.

His Majesty the King Vajiralongkorn graciously granted a special cremation on December 19, 2021, at Wat Khemmaphirataram Ratchaworawihan, Nonthaburi province
