= Arisman Pongruangrong =

- Born: Sakda Pongruangrong; 8 January 1964 (age 62); Ban Pong District, Ratchaburi Province
- Other name: Halls-shaped singer
- Education: Faculty of Law, Sripathum University; Faculty of Political Science, Chulalongkorn University
- Occupations: singer; politician
- Years active: 1989–1999 (musician); 1995–present (Political work)
- Title: Advisor to the Minister of Culture; Secretary to the Minister of Social Development and Human Security; Advisor to the Minister of Commerce; Advisor to the Speaker of the House of Representatives
- Political party: Phalang Dharma (1995–1998); Thai Rak Thai (1998–2007); People's Power (2007–2008); Pheu Thai (2008–2010)
- Movement: United Front for Democracy Against Dictatorship (UDD)
- Musical career
- Genres: Pop, luk thung, dance, luk grung, Rock, blues, acoustic, folk
- Instrument: singing
- Label: RS Promotion

Arisman Pongruangrong (Thai: อริสมันต์ พงศ์เรืองรอง, RTGS: Aritsaman Phongrueangrong), nicknamed Keer (Thai: กีร์), is a Thai singer and politician, and a former member of the House of Representatives for Bangkok. He was once a member of the United Front of Democracy Against Dictatorship (UDD), and is a former advisor to the Minister of Culture, Secretary to the Minister of Social Development and Human Security, advisor to the Minister of Commerce, advisor to the Speaker of the House of Representatives, and a former leader of the UDD.

== Early life and entertainment career ==
Arisman was born into a Hindu family in Ban Pong, Ratchaburi, in western Thailand. His parents were both likay performers. When he first came to Bangkok, he made a living by selling cheap jeans outside Ramkhamhaeng University and at Victory Monument.

He entered the entertainment industry with the support of Itti Balangura, releasing his debut album, Khwaam Mai Khong Phu Chai Khon Nueng (ความหมายของผู้ชายคนหนึ่ง; "The Meaning of One Man"), in 1989 under RS Promotion. The album became an immediate success and propelled him to fame. He subsequently released numerous albums, including studio albums, special projects, and compilation albums throughout the late 1980s and the 1990s. His music was primarily pop, influenced by the Mandopop and Cantopop sounds that were popular at the time. One of his most distinctive features was his unusual, highly individualistic songwriting style, with lyrics that he wrote himself. Some of his songs reflected on his difficult circumstances, particularly being born poor and therefore failing to win the love of the woman he cared for. These themes were conveyed through his deep, low-pitched voice, delivered with a distinctive throatiness, as though he were singing with a Halls candy in his mouth.

Itti Balangura served as the producer for all of his albums. Most of his best-known songs were slow-tempo ballads, including Mai Jiam (ไม่เจียม; "Knowing One's Place"), Thoe Lam Iang (เธอลำเอียง; "You're Biased"), Tamni Jai (ตำหนิใจ; "Blaming My Heart"), Jai Mai Dan Pho (ใจไม่ด้านพอ; "My Heart Isn't Tough Enough"), Yom Yok Thong (ยอมยกธง; "I Give Up"), Wethi Ni Mai Mi Phi Liang (เวทีนี้ไม่มีพี่เลี้ยง; "There's No Mentor on This Stage"), Fah Luem (ฟ้าลืม; "Heaven Has Forgotten"), Khon Khang Lang (คนข้างหลัง; "The One Behind You"), Tat Tan (ทัดทาน; "Dissuade"), Ko Kong Sai (ก่อกองทราย; "Building a Sandcastle"), Kara Kasang (คาราคาซัง; "Unfinished"), Hua Jai Pramat (หัวใจประมาท; "Reckless Heart"), and Rak Thoe Samoe Jai (รักเธอเสมอใจ; "Always Loving You in My Heart"), among others.

While he was still at the height of his fame and popularity, his younger brother, Archakrin "Pu" Pongruangrong, also released an album in 1991 under the same record label. His music followed a style similar to that of his brother, and Arisman wrote several songs for the album. However, he did not achieve the same level of success.

After 1997, Arisman popularity began to decline, while the direction of the Thai music industry was also changing. He subsequently began shifting toward luk thung (Thai country music) and became increasingly involved in politics.

== Political role ==
He took part in the demonstrations against the military-backed authoritarian government during the May 1992 protests, known as Black May. He was arguably one of the very few, if not the only, Thai pop singers of the time to have participated in the demonstrations. Arisman subsequently joined the Phalang Dharma Party during the period when Thaksin Shinawatra was its leader. He ran as a parliamentary candidate in the Bangkok constituencies covering Bangkok Noi, Taling Chan, and Bang Phlat in the 1995 general election, but was unsuccessful in the following 1996 general election. He nevertheless remained politically aligned with Thaksin Shinawatra from that point onward.

Arisman later became one of the leaders of the United Front for Democracy Against Dictatorship (UDD), commonly known as the Red Shirt movement, and played a major role in the bloody protests of 2009 and, most significantly, the 2010 political crisis.
