= Santi Duangsawang =

- สันติ ดวงสว่าง
- Born: Charae Phuthong; 10 January 1968; Phichit, Thailand
- Died: 4 November 2016 (aged 48); Samut Prakan, Thailand
- Occupation: Singer • Actor
- Children: 1
- Musical career
- Genres: Luk thung
- Instrument: Vocal
- Years active: 1983-2016
- Labels: RS Music

Chare Phuthong (Thai: จเร ภู่ทอง) or stage name Santi Duangsawang (Thai: สันติ ดวงสว่าง) was a Thai luk thung singer, his popular music includes "Chup Mai Wan" (จูบไม่หวาน), "Thone Kham Saban" (ถอนคำสาบาน), "Chot Mai Puen Namta" (จดหมายเปื้อนน้ำตา) and "Luk Thung Khon Yak" (ลูกทุ่งคนยาก).

== Early life and career ==
He was born on January 10, 1968, in Sak Lek district, Phichit province. In his young years, he contested many contests on stage and won more, until Aed Tewada saw his prominence. Aed induced him to start on stage in 1985 and recorded first song title Dek Khai Riang Ber but failed to find fame. In 1986, he contested music contest "Look thung sip thit" and registered as artist in RS Public Company Limited. He came to fame with his album Kiss No Fun (Thai: จูบไม่หวาน, Chup Mai Wan) in 1988. He retired RS in 2008 and founded record label by himself called Ruangkhaw Record.

His other popular songs include Fark Jai Sai Krathong, Rok Pralad, Thorn Kham Saban, Rak Nee Mee Kam, Namgloei Nangluem, etc.

He died from diabetes and kidney failure on November 4, 2016, in Samut Songkhram province, aged 48.

== Discography ==
=== Popular Music ===
- Kiss no fun. (จูบไม่หวาน)
- Change oaths. (ถอนคำสาบาน)
- "Letter wet with tear." (จดหมายเปื้อนน้ำตา)
- Poor singer. (ลูกทุ่งคนยาก)
- This love is serious. (รักนี้มีกรรม)
- Took My Heart Into Krathong (ฝากใจใส่กระทง)
- The Poison Love At Phitsanulok (พิษรักพิษณุโลก)
- The cocky girl. (นางลอย นางลืม)
