= Baowee =

Thai singer and military officer (born 1974)

- บ่าววี
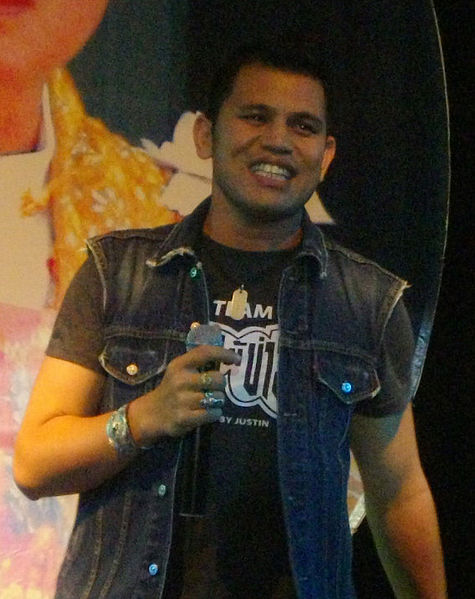
- Baowee in 2009
- Born: Weerayut Narncha (Thai: วีรยุทธิ์ นานช้า); 29 January 1974 (age 52); Trang Province, Thailand
- Occupations: Singer; Songwriter; Musicians; Military officer
- Musical career
- Genres: T-Rock; Phleng phuea chiwit; Luk thung
- Instrument: Vocal
- Years active: 2000s–present
- Label: R-Siam (RS Music) (2006-2021)

Military service
- Allegiance: Thailand
- Branch/service: Royal Thai Air Force
- Years of service: 1993–present
- Rank: Flying Officer

Flying Officer Weerayut Narncha (born 21 January 1974) or stage name, Baowee (Thai: บ่าววี) is a Thai luk thung singer and military officer from southern Thailand. He started to popular in late 2000s with many popular songs, such as, Leave My Hope To The Sky (ฝากฟ้า), The Log and Yatcht (ขอนไม้กับเรือ), Nonsense (ไม่มีประโยชน์), Hopeless (ห่วงหาย), The Fighter Heart (หัวใจนักสู้), etc.

== Early life and career ==
He was born in Trang Province, he have a younger brothers. He love to traditional music since his young. He graduated from the Faculty of Politics, Ramkhamhaeng University.

When he was 19 years old, he began to service in Royal Thai Air Force, and he started on stage since early 2000s by got a job for singing in pubs at night.

=== 2005-2009 : His peak era on stage ===
In 2005, he sent his demo tape to audition for ME-D Records, a former Thai record label which owned by R-Siam, the division of RS Music, after that for a month later, a Thai musicians and owner ME-D records Noo Meter apporved his demo tape and he attitue to artist of ME-D records in the same year. His first album was released in November 2005 and success with singles Sincere Without Deception (จริงใจ ไม่ลอกอ), Miss The Wind of Kite (คิดถึงลมว่าว) and Leave My Hope To The Sky. He was at the peak of his stage life in 2007 with his second album, which included the popular song, such as, Neighbour (คนใกล้บ้าน), Don't Standoffish (เล่นตัว) and The Log and Yatcht. He was popular again in 2009 by his single Nonsense which a part of his fourth album and written by Noo Meter.

=== 2021 : Resign from R-Siam and current ===
He was an artist for R-Siam until 2021. During this time, he also continued to recorded popular songs such as Every My Swear For You (ทุกหยาดเหงื่อเพื่อเธอ), The More You Shake The More Yummy (ยิ่งเหย่า ยิ่งหรอย), Hopeless, The Knot of Death The Heart is Tied (เชือกผูกตายใจผูกพัน), etc. His contract with R-Siam expired in 2021 and he resigned. He started to independence singer and he released his single The Fighter Heart in 2022.

== Personal life ==
He have a sweetheart since 2001, but not married and not have a children. He is supporter of a Thai boxer Worawut Baowee-jeans. In addition, he owned his café Kurotee Chachak since 2019.

He expressed opposition against 2020 Thai protests and also expressed support for the Thai monarchy.

== Discography ==
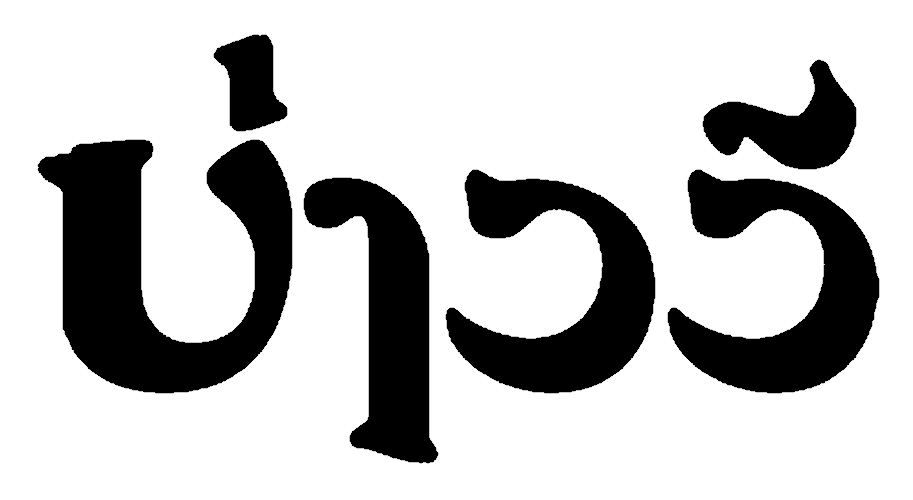
His personal text logo

=== Studio albums ===
ME-D Records

- "Baowee Vol.1" (2005)

Rsiam

- "Baowee Vol.2" (2007)
- "Baowee Vol.3" (early 2009)
- "Baowee Vol.4" (late 2009)
- "Baowee Vol.5" (2011)
- "Baowee Vol.6" (2012)
- "Baowee Vol.7" (2014)

=== Single ===
Rsiam

- "The Fake Love" (รักลวงโลก) (2014)

Independence

- "The Fighter Heart" (หัวใจนักสู้) (2022)
