= Keereeboon =

Thai pop music band

- Origin: Bangkok, Thailand
- Genre: Pop
- Years active: 1983–1987, 2010
- Label: RS Sound
- Past members: Ronnachai Thomyapariwat; Arthit Namboonsi; Paisal Anyathana; Krairit Paesuwan; Pipat Nilprapa; Chaiyapol Imduaysook

Keereeboon also spelled Kiriboon (Thai: คีรีบูน) were a Thai pop band active in the 1980s. The name Keereeboon means "canary", a small yellow bird dubbed as "king of songsters". The band was affiliated RS Sound and released their first album around 1983, becoming known for their melodic ballads and stage performances.

== History ==
Keereeboon had a total of six members, the key member being Ronnachai Thomyapariwat, more widely known by nickname Ord, the lead vocalist. They were considered one of the 1980s teen idols, contemporary with bands in the same genre like Fruity and Rainbow.

The first album was released in 1983. Plook Rak (ปลูกรัก, "plant a love"), a low-tempo song with a tango rhythm re-arranged from an old song of the same title by Suntaraporn. It became the first song to make Keereeboon widely known from their second album in 1984.

Their other popular songs include Ro Wan Can Rak Ter (รอวันฉันรักเธอ, "waiting for the day that I love you"), Adeed Rak Yam Yen (อดีตรักยามเย็น, "love at sundown in the past"), Dek Kampra (เด็กกำพร้า, "orphan"), etc.

After releasing the fifth album in 1987, Keereeboon finally announced the end of the band.

In 2010, they reunited with a major concert at Impact Arena, Muang Thong Thani, the band's first performance in 26 years.

On Saturday night, October 16, 2021, Ord died of brain cancer at the age of 57.

== Members ==
- Ronnachai Thomyapariwat: lead vocals, guitar
- Arthit Namboonsi: backing vocals, guitar
- Paisal Anyathana: keyboards, guitar, backing vocals
- Krairit Paesuwan: bass
- Pipat Nilprapa: keyboards
- Chaiyapol Imduaysook: drums
