= Thanapol Intharit =

- ธนพล อินทฤทธิ์
- Born: Thanapol Intharit; November 18, 1964 (age 61); Kalasin, Thailand
- Other names: Suea; Suea Thanapol
- Children: 3, including Thanissa "Phleng" Intharit (a member of girl group GAIA)
- Musical career
- Genres: Rock; folk rock; Phleng Thai sakon; Luk Thung; Rhythm and Blues; phleng phuea chiwit
- Occupations: Singer-songwriter; producer
- Instruments: Vocals; guitar; harmonica
- Labels: RS; Grammy

Thanapol Intharit (or spelt Thanapon Intharit; RTGS: Thanaphon Intharit; Thai: ธนพล อินทฤทธิ์; nickname: Suea (เสือ)) is a Thai singer, musician, producer and songwriter.

== Life and career ==
He was born in Kalasin province and graduated from Rajamangala Institute of Technology Isan Campus (Rajamangala University of Technology Isan) and Ramkhamhaeng University. He started as a musician by forming a band with friends and relatives in the name Chiang Nuea (เฉียงเหนือ) who played as a backup band across the Isan region (northeast region).

Later, he joined the RS Promotion as an art director and costume designer including songwriting, especially Keb Tawan (เก็บตะวัน) in 1988, that is the song that made famous for Itti Balangura.

In 1994, he had the opportunity to release his first studio album entitled T Kong Suea (ทีของเสือ), which was immediately successful. There are many popular songs such as Rak Kong Yang Mai Por (รักคงยังไม่พอ), Chiwit Nee (ชีวิตหนี้) and 18 Fhon (18 ฝน) and he participated in Short Charge Shock Rock Concert: Suea Ampan at the Thai Army Sports Stadium with Surush "Pe" Tubwang (Pe Hi-Rock) and Phisut "Jeab" Sabvijit, and joined again in Shot Charge Shock Rock Concert: Lek Kumram with SMF in 1995 at the same place.

In 1998, Intharit moved to Grammy Entertainment and released his second studio album Jai Dee...Su Suea (ใจดี...สู้เสือ) until 2012, he became a free label musician.

== Discography ==
=== Studio albums ===
T Kong Suea (ทีของเสือ) (released on June 7, 1994)
No.	Title	Length
1.	"รักคงยังไม่พอ"	3:56
2.	"กระดาษห่อไฟ"	4:30
3.	"ชีวิตหนี้"	4:18
4.	"อยากกลับบ้าน"	4:21
5.	"คิดมากไปหรือเปล่า"	4:26
6.	"เรือลำหนึ่ง"	4:44
7.	"เก็บไว้นาน...นาน"	4:42
8.	"18 ฝน"	4:43
9.	"ยังได้อยู่"	4:19
10.	"ขวางโลก"	4:29
11.	"เพี้ยน"	4:08
12.	"ดอกไม้ข้างทาง"	3:21
Total length:		51:57

- Jai Dee...Su Suea (ใจดี...สู้เสือ) 1998
- Khon Chai Chiwit (คนใช้ชีวิต) 2000
- Chong Wang Nai Hua Jai (ช่องว่างในหัวใจ) 2003
- Rak Khon Thai (รักคนไทย) 2005
- Tawee Khun (ทวีคูณ) 2008

=== Singles ===
- Kaewta Duangjai (แก้วตาดวงใจ) (ost. of Kaewta Duangjai; 1991)
- Kadee Daeng (คดีแดง) (ost. of Kadee Daeng; 1991)
- Sia Khon (เสียคน) (ost. of Nam Pu; 2002)
- Ton Thun (ต้นทุน) (ost. of Sam Hua Jai Soem Yai Lek; 2014)
