= Two (Thai duo) =

Thai musical duo

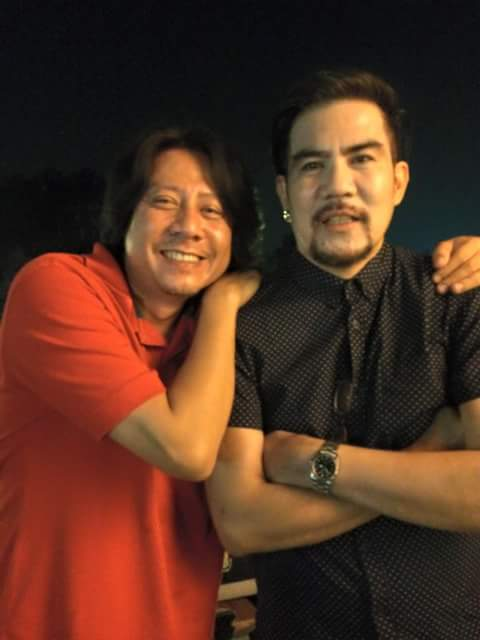
- Tong and Tor in 2018

Background information
- Origin: Bangkok, Thailand
- Genres: Pop; dance-pop; pop-Rock; alternative
- Years active: 1991–1996, 2005, 2016–present
- Labels: RS Promotion; (1991–1996); GMM Grammy (2005); Unlabel (in the name of Fly2play Project)–present
- Members: Tor-Sahaphap Weerakamin
- Past members: Tong-Suraphan Jamlongkul (death 2026)

Two, also named Tor&Tong, is a Thai musical duo. It came to popularity in the 1990s under RS Promotion. They are the first duo under the RS label. The duo consists of "Tor" (Sahaphap Weerakamin) and "Tong" (Suraphan Jamlongkul). Their albums Rak Luan Luan Tae Kwan Na, Deng Dai Tah Mai Dieng, and Double Two each sold over a million copies.

== History ==
Tor and Tong both attended Suankularb Wittayalai School, where they met. Tor began his career modelling for magazines whereas Tong worked in backing sound for RS. They had a twin look, emphasized by their long hair. As with the Korean duo band Lift&Oil, they wore short, brightly colored T-shirts.

The pair debuted in 1991 with their album Rak Luan Luan Tae Kwan Na. Together, their work Rak Luan Luan Tae Kwan Na, Deng Dai Tah Mai Dieng and Double Two exceeded one million downloads. With Double Two, the band changed their style from Pop-Dance to Pop-Rock and changed their look. They had one special album Two Outdoor. They tried switching to alternative music, following the trend that was popular at the time, but were unsuccessful. However, the song "Ther Mai Khoei Tai" from the album Deng Dai Tah Mai Dieng in 1992 was heavily criticized for allegedly imitating X Japan's "Say Anything."

Tong retired From RS Label to work with Itti Balangura. They split the duo. In 2006 they returned and made the album one man story, Tor sang Nueay. Tong sang Samnuek..D, Cheewitmai, Khonkeirak and bed time.

They reunited again in 2016 and released a single "We Are Thailand."

Suraphan "Tong" Jamlongkul passed away on the morning of September 28, 2026, at the age of 56, after undergoing surgery and receiving treatment for nasopharyngeal cancer at Bhumibol Adulyadej Hospital.

== Members ==
- Tor-Sahaphap Weerakamin (TH : ต่อ-สหภาพ วีระฆามินทร์)
- Tong-Suraphan Jamlongkul (TH : ต๋อง-สุรพันธ์ จำลองกุล) death 2026

== Discography ==
=== Studio albums ===
- Rak Luan Luan Tae Kwan Na 1991
- Deng Dai Tah Mai Dieng 1992
- Two Double 1995

=== Compilation albums ===
- RS Unplugged 1994
- Two Outdoor 1996
- One Man Story 2005

=== Single ===
- We Are Thailand 2016 (in the name of fly2play project)

=== Concert ===
- Karom Pehn Tor Rooplor Pehn Tong 1991 MBK Hall
- Two Tid Mun 1993 MBK Hall

Jam Concert

- RS Unplugged Concert 1994 MBK Hall
- RS. Meeting Concert Nok Krueng Bab Zaa (TH:นอกเครื่องแบบ...ซ่า) (7 Oct 1995) MBK Hall
- RS. Freshy Jam Concert (11 Sep 1995) Thai Army Sports Stadium
- Live Action Jump Concert 1996 MBK Hall
