= Inca (Thai band) =

Thai rock band

- Origin: Bangkok, Thailand
- Genres: Folk rock; country rock
- Years active: 1991–1993, 2003, 2006
- Labels: Grammy; Giraffe; Genie
- Spinoffs: Go-gang; Wolfpack
- Members: Sakda Pattasima; Jaruwat Wisetsombat; Nol Singholaka; Piti Duangpikul; Worawit Pikulthong; Worabut Tiaprasert
- Past members: Ronnapop Akarat

Inca (Thai: อินคา) were a Thai rock band that was active in the early and mid-1990's.

== History ==
The group was planted in 1989 by musicians Sakda "Da" Pattasima, Jaruwat "Aom" Wisetsombat, and Nol "Orr" Singholaka. Their name Inca comes from the once prosperous Inca Empire in South America, because they all had long flowing hair like the Inca people.

In 1991, the band released their first studio album under the major label Grammy Entertainment, with sales of over a million cassette tapes.

In 1993, with only three remaining members Inca has released a second studio album under the same label.

The band's popular songs are folk rock and country rock included Mak Game Ni (หมากเกมนี้, "chess in this game"), Ying Klai Ying Jeb (ยิ่งใกล้ยิ่งเจ็บ, "the closer it hurts"), Kho Ruem Mai (ขอเริ่มใหม่, "let's start over"), Tongkan Duan (ต้องการด่วน, "urgent need"), Mot Laew Mot Loei (หมดแล้วหมดเลย, "it's all gone").

After that, the members split up to form a new band, such as Go-gang in 1994 and Wolfpack in 1996.

In 2003, they reunited with a big concert and perform concerts all over the country.

In 2006, the third studio album was released after a 14-year hiatus.

== Members ==
=== Current members ===
- Sakda "Da" Pattasima: lead singer, lead guitar, and band leader
- Jaruwat "Aom" Wisetsombat: lead singer, guitar
- Nol "Orr" Singholaka: lead singer, drums
- Piti "Pop" Duangpikul: bass guitar
- Worawit "Boy" Pikulthong: lead singer, keyboards
- Worabut "Tom" Tiaprasert: lead guitar

=== Past members ===
- Ronnapop "Toei" Akarat: lead guitar

== Discography ==
=== Studio albums ===
- Khon La Fun (คนล่าฝัน, "dream hunter") 1991
- Tam Roi Tawan (ตามรอยตะวัน, "follow the sun") 1993
- INCA Arrival 2006

=== Compilation albums ===
- Replay 2003
- The Very Best Of Inca 2006
