= Svyazi =

Russian pop punk band

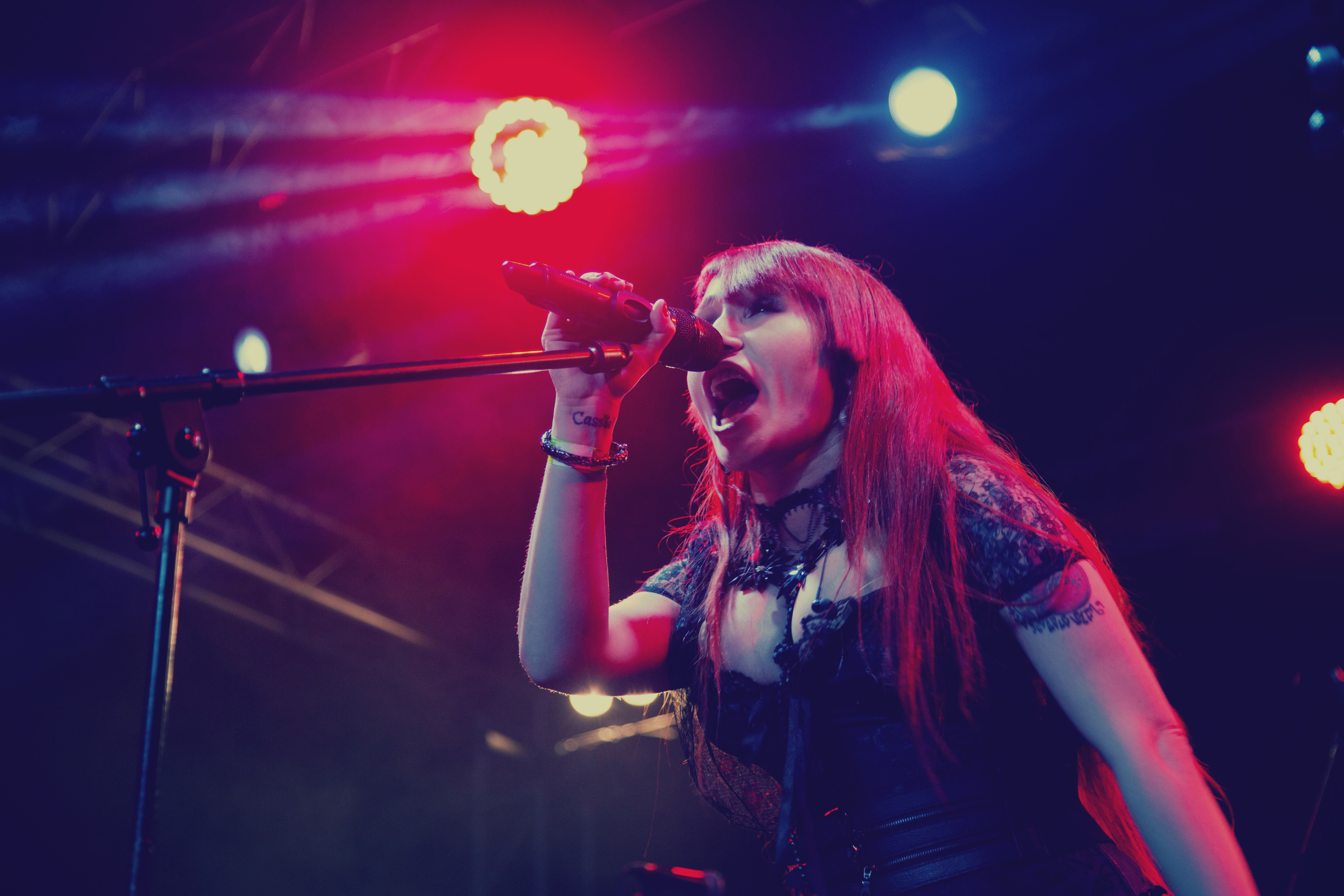

Background information
- Origin: Moscow, Russia
- Genres: Rock, alternative rock, pop rock, punk rock
- Years active: 2013–present
- Labels: Soyuz Music (Союз Мьюзик)
- Members: Yuki Kislyak
- Website: svyazitour.ru

Svyazi (Russian: Cвя́зи, Группа Связи) a Russian pop punk band founded by singer, writer and musician Yuki Kislyak (Юки Кисляк).

== Biography ==
The group "Svyazi" (Группа Связи) was born in 2013 with the debut video "Umeret', kak v romane". In 2014–2015, “Svyazi” became nominees for the annual national award “Strana”. After that, the group released their debut album and presented it in Moscow, and the clips of the group "Svyazi" appeared on the air of the federal music channels. In 2017, "Svyazi" Group became a laureate of the "New Energy" international festival. In February 2019, the group released a new single "Sex" (Секс) which quickly became popular on the internet. At the moment, the Svyazi group, together with the music label Soyuz Music, is working on the release of a new album called "Imya moyo" (Имя моё), which is scheduled for release on January 31, 2020.

== Discography ==
- 2015 - Жажда (ZHazhda, Thirst) - album
- 2016 - Бонни и Клайд (Bonni i Klajd, Bonnie and Сlyde) - single
- 2019 - Секс (Seks, Sex) - single
- 2020 - Имя моё (Imya moyo, My name) - album

== Clippiography ==
- 2013 - Умереть, как в романе (Umeret', kak v romane, To die, as in the novel)
- 2014 - Игра (Igra, A game)
- 2015 - Рассветы (Rassvety, Sunrises)
- 2016 - Бонни и Клайд (Bonni i Klajd, Bonnie and Сlyde)
