= Itti Balangura =

Thai singer and musician (1955–2004)

- Born: Ekachaiwat Balangura (เอกชัยวัฒน์ พลางกูร); 30 January 1955; Bangkok Noi, Bangkok, Thailand
- Died: 11 November 2004 (aged 49) Bangkok, Thailand
- Genres: Progressive rock; Rock; sentimental ballad; pop rock; soft rock; pop
- Occupations: Singer; musician; record producer
- Instruments: Vocals; guitar; piano
- Years active: 1981–2004
- Labels: RS; Music On Earth
- Spouse: Chanda Liyawanich

Itti Balangura (Thai: อิทธิ พลางกูร; born Ekachaiwat Balangura; 30 January 1955 – 11 November 2004) was a Thai singer, musician and record producer. Known as "Guitar Ballad".

== Career ==
Balangura began his career with The Bless, a band with many future famed musicians as members, such as Surasee Ithikul and Paiboonkiat Kiewkaew. His favorite artists included the Beatles, Cream, and Eric Clapton. At that time he was still an architecture student at King Mongkut's Institute of Technology Ladkrabang.

After 8 years with the band, he became a partner and sound engineer of Jam Studios recording studio with his brother Ukrit Balangura.

He was persuaded to release a studio album as a solo artist by Surachai Chetchotisak CEO and chairman of RS Promotion. In 1988, he debuted with a song Keb Tawan (เก็บตะวัน, "collect the sun") that contains content that encourages living, with lyrics by Thanapol Intharit. It became his signature song.

Apart from Keb Tawan, his hit songs include Guy Cham (กายช้ำ, "bruised body"), Hai Man Laew Laew Pai (ให้มันแล้วแล้วไป, "let it be"), Pai Tor Pai (ไปต่อไป, "keep going"), Young Cham Wai (ยังจำไว้, "still remember"), Rao Sam Kon (เราสามคน, "three of us"), Din Sai (ดินทราย, "soil and sand"), Jeb Krao Nee (เจ็บคราวนี้, "this time it really hurts"), Rai Sara (ไร้สาระ, "nonsense"), Kan Vela (กาลเวลา, "time"), Roy Rao (รอยร้าว, "a rift"), Nam Nai Ta (น้ำในตา, "water in the eyes"), Ru Na (รู้นะ, "I know"), Mue Dai Chan Rai Rak (เมื่อใดฉันไร้รัก, "when I'm out of love").

He was also an advocate for those who later became famous singers, including Suraphan Jamlongkul of the duo Two and Arisman Pongruangrong.

On 26 August 1994, Balangura performed Keb Tawan with Thanapol Intharit at the Short Charge Shock Rock Concert, and also solo in the next two songs were Ru Na and Jeb Krao Nee.

He left RS Promotion in 1997 and set up his own label called Music On Earth. He released a special album with Thierry Mekwattana from Carabao. However, his label was not very successful.

== Illness and death ==
Around 2002, Balangura was rumored to be terminally ill. He was taken to hospital after neighbours found him unconscious in front of his room. The doctor examined him and found that he was suffering from colon cancer. He returned to work with his former label RS Promotion and performed in his own tribute concert on 30 October 2004. In the show, he sang and played the piano with his wife and 3 daughters.

Balangura died 13 days later, on 11 November 2004, at the age of 49.

== Discography ==
=== Studio albums ===
- Hai Man Laew Laew Pai (1988)
- Pai Tor Pai (1989)
- Itti 3 Vela (1990)
- Itti 4 Pai Daeng (1992)
- Itti 5 Kamlang D (1993)
- Itti 6 Pok Kao (1996)
- Unplugged Shades Of Love (1998)
- Itti & Guitar Mai (1999)
- Vela Ti Lue (2004)

=== Special albums ===
- Heart & Soul feat with Thierry Mekwattana (1997)

=== Compilation albums ===
- Ongsa Fai (1991)
- Ruam Hit Keb Tawan (1994)
- The Best of Itti (1996)
