= Inspirative =

Thai post-rock band

- Origin: Bangkok, Thailand
- Genres: Post-rock, shoegazing
- Years active: 2006–present
- Labels: Finalkid, Earthtone
- Members: Wuttipong Huangpetch; Noppanan Panicharoen; Pongpat Phaukwattana; Amornthep Masawang; Sirichai Chanmanklakul

Inspirative is a post-rock band from Bangkok, Thailand formed in 2006. The band initially started as a solo project of Noppanan Panicharoen. All members joined in 2008 and turned into a full band consisting of Noppanan Panicharoen (guitar), Amornthep Masawang (bass), Pongpat Phaukwattana (guitar), Sirichai Chanmanklakul (drums), Wuttipong Huangpetch (piano, vocal).

Its music is composed of expansive melodic guitar based and ambient field recordings.

== History ==
The band joined a label FinalKid Group in 2007 and released two tracks “The Lost Moment” and “After Sunset” in the FinalKid Compilation 2. In 2008, Inspirative released a three-song EP Floating Down Through The Clouds.

Its album has been reviewed by MARS magazine. On October 16, 2010 DISPLAY magazine had interviewed the band about its origin.

In March 2011, Inspirative had been in the final list of the candidate the term of the instrumental music with the Flames Tree tracks on 23rd Season award, Bangkok, Thailand In May 2011, the band have chance to perform live on music gang program (Truemusic channel) with interview.

== Band members ==
- Noppanan Panicharoen – lead guitar
- Pongpat Phaukwattana – rhythm guitar
- (Currently vacancy) – bass guitar
- Sirichai Chanmanklakul – drums
- Wuttipong Huangpetch - piano, vocal

== Discography ==
- FinalKid Compilation 2 (2007)
- Floating Down Through The Clouds EP (2008)
- The Sleeping Tracks (2009)
- Memories Come Rushing Up To Meet Me Now (2010)
- When We Talk EP (2011)
- Mysteriously Awake (2015)
- Intertia Pt. 1 (2018)
- Invisible Bonds (2024)
