= Hi-Rock =

Thai rock band

- Origin: Bangkok, Thailand
- Genres: Heavy metal; glam metal; speed metal; progressive rock; alternative rock; hard rock; funk rock
- Years active: 1988–1996, 2006–present
- Labels: RS Promotion; Neo Music Network
- Spinoff of: Pisaj; HIROCKSHIMA
- Members: Surush Tubwang; Phoorish Sookarome; Watchara Chandrabutr; Yonlada Phetcharaporn; Anoorak Yingnakorn; Damrongsith Srinak
- Past members: Pornprom Pumsawas; Pacharawat Banthon; Warawut Panitkul; Adinant Nokteat; Kittisak Kongsmy (death 2017)
- Website: hirockband.com

Hi-Rock (Thai: ไฮ-ร็อก) is a Thai rock band famous and popular especially in the 1990s.

== History ==
The band was formed in 1984 by Anoorak "Tui" Yingnakorn (ตุ้ย: อนุรักษ์ ยิ่งนคร) and Seree "Max" Vihokhern (แม็ก: เสรี วิหคเหิน) and brought together musicians to add more. The name "Hi-Rock" comes from playing regularly at The Rock Pub and the owner was the name given to.

Later, when the lead vocalist has resigned, the band has Surush "Pe" Tubwang (เป้: สุรัช ทับวัง) backed up.

Hi-Rock played their first public appearance in mid year 1989 with a back-up band for Pathomporn Pathomporn (ปฐมพร ปฐมพร) at Ramkhamhaeng University among tens of thousands of attendances. At that time, they were asked to change the name to Pisaj temporarily. Later they signed with RS Promotion with the persuasion of the scout Thanapol "Suea" Intharit (เสือ: ธนพล อินทฤทธิ์).

Hi-Rock achieved immediate success with the release of their first studio album Khon Pan Rock in 1990, dressed in a colorful costume, eye makeup, inspired by Cinderella and Loudness.

Hi-Rock has released three studio albums in 1991, 1993 and 1996. Before Tubwang quit in 1997, the band changed name to HIROCKSHIMA and replaced the new lead vocalist. But they were not as successful as in the past.

== Members ==
Current members

- Surush "Pe" Tubwang (เป้: สุรัช ทับวัง): Lead vocalist
- Watchara "Tom" Chandrabutr (ต้อม: วัชร จันทะบุตร): Keyboards and backup singer
- Yonlada "Dream" Phetcharaporn (ดรีม: ยลดา เพ็ชราภรณ์): Drums and backup singer
- Anoorak "Tui" Yingnakorn (ตุ้ย: อนุรักษ์ ยิ่งนคร): Guitar
- Phoorish "Jon" Sookarome (จ้อน: ภูริช สุขารมณ์): Bass
- Damrongsith "Pingpong" Srinak (ปิงปอง: ดำรงสิทธิ์ ศรีนาค): Drums

Former members

- Seree "Max" Vihokhern (แม็ก: เสรี วิหคเหิน): Keyboards
- Pacharawat "Tom" Banthon (ทอม: พชรวัฒน์ บรรทอน): Lead vocalist (only in single Kue Niran in 2013)
- Pornprom "Un" Pumsawas (อั๋น: พรพรหม พุ่มสวัสดิ์): Lead vocalist
- Warawut "Tong" Panitkul (โต้ง: วรวุธ พานิชกุล): Guitar (special)
- Kitisak "Toei" Kongsmy (เต้ย: กิติศักดิ์ คงสมัย): Drums (only first studio album and single Kue Niran; died on July 8, 2017, from liver cancer, aged 52 years)

== Discography ==
Studio albums

- คนพันธุ์ร็อก (Khon Pan Rock; 1990)
- บัญญัติผ่าแปด (Banyat Pa Paed; 1991)
- เจ็บกว่านี้มีอีกไหม (Jeb Khwa Nee Mee Eek Mai; 1993)
- เอชไอวี (H IV; 1996)
