= Nonthaburi province =

Province of Thailand

Nonthaburi นนทบุรี
- Province
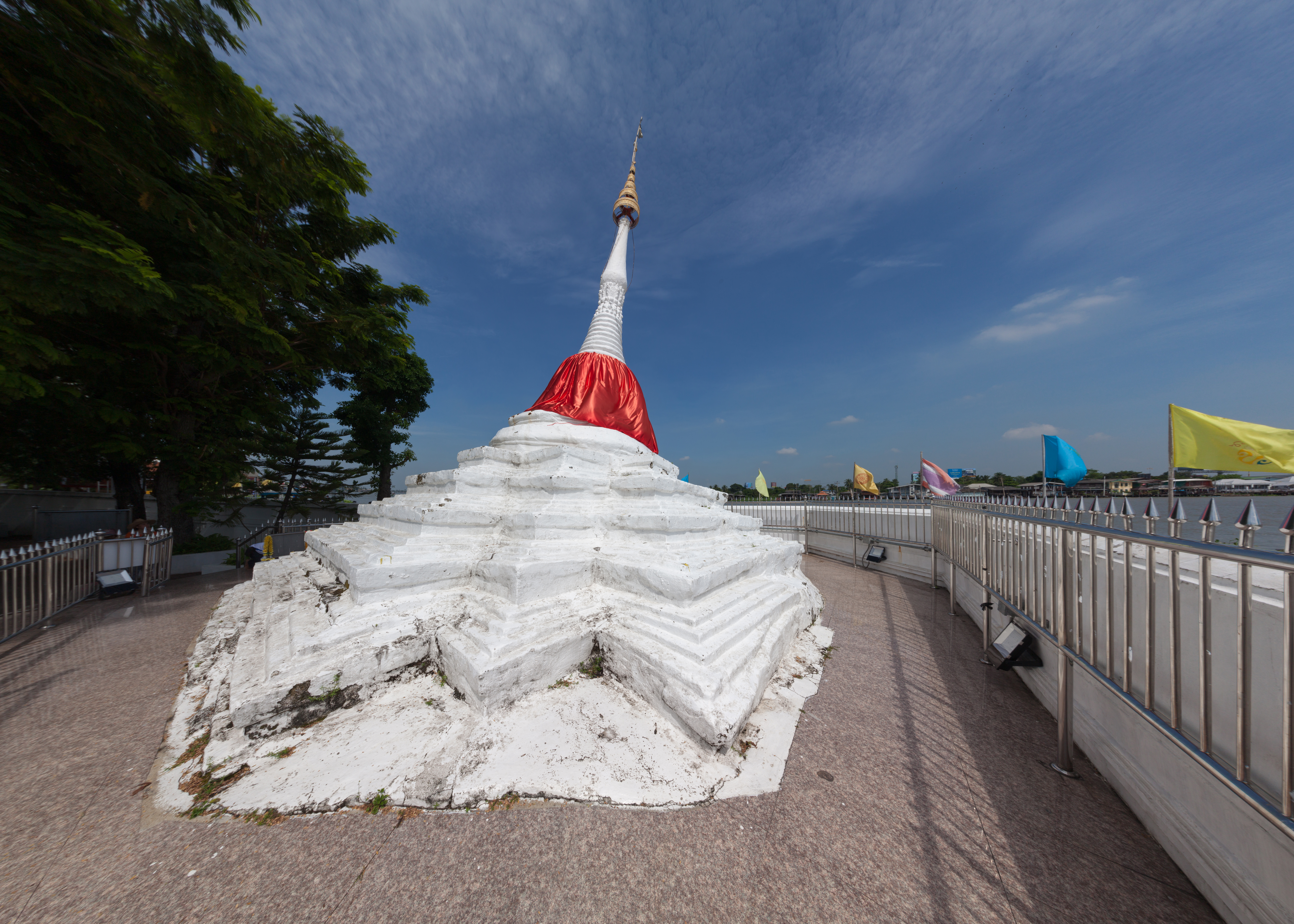
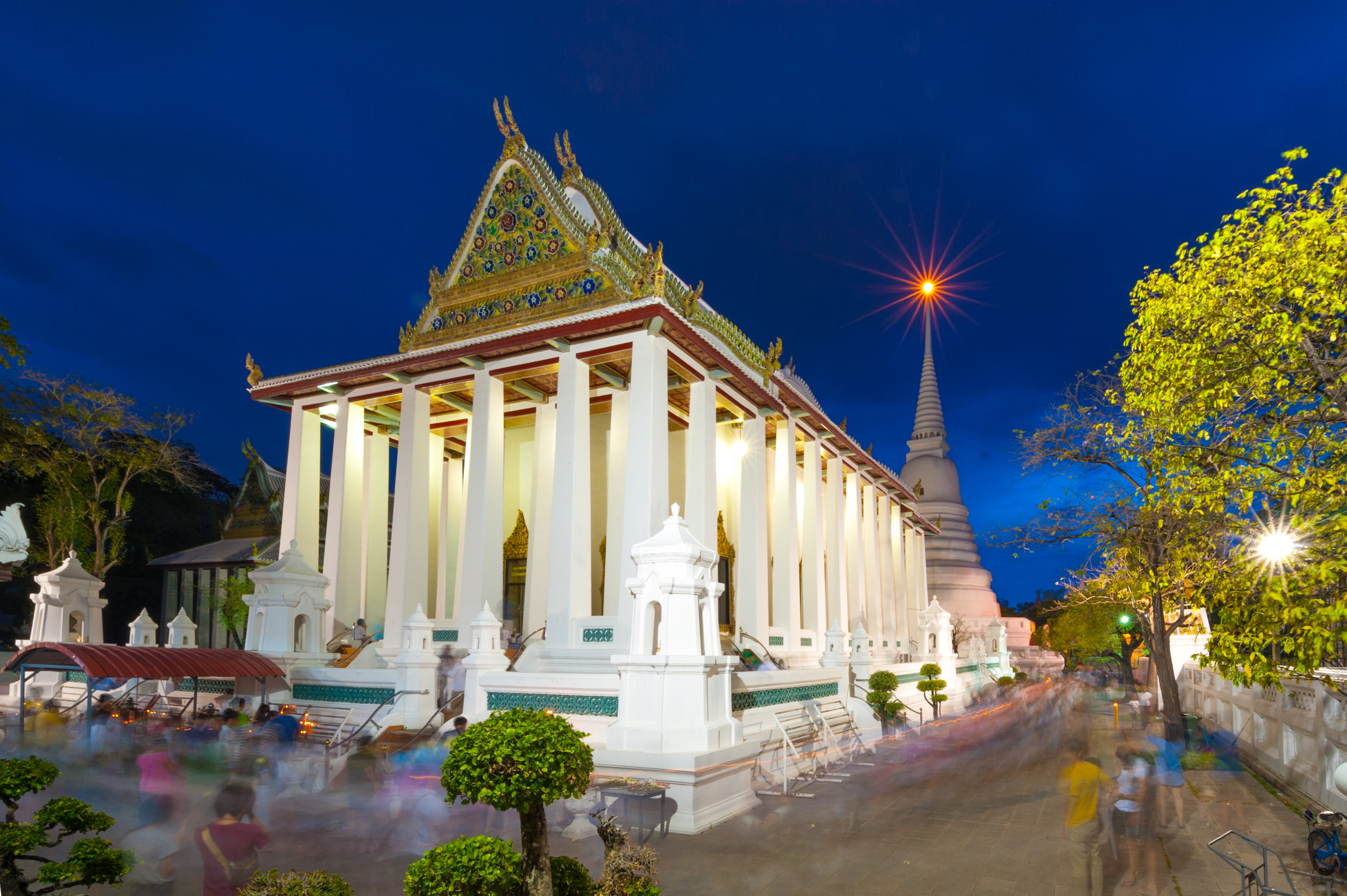
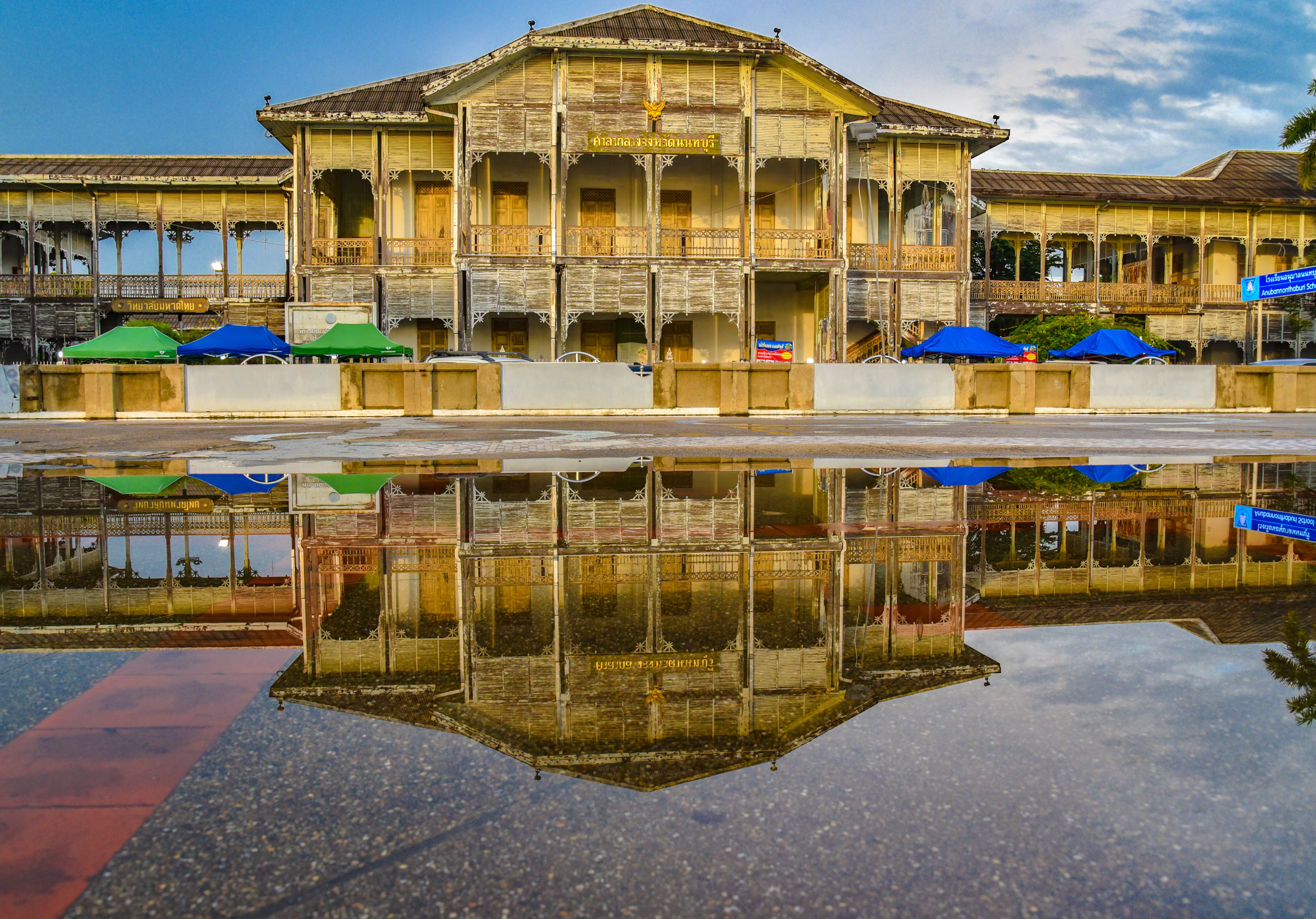
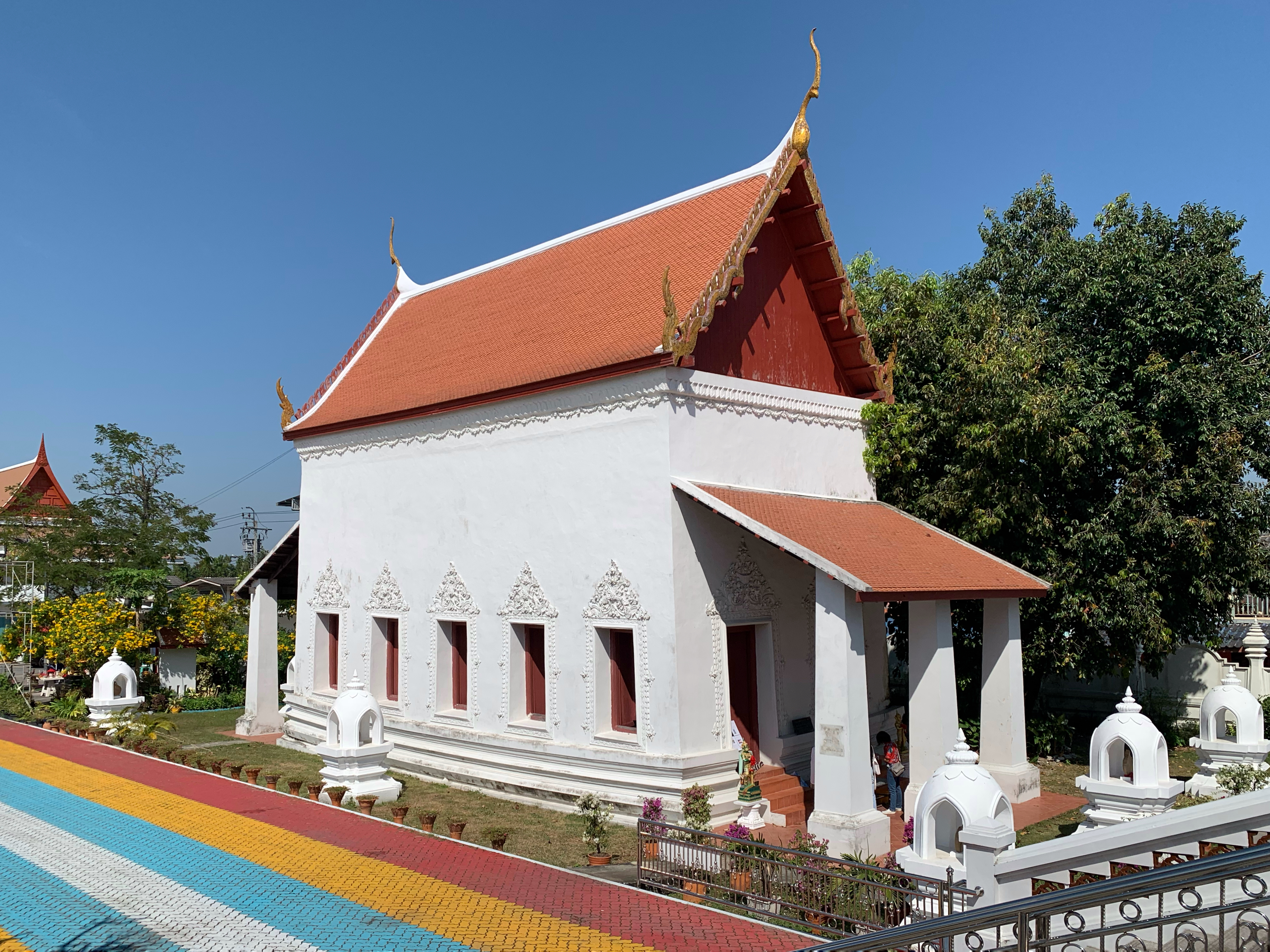
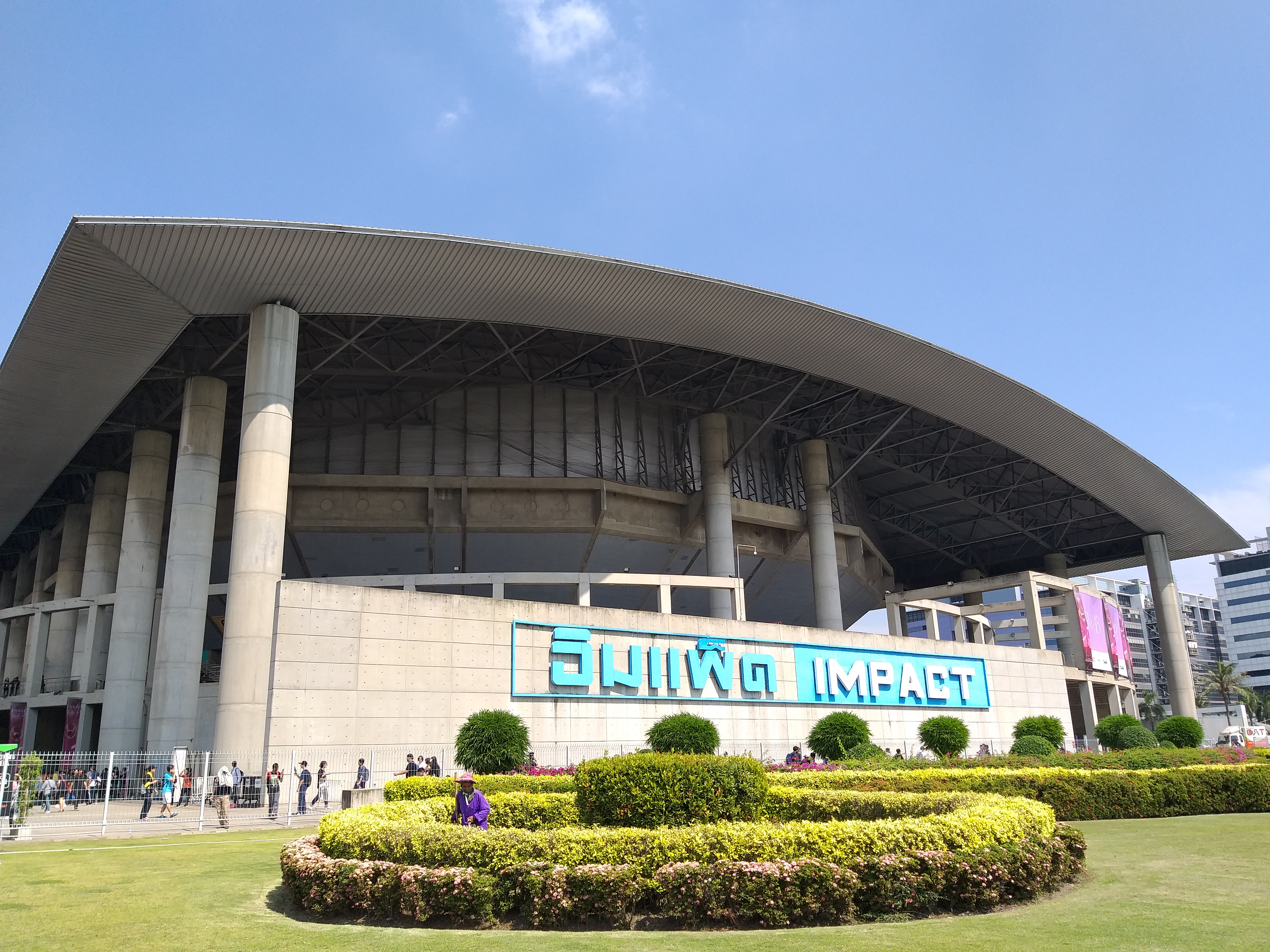
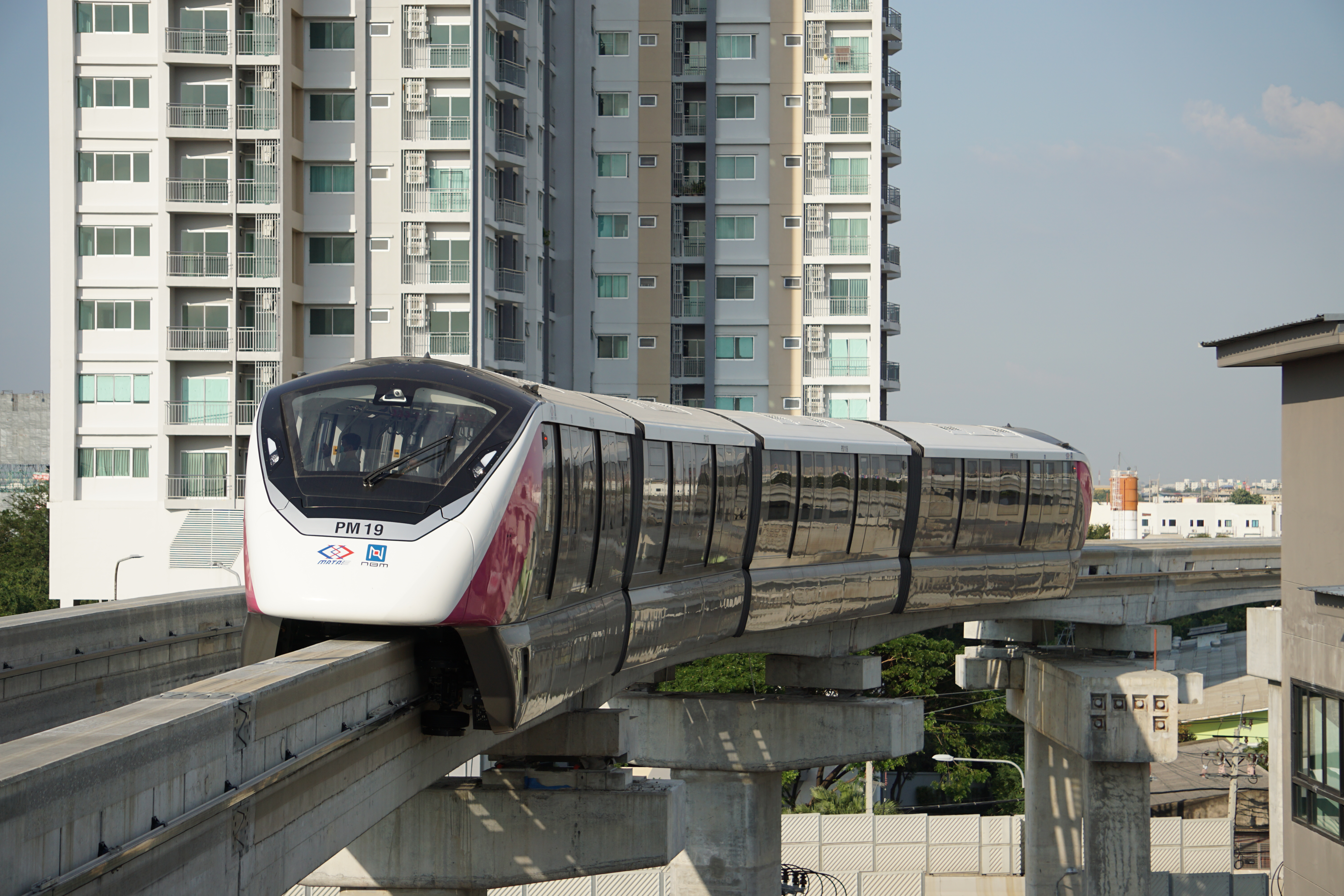
- From top, L–R: Leaning Chedi of Wat Paramaiyikawat, Wat Chaloem Phra Kiat Worawihan, Old Provincial Hall of Nonthaburi, Wat Ku, Impact, Mueang Thong Thani, A train of MRT Pink Line

- Flag Seal
- Nickname: Mueang Non (Thai: เมืองนนท์)
- Mottoes: พระตำหนักสง่างาม ลือนามสวนสมเด็จ เกาะเกร็ดแหล่งดินเผา วัดเก่านามระบือ เลื่องลือทุเรียนนนท์ งามน่ายลศูนย์ราชการ ("Beautiful palace. Famed Somdet Park. Ko Kret, the home of pottery. Renowned old temples. Famous Nonthaburi durian. Attractive old provincial hall.")
- Map of Thailand highlighting Nonthaburi province
- Coordinates: 13°51′45″N 100°30′52″E
- Founded: 1561
- Incorporated into Bangkok: 1943
- Separated from Bangkok: 1946
- Capital: Nonthaburi

Government
  - Type: Province and Provincial Administrative Organization
  - Body: Nonthaburi Province and Nonthaburi Provincial Administrative Organization
  - Governor: Chettha Mosikarat
  - PAO Chief Executive: Naruphon Yenprasert

Area
  - Total: 637 km^{2} (246 sq mi)
  - Rank: 75th

Population (2025)
  - Total: ▲1,322,280
  - Rank: 14th
  - Density: 2,069/km^{2} (5,360/sq mi)
  - Rank: 2nd

Human Achievement Index
  - HAI (2022): 0.6875 "high" Ranked 2nd

GDP
  - Total: baht 317 billion (US$10.5 billion) (2019)
- Time zone: UTC+7 (ICT)
- Postal code: 11xxx
- Calling code: 02
- ISO 3166 code: TH-12
- Vehicle registration: นนทบุรี
- Website: nonthaburi.go.th nont-pro.go.th

Nonthaburi (Note: Thai: นนทบุรี, pronounced [nōn.tʰá(ʔ).bū.rīː]) is one of the central provinces (changwat) of Thailand, established by the Act Establishing Changwat Samut Prakan, Changwat Nonthaburi, Changwat Samut Sakhon and Changwat Nakhon Nayok, Buddhist Era 2489 (1946), which came into force on 9 May 1946 (Thursday).

Neighboring provinces are (from north clockwise) Phra Nakhon Si Ayutthaya, Pathum Thani, Bangkok, and Nakhon Pathom. Nonthaburi is the most densely populated province after Bangkok. The Bang Kwang Central Prison is in the province.

== Geography ==
The province of Nonthaburi is located on the Chao Phraya River basin in central Thailand. It borders Bangkok to the south and to the east, the provinces of Pathum Thani and Phra Nakhon Si Ayutthaya to the north, and Nakhon Pathom to the west. The province is part of the greater Bangkok Metropolitan Region. With an area of 637 km^{2} (246 sq mi), it is the third smallest province in the country by land area.

In most parts, the provice is as urbanized as the capital, and the boundary between the two provinces is nearly unrecognizable. There is no forest area in the province.

== Climate ==
Nonthaburi province has a tropical savanna climate (Köppen climate classification category Aw). Winters are dry and warm. Temperatures rise until May. The monsoon season runs from May through October, with heavy rain and somewhat cooler temperatures during the day, although nights remain warm.

Climate statistics: the maximum temperature is 41.1 °C (106.0 °F) in April and the lowest temperature is 18.2 °C (64.8 °F) in December. The highest average temperature is 38.2 °C (100.8 °F) and the minimum average temperature is 22.2 °C (72.0 °F). Annual total rainfall was 1,290 millimetres (51 in) with total 112 rainy days. Maximum daily rainfall was 76.6 mm (3.02 in) on September 20, 2024.

== History ==
Historical affiliations

Below sea level before 14th century
Kingdom of Ayutthaya 14th century – 1767
Kingdom of Thonburi 1767–1782
Kingdom of Siam 1782–1932
Kingdom of Thailand 1932–present

Nonthaburi was declared a city in the middle of the 16th century. It was previously a village named Talat Khwan. During the reign of King Prasat Thong, a canal was dug to create a shortcut for the flow of the Chao Phraya. The river changed its flow into the new canal, which is still the riverbed today. In 1665 King Narai built a fortress, as the shorter river course was giving enemies an easier route to the capital, Ayutthaya. The town was then moved near the fortress.

From 1943 to 1946 the province was incorporated into Bangkok.

== Symbols ==
The provincial seal shows earthenware, a traditional product of Nonthaburi. The provincial tree and flower is the yellow flame tree (Peltophorum pterocarpum). Nonthaburi is a province where the Chao Phraya River crosses from north to south, and on the ground, the Chao Phraya giant catfish (Pangasius sanitwongsei) is the provincial aquatic life.

The provincial slogan translates to "Grand royal mansion, renowned Suan Somdet, Ko Kret's pottery, famous ancient temples, tasty durians, and the beautiful government office". The royal mansion is a reference to Phra Tamnak Nonthaburi in Mueang Nonthaburi District, the former residence of Prince Maha Vajiralongkorn. Princess Mother Srinagarindra Garden (Suan Somdet) is a water garden with a statue of princess Srinagarindra in the Pak Kret District. The provincial administration building once received an award as the most beautiful such building by the Ministry of Interior.

== Demography ==
=== Population ===
Population history of Nonthaburi province is as follows:

1947	1960	1970	1980	1990	2000	2010	2020
135,537	196,000	254,000	386,741	668,760	816,614	1,334,083	1,276,745

=== Religion ===
Most people in Nonthaburi province are Buddhist, 96.1%, followed by Islam, 3.1%.
Other religions are: Christianity 0.59%, Confucianism, Sikhism and others 0.07%, and Hinduism 0.05%.

Population by religion
Buddhism	96.1%
Islam	3.1%

There are total 198 Theravada Buddhist temples in the province, of which 189 Maha Nikai and 9 Dhammayut temples.

52	Mueang Nonthaburi	50	Bang Kruai	41	Pak Kret
26	Bang Yai	15	Sai Noi	14	Bang Bua Thong

Further there are 38 Cristian churches and 19 Mosques in the province.

== Administrative divisions ==
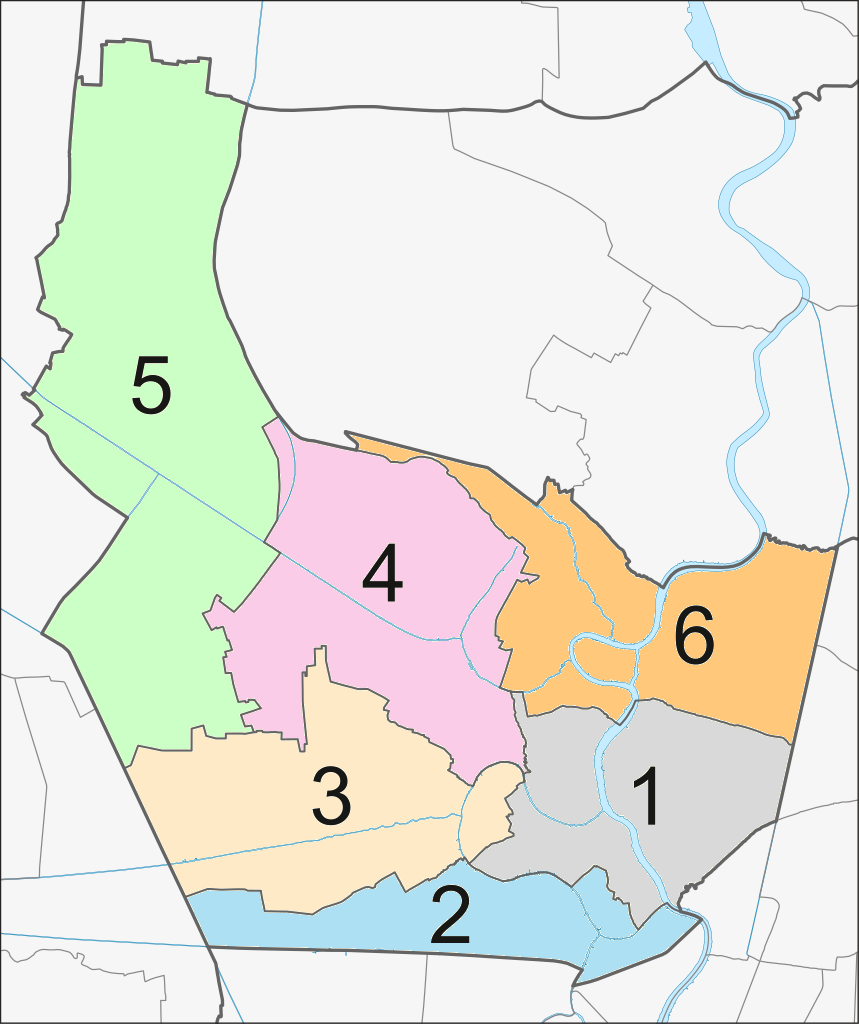
Map of Nonthaburi province with districts

=== Provincial government ===
The province is divided into six districts (amphoes).The districts are further subdivided into 52 subdistricts (tambons) and 395 villages (mubans).

	Districts	People	Subdistricts	Villages
1	Mueang Nonthaburi	356,701	10	32
2	Bang Kruai	156,626	9	60
3	Bang Yai	175,294	6	69
4	Bang Bua Thong	299,858	8	81
5	Sai Noi	79,185	7	68
6	Pak Kret	254,616	12	85

=== Local government ===
As of 20 March 2026 there are: one Nonthaburi Provincial Administrative Organization - PAO (ongkan borihan suan changwat) and thirty-five municipal (thesaban) areas in the province. The capital Nonthaburi, Pak Kret and Bang Bua Thong have city (thesaban nakhon) status. Further twenty-two have town (thesaban mueang) status and ten subdistrict municipalities (thesaban tambon).

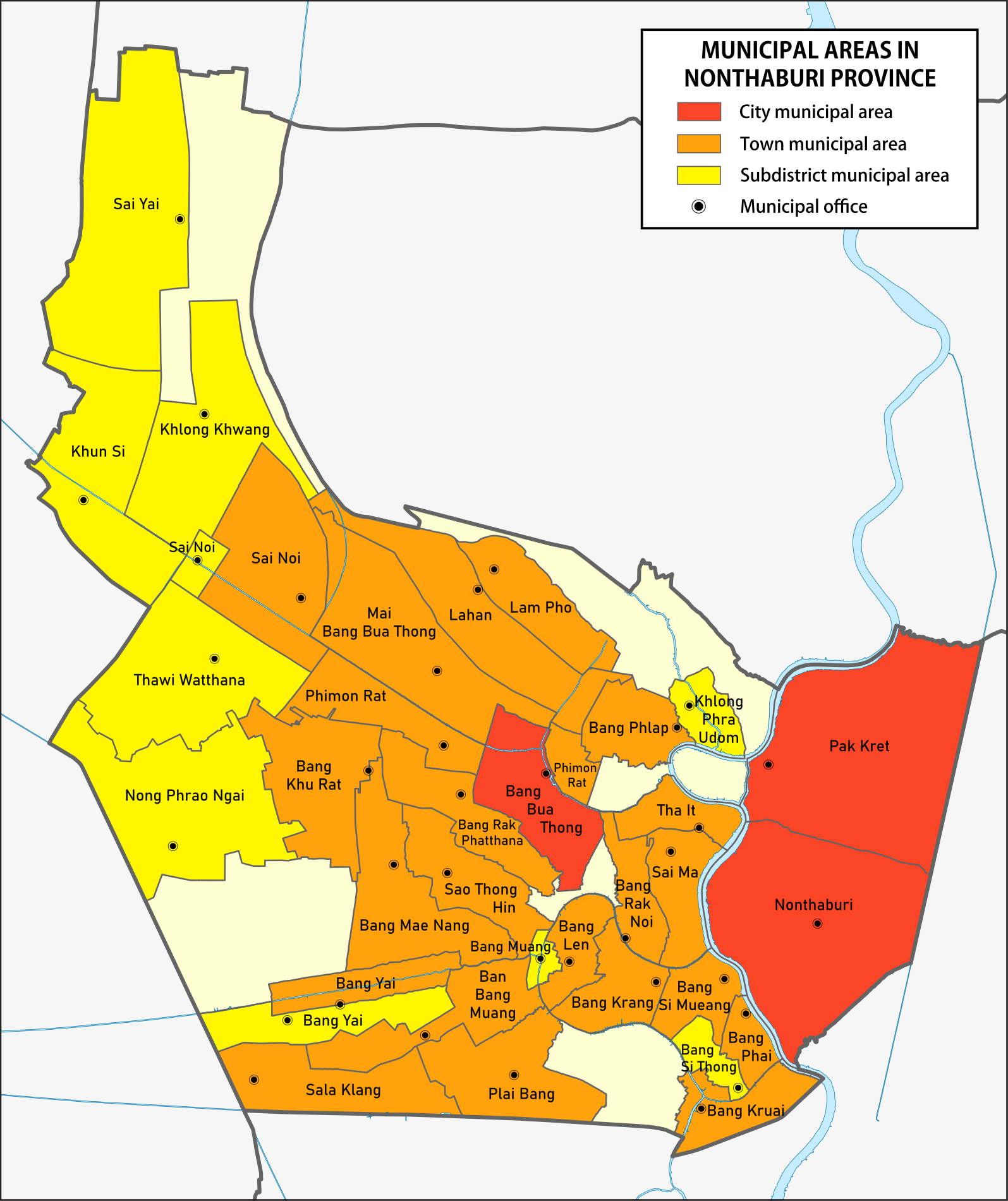

	City municipalities	People	2	Pak Kret	187,449
1	Nonthaburi	239,041	3	Bang Bua Thong	52,518

	Town municipalities	People			
1	Mai Bang Bua Thong	57,748	12	Sala Klang	25,689
2	Bang Mae Nang	53,168	13	Bang Krang	25,311
3	Phimon Rat	52,600	14	Sai Ma	24,674
4	Plai Bang	49,054	15	Bang Rak Noi	21,237
5	Bang Rak Pattana	46,065	16	Ban Bang Muang	18,717
6	Bang Kruai	44,300	17	Tha It	18,663
7	Bang Khu Rat	41,558	18	Bang Len	18,564
8	Sao Thong Hin	40,539	19	Lam Pho	15,473
9	Bang Si Mueang	33,074	20	Bang Mai	14,126
10	Sai Noi	31,993	21	Bang Phai	13,364
11	Lahan	27,892	22	Bang Phlap	12,413

	Subdistrict mun.	People			
1	Bang Yai	14,658	6	Khlong Phra Udom	6,862
2	Bang Si Thong	11,872	7	Sai Yai	6,501
3	Thawi Watthana	9,798	8	Bang Muang	5,876
4	Nong Phrao Ngai	8,266	9	Khun Si	5,264
5	Khlong Khwang	7,610	10	Sai Noi	1,973

The non-municipal areas are administered by 10 Subdistrict Administrative
Organizations - SAO (ongkan borihan suan tambon).

Municipalities	Communities
Nonthaburi	93
Bang Si Muang	41

== Education ==
Educational institutions from primary to high education in Nonthaburi province is as follows:

=== High education ===
- Total four high education entities with 18,116 students.

=== Vocational education ===
- Total thirteen vocational colleges with 13,696 students.

=== Secondary education ===
- Total 40 upper secondary schools with 24,684 students.
- Total 31 lower secondary schools with 33,748 students.

=== Primary education ===
- Total 98 primary schools with 57,581 pupils.

== Health ==
=== Government hospitals ===
There are eleven government hospitals in Nonthaburi province, of which Mueang Nonthaburi district has one regional hospital:
Phra Nang Klao Hospital with 657 beds.
There are seven community hospitals in the other five districts:

Bang Yai Hospital	104 beds	Bang Bua Thong Hospital	102 beds	Pak Kret Hospital	87 beds
Bang Kruai Hospital	60 beds	Sai Noi Hospital	60 beds	Nonthaburi Medical Center	30 beds
Phimon Rat Hospital	30 beds

Furthermore, there are three specialized hospitals in Mueang Nonthaburi district:

Bamrasnaradura Infectious Diseases Institute with 650 beds
Panyanathaphikku Chonprathan Medical Center with 400 beds.
Central Chest Institute of Thailand with 400 beds.

=== Private hospitals ===
There are thirteen private hospitals in Nonthaburi province:

Mueang Nonthaburi	Nonthavej Hospital	208 beds
Mueang Nonthaburi	Lelux Hospital	30 beds
Mueang Nonthaburi	Mind Med	18 beds
Mueang Nonthaburi	Rattanathibeth Medical Center	10 beds
Mueang Nonthaburi	Asia Cosmetic Hospital	6 beds
Pak Kret	World Medical Hospital	150 beds
Pak Kret	Krungthai Hospital	100 beds
Pak Kret	Vibharam Pakkret Hospital	100 beds
Pak Kret	Mitrmaitri Medical Center	11 beds
Bang Yai	Kasemrad Intern. Hospital Rattanathibeth	133 beds
Beng Bua Thong	Kasemrad Hospital Rattanathibeth	119 beds
Bang Bua Thong	Chollada Hospital	59 beds
Bang Kruai	Anan Phatthana 2 Hospital	50 beds

=== Health promoting hospitals ===
There are total 78 health-promoting hospitals in the province, of which: 16 in Mueang Nonthaburi, 15 in Bang Bua Thong, 15 in Pak Kret, 13 in Sai Noi, 11 in Bang Kruai and 8 in Bang Yai districts.

=== Clinics ===
Around 743 clinics are in Nonthaburi province, of which 334 clinics in Mueang Nonthaburi, 184 Pak Kret, 93 Bang Bua Thong, 64 Bang Yai, 59 Bang Kruai and 9 Sai Noi districts.

== Economy ==
=== Economic output ===
In 2023, Nonthaburi province had an economic output of 400.388 billion baht (US$10.54 billion). This amounts to per capita gross provincial product (GPP) of 214,515 baht (US$5,645). In 2025 the total workforce was 1,228,109 of which 1,219,841 persons were employed in economic activity. In agriculture and fishery 16,366 persons (1.3%) were employed and in the non-agricultural sector 1,203,476 persons (98.7%).

Gross Provincial Product (GPP)
	Activities	Million Baht	Percent
1	Trade	66,962	16.7
2	Manufacturing	54,544	13.6
3	Human health	53,258	13.3
4	Finance	45,620	11.4
5	Information	31,626	7.9
6	Defence / publ.admin.	25,832	6.5
7	Real estate	19,559	4.9
8	Pastime	19,302	4.8
9	Construction	14,011	3.5
10	Accommodation / food	12,880	3.2
11	Transportation	12,284	3.1
12	Scientific activity	9,257	2.3
13	Energy	8,097	2.0
14	Education	7,765	1.9
15	Other service activity	6,449	1.6
16	Agriculture	5,515	1.4
17	Administration	5,210	1.3
18	Water supply	2,117	0.6
	Total	400,388	100

Employed persons
	Activities	Workforce	Percent
1	Trade	332,570	27.3
2	Manufacturing	199,544	16.4
3	Accommodation / food	187,377	15.4
4	Transportation	101,575	8.3
5	Construction	74,109	6.1
6	Administration	49,729	4.1
7	Defence / publ.admin.	40,077	3.3
8	Education	37,106	3.0
9	Scientific activity	32,098	2.6
10	Other service activities	30,782	2.5
11	Human health	30,081	2.5
12	Finance	23,321	1.9
13	Real estate	20,729	1.7
14	Information	17,402	1.4
15	Agriculture	16,366	1.3
16	Pastime	11,062	0.9
17	Energy	9,470	0.8
18	Household enterprise	4,724	0.4
19	Water supply	1,718	0.1
	Total	1,219,841	100

=== Trade ===
Wholesale and retail trade; repair of motor vehicles and motorcycles, the biggest sector of the economy generated 66,962 million baht (US$1,762 million) or 16.7% of GPP with 17,734 registered entities and a workforce of 332,570 people (27.3% of all employed persons ).

=== Manufacturing ===
The second sector of the economy generated 54,544 million baht (US$1,435 million) or 13.6% of GPP with 3,5162 registered entities and a workforce of 199,544 people (16.4%).

=== Construction ===
1,340 construction entities and a workforce of 74,109 people (6.1%) contributed 14,011 million baht (US$368 million) or 3.5% of GPP.

=== Agriculture ===
Nonthaburi province is renowned for growing the best durians in the country. Durian has been a well-known fruit in this province for 400 years. The fruit is known as "Durian Non" which means durian from Nonthaburi province. It is also known as the most expensive durian in the world. There are six groups of Nonthaburi durian which are Kop, Luang, Kan Yao, Kampan, Thong Yoi, and miscellaneous. Most durian orchards are near rivers such as the Chao Phraya. This is because the soil next to the river is good for planting which is also good for durian trees. Many durian orchards have disappeared due to flooding and pollution. The price of durian Non depends on its group. Kan Yao is the most expensive, starting from around 10,000 baht up to 20,000 baht (or about US$600) for one durian. The Kan Yao itself is not easy to find in normal markets. The main reason for the high price is because it is rare. The recent flood in 2011 cleared out almost all of the durian trees in Nonthaburi, and only a few trees have been newly planted. Also, residential areas are expanding into agricultural areas.

Agriculture and fishery in Nonthaburi province, the sixteenth sector of the economy, generated 5,515 million baht (US$145 million) or 1.4% of GPP with a workforce of 16,366 (1.3% of all employed persons).

Agricultural land use 270 km^{2} (100 sq mi) is 43.4% of total land of Nonthaburi province 622 km^{2} (240 sq mi). This is divided as follows: paddy land: 152 km^{2} (59 sq mi) 24.4%, farmland: 70 km^{2} (27 sq mi) 11,3%, orchard/perennial crop: 27 km^{2} (10 sq mi) 4.3% and vegetable/ornamental plant: 20 km^{2} (7.7 sq mi) 3.2%.

Production of the arable crop: rice 113,403 tonnes.

Production of the eight main vegetable crops: lettuce 1,346 tonnes, Chinese kale 1,134 tonnes, pakchoi 912 tonnes, water convolvulus 749 tonnes, holy basil 400 tonnes, Chinese chive 381 tonnes, water mimosa 218 tonnes and Thai basil 174 tonnes.

Production of the five main fruit crops: mango 1,465 tonnes, banana 1,117 tonnes; sweet young coconut 569 tonnes, lime 501 tonnes and pomelo 387 tonnes.

=== Animal husbandry ===
Livestock produced included: chickens 113,905, ducks 93,663, goats 4,428 and beef cattle 2,491.

=== Fisheries ===
Total catch from 2,053 freshwater aquaculture farms amounted to 2,746 tonnes.

== Tourism ==
There were 4,340 hotel rooms in 2024; about 4,126,253 people of which 3,881,884 Thai (94%) visited Nonthaburi province and contributed 6,842 million baht (US$193 million) to tourism revenues.

== Human achievement index 2022 ==
Health	Education	Employment	Income
1	29	26	11
Housing	Family	Transport	Participation
68	12	2	68
Province Nonthaburi, with an HAI 2022 value of 0.6875 is "high", occupies place 2 in the ranking.

Since 2003, United Nations Development Programme (UNDP) in Thailand has tracked progress on human development at sub-national level using the Human achievement index (HAI), a composite index covering all the eight key areas of human development. National Economic and Social Development Board (NESDB) has taken over this task since 2017.

Rank	Classification
1 - 13	"high"
14 - 29	"somewhat high"
30 - 45	"average"
46 - 61	"somewhat low"
62 - 77	"low"

Map with provinces and HAI 2022 rankings

== Notable people ==
- Theerathon Bunmathan (born 1990), footballer
- Tussaneeya Karnsomnut (born 1994), actress
- Danupha "Milli" Khanatheeraku (born 2002), rapper and singer
- Apirak Kosayodhin (born 1961), businessman, politician
- Nonzee Nimibutr (born 1962), filmmaker
- Busanan Ongbamrungphan (born 1996), badminton player
- Thanakrit Panichwid (born 1985), singer, actor
- Plaek Phibunsongkhram (1897–1964), soldier, politician
- Vicharnnoi Porntawee (1948–2022), Muay Thai fighter
- Surachart Pisitwuttinan (born 1950s), boxing manager and promoter
- Nuamthong Praiwan (1946–2006), taxi driver, known for his suicide in protest of the 2006 coup
- Srinagarindra (1900–1995), mother of Rama VIII and Rama IX
- Sriarpha Ruennak (born 1956), Thai voice actress
- Sri Sulalai (1770–1837), concubine of Rama II, mother of Rama III
- Surush Tubwang (born 1968), singer and musician
- Chavalit Yongchaiyudh (born 1932), soldier, politician

== See also ==
- Muang Thong Thani, a large real estate development in Nonthaburi
- International School Bangkok, school in Nonthaburi
- Srithanya Hospital, hospital in Nonthaburi
