= Sriarpha Ruennak =

Thai voice actress

- ศรีอาภา เรือนนาค
- Born: Sriarpha Bangnat (ศรีอาภา บางนารถ); 14 December 1956 (age 69); Bang Kruai, Nonthaburi, Thailand
- Occupations: Voice actress, actress
- Years active: 1977–1985, 2020 (actress); 1985–present (voice actress)
- Known for: Thai voices of: Shizuka; Alphonse Elric; Haruhi
- Spouse: Worapot Ruennak (m. 1984)
- Children: 2

Sriarpha Ruennak (Thai: ศรีอาภา เรือนนาค; RTGS: Si-a-pha Rueannak) is a Thai voice actress and actress. She was known for her role as Waew in Nang Sao Thong Sroi (นางสาวทองสร้อย) in 1979 and Dao in Poot Pitsawat (ภูตพิศวาส) in 1980. Sriarpha is located in Bang Kruai, Nonthaburi, and does most of her voice-over work at Channel 9, TIGA, and Rose Media and Entertainment.

Sriarpha's biggest role was as the Thai dubbed version of Shizuka Minamoto in Doraemon. Some of her major roles in anime include Alphonse Elric in Fullmetal Alchemist, Sailor Mercury in Sailor Moon, Haruhi Suzumiya in Haruhi Suzumiya, and Ayumi Yoshida, Kazuha Toyama, Yukiko Kudo, and Jodie Starling in the TIGA dub of Detective Conan from 1999–2012. Some of her fans have nicknamed her "Mae Pueng" or "Mae Pueng Shizuka". (The term 'Mae' in Thai means a 'mother', while 'Pueng' is her real nickname.)

== Biography ==
Sriarpha graduated from Suan Dusit University. She was an actress for about seven years, and also worked as a television reporter for Channel 9. In 1985, she debuted in voice acting by providing the voice of Creamy Mami in Creamy Mami, the Magic Angel. In 2017, she won the Best Actress at the 31st TV Gold Awards. Sriarpha has also voiced several cute heroines, including Shizuka Minamoto in the Doraemon series, Sailor Mercury in Sailor Moon, and Sakura Kinomoto in Cardcaptor Sakura.

== Filmography ==
=== Television series ===
Year	Title	Role	Network
1979	Nang Sao Thong Sroi (นางสาวทองสร้อย)	Waew	Channel 9
1980	Wiman Fai (วิมานไฟ)	Rin Thong	Channel 9
1980	Poot Pitsawat (ภูตพิศวาส)	Dao	Channel 9

=== Voice over roles ===
==== Anime ====
- Creamy Mami, the Magic Angel (Channel 9 dub) - Yuu Morisawa / Creamy Mami
- Doraemon - Shizuka Minamoto
- Dr. Slump (Channel 9 dub) - Gatchan
- Fist of the North Star (Channel 9 dub) - Rin
- Cardcaptor Sakura (Channel 9 dub) - Kinomoto Sakura
- Sailor Moon (Channel 9 dub) - Sailor Mercury
- YuYu Hakusho (Channel 9 dub) - Keiko Yukimura
- Magic Knight Rayearth (Channel 9 dub) - Hikaru Shidou
- Magical DoReMi - Onpu Segawa, Pop Harukaze
- Detective Conan - Ayumi Yoshida, Kazuha Toyama, Yukiko Kudo, Jodie Starling
- You're Under Arrest! (Channel 9 dub) - Miyuki Kobayakawa
- Idaten Jump (Channel 9 dub) - Kakeru Sakamaki
- Ranma ½ (Channel 9 dub) - Shampoo, Kasumi Tendo
- Fruits Basket - Momiji Sohma, Kisa Sohma
- MegaMan NT Warrior (Rockman EXE) - Netto Hikari
- Shattered Angels - Kuu Shiratori
- Please Teacher! - Mizuho Kazami
- Samurai 7 - Kirara
- Genesis of Aquarion - Silvia de Alisia
- MÄR - Ginta Toramizu
- D.Gray-man - Allen Walker
- Evangelion: 2.0 You Can (Not) Advance - Mari Illustrious Makinami
- Nadia: The Secret of Blue Water - Marie
- Mobile Suit Gundam Wing - Relena Peacecraft
- Hikaru no Go - Tōya Akira, Akari Fujisaki
- InuYasha - Kikyo, Sango
- Fullmetal Alchemist - Alphonse Elric
- Air Gear - Ringo
- Sakura Wars - Sumire Kanzaki, Iris Chateaubriand
- Kannazuki no Miko - Chikane Himemiya
- My-HiME - Mikoto Minagi, Yukariko Sanada, Mashiro Kazahana
- Fate/Stay Night - Sakura Mato, Illyasviel von Einzbern, Rider
- Magical Girl Lyrical Nanoha - Nanoha Takamachi
- Perman - Sumire Hoshino (Pāko)
- Mermaid Melody Pichi Pichi Pitch - Hanon Hōshō
- Naruto - Sakura Haruno, Hinata Hyuga
- Sgt. Frog - Natsumi Hinata, Tamama
- Bleach - Orihime Inoue, Karin Kurosaki
- Reborn! - Haru Miura
- Haruhi Suzumiya - Haruhi Suzumiya
- Lucky Star - Konata Izumi
- Great Teacher Onizuka - Tomoko Nomura, Anko Uehara, Nanako Mizuki
- Yu-Gi-Oh GX - Asuka Tenjouin (season 1)
- Kirarin Revolution - Kirari Tsukishima
- Onegai My Melody - Kuromi, Mana Fujisaki
- Kekkaishi - Tokine Yukimura
- Burst Angel - Sei
- Love Hina - Mitsune "Kitsune" Konno, Shinobu Maehara
- Tsubasa: Reservoir Chronicle - Sakura
- Street Fighter II V - Chun Li

==== Film dubbing ====
- Maleficent: Mistress of Evil - Queen Ingrith (Michelle Pfeiffer)

==== TV Program dubbing ====
- Beyond Tomorrow (Channel 9 dub)
- Lab Rats Challenge (Channel 9 dub) - Nicole Dixon
