= RS Music =

- Type: Limited company
- Industry: Music
- Founded: 2004 (Label); 2 May 2023 (Company)
- Headquarters: 27 RS Group Building C, 4th Floor Prasert Manukit Road Sena Nikhom Chatuchak District
- Key people: Surachai Chetchotisak (chairman); Pornpan Techarungchaikul (CEO)
- Products: Music; Concert; Showbiz; Artist
- Parent: RS Group
- Website: www.rsmusicth.com

RS Music (Thai: อาร์เอส มิวสิค) it is a subsidiary of RS Group Public Company Limited, mainly engaged in the central music business. Initially, it was a separate record label during the restructuring of the company's music business in 2004. However, later, several sub-labels gradually reduced their status and merged, so the policy was changed to use the name RS Music as the middle name for the business units. Later, it changed its format back to being a centralized major record label until its role was reduced in 2018.

== History ==
=== Label ===
In 2004, RS Music was launched as one of the 11 sub-labels of RS Public Company Limited, under the management of Khomwit Chetchotisak and Chanakrit Boonsingh, heads of the music production team.

In 2020, RS revived the RS Music business group, which consists of 3 labels: Rose Sound, the first name of RS Company, Kamikaze, and R-Siam.

=== Company ===
Later, in late April 2023, the RS board of directors approved the spin-off of the RS Music business group to establish a subsidiary company to support public crowdfunding through the initial public offering and to be listed on the Stock Exchange of Thailand in 2024, resulting in the official opening of its own social media channels under the name "RS Music Thailand".

Later on May 30, 2023, RS Music launched its first artist after preparing to separate its business, Beam Kawee Tanjararak, a former member of D2B, the label's famous former boy band, who is an artist under the special project RS Homecoming, which brings former artists from the label back to make music under the original label to celebrate RS's 40th anniversary. By releasing a single called "Call Me Daddy" which features his twin sons, Thee and Phee.

Later on July 1, 2023, RS Music joined with Universal Music Group, a business partner, to establish a joint venture worth approximately 1,600 million baht to manage all RS's music copyrights and expand the opportunity to distribute RS's Thai music to foreign markets, with Universal Music Group holding 70% of the shares and RS Music holding 30%. And on July 12, RS appointed Pornpan Techarungchaikul as the CEO of RS Music.

== The Backlash ==
In July 2026, RS Music generated widespread attention by announcing the debut of six new artists under the project RS Music X, collectively known as the Artist Icon lineup. The six artists are Tamin, Joy Joy, Aryn, Noir, Stella, and Luna. The announcement created considerable excitement, as RS had not introduced a new generation of singers for many years. The company planned to gradually release each artist's music, one song at a time. However, it was later revealed that all six were entirely AI-generated artists, with AI-created songs and vocals rather than real human performers. The first release, by Tamin, immediately sparked widespread negative criticism. The song was an AI cover of Kep Tawan ("Keep the Sun"), one of the signature songs of the late Itti Balangura, a celebrated RS artist who rose to fame during the 1980s and 1990s. The new version also featured an added rap section, a creative decision that drew significant backlash from many listeners.
