= Rainbow (Thai band) =

Thai pop band

- Origin: Bangkok, Thailand
- Genres: Thai Pop; Luk thung; Acoustic; Country blues; Rock; Folk; Pop ballad; Country music
- Years active: 1985–1995, 2023–present
- Labels: RS Promotion; ONCEALL MUSIC
- Members: Peerapong Polchana; Teerasak Vadeesirisak; Rewat Sakaeo; Suchart Chanton; Amphorn Chaowiang
- Past members: Tawee Sipradit (death 2005)

Rainbow (Thai: เรนโบว์) were a Thai pop band active from the 1980s to the early 1990s.

== History overview ==
=== Early and stardom ===
Rainbow was planted in 1985 by gathering some members from Inthanin (อินทนิล), the first band under RS. The lead vocalist Peerapong "Tom" Polchana was also one of Inthanin's musicians.

The name Rainbow comes from Rainbow, the British rock band, which Polchana favours guitarist Ritchie Blackmore.

When the first album was released, the band has not yet achieved success. They achieved success with their second album Kwam Nai Jai. It rose to #1 on charts throughout the northeast and nationwide incredibly.

Their popular songs include Kwam Nai Jai (ความในใจ, "inwardness"), Jod Mai Chabab Sud Thai (จดหมายฉบับสุดท้าย, "the last letter"), Young Wang (ยังหวัง, "still hope"), Yak Hai Ru Jai (อยากให้รู้ใจ, "I want you to know my heart"), Tang Chiwit (ทั้งชีวิต, "all my life"), Tao Nan Ko Pho (เท่านั้นก็พอ, "that's enough"), Kho Kae Kid Tueng (ขอแค่คิดถึง, "just miss you"), Jai Diao (ใจเดียว, "single-minded"), Sanya Jai (สัญญาใจ, "promise the heart"), etc.

Many of the band's famous songs are low-tempo songs with Chinese melodies, following the trend of Chinese pop culture that was popular in Thailand at that time i.e. martial arts television series. In addition, Polchana, as a lead singer, also sang the soundtrack for many lakorns (Thai television dramas) on Channel 7 at that time, such as Khu Kam (Note: Featuring the leading actress Kamonchanok Komoltithi.), Kamin Gub Poon (Note: Polchana is also the lyricist.), Kanok Lai Botan, Bua Laeng Nam in 1990, etc.

After releasing eight studio albums and six–seven special albums, including compilation albums as well. The members had reached saturation point. Therefore, ended the band for good.

=== Reunion ===
In October 2023, Rainbow had reunion and releasing new single for the first time in 30 years Yak Krasip Wa Rak Ter (อยากกระซิบว่า...รักเธอ, "I want to whisper that...I love you") under ONCEALL MUSIC, a new label that the band manage themselves.

== Band members ==
=== Current line-up ===
- Peerapong "Tom" Polchana: lead vocals, guitar
- Teerasak "Un" Vadeesirisak: keyboards, backing vocals
- Rewat "Pong" Sakaeo: guitar, backing vocals
- Suchart "Eed" Chanton: guitar, backing vocals
- Amphorn "Phorn" Chaowiang: bass

=== Former member ===
- Tawee "Ot" Sipradit: guitar, drums, keyboards
