= Surush Tubwang =

Thai singer (born 1968)

Anuwat Tubwang อนุวรรตน์ ทับวัง
- Also known as: Pe Hi-Rock
- Born: Surush Tubwang; 20 November 1968 (age 57); Nonthaburi, Thailand
- Genres: Heavy metal; hard rock; sentimental ballad; progressive rock; nu metal
- Occupations: Singer; musician; songwriter; record producer
- Years active: 1980s–present
- Labels: RS Promotion
- Formerly of: Hi-Rock

Anuwat Tubwang (Thai: อนุวรรตน์ ทับวัง, born November 20, 1968), formerly and still colloquially known as Surush Tubwang (สุรัช ทับวัง), nicknamed Pe (เป้), is the former lead singer of the band Hi-Rock.

== Early life ==
Tubwang was born into a Thai Muslim family in the downtown Nonthaburi near Khae Rai intersection. His family was so poor that their house had no roof and walls. Therefore, he only graduated from grade 6.

He was fond of singing since childhood, usually singing in a high tone to compete with the music. He started his career playing music after his older brother and followed him to play music in various pubs around Bangkok and its vicinity at night. His decision to join Hi-Rock as a bassist and lead singer caused him to quarrel violently with his elder brother.

== Career ==
Hi-Rock was an instant success with their first studio album Khon Phan Rock (คนพันธุ์ร็อก) in 1990, which made Tubwang widely known. The band released two follow-up studio albums in 1991 and 1993.

In 1994, he released a special album Rock Amphan (ร็อกอำพัน) with Pisut Subwijit that brought songs of The Impossibles to be re-arranged in the style of heavy metal and sentimental ballad. With over two million copies sold, the album was followed by Rock Amphan Lukcore Fai (ร็อกอำพัน ลูกคอไฟ) in 1998.

Most of his popular songs were downtempo music in the sentimental ballad style include Khwa Ja Ru Suek (กว่าจะรู้สึก, "by the time I feel"), Krajok Round (กระจกร้าว, "the cracked glass"), Nan Saen Nan (นานแสนนาน, "a long time"), Kue Phuan (คือเพื่อน, "is a friend"), Nangfah Rue Pisaj (นางฟ้าหรือปีศาจ, "fairy or devil"), Ya Klub Ma (อย่ากลับมา, "don't come back"), Keun Ham Jai (เกินห้ามใจ, "uncontrolled love"), Khluen Hua Jai (คลื่นหัวใจ, "heart wave"), Sing Nun (สิ่งนั้น, "that thing"), Pit Rak (พิษรัก, "love poison"), Tammi Mai Tamhai Tai (ทำไมไม่ทำให้ตาย, "why don't you just kill me?").

During the peak of his career, Tubwang was known as the high-pitched male singer in Thailand.

== Later career ==
After the unsuccessful fourth studio album HIV in 1996, the following year the members of Hi-Rock split up. Someone have created a new band called HIROCKSHIMA. Tubwang has branched out as a solo artist, and still is present.

== Personal life ==
Tubwang has been married twice to both actress wives. He currently lives with his third wife, she was 21 years younger than him. He has 3 children (2 sons, 1 daughter) from 3 wives.

In 2021, he turned his house in Bang Bua Thong area into a steakhouse and café to replace lost jobs during the COVID-19 pandemic.

== Discography ==
=== Hi-Rock ===
- Khon Phan Rock (คนพันธุ์ร็อก, "rock human") 1990
- Banyat Pa Paed (บัญญัติผ่าแปด, "the eight commandments") 1991
- Jeb Khwa Ni Mi Ik Mai (เจ็บกว่านี้มีอีกไหม, "is there more hurt than this") 1993
- HIV (เอชไอวี, "HIV") 1996

=== Solo ===
- Chob Diao (โฉบเดี่ยว, "to go it alone") 1998
- Program (โปรแกรม, "program") 2002

=== Special albums ===
- Rock Amphan (ร็อกอำพัน, "amber rock") feat with Pisut Subwijit 1994
- Rock Amphan Lukcore Fai (ร็อกอำพัน ลูกคอไฟ, "amber rock: fiery coloratura") feat with Pisut Subwijit 1998

=== Compilation albums ===
- Rock Phuan Kan (ร็อกเพื่อนกัน, "fellow rock") 1993
- Hi-Rock Ruam Hit (ไฮ-ร็อก รวมฮิต, "compilation Hi-Rock") 1995
