= Surachai Chetchotisak =

Thai businessman

- Born: November 5, 1962 (age 62)
- Occupation: businesspeople
- Spouse: Sujira Chetchotisak
- Children: 2

Surachai Chetchotisak (Thai: สุรชัย เชษฐโชติศักดิ์; born 5 November 1962) is a Thai businessman was the co-founder and Chief Executive Officer of RS Group Public Company.

== Biography ==
Surachai Chetchotisak born on November 5, 1962, is a Thai businessman of Chinese descent. He is the middle child among 7 siblings. His father was a home painter, and his mother was a housewife and is the younger brother of Kriangkrai Chetchotisak, the founder and former Chief Executive Officer of RS.

In 1976, Kriangkrai and Surachai, at the age only of 14, started a business under the name Rose Sound with an investment of 50,000 baht after the Copyright Act of 1978 came out, affecting Rose Sound's business. Kriangkrai and Surachai therefore decided to seriously change the business into a record label business and changed the company name from Rose Sound to RS Sound in 1981. The company's first office was located on Uruphong Road and has Inthanin was the first artist of the record label.
