= Pop rock =

Music genre

- Stylistic origins: Pop; rock and roll; doo-wop
- Cultural origins: Late 1950s
- Derivative forms: Indie pop; Britpop; soft rock

Subgenres
- Power pop; jangle pop

Fusion genres
- Pop metal

Other topics
- Brill Building; bubblegum; new wave; glam metal; pop-punk; rockism and poptimism; rock and roll

Pop rock (also typeset as pop/rock) is rock music with greater emphasis on professional songwriting and recording craft, and less emphasis on attitude than standard rock music. Originating in the late 1950s as an alternative to normal rock and roll, early pop rock was influenced by the beat, arrangements, and original style of rock and roll (and sometimes doo-wop). It is categorized both as a distinct music genre and as continuous categories of pop and rock. The detractors of pop rock often deride it as a slick, commercial product and less authentic than rock music.

== Characteristics and etymology ==
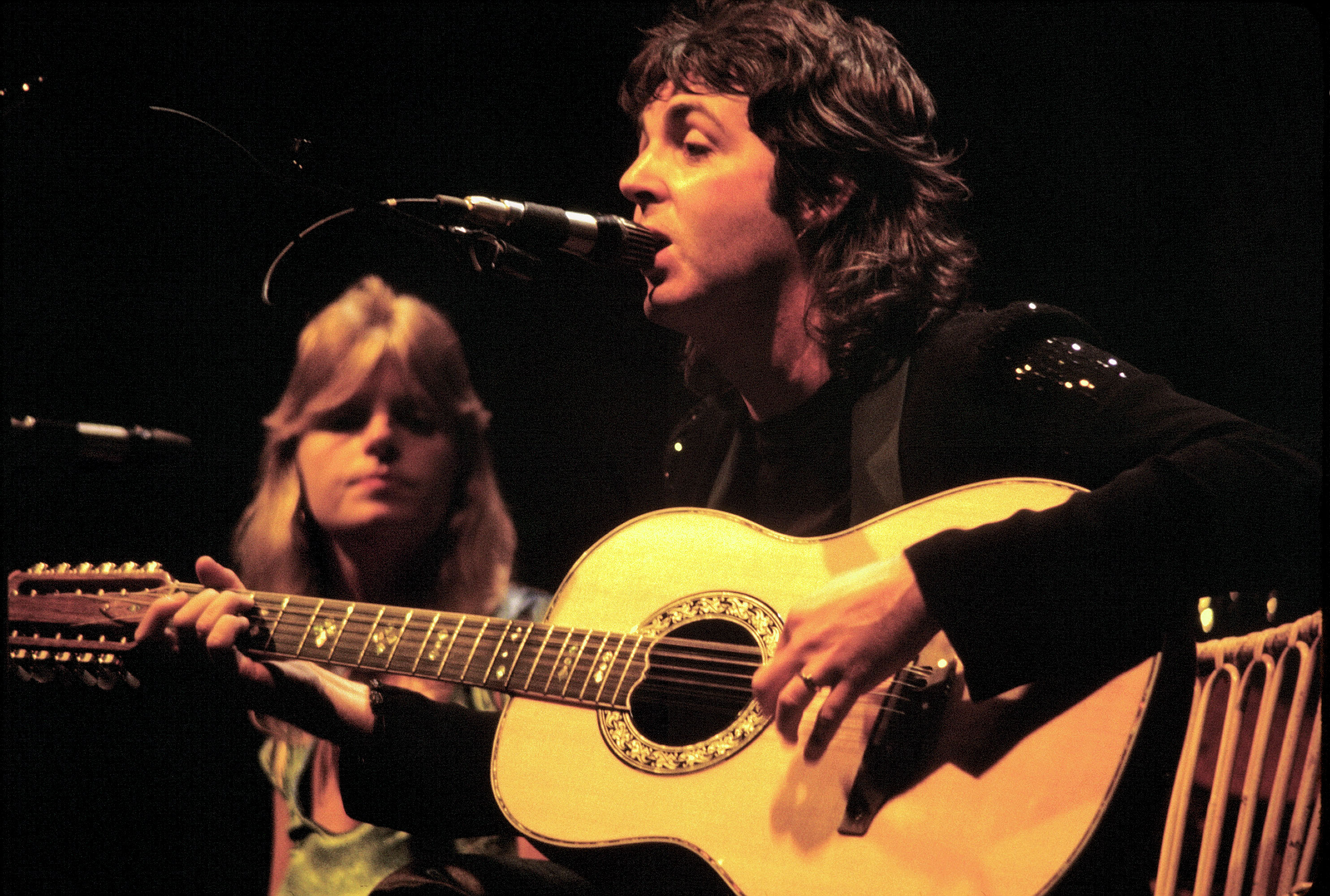
Paul McCartney and Wings performing in 1976 (Paul and Linda McCartney pictured)

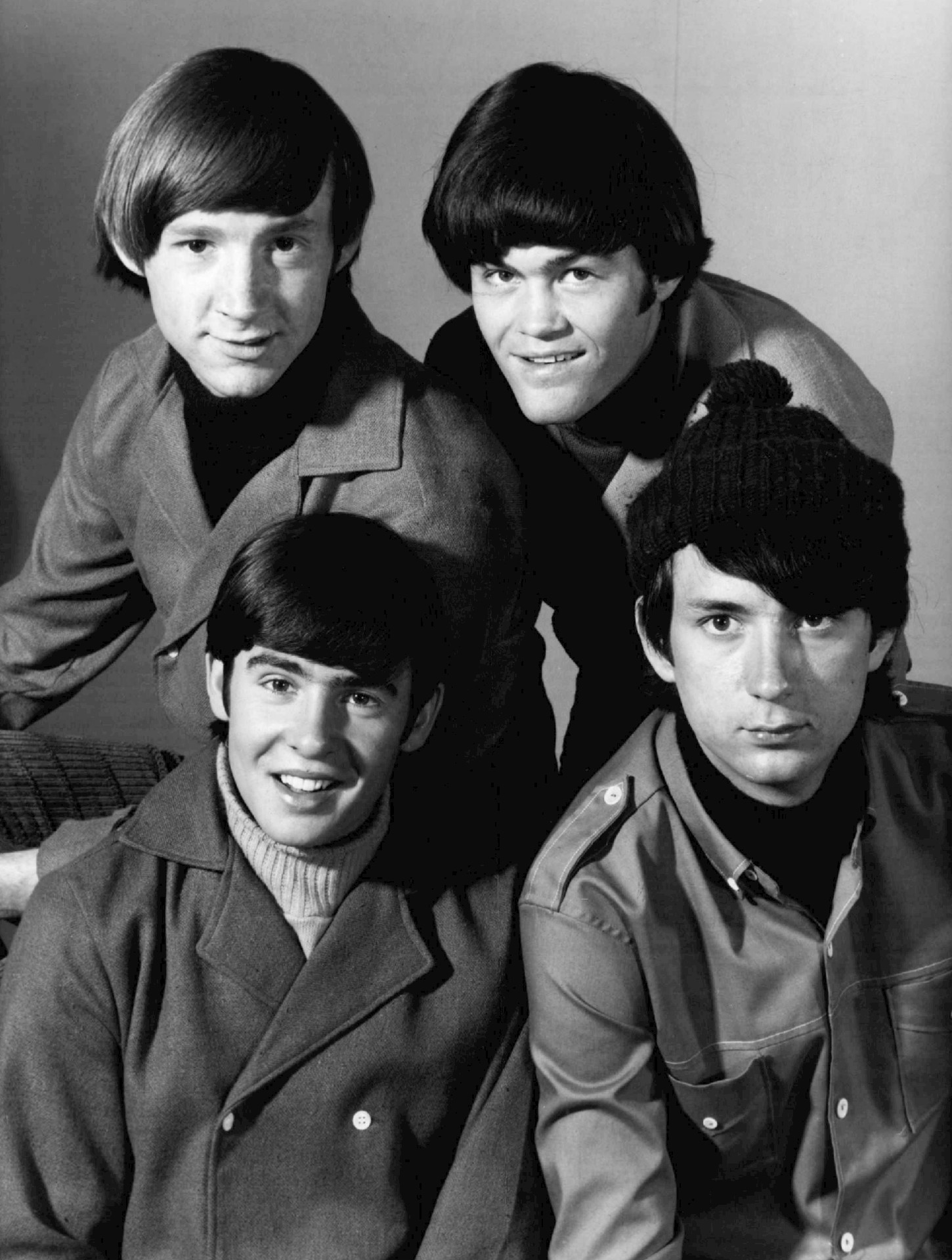
The Monkees in 1966

Much pop and rock music has been very similar in sound, instrumentation and even lyrical content. The terms "pop rock" and "power pop" have been used to describe more commercially successful music that uses elements from, or the form of, rock music. Writer Johan Fornas views pop rock as "one single, continuous genre field", rather than distinct categories. To the authors Larry Starr and Christopher Waterman, it is defined as an "upbeat variety of rock music" represented by artists and bands such as Andy Kim, the Bells, Paul McCartney, Lighthouse, and Peter Frampton.

The term "pop" has been used since the early 1940s to refer to popular music in general, but in the mid-1950s, it began to be used for a distinct genre, aimed at a youth market, often characterized as a softer alternative to rock and roll. In the aftermath of the British Invasion, from about 1967, it was increasingly used in opposition to the term rock, to describe a form that was more linked to traditional songwriting, ephemeral and accessible.

As of the 2010s, "guitar pop rock" and "indie rock" are roughly synonymous terms. "Jangle" is a noun-adjective that music critics often use in reference to guitar pop with a bright mood.

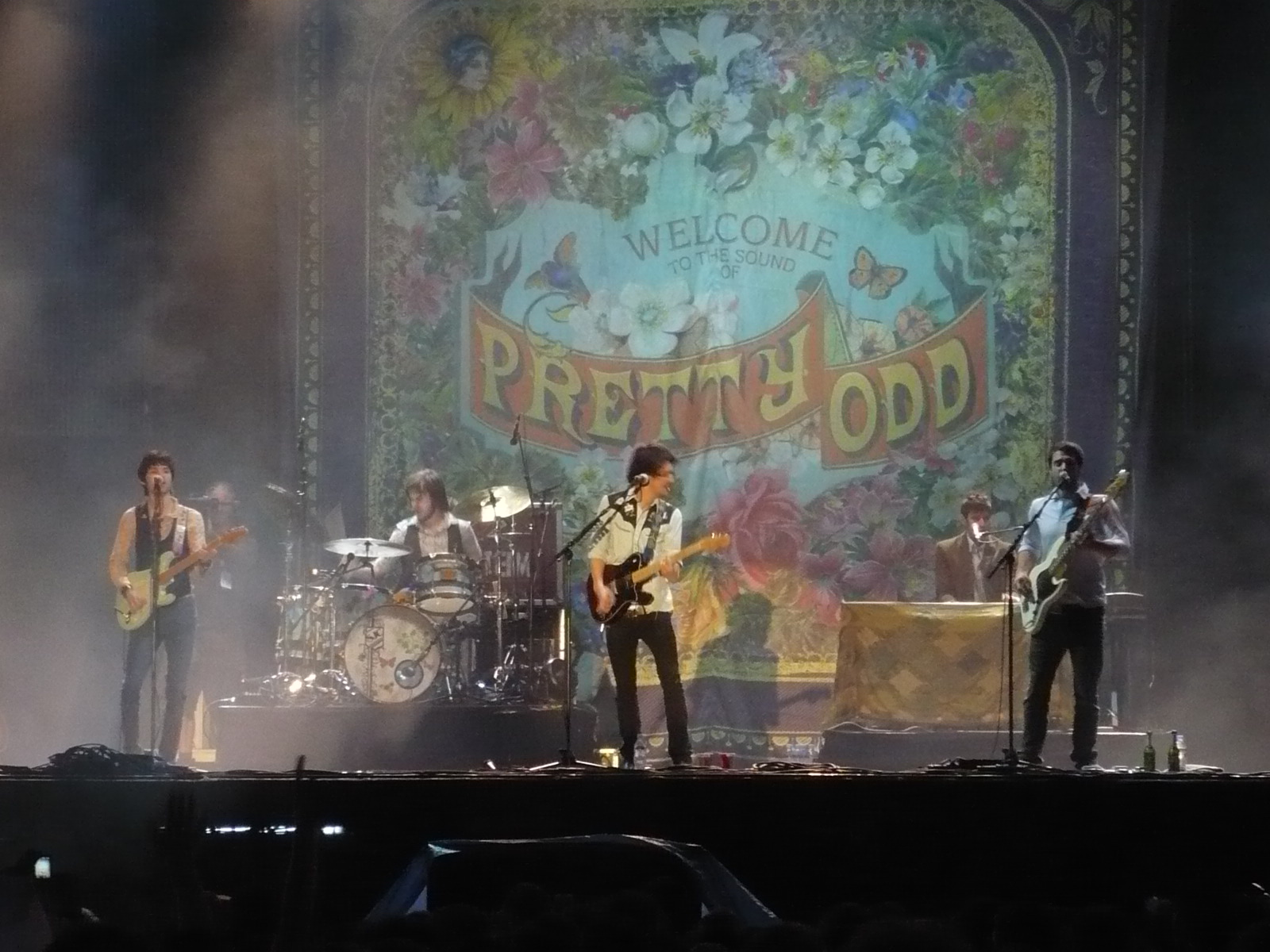
Panic! at the Disco performing in 2008

== Debates ==
Critic Philip Auslander argues that the distinction between pop and rock is more pronounced in the US than in the UK. He claims that in the US, pop has roots in white crooners such as Perry Como, whereas rock is rooted in African-American music influenced by forms such as rock and roll. Auslander points out that the concept of pop rock, which blends pop and rock, is at odds with the typical conception of pop and rock as opposites. Auslander and several other scholars, such as Simon Frith and Grossberg, argue that pop music is often depicted as an inauthentic, cynical, "slickly commercial", and formulaic form of entertainment. In contrast, rock music is often heralded as an authentic, sincere, and anti-commercial form of music, which emphasizes songwriting by the singers and bands and instrumental virtuosity.

Frith's analysis of the history of popular music from the 1950s to the 1980s has been criticized by B. J. Moore-Gilbert, who argues that Frith and other scholars have overemphasized the role of rock in the history of popular music by naming every new genre using the "rock" suffix. Thus, when a folk-oriented style of music developed in the 1960s, Frith termed it "folk rock", and the pop-infused styles of the 1970s were called "pop rock". Moore-Gilbert claims that this approach unfairly puts rock at the apex and makes every other influence become an add-on to the central core of rock.

In Christgau's Record Guide: Rock Albums of the Seventies (1981), Robert Christgau discussed the term "pop-rock" in the context of popular music's fragmentation along stylistic lines in the 1970s; he regarded "pop-rock" as a "monolith" that "straddled" all burgeoning movements and subgenres in the popular and semipopular music marketplace at the time, including singer-songwriter music, art rock, heavy metal, boogie, country rock, jazz fusion, funk, disco, urban contemporary, and new wave, but not punk rock.

== See also ==
- List of pop rock bands
- Beat music
- Indie pop
- Post-punk
- Twee pop
