= RS Group =

Thai entertainment & media company

RS Public Company Limited

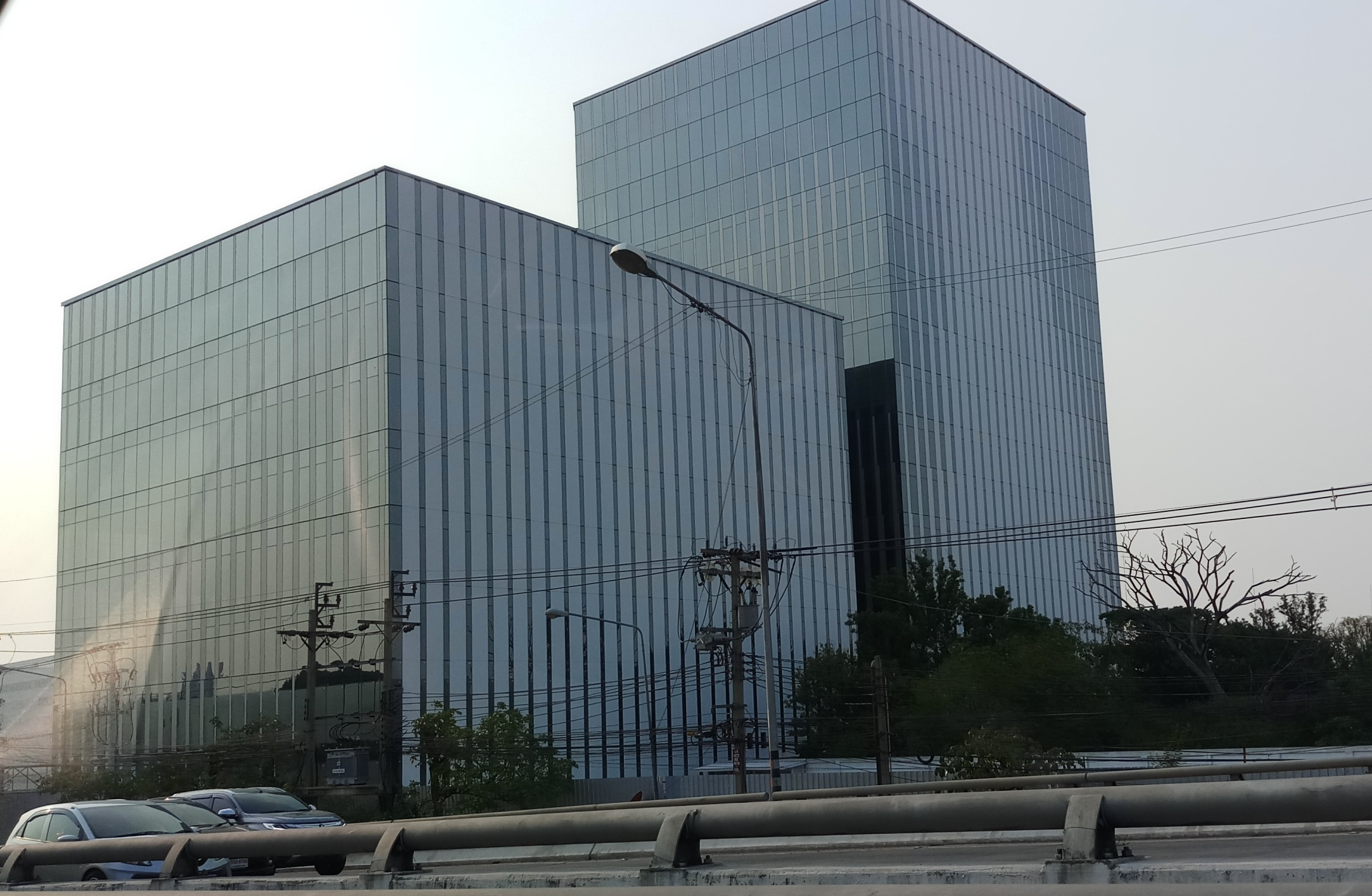
- RS Group Building
- Type: Public
- Traded as: SET: RS
- ISIN: TH0705C10Z09
- Industry: Entertainment and media
- Founded: 1976; 50 years ago (listed in 2003)
- Headquarters: 27 RS Group Building, Prasoet Manukit Road, Senanikom, Chatuchak, Bangkok, Thailand
- Area served: Thailand
- Key people: Founder: Kriengkai Chetchotisak; CEO: Surachai Chetchotisak
- Products: Media, Music and Showbiz
- Revenue: 3,484 million baht (from 2013 financial statement)
- Net income: 395 million bht
- Number of employees: 1,182
- Website: www.rs.co.th

RS Group (Thai: บริษัท อาร์เอส จำกัด (มหาชน)) is a Thai entertainment and media company formed in 1982 by Surachai Chetchotisak and Kriangkai Chetchotisak. It is one of the companies under Stock Exchange of Thailand. It is divided into two main business groups: the Commerce business, which contains RS Mall and Lifestar Company Limited, and the Media and Entertainment business, which contains Channel 8, COOLism, and RS Music.

== History ==
RS Group Logo 1990–1993

In 1976, Surachai Chetchotisak and Kriangkai Chetchotisak founded Rose Sound and RS, when they open a jukebox shop and record label on Uruphong Road with the total of 50,000 baht. Then in 1981, the shop developed into teen pop music under the name R.S. Sound Corporation Ltd., with the first ever contract with Inthanin, before signing other popular Thai bands such as Keereeboon and Rainbow.

In 1992, the company relocated to the Chetchotisak Building on Lat Phrao Road in Chatuchak and rebranded as R.S. Promotion 1992 Corporation Ltd. In 1995, the company developed into a film company under the name R.S. Film with the movie, Romantic Blue. In 1999, the company reorganized and entered the radio broadcasting sector under Sky-High Network Co., Ltd., which broadcast in 98 Cool FM and 88.5 Z POP We Like.

RS Group Logo 2009–2020

In 2003, RS Group signed a contract with Stock Exchange of Thailand, and rebranded from R.S. Promotion Public Company Limited to RS Public Company Limited in 2006 to mark its 25th anniversary. In 2007, the company established as RS International Broadcasting and Sport Management Corporation Ltd. and RS iDream Corporation Ltd. for sports and live entertainment, including UEFA Euro 2008, the 2010 FIFA World Cup, and the 2014 FIFA World Cup. RS expanded into satellite television in 2009, followed by Channel 8 in 2011.

In 2014, RS group reworked its radio operations under COOL Fahrenheit 93 and began entering the health and beauty retail. The company launched its commerce subsidiary, LifeStar Corporation Ltd. By 2017, LifeStar had expanded into skincare, haircare, and dietary supplements. In 2018, the company completed the multi-platform commerce enterprise.

In 2023, RS Group partnered with GMM Grammy. On 27 April of the same year, RS's directors approved the spin-off of its RS Music division into a subsidiary for an initial public, which listed on the Stock Exchange of Thailand in 2024. In 2025, RS's market experienced a decline driven by forced selling of shares in margin accounts, which is linked to major shareholders or company executives.

== Businesses ==
=== RS Music ===
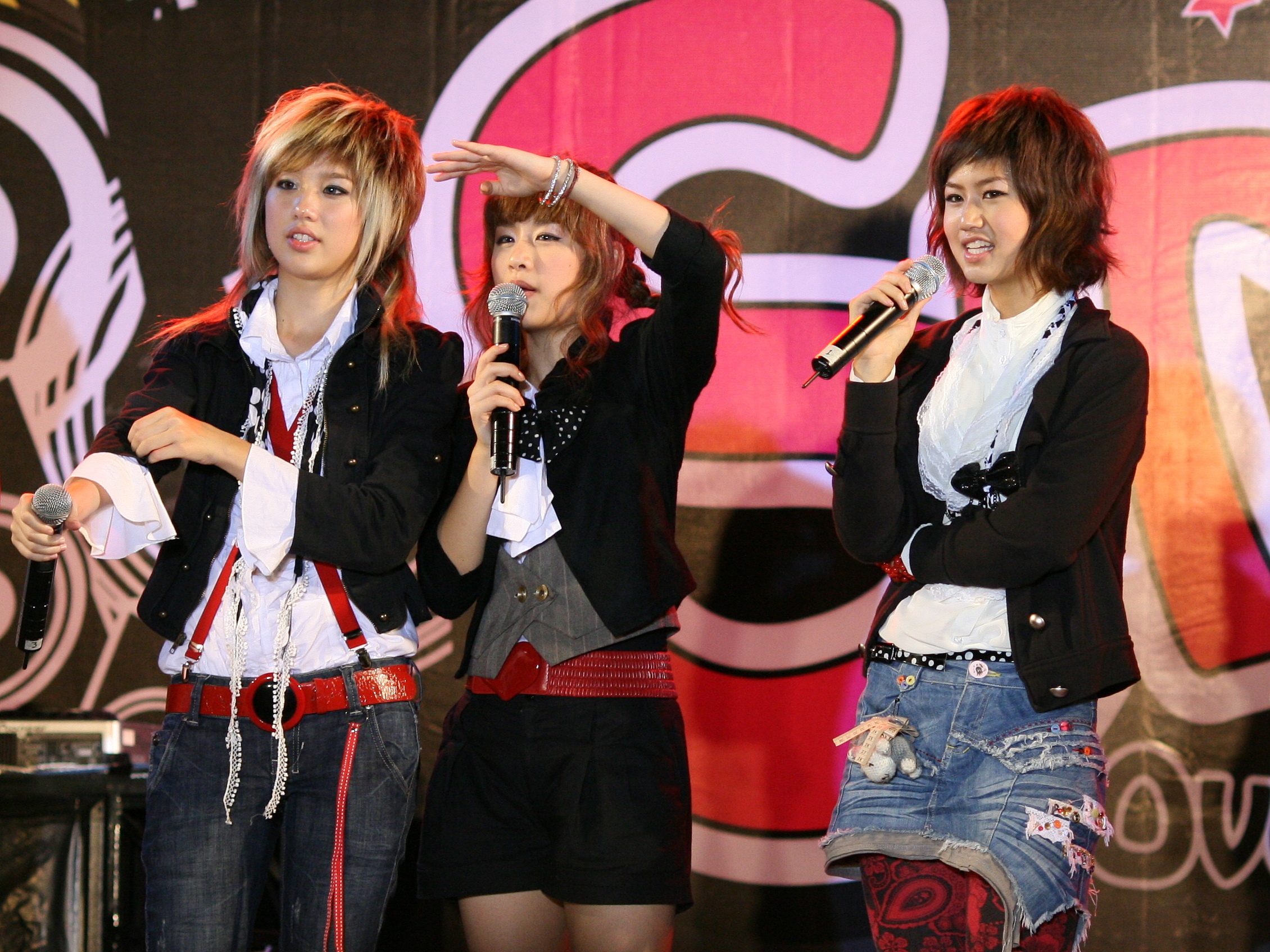
Faye Fang Kaew, first teen band of the company

There are eight recording labels under RS Music, covering Thai pop (string) and Thai country music (luk thung) as well as rock, hip hop, rhythm and blues and easy listening. The labels are Yes! Music, Garden, Kamikaze, R-siam, Mingset Mob, The Demo and CHO.

=== RS Vision ===
RS Group also have the business in Television from Channel 8, Originally a satellite channel but currently Terrestrial Free-to-air Channel that’s content is General Entertainment.

== See also ==
- List of record labels
- Media of Thailand
