= List of Thai pop artists =

This is a list of Thai pop artists and groups.

== Thai pop bands ==
- Boyscout (1993-)
- D2B (2001-)
- FFK (2007-)
- Hi-Jack (1992-)
- K-OTIC (2007-)
- BNK48 (2017-)
- Sizzy (2019-2024)
- CGM48 (2019-)
- Pretzelle (2020-2025)
- PiXXiE (2020-)
- 4EVE (2020-)
- PROXIE (2022-)
- LYKN (2023-)
- BUS (2023-)
- DICE (2024-)
- JASP.ER (2024-)
- Felizz (2025-)
- DEXX (2025-)

== Thai pop duos ==
- China Dolls (1999-)
- Four-Mod (2005-)
- Lift&Oil (1994-)
- Neko Jump (2006-)
- Two (1991-)
- Golf & Mike (2005-) (G-Junior 1 formed by GMM and Training Project collaboration between GMM and Johnny's)
- Raptor (1994-)
- JMNK - JustmineNika (2022-)
- Byrd & Heart (1985-)
- EMIBONNIE (2026-)

== Thai pop soloists ==
- Aof Pongsak (2004-)
- Bird Thongchai (1986-)
- Boyd Kosiyabong (1994-)
- Bright Vachirawit (2020-)
- Chinawut Indracusin (2006-) (G-Junior 1 formed by GMM and Training Project collaboration between GMM and Johnny's)
- Christina Aguilar (1990-)
- Fourth Nattawat (2023-)
- Gam Wichayanee (2008-)
- Gawin Caskey (2019-)
- Gemini Norawit (2023-)
- Gena Desouza (2016-)
- Gun Napat (2010-)
- Ice Sarunyu (2006-)
- Jame Ruangsak (1995-)
- Jannine Weigel (2010-)
- J Jetrin (1991-)
- Joey Boy (1995-)
- Katreeya English (1990-)
- Keng Tachaya (2011-)
- Krist Perawat (2017-)
- Lanna Commins (2004-)
- Lydia Sarunrat (2005-)
- Mai Charoenpura (1989-)
- MEYOU (2017-)
- Mos Patiparn (1993-)
- Nanon Korapat
- Nicole Theriault (1998-)
- NuNew Chawarin (2023-)
- Palmy (2001-)
- Peck Palitchoke (2005-)
- Perth Tanapon (2021-)
- Phuwin Tangsakyuen (2022-)
- Stamp (2002-)
- Bie The Star (2006-)
- Tata Young (1991-)
- Third Lapat (2013-)
- Tik Shiro (1987-)
- Timethai Plangsilp (2011-)
- Tor Saksit (2007-)
- Touch Na Takuathung (1990-)
- The Toys (Thai musician) (2015-)
- Yayaying (1999-)
- Win Metawin (2020-)

== Thai pop-rock bands ==
- Armchair (2001-)
- Asanee–Wasan (1986-)
- Big Ass (1997-)
- Bodyslam (2002-)
- Carabao (1981-)
- Clash (2001-)
- Endorphine (2007-)
- Fame (1989-1991,2019-)
- Getsunova (2008-)
- Hi-Rock (1990-)
- La-Ong-Fong (1996-)
- Modern Dog (1994-)
- Paradox (1996-)
- Pause (1996-)
- Potato (2001-)
- Pru (2001-)
- Silly Fools (1996-)
- Slot Machine (2004-)
- So Cool (2004-)
- Three Man Down (2013-)

== Thai pop bands of Thai teen music labels (Lukkwad–pop) ==
- Kəmikəze (2007-) by RS

== Thai pop bands that are franchises of a Japanese brand ==
- BNK48 (2017-) (AKB48's sister group outside Japan)
- CGM48 (2019-) (AKB48's sister group outside Japan and sister group of BNK48)

== Thai artists who are members of Korean pop groups ==
- Natty (member of Kiss of Life)
- BamBam (member of GOT7)
- Ten (member of NCT)
- Minnie (member of (G)I-dle)
- Nichkhun (member of 2PM)
- Lisa (member of Blackpink)
- Sorn (member of CLC)
- Yorch (member of POW)
- Mint (member of Tiny-G)
- Hunter (member of Xikers)
- Pharita (member of Babymonster)
- Chiquita (member of Babymonster)

== Thai artists who are members of Chinese pop groups ==
- Sunnee (member of Rocket Girls)
- Nene (member of BonBon Girls)
- Nine (member of INTO1)
- Patrick (member of INTO1)

== See also ==
- Thai pop music
- Music of Thailand
