= Pimprapa Tangprabhaporn =

Thai actress, singer and model

- พิมประภา ตั้งประภาพร
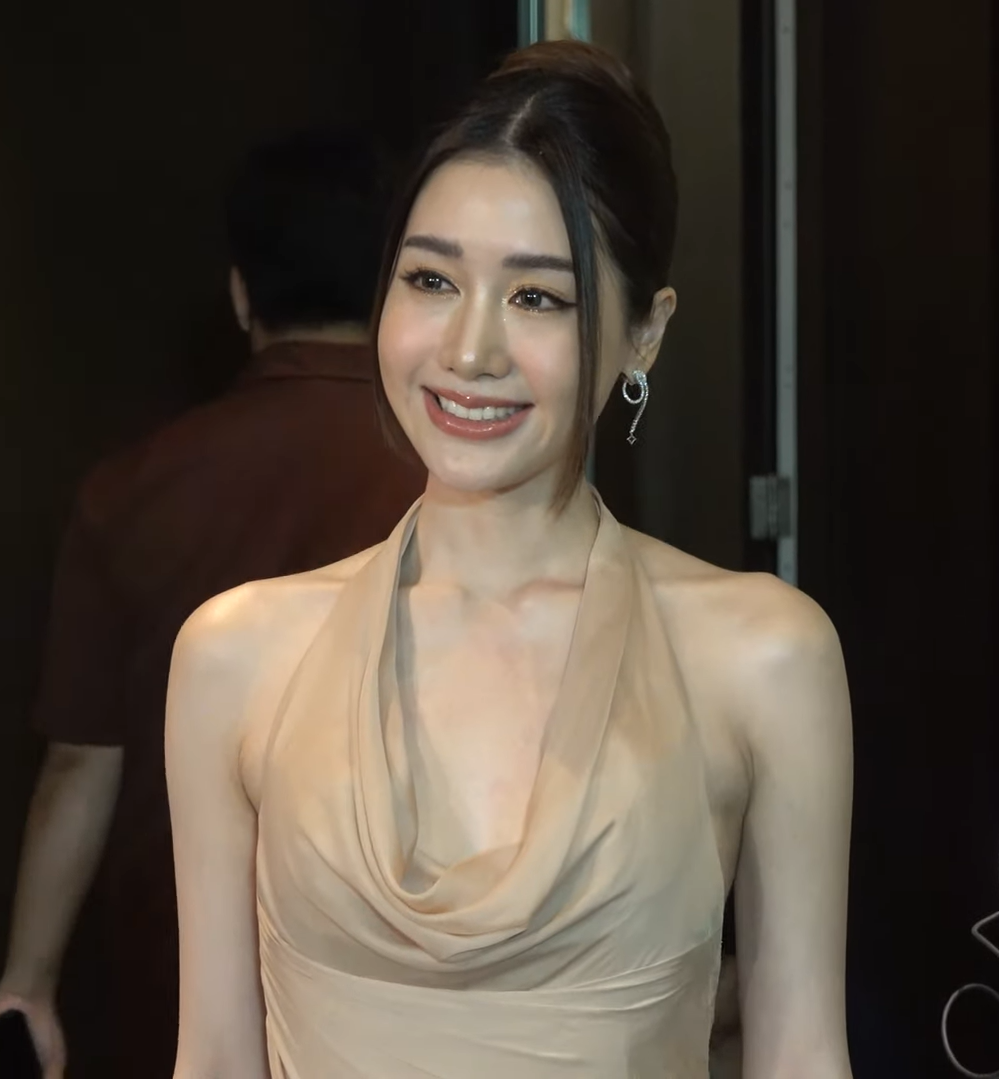
- Born: Pimprapa Tangprabhaporn; 10 October 1992 (age 33); Bangkok, Thailand
- Other name: Pim Pimprapa
- Education: Chulalongkorn University (Faculty of Architecture)
- Occupations: Actress; singer; model; MC; YouTuber
- Years active: 1998–present
- Agents: Channel 7 (2013–2020); Freelance (2020–present)
- Parents: Wichit Tangprapaporn (father); Sasikan Tangprapaporn (mother)
- Relatives: Ploypailin Thangprabhaporn (sister)
- Musical career
- Genre: Pop
- Instrument: Vocals
- Label: Kamikaze (2007–2011)

Pimprapa Tangprabhaporn (Thai: พิมประภา ตั้งประภาพร born 10 October 1992) is a Thai actress, singer and model. Her nickname is Pim. She was well known as Fasai in Thai drama series, Once Upon A Time in My Heart (Thai: กาลครั้งหนึ่งในหัวใจ).

== Biography ==
Pimprapa or Pim was born on 10 October 1992 in Bangkok, Thailand. She has 2 younger sisters (Pair and Ploy). She attended Heathfield International School and Bromsgrove International School and passed the grade 12 equivalent test (ITCSE) to study at the university. In 2014 Pim graduated with a Bachelor of Arts in Communication Design (Commde) from the Faculty of Architecture at Chulalongkorn University.

In 2000, Pim was first on screen, Look Mai Klai Ton, when she was 7 years old and then played many roles in many dramas such as Nueng Nai Suang, Khamin Kub Poon, Sai Lo Hit, Rang Ngao, etc. In 2007, Pim passed the audition to be a singer in Kamikaze music label which is affiliated with RS music company. She was a member of the girl group, Chilli White Choc which was in Lipz Project. After that 2 members of her group, Ink and Best, were quit due to expired contracts so the group was disbanded. However, her career continued, Pim was also in one of her successful projects, Sevendays, as the Tuesday girl, in 2009.

After the project, in 2010, Kamikaze formed new girl group from the disbanded girls in Lipz project, Pim Min and Jinny, the new group named Swee:D. Their song, "Sad Scene" (Thai: ฉากเรียกน้ำตา) was on top of Thai radio charts. Despite the moderate success, Pim decided not to renew her contract and left the music industry to focus on her university studies. In 2013, Pim was back to be an actress on a TV series again in Wiman Maprow, a comedy series on Channel 7 and signed as actors under Channel 7. She is currently freelance actors after ended her contract with Channel 7 in the end of 2020.

== Discography ==
=== Music ===
==== Lipz project ====
Detail of Album	Song Lists
Album : Lipz Project; Year : 2007; Record Label : Kamikaze (record label)	1. My Space (Waii, Chilli White Choc and Siska); 2. Chatsanova (Chilli White Choc); 3. Special Friend (Chilli White Choc); 4. Plian Pen Pee Chai (Chilli White Choc); 5. Tok Loom Ruk (Waii feat Pim, Ink, Chilli White Choc)

==== Sevendays ====
Detail of Album	Song Lists
Album : Seven Days; Year : 2009; Record Label : Kamikaze (record label)	1. Bha Wa Lok Luv; 2. Ja Mee Suk Wan Tee Pen Khong Chun Mhai; 3. Ying Klai Kan Ying Klun Jai (Pim feat Jinny, Jam); 4. Yhud Chun Tee (Jam feat Pim); 5. Yah Pleur Na (Waii feat Seven Days); 6. Mai Mee Wan Nhai Mai Chai Khong Ter

==== Swee:d ====
Detail of Album	Song Lists
Album : Swee:D; Year : 2010; Record Label : Kamikaze (record label)	1. Haam (Stop It); 2. Chak Reak Nam Ta (Sad Scene); 3. Plik Lock Tee Hau Jai (Unexpected)

==== Kamikaze ====
Album	Song Lists
Kamikaze: Year : 2007; Record Label : Kamikaze (record label)	Khud Jai
Forward To U: Year : 2008; Record Label : Kamikaze (record label)	Forward; Ruk Chun Reak Wa Ter
Friendship Never Ends: Year : 2009; Record Label : Kamikaze (record label)	Pleng Ruk; Bhoen Kan Chun Ruk Ter
KamiKaze Wave: Year : 2010; Record Label : Kamikaze (record label)	Kamikaze Wave

==== Ost. ====
Series	Song Lists
Ruk Lon Doi; Year : 2015	1. Hug Kan Kha-Nhad
Mon Ruk Pleng Phee Bork; Year : 2015	1. Yung Koi Chor Kaew (with Mac AF5); 2. Reeb Ma Rai Ngan Tau (with Chaiya Mitchai); 3. Aum-Ma-Bhat Hau Jai
Look Mai Laai Sonthaya; Year : 2018	1. Ngan Ten Rum Nai Kuen Phra Jun Tem Duang; 2. Wae La Tee Lhue
Poh Mod Chao Sanae; Year : 2018	1. Oh Le Oh Le Oh (with Donut Pattarapon); 2. Wate Mon Hang Rak (with other main roles)
Prom Pissawat; Year : 2020	1. MUSIC LOVER (manuscript Marsha Vadhanapanich Feat.Narongvit Techatanawat); 2. Rang Wam Jak Fah; 3. Kon Tee Kuk Rak (manuscript Bodyslam); 4. Jao Ying Nai Yay (manuscript Sunita Leetikun); 5. Sing khong (manuscript Klear); 6. Leik Dai Mai (manuscript Zaza)

==== Special song ====
Detail of Song	Song Lists
Ost.Song Meu Bhor(Special TV series for Father's Day); Year : 2015	1. Song Meu Bhor
Special song for Mother's Day; Year : 2016	1. Oun Ai Ar-Thorn
Dedicated song to the remembrance for King Bhumibol Adulyadej(King Rama IX); Year : 2016	1. Kaew Ta Nai Daung Jai
Special song for New Year Day; Year : 2017	1. Wae La Tee Sam Kan
Special song for the 10th anniversary of Save The World Project; Year : 2018	1. Pan Rak Duay Song Mue Rao

=== Music video ===
2007

- Na Krab Na Krab – Faye Fang Kaew
- MSN^_^ – Faye Fang Kaew
- Pak Dee Khee Ngao Oaw Tae Jai – Mila
- Tam Jai Pak – Knomjean

2008

- Phom Ruk Khun (I Luv U) – Faye Fang Kaew

2009

- Khon Ngao Kao Tum Kan – Nice 2 Meet U

2010

- Mai Ruk Ter(Love You No More) – Waii

=== Concerts ===
Concert	Date	Place	Artists
One-2-Call Freedom Zheza Zim Presents Kamikaze Live Concert	16 May 2009	Royal Paragon Hall	All Kamikaze
KamiKaze Wave Concert	26 June 2010	Indoor Stadium Hua Mark	All Kamikaze

== Filmography ==
=== TV series ===
Year	Title	Role	Network	Notes
1998	Kwam Song Jum Mai Huajai Derm		Channel 5	cameo
2000	Look Mai Klai Ton	Wanruedee (child)	Channel 7	
2000	Duj Fah Rai Dao	pafaan (child)	Channel 7	cameo
2000	Nang Sib Song	Pai (child)	Channel 7	
2001	Rang Ngao	Tom	Channel 3	
2001	Khamin Kub Poon	Paweena (child)	Channel 3	
2001	Nee Ruk	Athiti or Noo Aon (child)	Channel 5	Guest
2001	Song Kram Dok Ruk	Joobjang	Channel 7	
2001	Pin Prai	pornpid (child)	Channel 7	
2002	Khat-Ta-Korn Kam-Ma-Thep	Kreuorn (child)	Channel 7	
2002	Tam Ruk Tam Lah	Khai Kai	Channel 7	
2002	Nam Pooh	moddang (child)	Channel 7	
2002	Bodyguard Sao	praploy pannaree (child)	Channel 7	
2003	Sai Lo Hit	Dao Rueng (child)	Channel 3	
2003	Nah Tang see Chom Poo Pra Too see fah	Nin	Channel 3	
2003	Leud Khattiya	Princess Thibhayarat Daragumari (child)	Channel 5	
2005	Nueng Nai Saung	Khun Ying Kornkanok	Channel 3	
2007	Soi Sang Jun	Noi	Channel 3	
2013	Wiman Maprow	Namwhan	Channel 7	
2013	Yommaban Jao Kah	Rada	Channel 7	cameo - Episode: Nhee Barb (Debt Sin)
2015	Budsaba Ta Ruea	Chaichaba	Channel 7	
2015	Mon Ruk Pleng Phee Bork	Chokaew	Channel 7	
2015	Koo Prub Cha-Bub Hau Jai	Nara Boonnares	Channel 7	
2015	Fah Mee Ta	Punpun	Channel 7	Episode: Calling From Spirit
2015	Barn Sai Thong	M.C.Wimonsuda (Ying Aom)	Channel 7	
2016	Karn La Krung Nueng Nai Hau Jai	Fasai Tippayasart / Tien Botan	Channel 7	
2016	Honor Drama : Under Anthem	Klai Rung	Channel 7	Episode: Songs of The Sun (Pleng Hang Sang Tawan)
2018	Look Mai Laai Sonthaya	Duenpattra (Duen)	Channel 7	
2018	Por Mod Jao Sanae	Nissara (Noo ni)	Channel 7	
2020	Plaai Sungkeet	Mayakorn (May)	Channel 7	
2020	Prom Pissawat	Pantawan (Tawan)	Channel 7	
2020	Ngao Boon	Sita	Channel 7	
2022	Bad Beauty	Fah	One 31; AIS Play	
2022	Dong Dok Mai	Chitsamai	One 31	
2022	Mia Luang 2022	Ornin	Tencent Video	
2023	Fai Luang	Yodtian	Amarin TV	
2023	Club Friday The Series 14 Love & Belief	Nan	One 31	
2023	One Night Stand	Queen	One 31	
2024	Club Friday The Series: Hot Love Issue	Rin	One 31	
	Rai Rissaya		Amarin TV	

=== Movie ===
Year	Movie	Play as	Note
2001	Jun Dara	Wilairek Wisanan or Kaew (child)	
2003	Koo Tae Pa-Ti-Harn	Tan Nam (child)	

=== Musical theatre ===
Year	Musical	Play as	Note
2017	Soontaraporn The Musical (Episode: Khor Phob Nai Fhun)	May	restage in 2018

== Presenter ==
- 12 plus
- Lays (Loon Larn)
- Mitzubishi air conditioner
- Party snack with Seven Days
- G-Net 101 mobile phone in concept of Seven Color with Seven Days
- Meiji Paigen
- Mistine with Saran Siriluk
- TRESemme+Dove with Saran Siriluk
- Dina with Araya A.Hargate

== MC ==
Television

- 202 :

Online

- 2021 : - On Air YouTube:PimNiyom

== Awards and nominations ==
Year	Awards	Category	Nominated work	Result
2004	Milky Awards 2004	Rising Female TV Drama	Sai Lo Hit	Won
2009	Audition Music Awards 2009	Best New Artist	Seven Days (Kamikaze)	Won
2010	You Live MV Awards 2010	Sad MV of The Year	SWEE:D	Won
2015	Maya Awards 2015	Public Rising Star	Budsaba Ta Ruea	Nominated
2016	Kazz Awards 2016	Hot New Female Stars	—N/a	Nominated
2017	Daradaily The Great Awards 2016	Female Rising Star of The Year	Karn La Krung Nueng Nai Hau Jai	Won
2017	MThai Top Talk About 2016	Top Talk About Drama	Karn La Krung Nueng Nai Hau Jai	Nominated
2017	The 14th Kom Chad Luek Awards	Popular Actress	Karn La Krung Nueng Nai Hau Jai	Nominated
2018	Siam Ganesha	Outstanding Lead Actress	Look Mai Laai Sonthaya	Won
2019	Daradaily The Great Awards 2018	Hot Girl of The Year	—N/a	Won
2019	Maya Awards 2019	Popular Female Lead Actress	Look Mai Laai Sonthaya	Nominated
2019	Dara Inside Award, the 4th Nakarat Award	Favorite Actress of the Year	Look Mai Laai Sonthaya	Won
2019	Thailand Headlines Person of The Year Awards 2019	Outstanding Person of the Year in Culture and Entertainment	—N/a	Won
