= Timethai =

Thai singer, songwriter, and dancer

Dharmthai Plangsilp ธามไท แพลงศิลป์
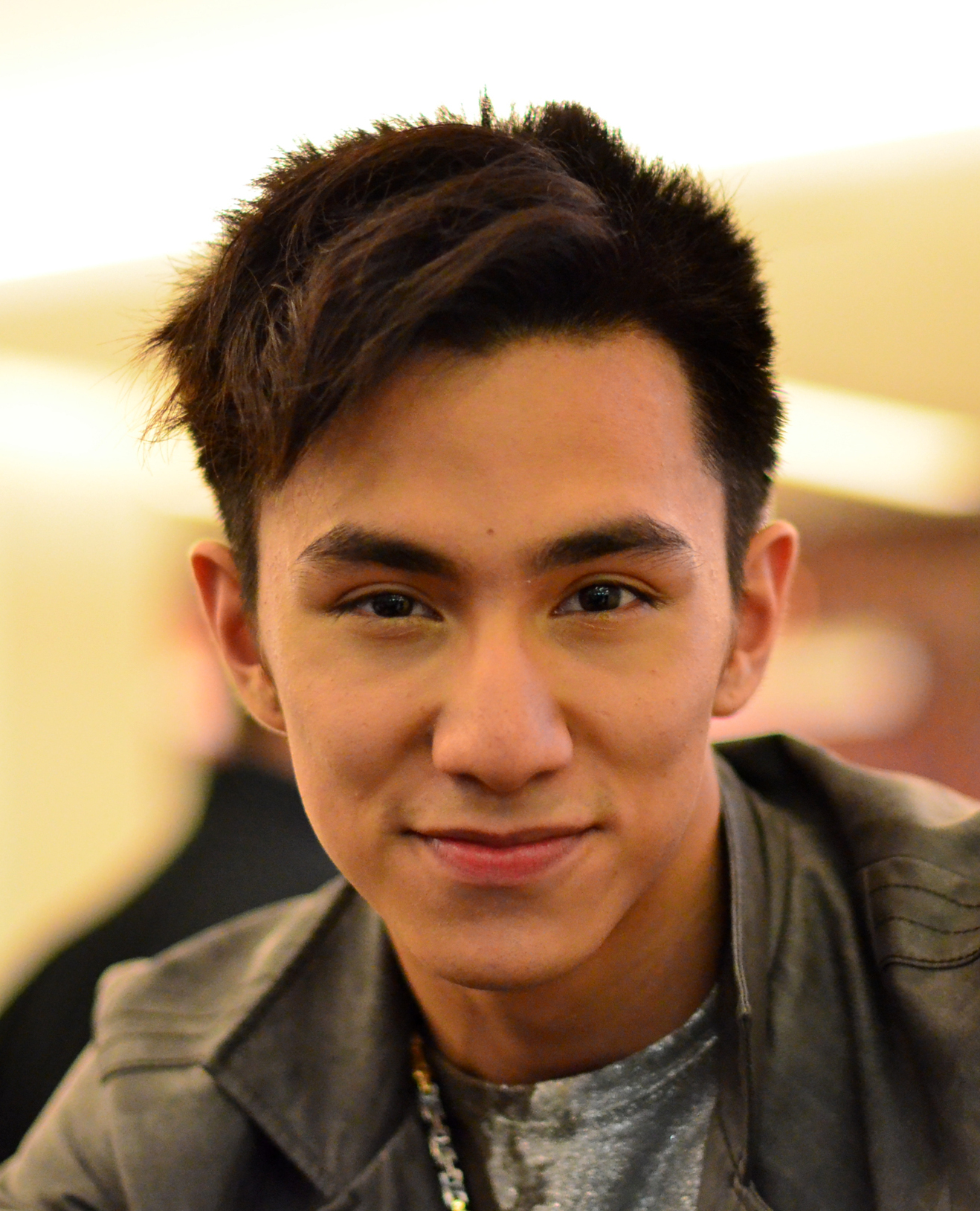
- Timethai in 2013

Background information
- Also known as: Timethai
- Born: Dharmthai Plangsilp; January 2, 1996 (age 30)
- Origin: Bangkok, Thailand
- Genres: Pop; R&B
- Occupations: Singer; YouTuber
- Years active: 2011–present
- Labels: Kamikaze; Yes!Music

Dharmthai Plangsilp (Thai: ธามไท แพลงศิลป์, RTGS: Thamthai Phlaengsin, pronounced [tʰāːm.tʰāj pʰlɛ̄ːŋ.sǐn]; born January 2, 1996), known professionally as Timethai (ธามไท, [tʰāːm.tʰāj]), is a Thai singer, songwriter, and dancer.

== Biography ==
Timethai was discovered in 2010 when Kamikaze's casting staff came across his YouTube videos, which had been uploaded by a channel named 'Dharmthai'. Timethai had been dancing and making choreographies since he was 7 years old; he was also able to play traditional Thai instruments such as the alto xylophone, alto bamboo xylophone and Kong Wong (Thai: ฆ้องวง). The casting staff offered Timethai a one-year singing and dancing training opportunity, and soon signed him to their label Kamikaze under RS Public Company Limited. He graduated with a bachelor's degree from Srinakarinwirot University.

Timethai's debut single, "No More", featuring Tomo, was released in December 2011. The music video reached more than 10,000,000 views on YouTube within 5 months. His second single "The End" was released in April 2012, charting at number one in Thailand after one month.

== Singles ==
Year	Singles	Album
2011	No More (รักกว่านี้ไม่มีอีกละ) Feat. Tomo K-Otic	TIMETHAI
2012	The End (จบมั้ย)	TIMETHAI
2012	Top Secret (มีอะไรอีกมั้ยที่ลืมบอก)	TIMETHAI
2012	Always Da One (ไม่มีทางไม่มีเธอ)	TIMETHAI
2013	In Time (มาได้จังหวะ)	DRIFE
2013	Blame It On Me (เจ็บคนเดียวก็พอ)	DRIFE
2013	Spy (แฟนพันธุ์ท้อ)	DRIFE
2013	All l Need (แค่อีกวันที่รักเธอ)	DRIFE
2014	Hidden Line (ชู้ทางไลน์) Feat. กระแต อาร์สยาม	DRIFE
2015	อย่าหาว่าฉันร้าย	
2015	ไม่เป็นไร	
2017	Don't Judge Me	
2018	Feelin with Twopee Southside and Notep	
2018	It's Time Feat. หวาย	
2019	Impossible	
2019	Never Know	
2020	THAITIANA	
2020	RnB	
2020	Sofa	
2020	เมื่อไหร่	
2020	สำคัญตัวผิด	
2020	ส่งมา	
2020	เสียใจ	
2020	เพื่อนที่ร่วมงาน	
2020	กอดสุดท้าย	
2022	ไม่มีใคร	TIMELESS
2022	แค่อยากรู้	TIMELESS
2022	ไม่เหมือนใคร	TIMELESS
2022	ขี้เกียจฟัง	TIMELESS
2022	คืนนี้	TIMELESS
2022	สับไม่ไหว	
2022	ยังไม่ชิน (Not Used To)	
2023	SPIDERMAN	
2023	คุยไร (Kuy Rai)	
2023	เปิดใจไม่เปิดตัว	
2023	ที่ยืน	
2023	Better Without Me	
2024	Hit Me Up	

== Studio albums ==
Album details	Track listing
TIMETHAI: Released: 2012; Label: Kamikaze; Formats: Mini Album	1. No More (รักกว่านี้ไม่มีอีกละ); 2. The End (จบมั้ย); 3. Top Secret (มีอะไรอีกมั้ยที่ลืมบอก); 4. Always Da One (ไม่มีทางไม่มีเธอ)
DRIFE: Released: 2013; Label: Kamikaze; Formats: -	1. In Time (มาได้จังหวะ); 2. Blame It On Me (เจ็บคนเดียวก็พอ); 3. Spy (แฟนพันธุ์ท้อ); 4. All l Need (แค่อีกวันที่รักเธอ)

== Concerts ==
Title	Date	Venue
Biscuit Gap presents FFK AHOLIC CONCERT (Guest)	May 26, 2012	Royal Paragon Hall, Siam Paragon, Bangkok
KAMIKAZE THE 5th DESTINY CONCERT	October 13, 2012	Royal Paragon Hall, Siam Paragon, Bangkok
KAMIKAZE K Fight Concert	October 13, 2013	Royal Paragon Hall, Siam Paragon, Bangkok

=== Television dramas ===
- 20 () (/Ch.) as ()

=== Television series ===
- 2022 Catch Me Baby (เซียนสับราง) (Bearcave Studio/WeTV) as Ben (เบน) (Cameo)
- 2026 Gelboys 2 (ตกอยู่ในสถานะติ่งแฟน) as older version of FourMod

=== Television sitcom ===
- 20 Pen Tor (เป็นต่อ ตอน) (The One Enterprise/One 31) as () () (Cameo)

=== Film ===
- 20 () () as ()

=== Music video appearance ===
- 20 () Ost. - (/YouTube:)

=== Master of Ceremony: MC ===
Year	Thai title	Title	Network	Notes	With
2020–present	ช่วงติดผู้		YouTube:Four Sakonrut		Sakolrat Wornurai
