= Anan Anwar =

Thai singer, traceur and actor (born 1986)

Anan Anwar (อนัน อันวา)
- Born: 15 September 1986 (age 39); Bangkok, Thailand
- Education: University of New South Wales (UNSW)
- Occupation: Singer
- Years active: 1999–2003
- Height: 1.68 m (5 ft 6 in)

Anan Anwar (Thai: อนัน อันวา, RTGS: Anan Anwa; born 15 September 1986) is a Thai singer, traceur, and actor. He is the fourth child of his Scottish mother and Thai Indonesian father. His older brother Joni Anwar was a member of the musical group Raptor.

Anan gained celebrity as a solo singer with the record company RS. He released his first album Anan in 1999 and followed it up with Fast Foot in 2000. Because he gained popularity with his hit song Talueng (ตะลึง), he received the lead role in the television drama Phom Ma Kap Pra (ผมมากับพระ, I'm with the Monks) on Channel 7. In 2001, he acted in Khrob Khrua Tua O. (ครอบครัวตัว อ.) on Channel 3 and later had many roles in various shows for teenagers. In 2002, he starred in the movie Kao Phra Khum Khrong (เก้า พระคุ้มครอง, Nine Warrior Monks). Anan is also a notable traceur from Sydney Parkour. He is also a key member in the founding of Team Farang.

== Career ==
=== Dramas ===
- ครอบครัวตัว อ. (Khrob Khrua Tua O.)
- ผมมากับพระ (Phom Ma Kap Pra, I'm with the Monks)
- กระตุกหนวดเสือ (Kra Thuk Nwot Suea)

=== Filmography ===
- เก้า พระคุ้มครอง (Kao Phra Khum Khrong, Nine Warrior Monks)

=== Discography ===
- Anan Anwar (1999)
- Fast Foot (2000)
- Earthshake (2001)
- Faen Phan Thu (2003)
- wonder boy (อัลบั้มรวมฮิต)
- Most Wanted (อัลบั้มรวมฮิต)
- พิเศษ Celebration (Phiset Celebration, Special Celebration)
