= Joni Anwar =

Thai singer and actor

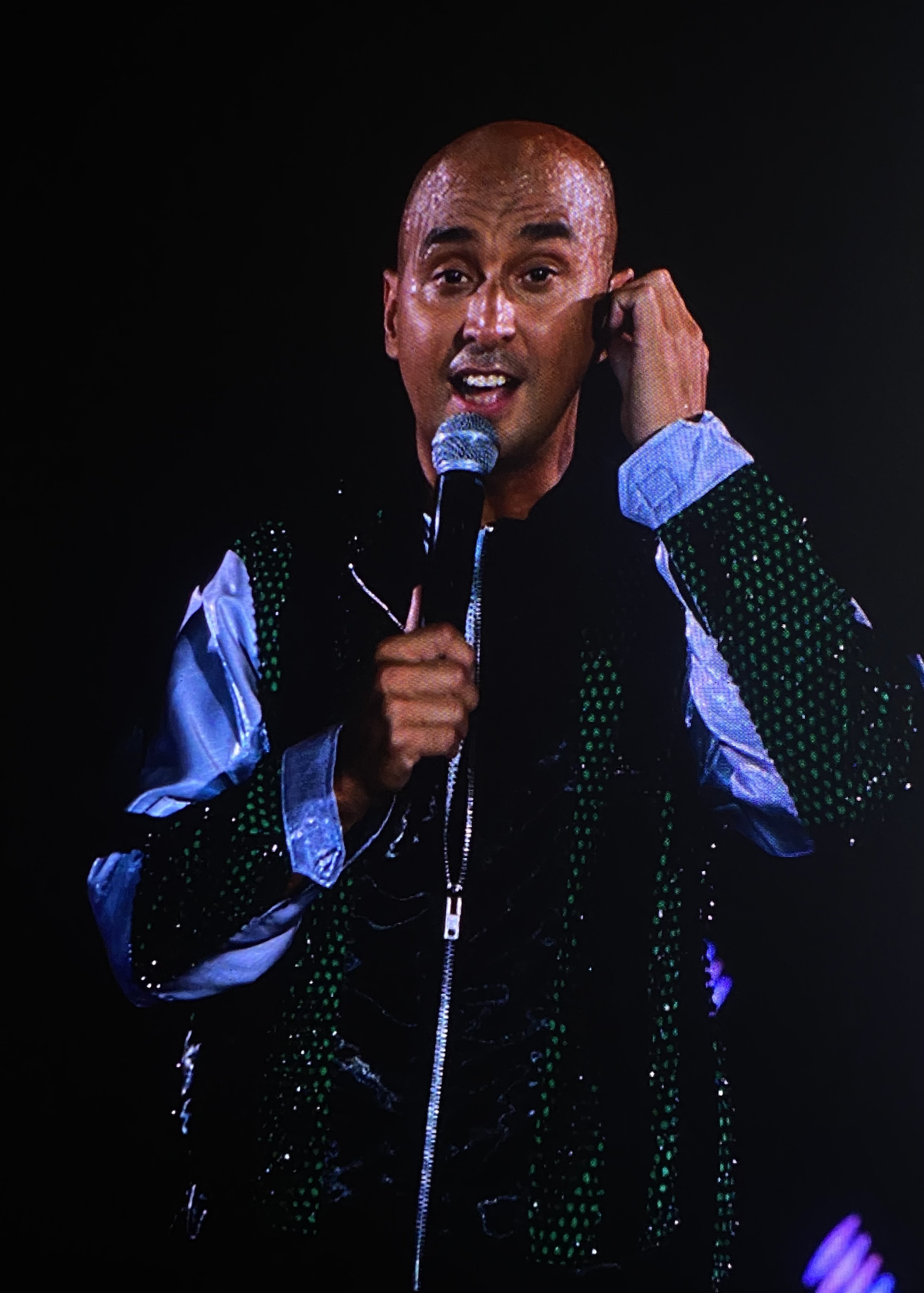
- Anwar in 2023

Background information
- Also known as: Joni Raptor
- Born: 30 August 1981 (age 44); Bangkok, Thailand
- Genres: Pop
- Occupations: Singer; actor
- Years active: 1994–present
- Formerly of: Raptor, Katsue

Joni Anwar, also known as Joni Raptor (born 30 August 1981), is a Thai singer and actor.

== Early life and education ==
Anwar was born in Bangkok, to an Indonesian father and a Scottish mother. He graduated from Bangkok Patana School in 2000, after which he went on to study business in South Hampton, New York in the United States.

== Career ==
Anwar started his career making television commercials for Ovaltine, Bata and Krissadanakorn before signing a record deal with RS Promotion.

In 1994, Anwar began his musical career in the pop dance duo Raptor with Louis Scott. After the group disbanded in 1998, Joni contributed to his younger brother's self-titled debut album, Anan Anwar. Not long after that, Joni began a solo career and released three albums: Bad Boy, Freeman and Outtaspace.

=== Raptor ===
Anwar and Louis Scott were 12 and 13 years old when they released their self-titled debut album, Raptor, in August 1994. They were the youngest singers in Thailand at that time. The duo's name was inspired by the famous two dinosaurs in the kitchen scene at the end of the movie Jurassic Park, and the duo liked the suggestion of "rap" in "raptor."

"Kid Thung Ter" (Missing you) was a big hit. "Super Hero" and "Kum Wa Peun" (The word friend) also charted. Their album sold over a million copies.

On 24 September 1994, Raptor participated in a joint concert at MBK Hall with senior boy band Hijack, debuting a collaboration track entitled "Yha Kid Wa Ter Mai Mee Krai" (Don't think you have no one). The song was later released on one of Hijack's greatest hits albums. On 17 November 1995, they performed a concert with other RS artists at Amy Sports Stadium, debuting their song "Kow Kew," which was then featured on Hot Collection 4.

After releasing their collaboration album The Next, Anwar and Scott released their fourth studio album, Raptor Goodbye. This was supposedly their last album together before they parted ways. "Sayonara Goodbye", which features on the album, is a Thai cover of "Sayonara" performed by Pat Kirby.

The famous songs were "Sayonara Goodbye," "Oh Yes," "In My Heart," "Go Go Go!," and "Ruu Tao Bang Mai." Raptor Monchos Dance Concert, on 4 July 1998 at MBK Hall, was the biggest concert in this album but was not the last concert, as they continued to tour around Thailand throughout July and August 1998.

The Raptor's last album, The Memory (May 1998), is a collection of their hits from all of their albums, along with remixes and a special song, "Kwam Shong Jum (The memory)."

Goodbye Concert Sayonara Raptor in 1998 at MBK Hall was their last live performance.

=== Solo career ===
Anwar's debut solo album, Bad Boy, was released in May 2000.

Anwar worked together with Montonn Jira and composed a song "Go Now," which received the FAT AWARD: RECORD OF THE YEAR AWARD from 104.5 FAT Radio in 2002. This song appeared on the album Freeman.

Anwar recorded "Yak Hai Ru Wa Rak Ter" (I want you to know that I love you) for the movie Sexphone, which became a big hit.

His song "Outtaspace" also received the FAT AWARD: RECORD OF THE YEAR AWARD in 2003.

=== Katsue ===
Anwar formed Katsue with fellow Thai teen idol, Montonn Jay Jira.

== Filmography ==
=== Film ===
- Lok Tung Bai Hai Nai Kon Deaw (Romantic Blue)
- Dek Ra Bead [Extreme Game] - Joni's first movie. He was one of six lead actors and actresses. Joni portrayed Johny, a pizza shop owner's son who falls in love with Song. The movie earned 43 million baht.
- Ahingsa-Jikko mee gam - Credited as Joni Anwar in this 2005 film, Joni starred as the brainy owner of an after-hours rave-party bar.

=== Television ===
- ละครเรื่อง บ้านสีขาวกับดาวดวงเดิม
- ละครเรื่อง หนึ่งฟ้าหลังคาเดียว

== Personal life ==
Anwar enjoys all kinds of sports, especially water sports. He won the third prize in wakeboarding at the X Games Thailand 1998. In addition, Anwar has participated in the X Games in Phuket.

Anwar attended Bangkok Patana School in Bangkok, Thailand. Louis Scott attended the same school.

He has a younger brother, Anan, who is also a singer and an actor.

== Discography ==
=== With Raptor ===
- WAAB Boys

They started the WAAB Boys album by appearing on MTV Asia. "Yah Pud Leay" (Don't speak) was the biggest hit in this album.

- Day SHOCK

They wore contact lenses with a different color in each eye: one is blue and one is green.

- The Next

A special album, they worked with other singers such as Dome Pakorn Lum, James Ruengsak, JR Kittikulwong, Oil Thana Suttikamol, Lift, and Voy.

- RAPTOR...GOODBYE (May 1998)
- The Memory (May 1998)

=== Solo artist ===
- Anan Anwar (1999)
- BAD BOY (12 May 2000) – Joni Anwar's debut solo album.
- MISSION 4 PROJECT
- THE CELEBRATION
- FREEMAN – Joni worked together with Montonn Jira and composed a song "Go Now" which received FAT AWARD: RECORD OF THE YEAR AWARD from 104.5 FAT Radio in the year 2002.
- DANCE MARATHON EXPO
- WHAT'S Love
- Joni REFLEXION
- OST. Sexphone/คลื่นเหงา/สาวข้างบ้าน – Anwar sings "Yak Hai Ru Wa Rak Ter" (I want you to know that I love you) for the movie Sexphone, which turned out to be a big hit.
- OUTTASPACE – Joni composed a song "Outtaspace" which received FAT AWARD: RECORD OF THE YEAR AWARD from 104.5 FAT Radio in the year 2003.
