= MTV Thailand =

Thai television channel

- Country: Thailand
- Broadcast area: Thailand
- Headquarters: Bangkok, Thailand

Programming
- Picture format: 1080i (HDTV); 480i (SDTV)

Ownership
- Owner: MCOT, appleTool and Viacom
- Sister channels: VH1, Nickelodeon

History
- Launched: 1 November 2001; 24 years ago (original); 1 September 2013; 13 years ago (relaunch)
- Closed: 16 May 2011; 15 years ago (original); 31 August 2016; 10 years ago (relaunch)
- Replaced by: MTV (Asian TV channel)

Links
- Website: http://www.mtvthailand.com/

MTV Thailand was a 24-hour music and entertainment channel owned by VIMN Asi Pacific, a division of Viacom. This channel broadcasts both Thai and international music programs as well as a youth lifestyle T.V. series. The channel ended its transmission in 2011. In 2013, Viacom International Media Networks (VIMN), intended to bring back MTV Thailand with supports from AppleTool Co and MCOT Plc. On 1 September 2013, MTV Thailand officially returned to TrueVisions, replacing Channel V Thailand, before moving to CTH in January 2016.

== VJs ==
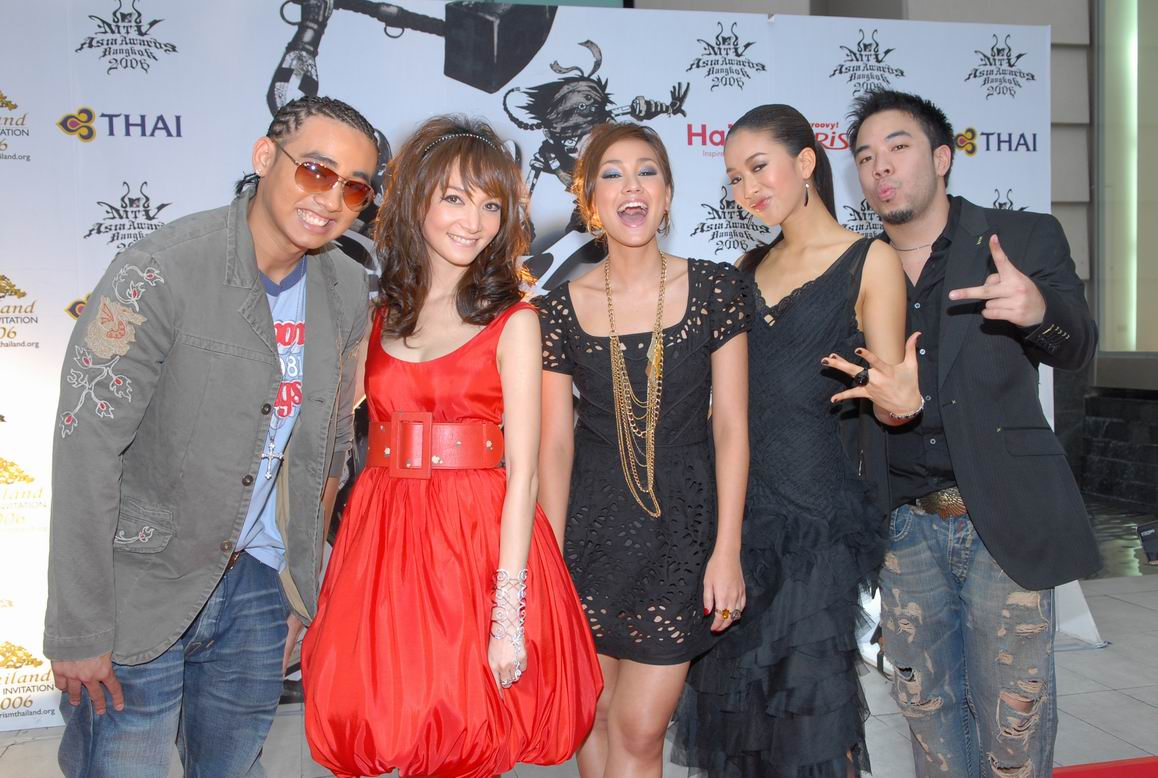
VJs of MTV Thailand

- John Delcastillo (John)
- Angie Hastings (Gie)
- Rowena Kennet (Row)
- Nattapol Liyavanija (Tye)
- Oz
- Janesuda Parnto (Jane)
- Suppakarn Pordpai (Jay)
- Alexandra Sawaetwong (Alex)
- Sean
- Jane Sriprayul (Waaw)
- Annie Supsermsri (Annie)
- Poomjai Tangsanga (Poom)
- Garanick Tongpiam (Nicky)
- Michele Waagaard (Chele)
- Woody

== MTV Thailand highlights of the month ==
- Arert Altist
- Artist Focus
- Artist of the Month
- Buzzworthy
- Hot
- MTV This Is

== MTV on FreeTV ==
MTV News logo

MTV School Attack Logo

MTV News was presented in Thai language on TITV (free TV). It was first aired on November 2, 2007, Friday night, 00.30-01.00. MTV News is presented by VJ Nicky VJ Poom and VJ Waew.

- Headrines
- Local Stories
- Oversea Reports
- MTV News is aired every Friday night at 00.30-01.00

MTV News was unavailable after TITV was shut down and replaced by TPBS (Thailand Public Broadcasting Service).

MTV School Attack is performed surprise by Thai pop star at school. It is aired every Thursday at 17.05-17.30 on TV5. It is presented by VJ Poom and VJ Jay.

== Trivia ==
- MTV Thailand was already one of the host country when MTV Asia Awards was held twice except in 2005 when the 2004 Asian tsunami happened.
