= Kamikaze (record label) =

Thai record label owned by RS Public Company Limited, founded 2007

- Parent company: RS Public Company Limited
- Founded: 2007
- Founder: Sudhipong Vatanajang
- Status: Active
- Genre: Thai pop; Teen pop
- Country of origin: Thailand
- Location: Bangkok
- Official website: www.kamikazemusic2020.com

Kamikaze (Thai: กามิกาเซ่), stylized as kəmikəze, is a Thai record label owned by RS Public Company Limited. It was founded in 2007, and was originally managed by that time RS executive producer Sudhipong Vatanajang. The label focused on young artists and catered to a target audience aged 10 to 17 years, as part of RS's restructuring plan to have multiple sublabels focusing on specific audience segments. Some of its best known early artists include Four–Mod, Faye Fang Kaew, Neko Jump and K-Otic. RS also launched a website, zheza.com, to serve as a community site for its target group.

Kamikaze produced several hits in its early years, and by its fifth year, had 32 artists under its umbrella. However, Sudhipong departed the company in 2010, and the label gradually lost most of its original artists as they outgrew their intended demographic. The label's management also changed direction, attempting to target more provincial audiences in addition to its originally urban audience—in 2013, Kamikaze group 3.2.1's single "Splash Out" featured singer Bitoey from Kamikaze's sister luk thung label R Siam, and its music video became a viral sensation. However, while the label continued to add new singers to its lineup, they failed to generate the same level of reception, and the label eventually became inactive, amidst the decline experienced by the wider music industry. In September 2017, a rumour circulated online that Kamikaze had closed down. This was initially denied by some reports, but the label later became inactive and was regarded to have unofficially ceased operations in 2017, however, it resumed operations in 2020 in the midst of the COVID-19 pandemic in Thailand.

On 13.11.2020, it was announced through their YouTube channel that the label will make its comeback on 24.11.2020.

Kamikaze came back with four new songs and artists. 'เพื่อน...ใหม่ (朋友区)' by UTTER, 'ดีด (You Drive Me Crazy)' by Gracy, 'Sweetie Shy Boy' by Freshybii and 'My Sissy' by KKP. The songs and artists have been generally well received by viewers and fans. It is speculated no old artists will return to the label.

Most social media have been updated to include the new artists, but the website does not seem to have been touched.

== Background ==
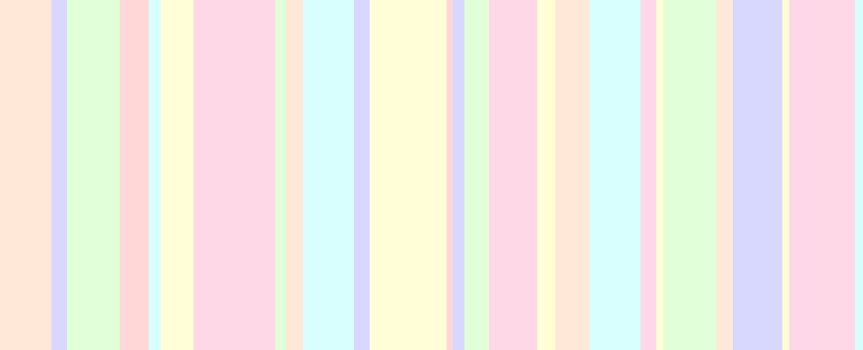
rainbow symbol of kamikaze

Kamikaze was inspired by Kpop, Jpop, Western pop and American pop. Back in 2006, when the era of rock music was growing. Hip hop music is climbing the charts continuously. One day, Nanny Girly Berry came to meet Afu “band producer” With bringing Korean music CDs The front cover wrote the name of the artist TVXQ. She gave it to him to remember that Nanny was especially excited and exhilarated by this group of artists. At first glance Afu “band producer” felt that this band was very similar to the early RS boy bands. Even listening to it was interesting. it's very good a pop songs Like going back to the era * NSYNC or Backstreet Boys, he think that this type of music may be one of teenagers are interested in, Including at that time he was interested in Morning Musume, a Japanese idol group. So he want to combine all of them to create a new RS project, Therefore consulted with the supervisor Sudhipong Vatanajang, Melodiga management director and Deputy Managing Director of RS's music business, wants to make a pop group with many members. And mainly focus on the Pre-Teen market,

Around the same time, Athit Lertrakamongkol, another producer who had grown weary of the music industry, sought to move into a new area and proposed an online platform aimed at teenagers, a demographic that was increasingly active online. Sudhipong, who believed that any entry into the youth market should be undertaken on a large scale, combined the two projects into a single proposal and presented it to the company’s executives.

In fact, RS is a music entertainment that has been working on teen music since the beginning. From the gathering of stars to the '90s teen idols, there are many teen idols such as Touch, Raptor, Lift-Oil and The X-Venture, as the head of the 90's teen idols procession of thaipop and continued to be sent to D2B, Girly Berry. Only the past, the marketing direction is focused on the broad market. Or if drilling into groups, it will be divided according to music such as pop, rock, jazz rather than divided according to consumer behavior.

But with a very different business model, his project could not be approved at that time, Until one month passed Sudhipong went to talk to Kriengkai Chetchotisak "the owner of RS" that "It's like Lift-Oil Boyscout 2007." These words made him smile and made him to approve this project.

== Current artists ==
- Gracy (Pattanan Amnatcharoenying)
- Kkp (Kanapat Pinvanichkul)
- Utter (Pannawat Traiisarawit)
- Freshybii (Nathasa Chavalitporn)

== Former artists ==
=== First generation ===
- Fang (Dhanundhorn Neerasingh), member of Faye Fang Kaew
- Kaew (Jarinya Sirimongkolsakul), member of Faye Fang Kaew
- Faye (Pornpawee Neerasingh), member of Faye Fang Kaew and former member of Seven Days
- Four (Sakolrat Woraurai), former member of Four–Mod
- Mod (Napapat Wattanakamolwut), former member of Four–Mod and Seven days2
- Jongbae (Park Jongbae), former member of K-Otic
- Kenta (Kenta Tsuchiya), former member of K-Otic
- Tomo (Visava Thaiyanont), former member of K-Otic
- Poppy (Panu Chiragun), former member of K-Otic
- Koen (Pataradanai Setsuwan), former member of K-Otic
- Jam (Charattha Imraporn), former member of Neko Jump and Seven Days
- Noey (Warattha Imraporn), former member of Neko Jump and Seven Days2
- Jinny (Aimsiga Chotivichit), former member of Chilli White Choc and SWEE:D and Seven Days and Seven days2
- Best (Rataporn Thipmontri), former member of Chilli White
- Pim (Pimprapa Tangprabhaporn), former member of Chilli White and SWEE:D and Seven Days
- Ink (Waruntorn Paonil), former member of Chilli White Choc
- Knomjean (Kunlamas Limpawutwaranon)
- Mila (Jamila Panpinij), former member solo artist of Kamikaze and Seven Days
- Min (Phatida Wongkhamwan), former member of Siska and SWEE:D and Seven Days
- Jam (Chonlathorn PrayaRungroj), former member of Siska
- Waii (Panyarisa Thienprasit), former member solo artist of Kamikaze and Seven Days
- Payu (Payu Clark)
- Ning (Piampiti Hatthakitkosol), former member of The Piams
- Ping (Piiamrak Hathakitkosol), former member of The Piams

=== Second generation ===
- Timethai (Dharmthai Plangsilp)
- Min (Min Yongsuvimol)
- Mind (Krittiya Wuthirunprida), former member of Kiss Me Five
- Kitty (Chicha Amatayakul), former member of Kiss Me Five
- Gail (Natcha Eksangkul), former member of Kiss Me Five
- Bambi (Pakakanya Charoenyos), former member of Kiss Me Five and Seven Days2
- Bow (Maylada Susri), former member of Kiss Me Five and Seven Days2
- Poppy (Chatchaya Songcharoen), former member of 3.2.1 and Seven Days2
- TJ (Jirayut Phaloprakarn), former member of 3.2.1
- Gavin (Gavin Duval), former member of 3.2.1
- April (Napasornada Kanjanacharoen), former member of ABQueen
- Boom (Thanawan Wongsanguan), former member of ABQueen and Seven Days2
- Pichy (Phichy Sirawongprasert), former member of X-I-S
- Gyeongtae (Park Gyeongtae), former member of X-I-S
- Kang (Kang Worakorn Sirisorn), former member of X-I-S
- Kevin (Dejphadung Wong), former member of X-I-S
- Kwang (Phakaphon Loijirakun), former member of X-I-S
- Jiho (Kim Jiho), former member of X-I-S
- Guy (Glamaii Michael), former member of Fact U
- Taishi (Taishi Hasegawa), former member of Fact U
- Joe (Naphat Nitikornkul), former member of Fact U
- Ham (Napat Worawongwasu), former member of Fact U
- Bew (Narongdej Kulkietchai), former member of Fact U
- Kat (Sonha Singha), former member of Kat–Pat
- Pat (Phiraya Singha), former member of Kat–Pat

=== Third generation ===
- Angie (Thiticha Sombatpiboon)
- Cnan (Natthaporn Rungrungsri)
- Creamy (Chatsuda Loaniti)
- Pide (Phonthaphum Sumonwarangkun), former member of Pide-Magorn
- Magorn (Phuwaphat Thamanucha), former member of Pide-Magorn
- Porsche (Sivakorn Adulsuttikul), former member of V.R.P
- Peter (Cholapatr Jeepetch), former member of V.R.P
- Pleum (Nachkhun Nuttanon), former member of V.R.P
- Thank You (Sinchanok Klaitae)
- Third (Lapat Ngamchaweng)
- Marc (Thanat Rattanasiriphan)
- May (Worawalun Wongaree)
- Mind (Nannaphas Wongaree)
- Isabelle (Sasitha Kunwattanaphan)
- Neko (Nerunchara Lertprasert)
- Ploy Chen (Naphatsorn Chen)
- Part (Chaitach Chiwamongkhon)
- Green (Green Piyapoom Thanawanittrakoon)

== See also ==
- List of Thai pop artists
- Thai pop music
