= Gena Desouza =

Thai singer and actress

- ณัฐชา เดอ
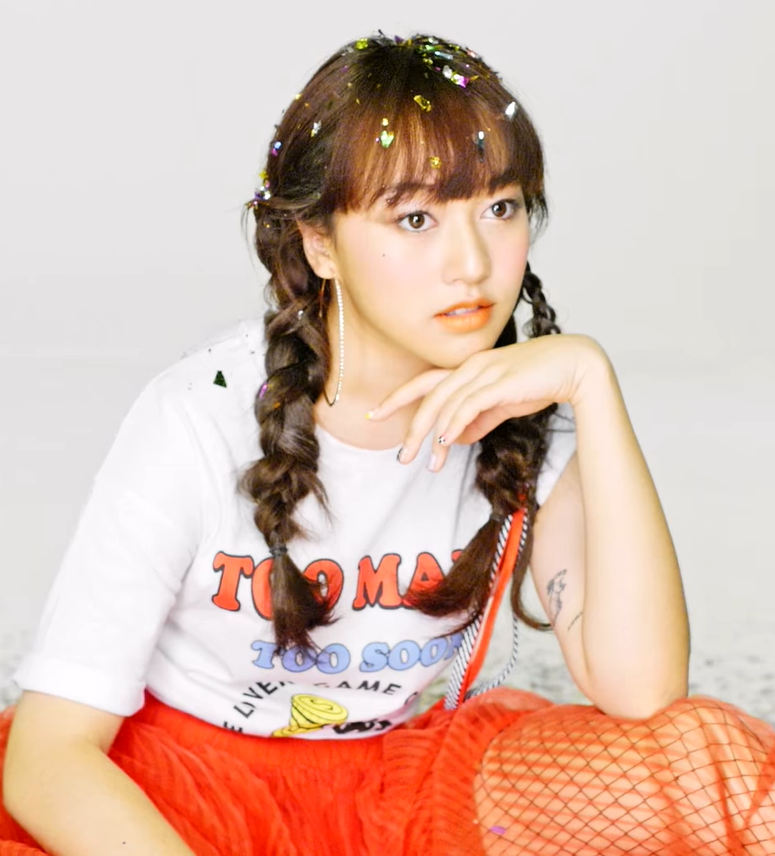
- Gena in 2017
- Born: Natcha Desouza; May 2, 1997 (age 29); Bangkok, Thailand
- Occupations: Actress; singer; YouTuber
- Years active: 2014–Present
- Musical career
- Also known as: Gena D.
- Genres: Pop
- Labels: Classy Records; MBO

Gena Desouza (Thai: จีน่า เดอซูซ่า) is a Thai singer and actress. She is known for appearing in GMM Grammy's MBO The Audition project of MBO Teen Entertainment. She released her debut single "Drunk" in 2017.

== Early life and education ==
Gena Desouza, born Natcha Desouza, was born on May 2, 1997. She graduated from Mater Dei School. At present, studying bachelor's degree at the Faculty of Communication Arts in Advertising at Bangkok University.

== Career ==
Gena began her career in the music industry with the stage name Jeena D. by posting cover songs socialcam. Classy Records discovered her clips and was approached to participate in the album Matters in February in 2013, singing in the song "อาย (Shy)".

After that, Gena participated in MBO The Audition project. She was chosen by Sakonrut Woraurai, and later became one of the MBO artists under GMM Grammy. Gena officially debuted under GMM Grammy with the debut single "Drunk (จริงๆมันก็ดี)".

== Discography ==
=== Singles ===
==== As lead artist ====
Date	Title	Details	Ref.
14/09/17	"จริงๆมันก็ดี (Drunk) "	Song : จริงๆมันก็ดี (Drunk) Artist : Gena Desouza; Music by : RULE TEEN; Lyrics : Piyawat Meekrue (Poo 25 Hours); Composed : Pratheep Siri-issaranan (Four 25 Hours); Arranged : Pratheep Siri-issaranan; Executive Producer : Poonsak Jaturaboon (Aof Big Ass); Produced by Pratheep Siri-issaranan; All Instruments : Pratheep Siri-issaranan; Engineered & Recorded by Pratheep Siri-issaranan at Happy Hippo studio Mixed & Mastered by Rawee Kangsanarak	
14/12/17	เรื่องของชั้น (M.Y.B.)	Song : เรื่องของชั้น (M.Y.B.) Artist : Gena Desouza Music by : RULE TEEN Lyrics : Piyawat Meekrue (Poo 25 Hours); Composed : Pratheep Siri-issaranan (Four 25 Hours); Arranged : Pratheep Siri-issaranan; Executive Producer : Poonsak Jaturaboon (Aof Big Ass); Produced by Pratheep Siri-issaranan; All Instruments : Pratheep Siri-issaranan; Engineered & Recorded by Pratheep Siri-issaranan at Happy Hippo studio	

==== As featured artist ====
Year	Title	Artist	Album	Ref.
2014	"อาย"		Matters in February by Various Artists	
2016	"วัดใจ" (Test one's willingness); *Soundtrack of MBO The Idol Game หน้าใหม่ พร้อมเกิด	Various artists of MBO		
2016	"พ่อเล่าให้ฟัง" (The father recounted); *Songs to honor His Majesty King Bhumibol Adulyadej.	Various artists of MBO		
2017	"มาม้าบอก" (Mama told)	Ammy The Bottom Blues feat. Jeena D./Emma/Pam MBO		

=== Soundtrack appearances ===
Year	Title	Notes	Ref.
2017	"ความลับในใจ" (Secret in mind); *Original soundtrack of the series "รัก/ชั้น/นัย #TheUnderwear"	With Emika Grant, Pemika Suktawee	
2017	"นาฬิกาตาย" (The dead clock); *Original soundtrack of the series "รัก/ชั้น/นัย #TheUnderwear"		
2021	"I Dare You" (); *Original soundtrack of the series "บุพเพร้อยร้าย #"		

== Endorsements ==
Year	Advertising	With	Notes	Ref.
2020	Fun-O ฟันโอ คุกกี้แซนวิช	Perawat Sangpotirat		

== Filmography ==
=== Television ===
Year	Series	Character	Ref.
2016	เป็ดIdol	Misoh / Mamoung (Meesuk)	
2017	รักชั้นนัย	Jeans	
2017	Bangkok รัก Stories ตอน Please	Jeans	

=== Hosting ===
- 2019 : Stalk me ep.1 On Air YouTube:GENA DESOUZA
