= MBO (record label) =

Thai record label

- Parent company: GMM Music
- Founded: October 2015; 9 years ago
- Genre: Pop; Dance-pop; Pop rock; Nu metal
- Country of origin: Thailand

MBO (Thai: เอ็มบีโอ) is a Thai record label and a subsidiary of GMM Grammy that focuses on pop, dance-pop and pop rock music genre. The label's current acts include Jidapa Siribunchawan (Jida) and Thanabordee Jaiyen (Peem).

== History ==
MBO was formed in late 2015 as GMM Grammy aimed to expand their music content and increase their music revenue by targeting more teenage audiences. It also aimed to be Thailand's leading youth entertainment platform with a greater focus on the artist than on production according to Wichian Rerkpaisan who was then GMM Grammy's executive vice president for music production and promotion. In terms of promotion, MBO is focused on tapping social media channels where most of the younger audience are.

Hathai Sarawutpaiboon, who was with Kamikaze prior to joining MBO, previously served as its managing director. She later moved to 4Nologue where she helped in forming the Thai boy group Nine by Nine.

== Roster ==
=== Current acts ===
- Jidapa Siribunchawan (Jida)
- Thanabordee Jaiyen (Peem)
- Pamiga Sooksawee (Pam)
- Yanin Opassataworn (Ninna)
- Niwirin Limkangwalmongkol (Bambam)
