= Ruangsak Loychusak =

Thai actor and singer (born 1978)

Ruangsak Loychusak เรืองศักดิ์ ลอยชูศักดิ์
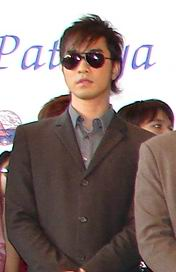
- Loychusak c. 2008

Background information
- Also known as: James Ruangsak; Iron Bones Singer; James, The Iron Bones
- Born: 9 March 1978 (age 48); Cha-uat, Nakhon Si Thammarat, Thailand
- Origin: Bangkok, Thailand
- Genres: Pop; pop dance; luk thung
- Occupations: Singer; actor
- Instruments: Vocals; drummer
- Years active: 1995–present
- Labels: RS Promotion (1995–2007); GMM Grammy (2007–2014)
- Spouse: Natcha Daeng-ngam (m. 2015)

Ruangsak Loychusak (Thai: เรืองศักดิ์ ลอยชูศักดิ์), also known as James Ruangsak, is a Thai actor and singer. His first album was Dai Wela...James ("It's time for James"). He then released Siren Love, Forever James, The Next, James Hits Series, and James F. M.. His bestselling albums include Siren Love and James F. M., and popular singles include: "Khon raek" (Thai: คนแรก; lit.: "First One"), "Khao man kai" (ข้าวมันไก่; "Hainanese chicken rice"), and "Mai aht bplian jai" (ไม่อาจเปลี่ยนใจ; "I Shouldn't Change Your Mind").

== Early life ==
Loychusak was born into a Sino Thai family on 9 March 1978 in Nakhon Si Thammarat, southern Thailand.

== Career ==
He entered the music business in 1995 when he released his first studio album Dai Wela...James with RS Promotion, yielding successful results. He is considered one of the teen stars in Thailand's 1990s music scene, alongside contemporary teen stars such as Patiparn "Moss" Pataweekarn, Sornram "Num" Teppitak, Somchai "Tao" Khemglad, Suttida "Nook" Kasemsan na Ayudhya, Lift&Oil, Raptor, and Tata Young.

He was a taekwondo practitioner, and starred in the February 1997 action film Gangster Boys, directed by Ricky Loo and produced by Five Star Production.

On 11 December 1998, Loychusak survived the crash of Thai Airways International Flight 261. The press therefore nicknamed him "Iron Bones Singer" or "James, The Iron Bones".

He became popular again as Knight Mask (Nah Kak Atsawin) in season two of The Mask Singer.

He once owned a Hainanese chicken rice franchise—a family business originally started by his grandmother in Nakhon Si Thammarat.

== Personal life ==
He married Natcha Daeng-ngam on 24 December 2015 and has one daughter named Andromeda, born on 19 March 2019.

== Discography ==
=== RS Promotion ===
- Dai Wela...James (It's time for James)
- Siren Love
- Forever James
- James F.M.
- James Delivery
- James Hits Series
- James Festival
- James Clinic
- James Alive
- James Zapp Story

=== Various albums ===
- Superteens
- The Next
- The X-Venture
- mission 4 project
- Rs The celebration

=== GMM Grammy ===
- Now James

=== Concert ===
- Dai Wela...James Open the children's playground
- RS. Freshy Jam Concert
- Super Teens Super Concert
- RS. Meeting Concert 1997
- JAMES SIREN CONCERT Operation LOVE SURROUND
- Super Shake concert Siren Love You Zoo A-Ha
- Pepsi The Next Generation Concert
- RS. Meeting Concert 1998
- RS meeting concert 2000
- Mission 4 Project Live Concert for Friend
- RS. The Celebration Concert
- RS. Meeting concert 2001
- James Hanami Mobile Concert
- RS. Meeting Concert Super Surprise Trilogy (2002)
- James Ruangsak Concert Dai Wela...James
- RS. Meeting concert Return 2013
- TOYOTA PRESENTS THE NEXT VENTURE CONCERT 2016
- RS. Meeting Concert 2022
- RS HITS JOURNEY CONCERT 2023
- RS Meeting Concert 2024

== Filmography ==
=== Films ===
- Gangster Boys (The Gang)
- CCJ
- Home
- Jandara 1
- Jandara 2

=== Television ===
- Insee Daeng (superhero series aired on Channel 7 adapted from a namesake film in 60s and 70s starred Mitr Chaibancha)
- Boon Pong (mini series, Boonpong Sirivejjabhandu's biography aired on Thai PBS)
- Susankhonpen (drama, horror series aired on Channel 7)
- Penkhao
- Sri Ayodhaya (special series to glorify the Kings in the Ayutthaya period presented and aired on TrueVisions)
