= Ploypailin Thangprabhaporn =

Thai actress, model, and YouTuber (born 1997)

Ploypailin Tangprabhaporn
- พลอยไพลิน ตั้งประภาพร
- Born: March 4, 1997 (age 29)
- Other name: Ploy
- Occupations: Actress; model; YouTuber
- Years active: 2016–present
- Agents: Channel 7 (2016–2020); Independent (2020–-present)
- Parents: Wichit Tangprabhaporn (father); Sasikan Tangprabhaporn (mother)
- Relatives: Pimprapa Tangprabhaporn (Older Sister)

Ploypailin Thangprabhaporn (Thai: พลอยไพลิน ตั้งประภาพร, 4 March 1997) is a Thai actress, model, and YouTuber. Her nickname is Ploy. She was a younger sister of actress Pimprapa Tangprabhaporn actress.

== Early life ==
Ploypailin was born on 4 March 1997 at Bangkok, Thailand. She was the youngest child of Wichit Tangprabhaporn, Managing Director of Bangkok Komatsu Sales Company Limited, and his wife Sasikan. Ploypailin has two older sisters: Pim (Pimprapa) and Prae.

Ploypailin graduated with a Bachelor's degree with 1st class honors from College of Community Arts Rangsit University and earned the degree certificate in 2019.

In 2016 Ploypailin signed a contract with Channel 7 and was first on screen in Sitcom Hor Hew Khon Hua Look (หอเฮ้วขนหัวลุก) as Pla Thong (ปลาทอง) at age 19.

In 2017 Ploypailin had her first dramatic role on the period drama Massaya (มัสยา) as Reungjai Rattanamahasarn (เริงใจ รัตนมหาศาล), followed by dramas such as Look Long (ลูกหลง), Kluen Pee Paun (คลื่นผีป่วน), and Nak Su Satan Fah (นักสู้สะท้านฟ้า).

In 2020 Ploypailin appeared in her first movie Low Season (สุขสันต์วันโสด) as Lin (หลิน) with Mario Maurer. Ploypailin's contract with Channel 7 expired in July–August 2020.

== Filmography ==
=== TV Drama ===
Years	Title	Roles	Channels
2016	Hor Hew Khon Hua Look (หอเฮ้วขนหัวลุก)	Pla Thong (ปลาทอง)	Channel 7
2017	Massaya (มัสยา)	Ruengjai Rattanamahasarn (เริงใจ รัตนมหาศาล)	Channel 7
2017	Look Long (ลูกหลง)	Marika (มาริกา)	Channel 7
2018	Kluen Pee Puan (คลื่นผีป่วน)	Baicha (ใบชา)	Channel 7
2018	Nak Su Satan Fah	Fai (ฝ้าย)	Channel 7
2018	Mae Sue Pak Rai Poo Chay Rod Jud (แม่สื่อปากร้ายผู้ชายรสจัด)	Ming Ming (หมิง หมิง)	Channel 7
2019	Pleung Saneha (เพลิงเสน่หา)	Ka-na (คะน้า)	Channel 7
	Man Bang Jai (ม่านบังใจ)	Khanda (กานดา)	Channel 7
	Por Mai Lek Tai Song Tua (พ่อหม้ายเลขท้ายสองตัว)	Pan Jai (ปานใจ)	Channel 7
	Rak Lon Pang (รักล้นแผง)		Channel 7
2021	Pad Thai (ผัดไทย สูตรลับลิขิตฝัน)	Sen Chan (เส้นจันท์)	TPBS

=== Movies ===
Years	Name	Role	With
2020	Low Season	Lin	Mario Maurer

== Presenter ==
Years	Product
2016	KFC egg tarts
2019	Samsung Galaxy note 10

== MC ==
- 2021 : On Air YouTube:Pigkaploy (17/11/21)
