= Dut Tawan Dang Phu-pha =

- Also known as: Moral of the Sun
- Genre: Action; Drama; Romance
- Written by: Poompandin
- Directed by: Cherd Pakdeevijit
- Starring: Siwat Chotchaicharin; Nattasha Nauljam; Sammy Cowell
- Opening theme: Doot Tawan Dang Pupah by Gun Pakdeevijit
- Ending theme: Tawan Lae Pupah by Kaewkarn Chuenpennit
- Country of origin: Thailand
- Original language: Thai
- No. of episodes: 13

Production
- Executive producer: Chalong Pakdeevijit
- Producers: Ah Long Jr. Sumon Pakdeevijit; Boonjira Tririya
- Production location: Thailand
- Running time: 120 minutes/episode Mondays and Tuesdays at 20:25 (ICT)
- Production company: Bangkok Audio Vision

Original release
- Network: Channel 7
- Release: November 26, 2012 – January 8, 2013

Related
- Evening News: Second Edition; Praden Det 7 Si

Dut Tawan Dang Phu-pha (Thai: ดุจตะวันดั่งภูผา; lit: As the Sun, As the Mountain; International title: Moral of the Sun) is a Thai TV series or lakorn aired on Thailand's Channel 7 from November 26, 2012, to January 8, 2013, on Mondays and Tuesdays at 20:25 for 13 episodes.

== Plot summary ==
To investigate the death of his father, Tai a young man who is a zookeeper, have been a supporter in the gang of the godfather Boon, and that makes him meet the truth.

== Cast ==
- Siwat Chotchaicharin as Tai
- Nattasha Nauljam as Plai Fah
- Sammy Cowell as Nannapad or Khun Pad
- Sira Rattanapokasatit as Otee
- Chuchai Busala-Khamvong as Boon
- Suphakit Tangthatswasd as Ah Huad
- Poolaphat Attapanyapol as Riao
- Kanyapat Tanunchaikan as Paeng
- Pichayadon Peungphan as Pete
- Nukkid Boonthong as Mungkorn
- Kwankawin Thamrongratset as Lily
- Jarin Promrungsi as Ah Peaw
- Kriangsak Reanchaithong as Na Chat
- Yup Khan as Na Pad
- Charattha Imraporn as Nu Aem
- Wanvisa Srivilai as Betty

== Ratings ==
In the tables below, the blue numbers represent the highest ratings and the red numbers represent the lowest ratings.

Episode	Broadcast Date	AGB Ratings
Episode	Broadcast Date	Nationwide
1	November 26, 2012	12.4%
2	December 3, 2012	10.1%
3	December 4, 2012	10.1%
4	December 10, 2012	11.1%
5	December 11, 2012	11.1%
6	December 17, 2012	11.1%
7	December 18, 2012	10.6%
8	December 24, 2012	10.7%
9	December 25, 2012	10.9%
10	December 31, 2012	7.2%
11	January 1, 2013	8.8%
12	January 7, 2013	12.4%
13	January 8, 2013	14.7%
Average		10.86%
