= Pieretta Dawn =

Thai author (born 1994)

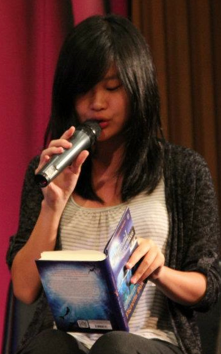
- Dawn in 2011
- Born: 28 January 1994 (age 32); Bangkok, Thailand
- Education: Bangkok Patana School
- Occupation: Writer
- Writing career
- Genres: Fantasy; adventure; young adult; children's literature
- Notable work: The Mermaid Apprentices
- Website: piernirandara.com

Praekarn (Pier) Nirandara (born 28 January 1994), better known by her pen name Pieretta Dawn, is a Thai author who writes in English. She received national acclaim in 2009, when she published her debut, young adult novel, The Mermaid Apprentices, the first of The Interspecies Trilogy, at age 15, through NanmeeBooks. Various writers have praised her work for its creativity and social message, including S.E.A. Write Award winner Binlah Sonkalagiri.

== Biography ==
Dawn was born in Bangkok, Thailand. She attended Bangkok Patana School, during which time, she published her first novel, The Mermaid Apprentices. The book was originally written in English and later translated into Thai. Dawn has cited her experience growing up in a multicultural environment and traveling to over 70 countries as inspiration for writing "a children's fantasy series that tackles themes of identity, prejudice, morality, and social responsibility".

Dawn has spoken at UNESCO symposiums and book events and toured schools to promote reading and writing among Thai students. She has also appeared in radio and television interviews, including on VIP Talk Show, Dek Dee Ded, School Bus, and in newspapers such as Bangkok Post and The Nation. She has been a brand ambassador for the Bangkok Metropolitan's campaign "Bangkok Read for Life", in association with UNESCO. She was awarded the Outstanding Youth Award by the Office of the Educational Council, officially selected by the Bangkok Metropolitan Administration as a delegate to attend the One Young World conference in Dublin, and added to Thailand's Writer's Hall of Fame. In 2014, her short story "Fah" was shortlisted for the S.E.A. Write Award's ASEAN Young Writers Award.

In 2017, Dawn served on the panel of judges for the Neilson Hays Young Writers Award, and published The Elven Ambassador, the final installment to The Interspecies Trilogy. She resides in Los Angeles, where she works in the film industry and runs the travel blog Pier's Great Perhaps.

== Bibliography ==
=== The Interspecies Trilogy ===
1. The Mermaid Apprentices (2009)
2. The Nymph Treasury (2011)
3. The Elven Ambassador (2017)

=== The Interspecies Trilogy graphic novel adaptations ===
1. The Mermaid Apprentices: The Graphic Novel (2012)
2. The Nymph Treasury: The Graphic Novel Part 1 (2013)
3. The Nymph Treasury: The Graphic Novel Part 2 (2014)
4. The Elven Ambassador: The Graphic Novel Part 1 (TBD)
5. The Elven Ambassador: The Graphic Novel Part 2 (TBD)

=== Lani and the White Witch ===
In 2012, Dawn wrote a short story titled "Lani and the White Witch", along with a graphic novel adaptation. The story is a tie-in with a Kasikornbank and Ogilvy & Mather television commercial and was released for free in English and Thai on Kasikornbank's Facebook page. Two other authors also wrote stories for the project, including S.E.A. Write Award winner Ngarmpun Vejjajiva.

=== "Fah" ===
In 2014, Dawn was shortlisted for the S.E.A. Write Award's ASEAN Young Writers Award with her short story "Fah". She has stated on her website that the story "chronicles the journey of a Thai prostitute named 'Fah' (ฟ้า) which simultaneously means "blue" and "sky" in Thai".
