= Michele Waagaard =

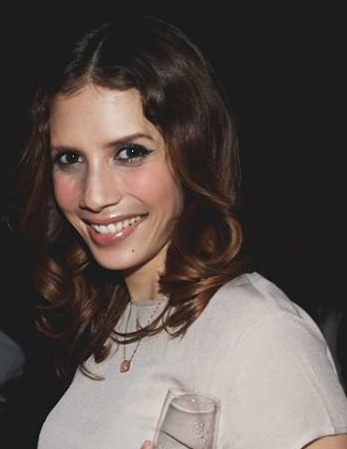

Background information
- Born: Michele Waagaard; 1980 (age 45–46); Hønefoss, Norway
- Genres: Pop, dance
- Occupations: Content Creator, producer, model, VJ, Copywriter, Singer
- Years active: 1999-2021
- Label: Green Beans
- Formerly of: JAMP (1999-2021)

Michele Waagaard (Thai: มิเชล วอกอร์ด; born 1980) is a Norwegian-Thai model, pop singer, television presenter, and former MTV VJ. She gained prominence in Thailand during the 1990s and early 2000s and later worked with the Norwegian national broadcaster NRK.

Waagaard grew up in Hønefoss, moving to Thailand, where her mother is from, in her teens. She studied at Bangkok Patana School and later earned a degree in Communication Arts from Assumption University.

In the mid-1990s, Waagaard signed a recording contract with Grammy Entertainment in Thailand and participated in the teen pop project Teen 8 Grade A.

She later became a member of the Thai pop girl group JAMP (Thai: แจมป์), which released two albums before disbanding in 2001.

In 2002, Waagaard joined MTV Thailand as a video jockey (VJ), hosting music programs including MTV POP and MTV ROCK.

After relocating to Norway, Waagaard worked as a host and producer for the daily music program Svisj Show on NRK.

From 2010 to 2012 Michele moved on to work for a Bangkok local radio station WAVE FM 88, hosting the morning show and weekend show.

Since 2012, Michele retreated from the spotlight and went into corporate where she has been working in the content field. Currently, she is living in Berlin.

== Discography (as member of JAMP) ==
- Jamp! (1999)
- บังอรเอาแต่แดนซ์ (2000)
