= Neko Jump =

Thai pop duo

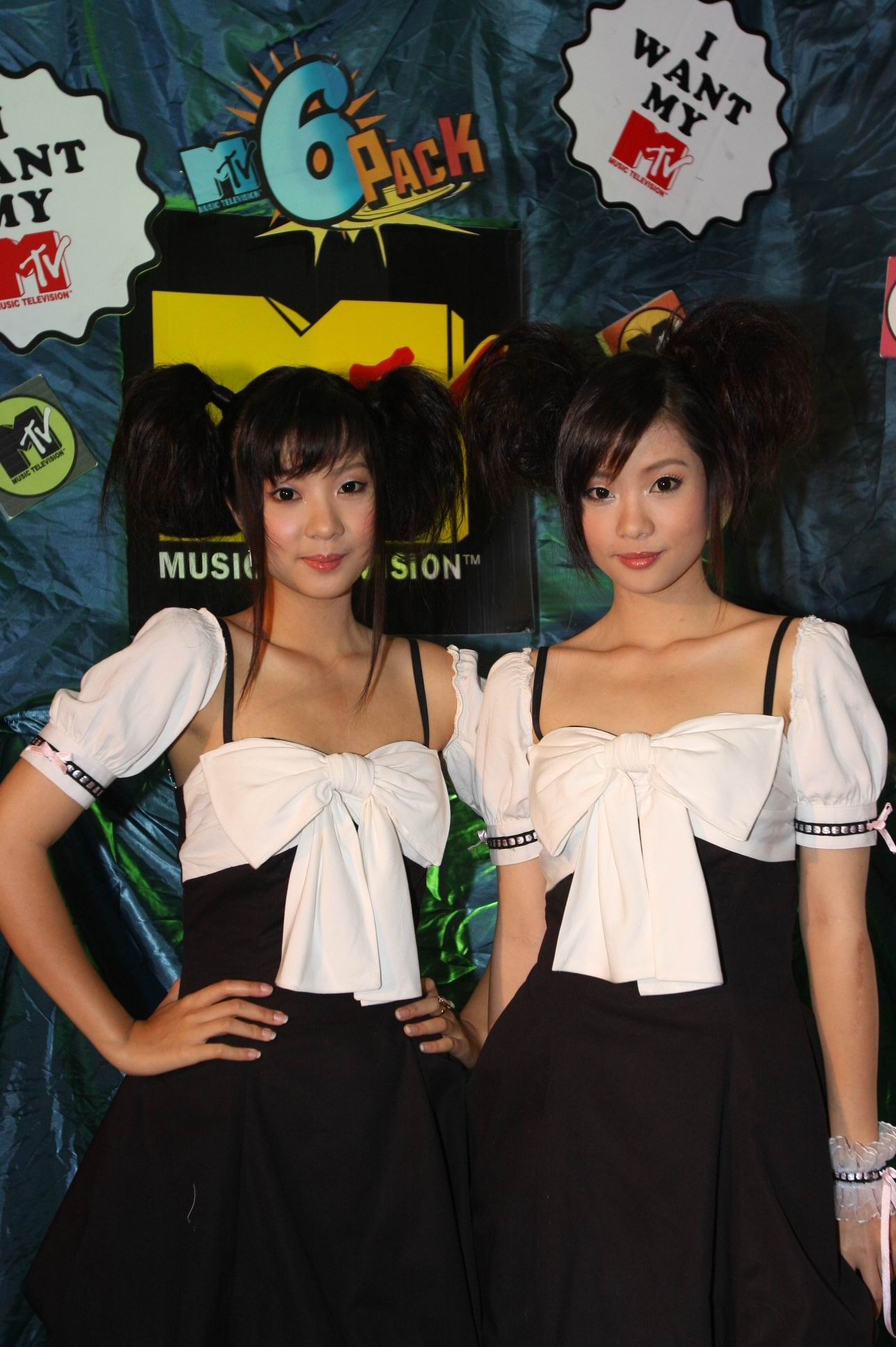

Background information
- Born: December 10, 1989 (age 36)
- Origin: Bangkok, Thailand
- Genres: T-pop; Teen pop J-pop
- Years active: 2006–2017
- Labels: Kamikaze - Thailand, RS Promotion (2006–2017); King Records - Japan
- Past members: Warattha Imraporn (Noey); Charattha Imraporn (Jam)

Neko Jump was a pop duo band in Thailand, composed of twin sisters Warattha "Noey (Thai: เนย)" (Thai: วรัฐฐา) and Charattha "Jam (Thai: แจม)" (Thai: ชรัฐฐา) Imraporn (Thai: อิมราพร).

== History ==
The twins were born on December 10, 1989. Noey is two minutes younger than Jam. Their younger sister is named Piglet, and belongs to the Thai girl group Sugar Eyes. When Noey and Jam were in primary school, they took singing and dancing classes and impressed their teachers. They joined contests and practiced singing and acting.

Some of their songs were distributed in Japan by King Records between 2006 and 2010, with Thai versions included. One song was used as the opening and ending in the anime Anyamaru Tantei Kiruminzuu in the Thai and Japanese version. In 2009, Jam joined the project girl group Seven Days that consisted of female artists, such as Waii, signed under the Kamikaze label. In June 2012, it was announced that the project group would be revived to feature a new line-up including Noey alone instead. The new line-up debuted with the song "Angry Boo".

From 2015 to 2017, the twins did not work together at all, due to contract restrictions. Their contract expired on July 28, 2017, freeing them of its restrictions.

In 2018, the twins made a comeback with their younger sister Piglet and debuted in a sub-unit named JNP with the single Bad Pillow.

== Education ==
Noey and Jam studied for a bachelor's degree at the Faculty of Fine Arts, and then took two years of Communication Arts at Stamford International and University of Oxford.

== Recognition ==
- Noey won first place in a Disney Singing Contest, singing 'Colors of The Wind', while Jam came in second place.
- Jam won first place in the Royal Trophy Singing Contest, singing a song written by the King of Thailand.
- They won first place in the Exit B-Boy and 12-Plus G-Girl Contest 2005 by dancing and singing songs, including 'All That Jazz'.
- Noey and Jam were the last semi-finalists in the KPN Awards singing contest.

== Dramas ==
- Doot Tawan Dang Pupah (2012) – Jam
- Wiwa Paa Cha Taek (2013) – Jam
- Autumn In My Heart (2013) – Jam
- Ching Rak Hak Sawat (2014) – Jam
- ลิขิตฟ้ากั้นรัก (2014) – Jam
- วิมานซาตาน (2014) – Noey
- หัวใจลัดพ่วง (2014) – Noey

Year	Thai title	Title	Role	With	ผลิตโดย	Network	Past members
2012	ดุจตะวันดั่งภูผา	Dut Tawan Dang Phu-pha	หนูเอม; Nu Aem		Bangkok Auidio Vision	Channel 7	Charattha Imraporn (Jam)
2013	วิวาห์ป่าช้าแตก	Wiwa Paa Cha Taek	พิมดาว; Pimdao	Tana Limpayaraya (Chain)	Ban Jong Tam	Channel 8	Charattha Imraporn (Jam)
2013	รักนี้ชั่วนิรันดร์	Autumn In My Heart			True Visions	Channel 8	Charattha Imraporn (Jam)
2014	ชิงรักหักสวาท	Ching Rak Hak Sawat	แม่หญิงบุษบาบรรณ; Butsababan	Sittha Sapanuchart	Dee Kuen Dee Won	Channel 8	Charattha Imraporn (Jam)
2015	สุภาพบุรุษซาตาน	Suphapburut Satan	ปานดาว; Parndao/Dao	Daweerit Chullasapya	Aplus Production	Channel 8	Charattha Imraporn (Jam)
2023	หลงเงา	Mungkorn Lhong Ngao	ฉัตรวรางค์ (ฉัตร); Chatwarang (Chat)	Supasit Chinvinijkul	Splentid Studio; N Channel (Thailand)	PPTV HD 36	Charattha Imraporn (Jam)

== Series ==
Year	Thai title	Title	Role	With	ผลิตโดย	Network	Past members
2018	เสน่หา สตอรี่		ฟาริ Fari		TV Thunder	AIS PLAY	Charattha Imraporn (Jam)
2020	อาทิตย์อัสดง	After Dark The Series				WeTV	Warattha Imraporn (Noey); Charattha Imraporn (Jam)

== Sitcoms ==
Year	Thai title	Title	Role	With	ผลิตโดย	Network	Past members
2018	ระเบิดเถิดเทิงซอยข้าใครอย่าแตะ		พะแนง; Panaeng (Guest Star)		Workpoint Entertainment	Workpoint TV	Warattha Imraporn (Noey)
2018	เป็นต่อ	Pen Tor	มุก; Muk (Guest Star)		The ONE Enterprise Public	One 31	Charattha Imraporn (Jam)

== Movies ==
- Saranae-Osekai (2012) - Both

== Albums ==
- 2006: Neko Jump
  1. Poo
  2. Sarang hae yoe (chun ruk ter)
  3. My gallery
  4. Chuay mud nhoi
  5. khao jah ngao mhai
- 2007: Joob Joob
  1. Joob joob
  2. Puen nah jor
  3. E des kah
  4. Khao jah pai jeeb krai eak mhai
  5. Khern khern
- 2008: Lady Ready!
  1. Oak huk kaa
  2. Kawaii Boy
  3. Chi mi
  4. Yark took ter kid tueng
  5. Yah yood na
  6. Happy Hurtday
  7. Luer
  8. Wun haeng kwam ruk
  9. Nai tua rai ka yai jai noi
  10. Nueng kum tee geb wai
- 2010: Secret of Virgin
  1. Harm Naun Khon Diew
  2. Mi khey thuk rak ley
  3. Message
  4. Ruk Mi Me Chao Khong
  5. Kair Tur Bung Kub
  6. Kair Ngao Ya Cao Chi Pid
  7. Ruk Kor Di
  8. Pueng Ruk Tur
- 2012: Ahhh!
  1. Mai Tod Chi (Girls On Top)
  2. Mai Ruk Chum Dai
  3. Na Ta Dee Mai Mee Fan
