= Four–Mod =

Thai pop duo

Four-Mod
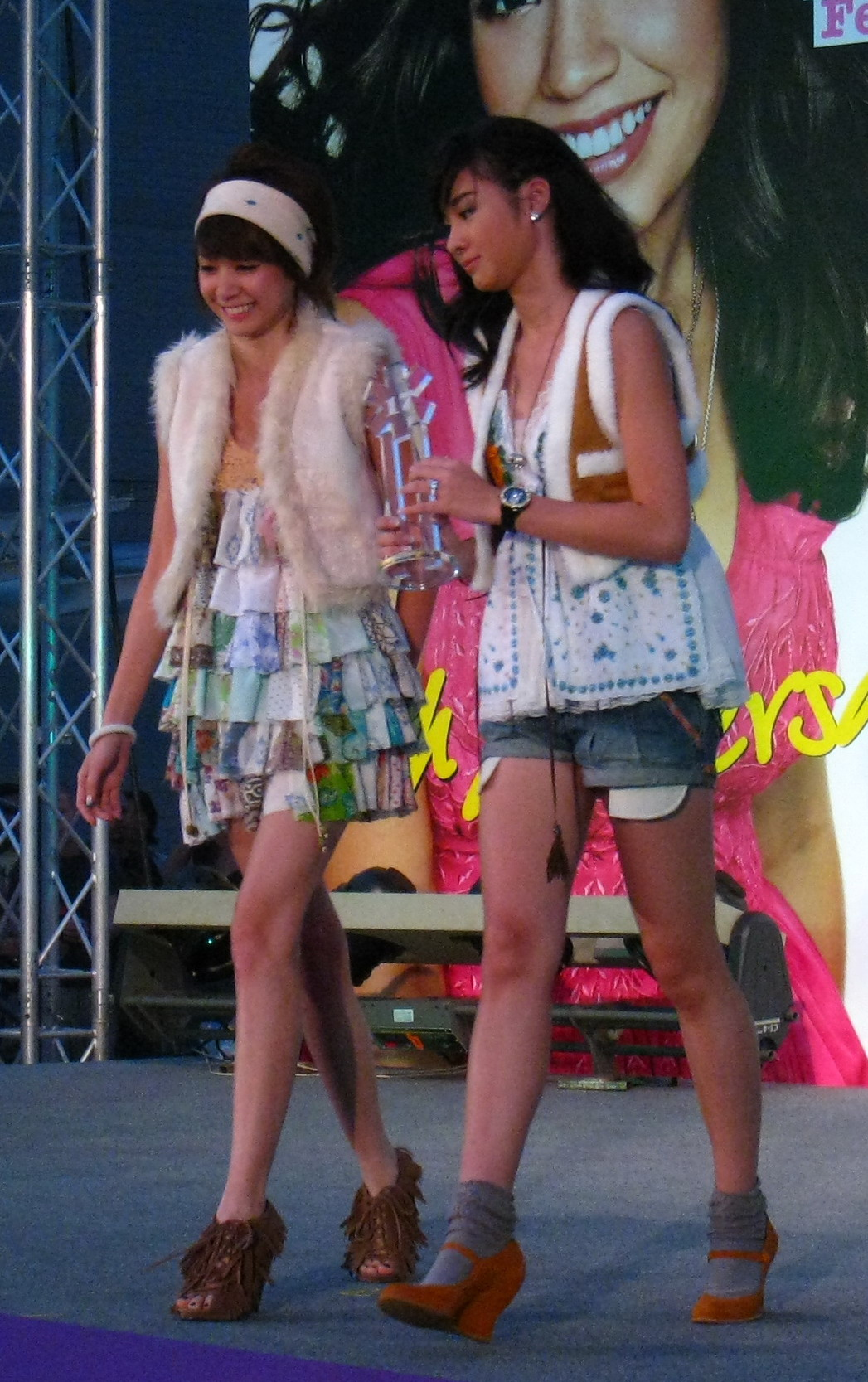
- Four-Mod at the 6th anniversary of Seventeen magazine concert

Background information
- Origin: Bangkok, Thailand
- Genres: Pop
- Years active: 2005–2015
- Labels: Kamikaze; RS Promotion
- Past members: Sakolrat Woraurai (Four); Napapat Wattanakamolwut (Mod)

Four–Mod (โฟร์-มด) was a Thai pop duo which formed in 2005. Their debut single was "Hai Jai Pen Tur".

== Members ==
- "Four" (Sakolrat Woraurai) (ศกลรัตน์ วรอุไร) graduated with a bachelor's degree from Ramkhamhaeng.
- "Mod" (Napapat Wattanakamolwut) (ณปภัช วัฒนากมลวุฒิ) graduated from Bangkok University.

== Discography ==
=== Albums ===
- (2005) Four–Mod
- (2006) Love Love
- (2007) Wooo!
- (2008) In Wonderland
- (2008) Go! Go!
- (2009) We Will Love U
- (2010) Hello Four–Mod
- (2012) I AM FOUR MOD
- (2013) CLUB FM
