= Bangkok Patana School =

Private international school in Bangkok, Thailand

- โรงเรียนบางกอกพัฒนา
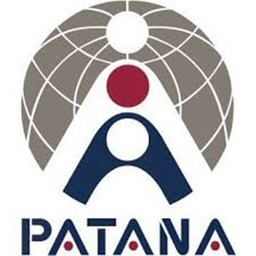

Location
- Bangkok; Thailand; 13°39′47″N 100°37′19″E

Information
- Type: Private British International School
- Motto: Fulfilling Potential
- Established: 1957; 69 years ago
- Founder: Rosamund Stuetzel
- Head of school: Chris Sammons
- Enrollment: 2250
- Colours: Patana Montrachet Red, Patana Blue and Patana Grey. Black and orange for sports
- Mascot: Tiger (Tiger for whole school)
- Accreditation: Council of International Schools
- Website: www.patana.ac.th

Bangkok Patana School (Thai: โรงเรียนบางกอกพัฒนา, RTGS: Rong Rian Bangkok Phatthana) is a British International School located in Bang Na District, Bangkok, Thailand. Bangkok Patana School was founded in 1957 to provide a British-style education for the children of English-speaking expatriates and others living in Bangkok.

It is Thailand's oldest British international school. As of 2010, it is also the largest British school in the country.

== 70th Anniversary ==
In 2026, Bangkok Patana School marked its 70th anniversary. The anniversary commemorated the school's establishment in 1957 by founder Rosamund Stuetzel. As part of the anniversary celebrations, the school introduced a dedicated 70th-anniversary logo.

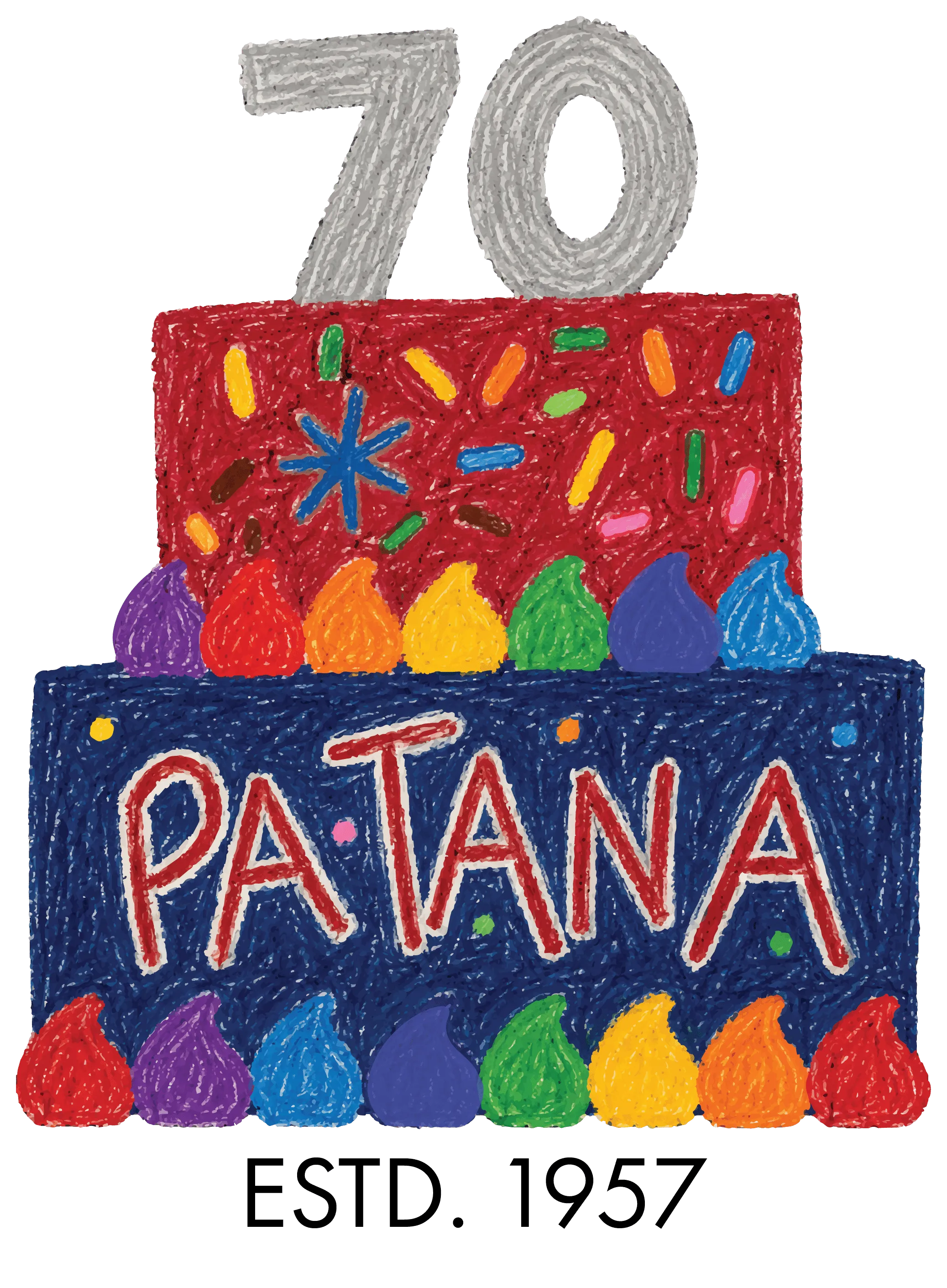
Patana's 70'th Anniversary Logo

You can view the Patana's 70th Anniversary logo on the right.

== Curriculum ==
Students range from 18 months to 18 years of age and follow the English National Curriculum until they sit IGCSE examinations at 16. Senior students take the International Baccalaureate Diploma or Certificate in Years 12 and 13. They also have all years ranging from nursery to Year 13, perfect for people who don't want to switch schools.

== Student body ==
As of 2017, 24% of the students are from British families and this is the largest group of students by nationality. The school is international with the student body representing 60 - 65 nationalities.

== Facilities ==
The 48-acre campus, situated in Bangna, includes purpose-built classrooms, secondary and primary libraries, three swimming pools, an indoor sports centre, tennis courts and sports fields. The school is also home to an Arts Centre, Science Centre, and a Theatre that offers facilities for students, teachers and the community.

== Accreditation ==
Bangkok Patana School is accredited by the Council of International Schools (CIS), and is an IB World School.

== Sports ==
The sports teams in the school compete under the name and mascot of tigers. Each sports teams use variations of the Tiger name, such as the tiger sharks for the swim team. The teams compete in tournaments such as BISAC, SEASAC and FOBISIA even at the Varsity level in sports like basketball, football, volleyball, softball, swimming, badminton and athletics. Bangkok Patana School opened their new sports hall in 2007 (to commemorate their 50th anniversary), which was opened by the Princess of Thailand. Bangkok Patana School along with other schools from around South-East Asia compete in the FOBISIA tournament every year. They have a range of, U9, U11, U13, U15, Junior Varsity and Varsity.

== Environment ==
Bangkok Patana School is a silver certified green school. The School currently supplies some of its energy from solar. The School aims to enable well rounded Eco-Friendly Students.

== Notable alumni ==
- Joni Anwar – singer and actor
- Nandhavud Bhirombhakdi – racing driver
- Ananda Everingham – actor
- Krissa M. Lanham – judge of the US District Court for the District of Arizona
- Praekarn Nirandara (Pieretta Dawn) – author
- Alex Rendell – actor, singer
- Louis Scott – actor, singer, TV host, racer
- Urassaya Sperbund – actress, model
- Somtow Sucharitkul – Composer, conductor and author of "Vampire Junction"
- Erika Tham – actress
- Michele Waagaard – model, JAMP singer and VJ for MTV Thailand
- Tata Young – singer, actress and model
- Siranudh Scott – marine conservationist and activist
