= Lift & Oil =

Thai musical duo

Lift&Oil
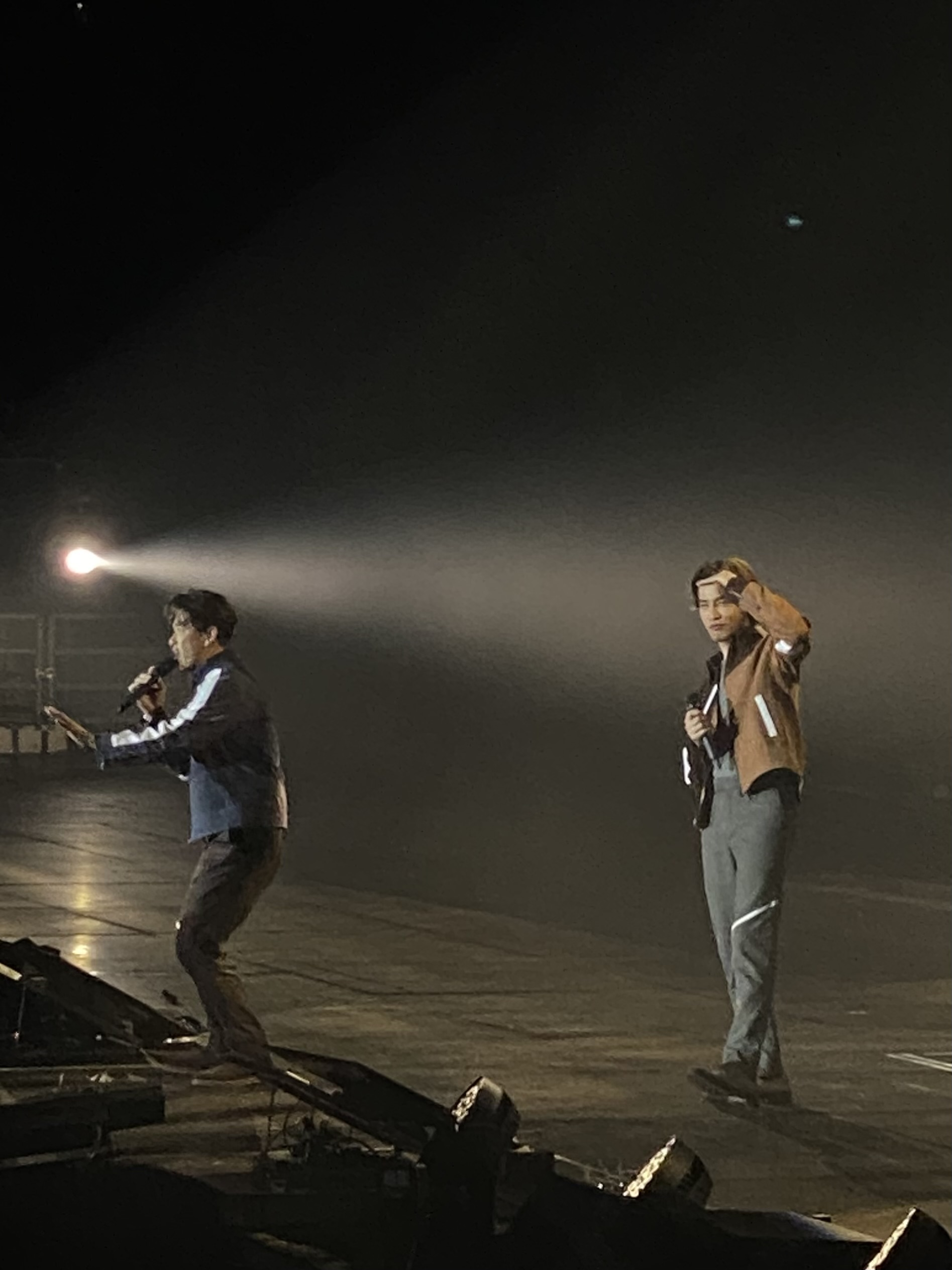
- Lift-Oil (ลิฟท์-ออย) GRAMMY X RS 90's Versary Concert

Background information
- Origin: Bangkok, Thailand
- Genres: Pop; Dance-pop
- Years active: 1994–2003; 2011–present
- Labels: RS Promotion; (1994–2003)
- Past members: Supoj "Lift" Chanjareon; Thana "Oil" Suttikamol

Lift & Oil was a Thai duo famous and popular in the 1990s under RS Promotion. The duo consists of Supoj "Lift" Chanjareon and Thana "Oil" Suttikamol. Their albums Lift & Oil and ZOO-A-HA each sold over a million copies.

== History ==
They started as popular models in teenager magazines during the same period as Boyscout, Sornram Teppitak, Somchai Khemglad, etc.

Lift's original nickname is Dong. He is from Lamphun while Oil is from Ratchaburi and Nakhonratchasima. They had challenge from RS Label to make the relationship work.

Their next time, they decided to rent the apartment in BKK. This apartment had 10 people living in it, 1 being as James-Ruangsak Loychusak.

They debuted in 1994 in the name Lift&Oil first time in RS Meeting Concert 1994 Book Kaow Olaveng Rongpleang Nabann (Th:บุกเกาะอลเวงร้องเพลงหน้าบาน) and they made a chart in album Lift&Oil and ZOO-A-HA break out with sales exceeded a million caches.

As they had a specific fashion choice, on their first album, Lift&Oil, they wore matching short T-shirts. Later, for the ZOO-A-HA project, they wore T-shirts with vibrant colors. Besides that, they had long hair from 1991–1996.

Until Oil 1 member had been draft in 1998 Lift&Oil had been stop. They returned in 2001 album Play Boys but unsuccessed as same as first two albums. In 2003 they had last album Der-Taa-2 and break up the duo band.

They reunited in 2011 with Raptor, as guests for Raptor's concert. In 2012 they had their big concert Lift&Oil Happy Party concert and have had concerts until the present.

== Members ==
Lift & Oil

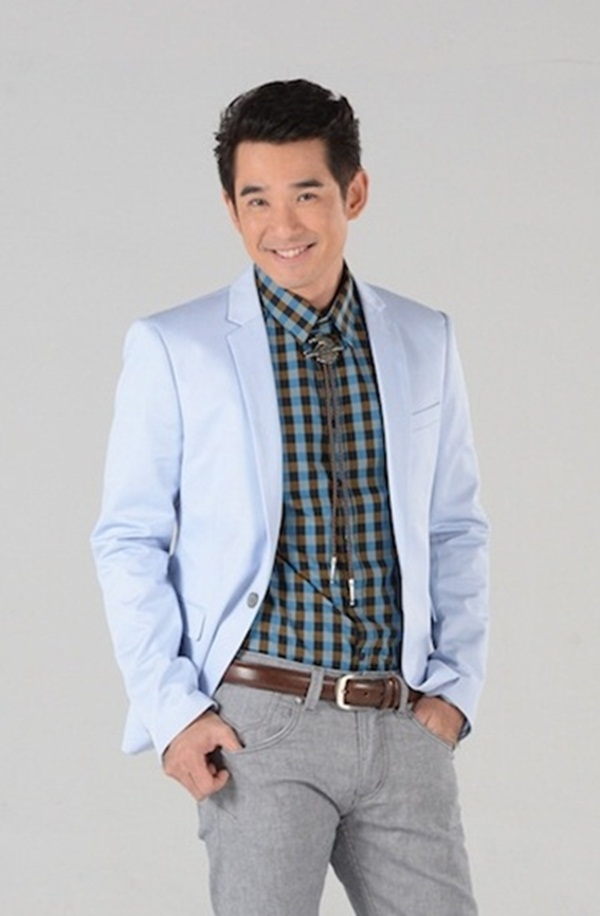
Lift Supoj

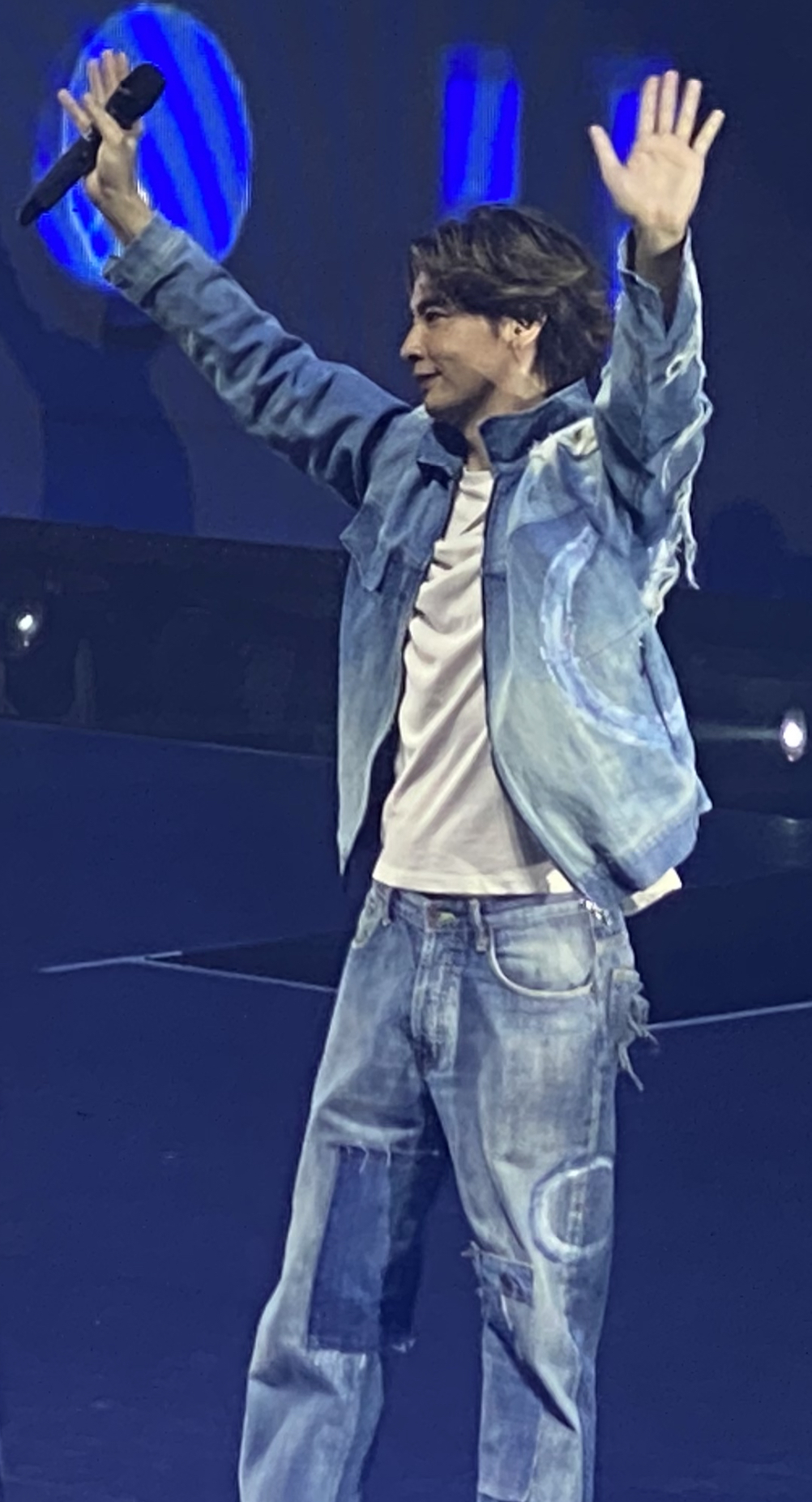
Oil Thana

- Lift-Supoj Chanjareon (ลิฟท์ : สุพจน์ จันทร์เจริญ)
- Oil–Thana Suttikamol (ออย : ธนา สุทธิกมล)

== Discography ==
=== Studio albums ===
- Lift&Oil (ลิฟท์กับออย) 1994
- Lift&Oil Sanam Dek Ten (Lift&Oil Dance Ground) (ลิฟท์กับออย สนามเด็กเต้น) 1995
- ZOO-A-HA 1997
- Play Boys 2001
- Der-Taa-2 2003

=== Compilation albums ===
- superteens 1996
- The Next 1997
- Lift&Oil Earthquakes 1997
- Lift&Oil Funtasy 1998
- The Celebration 2001
- Ost.Can Lum Khong (แคนลำโขง) 2005

=== Concert ===
- Rom Bor Join Oil & Lift (TH:รมณ์บ่จอย ออยกับลิฟท์) (24 Dec 1994) MBK Hall
- Lift & Oil Bumpping Concert (28 Jan 1995) MBK Hall
- Lift & Oil Concert Pert Sanam Dek Ten (TH:เปิดสนามเด็กเต้น) (29 July 1995) Fashion Island
- Zoo A-Ha Zoo Zaa Concert (31 May 1997) MBK Hall
- Zoo A-Ha Double Zaa Thank you concert (30 Aug 1997) MCC Hall
- Lift&Oil Happy Party concert (14 July 2012) Impact Arena

Jam Concert

- RS. Meeting Concert Book Kaow Olaveng Rongpleang Nabann (Th:บุกเกาะอลเวงร้องเพลงหน้าบาน) (22 Oct 1994) MBK Hall
- RS. Meeting Concert Nok Krueng Bab Zaa (TH:นอกเครื่องแบบ...ซ่า) (7 Oct 1995) MBK Hall
- RS. Freshy Jam Concert (11 Sep 1995) Thai Army Sports Stadium
- Super Teen Super Concert (17 Feb 1996) Hua Mark Indoor Stadium
- RS. Meeting Concert Tam Ra Beab Ten (TH:ตามระเบียบ...เต้น) (2 Feb 1997) MBK Hall
- Pepsi The Next Generation Concert (18 Jan 1998) MBK Hall
- The Celebration Concert (10 Feb 2001) Hua Mark Indoor Stadium
- RS. Meeting Concert Star Mission Mun Lood Lok (TH:มันหลุดโลก) (22 Dec 2001) Hua Mark Indoor Stadium
- RS. Meeting Concert Super Surprise Trilogy (26 Apr 2003) Impact Arena
- RS. Meeting Concert Return 2013 (18-19 May 2013) Impact Arena
- The Next Venture Concert 2016 ( 6 Mar 2016) Impact Arena
- RS. Meeting Concert Dance Marathon (TH: ปลายปี...ถึงทีเต้น) (17 December 2022) Impact Arena
- RS HITS JOURNEY CONCERT 2023 (TH: ต้นปี..ถึงทีฮิต) (27 May 2023) Impact Arena

== Filmography ==
- A Miracle of Oam+Somwung (ปาฏิหาริย์โอม+สมหวัง) 1998

=== Series ===
- Soo Fun Tabun Kang (สู่ฝันตะบันแข้ง) 2002
- Can Lum Khong (แคนลำโขง) 2005
- Din Nhur Thong (ดินเนื้อทอง) 2008
- Keaw Klang Dong (แก้วกลางดง) 2012
- Tewada Fun Namnom (เทวดาฟันน้ำนม) 2015
- Jha Rueng Sueng Yub (จ่าเริงเซิ้งยับ) 2016-2017

=== TV show ===
- Hong Rub Khak Rom Bor Join
