= Faye Fang Kaew =

Thai pop trio girl group

FFK (Faye Fang Kaew)
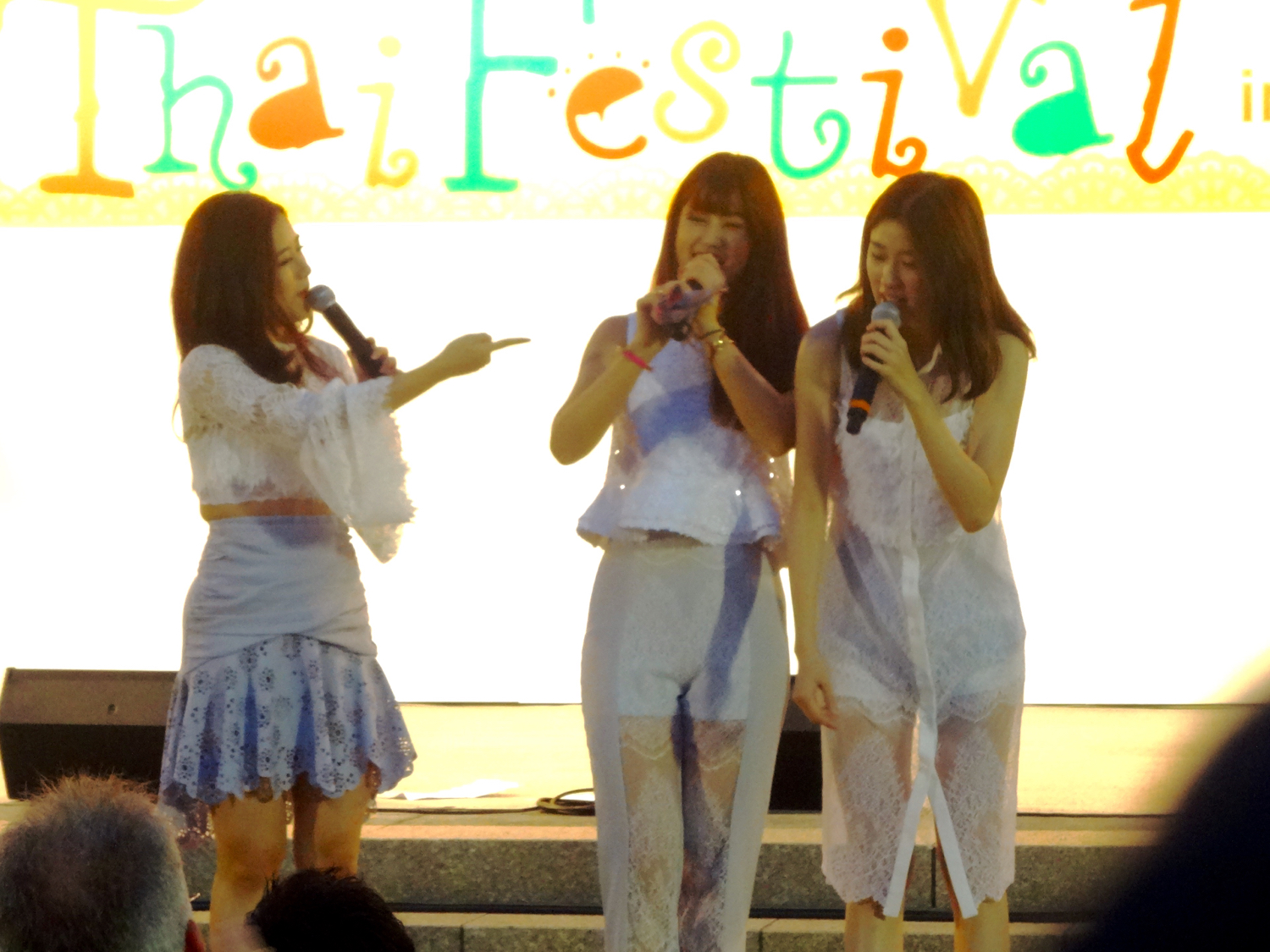
- Faye Fang Kaew in 2015

Background information
- Origin: Bangkok, Thailand
- Genres: Pop
- Years active: 2007–current
- Labels: Kamikaze (RS Promotion) (2007–2015); Yes!Music (2015–2016)
- Members: Dhanundhorn Neerasingh (Fang); Pornpawee Neerasingh (Faye); Jarinya Sirimongkolsakul (Kaew)

FFK (เฟย์ ฟาง แก้ว) is a Thai pop trio girl group consisting of 3 members; Faye, Fang and Kaew, formed in 2007, affiliated with Kamikaze music, a sublabel of RS Music Company. They are the first artists of this teenager-hit music label, representing 3 styles of girls in this generation: fashionista, sweet and cool, different but perfect

FFK released many hit string songs that have topped the Thai radio & music video charts, groups or idols of they're age. In addition to their music career, they have other roles such as being emcees on TV Programs: Kamikaze Club, FFK OPEN WORLD and Lady First, as well as acting in Thai dramas, movies and musical play. They frequently participate in special projects like Kamikaze music, Faye in Seven Days and Fang&Kaew in Love Project.

From their song, Baby Boy, the lyrics "Baby Boy, I'm not your toy" inspired FFK to name their official fanclub "TOY". Their fans chose to name themselves as FFK's "TOY" with it holding a second meaning of being missed (Thinking of You).

In 2015, FFK has graduated from Kamikaze Music to Yes! Music, another sublabel of RS music company.

And in 2019, FFK have a comeback song "Love Track" (เพลงพาไป) as independent artists.

== Members ==
- Pornpawee "Faye" Neerasingh (พรปวีณ์ นีระสิงห์)
- Dhanundhorn "Fang" Neerasingh (ธนันต์ธรญ์ นีระสิงห์)
- Jarinya "Kaew" Sirimongkolsakul (จริญญา ศิริมงคลสกุล)

== Filmography ==
Year	Member	Title	Type	Role	Description
2009	Fang	Daddy Duo (Khun Pau Jorm Fiew) คุณพ่อจอมเฟี้ยว	Drama	Bet (เป็ด)	Play with Bank Black Vanilla
2010	Kaew	Happiness maker company (Bor Ri Sud Sarng Sook) บริษัทสร้างสุข	Drama	Ka-pom (กะปอม)	Guest Star; Episode 17
2010	Faye	Happiness maker company (Bor Ri Sud Sarng Sook) บริษัทสร้างสุข	Drama	Fah (ฟ้า)	Guest Star; Episode 21
2011	Kaew	Superstar's Love Story (Bun Tuek Ruk Superstar) บันทึกรักซุปเปอร์สตาร์	Drama	Palm (ปาล์ม)	Play with Film Ratthaphum
2011	Kaew	Bangkok KungFu บางกอกกังฟู	Film	Kor-ya (กอหญ้า)	Play with Tomo K-OTIC
2011	Fang	Love Therapy (Bum Bud Ruk Bum Roong Sook) บำบัดรักบำรุงสุข	Drama	Kaew (แก้ว)	Play with Bank Black Vanilla
2012	Kaew	Kaew Klang Dong แก้วกลางดง	Drama	Meowadee (เมียวดี)	Play with Oil Thana
2014	Kaew	Sarb Sarng สาปสาง	Drama	Priew (พริ้ว)	Play with Fluke C-Quint
2015	Fang	Love Is (See Sao) สี่เส้า	Film	Ar-Qing (อาฉิง)	Play with Toey Pongsakorn
2015	Kaew	Plerng Pai เพลิงพ่าย	Drama	Ailada (ไอลดา)	Play with Fluke C-Quint
2015	Fang	Dok Sorn Choo ดอกซ่อนชู้	Drama	ML Rudsamhidara (หม่อมหลวงรัศมีดารา)	-
2015	Faye	Love Organic (Phan Ruk Cha Bub Organic) แผนรักฉบับออร์แกนิค	Drama	Salita (สลิตา)	Play with Yong Armchair
2015	Fang	The Sound of Music (Mon Ruk Pleng Sa Whun) มนตร์รักเพลงสวรรค์	Musical	Maria (มาเรีย)	Play with Chai Chattayodom
2015	Kaew	Lhuang Pee Digital หลวงพี่ดิจิตอล	Drama	Mhei (เหมย)	Play with Auan Rangsit
2018	Kaew	Club Friday The Series 9 Episodes Rak Nok Way La Club Friday the Series 9 รักครั้งหนึ่ง ที่ไม่ถึงตาย ตอน รักนอกเวลา	Series	Fai (ฝ้าย)	Play with Nat Thephussadin Na Ayutthaya
2018	Kaew	Naew Sudtai แนวสุดท้าย	Drama	Karnda (กานดา)	Play with Toni Rakkaen
2018	Kaew	Rup Thong รูปทอง	Drama	Year (เยีย)	Play with Dan Worrawech Danuwong
2018	Kaew	Rak Chan Sawan Jat Hai รักฉันสวรรค์จัดให้	Drama	Manatvee (มนัสวี)	Play with Nike Nitidon Pomsuwan
2018	Kaew	Pak ปาก	Drama	Mayrai (เมรัย)	Play with Toomtam Yuthana Puengklarng
2019	Fang	2 Brothers 2 Brothers แผนลวงรักฉบับพี่ชาย	Series	Kaopun (ข้าวปั้น)	Play with Tao Sattaphong Phiangphor
2019	Fang	Wolf Wolf เกมล่าเธอ	Series	Jub-An (จุ๊บอัน)	Guest role
2019	Kaew	Rong Tao Naree รองเท้านารี	Drama	Ticha (ทิชา)	Play with Hunz Isariy Patharamanop
2019	Fang	Plai Chawak ปลายจวัก	Drama	On (อ่อน)	Play with Tao Sattaphong Phiangphor
2020	Kaew	Nang Sao 18 Mongkut นางสาว 18 มงกุฏ	Drama	Nam (น้ำ)	Play with Toni Rakkaen
2020	Fang	My Groom's Secret (Ruk Rak Khong Chun Kub Kadee Phi Luek Phi Lun Khong Jao Bao) รักแรกของฉันกับคดีพิลึกพิลั่นของเจ้าบ่าว	Drama	Cher-Aim (เฌอเอม)	Play with Nat Thewphaingam
2020	Kaew	Fai Gam Prae ฝ้ายแกมแพร	Drama	Jarawee (Ja) (จารวี (วี))	Play with New Chaiyapol Pupart
2021	Kaew	เธอกับฉัน My Sassy Girl	Drama		Play with Nutthasit Kotimanuswanich
2021	Fang	Me Always You รักวุ่นวาย ยัยตัวป่วน	Series	Ploypailin (พลอยไพลิน)	Play with Arak Amornsupasiri

== Discography ==
=== Albums ===
- (2007) FFK

Tracks

1. Na Krab Na Krab นะครับ นะคร๊าบ
2. MSN(^_^)
3. Yung Pen Dok Mai Kong Ter Yu Rur Plao (Flower?) ยังเป็นดอกไม้ของเธออยู่หรือเปล่า
4. Kor Bok Pai Laew Nee Na (Say What You mean) ก็บอกไปแล้วนี่นา
5. Klang Ngon Tha Ruk Kan Yorm Charn Na Tur แกล้งงอน ถ้ารักกัน ยอมฉันนะเธอ
6. Yaak Pen Kae Nong Sao (Younger Sister) อยากเป็นแค่น้องสาว
- (2008) Miz U 2

Tracks

1. Miz Call Miz U
2. Kum Tham (My Question) คำถาม
3. Phom Ruk Khun (I Luv U) ผมรักคุณ
4. Dai Tung Nun (Everything for you) ได้ทั้งนั้น
5. Dek Deur (Your Stubborn Love) เด็กดื้อ
- (2009) POPparazzi

Tracks

1. Help Me Please
2. Ya Hai Kwam Wang (Love Fool) อย่าให้ความหวัง
3. Fan Kon Neung (Your Girl) แฟนคนนึง
4. Kwan Ruk (Love) ความรัก
5. Keun Yhoo Tee Ter (Up 2 U) ขึ้นอยู่ที่เธอ
6. Yhom Pen Puen Ter (Friend Or Nothing) ยอมเป็นเพื่อนเธอ
7. Wang Plao (R U Busy) ว่างป่าว
8. Kao Rur (Rumor) ข่าวลือ
9. Top Friend
10. Khob Khun Tee Hai Chun Dai Ruk Ter (Thanks 4 U) ขอบคุณที่ให้ฉันได้รักเธอ
- (2010) Ladies & Gentlemen

Tracks

1. Baby Boy
2. Mai Chai Id Cha (Jealous) ไม่ใช่อิจฉา
3. Yaak Luem Wa Pen Puen Ter (Blank) อยากลืมว่าเป็นเพื่อนเธอ
4. Kid Sun (Deeper) คิดสั้น
5. Lhong Thang (Blinded) หลงทาง
6. Chun Kleid Ter (Hate U) ฉันเกลียดเธอ
7. Mai Kid Tae Ru Seik (Maybe) ไม่คิดแต่รู้สึก
8. Dee Kwa Na (Boy Friend) ดีกว่านะ
9. Sun Ya (Promise) สัญญา
10. Mai Chai Id Cha ไม่ใช่อิจฉา (Acoustic Version)
- (2012) FFKAHOLIC

Tracks

1. Loveaholic เลิฟอะฮอลิก
2. Tam Mai Kid (Silly Question) ถามไม่คิด
3. Lerk Kun Na (Enough) เลิกกันนะ
- (2013) FFK Girl's Topic

Tracks

1. Mouth to Mouth เม้าท์ทูเม้าท์
2. Mee Sith Jeb Theung Mue Rai (In The End) มีสิทธิ์เจ็บถึงเมื่อไหร่
3. Ying (Peacock) หยิ่ง
- (2015)

Track

1. Ruk Yar Bohn (Primetime) รักอย่าบ่น

=== Seven Days ===
- (2009) Seven Days
1. Ruk Plae Wha Ruk Rue Ploa รักแปลว่ารักหรือเปล่า (Faye)

=== Original soundtrack ===
- (2011) Bangkok Kung Fu
1. War Whun ว้าวุ่น (Kaew)
2. Khor Kuen ขอคืน (Kaew)
- (2014) TV Show : Kami Tid Mun
1. Fhuek Kub Phi Dai Mhai ฝึกกับพี่ได้ไหม (FFK feat. Poppy K-OTIC)

=== Ost. ===
- Dramas : Daddy Duo Khun Por Jom Fiew (คุณพ่อจอมเฟี้ยว)
  - Songs : Faen Khon Nueng Your Girl (Feat. Tomo K-otic) (แฟนคนนึง (Your Girl) (Feat. Tomo K-OTIC))
- Dramas : 2 Brothers (2 Brothers แผนลวงรักฉบับพี่ชาย)
  - Songs : Rak Chan Maikhwam Wa Tur (รักฉันหมายความว่าเธอ) (Fang)
  - Songs : Lomhaichai Khu Tur (ลมหายใจคือเธอ) (Fang)
- Dramas : Kao Waan Hai Noo Pen Sai Lub 2019 (เขาวานให้หนูเป็นสายลับ)
  - Songs : (อะไรก็ลงที่ฉัน) (Kaew)
- Dramas : Why R U? (เพราะรักใช่เปล่า)
  - Songs : (นี่คือรักใช่ไหม ( WHY R U ? ) - แก้ว x โทโมะ) (Kaew)
- Dramas : Nang Sao 18 Mongkut (นางสาว 18 มงกุฎ)
  - Songs : Chur Dai Mai? X KACHA (เชื่อได้มั้ย?)
- Dramas : ()
  - Songs : ()
- Dramas : ()
  - Songs : ()

=== Kamikaze ===
- (2007) Kud Jai ขัดใจ (Kamikaze Debut Song)
- (2008) Forward
- (2008) Pleng Ruk เพลงรัก
- (2008) Peuan Gun Chun Ruk Tur เพื่อนกันฉันรักเธอ
- (2010) Kamikaze Wave (with 2nd Generation of Kamikaze)
- (2011) Ruk Tur Tuk Wi Na Tee รักเธอ ทุกวินาที (Every Minute)
- (2011) Shi Ter ใช่เธอ (It's You) [Poppy K-OTIC + Fang FFK]
- (2011) Pern Tee Ter Mai Roo Jai เพื่อนที่เธอไม่รู้ใจ (Like a Maze) [Tome K-OTIC + Kaew FFK]
- (2011) Ruk Sam Rao รักสามเรา (Trilogy) [Gavin 3.2.1. + WAii + KnomJean]
- (2012) Ruk Tae Cha Tam Ha Ter รักแท้จะตามหาเธอ (Destiny)
- (2014) Ruk Gun Yar Bung Kub รักกันอย่าบังคับ (Dictator)
- (2014) 7 Pee Thi Ruk Thur 7ปีที่รักเธอ

=== Concerts ===
- (2009) Kamikaze Girl Live in Bangkok
- (2009) 1-2-Call Freedom Zheza Zim Presents Kamikaze Live Concert
- (2009) PONDS Presents มันส์..น่านัก (Muns Nar Nuk) Concert
- (2009) Big Max RS @ Smallroom The Music คั่น Concert
- (2010) Kamikaze Wave Concert 2010
- (2010) The Idol Battle Concert (Guest-Kaew)
- (2010) The Seed Show : วัน Boys Show (Guest)
- (2010) Faye Fang Kaew Ladies & Gentlemen Debutante Concert
- (2011) Toa Kae Noi Presents K-OTIC The Real Time Concert (Guest)
- (2011) Hiruscar Postacne Presents KamiKaze LOVEเว่อร์ Concert
- (2011) The 3rd Big Mountain Music Festival
- (2012) Biscuit Gap Presents FFKAHOLIC Concert
- (2012) AIS 1-2-Call Presents Kamikaze the 5th Destiny Concert
- (2013) AIS 3G 1-2-Call Presents Kamikaze K Fight Concert
- (2014) AIS 3G 1-2-Call Presents Kamikaze แดนซ์เนรมิต (Dance Neramit) Concert

=== TV Programmes ===
- (2009-2012) Kamikaze Club : FFK
- (2011) Daddy's meals (Kub Khoa Khong Pau) : Faye, Fang
- (2011-2012) FFK Open World : FFK
- (2013) Lady First : FFK

== Awards ==
- (2009) POP Music Award : Top Download (KAMIKAZE - Puean Gun Chun Ruk Tur)
- (2009) Channel [V] Awards : Best Group
- (2009) Vergin GreetZ Awards : GreetZ Korea (Thai artist that looks "Korea" but is loved by Thai ppl)
- (2009) Audition Music Awards : Best New Artist (Seven Days)
- (2011) Mthai Top Talk-About 2011 : Mthai Top Talk-About Artists
- (2011) Kazz Awards : Popular Group
- (2011) Kazz Awards : Best Concert
- (2012) Playpark Music Awards : Hittest Song (Loveaholic)
- (2012) Seventeen Choice Awards : Seventeen Choice Music Group Artist
