= K-Otic =

Thai pop boy band

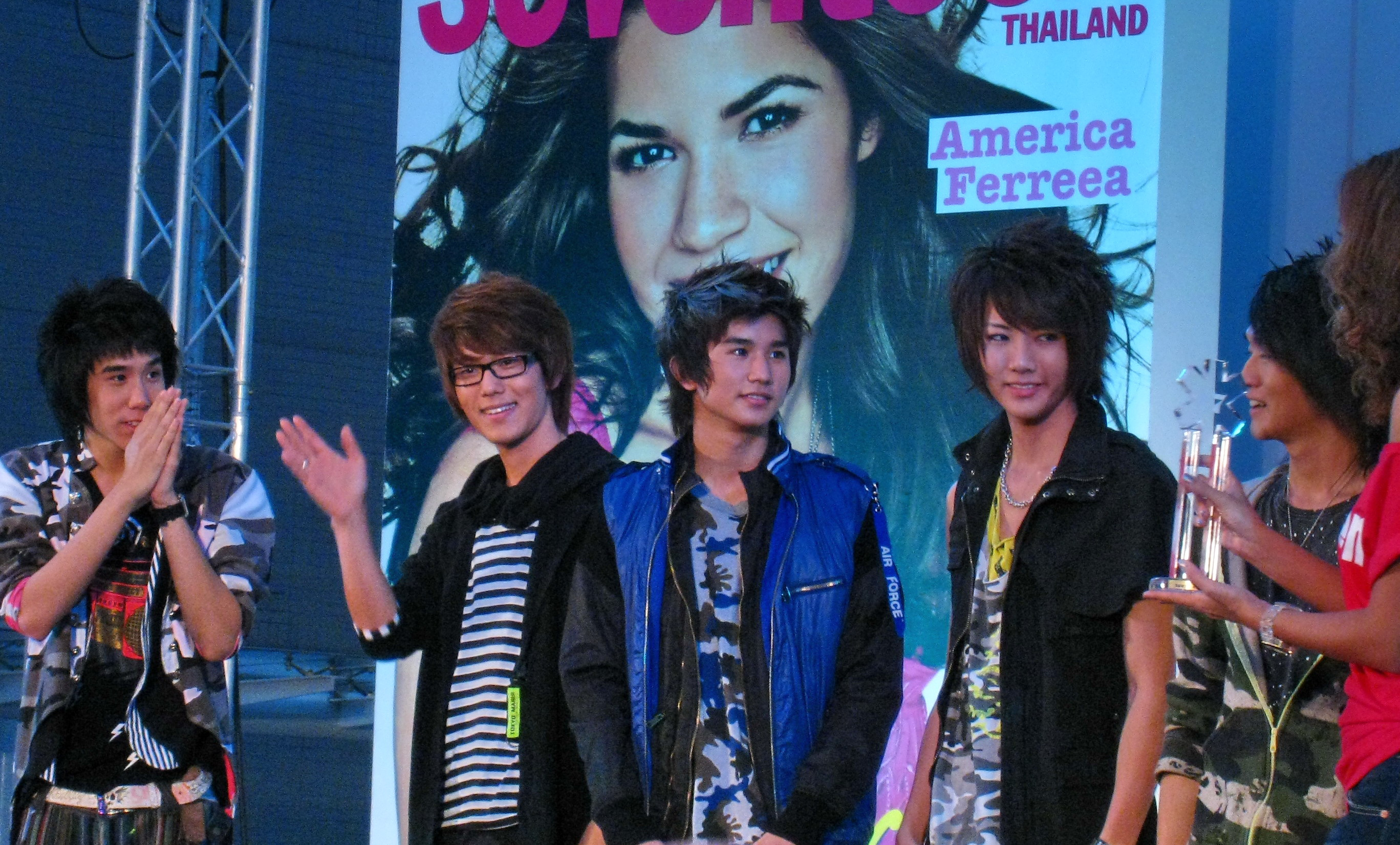
- K-Otic at Seventeen Awards in 2008; L–R: Jongbae, Kenta, Tomo, Poppy, and Koen

Background information
- Origin: Bangkok, Thailand
- Genres: Thai pop, dance-pop, hip hop, R&B
- Years active: 2007–2012
- Label: Kamikaze
- Members: Panu Chiraguna (Poppy); Pataradanai Setsuwan (Koen); Visava Thaiyanont (Tomo); Kenta Tsuchiya (Kenta); Park Jongbae (Jongbae)

K-otic (เค-โอติค) was a Thai pop boy band consisting of five members, two of whom are Thai Japanese and one who is Korean. The band debuted with the single "Ya Wai Chai" in March 2007, releasing their debut album later in October.

The group disbanded in 2012 due to Jongbae's mandatory military service and Poppy's architectural studies. Their final song, Friends, was released to commemorate their five years together.

In 2022, members Tomo, Koen, and Poppy re-debuted as the trio, TKP.

== Members ==
Last Name-Surname	Nickname	Descent	Birthday-Age
Park Jongbae	Jongbae	South Korea	April 7, 1989 (age 37)
Kenta Tsuchiya	Kenta	Japan	April 6, 1990 (age 36)
Visava Thaiyanont	Tomo	Thailand-Japan	June 7, 1990 (age 36)
Panu Chiragun	Poppy	Thailand	March 27, 1991 (age 35)
Pataradanai Setsuwan	Koen	Thailand	January 22, 1992 (age 34)

== Discography ==
=== Studio albums ===
Album details	Track listing
K-OTIC: Year: 2007; Released: 17 October 2007; Label: Kamikaze; Formats: CD/DVD	1. Yah Wai Jai; 2. Ruk Mai Dai Rue Mai Dai Ruk; 3. Ying Harm Ying Ruk; 4. Yoo Nai Chuang Prub Proong; 5. My Girl; 6. Ruk Mai Dai Rue Mai Dai Ruk (Korean ver.)
Blacklist: Year: 2008; Released: 19 November 2008; Label: Kamikaze; Formats: CD/DVD	1. Blacklist; 2. Kae Tur Song Sai; 3. Fan Mai; 4. Rai Tae Ruk; 5. Niew Koi; 6. Black Break (Interlude); 7. Sieng Gub Chun Mai; 8. Rueng Suan Tua; 9. Rai Dieng Sa; 10. Suk Wan Chun Ja Bauk Ruk Tur
Free to Play: Year: 2010; Released: 28 January 2010; Label: Kamikaze; Formats: CD/DVD	1. FREE TO PLAY(December 28, 2009, released on YouTube before add to album); 2. Alone; 3. Step It Up; 4. Secret; 5. Back Together; 6. Love DJ; 7. All on Me; 8. Never Too Late; 9. Deja Vu; 10. Unbelievable (feat.Girly Berry) (October 26, 2009, released on Zheza before add to album)
Real: Year: 2011; Released: 1 May 2011; Label: Kamikaze; Formats: CD/DVD	1. Leave Him; 2. Suffocated; 3. One Wish; 4. Friends; 5. My warning 6. Not your best man

=== Compilations ===
- Kamikaze:Khat Chai (2007)
- Kamikaze:Forward To You (Feb 2008)
- Kamikaze:Friendship Never Ends (Nov 2008)
- Kamikaze:Kamikaze Wave (2010)
- Kamikaze Lover Project (2011)

=== Special Music ===
- Freestyle (2008)

=== Special projects ===
2 High

- Dejavu January 28, (2010) in the album free to play

Monkey Hero

- Unbelievable Feat.Girly Berry October 26, (2009) first released in kotic.myzheza.com and January 28, (2010) in the album free to play

=== Concerts ===
- Kamikaze - Live Concert (2009)
- Kamikaze Wave Concert (2010)
- Kamikaze Lover Concert (2011)
- Kamikaze The 5th Destiny Concert (2012)
- Kamikaze K Fight Concert (2013)

=== TV and film ===
- Scared (Kenta) (2005)
- Gig Number Two (Kenta) (2007)
- Bangkok Kungfu (Tomo) (2011)
- ฟ้ามีตา (Koen) (2014)
- The Iron Ladies 3 (Koen) (2014)
- Pokémon movie (Koen)

=== TV programmes ===
- Kamikaze Club (2009; Poppy, Koen, Tomo)
- K-OTIC Real (2011; Poppy, Koen, Tomo, Kenta, Jongbae)
- KAMIKAZE (2013; Koen, Tomo, Kenta)
- เพลงใครเอ่ย (2014; Koen, Poppy Rookie BB)

== Awards ==
- 2008: Seventeen Magazine's Choice Rising Star as a Group
- 2009: KAZZ Magazine Award - Best Group
- 2009: POP Music Award - Best Idol
- 2009: POP Music Award - Song of the Year
- 2009: POP Music Award - POP Download - KAMIKAZE - Puean Gun Chun Ruk Tur
- 2011: SEED Awards - Best MV 'Alone'
