= Raptor (Thai duo) =

Thai music duo

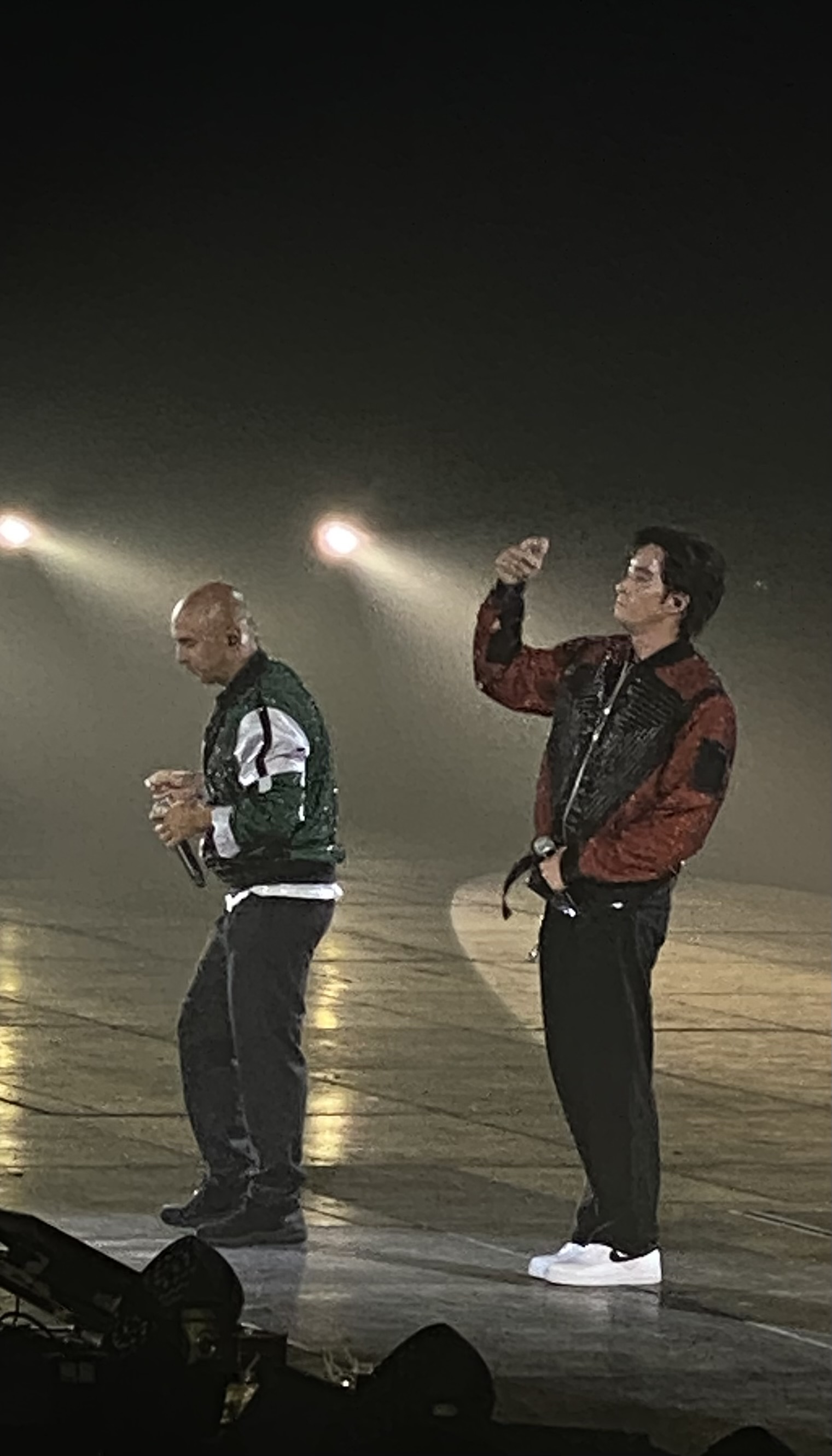
- Raptor in 2023

Background information
- Origin: Bangkok, Thailand
- Genres: Pop; dance-pop
- Years active: 1994–1998; 2011–present
- Label: RS Promotion
- Members: Joni Anwar; Louis Scott

Raptor was a Thai musical duo popular in the 1990s. The duo consisted of two luk khrueng (people of mixed Thai and Caucasoid) boys Joni Anwar and Louis Scott. Their albums Raptor, Waab Boys, Day Shock and Raptor Goodbye each sold over a million copies.

== History ==
Joni Anwar started as child actor in the 1992 Thai movie Toe Laaw Tong Toe (โตแล้วต้องโต๋). They studied in Bangkok Patana School together. Raptor was born because Suea Thanapol, their producer, had the idea after seeing the movie Jurassic Park, as well as the United States' Kris Kross.

Raptor was successful in the 1990s in Thailand and Asia. They sold a million more tape cassettes marketing and tour concerts in Bangkok and other provinces. Joni eventually left to study overseas. They decided to end Raptor with albums Raptor Goodbye and Raptor The Memory. They had another studio album after they split-out of Raptor. They performed a reunion concert in 2011 and continued thereafter.

== Members ==
- Joni Anwar (Indonesian-Scottish)
- Louis Scott (Thai-Scottish)

== Discography ==
=== Studio albums ===
- Raptor 1994
- Waab Boys 1995
- Day Shock 1996
- Raptor Goodbye 1998
- Raptor The Memory 1999

=== Compilation albums ===
- superteens 1996
- The Next 1997
- The Celebration 2001

=== Concerts ===
- Raptor Concert Episode Joni & Louis Ta Lui Hijack 1994 MBK Hall
- Pepsi-Teenology Concert Waab-Z 1996 Hua Mark Indoor Stadium
- Waab Boys Waab Concert 1996 Island Hall Fashion Island
- Yaak Concert 1996 Island Hall Fashion Island
- Munchos Dance Concert Raptor OH Yes! 1998 MBK Hall
- Goodbye Concert Sayonara Raptor 1998 MBK Hall
- RAPTOR 2011 The Concert 2011 Royal Paragon Hall Siam Paragon
- RAPTOR 2012 Encore Concert 2012 Impact Arena

==== Jam Concert ====
- RS. Meeting Concert Book Kaow Olaveng Rongpleang Nabann (Th:บุกเกาะอลเวงร้องเพลงหน้าบาน) (22 Oct 1994) MBK Hall
- RS. Freshy Jam Concert (11 Sep 1995) Thai Army Sports Stadium
- Super Teen Super Concert (17 Feb 1996) Hua Mark Indoor Stadium
- RS. Meeting Concert Tam Ra Beab Ten (TH:ตามระเบียบ...เต้น) (2 Feb 1997) MBK Hall
- Pepsi The Next Generation Concert (18 Jan 1998) MBK Hall
- The Celebration Concert (10 Feb 2001) Hua Mark Indoor Stadium
- RS. Meeting Concert Star Mission Mun Lood Lok (TH:มันหลุดโลก) (22 Dec 2001) Hua Mark Indoor Stadium
- RS. Meeting Concert Return 2013 (18-19 May 2013) Impact Arena
- The Next Venture Concert 2016 ( 6 Mar 2016) Impact Arena

== Filmography ==
- Romantic Blue (โลกทั้งใบให้นายคนเดียว) 1995 Guest lead role by Somchai Kemglad, Suttida Kasemsan Na Ayutthaya
- Extreme Game (เด็กระเบิดยืดแล้วยึด) 1996 lead role by Thanis Yaisamoe, Suttida Kasemsan Na Ayutthaya
- Luk Liew Fiew Ah! 2012

=== Series ===
- Nueng Fah Lang Ka Diew (หนึ่งฟ้าหลังคาเดียว) 2002
- Sawasdee Bangkok (สวัสดีบางกอก) 2009 segment Bangkok Blues
- Dok Som See Thong (ดอกส้มสีทอง) 2011
- Bupphesanniwat (บุพเพสันนิวาส) 2018 (Louis Scott as Constantine Phaulkon)
