= List of Thai actresses =

This is a list of Thai actresses. It is customary for Thais to be grouped by their given name, not their family name, even if they have taken a Western name.

== # ==
- 4Eve

== A ==
- Achiraya Nitibhon
- Amanda Obdam
- Ammara Assawanon
- Aniporn Chalermburanawong
- Ann Thongprasom
- Apasiri Nitipon
- Apinya Sakuljaroensuk
- Aranya Namwong
- Araya A. Hargate
- Arunee Nanthiwat

== B ==
- Benyapa Jeenprasom
- Bhasidi Petchsutee
- Bongkot Kongmalai
- Butsakon Tantiphana

== C ==
- Carissa Springett
- Chaleeda Gilbert
- Chalida Vijitvongthong
- Chalita Suansane
- Chanidapa Pongsilpipat
- Chanikarn Tangkabodee
- Charlotte Austin
- Charm Osathanond
- Chermarn Boonyasak
- Cherprang Areekul
- Chicha Amatayakul
- China Dolls
- Chintara Sukapatana
- Chonnasorn Sajakul
- Chotika Wongwilas
- Chutimon Chuengcharoensukying
- Cindy Bishop
- Cris Horwang

== D ==
- Danupha Khanatheerakul
- Daran Boonyasak
- Davika Hoorne
- Duangjai Hirunsri

== E ==
- Earnearn Fatima
- Engfa Waraha

== F ==
- Farida Waller
- Faye Fang Kaew
- Florence Faivre
- Fonthip Watcharatrakul
- Four-Mod

== G ==
- Gaewalin Sriwanna
- Gena Desouza

== H ==
- Hannah Rosenbloom
- Hong Chau

== I ==
- Intira Jaroenpura

== J ==
- Janie Tienphosuwan
- Jannine Weigel
- Jarinporn Joonkiat
- Jarunee Sooksawat
- Jennie Panhan
- Jennis Oprasert
- Jessica Pasaphan

== K ==
- Kaew Korravee
- Kannarun Wongkajornklai
- Kanokkorn Jaicheun
- Kaothip Tidadin
- Kanya Rattanapetch
- Kanyarat Ruangrung
- Kanyawee Songmuang
- Kanticha Chumma
- Kathaleeya McIntosh
- Katreeya English
- Kemisara Paladesh
- Kesarin Chaichalermpol
- Kessarin Ektawatkul
- Khemanit Jamikorn
- Khemupsorn Sirisukha

== L ==
- Lada Engchawadechasilp
- Lalisa Manobal
- Lalita Panyopas
- Lapassalan Jiravechsoontornkul
- Lena Christensen
- Lydia Sarunrat Deane

== M ==
- Mai Charoenpura
- Maria Poonlertlarp
- Marsha Wattanapanich
- Matika Arthakornsiripho
- Maylada Susri
- Methika Jiranorraphat
- Metinee Kingpayom
- Milin Dokthian
- Mintita Wattanakul
- Minnie (singer)
- Mookda Narinrak
- Morakot Kittisara
- Myra Molloy
- Myria Benedetti

== N ==
- Nalinthip Sakulongumpai
- Namthip Jongrachatawiboon
- Nannaphas Loetnamchoetsakun
- Naowarat Yuktanan
- Napakpapha Nakprasitte
- Napapa Thantrakul
- Napasorn Weerayuttvilai
- Narikun Ketprapakorn
- Narilya Gulmongkolpech
- Natapohn Tameeruks
- Nattasha Bunprachom
- Nattasha Nauljam
- Natthaweeranuch Thongmee
- Natty (Thai singer)
- Neko Jump
- Nichaphat Chatchaipholrat
- Nicole Theriault
- Nisachon Tuamsoongnuen
- Nirut Sirijanya
- Nittha Jirayungyurn
- Nonthawan Bramaz
- Nuttanicha Dungwattanawanich
- Nutticha Namwong

== O ==
- Orn-anong Panyawong

== P ==
- Pansa Vosbein
- Paowalee Pornpimol
- Papassara Techapaibun
- Parada Thitawachira
- Parinya Kiatbusaba
- Patcharapa Chaichua
- Patharawarin Timkul
- Patitta Attayatamavitaya
- Patravadi Mejudhon
- Pattranite Limpatiyakorn
- Pattraphus Borattasuwan
- Paula Taylor
- Paweensuda Drouin
- Peeranee Kongthai
- Penpak Sirikul
- Peraya Malisorn
- Petchara Chaowarat
- Phagkamon Punyabhuti
- Phimonrat Phisarayabud
- Phitchanat Sakhakon
- Phiyada Jutharattanakul
- Pichukkana Wongsarattanasin
- Pimchanok Luevisadpaibul
- Pimolrat Pisolyabutr
- Pimprapa Tangprabhaporn
- Pisamai Vilaisak
- Pitchanart Sakakorn
- Pitchapa Phanthumchinda
- Plearnpichaya Komalarajun
- Ploynira Hiruntaveesin
- Ploypailin Thangprabhaporn
- Ployshompoo Supasap
- Pornnappan Pornpenpipat
- Porntip Papanai
- Prariyapit Yu
- Praya Lundberg
- Preechaya Pongthananikorn
- Pretzelle
- Pumwaree Yodkamol
- Punyawee Jungcharoen

== R ==
- Rachanun Mahawan
- Ranee Campen
- Rasri Balenciaga
- Rattanawadee Wongthong
- Rebecca Patricia Armstrong
- Rhatha Phongam
- Rinrada Kaewbuasai
- Runglawan Thonahongsa
- Rutricha Phapakithi

== S ==
- Samantha Melanie Coates
- Sananthachat Thanapatpisal
- Sansanee Wattananukul
- Sao Sao Sao
- Sarocha Chankimha
- Sarunchana Apisamaimongkol
- Sammy Cowell
- Savitree Suttichanond
- Sinjai Plengpanich
- Siriyakorn Pukkavesh
- Sizzy
- Sonia Couling
- Sriarpha Ruennak
- Sririta Jensen Narongdej
- Stella Malucchi
- Suangporn Jaturaphut
- Suangsuda Lawanprasert
- Sunnee
- Supaksorn Chaimongkol
- Suphakorn Sriphothong
- Suppanad Jittaleela
- Supassara Thanachat
- Sushar Manaying
- Sutatta Udomsilp
- Suvanant Kongying

== T ==
- Tachakorn Boonlupyanun
- Tai Orathai
- Taksaorn Paksukcharern
- Tanchanok Good
- Tata Young
- Thasorn Klinnium
- Thikamporn Ritta-apinan
- Thikaporn Bunyalieang
- Tipnaree Weerawatnodom
- Tisanart Sornsuek
- Tontawan Tantivejakul
- Treechada Petcharat
- Tussaneeya Karnsomnut

== U ==
- Ungsumalynn Sirapatsakmetha
- Urassaya Sperbund

== V ==
- Vanessa Herrmann
- Violette Wautier
- Viphada Jatuyosporn
- Virahya Pattarachokchai

== W ==
- Wannarot Sonthichai
- Wanwimol Jaenasavamethee
- Warattaya Nilkuha
- Waruntorn Paonil
- Weluree Ditsayabut
- Wichayanee Pearklin
- Woranut Wongsawan
- Worarat Suwannarat
- Worranit Thawornwong

== Y ==
- Yaimai Shinaradee
- Yanin Vismitananda
- Yarinda Bunnag
- Yol Pranvarin
- Yongwaree Anilbol
