= Atitaya Tribudarak =

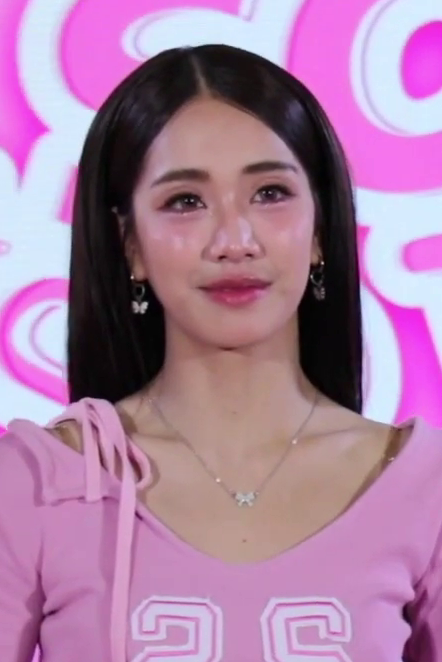
- Atitaya in 2025

Background information
- Born: June 9, 1999 (age 27); Sattahip District, Chonburi Province
- Genres: T-pop; Pop; Dance pop; Hip-hop
- Occupations: Singer; dancer; actress
- Instrument: Vocal
- Years active: 2017–present
- Label: XOXO Entertainment
- Member of: 4Eve

Atitaya Tribudarak (born 9 June 1999), nickname Mind, is a Thai singer, dancer, and actress. She is a member and leader of Thai girl group 4Eve.

== Personal life and education ==
Atitaya completed high school education at Mareewittaya School, Pattaya and holds a bachelor's degree from the College of Social Communication Innovation, Srinakharinwirot University.

== Career ==
Atitaya joined a dance competition, having trained for 2 years and won the Top 5 award in the first year of the competition. Atitaya has also acted in 2 Ratchadalai stage plays, Banlang Mek and Four Reigns as ensemble cast, as well as many well-known TV dramas such as Game Rak Ao Khuen.

In 2020, Atitaya competed in the show Girl Group Star and became a member of the newly formed girl group 4Eve under XOXO Entertainment. She was chosen as number one by the judges and received the most votes from viewers at home.

In 2022, Atitaya played her first leading role in the drama Nang Nak Sapai Phra Khanong opposite Jirayu La-ongmanee, who played Mark. The drama aired on Workpoint TV. In 2024, she starred in Kongkiat Komesiri's film Bangkok Breaking, opposite Sukollawat Kanarot, which aired on Netflix.
