= Only You (Thai TV series) =

2025 Thai television series

- Promotional poster
- Thai: เพียงเธอ
- Genre: Action; Drama; Girls' love
- Written by: Piyaporn Wayuparp; Saratswadee Wongsomphet
- Directed by: Saratswadee Wongsomphet
- Starring: Kornnaphat Sethratanapong; Lingling Kwong
- Country of origin: Thailand
- Original language: Thai
- No. of episodes: 14

Production
- Cinematography: Ruengwit Ramsoot
- Running time: 46–49 minutes
- Production company: BEC World Original

Original release
- Network: Channel 3
- Release: 18 July – 17 October 2025

Only You (Thai: เพียงเธอ; RTGS: Phiang Thoe) is a Thai action-girls' love television series produced by Channel 3 starring Kornnaphat Sethratanapong (Orm) and Lingling Kwong in their second project together after The Secret of Us (2024). It premiered on Channel 3 on 18 July 2025 and airs every Friday at 20:30 ICT, and was made available for streaming on Netflix.

== Synopsis ==
Back in their school days, Tawan (Lingling Kwong) and Ayla (Kornnaphat Sethratanapong) met on a rainy night. As days passed, they grew naturally close, a tender fondness quietly blooming between them—until Tawan suddenly left without a word.

Eight years later, Ayla has established herself as an idol singer, gaining recognition while facing unwanted attention and security threats. Meanwhile, Tawan has built a career by running a private security firm. Their paths cross again when Ayla hires Tawan's company for personal protection, bringing them together once more in the roles of client and bodyguard.

Ayla doesn’t hide her feelings this time; she instead sets out to win Tawan’s heart, while Tawan is torn between professional duty and the feelings she thought she had long buried.

== Cast ==
=== Main ===
- Kornnaphat Sethratanapong as Sasina "Ayla" Ruengkhunakhon (Thai: ศศินา เรืองคุณากร)
- Lingling Kwong as Rawee "Tawan" Saewang (Thai: รวี แซ่หวัง)

=== Supporting ===
- Khemupsorn Sirisukha as president of BEC Music
- Mary Kate Gardner as Sudsinee Sawangkhamon (Thai: เพื่อนสนิทของไอร่า)
- Thanchanok Yutthasarnsiri as Narawan Nammhak (Thai: นราวรรณ นามมาก)
- Nisachon Tuamsoongnuen as Chanya Nanwichai (Thai: ชัญญา นันวิชัย)
- Paswitch Boorananut as Typhoon Phoopha (Thai: ไต้ฝุ่น ภูผา)
- Supoj Janjareonborn as Thana Ruengkhunakhon (Thai: ธนา เรืองคุณากร), Ayla's father
- Apinan Prasertwattanakul as Sangklot Saewang (Thai: ทรงกลด แซ่หวัง), Tawan's father
- Krittakan Prasitpanit as Mek, Tawan's older brother
- Mayurin Pongpudpunth as Duangnet, Songklot's wife
- Thidarut Pruethong as Savitree (Thai: สาวิตรี)
- Peerakrit Phacharaboonyakiat as Pete (Thai: พีท)
- Pimploy Phanjachaiyokul as Ky (Thai: กี้)

== Episodes ==
No. in series	Title	Directed by	Written by	Original release date
1	"Episode 1"	Nay Saratswadee Wongsomphet	Jaotarn Piyaporn Wayuparp	18 July 2025
Tawan and Ayla get close at school after the former protects latter from a group of bullies, but one of them takes a secret decision that causes them to drift apart.
2	"Episode 2"	Nay Saratswadee Wongsomphet	Jaotarn Piyaporn Wayuparp	25 July 2025
After receiving a menacing gift at work, Ayla, who is now famous, looks for a bodyguard and ends up in Tawan.
3	"Episode 3"	Nay Saratswadee Wongsomphet	Jaotarn Piyaporn Wayuparp	1 August 2025
Tawan is hurt in an unexpected attack, and a worried Ayla looks out for her personal information from the other bodyguards.
4	"Episode 4"	Nay Saratswadee Wongsomphet	Jaotarn Piyaporn Wayuparp	8 August 2025
After Ayla gets into problems while she is in charge, Tawan and her team get a lead in their case, but she soon has to make a tough choice.
5	"Episode 5"	Nay Saratswadee Wongsomphet	Jaotarn Piyaporn Wayuparp	15 August 2025
In order to concentrate on her work, Tawan avoids Ayla, but things soon get complicated. She later confesses something unexpected.
6	"Episode 6"	Nay Saratswadee Wongsomphet	Jaotarn Piyaporn Wayuparp	22 August 2025
Following Ayla's sincere admission, she and Tawan take a peaceful camping vacation in the woods to start a new chapter in their love.
7	"Episode 7"	Nay Saratswadee Wongsomphet	Jaotarn Piyaporn Wayuparp	29 August 2025
As Tawan questions her father about his tumultuous history with Ayla's father, Mr. Thana locks Ayla away, preventing the two from becoming a pair.
8	"Episode 8"	Nay Saratswadee Wongsomphet	Jaotarn Piyaporn Wayuparp	5 September 2025
Ayla makes a bold escape to see Tawan and live her own life when Mr. Thana employs a new security squad to manage her life and career.
9	"Episode 9"	Nay Saratswadee Wongsomphet	Jaotarn Piyaporn Wayuparp	12 September 2025
After rumors started, Tawan and Ayla make their relationship public drawing the ire of their feuding fathers.

== Original soundtrack ==
No.	Title	Lyrics	Music	Artist	Length
1.	"Moonlight"	ปลาทอง ธัญนันท์	ปลาทอง ธัญนันท์	Lingling Kwong	3:49
2.	"ระยะไกลของดวงจันทร์"	ปลาทอง ธัญนันท์	ปลาทอง ธัญนันท์	Kornnaphat Sethratanapong	3:29
3.	"ยืนหนึ่ง"	นราธิป ปานแร่		Kornnaphat Sethratanapong	2:44

== Production ==
On September 8, 2024, a teaser photo of the series was released at the second joint fan meeting of lead actresses Sethratanapong and Kwong. On May 17, 2025, the official premiere date of July 18 was announced at LingOrm Birthday Charity 2025.

== Awards and nominations ==
Award nominations for Only You
Year	Award	Category	Nominee(s)	Result	Ref.
2026	Y Entertain Awards 2026	Best Series OST of the Year	"ระยะไกลของดวงจันทร์"	Nominated	
2026	Feed x Khaosod Awards 2026	Girls' Love Actress of the Year	Kornnaphat Sethratanapong	Won	
