= Plerng Prang Tian =

Thai television series

- Also known as: Candle Fire; Candle in the Sun
- Original title: เพลิงพรางเทียน
- Genre: Thriller; Romance; Drama; Historical
- Written by: หัสวีร์
- Screenplay by: ปานตะวัน
- Directed by: วรวิทย์ ศรีสุภาพ
- Starring: Pongsakorn Mettarikanon; Nuttanicha Dungwattanawanich; Nattasha Bunprachom; Nawasch Phupantachsee
- Opening theme: ไม่อยากรักใคร ถ้าไม่ใช่เธอ - Bowling Manida
- Ending theme: แบ่งใจ - ชวิน จิตรสมบูรณ์
- Country of origin: Thailand
- Original language: Thai
- No. of episodes: 12

Production
- Production locations: Chiang Mai, Thailand
- Running time: 150 min
- Production company: Good Feeling

Original release
- Network: Channel 3
- Release: May 18 – June 14, 2019

Related
- Wai Sab Saraek Kad 2; Nee Ruk Nai Krong Fai

Plerng Prang Tian (Thai: เพลิงพรางเทียน, RTGS: Phloeng Phrang Thian, lit. 'the fire obscures the candle') is a 2019 Thai lakorn. The lakorn is based on a novel written by หัสวีร์. It was directed by วรวิทย์ ศรีสุภาพ and produced by Good Feeling. It starred Pongsakorn Mettarikanon, Nuttanicha Dungwattanawanich, Nattasha Bunprachom, and Nawasch Phupantachsee. It was aired on Channel 3.

== Synopsis ==
The film tells the love story of Tiankhum (Nuttanicha Dungwattanawanich), an innocent girl who falls in love with Prince Taywarit (Pongsakorn Mettarikanon), a playboy and husband to Princess Wongduen (Nattasha Bunprachom).

In the present, Kalin is a famous model who got caught in a scandal. Kalin receives a mystery golden hairpin that takes her back to the past as Tiankhum to get her revenge.

== Cast ==
=== Main ===
- Pongsakorn Mettarikanon as In Wiangraming (Present) / Prince Taywarit (Past)
- Nuttanicha Dungwattanawanich as Kalin Raweerampa (Present) / Kaew / Tiankhum (Past)
  - Supapat Phoncharoenrat as Kalin (Young) / Tiankhum (Young)
- Nattasha Bunprachom as Patima (Present) / Princess Wongduen (Past)
- Nawasch Phupantachsee as Benjamin Henry (Present) / Louis (Past)

=== Supporting ===
- Maneerat Sricharoon as Saiparn (Present) / Ounhuan (Past)
- Nisachon Tuamsoongnuen as Pam (Present) / Paika (Past)
- Chanon Rikulsurakan as Nao
- New Narissan
- Kin Karun Aramsri as Max
- Sutthatip Wutichaipradit as Pangrum
- Chamaiporn Jaturaput as Dutsadee (Present) / Lady Choreuang (Past)
- Khwanruedi Klomklom as Tharnthong (Present) / Khampor (Past)
- Athiwad Sanidwong na Ayutthaya as Lord Wiangsawan (Past)
- Thanayong Wongtrakul as Nankaew
- Natha Lloyd as Soisangwan
- Jack Chakapan as Kampaeng
- Lorena Schuett as Nim (Nao's girlfriend)
- Thongthong Mokjok as Meesua

=== Guests ===
- Sukol Sasijulaka as Kalin's father
- Jirawat Wachirasarunpat as Noiphutthawong
- Oliver Pupart as Peter Henry (Benjamin's father)
- Chanokwanun Rakcheep as Hathai (Benjamin's mother)
- Surasak Chaiat as Suang (In's father)
- Tarinda Kannasut as Kalin's stepmom
- Kochakorn Nimakorn as Pongsri (Patima's mother)
- Chanana Nutakom as Kanomkluay's mother
- Viyada Umarin as Psychic
- Krit Atthaseri

== Ratings ==
In this table, the blue numbers represent the lowest ratings and the red numbers represent the highest ratings.

| Ep. | Original broadcast date | | |
| Ep. | Original broadcast date | Nationwide | Ref. |
|---|---|---|---|
| 1 | May 18, 2019 | 2.5% | |
| 2 | May 19, 2019 | 2.6% | |
| 3 | May 24, 2019 | 2.9% | |
| 4 | May 25, 2019 | 3.3% | |
| 5 | May 26, 2019 | 3.5% | |
| 6 | May 31, 2019 | 2.8% | |
| 7 | June 1, 2019 | 3.3% | |
| 8 | June 2, 2019 | 3.8% | |
| 9 | June 7, 2019 | 4.1% | |
| 10 | June 8, 2019 | 4.2% | |
| 11 | June 9, 2019 | 4.8% | |
| 12 | June 14, 2019 | 4.9% | |
| Average | | 3.55% | |

== Original soundtrack ==
| Song title | Artist | Notes | Ref. |
|---|---|---|---|
| ไม่อยากรักใคร ถ้าไม่ใช่เธอ | Bowling Manida | Opening theme | |
| แบ่งใจ | ชวิน จิตรสมบูรณ์ | Closing theme | |

== Reception ==
After airing the first and second episodes, the lakorn received great feedback. The hashtag of the lakorn trended at first place on Twitter in Thailand with the first two episodes. Nuttanicha Dungwattanawanich was praised by the audience although it was the first time she played this kind of character.

In March 2020 that Plerng Prang Tian was released on Netflix Thailand.
