= Korranid Laosubinprasoet =

Thai singer and actress

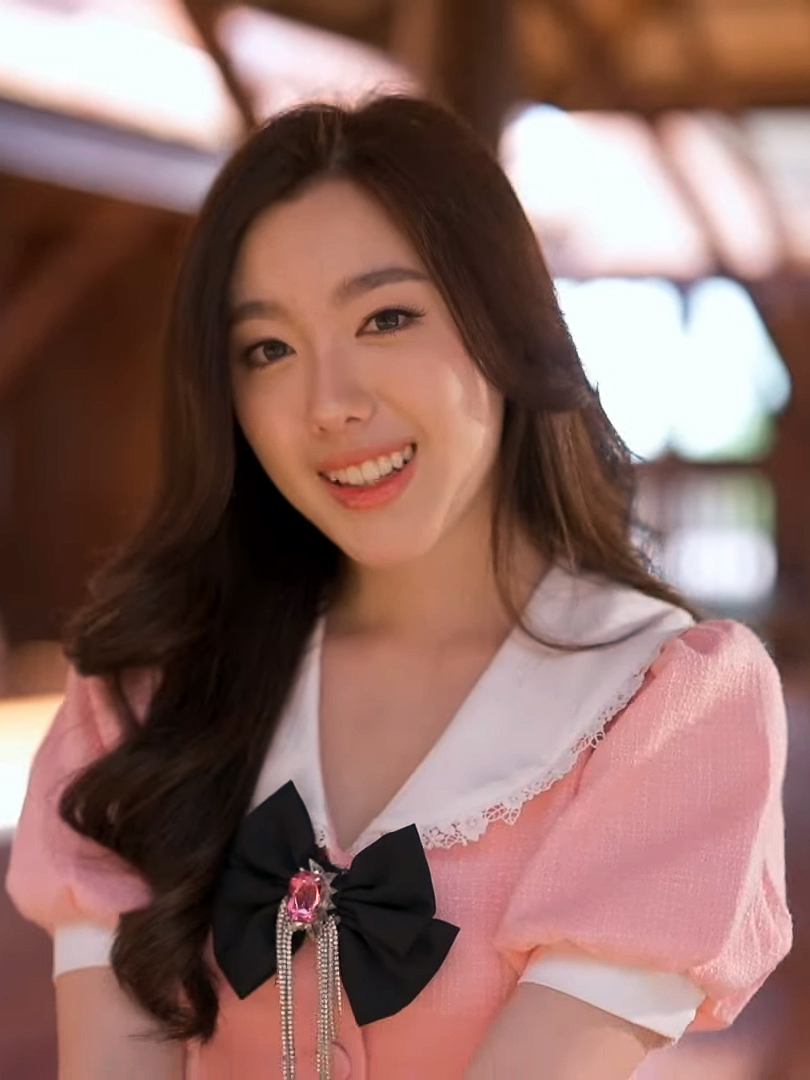
- Laosubinprasoet in 2024

Background information
- Born: June 9, 2005 (age 21); Bangkok, Thailand
- Occupations: Singer; actress
- Years active: 2013–present
- Label: XOXO Entertainment
- Member of: 4EVE

Korranid Laosubinprasoet (Thai: กรณิศ เล้าสุบินประเสริฐ; born 9 June 2005), nicknamed Aheye (pronounced "Ah-eye"), is a Thai singer, actress, and model. She is a member of Thai girl group 4Eve. Laosubinprasoet has starred in several Thai dramas aired on Channel 3, including Thang Phan Kam Thep (ทางผ่านกามเทพ), Montrali Hong (มนต์ระลาหงส์), Pikaew Nang Hong (ปี่แก้วนางหงส์), Nuan Lupp Salab Love (หน่วยลับสลับเลิฟ), Sorn Ngao Rak (ซ่อนเงารัก), and Wasana Rak (วาสนารัก).

== Early life and education ==
Korranid Laosubinprasoet was born on June 9, 2005, in Bangkok, Thailand. She graduated primary and lower secondary school from Pantharat School, Din Daeng. For upper secondary school, she studied at the Demonstration School of Srinakharinwirot University, Prasanmit, majoring in music. In 2023, she entered the undergraduate program major in acting and directing for film at the College of Social Communication Innovation, Srinakharinwirot University before transferring to Bangkok University in 2024.

== Career ==
Korranid had been enrolling in singing lessons since she was young. At the age of 7, she began her journey in the entertainment industry as an actress. Her debut acting role was in the TV series Yomban Chao Kha aired in 2013.

Apart from acting, she also participated in singing contests on various programs, beginning with The Trainer Season 5 in 2013. During the competition, she showcased her talent by singing three songs, changing her stage outfits, and incorporating dance into her performance. In 2014, she participated in The Voice Kids Thailand Season 2 and reached the final. This further increased Laosubinprasoet's recognition, leading to additional opportunities. Then, in 2017, Laosubinprasoet joined the We Kid Thailand program, where she sang "Kwam Nai Jai" by Suthep Wongkamhaeng.

In 2018, Laosubinprasoet received an invitation to speak at the TEDx Bangkok conference. During her presentation, she expressed her views on the aspirations of children in shaping both the present and the future. Additionally, she performed the song Nang Nual by Thongchai McIntyre, which depicts the dream of a seagull longing to soar towards the horizon.

In 2020, Laosubinprasoet took part in the program Girl Group Stars, which aired on Workpoint TV Thailand. The competition aimed to find members for a new Thai girl group called 4Eve. In the competition, she stood out as the most outstanding talent. After receiving the MVP hats, she was selected as one of the seven members of 4Eve, becoming the youngest member of the group.

In 2020, she was cast in the role of Klai Ruang, a young li-kay actress from Nakhon Sawan province, in the television drama Wansana Rak. Her performance in the drama earned her the Suphannahong Award for Best Rising Female Star from the Association of Radio and Television News Journalists of Thailand.

In 2024, she took on the role of the female lead in Channel 3's period drama Ruean Tard (เรือนทาส).
