= Nawasch Phupantachsee =

Thai actor and model (born 1996)

- ณวัสน์ ภู่พันธัชสีห์
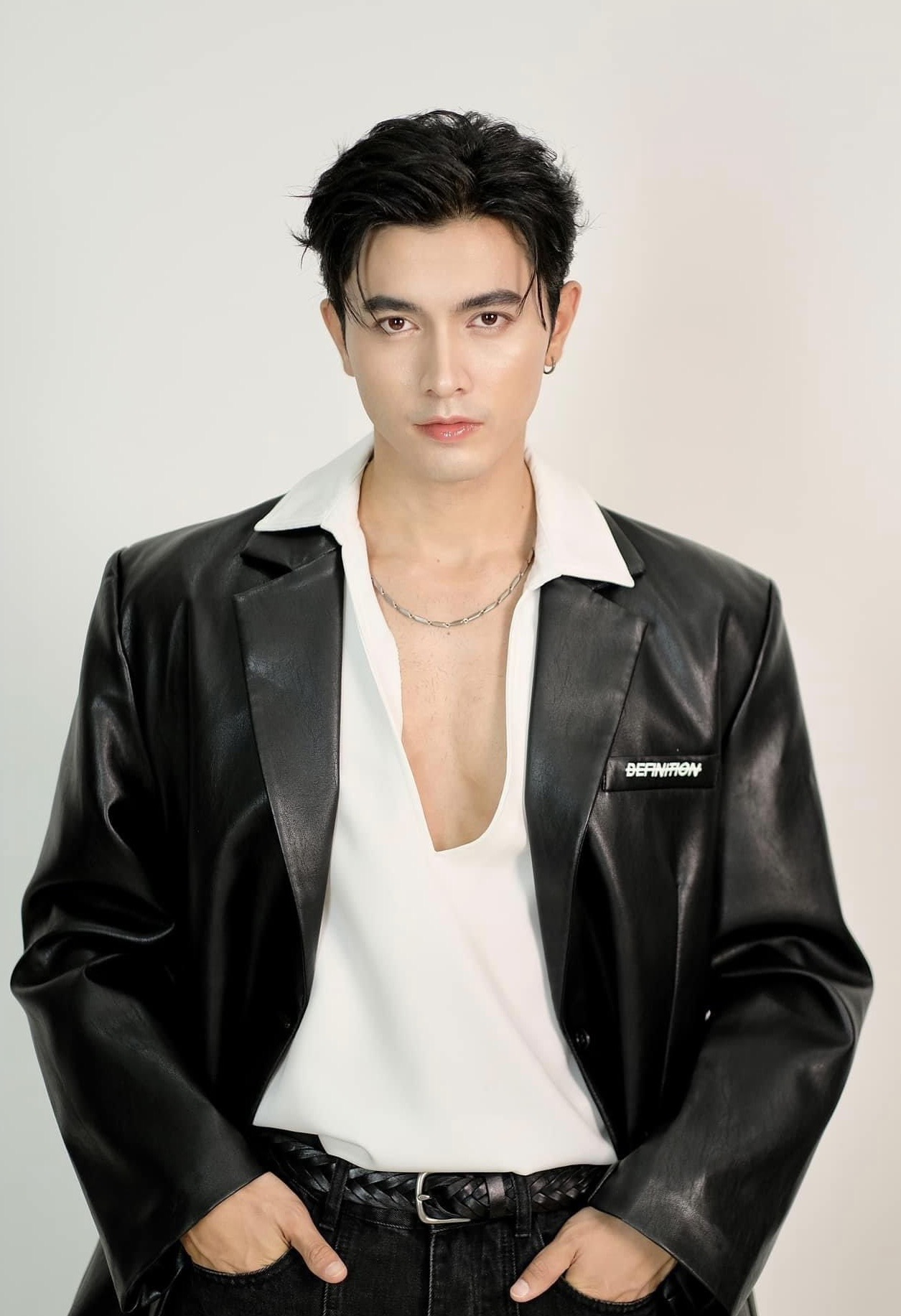
- Born: Nawasch Phupantachsee; January 15, 1996 (age 30); Bangkok, Thailand
- Other name: Pon Nawasch
- Education: King Mongkut's Institute of Technology Ladkrabang– Faculty of Engineering
- Occupation: Actor
- Years active: 2015–present
- Agent: Channel 3 HD (2015–present)
- Notable work: Trabarb See Chompoo (2018); Plerng Prang Tian (2019); My Himalayan Embrace (2020) Praomook (2021)
- Height: 1.85 m (6 ft 1 in)

YouTube information
- Channel: PonNawasch Channel

Nawasch Phupantachsee (Thai: ณวัสน์ ภู่พันธัชสีห์; born 15 January 1996) nicknamed Pon. (Thai: ภณ), is a Thai actor. Nawasch is known for his role in the television series Tra Barb See Chompoo (2018) and Praomook (2021).

== Early life and education ==
Nawasch was born on January 15, 1996, in Bangkok, Thailand. His immediate family includes his mother, father, a brother and a sister. His father Lieutenant General Tattthongak Phupantachsee is the Provincial Police Chief of Satun province and his mother Chanutaporn Wisitsophon is a former actress who has acted in the famous film Phuean Phaeng (1983) and Ploy Talay.

When Nawasch was a child, he attended Ramkhamhaeng University Demonstration School. He received secondary education from Bodindecha (Sing Singhaseni) School. He graduated from the Faculty of Engineering, King Mongkut's Institute of Technology Ladkrabang with a Bachelor's degree (2nd class honors) in Music and Multimedia Engineering.

== Career ==
=== 2015–2017: Beginnings ===
In 2015, Nawasch entered the entertainment industry when he was still studying in the university. He was invited to the Phra Maha Phichai Crown ceremony to receive the adornment of the Buddha statue situated in Lat Krabang district. He participated in the "Young star Mekhala, Year 2013" contest and won the Photographer's Favorite award. He was also the winner of the WoW Young Man award from the Miner Young Wink Contest.

In 2017, Nawasch made his acting debut by playing Panthit, a new film director in the drama Sai Lub Jub Abb. Later, he received an opportunity to feature in Sanae Rak Nang Cin, playing Touch, owner of a textile company.

=== 2018–present: Rising popularity ===
In 2018, Nawasch played his first leading role in the drama Tra Barb See Chompoo, alongside Nalinthip Sakulongumpai. The series was a success both domestically and internationally. Nawasch gained widespread recognition and popularity for his portrayal of Pete, who struggles to deal with emotion and wants revenge. He won the Best Actor award at the 2019 Kazz Awards for his performance.

In 2019, he starred in the lakorn Plerng Prang Tian. Then he played supporting roles in several drama.

In 2021, Nawasch starred in the drama "Praomook". He played the role of Chalunthorn or Lan opposite actress Nalinthip Sakulongumpai, who played the role of Praomook, creating a very peculiar story in which it starts with a love-hate relationship. But eventually they will begin to fall in love with each other and will face many obstacles on their way.

== Private Life ==
In relationship with actress Yada Suwanpattana, known as "Cookie"
Nawasch and Yada have similar lifestyles like extreme sports, running, cycling and swimming, so they've been called as "Running Couple"

== Filmography ==
=== Television series ===
Year	Title	Role	Network	Notes
2017	Sai Lub Jub Abb	Panthit	Channel 3	Support Role
2018	Sanae Rak Nang Cin	Touch	Channel 3	
2018	Tra Barb See Chompoo	Phatsakorn Phrompitak (Khun Peat)	Channel 3	
2019	Nuay Lub Salub Love	Anakim (Kim / Khieng)	Channel 3	Cameo
2019	Plerng Prang Tian	Louis (former) / Benjamin (current)	Channel 3	
2020	Toong Sanaeha	Pol.Maj.Nawasch Phupantachsee (Inspector Nawasch)	Channel 3	Cameo
2020	My Himalayan Embrace	Santharakat (Sky)	Channel 3	
2021	Praomook	Chalanthorn Ananthanapat (Lan)	Channel 3	
2022	My Friend, The Enemy	Naruebodi Pongsadilok (Nick)	Channel 3	
2023	Devil-in-Law	Noppanai Wongkulthanasub (Nai)	Channel 3	
2023	Love in a Cage	Doctor Pas	Channel 3	
2023	Love Destiny 2	General Anilbot	Channel 3	Guest
2025	Khun Phee Jao Kha Dichan Pen Harn Mi Chai Hong	Khun Chai (Former) / Chat (Current)	Channel 3	
2025	Eight Count (Nub 8)	Tan Prabsadthroopai	Channel 3	[Eng Sub] Trailer Pilot of Eight Count
2025	Yiwa Datang	Yiam	Channel 3	
2025	Thatri	Thatri Thatriphan (Thri / Na'Ree)	Channel 3	
2025	Keb Pandin 2020	Lt.Chonlachart Ratcharit	Channel 3	
Waiting to be aired			Channel 3	
Shooting			Channel 3	

=== Movie ===
Year	Title	Role	Company
2023	GHOST’S NEWS	Mek	Sangnang Production
2024	The 4 Dangers	Aon	Siam Ravin

=== Short film ===
Year	Title	Role
2019	Short Film MV "Sa Bai Dee Rue (How are you)" สบายดีหรือ	Nut
2020	Short Film MV “Ploi (Release)” ปล่อย	Nut

=== Music video ===
Year	Song	Artist
2019	"Sa Bai Dee Rue" (How are you) สบายดีหรือ	Num Kala
2020	“Ploi" (Release) ปล่อย	Num Kala
2021	"Jai (Mai) Rai" (Not) Unkind ใจ(ไม่)ร้าย	Yes'sir Days

== Concert & Fanmeeting ==
- "Jood Ruam PON First Stage" Fan Meeting (2023)
- Meet the Love of Pon Nawasch (2023)
- Fan Meet Greet Online MAN IN THE RAIN "Stuck in the rain with Pon Nawasch" (2020)
- Channel 3 Super Fan Live!: SUPERNOVA Universe Explosion Concert
- 2 Handsome Guys Show: PON-MASU Fanmeeting (2019)
- Pon Nawasch The 1st Fan Meeting: This is me Pon Nawasch (2019)

== Presenter & Brand Ambassador ==
- Asics (2023-present)
- Moccona Select (2023-present)
- TOT Easy Life / TOT Fiber 2U (2019-2020)

== Awards ==
Year	Nominated work	Award	Category	Result	Ref.
2019	Tra Barb See Chompoo	Kazz Awards 2019	Best Actor	Won	
2019	—N/a	Kid Sai Idol Honor Plaque	Role model for children and youth	Won	
2019	Tra Barb See Chompoo	4th Nagara Award	Rising Star of the Year	Won	
2019	—N/a	Thailand Headlines 2019	Culture and Entertainment Person of the Year	Won	
2020	—N/a	Kazz Awards 2020	Young Bang of the Year	Won	
2020	—N/a	HOWE Awards 2020	HOWE Popular Actor	Won	
2021	Praomook	Siam Series Awards 2020	The Beloved actor of Thailand Headlines & ManGu	Won	
2021	—N/a	Kazz Awards 2021	Young Bang of the Year	Won	
2021	Praomook	Maya Awards	People's Favorite Couple (Nawasch Phupantachsee & Nalinthip Sakulongumpai)	Won	
2024	—N/a	60th Anniversary “Dailynews” Celebration	Dailynews Star 2024	Won	
