= Hannah Rosenbloom =

Laotian-American singer

- แฮนน่า โรเซ็นบรูม
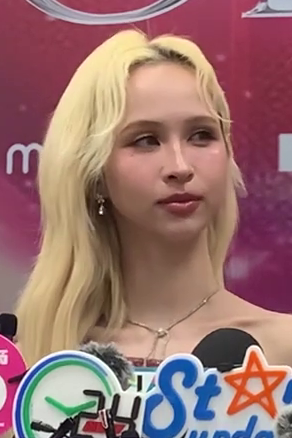
- Rosenbloom in 2025
- Born: July 5, 2001 (age 25); Bangkok, Thailand
- Citizenship: Laos
- Occupations: Singer; Dancer; Actress
- Years active: 2017 – Present
- Musical career
- Genres: T-pop; Pop; Dance pop; Hip hop
- Instrument: Vocals
- Years active: 2017 – Present
- Label: XOXO Entertainment
- Member of: 4Eve

Hannah Rosenbloom (Thai: แฮนน่า โรเซ็นบรูม, Lao: ແຮ່ນນ້າ ໂຣເຊັນບູມ, born July 5, 2001) is a Laotian–American pop singer, model and actress. She is a member of Thai girl group 4Eve.

== Biography ==
Hannah Rosenbloom was born in Bangkok, Thailand on July 5, 2001, to a Laotian mother and an American father. She lived in Thailand until the age of 8 before moving back to Laos with her family.

At the age of 14, Rosenbloom participated in a singing competition but did not qualify for the finals; after attending the year afterward, she managed to qualify for the final round. In 2019, Rosenbloom ranked in second place at Miss Teen Laos; she also won Miss Social Media at Miss Asia Global both in 2019 and 2020. After reaching the top 3 in a supermodel contest, Rosenbloom was offered roles in four Laotian television series.

In 2020, Rosenbloom participated in Thai survival show 4Eve Girl Group Star and managed to become one of the seven winners who were selected to become a member of the Thai idol group 4Eve.

In 2023, Rosenbloom played the main role in Laotian horror movie The Signal directed by Lee Phongsavanh and received a nomination for Best New Actress at Shanghai International Film Festival. The same year, Rosenbloom played Kokarot in Thai drama series A Match by Maid.

== Discography ==
=== Singles ===
Title	Year	Album
As lead artist
"Forever" (with James Anthony)	2022	Non album-single
Collaborations
"Falling in Love With You Was The Easiest Thing I've Ever Done" (ตกหลุมรักเธอคือเรื่องง่ายที่สุด) (Yes'Sir Day feat. 4Eve Hannah)	2023	Non album-singles
"Succubus (Baddie Edition)" (Galchanie feat. 4Eve Hannah)	2023	Non album-singles
Soundtrack appearances
"Wrong Plan" (ผิดแผน) (with Poom from Atlas)	2023	A Match by Maid OST
"Bittersweet" (รสชาติรักแรก)	2025	Game of Succession OST

== Filmography ==
=== Film ===
Year	Title	Role	Notes	Ref.
2023	Loser Lover		Guest role	
2023	The Signal	Nammon		

=== Television series ===
Year	Title	Role	Notes	Ref.
2017	On Your Side Season 1		Web series	
2017	Badfriend	Liza	Webseries	
2019	Diary Love	Nene	Web series	
2021	One Love	Meow	Web series	
2023	A Match by Maid	Kokarot		

== Awards and nominations ==
Name of the award ceremony, year presented, category, nominee of the award, and the result of the nomination
Award	Year	Category	Nominee/work	Result	Ref.
Kazz Awards	2022	Young Girl of the Year	Hannah Rosenbloom	Won	
Kazz Awards	2024	Rising Female of the Year	Hannah Rosenbloom	Nominated	
Muan's People of the Year	2020	International Star	Hannah Rosenbloom	Won	
Shanghai International Film Festival	2023	Best New Actress	Hannah Rosenbloom	Nominated	
