= Bodindecha (Sing Singhaseni) School =

Coordinates: 13°46′05.27″N 100°36′53.60″E

- โรงเรียนบดินทรเดชา (สิงห์ สิงหเสนี)

Location
- 40 Ramkhamhaeng Road Soi 43/1, Phlap Phla, Wang Thong Lang, Bangkok 10310; Thailand

Information
- Other name: Bodin
- Type: Public school, Secondary school
- Motto: Thai: ลูกบดินทรเป็นผู้ประพฤติดีและมีความรู้ (Virtue and Wisdom)
- Established: April 30, 1971; 55 years ago
- Founder: Lady Boonluean Kruatrachue
- School code: 10022032
- Director: Kanyapuk Kanphuwanan, PhD
- Grades: 7–12 (Mathayom 1–6)
- Gender: Co-educational
- Campus size: 39 rai 3 ngan 86 square wah (6.3944 hectare)
- Colour: Blue
- Song: Thong Nam Ngoen
- Website: http://www.bodin.ac.th

Bodindecha (Sing Singhaseni) School (Thai : โรงเรียนบดินทรเดชา (สิงห์ สิงหเสนี)) is a public high school in Wang Thong Lang, Bangkok, Thailand. It was founded on April 30, 1971, by Lady Bunluen Kruetrachu, who was assigned from the Department of General Education(Office of the Basic Education Commission at present).

The school is named in honour of Chao Phraya Bodindecha, also known as Sing Singhaseni, who was a Samuha Nayok (สมุหนายก) the Chancellor under King Rama III of Siam.

== History ==
The school was established based on the vision of Chao Phraya Bodindecha (Sing Singhaseni), who believed that "a school is a place to trap evil and a place to teach humanity."

This vision was carried on by his great-granddaughter, Khunying Nakhon Ratchaseni (Chuea Singhaseni), who in 1964 donated the plot of land—which had formerly been his military quarters—to the Ministry of Education. In 1968, the Department of General Education assigned Lady Bunluen Kruetrachu, the director of Triam Udom Suksa School at the time, to take responsibility for the establishment of the school.

Key Milestones:

- April 30, 1971: The Ministry of Education officially announced the school's establishment.
- May 7, 1971: The foundation stone laying ceremony for the first building was held.
- 1971 Academic Year: Mr. Chalerm Singhaseni was appointed as the first headmaster. The school accepted its first generation (B.D. 1), totaling 838 students. As the campus was not yet complete, students studied temporarily at Triam Udom Suksa School.
- February 23, 1972: King Bhumibol Adulyadej granted royal permission for the school to use the "Phra Kiao" emblem, which is worn on the uniform of senior high school students.
- May 17, 1973: Students officially moved to the permanent campus.
- June 24, 1978: A monument to Chao Phraya Bodindecha was unveiled. The opening ceremony was presided over by His Majesty King Vajiralongkorn (then the Crown Prince of Thailand). June 24th is observed as a significant day of remembrance for the school.
- 1986: The Supreme Patriarch of Thailand bestowed the name "Phra Buddhabodin Phithak Boriraksiya" upon the school's main Buddha image.
- 1994: On the school's 25th anniversary, the Chao Phraya Bodindecha (Sing Singhaseni) Museum was established, and Her Royal Highness Princess Maha Chakri Sirindhorn (then The Princess Royal of Thailand) came to perform the opening ceremony on 24 June 1996.

Recent Activities:

- Leading Youth-Led Climate Innovations (UNDP Climate Box Initiative): Integrated UNDP’s interactive Climate Box learning tools into physics classes, empowering students to design real-world sustainability solutions—including the BDS Smart Farm (a solar-powered smart irrigation system) and the BDS Dust Free Zone (an automated solar-powered misting system to combat PM2.5 air pollution on campus).

== Alumni ==
- Wichian Mektrakan: Former Chief Executive Officer (CEO) of Advanced Info Service PCL (AIS)
- Win Lyovarin: National Artist (Literature, 2013), two-time S.E.A. Write Award winner
- Teera Salakphet: Former Minister of Culture
- Prof. Dr. Sirirurg Songsivilai: Former Permanent Secretary of the Ministry of Higher Education, Science, Research and Innovation (MHESI)
- Vicha Poolvaraluck: Founder and Chief Executive Officer (CEO) of Major Cineplex Group PCL
- Police General Damrongsak Kittiprapas: 42nd Commissioner-General of the Royal Thai Police
- Narongsak Osotthanakorn: Former Governor of Chiang Rai, Phayao, Lampang, and Pathum Thani provinces (Director of the Tham Luang cave rescue operation)
- Anucha Nakasai: Former Minister attached to the Office of the Prime Minister
- Nopporn Vuttichart: Chief Executive Officer (CEO) of Siam Future Development PCL
- Admiral Natthaphon Deowanish: Deputy Permanent Secretary of the Ministry of Defence
- Air Chief Marshal Seksan Kantha: 31st Commander-in-Chief of the Royal Thai Air Force
- Suvanant Kongying (Kob): Actress
- Khemupsorn Sirisukha (Cherry): Actress, Environmental Activist
- Worrawech Danuwong (Dan): Member of "D2B", Artist and Director
- Khomkrit Treewimol (Eis): 1 of 6 directors of "Fan Chan (My Girl)" (2003)
- Suthida Kasemsan Na Ayutthaya (Nook): Singer, Actress
- Phagkamon Punyabhuti: Singer and Actress
