= 4Eve =

Thai girl group

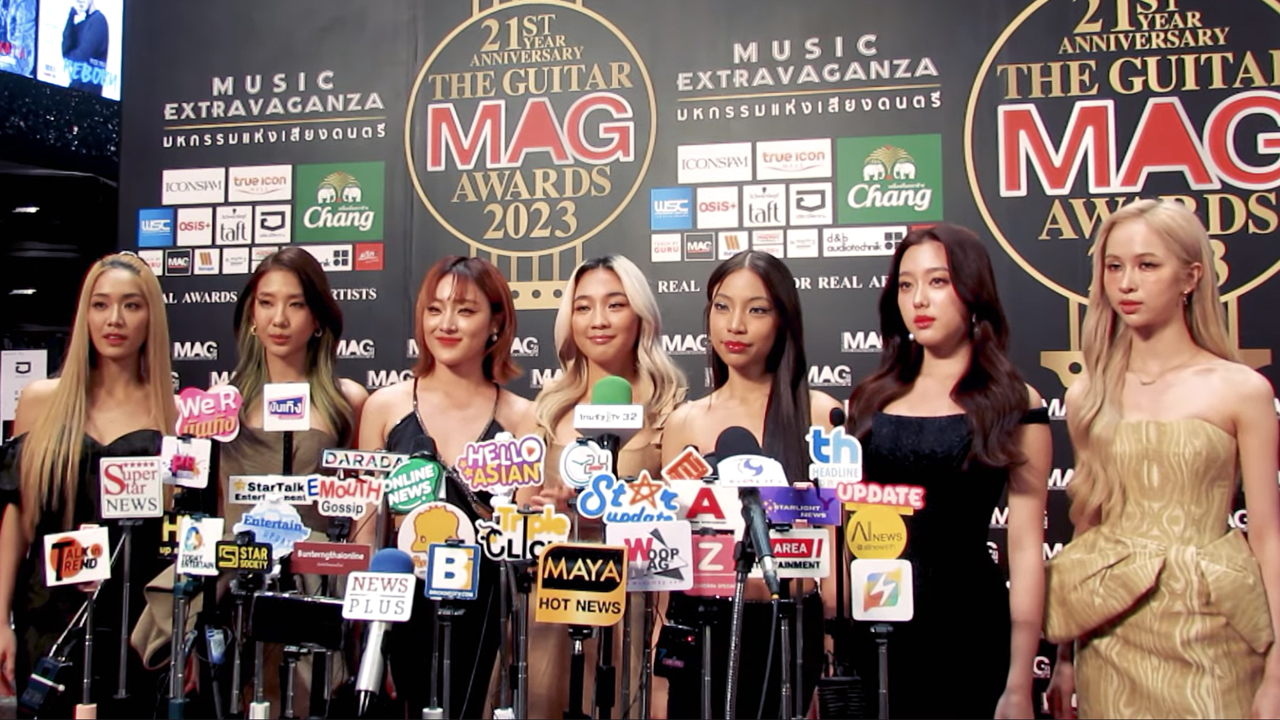
- 4Eve interviewed at the Guitar Mag Awards 2023; Left to right: Mind, Jorin, Punch, Fai, Taaom, Aheye, and Hannah

Background information
- Origin: Bangkok, Thailand
- Genres: T-pop; hip-hop; dance pop
- Years active: 2020–present
- Labels: XOXO; Universal Music Thailand; 88rising
- Members: Atitaya Tribudarak (Mind); Jorin Khumpiraphan (Jorin); Benyapa Unjit (Taaom); Hannah Rosenbloom (Hannah); Nattaya Buttura (Fai); Tipanan Nilsiam (Punch); Korranid Laosubinprasoet (Aheye)
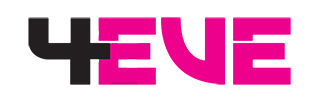

4Eve is a Thai girl group formed in 2020. The group is affiliated with Thai music company Workpoint Entertainment working under their label XOXO Entertainment.

== History ==
The seven members of the group were selected on the survival show Girl Group Star, which aired between July and October 2020. More than 1,000 contestants from Thailand and Laos applied for pre-selection; 20 contestants were selected for participating in the finals. Before debuting, Aheye participated in several auditions for YG Entertainment and was a contestant in the second season of The Voice Kids Thailand. Hannah, who was born in Bangkok but raised in Laos, won second place at Miss Teen Laos and starred in Laotian horror movie The Signal. Punch was a model and gained a following on TikTok.

On December 23, 2020, 4Eve debuted with the release of the single "Ooh La La!". Their name comes from the word "forever" and Eve, meaning "a woman who lives forever." In March 2021 the group released their first album entitled The First Album. The lead single "Test Me" (วัดปะหล่ะ?) managed to peak in the top 10 in the Spotify charts in Thailand. In October of the same year, 4Eve released their first mini album Trick or Treat. About a year later, the release of the second mini album Less is More followed. The group played their first official concert as a two-day event entitled 4Eve The First Concert Family & Friends in December 2022.

In 2024, 4Eve announced their second official concert 4Eve Concert "Now or Never" Live at Impact Arena, whose tickets sold out in minutes. In July 2024, the members performed in Firefly Tales: The Musical. In June 2025, 4Eve released their EP Glow.

== Members ==
- Atitaya Tribudarak (Mind)
- Jorin Khumpiraphan
- Benyapa Unjit (Taaom)
- Hannah Rosenbloom
- Nattaya Buttura (Fai)
- Tipanan Nilsiam (Punch)
- Korranid Laosubinprasoet (Aheye)

== Discography ==
=== Studio albums ===
Title	Details
The First Album	Released: March 28, 2021; Label: XOXO Entertainment; Formats: CD, digital download, streaming, LP; Tracklist: 1. "4EVEr"; 2. "Bomb!"; 3. "Like a Bling"; 4. "No One"; 5. "Test Me" (วัดปะหล่ะ?); 6. "Casual"; 7. "Ooh La La!" (一二三四); 8. "Lookin Lookin" (มองสิ มองสิ); 9. "Our First Day" (วันแรกของวันที่เหลือ)

=== Extended plays ===
Title	Details
Trick or Treat	Released: October 15, 2021; Label: XOXO Entertainment; Formats: CD, digital download, streaming; Tracklist: 1. "Booty Bomb"; 2. "Trick or Treat"; 3. "Reels" (ภาพหลอน); 4. "Nobody's Perfect"
Less is More	Released: December 6, 2022; Label: XOXO Entertainment; Formats: CD, digital download, streaming; Tracklist: 1. "Exceptional" (ข้อยกเว้น); 2. "Boutchya"; 3. "Less is More" (สิ่งเล็กน้อย); 4. "Jackpot"; 5. "Boutchya (Thai Version)"
Glow	Released: June 11, 2025; Label: XOXO Entertainment; Formats: CD, digital download, streaming; Tracklist: 1. "Like You"; 2. "Snooze"; 3. "Keep a Secret"; 4. "Life is a Movie"; 5. "Starry Night"

=== Singles ===
Title	Year	Album
As lead artist
"Lookin Lookin" (มองสิ มองสิ)	2020	The First Album
"Ooh La La!" (一 二 三 四)	2020	The First Album
"Exceptional" (ข้อยกเว้น)	2022	Less is More
"Boutchya"	2022	Less is More
"Boutchya" (Thai Version)	2022	Less is More
"Test Me" (วัดปะหล่ะ?) (All Members Version)	2022	Non-album single
"Less is More" (สิ่งเล็กน้อย)	2022	Less is More
"Jackpot"	2022	Less is More
"Tears" (หยดน้ำตา)	2023	Non-album singles
"Life Boy" (พูดไปก็ไลฟ์บอย)	2023	Non-album singles
"LaLaLook"	2023	Non-album singles
"I Like Boys"	2023	Non-album singles
"Not Kidding" (ไปล้อเล่นไกลๆ)	2023	Non-album singles
"Vroom Vroom"	2023	Non-album singles
"Hot2hot"	2024	Non-album singles
"Wiz You" (อยากมองเธอให้ใกล้กว่านี้)	2024	Non-album singles
"Songkran in Our Country" (สงกรานต์บ้านเรา)	2024	Non-album singles
"Situationship"	2024	Non-album singles
"Let Me Know" (คิดคิด)	2024	Non-album singles
"Guggug feat. Gee" (กักกั๊ก)	2024	Non-album singles
"Glamour Girl feat. Mukta" (ติดแก(ลม))	2024	Non-album singles
"Boys Love Girls"	2024	Non-album singles
"Like You"	2025	Glow
"Woh Oh Oh"	2025	Non-album single
"Snooze"	2025	Glow
"Keep A Secret "	2025	Glow
"Too Perfect For You"	2025	Non-album singles
"Salsa No Drama"	2025	Non-album singles
"Dreaming"	2025	Non-album singles
"Accept The End"	2025	Non-album singles
"Perdsakard"	2025	Non-album singles
"Girls Like Me"	2026	Non-album singles
"My Chainz"	2026	Non-album singles
"Tea"	2026	Non-album singles
Collaborations
"The Mistery of the Universe" (สิ่งลึกลับซับซ้อนในจักรวาล) (4EVE, Atlas, Waii, Jack Jarupong, XOXO trainees)	2021	Non-album single
"Don't Know Me, Don't Know You" (ไม่รู้จักฉันไม่รู้จักเธอ) (Bodyslam, Potato, Clash, Violette Wautier, Bowkylion and 4EVE)	2022	The Gentlemen Live2 Ver.
"Hoo Whee Hoo" (แลกเลยปะ) (Billkin, PP Krit and 4EVE)	2022	Non-album singles
"My Duty" (Jaylerr and 4EVE)	2022	Non-album singles
"Love Mode" (ใจเปิดใจ) (Proxie and 4EVE)	2023	Non-album singles
"Eazy" ("พูดง่ายแต่ทำไม่ง่าย) (Getsunova and 4EVE)	2023	Non-album singles
"Assemble" (4EVE feat. Copter & Thailand Game Show)	2023	Non-album singles
อยากรู้จัก ไม่รู้จบ (Jeff Satur, Jayleer, Thanaerng and 4EVE)	2023	Non-album singles
"Want More Shawty" (มีอีกไหม) (with XOXO artists)	2023	The Test of Time
"Scent-imental Love" (4EVE and Sandy Yanisa)	2023	Non-album singles
"Lucky You" (Ink Waruntorn and 4EVE)	2024	Non-album singles
Soundtrack appearances
"Bring You Down"	2024	Haunted Universities 3 OST
"Smash or Pass"	2024	Out of The Nest OST

== Concerts ==
Title	Date	City	Country	Venue	Attendance	Ref.
4Eve 1st Year Anniversary Meet & Greet	December 23, 2021	Bangkok	Thailand	Lido Connect	—N/a	
4Eve The 1st Concert Friends & Family	December 17, 2022 – December 18, 2022	Bangkok	Thailand	QSNCC	—N/a	
4Eve Concert "Now or Never" Live at Impact Arena	February 10, 2024	Nonthaburi	Thailand	Impact Arena	—N/a	

== Filmography ==
=== Movies ===
Year	Title	Ref.
2024	My Boo (อนงค์)	
2025	The Cliche (คุณชายน์)	

== Awards and nominations ==
Name of the award ceremony, year presented, category, nominee of the award, and the result of the nomination
Award	Year	Category	Nominee/work	Result	Ref.
Fever Awards	2022	Girl Group Fever 2021	4Eve	Won	
Howe Awards	2026	Hottest Artist Award	4Eve	Nominated	
JOOX Thailand Music Awards	2022	Best New Artist	4Eve	Won	
Kazz Awards	2021	Shining Star of The Year	4Eve	Won	
Kazz Awards	2026	Trending Artist Award	4Eve	Nominated	
Komchadluek Awards	2024	Best T-Pop	"Tears"	Won	
Komchadluek Awards	2025	Best T-Pop	"Hot2hot"	Won	
Komchadluek Awards	2025	Most Popular T-Pop	4Eve	Won	
Komchadluek Awards	2026	Most Popular T-Pop	4Eve	Nominated	
Komchadluek Awards	2026	Best Female T-Pop Artist	"Snooze"	Won	
Line Melody Music Awards	2025	Best Group Artist	4Eve	Nominated	
Maya Entertain Awards	2022	Female Artist of the Year	4Eve	Won	
Maya TV Awards	2026	Artist of the Year	4Eve	Nominated	
Nakarat Awards	2023	Most Popular Singer of the Year	4Eve	Won	
Nakarat Awards	2026	Popular Vote	4Eve	Nominated	
NineEntertain Awards	2024	Artist Group of the Year	4Eve	Won	
Sanook Top of the Year Awards	2022	T-Pop Artist of the Year	4Eve	Won	
Sanook Top of the Year Awards	2023	T-Pop Artist of the Year	4Eve	Won	
Sanook Top of the Year Awards	2024	T-Pop Artist of the Year	4Eve	Nominated	
Sanook Top of the Year Awards	2025	Best T-pop Group	4Eve	Nominated	
Siamrath Online Awards	2023	Most Popular Female Idol Group	4Eve	Won	
Thailand Headlines Person of the Year Awards	2024	The Most Popular Thai Girl Group Among Chinese Award	4Eve	Won	
Thailand Social Awards	2023	Best Creator Performance on Social Media (Group)	4Eve	Won	
Thailand Social Awards	2024	Best Creator Performance on Social Media (Boy Band & Girl Group)	4Eve	Won	
Thailand Social Awards	2025	Best Creator Performance on Social Media (Girl Group)	4Eve	Won	
Thailand Social Awards	2026	Best Entertainment Figures Performance on Social Media – Girl Group	4Eve	Won	
The Guitar Mag Awards	2023	Best Group of the Year	4Eve	Won	
The Guitar Mag Awards	2024	Best Girl Group of the Year	4Eve	Won	
The Guitar Mag Awards	2024	Single Hits of the Year	"Tears"	Nominated	
The Guitar Mag Awards	2024	Popular Vote	4Eve	Nominated	
The Guitar Mag Awards	2025	Best Girl Group of the Year	4Eve	Won	
The Guitar Mag Awards	2025	Popular Vote	4Eve	Nominated	
The Guitar Mag Awards	2026	Best Girl Group Of The Year	4Eve	Won	
The Guitar Mag Awards	2026	Best International Song Of The Year	"Keep a Secret"	Nominated	
The Guitar Mag Awards	2026	Popular Vote	4Eve	Nominated	
The People Awards	2026	Popular of the Year	4Eve	Won	
The Viral Hits Awards	2024	Best Female Group Artist of the Year	4Eve	Won	
The Viral Hits Awards	2025	Best Girl Group of the Year	4Eve	Nominated	
TikTok Awards Thailand	2022	Artist of the Year	4Eve	Won	
T-Pop of the Year Music Awards	2021	Best Music of the Year	"Test Me"	Won	
T-Pop of the Year Music Awards	2021	Best Music of the Year (Female Group)	"Test Me"	Won	
T-Pop of the Year Music Awards	2022	Best Music of the Year (Female Group)	"Exceptional"	Won	
T-Pop of the Year Music Awards	2023	Best Music of the Year	"Tears"	Won	
T-Pop of the Year Music Awards	2023	Best Music of the Year (Female Group)	"Tears"	Won	
T-Pop of the Year Music Awards	2024	The Most Popular Female Group of the Year	"Hot2hot"	Won	
T-Pop of the Year Music Awards	2025	Best Pop Artist of the Year	4Eve	Won	
T-Pop of the Year Music Awards	2025	Best Group Artist of the Year	4Eve	Won	
T-Pop of the Year Music Awards	2025	Most Popular Group Performance of the Year	"Keep a Secret"	Won	
T-Pop of the Year Music Awards	2025	Most Popular Female Group of the Year	"Salsa No Drama"	Won	
T-Pop of the Year Music Awards	2025	Best Album of the Year	Glow	Nominated	
T-Pop of the Year Music Awards	2025	Best Album Packaging of the Year	Glow	Nominated	
