= Lingling Kwong =

Thai-Hong Kong actress (born 1995)

Lingling Sirilak Kwong
- หลิงหลิง ศิริลักษณ์ คอง
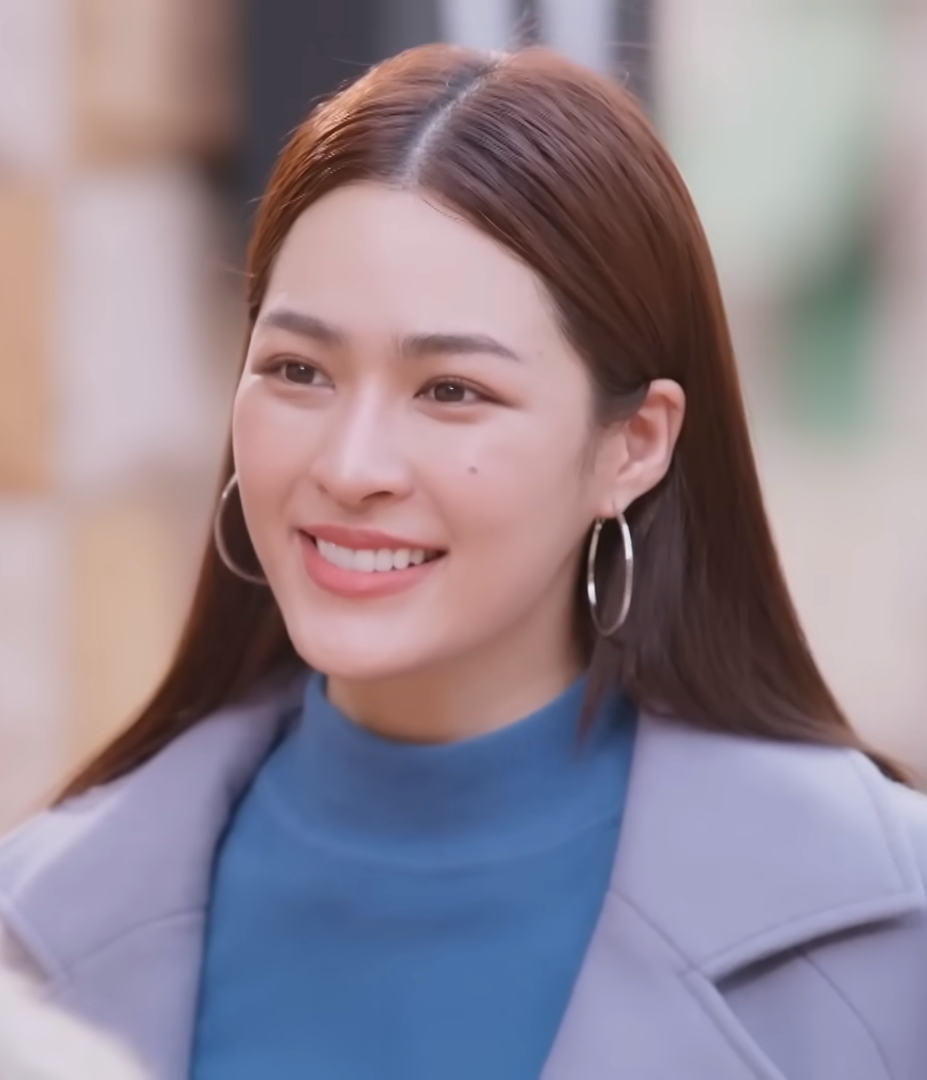
- Kwong in The Secret of Us (2024)
- Born: 11 May 1995 (age 31); Hong Kong
- Other names: Lingling Kwong; Sirilak Kwong
- Education: Khon Kaen University
- Occupation: Actress
- Years active: 2019–present
- Agent: Channel 3 HD (2019–present)
- Notable work: The Secret of Us; Only You; In Love Forever

Chinese name
- Traditional Chinese: 鄺玲玲
- Simplified Chinese: 邝玲玲
Transcriptions
Yue: Cantonese
- Yale Romanization: Kwong Lìhng-lìhng
- Jyutping: Kwong^{3} Ling^{4}-ling^{4-2}
- Sidney Lau: Kwong^{3} Ling^{4}-ling^{4}
- IPA: [kʷʰɔŋ˧ lɪŋ˩ lɪŋ˧˥]

Lingling Sirilak Kwong (Thai: หลิงหลิง ศิริลักษณ์ คอง; Chinese: 鄺玲玲; Jyutping: Kwong^{3} Ling^{4}-ling^{4-2}; born 11 May 1995) is a Thai-Hong Kong actress under Channel 3. She is known for her roles in the sapphic television series The Secret of Us (2024) and Only You (2025).

== Early life and education ==
Kwong was born on 11 May 1995 in British Hong Kong. She was raised in Kwun Tong and attended Mu Kuang English School until 2012. Her father is from Hong Kong and her mother is from Thailand's Kalasin Province. She has a younger brother, who runs a char siu restaurant in Chatuchak, Bangkok. She is a Christian, and can speak Thai, English, Cantonese and Mandarin.

Kwong moved to Thailand at the age of 17. She completed her secondary education at Kalasin Pittayasarn School. She has a bachelor's degree from Khon Kaen University International College, majoring in Tourism Management, with second-class honors.

== Career ==
In 2016, while Kwong was in her junior year of college, she joined the Miss Khon Kaen Silk Contest and won the first runner-up and the Miss Photogenic Award. She then joined the 2018 Miss Khao Suan Kwang Contest and won first runner-up gaining her more attention from the general public. This led to Lingling signing a contract to become an actress under Channel 3.

She debuted with a supporting role in the television series My Forever Sunshine in 2020 starring Mark Prin Suparat and Kao Supassara Thanachat. In 2022, she played her first leading role in the drama Makkali The Love Tree. She also co-hosted the seventh, ninth, and tenth seasons of the Thailand-themed Hong Kong travel program Thai Rogered, produced by TVB, from 2022 to 2024.

She gained wider recognition in 2024 with the sapphic series The Secret of Us opposite Orm Kornnaphat Sethratanapong. The series garnered critical acclaim and won Best GL Series of the Year at the Y Entertain Awards and Most Popular Series award and FEE:D Y Awards. In 2025, Kwong and Kornnaphat reunited to star in Only You.

== Discography ==
=== Singles ===
==== Collaborations ====
Year	Title
2024	"อย่าเล่นกับระบบ" (with Orm Kornnaphat)

==== Soundtrack appearances ====
Year	Title	Album
2024	"สุดท้ายฉันก็เจ็บ"	The Secret of Us OST
2025	"Moonlight"	Only You OST

== Filmography ==
=== Television series ===
Year	Title	Role	Notes	Ref(s).
2020	My Forever Sunshine	Ling	Supporting role	
2022	Makkali The Love Tree	Theerak	Main role	
2023	Royal Doctor	Maenwad	Supporting role	
2023	Love Destiny 2	Jantrawadee	Cameo	
2024	Duangjai Dhevaprom: Jaiphisut	Anthika (Annie)	Supporting role	
2024	Kissed by the Rain	Nicha	Supporting role	
2024	The Secret of Us	Dr. Fahlada Thananusak (Lada)	Main role	
2024	My Cherie Amour	Janthon Udomworakhan / Janthon Worathabhud (Jan)	Supporting role	
2025	Only You	Rawee (Tawan)	Main role	
2025	My Safe Zone	Rawee (Tawan)	Cameo	
2026	Fulfill	Anda	Cameo	
2026	In Love Forever	Runchlaphat Trikittiphum (Runch)	Main role	

=== Variety programs ===
Year	Title	Notes	Ref(s).
2022–2024	Thai Rogered	Host (season 7, 9–10)	

=== Music video appearances ===
Year	Title	Artist	Notes	Ref(s).
2023	"ไม่ได้ทันได้บอกเธอ (Too Late)"	Win Metawin		
2024	"ปฏิเสธไม่ไหว (Crush on You)" (feat. No One Else)	Lipta		
2026	"เก่งไม่พอ Good (Not) Enough"	PP Krit		

== Awards and nominations ==
Award nominations for Lingling Kwong
Year	Award	Category	Nominee(s)	Result	Ref.
2022	Global Star Media Awards 2022	Best Rising Star Female Actor of the Year		Won	
2024	Y Entertain Awards 2024	Princess of Girls' Love		Won	
2024	Howe Awards 2024	Top 50 Influential People 2024		Won	
2024	Maya TV Awards 2024	Charming Female of the Year		Won	
2024	Sanook Top of the Year 2024	Rising Star 2024		Won	
2025	Kazz Awards 2025	Sao Wai Sai 2024 (1st place)		Won	
2025	Howe Awards 2025	Hottest Actress of the Year		Won	
2025	Kom Chad Luek Awards 2025	Most Popular Actress of the Year		Won	
2025	Weibo Gala – Weibo Cultural Exchange Night 2025	Thailand Most Trending Artist		Won	
2025	Weibo	Weibo Overseas Star 2025		Won	
2025	Sanook Top of the Year 2025	Most Popular Young Icon of 2025		Won	
2025	Thailand Box Office 2024	Best Actress of the Year (Series)	The Secret of Us	Won	
2025	Thailand Box Office 2024	Couple of the Year	with Kornnaphat Sethratanapong	Won	
2025	Sanook Top of the Year 2024	Rising Star of the Year		Won	
2025	16th Nataraja Awards	Best Actress		Nominated	
2026	ContentAsia Awards 2026	Viewers' Choice: Favourite Actress		Gold	
2026	Y Entertain Awards 2026	Y Couple of the Year	with Kornnaphat Sethratanapong	Nominated	
2026	Feed x Khaosod Awards 2026	Best Chemistry of the Year	with Kornnaphat Sethratanapong	Nominated	
2026	Feed x Khaosod Awards 2026	Best Chemistry (Popular Vote)	with Kornnaphat Sethratanapong	Nominated	
2026	Feed x Khaosod Awards 2026	Most Popular Actress (Popular Vote)		Nominated	
