= Kornnaphat Sethratanapong =

Thai actress (born 2002)

- กรณ์นภัส เศรษฐรัตนพงศ์
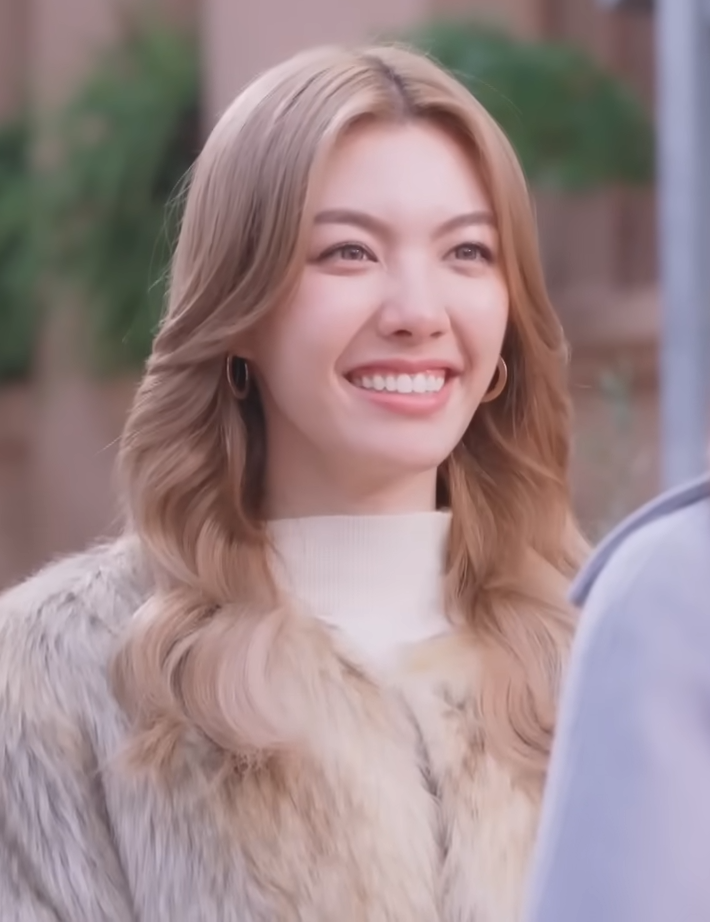
- Kornnaphat in 2024
- Born: 27 May 2002 (age 24)
- Other name: Orm Sethratanapong (Thai: ออม เศรษฐรัตนพงศ์)
- Citizenship: Thailand
- Occupations: Actress, entrepreneur
- Years active: 2019–present
- Agent: Channel 3 HD (2019–present)
- Notable work: The Secret of Us; Only You; In Love Forever

Kornnaphat Sethratanapong (Thai: กรณ์นภัส เศรษฐรัตนพงศ์; born 27 May 2002), nicknamed Orm (Thai: ออม), is a Thai actress. She is known for her roles in the sapphic television series The Secret of Us (2024) , Only You (2025) and In Love Forever (2026). Aside from acting, she also founded the fashion label Keep Silent which specializes in comfort-oriented clothing.

== Early life and education ==
Kornnaphat Setharatanapong, formerly known as Norawan Setharatanapong, was born on 27 May 2002 in Bangkok, Thailand. She is the eldest daughter of actress Naruemon Phongsuphap, known by her nickname Koy, and has a younger brother. Her family owns Sethachon Corporation, a company specializing in the export of frozen food.

Kornnaphat attended Wattana Wittaya Academy, Panyarat School, and Srinakharinwirot University Prasarnmit Demonstration School, where she studied in the English–ASEAN programme.

She graduated from Srinakharinwirot University in 2024 with a bachelor's degree in Economics through its international programme. She subsequently received a scholarship to pursue a master's degree at the university's College of Social Communication Innovation, majoring in Social Media for Society.

== Career ==
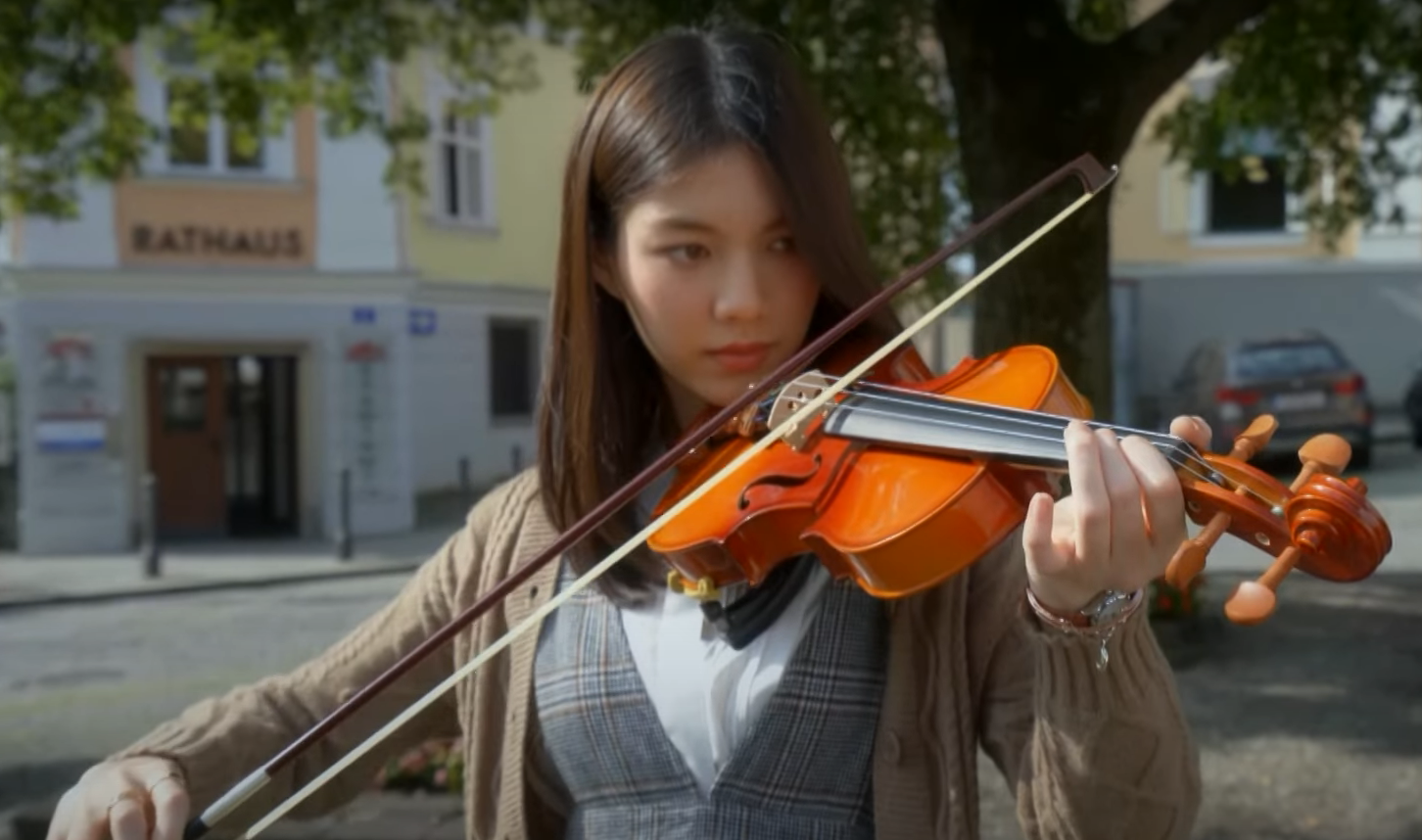
Kornnaphat in 2023

Kornnaphat began her acting career in 2019 with the youth series Hotel Stars. She signed with Channel 3 in 2020. She subsequently appeared in several Channel 3 television productions, including Praomook (2021), Game of Outlaws (2021), From Zero to Hero (2021) and Eclipse of the Heart (2023).

In 2024, Kornnaphat had her breakthrough role as Sanithada Phongphiphat (Earn) in the sapphic series The Secret of Us, opposite Lingling Kwong. The series received critical acclaim and brought Kornnaphat wider international recognition. She received the Leading Girl's Love Star of the Year award at the Y Entertain Awards 2024, while The Secret of Us was named Best GL Series of the Year. The series also won the Most Popular Series award at the FEED Y Awards.

In 2025, Kornnaphat and Lingling reunited to star in Only You, playing Sasina Ruengkhunakhon (Ayla).

In 2026, Kornnaphat starred opposite Lingling Kwong as Peeracha Phacharathakun (Neen) in In Love Forever.

Aside from acting, Kornnaphat founded her own fashion label, Keep Silent. With the slogan, "In a world full of noise, you keep: silent", the company sells a variety of comfort-core items.

She is also the CEO and business owner behind OMU & CO., a nutrition and lifestyle brand focused on protein and everyday nutrition. Its products include clear protein drinks, protein soup, and a range of sauces, including truffle-flavoured and smoked-flavoured seasoning sauces.

== Filmography ==
=== Film ===
Year	Title	Role	Notes	Ref.
2019	Schizophrenia	Pim's imaginary friend		
2023	Still Love	Herself		
2024	3 A.M.	Dao		
2025	Will You Marry Monk?	Aom	Feature film debut	

=== Television series ===
Year	Title	Role	Notes	Ref.
2019	Hotel Stars	Nook		
2021	Praomook	Treenuch “Nuch”	Cameo	
2021	I See Dead People	Jan	Guest	
2021	Game of Outlaws	Anya Ruangsuradecha		
2021	From Zero to Hero	Prima Wiralkul (Prim)		
2022	Aye, Khoi Huk Jao	Thanya		
2023	Nakak	Phin		
2023	Tai Ngao Tawan	Victoria Alexander (Vicky)		
2023	To the Moon and Back (*Matalada*)	Siriphon (Riri)		
2023	Eclipse of the Heart	Victoria Alexander (Vicky)	Guest	
2023	Nobody's Happy If I'm Not	Dawan Siriwet / Krairit (Wan)		
2024	Duang Jai Tewaprom: Laorchan	Kanthika Juthathep (Kan)		
2024	The Secret of Us	Sanithada Phongphiphat (Earn)		
2025	Only You	Sasina Ruengkhunakhon (Ayla)		
2025	My Safe Zone	Sasina Ruengkhunakhon (Ayla)		
2026	In Love Forever	Peeracha (Neen)		
TBA	Kep Phaen Din	Manu		

=== Music video appearances ===
Year	Title	Artist	Nominated work	Ref.
2022	"I Have No Black Magic"	Singto Numchok		
2025	"Forever"	Nunew		

== Awards and nominations ==
Award nominations for Kornnaphat Sethratanapong
Year	Award	Category	Nominee(s)	Result	Ref.
2024	Y Entertain Awards	Leading Girls' Love Star of the Year		Won	
2025	Kazz Awards	Most Popular Young Girl Award		Won	
2025	Thailand Box Office 2024	Couple of the Year	with Lingling Kwong	Won	
2026	ContentAsia Awards 2026	Viewers' Choice: Favourite Actress		Gold	
2026	Y Entertain Awards 2026	Best Series OST of the Year	"ระยะไกลของดวงจันทร์"	Nominated	
2026	Y Entertain Awards 2026	Y Couple of the Year	with Lingling Kwong	Nominated	
2026	Mint Awards 2026	Best Cover of the Year	Mint Vol. 34	Won	
2026	Feed x Khaosod Awards 2026	Best Chemistry of the Year	with Lingling Kwong	Nominated	
2026	Feed x Khaosod Awards 2026	Girls' Love Actress of the Year	Only You	Won	
2026	Feed x Khaosod Awards 2026	Best Chemistry (Popular Vote)	with Lingling Kwong	Nominated	
