= Devil-in-Law =

2023 Thai television soap opera

- Also known as: Wicked-in-Law; Sapai Sai Strong; Strong Daughter-in-Law
- Original title: สะใภ้สายสตรอง
- Created by: Nantana Weerachon
- Written by: Nantana Weerachon
- Screenplay by: Sotisa Wongyu
- Directed by: Aun Kornpoj Suebchompoo
- Starring: Butsakorn Wongpuapan; Nawasch Phupantachsee; Nuttanicha Dungwattanawanich
- Country of origin: Thailand
- Original language: Thai
- No. of episodes: 17

Production
- Producer: Somching Srisupap
- Production location: Thailand
- Running time: 60–68 minutes
- Production companies: BEC World; Good Feeling

Original release
- Network: Channel 3
- Release: January 23 – March 20, 2023

Devil-in-Law (Thai: สะใภ้สายสตรองRTGS: Sapai Sai Strong) is a Thai television series premiered on January 23, 2023, and last aired on March 20, 2023, on Channel 3. It starred Butsakorn Wongpuapan, Nawasch Phupantachsee and Nuttanicha Dungwattanawanich and produced by King Somching Srisupap.

== Plot ==
A woman named Phawinee, after suffering the mistreatment and subsequent death of her sister Srikanda due to abuse from her in-laws, chooses to marry her sister's husband, Nopphanai, as an act of vengeance. She moves into the family residence with the intention of methodically breaking down their lives from the inside, all while playing the role of an exemplary wife and daughter-in-law.

== Cast ==
=== Main ===
- Nuttanicha Dungwattanawanich as Phawinee
- Nawasch Phupantachsee as Nopphanai
- Butsakorn Wongpuapan as Nuan

=== Supporting ===
- Pitchapa Phanthumchinda as Netdao
- Paswitch Boorananut as Try
- Thakoon Karntip as Thomthawi
- Lorena Schuett as Lalita
- Chatayodom Hiranyatithi as Singkhorn
- Amarin Nitibhon as Phanit
- Paweena Charivsakul as Orn
- Fundee Junyatanakron as Tom
- Runglawan Thonahongsa as Jai
- Nanthasai Visalyaputra as Tin
- Athichanan Srisevok as Srikanda
- Sippothai Chanthasiriwat as Joy
- Danaya Ratanatada as Somphit
- Penpetch Benyakul as Krit
- Danai Charuchinta as Adisorn

== Production ==
Principal photography commenced in April 2022.

May 11, 2022, media conference was held at Channel 3 Studio in Nong Khaem, it was led by Somjing Srisuphap as the producer of this drama.

== In other media ==
International Broadcast

Country	Network	Title	Date
Philippines	GMA	Wicked-in-Law	February 3, to April 16, 2025, Re-runs September 8, 2025 to November 1, 2025
(Various Countries)	Viu	Devil-in-Law/Strong Daughter-in-Law	January 23, 2023
