= Gaewalin Sriwanna =

Thai actress

- เกวลิน ศรีวรรณา
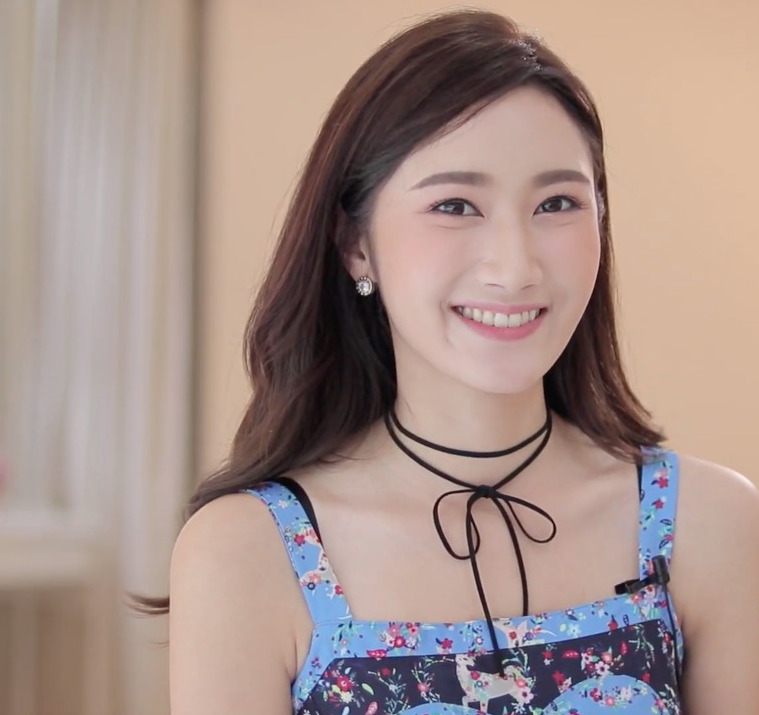
- Gaewalin in 2018
- Born: Gaewalin Sriwanna; February 12, 1992 (age 34); Bangkok, Thailand
- Other name: Jean (ยีน)
- Occupation: Actress
- Years active: 2012–present
- Notable work: Mongkut Rissaya; Jai Luang

Gaewalin Sriwanna (เกวลิน ศรีวรรณา, RTGS: Kewalin Siwanna; born 12 February 1992), nicknamed Jean (ยีน), is a Thai actress who was third runner-up in Miss Universe Thailand 2012.

== Early life and education ==
Gaewalin was bron and raised in Bangkok, Thailand. She had graduated from Rangsit University majoring in Fine Arts.

== Filmography ==
Year	Title	Role	Network	Ref.
2013	Mr Baan Na	Kate/Cat	Channel 3 Thailand	
2014	Thida Dance	Fon Luang	Channel 3 Thailand	
2015	Mongkut Rissaya	Chompoo	Channel 8 (Thailand)	
2016	Sapai Rod Saap	Mew		
2016	Krathin Rim Rua	Krathin		
2017	Jai Luang/Lying Heart	Raveet		
2018	Por Pla Lai	Aim		
2019	Winyarn Pitsawong	Naet		
2019	Manee Naka	Manee Naet Nakee		
2022	Matcha Anda	Anda		
2022	Sisa Marn	Wilari		
