= Siam Future Development =

Siam Future Development PCL (SET: SF) is a real-estate development company based in Bangkok, Thailand. Its business is focused on the development and management of shopping malls, especially open-air malls in the community centre category. Its properties include the Esplanade shopping mall, as well as several community and neighbourhood malls under The Avenue and Market Place brands, mostly in Bangkok. It also jointly owns and manages Mega Bangna, a super-regional mall in Samut Prakan Province. The company was established in 1994, and was listed on the Stock Exchange of Thailand in 2002, with an authorized capital of 1.480 billion baht.

In 2021, Central Pattana acquired a majority 30 percent stake in Siam Future, previously held by Major Cineplex Group.
