= Nisachon Tuamsoongnuen =

Thai actress and model

- นิศาชล ต้วมสูงเนิน
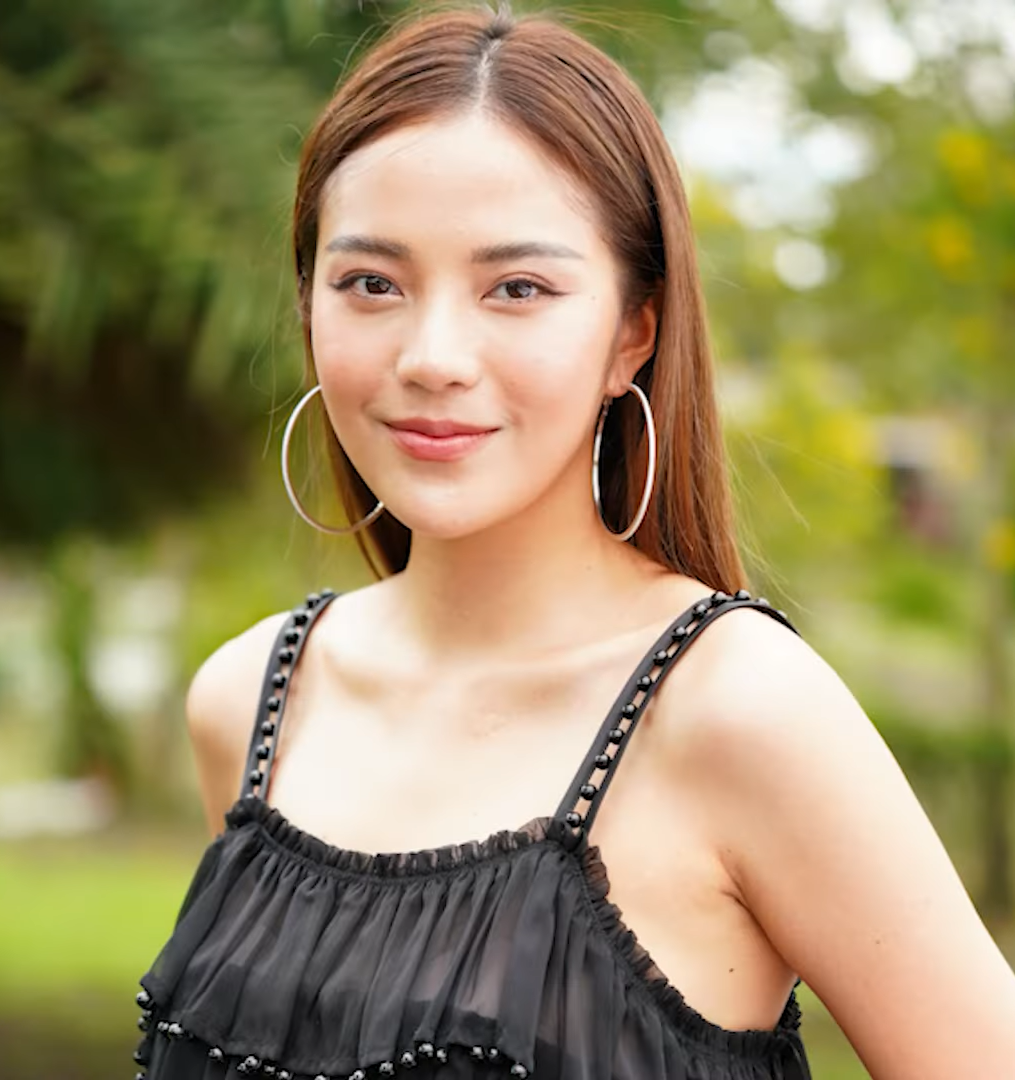
- Tuamsoongnuen in November 2022
- Born: 24 April 1993 (age 33); Udon Thani, Thailand
- Other name: May (เม ต้วมสูงเนิน)
- Height: 1.66 m (5 ft 5 1/2 in)
- Beauty pageant titleholder
- Agency: Channel 3 (2014–present)
- Years active: 2013–present
- Hair color: Black
- Eye color: Black
- Major competitions: Miss Thailand World 2013 (Special Award)

Nisachon Tuamsoongnuen (Thai: นิศาชล ต้วมสูงเนิน; born 24 April 1993), nicknamed May (Thai: เม), is a Thai actress known for her roles in the television series Krong Kam (2014), Mia Archeep (2020), and Only You (2025).

== Early life and education ==
Tuamsoongnuen was born on 24 April 1993 in Udon Thani, Thailand. She graduated secondary school at St. Mary's School, and studied at the Faculty of Communication Arts of Rangsit University.

== Career ==
In 2013, Tuamsoongnuen competed in Miss Thailand World and won one of the special awards. The following year, she signed on as an actress with Channel 3. She debuted in the television series Khun Chai Ruk Leh (2014) and gained attention with her role in the drama Krong Kam in 2015.

== Filmography ==
=== Film ===
Year	Title	Role	Notes	Ref.
2014	Vengeance of An Assassins	Ploy	Support Role	

=== Television Lakorn ===
Year	Title	Role	Network	Notes	Ref.
2014	Khun Chai Ruk Leh	Pangra / Pang	Channel 3		
2014	Thida Dance	Chombongkot (Bua)	Channel 3		
2015	Thephabutra Sud Waeha	Rtirs	Channel 3		
2016	Saeng Tian	Plengpin / Pleng	Channel 3		
2017	Paen Rai Long Tai Wa Rak	Fah	Channel 3		
2017	Por Yung Lung Mai Wahng	Lookwat	Channel 3		
2019	Gon Luang Tuang Nee Rak	Sareeya / "Wan"	Channel 3		
2019	Krong Kam	Bang-on	Channel 3		
2019	Plerng Prang Tian	Pam / Paika	Channel 3		
2019	Daai Daeng	Mei Fang / Wiwan Lilu Rattana (Mahamongkol)	Channel 3		
2020	Mia Archeep	Anna	Channel 3		
2021	Maya Sanaeha	Tunlaya (Tun)	Channel 3		
2021	Karat Ruk	Nita (Ta)	Channel 3		
2022	Sorn Klin	Mr. Ken's wife	Channel 3	Cameo	
2022	Mat Huajai Yai Sup Tar	Plai-Fah	Channel 3		
2024	Ruean That	Kloi	Channel 3		
2024	Wao Won Rak	Wanjai	Channel 3		
2024	Nai Wan Thi Fon Phrang Phrai	Phraephan	Channel 3		
2024	Nueng Nai Roi	Urai	Channel 3	Cameo	
2025	Saen Rak	Chomchawi (Chom)	Channel 3		
2025	Only You	Chanya "Yaa" Nanwichai	Channel 3		
2026	Yiwa Datang	Duean	Channel 3		
2026	Thatri	Srijan Podpreeda (Sri)	Channel 3		
2026	Keb Pandin (2026)	Khengla	Channel 3		

=== Television series ===
Year	Title	Role	Network	Notes	Ref.
2025	Only You	Chanya Nanwichai (Yaa)	Channel 3		
2026	Your Dear Daddy	Phon	Channel 9		

== Discography ==
- 2014 (ทิ้งกันละน่าดู) - Thida Dance (ธิดาแดนซ์)
