= Viphada Jatuyosporn =

Thai voice actress and copywriter

- วิภาดา จตุยศพร
- Born: 8 October 1957 (age 68); Thailand
- Years active: 1980s–present
- Notable work: Sailor Moon series as Usagi Tsukino; Detective Conan series as Ran Mouri, Ai Haibara, Miwako Sato; One Piece as Nami

Viphada Jatuyosporn (Thai: วิภาดา จตุยศพร; RTGS: Wiphada Chatuyotsaphon; born 8 October 1957) is a Thai voice actress.

== Career ==
Throughout her life, she has been affiliated with Channel 9 (MCOT HD), as well as with TIGA and Dream Express (DEX), where she has worked on numerous Thai-dubbed anime. Before she started voice acting, Viphada worked as a copywriter and newsreader in the 1980s. She also worked as director and TV producer for Channel 9. Viphada's first major role was as the Thai-dubbed version of Usagi Tsukino in Sailor Moon, which aired on Channel 9 in the 1990s. Some of her major roles include Ran Mouri, Ai Haibara, and Miwako Sato in the Detective Conan series, Nami in the One Piece series, Ryoma Echizen in The Prince of Tennis series, and Kagome Higurashi in InuYasha.

== Filmography ==
=== Voice over roles ===
==== Anime ====
- Goldfish Warning! (Channel 9 dub) – Wapiko
- Dragon Quest: Dai no Daibōken (Channel 9 dub) – Maam
- Cobra (Channel 9 dub) – Catherine Royal, Dominique Royal
- Idol Tenshi Youkoso Yōko (Channel 9 dub)– Saki
- Ranma ½ (Channel 9 dub) – Tendo Akane, Tendo Nabiki
- Sailor Moon – Usagi Tsukino, Kaioh Michiru
- Hunter × Hunter (Channel 9 dub) – Killua Zoldyck
- Inuyasha – Higurashi Kagome, Kikyo, Kohaku
- Ojamajo Doremi (Channel 9 dub) – Aiko Senō, Onpu Segawa
- Glass Mask (Channel 9 dub) – Chigusa Tsukikage
- Rockman EXE – Rockman
- Mirmo! (Channel 9 dub) – Mirumo
- The Prince of Tennis – Ryoma Echizen, Sumire Ryuzaki
- Tokyo Mew Mew (Channel 9 dub) – Mint Aizawa
- You're Under Arrest! (Channel 9 dub) – Aoi Futaba
- Digimon Adventure (Channel 9 dub) – Sora Takenouchi, Agumon, Wizardmon
- Digimon Adventure 02 (Channel 9 dub) – Motomiya Daisuke, Wormmon
- Digimon Savers (Channel 9 dub) – Agumon, Relena Norstein, Noguchi Misuzu
- Inazuma Eleven (Channel 9 dub) – Natsumi Raimon, Kakeru Megane
- Futari wa Pretty Cure v – Nagisa Misumi
- Shonen Onmyouji v – Abe no Masahiro
- Futari wa Pretty Cure Splash Star (Channel 9 dub) – Saki Hyuuga
- Bakugan Battle Brawlers (Channel 9 dub) – Runo Misaki
- Bakugan New Vestroia (Channel 9 dub) – Mira Clay, Runo Misaki
- Beet the Vandel Buster (Channel 9 dub) – Poala
- Beyblade: Metal Fusion (Channel 9 dub) – Madoka Amano
- Fairy Tail (Channel 9 dub) – Lucy Heartfilia
- Battle Spirits: Shounen Toppa Bashin (Channel 9 dub) – J (Juri Sawaragi)
- Neon Genesis Evangelion – Rei Ayanami, Misato Katsuragi
- Sailor Moon – Usagi Tsukino, Kaioh Michiru
- Detective Conan – Mouri Ran, Haibara Ai, Sato Miwako
- High School of the Dead – Rei Miyamoto
- Tokyo Mew Mew – Zakuro Fujiwara, Mint Aizawa
- Hellsing – Integra Hellsing
- Girls und Panzer – Miho Nishizumi
- Burst Angel – Megumi (Meg)
- Blue Dragon – Shu
- Moeyo Ken – Yuko Kondo
- Love Hina – Mutsumi Otohime, Kaolla Su
- Hikaru no Go – Shindo Hikaru
- Godannar – Anna Aoi/Saruwatari
- Nadia: The Secret of Blue Water – Nadia
- The King of Braves GaoGaiGar – Mikoto Utsugi
- Inuyasha – Higurashi Kagome, Kohaku
- Kannazuki no Miko – Himeko Kurusugawa, Nekoko
- Beyblade – Ray Kon, Kyouju
- D.N. Angel – Harada Riku
- City Hunter – Makimura Kaori
- Clamp School Detectives – Nokoru Imonoyama
- Oh My Goddess! – Skuld
- The Mythical Detective Loki Ragnarok – Loki
- Azumanga Daioh – Chiyo Mihama, Sakaki
- Full Metal Panic! – Kaname Chidori
- Great Teacher Onizuka – Azusa Fuyutsuki, Aizawa Miyabi
- Mobile Suit Gundam SEED – Lacus Clyne, Murrue Ramius
- Mobile Suit Gundam SEED Destiny – Lacus Clyne, Murrue Ramius, Meer Campbell, Stella Loussier, Meyrin Hawke
- Mobile Suit Gundam: The 08th MS Team – Aina Sahalin, Kiki Rosita
- Mobile Suit Gundam 00 – Christina Sierra
- Tenjho Tenge – Maya Natsume
- Fruits Basket – Yuki Sohma, Saki Hanajima
- Dragon Ball – Bulma, Krillin
- Dragon Ball Z – Chi Chi, Son Gohan
- Dragon Ball GT – Young Son Goku
- Fullmetal Alchemist – Winry Rockbell, Young Edward Elric
- Fafner in the Azure – Tomi Maya
- Midori Days – Takako Ayase
- Zatch Bell! – Sherry Belmont, Megumi Oumi, Kanchomé
- Yakitate!! Japan – Kazuma Azuma, Azusagawa Yukino
- Gintama – Kagura (Season 1)
- Detective School Q – Kyū Renjō
- Negima! Magister Negi Magi – Asuna Kagurazaka
- Magical Girl Lyrical Nanoha – Fate Testarossa
- Magical Girl Lyrical Nanoha A's – Fate Testarossa, Shamal
- Magical Girl Lyrical Nanoha StrikerS – Fate Testarossa, Shamal, Subaru Nakajima
- My-HiME – Tokiha Mai, Shizuru Fujino, Akira Okuzaki
- My-Otome – Arika Yumemiya, Shizuru Viola
- Fate/stay night – Saber, Taiga Fujimura
- Anpanman – Anpanman
- Tiger & Bunny – Karina Lyle
- Eureka Seven – Eureka, Hilda
- xxxHolic – Yūko Ichihara
- Cardcaptor Sakura – Shaoran Li, Tomoyo Daidouji
- Kiddy Grade – Éclair
- Yu-Gi-Oh! Duel Monsters – Anzu Mazaki
- Saint Seiya – Saori Kido, Eagle Marin
- Ultimate Muscle – Rinko Nikaidō, Bibinba Kinniku (Mantaro's Mother)
- Shin Mazinger Shougeki! Z Hen – Sayaka Yumi, Tsubasa Nishikiori, Gamia Q
- Shaman King – Asakura Yoh, Kyoyama Anna
- Digimon Tamers – Makino Ruki, Guilmon
- Digimon Frontier – Orimoto Izumi, Fairymon
- Digimon Savers – Agumon, Yoshi Fujieda
- Ouran High School Host Club – Fujioka Haruhi
- Hell Girl – Enma Ai
- School Rumble – Sawachika Eri, Tsukamoto Yakumo
- Shakugan no Shana – Shana (Season 1)
- Gurren Lagann – Yoko Littner
- Code Geass – C.C., Shirley Fenette, Euphemia li Britannia, Villetta Nu, Inoue, Jiang Lihua, Monica Kruszewski, Guinevere su Britannia
- One Piece – Nami
- Toradora! – Kushieda Minori, Kawashima Ami, Takasu Yasuko
- Eden of the East – Saki Morimi
- Cyborg Kuro-chan - Kuro

==== Tokusatsu dubbing ====
- Battle Fever J – Diane Martin, María Nagisa
- Denshi Sentai Denziman – Akira Momoi
- Chikyuu Sentai Fiveman – Kazumi Hoshikawa
- Chōjin Sentai Jetman – Ako Hayasaka
- Kyōryū Sentai Zyuranger – Boi
- Gosei Sentai Dairanger – Lin (Hououranger)
- Chouriki Sentai Ohranger – Momo Marou (Oh Pink)
- Mirai Sentai Timeranger – Lila
- GoGo Sentai Boukenger – Sakura Nishihori (Bouken Pink)
- Juken Sentai Gekiranger – Ran Uzaki
- Kamen Rider Kuuga – Sakurako Sawatari
- Kamen Rider Agito – Mana Kazaya, Risa Fukami
- Kamen Rider Ryuki – Miho Kirishima
- Kamen Rider 555 – Mari Sonoda, Saeko Kageyama
- Kamen Rider Blade – Shiori Hirose
- Kamen Rider Hibiki – Hinaka Tachibana
- Kamen Rider Kabuto – Hiyori Kusakabe, Yuzuki Misaki, Renge Takatori
- Kamen Rider Den-O – Naomi, Airi Nogami
- Ultraman Max – Mizuki Koishikawa, Yukari Yoshinaga
- Ultraman Mebius – Marina Kazama, Yuki Misaki
- K-tai Investigator 7 – Chigusa Mimasaka

==== TV program dubbing ====
- Kasou Taishou
- Beyond Tomorrow
