= Kratai R-Siam =

Thai singer, model and boxer

- กระต่าย อาร์สยาม
- Born: Thikaporn Bunyalieang; 4 June 1989 (age 37); Lampang, Thailand
- Other name: Kratai R-Siam Thai: กระต่าย อาร์ สยาม
- Occupations: Singer; model; boxer; businesswoman; television personality
- Years active: 2008–present
- Musical career
- Genres: Thai-pop; luk thung; dance
- Label: R-Siam
- Website: Instagram

Thikaporn Bunyalieang born 4 June 1989, better known by the stage name Kratai R-Siam (Thai: กระต่าย อาร์ สยาม), is a Thai luk thung singer under the R-Siam label. She also has a background in Muay Thai and adheres to Hinduism.

== Education ==
She graduated in Bachelor of Architecture from Sri Pathum University.

== Career ==
Kratay is well known for her prowess as a Muay Thai boxer and a pop singer. Her style is Lanna which is northern Thai and is different from more traditional Isaarn luuk thoong style. She has recorded and released several albums including best albums (compilation) on the Rsiam label. She is primarily successful in Asian countries (especially Thailand, Cambodia, Japan, China and Taiwan), but she has also performed in Belgium and France.

== Discography ==
=== Tee Kao Kayao Dance ===
This album is a cooperation of Kratae and Kratay, a sister of Kratae and was released on 27 January 2010. The ten songs on this album are:-

1. "Yarng nee tong tee kao" (อย่างนี้ต้องตีเข่า)
2. "Dek pump" (เด็กปั๊ม)
3. "Sao rum wong" (สาวรำวง)
4. "Pok mia ma duay" (พกเมียมาด้วย)
5. "Chorp mai" (ชอบมั้ย)
6. "Ruk rua lom" (รักเรือล่ม)
7. "Mai yark pen praeng see fun" (ไม่อยากเป็นแปรงสีฟัน)
8. "Tob mue karng deaw" (ตบมือข้างเดียว)
9. "Ma ruk tum mai torn nee" (มารักทำไมตอนนี้)
10. "Warng laew chuay tro glub" (ว่างแล้วช่วยโทรกลับ)

== Singles ==
- "เมรี (Meri)" feat.Kratae Rsiam (24 December 2014)

== Movies ==
- Look Tung Nguen Laan (2013)

== Dramas ==
- Rachanee Look Toong (Ch.8 2012)
- Like Mat Sang (Ch.8 2015)
