= The Secret of Us (TV series) =

2024 Thai television series

- Promotional poster
- ใจซ่อนรัก
- Genre: Drama; Girls' love
- Based on: Jai Son Rak (ใจซ่อนรัก) by Meenam (มีนาม)
- Written by: Jaotarn Piyaporn Wayuparp; Tinna Simapaisal; Nitinun Supappong
- Directed by: Saratswadee Wongsomphet
- Starring: Kornnaphat Sethratanapong; Lingling Kwong
- Country of origin: Thailand
- Original language: Thai
- No. of episodes: 8

Production
- Producer: Piyawadee Maleenont
- Cinematography: Ruengwit Ramasoota
- Running time: 48–51 minutes
- Production company: Channel 3

Original release
- Network: Channel 3; YouTube; Netflix
- Release: 24 June – 12 August 2024

The Secret of Us (Thai: ใจซ่อนรัก; RTGS: Chai Son Rak; lit. 'Heart Hides Love') is a 2024 Thai drama-girls' love television series, adapted from the novel of the same name by Meenam (Thai: มีนาม), starring Kornnaphat Sethratanapong (Orm) and Lingling Kwong. Directed by Saratswadee Wongsomphet, and produced by Channel 3, it premiered on the network on 24 June 2024 until 12 August 2024 for eight episodes. It is the first girls' love series produced by Channel 3.

== Synopsis ==
The series follows Fahlada (Lingling Kwong), a dermatologist working at a hospital owned by her family. Before starting her career Fahlada had studied abroad where she met and fell in love with Earn (Kornnaphat Sethratanapong). The pair were together for three years before Earn abruptly ended the relationship without telling Fahlada the true reason why. Heartbroken, Fahlada tried to move on with her life, finishing medical school and returning to Thailand to help run the hospital. However when she meets Earn again by chance two years later, Earn wants to get back together and prove she loves Falada and can do their relationship right this time. Falada resists, wanting nothing to do with Earn, but her feelings are reignited. Eventually, the real reason Earn broke off their affair and ran away comes out.

== Cast ==
=== Main ===
- Kornnaphat Sethratanapong as "Earn" Sanithada Phongphiphat
- Lingling Kwong as Fahlada Thananusak

=== Supporting ===
- Chatsak Mahata as Susi
- Jakarin Puribhat as Thaen
- Natthanit Praditthan as Wisanu
- Dandao Yamapai as Bow
- Anada Prakobkit as Engfa
- Naruemon Phongsupap as Jintana Phongphiphat
- Paramej Noiam as Phuthares Thananusak
- Apasiri Nitibhon as Russamee Thananusak
- Sureeyares Yakares as Rati
- Nene Thanchanok Yutthasarnsiri as "Ros" Rossarin

== Production ==
On 14 February 2024, Channel 3 released a mini pilot on their official YouTube channel. The full pilot was released on 2 April 2024, which was well-received by viewers. The series began airing every 10pm on 24 June 2024. A goodwill ceremony was held at the Channel 3 studios prior to the premiere.

== Reception ==
=== Critical response ===
Frank Hecker, a staff writer at Okazu, gave the series an overall 7 out of 10, finding that while the actresses gave great performances the script itself was lacking, "unfortunately, the relatively weak scriptwriting in The Secret of Us often puts otherwise compelling characters into situations that don’t make sense given the context, as with some of Earn’s more forward attempts to win Fahlada back. Lingling and Orm deserve a better vehicle for their considerable talents."

=== Viewership ===
In the table below, the blue number represents the lowest ratings and the red number represents the highest ratings.

Episode No.	Air date	Timeslot (UTC+07:00)	Average audience share	Source
1	24 June 2024	Monday 一 22:00	0.921	
2	1 July 2024	Monday 一 22:00	0.809	
3	8 July 2024	Monday 一 22:00	0.583	
4	15 July 2024	Monday 一 22:00	0.532	
5	22 July 2024	Monday 一 22:00	0.7	
6	29 July 2024	Monday 一 22:00	0.535	
7	5 August 2024	Monday 一 22:00	0.647	
8	12 August 2024	Monday 一 22:00	0.59	
Average			0.67	^{1}

^1 Based on the average audience share per episode.

== Awards and nominations ==
Year	Award	Category	Nominee(s)	Result	Ref.
2024	HUB Awards 2024	Masterpiece of the Year	Kornnaphat Sethratanapong and Lingling Kwong	Won	
2024	HUB Awards 2024	Series of the Year	The Secret of Us	Nominated	
2024	HUB Awards 2024	Couple of the Year	Kornnaphat Sethratanapong and Lingling Kwong	Nominated	
2024	HUB Awards 2024	Main Couple of the Year	Kornnaphat Sethratanapong and Lingling Kwong	Nominated	
2024	HUB Awards 2024	Chemestry of the Year	Kornnaphat Sethratanapong and Lingling Kwong	Nominated	
2024	HUB Awards 2024	OST of the Year	"ไม่บอกก็รู้ว่ารัก"	Nominated	
2024	HUB Awards 2024	Opening of the Year	The Secret of Us	Nominated	
2024	HUB Awards 2024	Kiss Scene of the Year	The Secret of Us	Nominated	
2024	HUB Awards 2024	Dramatic Scene of the Year	The Secret of Us	Nominated	
2024	Y Entertain Awards 2024	Best GL Series of the Year	The Secret of Us	Won	
2024	Y Entertain Awards 2024	Leading Girls' Love Star of the Year	Kornnaphat Sethratanapong	Won	
2024	Y Entertain Awards 2024	Princess of Girls' Love	Lingling Kwong	Won	
2024	Y Entertain Awards 2024	Best Y Director of the Year	Saratswadee Wongsomphet	Nominated	
2024	Y Entertain Awards 2024	Best Scene of the Year	The Secret of Us	Nominated	
2024	Feed Y Awards	Most Popular Series	The Secret of Us	Won	
2024	Feed Y Awards	Most Popular Couple	Kornnaphat Sethratanapong and Lingling Kwong	Nominated	
2024	Thailand Box Office Awards	Series of the Year (GL)	The Secret of Us	Won	
2024	Thailand Box Office Awards	Actress Series of the Year	Kornnaphat Sethratanapong	Nominated	
2024	Thailand Box Office Awards	Actress Series of the Year	Lingling Kwong	Won	
2024	Thailand Box Office Awards	Director Series of the Year	Saratswadee Wongsomphet	Won	
2024	Thailand Box Office Awards	Original Song Series of the Year	"ไม่บอกก็รู้ว่ารัก"	Won	
2024	Thailand Box Office Awards	Best Couple of the Year	Kornnaphat Sethratanapong and Lingling Kwong	Won	
2024	Mint Awards	Breakthrough Cast of the Year	The Secret of Us	Won	
2024	Thailand Y Content Awards	Best Actress	Kornnaphat Sethratanapong	Won	
2024	Thailand Y Content Awards	Best Supporting Actor	Jakarin Puribhat	Won	
2024	Sanook Top of the Year 2024	The Best On-Screen Couple of 2024	Kornnaphat Sethratanapong and Lingling Kwong	Nominated	
