= Patitta Attayatamavitaya =

Thai actress and television personality

- ปทิตตา อัธยาตมวิทยา
- Born: August 26, 1986 (age 39); Thailand
- Other name: New
- Occupation: Actress
- Years active: 2008–present

Patitta Attayatamavitaya (Thai: ปทิตตา อัธยาตมวิทยา; RTGS: Pa-thit-ta Atthayatamawitthaya; born August 26, 1986), nicknamed New, is a Thai actress and television personality. She starred in the film Pai In Love.
