= Kesarin Chaichalermpol =

Thai pornographic actress (born 1985)

Chanapa Natt
- แนท ชนาภา
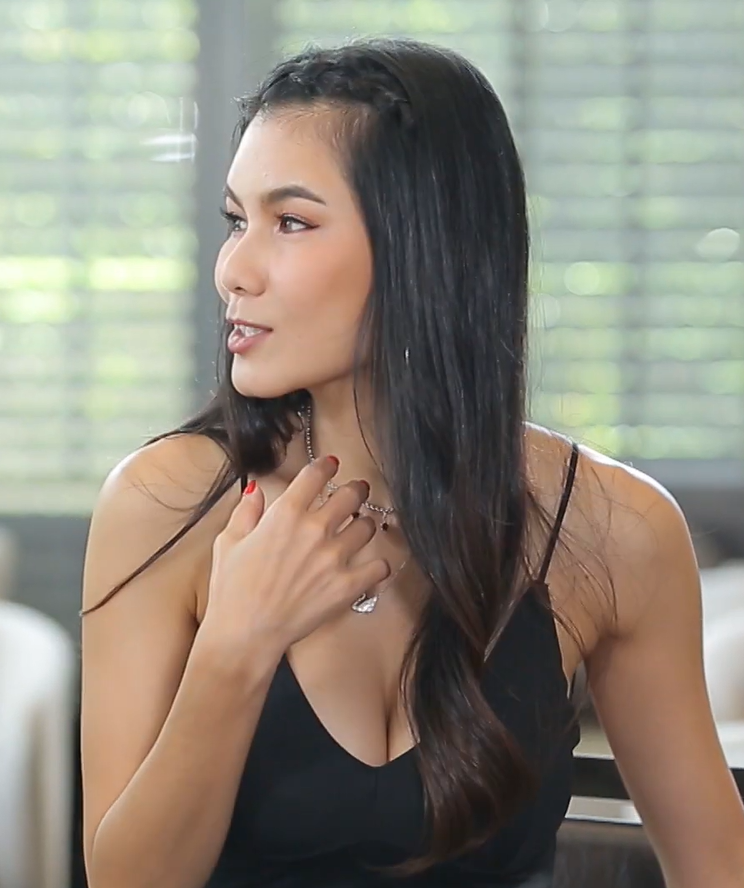
- Natt from a food show in 2019
- Born: Kesarin Chaichalermpol (เกศรินทร์ ชัยเฉลิมพล); 18 January 1985 (age 41); Saraburi, Thailand
- Other names: Natt Chanapa; Nong Natt; Natalia; Nat
- Height: 5 ft 4 in (1.63 m)
- Spouse: Harold Jennings Nesland Jr. (m. 2012; div. 2017)

Kesarin Chaichalermpol (Thai: เกศรินทร์ ชัยเฉลิมพล; RTGS: Ketsarin Chaichaloemphon) is a Thai porn actress who has acted under a number of stage names, particularly Nong Natt (Thai: น้องแนท; RTGS: Nong Naet) and Natt Chanapa (Thai: แนท ชนาภา; RTGS: Naet Chanapha).

Her father died when she was about eight or nine years old. She did not finish high school. At 14, she left school and moved to her uncle who sent her to become a cosmetic. At 16 she started acting and later got talked into the adult movie business.

== Arrest ==
Kesarin was arrested by Thai police for pornographic videos released outside Thailand. She was prosecuted on account of the videos as pornography is illegal in Thailand. The videos featured her in hardcore porn scenes with Western and Japanese men. It was revealed that modeling and advertising companies, magazines and television programs have offered her six-figure sums for modeling work since the accusation became public. She eventually had to pay a fine, received a 6-month suspended sentence, and was put on probation for a year. Harsh punishment was avoided due to her popularity and lack of public outrage concerning her crimes.

== Partial filmography ==
Year	Title	Thai Title	Role
2003	Crazy Father	พ่อตา ต๊ะติ๊งโหน่ง	
2003	Mora	โมรา นางในวรรณคดี	
2003	She's Ann	เธอชื่อแอน	
2003	Seven Days in a Coffin	กว่าจะได้เผาผี	
2011	Dragon in Love	ลอดรักลายมังกร	
2012	Jan Dara the Beginning	จัน ดารา (ภาพยนตร์ทวิภาค)	
2012	Nang Chan Raem	นางจันทร์แรม	
2012	Phuying Lalla 2	ผู้หญิงลัลล้า ยกกำลัง 2	
2012	Sao Khan Hu	สาวคันหู	
