= Nalinthip Sakulongumpai =

Thai actress and model (born 1990)

- นลินทิพย์ สกุลอ่องอำไพ
- Born: 12 August 1990 (age 35); Bangkok, Thailand
- Other names: Bua Nalinthip; Wansiri Ongumpai
- Education: ฺCommunication Arts, Suan Sunandha Rajabhat University
- Occupations: Actress; model; YouTuber
- Years active: 2006–present
- Agent: Channel 3 (2011-2022)

Nalinthip Sakulongumpai (Thai: นลินทิพย์ สกุลอ่องอำไพ; born 12 August 1990), nicknamed Bua (Thai: บัว) is a Thai actress and model. She debuted in 2006. She is known for playing Kiew in Thai TV Channel 3's Tra Barb See Chompoo (2018) and Praomook in Praomook (2021).

== Early life and education ==
Nalinthip was born on 12 August 1990 in Bangkok, Thailand. During her secondary education, she attended Sribunyanon School in Nonthaburi, Thailand.She received a Bachelor's Degree in Communication Arts from Suan Sunandha Rajabhat University in Bangkok, Thailand.

== Career ==
Nalinthip entered the Thai entertainment industry when she competed in the Miss Teen Thailand beauty pageant in 2006. Her participation in the contest opened doors for her to pursue acting as a career. She has also appeared on several other shows.

In 2014, Nalinthip made her acting debut by playing the lead role Jumjim in the drama Ruk Nee Jhe Jud Hai. Then she played supporting roles in several drama.

In 2018, she played the lead roles of twin sister Sina and Siriya in the drama Khun Mae Suam Roy. She gained popularity for her portrayal of gentle Sina and rebellious Siriya. The same year, Nalinthip played the lead role of Kangsadan/Kiew and appeared in the drama Tra Barb See Chompoo, alongside Nawasch Phupantachsee. The series was a success both domestically and internationally. Nalinthip gained widespread recognition and popularity for her portrayal of Kiew.

In 2021, She starred in the drama Praomook, playing the titular character Praomook. She played the role of Praomook or Mook opposite actor Nawasch Phupantachsee, who played the role of Chalunthorn, creating a very peculiar story in which it starts with a love-hate relationship. But eventually they will begin to fall in love with each other and will face many obstacles on their way.

Nalinthip also has a YouTube show on the Hubsub channel entitled Buasri is happy.

== Filmography ==
=== Television dramas ===
Year	Title	Role	Network	Notes
2014	Ruk Nee Jhe Jud Hai	Jumjim	Channel 3	Main Role
2014	Suae See Foon	Aul	Channel 3	
2014	Tang Duen Hang Ruk	Jane	Channel 3	Support Role
2017	Khluen Chiwit	Janejira (Jane)	Channel 3	
2017	Fan Rak Fan Salai	Aum	Channel 3	
2017	Plerng Boon	Maliawan (Wan)	Channel 3	
2017	Por Yung Lung Mai Wahng	Thoey	Channel 3	
2018	Khun Mae Suam Roy	Sina / Siriya	Channel 3	Main Role
2018	Tra Barp See Chompoo	Kangsadan (Kiew)	Channel 3	
2019	Lub Luang Jai	Toom	Channel 3	Support Role
2020	Roy Leh Marnya	Mintra	Channel 3	
2021	Praomook	Praomook (Mook)	Channel 3	Main Role
2021	Keun Ruk Salub Chata	Kulanij (Kul)	Channel 3	
2021	Sud Rai Sud Ruk	Sudrak	Channel 3	
2022	Aom Fah Oab Din	Tor Fah (Fah)	Channel 3	Main Role
2023	Manee Phayabat (Manee Morana)	Ployrung Thammapoka (Ploy) / Phailin Thammapoka ()	One 31	Main Role

=== Television series ===
Year	Title	Role	Network	Notes
2020	One Year 365	Baby' Friend	LINE TV; One 31	
2022	Club Friday 14: Love & Belief Ep. Love Tragedy	Mukrin (Muk)	One 31	Main Role

=== Music video appearances ===
Year	Title	Artist	Channel	Ref.
2023	Chan Man Pen Khon Baeb Nee (ฉันมันเป็นคนแบบนี้)	Saharat Tiampan	One 31	
2023	Saturday Night (มาดูแมวดำน้ำทำกับข้าวบ้านเรามั้ย)	Vachirawit Chivaaree	RISER Music	

== MC ==
Online

- 20 : On Air YouTube:
