= Yol Pranvarin =

Thai-Nepali actress

"Yol" Pranvarin Chaichanakul is a Thai-Nepali actress, currently residing in Thailand. She has been in the film business since she was 14 years old, and has been in a variety of commercials both in Thailand and in other countries including India and Myanmar. Pranvarin can speak three languages (Thai, English and Hindi). Yol Pranvarin is currently with BBTV channel 7 where she has been in over 15 TV series.
