= Phagkamon Punyabhuti =

Thai singer and actress (born 1988)

Lookpong Punyabhuti
- Born: ภคมน บุณยะภูติ (ลูกโป่ง); June 8, 1988 (age 38); Bangkok, Thailand
- Occupations: Artist, actress
- Label: True Fantasia
- Musical career
- Genres: Pop; R&B
- Years active: 2007–present
- Website: lpmonna.wixsite.com/lookpong

Phagkamon Punyabhuti, known as Lookpong Monna, is a Thai singer and actress. Her career was launched after finishing 4th runner up in the 4th season of the popular reality talent show Academy Fantasia. Her singing ranges from classical, operatic, musical to R&B and pop. She sings in Thai and English. Lookpong is a soprano.

== Biography ==
Lookpong was born in Bangkok, Thailand. She has one older sister. Lookpong started her elementary education at Phra Manda Nijjanukhroh School, secondary school at Bodindecha (Sing Singhaseni) School.

Her singing bug started early. When she was three years old, the family was having dinner in a restaurant with a live band. Lookpong marched towards the stage and began to sing. The band singer, Chen Chen, then carried Little Lookpong onstage and asked her to join in a singalong. Her mother also loved singing and has sung with her daughter on many occasions. She recognised her daughter's singing talent early on and encouraged Lookpong to take singing lessons at the age of ten. Lookpong and her sibling had been raised by their mother when her father died (on military duty) when she was ten years old. Lookpong had shown sign of singing talent in school and had represented her schools in various singing contests and won many trophies.

=== Education ===
Lookpong graduated with a bachelor's degree in Classical Music from Faculty of Fine and Applied Arts at Chulalongkorn University in 2011. (Chulalongkorn University is Thailand's foremost and most prestigious university.)

== Academy Fantasia ==
While in her junior year at Chulalongkorn University, at the age of 18, Lookpong auditioned for the popular Academy Fantasia Reality Show and was among the final 20 contestants out of tens of thousands of applicants throughout the country. The show was a showcase for aspiring singers whereby participants would be trained and gave stage performances each week. Held over a period of 12 weeks, each contestant would go to the next stage through votes from both TV and live audience. Lookpong was among the finalists performing the Final Concert at Impact Arena on September 8, 2007). She was the 4th runner up.

Lookpong sang Thai songs and international hits like Listen, One Night Only, Wannabe (girl group), I Will Survive, All I Ask of You (duet), My Heart Will Go On, The Final Countdown (group), Come on Over. Among these, "One Moment in Time" had been her best performance, in which Lookpong received the loudest and longest applause. Lookpong's version of "One Moment in Time" has been considered one of the best cover versions in Thailand.

=== Performances/Results ===
- Week 1 – theme: Final audition: Listen – Lookpong (V17)
- Week 2 – theme: The Best of Me: One Night Only – Lookpong (V17) Feat. Eingeing (V6), Puifai (V18)
- Week 3 – Theme: Thai Contemporary: รักต้องห้าม – Lookpong (V17); เทิดพระเกรียติ ภูมิแผ่นดิน นวมินทร์มหาราชา – AF4
- Week 4 – theme: Boy Band & Girl Group: เด็กมีปัญหา – Lookpong (V17) Feat. Cat (V11); คนในนิยาย – Lookpong (V17) Feat. Cat (V11), Puifai (V18); Wannabe – Girl Group AF4
- Week 5 – Theme: Thai Country: ไม่ได้ตั้งใจดำ – Lookpong (V17)
- Week 6 – Theme: Cover Hits: ไม่รักดี – Lookpong (V17); I will survive – Girl Group AF4
- Week 7 – Theme: Superstars Superhits: All I Ask of You – Lookpong (V17) Feat. Nat (V1); My heart will go on – Lookpong (V17)
- Week 8 – Theme: Tele Songs: ทำไมไม่รับซักที – Lookpong (V17); ศรีแผ่นดิน นวมินทร์มหาราชินี – AF4; โทรมาอีกแล้ว – Lookpong (V17); Just Called to Say I Love You – Lookpong (V17); ค่าน้ำนม – Lookpong (V17) Feat. Papang (V3), Eingeing (V6), Nat (V1), Tol (V9), Tee (V12)
- Week 9 – Theme: Cheer: One moment in time – Lookpong (V17); Medley We Will Rock You + Ole Ole Ole – AF4; The Final Countdown – Lookpong (V17) Feat. Papang (V3), Eingeing (V6), Nat (V1), Tol (V9), Tee (V12), Music (V8); Cheer – Lookpong (V17) Feat. Tol (V9), Tee (V12)
- Week 10 – Theme: Karaoke (Surprised), ฉันทำผิดเอง – Lookpong (V17); อยากเก็บเธอไว้ทั้งสองคน – Lookpong (V17)
- Week 11 – Theme: Dance: Come on Over – Lookpong (V17); อาโบเดเบ – Girl Group AF4; เจ้าช่อมาลี – AF4, Medley Dance ลองซิจ๊ะ, All I wanna Do, OK นะคะ, ไปด้วยกันนะ – AF4
- Week 12 – Theme: Contestant's Favourites (Finale): And I'm Telling You I'm Not Going – Lookpong (V17); ส้มหล่น – Lookpong (V17)
- Week 13 – Theme: Contestant's The Best of AF4 & His Majesty The King's Songs (The Extra Week): One moment in time – Lookpong (V17); ภูมิแผ่นดิน – AF4 20 V; พ่อแห่งแผ่นดิน – AF4 20 V

== Post Academy Fantasia career ==
After signing a five-year contract with Academy Fantasia, Lookpong and her fellow AF4 contestants released a group album called X-Treme Army incorporating Lookpong's first single—Don't Say Goodbye which was rather well received.

In order to showcase individual talent, all 12 singers had been divided into 4 groups:- Rock Army, Pop Army, Spice Army and Voice Army, of which Lookpong belonged to the latter. A nationwide concert tour had been launched to promote the album. The X-treme Army in Concert was held in Bangkok (October 13, 2007), Surat Thani (October 20, 2007), Chiang Mai (October 27, 2007) and Udon Thani (November 3, 2007). On December 15–19, 2007, Lookpong and her AF4 fellows joined THAI Exclusive Trip with AF4 'X-Treme Army in Beijing'.

Throughout her career, Lookpong has travelled extensively to China, Japan, the Philippines, Singapore, Australia and England.

== Discography ==
2014

- 'ความจริง...แค่ในเมื่อวาน' 3rd single from Lookpong 's Single

2013

- 'I Do' 2nd single from Lookpong 's Single

2012

- 'บางที (sometime)' 1st single from Lookpong 's Single
- Musical play album 'Prissana the Musical’

2011

- 'Glai..Gun Wai Gon'(ใกล้..กันไว้ก่อน) from 'HIV Pong Gun Dai'(HIV ป้องกันได้) campaign by Research Centre for Health Economics and Evaluation

2009

- 2nd solo album 'Lulla (ลั้ล...ลา)'
- 'Kam Mai Rak'(คำไม่รัก) 1st single Musical play from album 'The Legend of RE KHAI FUN: CHALIANG the Musical’

2008

- 1st solo album 'Crush on!(ครัชออน!)'
- Musical play album 'AF the Musical : Jo Jo San’

2007

- 'Don't Say Good Bye' 1st single from album AF4 'X-Treme Army'

== Awards and Accolades ==
- 96th FHM 100 Sexiest Women in Thailand 2013
- AF4 Change & Share television documentary on His Majesty the King's Royal Project.
- Co- Brand Ambassador for Muang Thai Life Assurance Company with Boy AF2, Patcha AF2 and Aof AF2.
- 4th Runner up True Academy Fantasia Reality Show 4th season.
- Won Five Region Singing Contest
- Won Sala Chalerm Krung Singing Contest
- Won the Education Ministry's Trophy by HRH Somdej Phra Thepratanasuda
- Won the Center Point Singing Contest

== Acting Role ==
Lookpong has appeared in a variety of stage musicals, television and films.

2015

- In January 2015, Lookpong will be back on stage in a Thai Musical "Khor Hai Muan Derm". The Musical will be on from January–March 2515.
- Lookpong will be co-starring in a new TV series, a remake of classic "Sapai Jao" where she will be taking on the role of "Wirongrong" a fashionable magazine editor. The series will be shown on Channel 3 (Thailand) in 2015.
- Following a successful first television series of Pol, Nikorn, Kim Nguan or PNK in 2014, PNK (an adaptation of popular classic comedy) will return for another series in 2015. Lookpong will reprise her role as Nual Laor, the wife of millionaire Kim Nguan.

2014

- Pol Nikorn Kim Gnuan, the musical ( a television comedy series) @ TRUE4U True Corporation
- The Butler Film by TrueVisions.

2012

- Prissana the Musical, as Ratee.

2009

- The Legend of Rae Khai Fan, the musical, as Pye R.

2008

- Title role in the musical "Jojo-san" (an adaptation of Madame Butterfly) on stage in 2008.

== Presenter ==
Lookpong has been a presenter on various television programs.

- Cinema Show @LOCA TV (TV Pool) where she interviewed James Gunn, the Director and Zoe Saldaña cast of Guardians of the Galaxy at the film's Southeast Asian Press Tour in July 2014.
- Sud sud Pai Leui @TNN 24(TNN)
- WeLoveShopping Gang @TrueLife TV
- Lookpong loves animals, especially dogs, she had been a presenter for Pet Lover by Jerhigh Television programme on TNN Channel, aired between 2011–12, whereby her beloved family of Chihuahuas, Wasabi, Jennifer and Isabella had also appeared regularly with her.
- Guest presenter in "Mam Variety Show" Royal Thai Army Radio and Television Channel 5.
- True Life Plus @TNN 24(TNN)

== Publications ==
Lookpong has appeared in a number of publications, including cover of the popular Women's Magazine

- True AF4 Symphony of Dreams
- Praew Magazine
- Praew Sudsapada
- Priew Magazine
- Poo Ying Magazine (swimsuit)
- Kullasatree Magazine
- Volume
- Front
- You and Me
- I-Spy
- Lisa
- Slimming
- Kazz
- Hamburger
- LIPS
- In magazine

== Concerts ==
2014

- After Seasons Changed ... ฤดูกาลเปลี่ยนไป หัวใจยังคงเดิม (Thong Lor Art Space Bangkok)
- The Symphony of Inspiration ( Siam Pavalai Theatre (6th Fl. Siam Paragon))

2013

- 'Hua Hin Jazz Festival Concert (Hua-Hin)
- 'Kamlangjai Concert : INSPiRE' (Centara Grand)
- 'Ohm Chatree Live The director's cut' concert (Central World Live)

2012

- 'AF4 Joubpa!!!' (AF4 จบป่ะ!!!) (Grand Hall Thammasat University)
- "Peace through Music Charity Concert – "A Night at the Movies"

2011

- 'KRUNGSRI AF Comedy Show Must Go On' Concert (Thunder Dome)
- 'AF4 Re-Stage' (Thai-Japan Bangkok Youth Center)
- 'KRUNGSRI AF ALL SEASONS' Concert (Impact, Muang Thong Thani)

2010

- 'Mild The Unlovable Live in Sydney' Concert (Australia)
- 'KRUNGSRI The Young Bachelors and Single Ladies' Concert (Thunder Dome)
- 'Symphony for Our Beloved City' (Lumpini Park in Bangkok)

2009

- 'Big C Big Love Concert With AF5 The Color of Love' (Thunder Dome)
- 'KRUNGSRI AF Fans Festival'Concert (Chulalongkorn University Stadium)

2008

- 'Pepsi AF Move Tem Max' Concert (Thunder Dome)
- 'Big C Big Love Concert with AF4' (Thunder Dome)
- 'Six in the City Concert' (Royal Pragon Hall)
- 'KRUNGSRI AF Funtasia : Cooling the World' (Safari World)

2007

- 'X-Treme Army' Concert (Impact, Muang Thong Thani)
- 'True Music Interactive Concert : Music Phenomeno' (Moon Star Studio)
- 'Krungsri AF Funtasia' (Dream World)

== Personal life ==
Lookpong is single and currently lives in Bangkok with her mother and three Chihuahuas, Wasabi, Mijang and Foie Gras. She has an older sister who lives and works in US. Lookpong loves movies, reading, fashion and has designed a clothing range for dogs.

== See also ==
- Academy Fantasia
