= Nattasha Bunprachom =

Thai model and actress

- ณัฐฐชาช์ บุญประชม
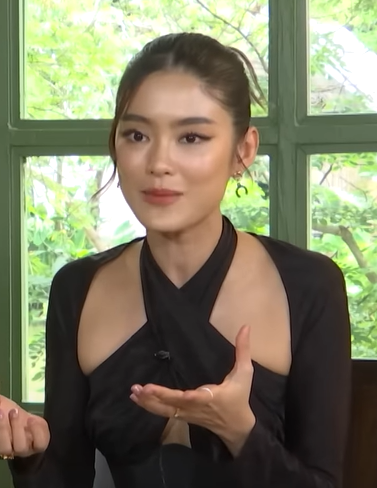
- Born: Rawiwan Bunprachom; February 19, 1987 (age 39); Bangkok, Thailand
- Other names: Yoghurt / Yo (Nickname); Nattasha Bunprachom
- Education: Chulalongkorn University (Faculty of Engineering)
- Occupations: Actress; model
- Years active: 2013–present
- Agent: Channel 3 (2016–2024)
- Height: 1.75 m (5 ft 9 in)
- Spouse: Piyawat Kempetch (m. 2019; div. 2024)

Nattasha Bunprachom (Thai: ณัฐฐชาช์ บุญประชม, RTGS: Natthacha Bunprachom; born February 19, 1987), nicknamed Yoghurt (Thai: โยเกิร์ต), is a Chinese-Thai model and actress.

== Early life ==
Nattasha was born on February 19, 1987, in Bangkok, Thailand. She completed her primary education at Rudee School and her secondary education at Suksanari School. She holds both a bachelor's and a master's degree in Electrical Engineering from Chulalongkorn University.

=== Career ===
Nattasha began her career in the modeling industry, walking in fashion shows and appearing in magazines. She gained significant recognition as an actress for her role as the villainous "Boonmee" in the 2016 remake of the period drama Nang Tard produced by TV Scene. Following this performance, she signed an acting contract with Channel 3.

In addition to dramas, Nattasha has appeared in several music videos, including "Bid" (Twist) by Hunz The Star, "Fun Rue Plao" (Dream?) by Armchair, "Ter" (Her) by Cocktail, and "Tee Leua Kue Rak Tae" (The Rest is True Love) by Pang Nakarin. In 2013, she was ranked 18th in FHM Thailand's "100 Sexiest Women in the World" list.

== Personal life ==
Nattasha married television host Piyawat Kempetch on October 16, 2019. In March 2024, the couple publicly announced their separation and legally divorced.

== Filmography ==
=== Television series ===
Year	Title	Role	Network	Notes
2016	Nang Tard	Boonmee	Channel 3	Debut role (Villain)
2016	Plerng Naree	Koranan Bupakriat ("Grace")	Channel 3	
2018	The Crown Princess	Sergeant Danika Samuthyakorn ("Paen")	Channel 3	
2018	Duang Jai Nai Fai Nhao	Pinmook Silathong	Channel 3	
2018	Chart Suer Pun Mungkorn	Lim Lee Ngek	Channel 3	
2019	Plerng Prang Tian	Patima (Present) / Princess Wong Duen (Past)	Channel 3	
2019	My Love From Another Star	Meena	Channel 3	Cameo appearance
2021	Barb Ayuttitham (Eternal)	Namthip ("Thip")	Channel 3	
2022	Pom Sanaeha (Poisonous Passion)	Pimapsorn Narubodeejarouk ("Sorn")	Channel 3	
2022	Rak Kaew (The Root)	Charawee ("Cha")	Channel 3	
2024	Lom Len Fai (Exes & Missus)	Watsika ("Fon")	Channel 3	Main Role
2024	Wan Rak Tong Ham (The Sweetest Taboo)	Gina	Channel 3	
TBA	Pin Anong	Thatsanee	One 31	Filming

=== Music videos ===
Year	Song Title	Artist	Notes
2012	"Bid" (Twist)	Hunz The Star	
2012	"Pretty Killer"	C-Quint	
2013	"Fun Rue Plao" (Dream?)	Armchair	
2013	"Com' On"	Ton Thanasit	
2014	"Ter" (Her)	Cocktail	Viral hit with over 250M views
2014	"Tee Leua Kue Rak Tae"	Pang Nakarin	
2016	"Kayee Ta" (Rub Eyes)	Champ Suppawat	
2017	"Dan Dai Aye Od"	Ten Nararak	
2017	"Krob Krong" (Possess)	Hugo	
2017	"Seuam" (Decay)	Ten Nararak	
2024	"Phuk Phan Tong La"	Gavind	
2025	"Jeb Hai Pang"	Klear	

== Awards ==
- 18th Prize of 100 Sexy Girls FHM 2013
- HOWE AWARDS 2019 HOWE SOULMATE AWARD
