= XOXO Entertainment =

Thai record label

- Parent company: Workpoint Entertainment; T-Pop Incorporation
- Founded: 2020
- Genre: Thai pop music; Pop music; Pop dance
- Location: 99 Bangpoon Subdistrict Mueang Pathum Thani District Pathumthani Province 12000 Thailand

XOXO Entertainment (Thai: เอ็กซ์โอเอ็กซ์โอเอนเตอร์เทนเมนต์) is a record label in Thailand. It was founded in 2020 under Workpoint Entertainment Public Company Limited and T-Pop Incorporation Company Limited, with emphasis on Thai pop music (T-Pop), including pop music and pop dance. It also has a subsidiary record label, XOFLOW, which focuses on hip-hop.

== History ==
=== 2020 ===
==== Launch of the company and the first Girl Group 4EVE ====
XOXO Entertainment was launched in 2020 with the broadcast of the survival show 4EVE Girl Group Star on Workpoint TV. The show aimed to find and sign XOXO Entertainment's first Girl Group from over 1000 applicants. Following the conclusion of the show, all 7 chosen members of the group made their official debut on Wednesday, December 23, 2020, at the KBank Siam Pic-Ganesha Theater Siam Square One Shopping Center.

=== 2021 ===
==== Release of 4EVE's first album and Project NVL (Neverland) Boy Star ====
On Sunday, March 28, 2021, 4EVE The First Album was released. Later, in May, XOXO Entertainment opened applications and held auditions for male trainees under a project called Neverland Boy Star. Like 4EVE Girl Group Star, it followed a survival show format to discover XOXO Entertainment's new boy band.

==== The First Boy Band ATLAS ====
In September 2021, the name of XOXO Entertainment's first Boy Band was announced—ATLAS (แอทลาส). Members were officially revealed and made their official debut on Tuesday, December 7, 2021, at the forecourt of Central World.

==== First male and female solo artists WAII and Jack Jarupong ====
On December 24, 2021, XOXO Entertainment released a single with a music video welcoming Christmas Day, Mysterious things in the universe (สิ่งลึกลับซับซ้อนในจักรวาล), an old song from the band Juliet Balcony, written by Prapas Cholsaranon, national artist and deputy chief executive officer of Workpoint Entertainment. This single also introduced two new artists, Jack Jarupong Kluaymai-ngam (จารุพงศ์ กล้วยไม้งาม) and Waii Panyarisa Thienprasit (ปัญญริสา เธียรประสิทธิ์), former artists of Kamikaze label in a subsidiary of the RS company, along with six trainees in the label.
