= List of Thai girl groups =

List of Thai girl groups contains all musical groups with exclusively female leads.

== 1981 - 1990 ==
Name	Label	Active
Sao Sao Sao	Rod Fai Don Tri	1981-1990
Puifai	RS	1983-1987
Pooying	Polydor	1986-1989
Maya	RS	1987 reunited 2019

== 1991 - 2000 ==
Name	Label	Active
Carrot	Nititad Promotion	1992-1996
T-skirt	Kita Records	1995-1996
Angies	Polygram	1997-1999
X3 Super Gang	GMM Grammy	1997-1999
Vivico	Crossezone	1998-2001
Bubble Girls	GMM Grammy	1998-2001
ZAZA	GMM Grammy	1998–present
JAMP	GMM Grammy	1999-2001
H	Dojo City	1999-2004
Triumphs Kingdom	Dojo City	1999-2001
Bug Bunji	GMM Grammy	2000-2000

== 2001 - 2010 ==
Name	Label	Active
2002 Ratree	GMM Grammy	2001-2009
3G	GMM Grammy	2002-2003
Girly Berry	RS	2002-2014
The Sis	RS	2002-2007
Girl Force	Sony Music Entertainment	2002-2002
Basket	GMM Grammy	2003-2004
Zig-Zag	RS	2003-2004
001	RS	2003-2004
Cinderella	RS	2004-2008
Power Pop Girls	True Fantasia	2005-2006
Dreams Two	RS	2005-2006
Q'ty	GMM Grammy	2006-2008
Preppy G	GMM Grammy	2006-2009
Alize	RS	2009-2011
FFK	Kamikaze	2009 reunited 2019
Chilli White Choc	Kamikaze	2009-2011
Seven Days	Kamikaze	2009-2010
Popcorn	Music Design	2009-2010
Candy Mafia	MONO MUSIC	2009-2014
G-TWENTY	MONO MUSIC	2009-2014
G2G	True Fantasia	2009-2010
Beauty G	RS	2010-2010
Kiss Me Five	Kamikaze	2010-2013
SWEE:D	Kamikaze	2010-2011
Sugar Eyes	Sony Music Entertainment	2010-2015
Samosorn Chimi	Rsiam	2010-2017

== 2011 - 2020 ==
Name	Label	Active
Olives	GMM Grammy	2011–present
La Sista	True Fantasia	2011-2013
Naka	True Fantasia	2011-2014
Seven Days 2	Kamikaze	2012-2013
The Poison	Iconic Records	2012-2013
Shuu	CHO Music	2013-2015
Tweenie 90's	EM Entertainment	2013-2014
Wii6	MIB Agency	2013-2014
Gaia	Do A Dot Art Maker	2013-2006
Hcute	HEH Entertainment	2014-2015
Cup C	MONO MUSIC	2014-2015
Siamese Kittenz	KelbaMusic	2015-2018
MilkShake	Halo Society	2015-2016
Sound Cream	Grand Musik	2017-2018
So-M	Brick House	2017-2018
BNK48	iAM	2017–present
MONO MUSES	MONO MUSIC	2017–present
Sweat16	LOVEiS and โยชิโมโต้	2017-2022
Seventh Sense	7th Sense Group	2018-2019
Siam☆Dream	Siamdol	2018-2023
Rose Quartz	0316 Entertainment	2018–present
Dev Zero	-	2018-2018
Gelato	MONO MUSIC	2018-2020
FEVER	Roamrun Entertainment	2018-2011
A-Muse	Dreamtime Entertainment	2018–present
SomeiYoshino51	Seoul Artist Studio	2018-2021
Secret12	B-Stars Music	2018–present
JNP	-	2018–present
AKIRA KURØ	-	2018–present
Lemonade	KNW Entertainment	2018-2019
Bite Me	B Stars Music	2018–present
9Qteens	-	2019-2020
PraewaGG	-	2018-2019
HAPPYTAIL	-	2018–present
Double S	Ugly Duck Records	2018-2019
NightsugarstarsIdol	-	2019–present
Taste of Love	-	2019-2019
Black Dolls	MADEK STUDIO	2019–present
Blissful	TB Entertainment	2019-2019
FMA Parfait	CM CAFE x FMA Group	2019-2020
Honey Toast	CM CAFE (CORE MUSIC)	2019–present
TRIXX	Artemis Talent Agency	2019-2019
Melt Mallow	Sea Lestrail Entertainment	2019-2020
Shu Shu	-	2019-2020
Black Forest	Ariya Entertainment	2019
BHX	BH Brick House	2019–present
Hi-U	MBO	2019-2020
CGM48	iAM	2019–present
Violet Wink	Violet Wink Official	2019-2020
Shining Stars	REN Entertainment	2019–present
Daisy Daisy	Merry Go Sound	2019–present
Polaris	Moon Child Project	2019–present
Luv Season	-	2019-2020
Mayday	-	2019–present
White Out	-	2019-2021
TossaGirls	White Line	2019–present
1stkizz	B Stars Music	2019–present
Fingers Cross	-	2019–present
MIMIGUMO	iAM	2019-2022
Sizzy	GMMTV	2019–present
The Glass Girls	TGG Entertainment	2019–present
Zenretsukiri Tokutenkai	Zenkiri Official	2019–present
ASTER	Merry Go Sound	2019-2022
Wisdom	Wattanapanya Entertainment → ARTIFACT Entertainment	2019–present
AMERYU	mint Music Entertainment	2019-2021
SUMOMO	UPDANCE ENTERTAINMENT	2019–present
RedSpin	BH BrickHouse → WYNN Entertainment	2019
Girls Twelve	BR Buri Official	2019-2020
WISH23	UP Music & Embrace Studio	2019-present
HaniChuu	HaniChuu Team	2019-2020
CHARISMA	-	2020-2020
Pretzelle	Five Four Records	2020–present
Memoriz (formerly: FriendZone)	Kanomthai Entertainment	2020-2022
SoulSistar	Be Elegance	2020–present
Saizenkanri Syndicate	Saisyn Official	2020-2020
Florizta	Florizta Official	2020–present
LaBis	LoveiS Entertainment	2020-2021
A'T-Miss	Ai Entertainment	2020-2020
Aliszt	YN11 Entertainments	2020–present
QRRA (formerly: LYRA/VYRA)	iAM x Universal Music Thailand→ Independent Record (iR)	2020–present
4Eve	XOXO Entertainment	2020–present
RainbowFlower	-	2020–present
TERRA	2ndR Entertainment	2020-present

== 2021 - 2030 ==
Name	Label	Active
iWish	MCA Entertainment	2021–present
BB Khon	NKS Station	2021-2022
Wisher	ReSweet Music Label	2021–present
PiXXiE	LIT ENTERTAINMENT	2021–present
AR3NA	411 ENTERTAINMENT	2021–present
PEACH YOU	GENCUTE OFFICIAL	2021–present
INDY CAMP	iAM	2021–present
LAST IDOL (THAILAND)	LAST IDOL (THAILAND) OFFICIAL	2021-2023
Sora! Sora!	Catsolute	2021–present
POP UP	Khaimoog CNY	2021–present
Celeste (formerly: Idol Paradise)	VCM Corporation	2022-2023
DIDIxDADA	LIT ENTERTAINMENT	2022–present
BEACHY	WATCH ENTERAIN	2022–present
MIRA MIR	-	2022–present
DEADKAT	Blackat Record	2022–present
WISH ME	ESC Entertainment	2022-2022
STARDASH	-	2022–present
eRa	Independent Record (IR)	2022–present
Indy Camp 2	Independent Record (IR)	2022–present
VENITA	XOXO ENTERTAINMENT	2022-present
Slow Sundae	Club After Class	2022-present
alala	White Fox	2022–present
bXd	4NOLOGUE	2022–present
MXFruit	ILY Lab	2023–present
Ivelyn	8Bit Entertainment	2023-present
Miruku	CMJ	2023-present
COSMOS	Star Hunter Entertainment	2023-present
MINDY	BLDMD ENTERTAINMENT	2023-present
VIIS	G’NEST(GMM Grammy)	2023-present
QUADLIPS	Superball	2024-present
DaruNi	Rabbit Moon	2024-present
KYLINZ	ic45 entertainment	2024-present
NyZas	Zound20 Music	2024-present
EMPRESS	Rising Entertainment	2024-present
Wizzle	BRIQ Entertainment	2024-present
Gen1es	RYCE Entertainment	2024-present
Sugar ’N Spice (SNS)	LIT ENTERTAINMENT	2024-present
THX	E29 Music Identities	2024-present
Lumi	Rabbit moon	2024-present
DISSY	Starway Nova	2024-present
PEPPER X	Pleng Entertainment	2024-present
Flora	KAAM THAILAND	2025-present
RE1ME1	Mother Earth	2025-present
Blyss	BEC Music	2025-present
FELIZZ	Riser Music	2025-present
Véra	AirAsia	2025-present
VVIBE	Home Run Music	2025-present
GAMMA	Persona Entertainment	2025-present
Ripacute	MONOPHINE and Gravity Tone Records	2025-present
VividByte	BeingYou Entertainment	2025-present
Neko Pon!	GENAi Entertainment	2025-present
QVINT	Whitekat Records	2025-present
ily	XOXO Entertainment	2025-present
High vibes	Whiteline music	2025-present
CHERIS	G’NEST(GMM Grammy)	2025-present
BaDiz	WanLove Music	2025-present
KATCHA	DoubleM Entertainment	2025-present
Kiismet	OneMusic	2026-present
namp	xoxo entertainment	2026-present
dream:0n	catsolute	2026-present
Neko Wink	BLT World Entertainment	2026-present
ZYN	IC45 Entertainment	2026-present
CHiLLiZ	OS Music Lab	2026-present
TACE	LOVEiS Entertainment	2026-present

== See also ==
- Music of Thailand
