= Pretzel (disambiguation) =

A pretzel is a baked snack.

Pretzel may also refer to:

- Pretzel (picture book), a 1944 children's picture book by Margret & H. A. Rey
- Pretzel Amusement Ride Company, the dark ride manufacturer
- Pretzels Getzien (1864–1932), German baseball player
- Pretzel Pezzullo (1910–1990), American baseball player
- Pretzel syndrome, a rare disorder

== See also ==
- Pretzelle, a defunct Thai girl group
