= Andrea Suárez (singer) =

Thai singer

Andrea Suárez แอนเดรีย สวอเรซ
- Also known as: Wipawee Suárez; วิภาวี สวอเรซ; Wonder Girl
- Born: January 2, 1979 (age 47); United States
- Origin: Bangkok, Thailand
- Genres: Thai pop; teen pop
- Occupations: Singer; dancer; lawyer
- Instruments: Vocals; jazz dance
- Years active: 1995–2001; 2007 (acting)
- Label: Kita (1995–1996)

Andrea Suárez (Thai: แอนเดรีย สวอเรซ) is a Thai-American singer.

== Biography and career ==
Suárez was born on January 2 1979, in the United States. She has Thai and American citizenships and has a lineage of Spanish and Puerto Rican as well. She entered the showbiz at the age of 13 years as a model with back up dancer. And from the ability that both can sing, performance jazz dance very well she then signed a contract with a giant label at that time, Kita Entertainment and released her first studio album Andrea in 1995.

She was immediately famous with single Sob Ta (สบตา; lit: "eye contact") along with other singles on the same album. Until she was dubbed "Wonder Girl" alike Grammy Entertainment's Tata Young. At that time, both of them were keeping an eye on as superstar singers in the near future.

Soon later, she released two mini-albums and withdrew from the music industry to learning and live in the United States.

In 2007, she returned to the stage again by performing a special concert to commemorate Kita Entertainment under titled "Kita Back To The Future Concert".

Suárez is now married to an American husband named Michael, they are lovers since the age of 14. She works as a lawyer for business and labor law and living in California.

== See also ==
- T-Skirt
