= Wong shadow =

Thai pop music

- Native name: วงชาโดว์
- Other names: Shadow music
- Stylistic origins: American rhythm and blues; Early rock'n'roll; Surf rock; beat music; exotica; Hollywood film scores; country; garage rock; rockabilly; traditional Thai music
- Cultural origins: Early 1960s, Thailand
- Derivative forms: Thai rock; Thai pop

Other topics
- Thai hip hop; pleng phua cheewit

Wong shadow (Thai: วงชาโดว์; lit. 'Shadow band') was a short-lived Thai popular music in the early 1960s. It was developed by native Thai musicians inspired by Western groups such as Cliff Richard & the Shadows. Its origins lie in British and American R&B, surf rock artists like The Ventures, Dick Dale, Exotica, rockabilly and country and western brought over by soldiers serving in Vietnam in the late 1950s and early 1960s when on R&R. It also drew heavily on British Invasion rock'n'roll, garage rock and Hollywood film soundtracks as well.

Wong shadow is also a broad term for all popular music based on American R&B etc, though some British and American psychedelic rock acts drew on indigenous musical forms as well as rock'n'roll. The style's most representative artists were Johnny Guitar (จอนนี่ส์กีตาร์), P.M. Pocket Music (พี.เอ็ม.พ๊อกเกทมิวสิค) and Khabuan Mukda (ขบวน มุกดา). Wong shadow was also an influence on later genres, such as Thai pop and Thai rock.

It was originally known as "Shadow Music" following the release of the compilation Shadow Prayuk (ชาโดว์ ประยุกต์; Modernized The Shadow). The genre took its name from the band the Shadows.

== See also ==
- Phleng Thai sakol
- Music of Thailand
- Thai contemporary art
- Culture of Thailand
