= UHT (disambiguation) =

UHT is ultra-high-temperature processing (or ultra heat treatment), used to sterilize milk.

UHT or Uht may also refer to:

- Unhextrium, chemical element 163, symbol Uht
- Ultra-high-temperature metamorphism in geology
- United Hebrew Trades, New York, US, 1880s
- Unterstützungshubschrauber Tiger, a variant of Eurocopter Tiger
- The Ukrainian Heraldry Society (Ukrayinske Heraldychne Tovarystvo)
- UHT (band), a Thai boy band
