= Andrea Suárez =

Andrea Suárez may refer to:

- Andrea Suárez (beauty pageant contestant) (born 1987), Ecuadorian beauty pageant titleholder
- Andrea Suárez (singer) (born 1979), Thai-American singer
- Andrea Suarez, founder of We Heart Seattle
