= 5th Avenue (album) =

Studio album by Christina Aguilar
- Released: 28 January 1999 (Thailand)
- Genres: T-pop; dance-pop
- Language: Thai
- Label: GMM Grammy
- Producer: Chumpon Supanyo

Christina Aguilar chronology
Golden Eye (1997)	5th Avenue (1999)	Dancing Queen (2001)

5th Avenue is the fifth studio album by Thai singer Christina Aguilar, released by GMM Grammy on 28 January 1999.

== Track listing ==
No.	Title	Lyrics	Music	Arrangement	Length
1.	"Ro Eek Nid Nueng" (รออีกนิดนึง; "Wait a Little More")	Mu Nmu	Solot Punkabut	Punkabut
2.	"Nueng Nathee" (หนึ่งนาที; "One Minute")	Sarapee Sirisamphan	Apichai Yenpoonsuk	Yenpoonsuk
3.	"Phoo Chai Khee Luem" (ผู้ชายขี้ลืม; "A Forgetful Man")	Annop Chansuta	Rungroj Phonwa	Phonwa
4.	"Oun Jai" (อุ่นใจ; "Peace of Mind")	Kanyarat Waranawat	Chatri Kongsuwan	Kongsuwan
5.	"Chan Mong Mai Hen Crai Leaw" (ฉันมองไม่เห็นใครเลย; "I Can't See Anyone")	Warachaya Phromsathit	Pongprom Snitwong Na Ayutthaya	Snitwong Na Ayutthaya
6.	"Sed Eek Lah" (เสร็จอีกละ; "Done Again")	Khumsam Meesilasasuk	Chumpol Supanyo	Supanyo
7.	"Ru Doo Kan" (Season)" (ฤดูกาล; "Season")	Surak Suksawee	Somchai Khamlertkul	Supanyo
8.	"Rub Noi Noi Hai Mak Noi" (รับน้อยหน่อยให้มากหน่อย; "Get a Little More")	Taweesak Burirak; Wiwat Chatteeraphap	Worawit Pikunthong	Pikunthong
9.	"Ou Kab Chan Nah" (อยู่กับฉันนะ; "Stay with Me")	Phattharaphon Luengtrakul; Chakrawut Saengphon	Supanyo	Supanyo
10.	"Let's Say Goodbye"	Chakrawut Sawaengphon	Mr. Sam	Supanyo
