= T-Skirt =

Thai girl group

- Origin: Bangkok, Thailand
- Genres: Pop; Dance-pop; Teen pop
- Years active: 1995–1996, 2018
- Label: Kita Entertainment
- Past members: Asama "Mar" Kahar; Duangporn "Joy" Sontikhan; Thitiya "Gift" Noppongsakit

T-Skirt (Thai: ที-สเกิ๊ต) was a Thai girl group that was popular in the 1990s under Kita Entertainment. They can be considered as the second Thai girl trio since Sao Sao Sao in the 1980s.

== History ==
T-Skirt released their first album in 1995 with an image of Japanese gal-like costume, focusing on bright colors for each member, and miniskirts. Making them resembring Sailor Moon, a popular Japanese magical girl anime at the time. With their outstanding image, they easily became the teen idols, especially teen girls, and the LGBTQ group. T-Skirt made their debut with a mini concert at Siam Square, a place to hang out for teens, where the audience was packed.

Before that, during the audition, Tata Young also came to test with them. With her outstanding talent, she became a solo artist of Grammy Entertainment at the end of the same year.

The group popular songs include Mai Tao Rai (ไม่เท่าไหร่, "It's nothing"), Jeb Tan Dai Mai (เจ็บแทนได้ไหม, "Can I hurt instead?"), Sueng Sueng Noi (ซึ้ง ๆ หน่อย, "Little appreciated"), (Note: Legally converted from a Japanese さよならから始まる物語 by CoCo.) Rueang Man Sao (เรื่องมันเศร้า, "Sad story"), Fong Tan Pao (ฟ้องท่านเปา, "File a Lord Pao") what with the popularity of the Taiwanese TV series Justice Pao, which was broadcast on Channel 3 and was very popular at that time. The first album was promoted for a full year, almost two years, and sold over a million copies.

The following year, 1996, their second album was released, but it was not as successful as before. Soon after, their stable faced business problems and had to close down, and the group disbanded.

In 2018, the group reunited for a special event GREEN CONCERT # 21 Dance Fever along with other famous singers and bands from the 1990s.

They are still active in the Thai showbiz today as front and behind the scenes personnel.

== Members ==
- Asama "Mar" Kahar: ("มาร์" อัสมา กฮาร์) birth 24 December 1974 (age 51)
- Duangporn "Joy" Sontikhan: ("จอย" ดวงพร สนธิขันธ์) birth 19 June 1978 (age 48)
- Thitiya "Gift" Noppongsakit: ("กิ๊ฟ" ธิติยา นพพงษากิจ) birth 9 April 1980 (age 46)

== Discography ==
=== Studio albums ===
- T-Skirt (ที-สเกิ๊ต) released on February 27, 1995
- Team'Sthree (Note: Literally translates to "women's team", also a spoonerism of the group's name.)(ทีมสตรี) released on April 30, 1996

=== Compilation ===
- Ruam Hit Tid Kraprong (รวมฮิตติดกระโปรง) released March 2004
