= Christina Aguilar =

Thai singer (born 1966)

Christina Aguilar คริสติน่า อากีล่าร์
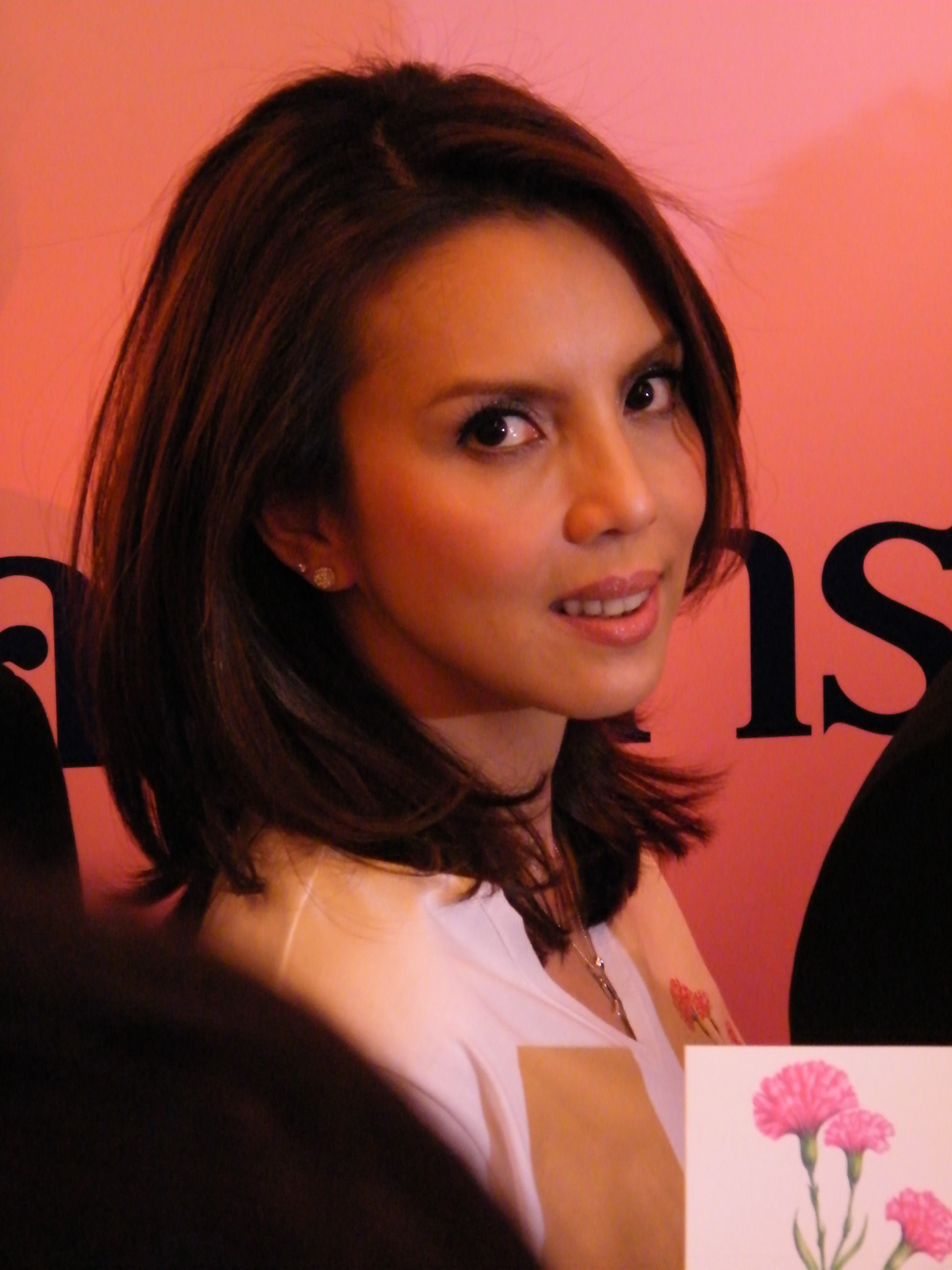
- Aguilar in 2009

Background information
- Born: 31 October 1966 (age 59); Bangkok, Thailand
- Genres: T-pop; dance-pop
- Occupations: Singer; model; actress
- Years active: 1990–present
- Label: GMM Grammy (1990-2011)
- Website: Official website

Christina Aguilar (Thai: คริสติน่า อากีล่าร์; born 31 October 1966) is a Thai singer known as the Thai Queen of Dance. Her debut album Ninja was certified platinum for 1 million copies sold – a first for a Thai female singer. She is also the first and only Thai artist to have their first four studio albums sell over 1 million copies; her third album Red Beat Rahutraun is the best selling female artist's album of all time in Thai music industry, selling 3 million copies. Her eight solo albums have sold over 10.5 million copies (not including special albums). She was awarded at world-class events such as the MTV Video Music Awards, or MTV VMAs, in 1992.

== Early life ==
Christina Aguilar was born in Bangkok to Filipino musician Tony Aguilar and French-Vietnamese mother Margaret. She has two siblings: Anthony and Theresa. Her father was one of her most important music influences and she and her family often sang together.

In 1984, Aguilar entered the Miss Thailand pageant under the name Treejinda Aguilarsakul (Thai: ตรีจินดา อากีลาสกุล) and was among the top 30 finalists, ultimately losing to Savinee Pakaranang.

Aguilar studied at the French Institute, pursuing a bachelor in business management studies in France. She does not have Thai heritage, but sometimes is mistaken for Thai because of her ability to speak fluent Thai. In addition to Thai, Aguilar speaks French, English, and some Spanish. She first became known for her singing abilities while in France. During her college's annual party, she was asked by her friends to perform on stage; she sang "Sweet Memory".

== Career ==
After graduating, Aguilar was recruited by a French advertising agency where she worked as an assistant account executive. She then returned to Thailand and briefly worked in a travel agency. The turning point in her career was when she met Rewat Bhuddhinan, then chief producer for GMM Grammy, who enticed her into the music industry.

=== 1990–1994: Early Success with Ninja and Arwut Lab ===
Aguilar first appeared on radio in 1990. Her debut single "Ninja", taken from her debut album Ninja, became a hit among Thai listeners. It was followed by the release of some other pop dance singles, including "Plik Lock (พลิกล็อค)" and "Prawatsart (ประวัติศาสตร์)", and some ballads, like "Hua Jai Kor Ma (หัวใจขอมา)" and "Plao Rok Na (เปล่าหรอกนะ)". Aguilar broke records by being the first female artist with a million-seller album in Thailand.

Arwut Lab was released in 1992. The video of the album's lead single, "Jing Mai Klua (จริงไม่กลัว)", won the first Asian Viewers Choice Award at the 1992 MTV Video Music Awards In the album's second video, "Wela Mai Chuai Arai (เวลาไม่ช่วยอะไร)", Aguilar costarred with a Chinese-American actor Michael Wong. The album has sold over a million copies, like its predecessor.

=== 1994–1999: Red Beat Rahutraun ===
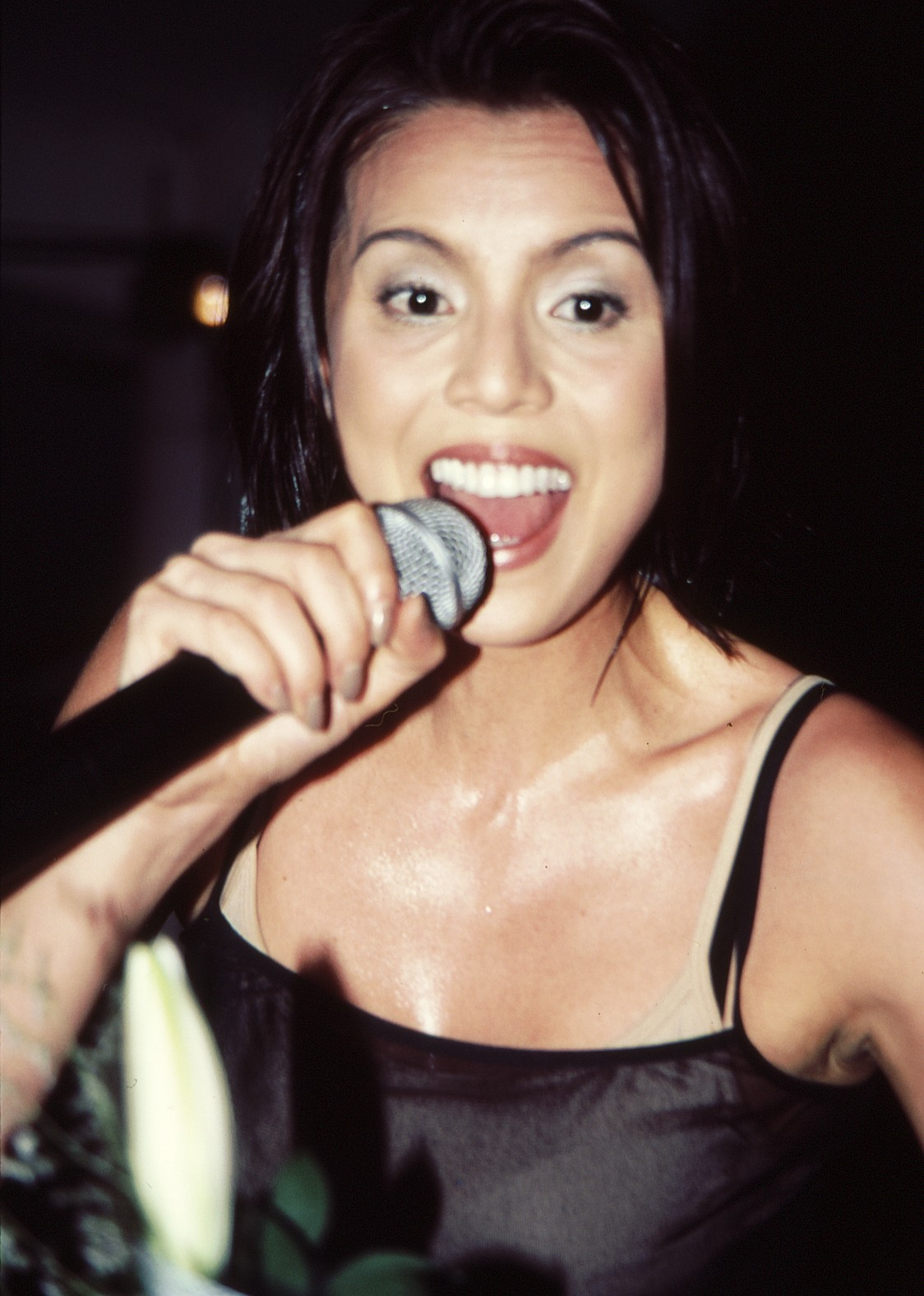
Aguilar performing in Chiang Mai in 1999

In 1994, Aguilar released her third album Red Beat Rahutraun. With a faster beat and a modern and sexy appearance, it became her most successful album to date, containing two of her most successful singles. One is the dance single "Mai Yag Rok (ไม่อยากหรอก)" and the other is the love ballad "Rak Thur Thee Sood (รักเธอที่สุด)". This was the third time that an Aguilar album sold more than one million copies. The album eventually reached the mark of three million copies sold, being the only female album to do so in Thailand. This album also became the third biggest-selling album of all time in Thai music history, only behind two albums of Thongchai McIntyre.

A year later, she was one of five guests of Thailand's most successful singer, Thongchai McIntyre, in the album Khon Nok Gub Dok Mai (Feather and Flowers). She sang with Thongchai in Asanee-Wasan' s Rak Thur Samur (รักเธอเสมอ). In the same year, with other five popular Thai artists at that time, Jetrin Wattanasin, Patipan Pataweekarn, Tata Young, UHT, and Myria Benedetti, she was included on the album 6-2-12. Both albums sold over a million copies.

Golden Eye was released three years later. She came back with a more grown up and mature image. She co-wrote a song named "Tai Pa Hom Oun (ใต้ผ้าห่มอุ่น)" for this album. The album spawned hits such as "Ya Mong Trong Nan (อย่ามองตรงนั้น)", "Fak Kwam Yin Dee (ฝากความยินดี)", "Mai Tong Khob Jai (ไม่ต้องขอบใจ)", "Tai Pa Hom Oun (ใต้ผ้าห่มอุ่น)" and the gay anthem "Pood Eek Thee (พูดอีกที)". Moreover, Golden Eye contains Thai-French lyrics in the song "Bai Mai (ใบไม้)", written by Aguilar. The album was still popular, although it was less successful than her previous efforts; it still sold, however, a million copies like its predecessors.

=== 1999–2002: 5th Avenue, English-language debut and Dancing Queen ===
In 1999, Aguilar explored a younger and more colorful image with her fifth album 5th Avenue. It spawned the hit single "Oon Jai (อุ่นใจ)". It has been sold almost a million copies.

In the same year, Aguilar released her first English-language album. The album features Sarah Jane Fearnley (also known as Fearn), an English singer who sang backup for Spice Girls and on the soundtrack of the movie Evita. This album consists of re-arranged songs in English. However, it was not as successful overseas as her second studio album.

Her sixth album Dancing Queen was released in 2001. It was met with moderate reception. It was the first time Aguilar released a slow ballad as a lead single instead of uptempo one. However, "Kid Pid Kid Mai (คิดผิด คิดใหม่)", has managed to top several radio charts. Due to heavy piracy situation during that time, the album became her smallest-selling album since her debut, selling approximately 670,000 copies.

=== 2003–2007: Paradise and C.Space ===
In 2003, Aguilar released her seventh album, Paradise. The album contained Latin sound. It spawned three singles: "Sawan Yoo Thee Jai (สวรรค์อยู่ที่ใจ)", "Hong Derm (ห้องเดิม)", and "Yak Fung Kum Nun Talod Pai (อยากฟังคำนั้นตลอดไป)". Paradise received well receptions, being sold over 760,000 copies. Four years later, Aguilar released her eighth album C.Space, featuring singles "Koh Khoom Laew", "An Everlasting Love", and "Wang Meed Dai Rue Yung". This was during an important change in Thai music industry when no cassette was released anymore.

=== 2008–present: Live performances and concerts ===
Aguilar has not released any studio albums since C.Space. She has mainly focused on live performances and concerts. In late 2008, she started working on a project, Mai – Tina: Beauty on the Beat, collaborating with Mai Charoenpura. The new single "Burn" was produced and the concert was due on 6 June 2009. In 2010, Aguilar performed with various artists, including Tata Young, Mai Charoenpura, Marsha, Jetrin Wattanasin, and Dan, on a special project called "This Is It, the Concert", a tribute to Michael Jackson, after his death in 2009. It took place on 21 and 22 February 2010 at the Impact Arena in Bangkok.

Aguilar celebrated her 20th career anniversary on 21 December 2010. She held celebratory concerts on 4 and 5 June 2011 at the Royal Paragon Halls and released special celebration single "Sut...Sut (สุด...สุด)"

She has performed in several recurrent concerts of her previous projects, including "6.2.13" and "Kon Nok Kab Dok Mai: The Original Return". She has participated in many contributory concerts, special events and music festivals.

On 21 and 22 May 2016, Aguilar performed in the "Christina Kingdom Concert" as her 25th anniversary.

In 2016, at the "Million Albums Concert" (คอนเสิร์ตล้านตลับ), she performed with various artists including Tata Young, Mai Charoenpura, Myria Benedetti, Beau Sunita, and Nicole Theriault on 7–9 October 2016 at Royal Paragon Hall.

In 2018, Aguilar made her official comeback after seven years with the single "Ter (เธอ)".

In 2023, Aguilar performed in the “Christina Q Concert” on December 9, the biggest solo concert of her career after her debut for 33 years.

In 2024, Aguilar reunited with Bird Thongchai for the special EP "Khon Nok Kab Dok Mai: Dream For Love." She performed two songs, "Rak Ter Tao Rai" and "Lao Soo Kan Fang," alongside Bird Thongchai, Mai Charoenpura, Poo Anchalee, and Lydia. These songs marked her first new releases in six years and her first collaboration with Bird Thongchai in decades.

== Discography ==
Studio albums

- 1990: Ninja
- 1992: Arwut Lab
- 1994: Red Beat Rahutraun
- 1997: Golden Eye
- 1999: 5th Avenue
- 2001: Dancing Queen
- 2003: Paradise
- 2007: C.Space

Non-album singles

- 2011: Sut...Sut (สุด...สุด)
- 2017: Lalaai Lalaai (ละล้ายละลาย)
- 2018: Ter (เธอ)

Compilation, remix and cover albums

- 1991: Mai & Christina: The Greatest Hits
- 1994: 2 Emotions: The Greatest Hits
- 1995: Christina Collection (Japan only)
- 1997: Christina Remix
- 1997: Global Nite Life
- 1998: Christina Big Hit Big Story
- 2000: GRAMMY Superstars Project: Christina
- 2001: THE BEST Selected MOVE & LOVE
- 2004: Real Christina
- 2006: Charming Christina
- 2006: Body Beat
- 2009: Mai & Christina: Beauty Up Beat & Soft Beat
- 2010: Melody of Christina
- 2011: 20th Year Christina
- 2013: FOREVER LOVE HITS by CHRISTINA AGUILAR
- 2014: Best Christina The Original Hits
- 2016: CHRISTINA KINGDOM
- 2018: The Masterpiece Christina Aguilar
- 2024: Christina The Legendary Superstar Series

Special albums

- 1993: Son (10 years anniversary of GMM Gramy) (collaboration album)
- 1995: Khon Nok Gub Dok Mai (Feather and Flowers) (Featured)
- 1995: 6-2-12 (Collaboration album)
- 1996: Prik Khee Noo Gub Moo Ham (Chilli and Ham) Soundtrack (soundtrack)
- 1999: X'TRACK Vol.3 (soundtrack)
- 2000: Christina & Fern (English)
- 2009: Mai & Tina Beauty on the beat
- 2024: Khon Nok Gub Dok Mai: Dream For Love (Featured / EP)
