= World of Music (program) =

Live Thai television program

- World of Music logo variant only featured on the physical set.
- Genre: Live music show
- Presented by: Seksan Phupadit
- Country of origin: Thailand
- Original language: Thai language

Production
- Production company: 72 Promotion

Original release
- Network: Army Television Channel 7
- Release: 1971 – 1974
- Network: Channel 5
- Release: 1974 – December 1996
- Network: iTV
- Release: 1997 – 2000

World of Music, also known as Pop On Stage, (Thai: โลกดนตรี, RTGS: Loke Dontri) was a live Thai television program featuring performances by musical groups and singers. Seksan Phupadit hosted the show, and Boonchai Siripokhasap and his team from "72 Promotion" produced it.

== History ==
In 1971, producing company 72 Promotion, led by Boonchai Siriphoksub, produced the television program "Pop On Stage." The program debuted on the Army Television Channel 7 in black-and-white. During its first decade, the show featured live performances by nightclub bands. As the music industry became systemised, the station allowed artists to perform their recently released albums and songs live. Every performance, done by Thai and some international acts, had to be sung live as lip syncing and backing tapes was forbidden by the station. In 1982, the head of station's programming department issued a policy that every item on Channel 5 use a Thai name. As a result, the program was officially renamed to Loke Dontri, known in English as World of Music. However, the Pop On Stage branding remained in promotional material for years afterwards. At the time, the main competitor for World of Music was Saturday Fun, broadcast on Thai TV Channel 9 and produced by Wichian Aswasiwakul.

In 1983, World of Music began airing every Sunday afternoon, replacing its occasional broadcasts. Every performance had no entry fees, which helped contribute its popularity. Because of the popularity of the program and the growing audience, the studio's transmitting room frequently overcrowded due to its small capacity of 600 people. As the studio faced minor damages, a decision was made to temporarily relocate outside to the station's carpark throughout 1983. In late 1983, a permanent outdoor venue called Loke Dontri Plaza (Lan Loke Dontri) was built behind the television studios. The stage cost over 500,000 baht to build with a 5,000 spectator capacity, becoming a significant investment for the program. On 22 January 1984, The Pink Panther band alongside Nantida Kaewbuasai held the inaugural concert for the new stage. To support fans who could not travel to abroad, World of Music began hosting mobile concerts by the mid 1980s. 72 Promotion would pack their recording and stage equipment and held special broadcasts in rural areas of the country. This included Satun in southern Thailand, and Sao Sao Sao became the last band to perform there under the World of Music program. As a result, the program became one of the most influential musical programs in Thailand, popularising live television concerts and promoting newly released songs. It also played a major role in the growth of Thai pop (T-pop), inspiring later music programs including 7 Color Concert.

The continued rise in popularity eventually made Loke Dontri Plaza redundant in size. In 1994, World of Music was relocated to the Imperial World Department Store.

In 2000, it was last moved to the Bangkok World Trade Centre. The rise of the Internet made it easier for fans to download music than before. Consequently, World of Music ended its airing runs at the end of 2000, when listeners became less interested in attending concerts in person.

== Reception ==
The World of Music was highly successful, attracting thousands of spectators. During concerts held by popular Luk Thung singer Pumpuang Duangjan, the crowd reportedly spilled out onto nearby streets. Retrospective views state that appearing on Loke Dontri was widely seen as being commercially successful in the Thai music industry. As a result, record labels would invest heavily in elaborate stage deigns for their artist.
