= Rap Against Dictatorship =

Thai political hip-hop band

Rap Against Dicatorship
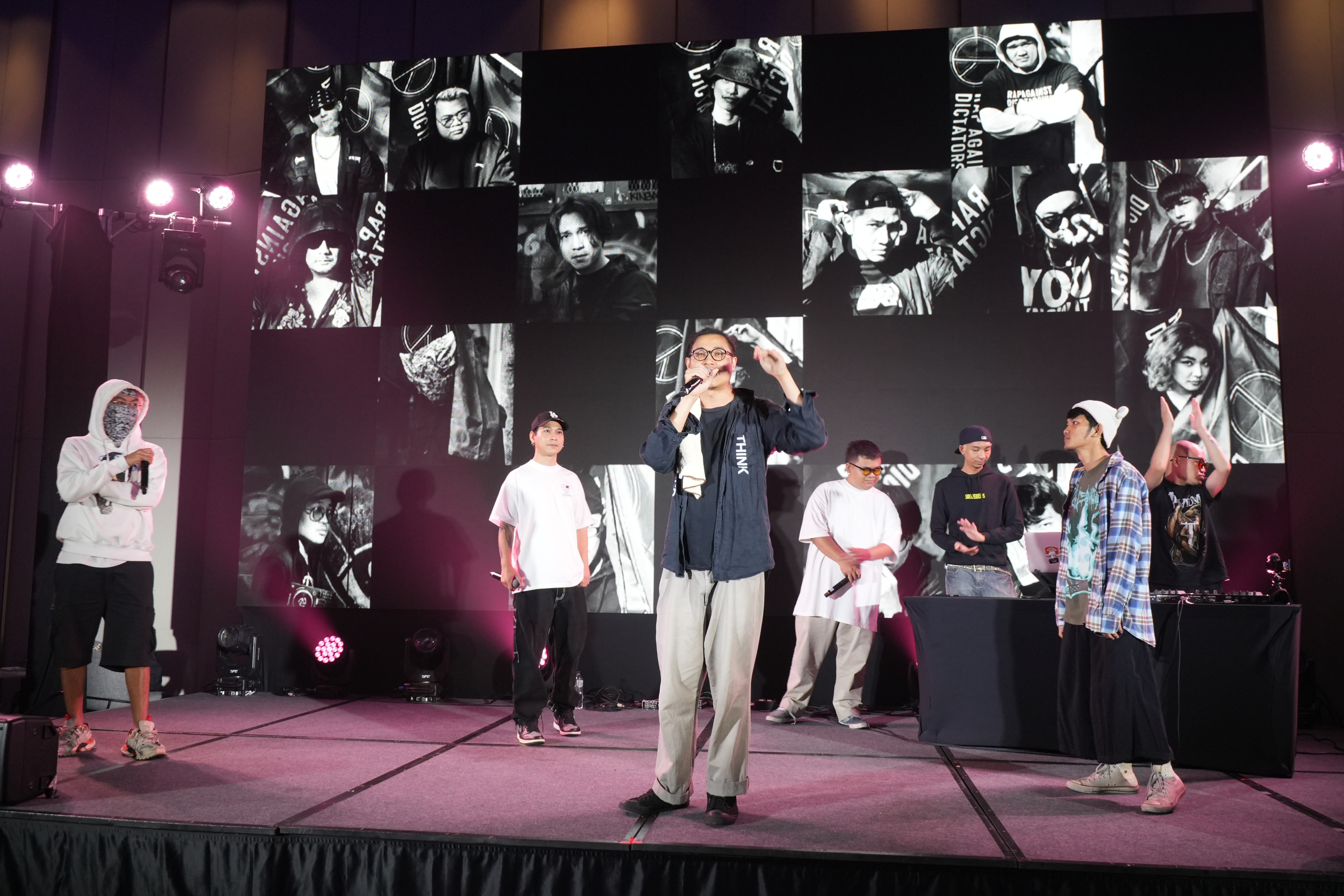
- Rap Against Dictatorship performs on stage at Asia Democracy Assembly 2023

Background information
- Origin: Bangkok, Thailand
- Genres: Thai hip-hop; Political hip-hop; Horrorcore
- Years active: 2017–present
- Members: Liberate P; Jacoboi; E.T.; HOCKHACKER; G-BEAR; K.AGLET; NLHz; Dif Kids; Protozua
- Website: www.youtube.com/channel/UCukIPSb0N6_vRVD_5VlzqQg

Rap Against Dictatorship (RAD) is a Thai political hip-hop group that mainly produces anti-military junta, dictator, and pro-democracy rap music. They were founded in 2017 by the rapper Liberate P. Their first single, "My Country Has" (Thai: ประเทศกูมี), was released in 2018. After the release the police threatened to arrest the members but quickly backed down after the music video went viral. In 2019 they were awarded with the Václav Havel Prize for Creative Dissent at the Oslo Freedom Forum. During the 2020–2021 Thai protests one of the members got arrested together with pro-democracy activists and was charged with sedition. The group's music has been censored in Thailand multiple times due to its anti-government and anti-monarchy message.
