= Dajim =

Thai rapper (born 1977)

Dajim สุวิชชา สุภาวีระ
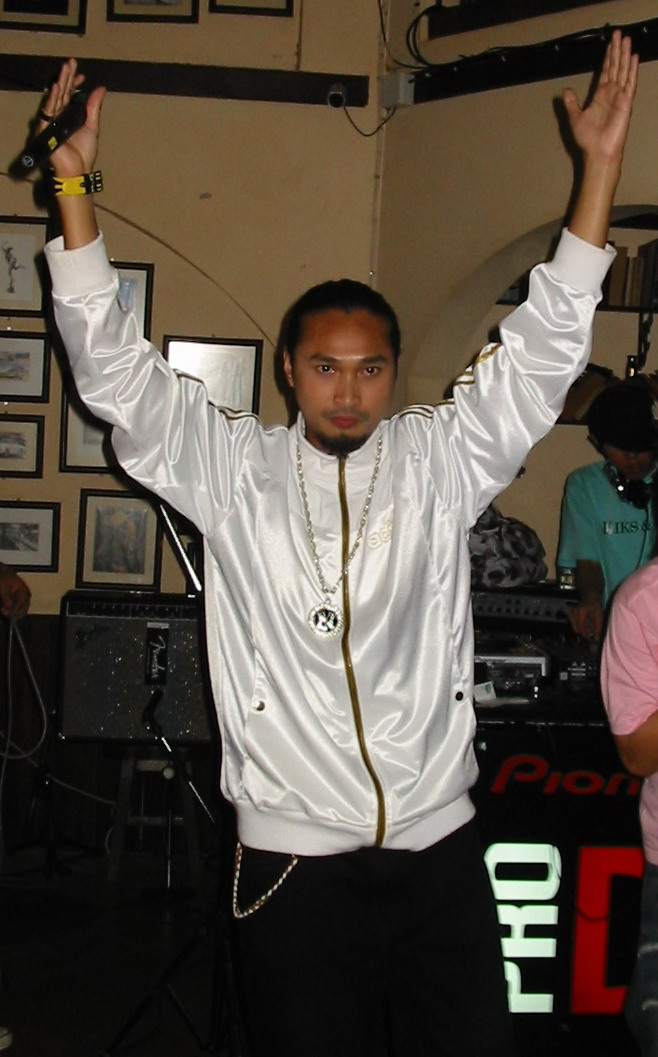

Background information
- Also known as: Dajim (ดาจิม)
- Born: Suwitcha Suphawira; January 15, 1977 (age 49); Bangkok, Thailand
- Genre: Psychedelic hip hop
- Occupations: Singer; lyricist; DJ
- Instrument: Singer
- Years active: 2000–present
- Labels: 2000–2002, 2009: N.Y.U. Club; 2002–2004: Genie Records; 2012–present: Masscotte Entertainment
- Website: Official website

Dajim (Thai: ดาจิม; born Suwitcha Suphawira (Thai: สุวิชชา สุภาวีระ), January 15, 1977) is a Thai hip hop singer and rap artist.

== Biography ==
Before entering the music industry, Dajim worked at his father's video store and as a sales clerk at Tower Records. He later teamed up with his friend DJ Dig-it-all to produce his first album, Hip Hop Underworld and to start an underground record label, N.Y.U. Club. He began working as a DJ on Khao San Road around this time.

Dajim claims that his pseudonym was coined by his managers at Tower Records, comparing his witty nature to comedian Jim Carrey.

== Controversy ==
The offensive content of Dajim's songs led to his arrest in September 2001 under the controversial "social order" policies (Thai: จัดการระเบียบสังคม) of then-Interior Minister Purachai Piumsomboon. In particular, the song Sueak Thammai (Why bother?) (Thai: เสือกทำไม) became something of an anthem for club DJs in protest of new early closure laws, who would blast the song when authorities came to shut them down for the night. As a result, sale of his two independently released albums was forbidden. He joined GMM Grammy's subsidiary label Genie Records in 2002 and released his third album, Rap Thai, that same year.

When his early albums began to resurface for sale at Pantip Plaza and other locations, Dajim was arrested again in April 2002, but he claimed that this distribution was done without his consent or knowledge and was either counterfeit goods or leftover stock of the banned albums.

== Personal life ==
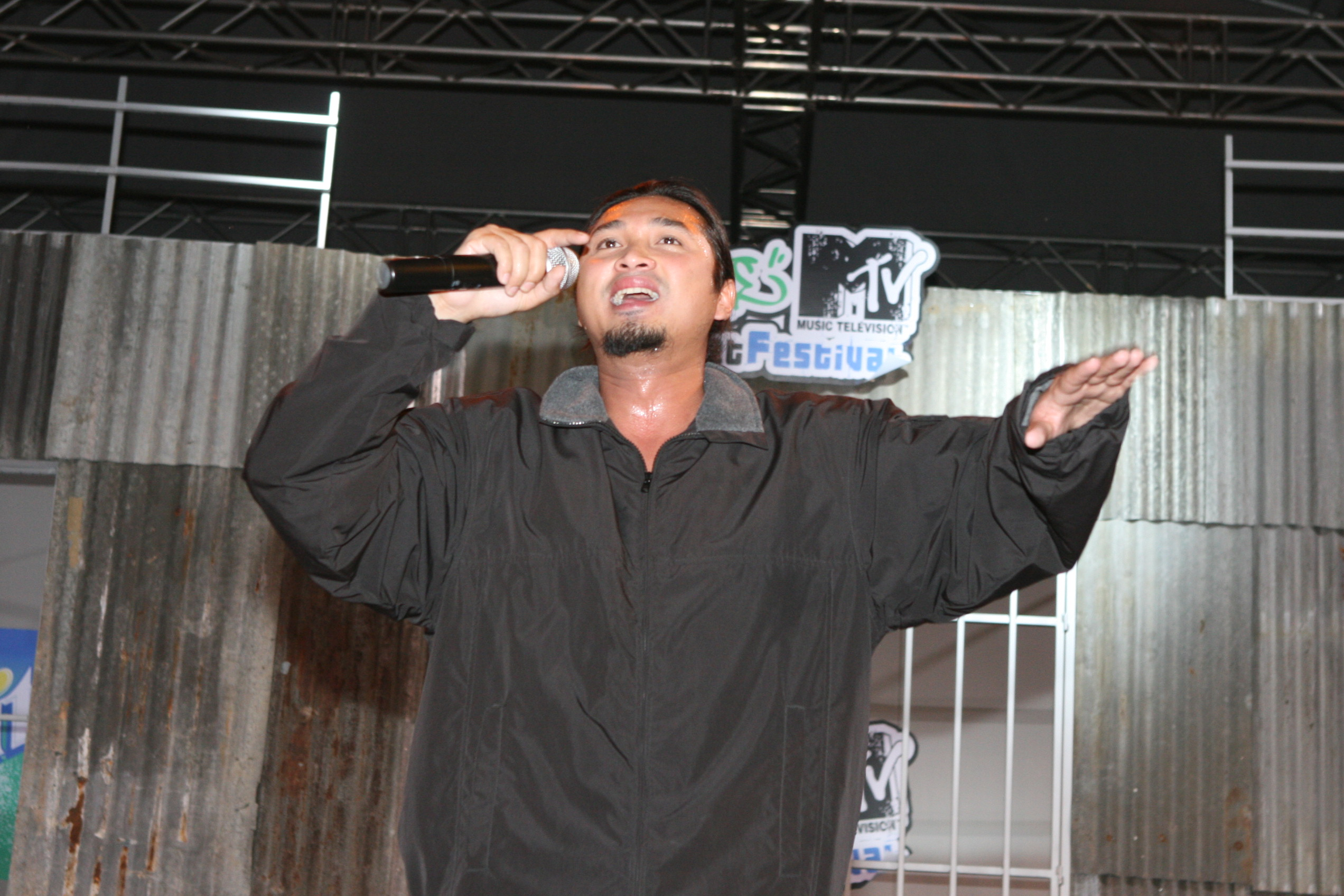
Dajim performing live, 2006

Dajim is best friends with the Swedish singer-songwriter Alea Karin, they met in Bangkok in 2009. She describes him as the big brother she never had.

Although not actively releasing new material at the moment, Dajim still performs live regularly at concerts and appears in collaborative songs with other hip hop artists as a featured guest.

== Discography ==
=== N.Y.U. Club ===
- Hip Hop Under World (2000)
- Hip Hop Above The Law (2001)
- Independence Day (2009)

=== Genie records ===
- Rap Thai (2002)
- Twilight Zone (2003)
- Kik Thua Thai (2005, Thai: กิ๊กทั่วไทย, "Girls all over Thailand")

=== Masscotte Entertainment ===
- Peh Wer (2012, single, Thai: เป๊ะเว่อร์, "On point")
- Kin Lao Mun Khom Kin Nom Dee Kua (2012, single, Thai: กินเหล้ามันขมกินนมดีกว่า, "Booze is bitter, better drink milk")

=== Independent ===
- Taxi BKK (2015, single)
