= Red Beat Rahutraun =

Studio album by Christina Aguilar
- Released: 14 January 1994 (Thailand)
- Genres: T-pop; dance-pop
- Language: Thai
- Label: GMM Grammy
- Producer: Chatree Kongsuwan

Christina Aguilar chronology
| Arwut Lab (1992) | Red Beat Rahutraun (1994) | Golden Eye (1997) |

Singles from Red Beat Rahutraun
- 1. "Mai Yak Rauk" Released: 1993; 2. "Mai Mee Krai Kau Raung" Released: 1994; 3. "Pai Duai Gun Na" Released: 1994; 4. "Rak Thur Thee Sood" Released: 1994; 5. "Yak Hai Roo Lurah Gurn...Wa Chan Sia Jai" Released: 1994; 6. "Lerk Hur" Released: 1994; 7. "Na Thee Thee Ying Yai" Released: 1994

Red Beat Rahutraun (Thai: Red Beat รหัสร้อน, lit. ''Red Beat Hot Code'') is the third studio album by Thai singer Christina Aguilar, released by GMM Grammy on 14 January 1994. It sold over 3.5 million copies, becoming her biggest-selling album. Christina spent nearly two years touring to promote the album. More than a half of the album has been promoted. "Mai Yak Rauk" and "Rak Thur Thee Sood" became her iconic songs. "Mai Mee Krai Kau Raung" has been covered and re-arranged in English for her first English album Christina & Fern.

== Track listing ==
| No. | Title | Writer(s) | Length |
|---|---|---|---|
| 1. | "Mai Yak Rauk" (ไม่ยากหรอก; "It's Not Difficult") | Chakrawut Sawaengphon | 3:54 |
| 2. | "Mai Mee Krai Kau Raung" (ไม่มีใครขอร้อง; "No One Begs") | Chakrawat Phatphiboon; Nitiphong Hornak | 4:54 |
| 3. | "Lerk Hur" (เลิกเหอะ; "Stop") | Atthanop Chansuta | 4:17 |
| 4. | "Lam Bahk Hua Jai" (ลำบากหัวใจ; "Hard Heart") | Waratchaya Phromsathit | 4:31 |
| 5. | "Nah Thee Thee Ying Yai" (นาทีที่ยิ่งใหญ่; "Great Moment") | Surak Suksawee | 4:09 |
| 6. | "Seu Sarn Gun Noi" (สื่อสารกันหน่อย; "Let's Communicate a Bit") | | 2:07 |
| 7. | "Pai Duai Gun Na" (ไปด้วยกันนะ; "Let's Go Together") | Phromsathit | 3:58 |
| 8. | "Yom Pae" (ยอมแพ้; "Surrender") | Suksawee | 3:58 |
| 9. | "Yak Hai Roo Lurah Gurn...Wa Chan Sia Jai" (อยากให้รู้เหลือเกิน...ว่าฉันเสียใจ; "I Want You to Know... That I'm Sorry") | Suksawee | 3:42 |
| 10. | "Ja Pai Jing Reu Plow" (จะไปจริงหรือเปล่า; "Are You Really Going?") | Nawachat | 3:51 |
| 11. | "Rak Thur Thee Sood" (รักเธอที่สุด; "I Love You the Most") | Nim Sifa | 3:48 |
| 12. | "Khai Tow Rai" (ขายเท่าไหร่; "How Much Does It Cost?") | Pracha Phongsuphat | 3:50 |
