= Golden Eye (album) =

Studio album by Christina Aguilar
- Released: 25 September 1997 (Thailand)
- Genres: T-pop; dance-pop
- Length: 40:05
- Language: Thai
- Label: GMM Grammy
- Producers: Dhana Lawasud; Chumpon Supanyo

Christina Aguilar chronology
Red Beat Rahutraun (1994)	Golden Eye (1997)	5th Avenue (1999)

Golden Eye is the fourth studio album by Thai singer Christina Aguilar, released by GMM Grammy on 25 September 1997.Like her previous three releases, the album sold over 1.7 million copies.

== Track listing ==
No.	Title	Length
1.	"Ya Mong Trong Nun" (อย่ามองตรงนั้น; "Don't Look There")	3:58
2.	"Fak Kwam Yin Dee" (ฝากความยินดี; "Congratulate Her")	3:53
3.	"Jab Mat Wai" (จับมัดไว้; "Tie Him Up")	4:26
4.	"Tai Pa Hom Oun" (ใต้ผ้าห่มอุ่น; "Under a Warm Blanket")	3:28
5.	"Pood Eek Thee" (พูดอีกที; "Say It Again")	3:30
6.	"Mai Tong Khob Jai" (ไม่ต้องขอบใจ; "No Need to Thank Me")	4:08
7.	"Rak Kan Yang Diaw Mai Po" (รักกันอย่างเดียวไม่พอ; "Love Alone Is Not Enough")	3:34
8.	"Thur Ou Nai" (เธออยู่ไหน; "Where Are You?")	5:10
9.	"Ou To Thurh Na" (อยู่ต่อเถอะนะ; "Please Stay")	4:01
10.	"Bai Mai" (ใบไม้; "Leaf")	3:56
Total length:		40:05
