= Ninja (album) =

Studio album by Christina Aguilar
- Released: 21 December 1990 (Thailand)
- Genres: T-pop; dance-pop
- Language: Thai
- Label: GMM Grammy
- Producer: Chatree Kongsuwan

Christina Aguilar chronology
Ninja (1990)	Arwut Lab (1992)

Ninja (Thai: นินจา) is the debut studio album by Thai singer Christina Aguilar, released by GMM Grammy on 21 December 1990. It was only the second album by a Thai artist to sell over 1,000,000 copies (the first was by Thongchai McIntyre) and the first album by a Thai female artist to sell 1,000,000 copies. In total, Ninja has sold over 1,900,000 copies in Thailand.

Singles that are still well known are "Ninja", "Prawat Sad (History)", "Plik Lock (Upside Down)", "Plao Rok Na (It isn't)" and "Hau Jai Khor Ma (My Heart Asked for It)".

== Track listing ==
No.	Title	Writer(s)	Length
1.	"Plik Lock" (พลิกล็อก; "Upside Down")	Khet Aran Lertpipat	3:35
2.	"Rohn" (ร้อน; "Hot")	Thaneth Warakulnukroh	4:43
3.	"Ninja" (นินจา)	Lertpipat	3:57
4.	"Plao Rok Na" (เปล่าหรอกนะ; "It Isn't")	Nim Sifa	3:42
5.	"Khun Worapon" (คุณวรพล; "Mr. Worapon")	Annop Chansuta	4:22
6.	"Ya Pai Sie Nam Ta" (อย่าไปเสียน้ำตา; "Don't Wanna Cry")	Nitipong Hornak	3:41
7.	"Khor Kheun" (ขอคืน; "Return It")	Saowaluck Leelabutr	3:48
8.	"Prawat Sad" (ประวัติศาสตร์; "History")	Pramuan Promphong	3:30
9.	"Hua Jai Khor Ma" (หัวใจขอมา; "My Heart Asked for It")	Surak Suksawee	4:24
10.	"Reuang Kao Lao Mai" (เรื่องเก่าเล่าใหม่; "The Same Story")	Chansuta	3:05
11.	"Kham Tham Thee Tong Tob" (คำถามที่ต้องตอบ; "Questions to Answer")	Pracha Phongsuphat	1:33
