= Arwut Lab =

Studio album by Christina Aguilar
- Released: 28 February 1992 (Thailand)
- Genre: T-pop; dance-pop
- Language: Thai
- Label: GMM Grammy
- Producer: Chatree Kongsuwan

Christina Aguilar chronology
Ninja (1990)	Arwut Lab (1992)	Red Beat Rahutraun (1994)

Japan release cover

Arwut Lab (Thai: อาวุธลับ, lit. ''Secret Weapons'') is the second studio album by Thai singer Christina Aguilar, released by GMM Grammy on 28 February 1992. Released two years after her debut album Ninja, it breaks the stereotype that the second album of any artist is/was always unsuccessful; it was as successful as the first. The video clip for "Jing Mai Klua" ("Don't Fear the Truth") won MTV Asian Viewers Choice Award in 1992, marking the second time a Thai artist won such an award. The album sold over 1,200,000 copies in Thailand.

The album was released in Japan by Warner Music Japan on 25 April 1993 as Christina (クリスティーナ, Kurisutīna).

== Track listing ==
No.	Title	Writer(s)	Length
1.	"Jing Mai Klua" (จริงไม่กลัว; "Don't Fear the Truth")	Pracha Phongsuphat	3:32
2.	"Mai Yak Ja Cheua Lei" (ไม่อยากจะเชื่อเลย; "I Can't Believe It")	Opas Pandee	4:32
3.	"Panha Lok Tak" (ปัญหาโลกแตก; "End of the World")	Phongsuphat	3:58
4.	"Wela Mai Chuai Arai" (เวลาไม่ช่วยอะไร; "Time Doesn't Help")	Nim Sifa	3:50
5.	"Rak Tong Mee Anakhot" (รักต้องมีอนาคต; "Love Must Have a Future")	Chakrawut Sawaengphon	3:50
6.	"Khob Khun" (ขอบคุณ; "Thank You")	Surak Suksawee	3:50
7.	"Sia Jai Sia Form" (เสียใจเสียฟอร์ม; "Regret from Losing Form")	Kana Wannakorn	4:14
8.	"Sak Wan Nueng" (สักวันหนึ่ง; "One Day")	Sifa	4:28
9.	"Tham Mai Long" (ทำไม่ลง; "Why Can't I Do It?")	Pandee	4:20
10.	"Ya Hai Tueng Wan Nan Lei" (เอย่าให้ถึงวันนั้นเลย; "Don't Let That Day Come")	Annop Chansuta	3:40
11.	"Khor Hai Chok Dee" (ขอให้โชคดี; "Good Luck")	Sawaengphon	4:20
12.	"Khob Khun Eek Khung" (ขอบคุณอีกครั้ง; "Thank You Again")	Suksawee	2:40
