= Thai pop music =

Genre of popular music in the Thai language

Thai pop
- Other names: String music
- Stylistic origins: Wong shadow; pop; rock; contemporary R&B; hip-hop; dance pop
- Cultural origins: 1960s, Thailand

Other topics
- Phleng phuea chiwit; Phleng Thai sakon; Luk thung

Thai pop (abbreviated as T-pop), is a genre of Thai music roughly equivalent to pop music. It emerged in the 1960s–1980s, during which it was known as string music, before gaining mainstream popularity during the 1990s and has since dominated the Thai music industry. The term is extremely broad, covering Thai rock, dance music, hip hop music and western-influenced popular music in general, though normally excluding the folk and rock-influenced phleng phuea chiwit (songs for life).

The origins of string lie in American R&B, surf-rock artists like The Ventures and Dick Dale, Exotica, rockabilly and country and western brought to Thailand by American and Australian soldiers serving in Vietnam in the late 1950s and early 1960s. It also drew heavily on genres from the British Invasion, including rock and roll, garage rock and Hollywood film soundtracks.

== History ==
=== 1960s: Origin of Thai pop and shadow music ===
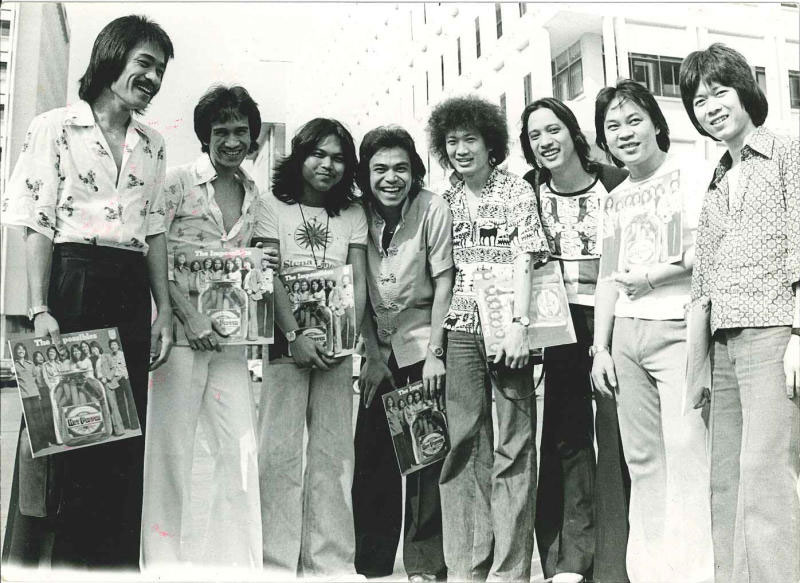
The Impossibles, one of the pioneer of Thai pop music

The foundation of Thai pop was heavily influenced by British and American rock and roll. These early groups gained popularity with Thai youth by playing for US troops during the Vietnam War. These Thai pop groups played a combination of string combo, instrumental music and surf music, which was influenced by bands like The Ventures and The Shadows. This style was locally known as wong shadow (shadow music) and more broadly as string music.

Prominent Thai pop groups from the mid-to-late 1960s included The Impossibles, and PM5.

=== 1970s–1980s: "String music" era ===
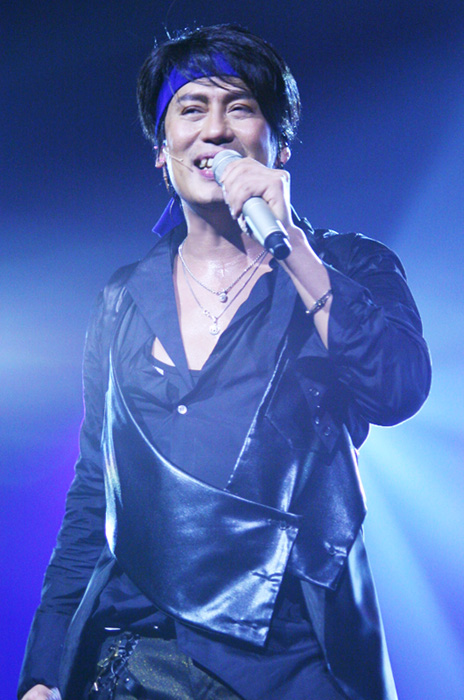
Thongchai McIntyre in 2009

In the 1970s, Thai pop music saw the rise of many record labels and artists. While the Thai population still largely enjoyed traditional genres such as luk krung and luk thung, there was also a surge in interest in Western pop, rock, and folk music.

The disco songs "A-Ba-Ni-Bi" by Izhar Cohen & The Alpha Beta and "Go" by Tina Charles became highly popular in Thailand during the late 1970s and 1980s. Its success inspired local Thai pop bands like Chatree, Grand Ex, Royal Sprites, Pink Panther, The President and Chaliang who came to be labeled as "string" bands.

In the 1980s, following the rise of record labels such as Nititad Promotion, Kita Records, RS Promotion and GMM Grammy, some Thai pop musicians were influenced by new wave, synth-pop, dance-pop, and soft rock. Rewat Buddhinan subsequently became an influential singer-songwriter and one of the key figures in Thai pop music.

The Thai trio Sao Sao Sao rose to fame with their 1983 album Pra Too Jai. Pansak Ransibrahmanakul's debut album, Pai Talay (Go to the Sea), featuring reggae, soul, and R&B influences, was released in 1984 under Nightspot Production, a subsidiary of WEA. The title track, "Pai Talay Gun Dee Gua" ("ไปทะเลกันดีกว่า"), was also the first music video in Thailand to feature a narrative storyline. In the late 1980s, Thongchai McIntyre became one of the most popular singers, reaching the height of his fame during that decade. His debut album, Hat Sai Sai Lom Song Rao (1986), and his second album Sabai Sabai (1987), featured the massively successful hit "Sabai Sabai" ("สบาย สบาย"). Pumpuang Duangjan also enjoyed success as both a Thai pop and luk thung artist. In 1987, the pop group XYZ released their fifth studio album, Nee-Lae-Peuan, which helped the band become one of the most popular pop groups of the 1980s. The album featured the song "Sabai Dee Reu Plao" ("สบายดีหรือเปล่า"), whose melody was borrowed from "Last Christmas" by Wham!. In 1987, Petch Osathanugrah released the hit song "Piang Chai Kon Nee (Mai Chai Poo Wi Set)". The Ovation became widely known after releasing the synth-pop-influenced song "Sai Kern Pai" ("สายเกินไป") in 1987.

=== 1990s: The rise of RS and GMM Grammy in Thai pop ===
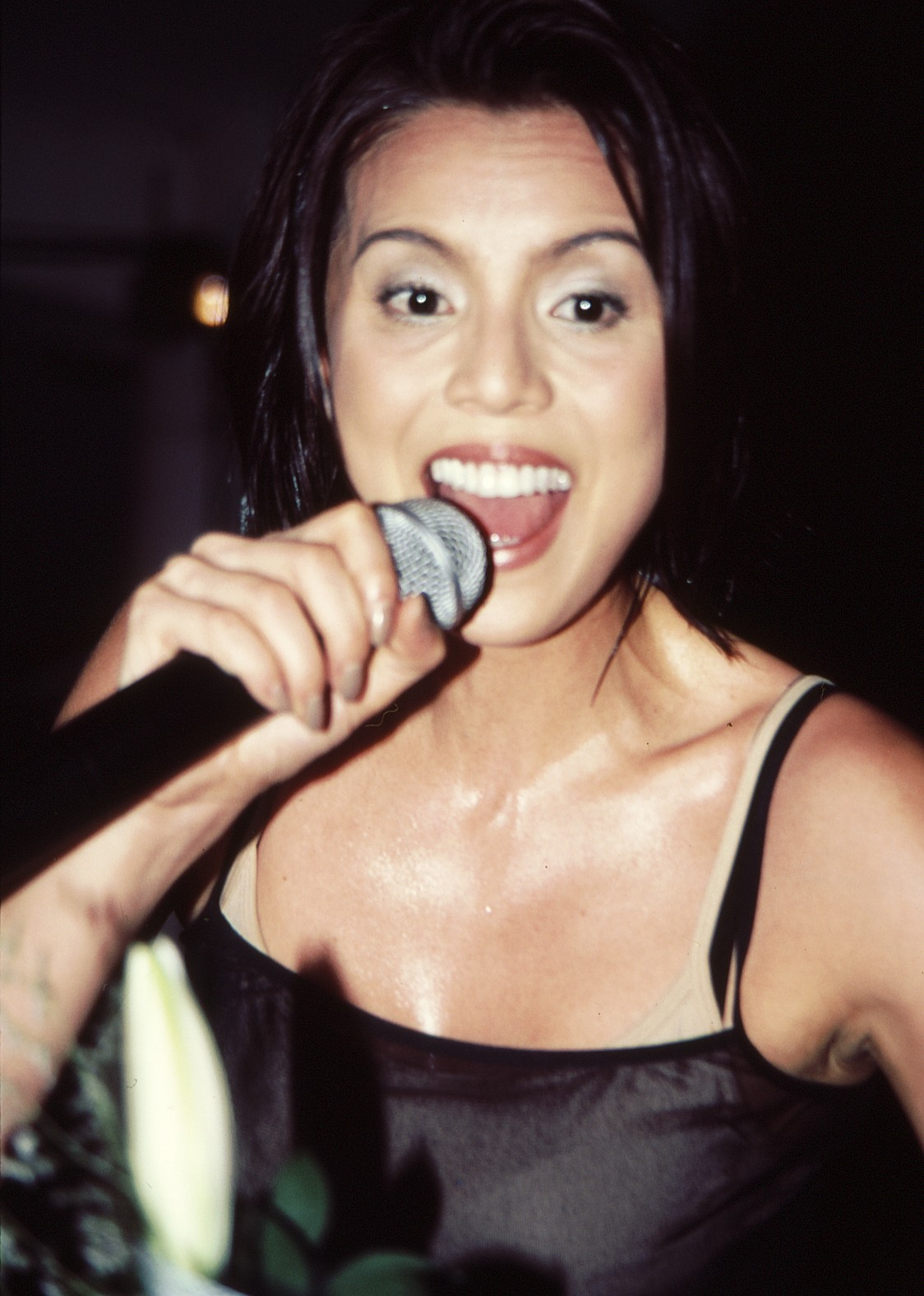
Christina Aguilar in 1999

Starting in the 1990s marked the point when Western-style pop and hip-hop music penetrated the tastes of Thai audiences, leading to more Westernized beats and melodies. The early 1990s also marked the rise of major record labels such as Grammy and RS, alongside a boom in cassette tape and CD sales. Thai pop artists dominated the mainstream in Thailand in the 1990s, including singers such as Touch Na Takuatung, Christina Aguilar, Mos Patiparn, J Jetrin, James Ruangsak, Tao Somchai, Marsha Vadhanapanich and Tata Young. This era also included Thai pop groups such as Lift & Oil, Boy Scout, JR-Voy, Raptor, UHT, Sam-Tone, T-Skirt, Hijack, Dr.Kids and Malila Brazilian.

In the early 1990s, Tik Shiro under Nititad Promotion, achieved major success during that era with the albums Cho Chaiyo (โชะ ไชโย, 1990) and Tem Niaw (เต็มเหนี่ยว, 1992). Christina Aguilar was the first Thai female singer to sell over one million cassette tapes. She remains the only female singer whose first four albums: Ninja (1990), Arwut Lab (1992), Red Beat Rahutraun (1994), and Golden Eye (1997), each sold over one million copies.

Mai Charoenpura released the album Khwam Lap Sut Khop Fa in 1992, under GMM Grammy; it sold 2.6 million copies, making her the first Thai female artist to surpass two million sales and earning her the title "Queen of Pop Rock". The pop group Two released the single “Thoe Mai Khoei Tai” (เธอไม่เคยตาย) in 1993, which became successful among teenage listeners. It is an adaptation of Yoshiki's arrangement of the 1991 song "Say Anything" by X Japan.

In the late 1990s, Nicole Theriault achieved major success with her albums Ka-Po-Lo Club (1998) and Funny Lady (1999), making her GMM Grammy's last female artist to sell more than two million copies during the cassette tape era, before the transition to digital MP3s. Other solo singers and groups such as Beau Sunita, Pookie, Anan Anwar, Pakorn Lam, Bazoo, China Dolls, Zaza and Triumphs Kingdom became popular at the end of the 1990s.

=== 2000s–2010s ===
This era was the transition era from cassette tapes to online music distribution. As a result, T-pop became more widespread than ever. The rise of major record labels like Grammy and RS led to a boom in cassette tape sales, reaching into the millions.

Amid the fierce competition between these two giants, Bakery Music, founded in 1994, emerged as a new creative force that changed the direction of Thai music. While most songs at the time followed simple structures, “Khrai” (“Who”) by Boyd Kosiyabong stood out with its R&B arrangement, more complex composition, jazz-style improvisation, and unexpected key changes — elements rarely heard in Thai pop then.

Not long after, a new culture of listening to music while watching music videos began to emerge with the arrival of Channel [V] Thailand, a 24-hour cable TV music channel that aired Thai, Asian, and international music videos. Before the internet boom, this channel became a gateway for audiences to discover new songs—especially from abroad. However, since it wasn’t broadcast on free TV, international music still remained niche, appealing mainly to a smaller group of listeners.

Around the same period, reality TV shows began to transform the Thai music industry once again. Programs such as True Academy Fantasia and The Star introduced a new level of audience participation — viewers at home could vote directly for their favorite contestants, fostering deeply loyal fan communities.

Each week’s changing performance themes encouraged contestants to reinterpret older songs, bringing classic hits back into the public spotlight and renewing their popularity. These shows became launching pads for many new artists, some of whom rose to fame even without winning the competition.

The fan culture born from these reality programs continued to grow and evolve, eventually intersecting with the rise of J-Pop and K-Pop, which gained prominence around the same time. Among the two, Korean media ultimately became the most dominant, bolstered by the South Korean government’s active investment in its entertainment industry beginning in the late 1990s — a strategic effort that laid the groundwork for the global “K-wave” that would follow.

=== 2010s–2020s ===
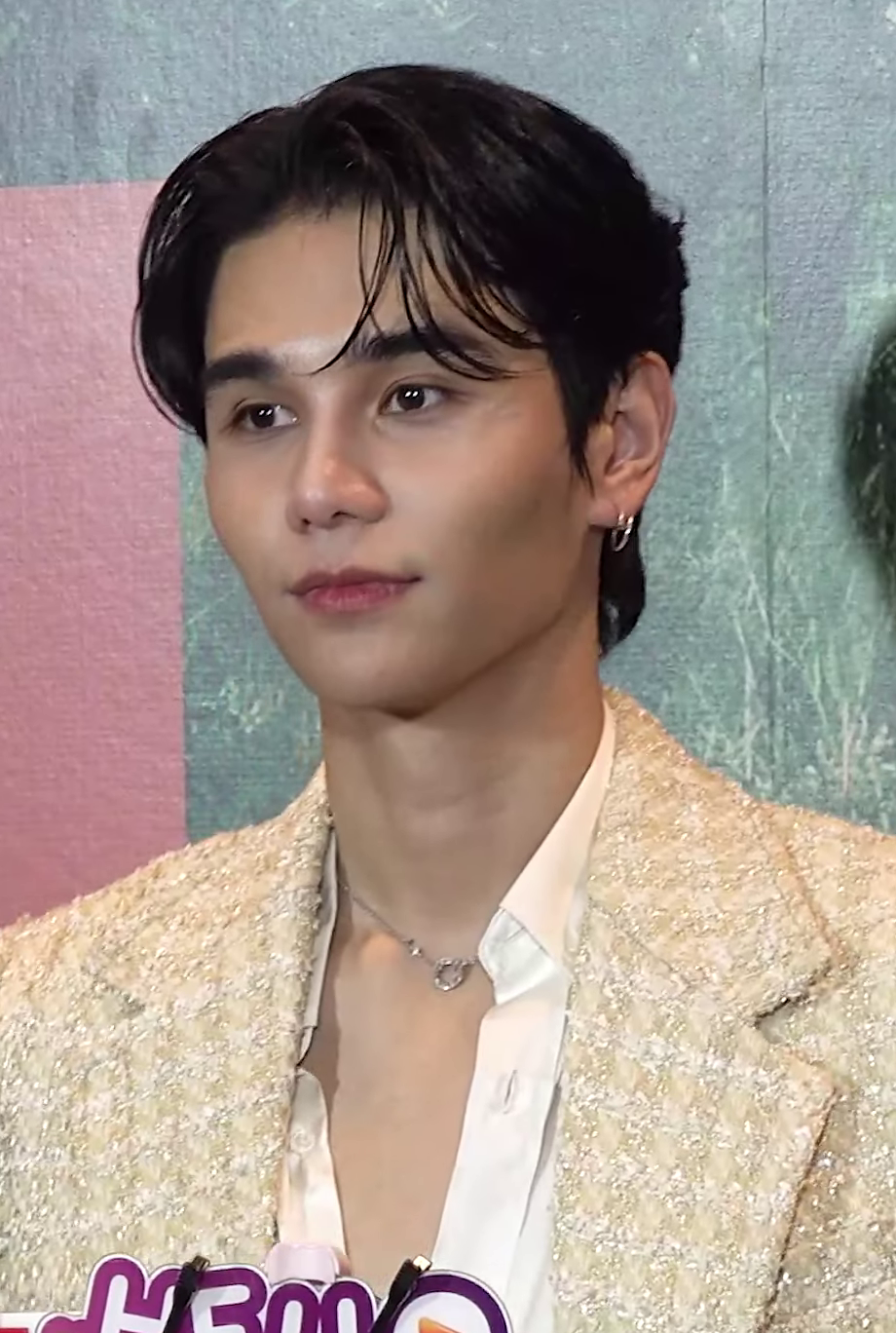
Jeff Satur in Bangkok, July 2024

The success of K-pop groups prompted the creation of many Thai boy and girl groups with increasingly complex choreography as a defining feature. A new cover dance subculture also emerged, where fans imitated idol performances, blending fandom and performance into one. Dance became a key promotional tool, helping songs gain wider recognition. Singers were trained and styled as idols, with their image and choreography as vital to their success as their voices.

One of the most prominent examples of this trend was Kamikaze, a sub-label under RS, which captured the hearts of post-1990s youth with its distinctive, upbeat pop sound. Kamikaze’s style revived the playful energy once seen in earlier Thai bands like Chattri, while aligning with the vibrant aesthetics of contemporary K-pop.

By the early 2010s, T-Pop began adopting similar visual and musical cues — bright, colorful production, English lyric segments, and even rap verses, breaking traditional Thai prosody while staying rhythmically tight.

This era is notable for the acceleration of the Thai music industry as the distribution of music has become much easier with apps such as YouTube, Spotify, and TikTok. T-pop had begun to gain traction internationally with the rise of Thai BL. Numerous girl groups and boy groups have also been inspired by K-pop groups.

The 2022 acclaimed song "Why Don't You Stay" by Jeff Satur for the tv drama series KinnPorsche boosted international popularity of T-pop. Jeff Satur was the first-ever Thai artist to speak and perform at the Grammy Museum in Los Angeles on 3 March 2026.

== T-Wind ==
T-Wind (Thai Wind) is a term used to describe the phenomenon of Thai pop culture internationally. It mirrors the concept of Korean Wave. In the 21st century, Thailand has been exporting many kinds of cultural products overseas, especially in Southeast Asia, such as lakhon (television drama), movies and BL series from GMMTV – GDH and lukkwad-pop (Thai teen pop).

== See also ==
- List of Thai pop artists
- List of Thai girl groups
- Music of Thailand
- Thai rock
- Thai hip hop
