= Pretzelle =

Thai musical group

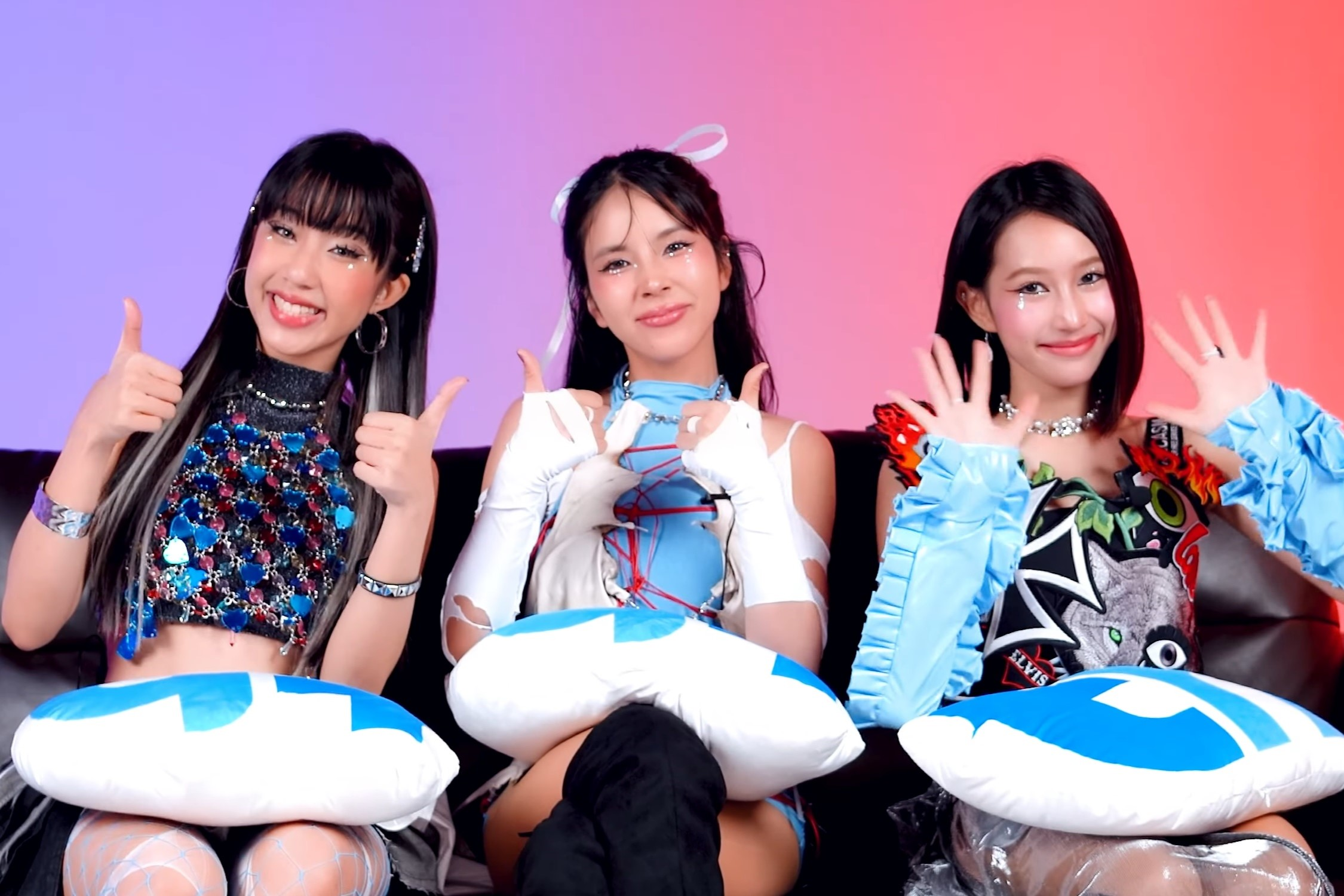
- Pretzelle in 2024

Background information
- Origin: Bangkok, Thailand
- Genres: T-pop; pop
- Years active: 2020–2025
- Label: 54 Entertainment
- Past members: Aunyarin Chaianansopon (AumAim); Mathawee Ratanawijit (Inc); Apisara Chompusri (Grace); Irawadee Sajjaphanitchkul (Ice); Pattaravarin Su (Nana); Kantisha Wibulsamai (BaMee)
- Website: mypretzelle.com

Pretzelle (Thai: เพรทเซล; RTGS: Phretsen; stylized in all caps) was a Thai pop girl group that formed in 2020 and disbanded in 2025.

== Name ==
Pretzelle is based on the word 'pretzel'. The meaning behind the group's name comes from the idea that the infinity shape of the pastry symbolizes happiness and enjoyment.

== History ==
Pretzelle's first performance took place at Thailand's biggest idol group event "Idol Expo #3" which was held on January 30, 2020. The group announced their official debut on May 28, 2020, with the mini-album Pretzelle Day and music video for the first single "Never Give Up" (ไหวมั้ย). The original lineup of Pretzelle included four members: Inc (Mathawee Ratanawijit), Ice (Irawadee Sajjaphanitchkul), Nana (Pattaravarin Su), and Bamee (Kantisha Wibulsamai). The mini-album Pretzelle Day features three tracks: "Never Give Up" (ไหวมั้ย), "I'm Glad" (เมื่อโลกนี้มีเธอ) — the OST for the drama "Leh Game Rak" (เล่ห์เกมรัก), and "Ping Pong Pang Let's Go" — the OST for the Korean KBS1's children show "Teteru".

In July 2020, Nana announced her decision to leave Pretzelle for personal reasons.

PRETZELLE joined Workpoint TV's reality television competition 'Lodi X Next Idol' in November 2020. The group eventually entered the top ten, winning against "Cheesy Pie" a Cm Cafe's girl group. Also, a member — Ice, was named the 'Rising Star' of the competition. During the 3 STAND round, Pretzelle performed their cover version of Yinglee Srijumpol's hit "Your Heart For My Number" (ขอใจแลกเบอร์โทร), scoring 232 points, claiming their rightful place on the top 3 stand.

On January 12, 2021, Pretzelle announced the official departure of Bamee. According to the statement, due to conflicts between her personal matters and responsibility as a Pretzelle member, the group agreed to terminate Bamee's member status. In January 2021, Pretzelle introduced 2 new members: Aumaim (Aunyarin Chaianansopon) and Grace (Apisara Chompusri).

During a live streaming session on February 23, 2021, Pretzelle revealed its official fanclub name, "Twist", taken from the twisting of pretzel dough.

On March 1, 2021, Pretzelle appeared on Workpoint TV's music program "T-POP STAGE", performing their new single "First Love" (ต้องชอบแค่ไหน). Following the successful performance, "First Love" (ต้องชอบแค่ไหน) entered T-POP STAGE's top chart at number 19 for the second week of February 2021, with total points calculated from fan votes, audio stream count, and YouTube view count for ต้องชอบแค่ไหน (First Love) music video

On May 19, 2022, the band released their second mini-album, Ready or Not?

On January 11, 2024, the band released their third mini-album, ORIGINAL.

On May 1, 2025, the band announced that they will disband by mid-June. There were four final activities: the release of the final song "Tha Hai Lok Jai Rai (Letter For My Dear)", the release of the mini album "Cry More Baby", the Fansign event for the album on June 13, and the "Letter From Pretzelle Fancon" on June 14. Upon completion of their last activities, Pretzelle was disbanded.

== Members ==
Pretzelle was composed of three members at the time of disbanding:

- Inc (อิ๊น)
- Aumaim (อุ๋มอิ๋ม)
- Grace (เกรซ)

== Discography ==
=== Mini Albums ===
- Pretzelle Day (2020)
- Ready or Not? (2022)
- ORIGINAL (2024)
- Cry More Baby (2025)

=== Singles ===
- "First Love" (2021)
- "Missin' U" (2021)
- "Ready or Not?" (2022)
- "Baby Boy" (2022)
- "Everytime" (2022)
- "U R Mine" (2023)
- "No Choice" (2023)
- "Mute" (2023)
- "Cry More Baby" (2024)
- "Catch it" (2024)
- "Letter For My Dear (2025)

== Awards ==
Year	Award	Category	Nominated	Result	Ref.
2021	TOTY Music Awards	Female group song	"First Love"	Nominated	
2021	Hallyu Influencer Grand Prize Awards	Overseas Girl Group Popularity Award	Pretzelle	Won	
2022	TOTY Music Awards	Female group song	"Imagine"	Nominated	
2023	TOTY Music Awards	Female group song	"U R Mine"	Nominated	
