= Rod Fai Don Tri =

Record label in Thailand

Rod Fai Don Tri (Music Train)
- Founded: 1979
- Founder: Prasert Pongthananikorn
- Genre: Pop, rock, phleng phuea chiwit, country, luk thung
- Country of origin: Thailand
- Location: Bangkok
- Official website: www.musictrain.co.th

Rod Fai Don Tri or Music Train (Thai: รถไฟดนตรี) is a record label in Thailand, founded in 1979 by Prasert Pongthananikorn, also known as Raya. Pongthananikorn was a well-known former DJ, and his radio show was also called Music Train. After working for a long time at EMI, he resigned to establish his own record label, naming it after the show.

Artists under Rod Fai Don Tri include Sao Sao Sao and Pongsit Kamphee, along with others such as Free Birds, Charas Fuangarom, Phusming Nosavan, Pannida Sevatasai, Chamras Saewataporn, Suchart Chawangkul and Su Bunleang.
