= UHT (band) =

- Genre: Pop • Pop dance T-pop • Dance • R&B • Ballad • Easy listening • Synth pop
- Years active: 1994 – 2005; 2012 – 2013
- Members: Phuthanet Hongmanop; Wuttisit Suebsuwan; Eakkachai Uersungkhomset; Eakkaphop Chantarungsi; Ratthasart Korrasoot; Albert Damon

UHT (Thai: ยูเอชที) was a Thai boy band and male vocal group with 6 members. They first released music in 1994 under Grammy Entertainment and are considered to be Grammy's first boy band and male vocal group.

== History ==
UHT (Under Hood Teenage) was initiated by Rewat Buddhinan in 1994. It is a group of six teenagers who may have previously acted in television dramas or movies.

They released their first album, "Doo Dee Dee Na Puen" and the next album, "UHT Summer Time," in 1996. They returned after a 10-year hiatus with the album "2 U" (2003) and the album "Red Message" the following year.
