= Thai hip-hop =

Hip-hop music made in Thailand

Thai hip hop
- Stylistic origins: Hip hop; Thai pop
- Cultural origins: Mid-1980s, Thailand

Thai hip hop is hip hop music made in Thailand. Thai hip hop is distinguished from American hip hop by not only sound and language, but also by the culture from which the music is made.

== History ==
=== 1980s to late 1990s: Early beginnings ===
The origin of Thai hip hop can be traced back to Thailand in the mid-1980s. "Moo Kang Thong" (หมูแข้งทอง, Moo's Golden Kick) by Mr. Tang Mo (มิสเตอร์แตงโม, real name Pratchaya Srithanyarat), released in 1985, is an electro-funk song credited as the first recording to feature hip-hop performed in the Thai language. However, there were earlier pop records that experimented with rap, such as Thaneth Warakulnukroh's "Buea Kon Bon" (เบื่อคนบ่น), and Rewat Buddhinan's "Mun Plak Dee Na" (มันแปลกดีนะ).

The Thai hip hop scene began in the early 1990s, with artists like Jetrin Wattanasin and Touch Na Takuatung. While they were more representative of Thai pop, the earliest Thai hip hop group, TKO (Technical Knock Out), was signed to KITA Records. Their first album, Original Thai Rap, released in 1993 and produced by Kamol Sukosol Clapp (later one of the founders of Bakery Music), was commercially unsuccessful but helped introduce Thai hip hop, heavily influenced by US hip hop.

Joey Boy's self-titled debut album for Bakery Music, released in 1995, blended hip hop with R&B and reggae influences and became a massive hit on Thai radio stations during the mid-1990s. Due to this milestone, Joey Boy earned the title The Godfather of Thai Hip Hop.

=== Early 2000s-present: The rise of Thai hip-hop, and commercial expansion ===
Rap battles began emerging in Thailand around 2000, although they were not yet as widespread as they are today. They helped produce many hip-hop artists.

In the early 2000s, underground rapper Dajim gained popularity among underground hip-hop listeners. During this era, Joey Boy became the first hip-hop artist to sign with a major label, GMM Grammy. Dajim followed as the second underground artist to sign with a major label, joining GMM Grammy's Genie Records division to release his major-label debut album, Rap Thai.

During the 2000s, rap artists and groups such as Southside, F.Hero, Buddha Bless, and Thaitanium became particularly popular among hip-hop fans. Thaitanium's song "Ta Lueng" became one of the tracks that brought the group its greatest fame. Meanwhile, Buddha Bless's dancehall-inspired song "Fire" is considered the group's breakout hit, which helped establish the band as a nationally recognized act.

Another prominent Thai rapper and singer is Illslick, who gained initial recognition through his mixtapes after winning the S.E.A. Audio Battle in 2006. His popularity surged following the success of his underground single "Jai Rai" (ใจร้าย) featuring Southside, which sampled the instrumental from 2NE1's "It Hurts." Subsequently, he became a household name in the Thai hip-hop scene and has been cited as a major influence on numerous local artists. Although his later work leaned more toward pop and R&B, Illslick was equally known for his diss tracks and gritty lyrics, drawing comparisons to Tupac Shakur.

In 2012, Rap Is Now became Thailand’s best-known and largest rap-battle platform.

Since crossing over into the mainstream in the 2010s, Thai hip hop has become one of the most popular in the internet and streaming era, with artists such as D Gerrard, Youngohm, Younggu, PMC, RachYO, Diamond MQT, and FIIXD.

In 2018, hip-hop became more widely popular, leading to more mainstream televised competitions, including The Rapper and Show Me The Money Thailand. Both programs received both positive and negative reactions, particularly regarding producers’ judging decisions and contestants who emphasized singing rather than rapping.

In mid-2021, "Ton" (ทน) a single of duo Sprite x GUYGEEGEE which is a combination of a reggae and hiphop debut #89 on the Billboard Global.

In September 2021, Lisa of Blackpink released her debut single album Lalisa. The first single, "Lalisa", and the second single, "Money" both charted in the top ten of the Billboard Global 200. It was also her first album to achieve this milestone, making her the first female artist to sell 736,000 copies of an album in its first week in South Korea.

In October 2021, Thai hip-hop musicians F.HERO and Milli released single "Mirror Mirror," featuring Changbin of the South Korean boy group Stray Kids. With the social media app TikTok contributing to the song's international popularity, the music video for "Mirror Mirror" reached 53 million views as of February 2022. Additionally, the female rapper Milli performed at the Coachella Valley Music and Arts Festival in 2022, making her the first Thai solo artist to perform there.

== Politics ==
In October 2018, a 10-member group called Rap Against Dictatorship (RAD) released a song and music video entitled "Prathet Ku Me" ("My Country’s Got..."). A member identifying themselves as Hockhacker explained the song's message, "As artists, we want to reflect the truth of the society we are living in under dictatorship." The song was received well, garnering 47 million views on YouTube (with a like/dislike ratio of 1M : 33,000) before being taken down. The government attempted to ban the song claiming content relating to the Thammasat University massacre violated the nation's Computer Crime Act, threatening to prosecute those who would share or republish the song or video. Blockchain technology was utilized by fans to prevent the government from accessing or deleting the video entirely, and it continued to be shared. A few days later, various police and government officials and spokespeople walked back previous statements and some showed support for expressing a variety of viewpoints.

== See also ==
- Music of Thailand
- Phleng Thai sakon
