= Triumphs Kingdom =

Thai pop duo

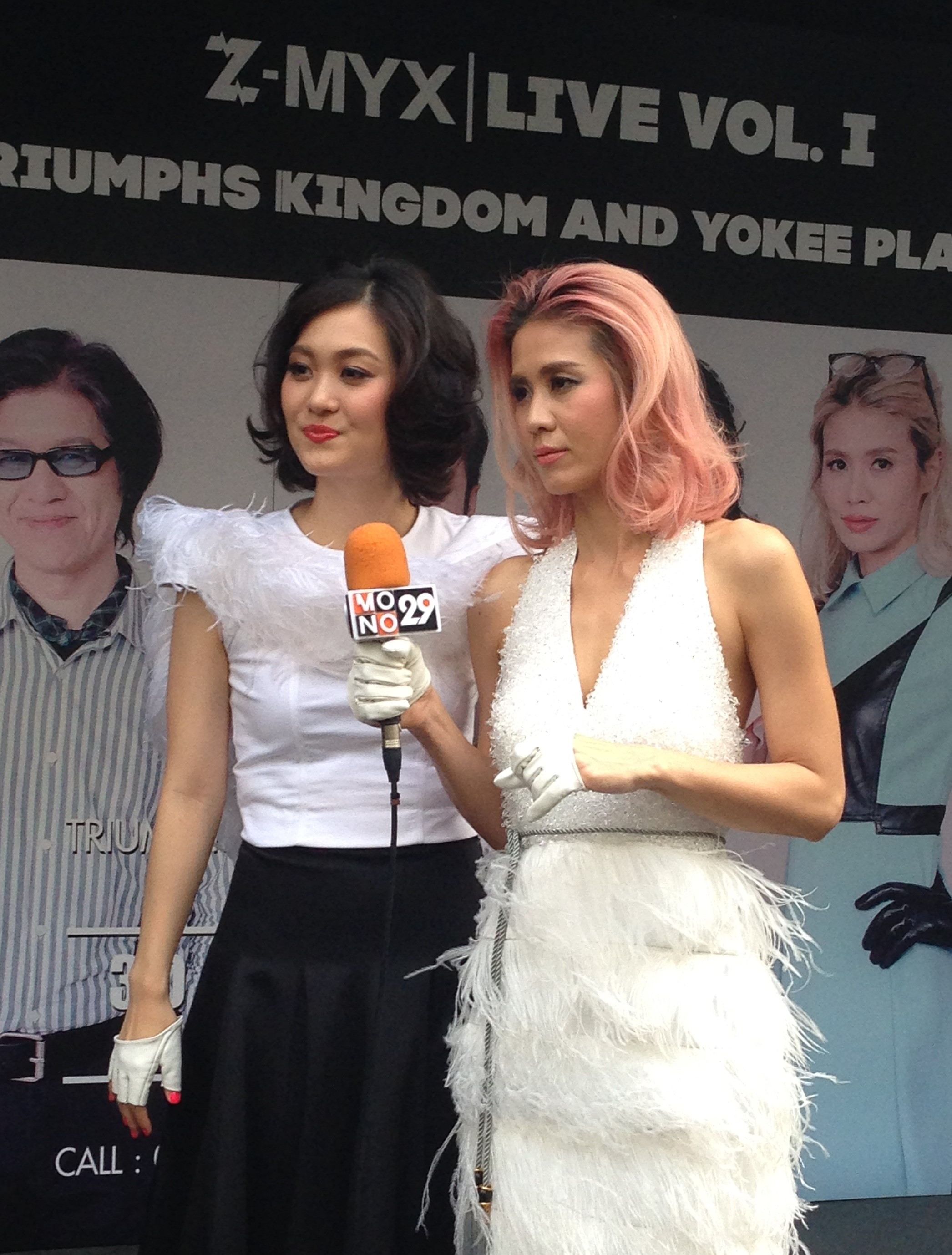
- Triumphs Kingdom in 2015

Background information
- Origin: Bangkok, Thailand
- Genre: Pop
- Years active: 1999–2001; 2004; 2013–present
- Label: Dojo City
- Members: Surattanavee Suwiporn; Koraphatsorn Rattanmethanon

Triumphs Kingdom (Thai: ไทรอัมส์คิงดอม is a Thai pop duo consisting of Surattanavee Suwiporn (Bo) and Koraphatsorn Rattanmethanon (Joyce). The band was formed under Dojo City label in 1999, the duo became one of the most successful female acts in Thailand during the late 1990s and early 2000s and was called as the Y2K band of Thailand.

== History ==
Triumphs Kingdom was formed in 1999 under Dojo City, a subsidiary label of Bakery Music. The duo consisted of Surattanavee Suviporn (Bo) and Kornpassorn Ratanameethanont (Joyce), who were recruited as teenagers by producer Somkiat Ariyachaipanich. The pair debuted on 31 March 1999 with their self-titled album Triumphs Kingdom.

On June 6, 2001, Dojo City held a press conference as part of the Triumphs Kingdom Unzipped event, officially announcing the duo's disbandment. Following this, Bo pursued a solo career under Bakery Music, while Joyce left the entertainment industry due to a drug-related criminal case. She was convicted by the court and sentenced to imprisonment without a suspended sentence.

After Joyce was released from prison, the pair reunited on stage for the first time at the BoydKo Family Christmas Together concert on December 28, 2013, held at Impact Arena.

== Band members ==
- Surattanavee "Joyce" Suwiporn (Thai: กรภัสสรณ์ รัตนเมธานนท์, born on November 17, 1980)
- Koraphatsorn Rattanmethanon (Thai: สุรัตนาวี สุวิพร, born on April 15, 1981)

== Discography ==
=== Triumphs Kingdom (1999) ===
- Ya Khao Chai Chan Phit (อย่าเข้าใจฉันผิด) (1999)
- Di Thoe Na (ดีเถอะนะ) (1999)
- Rak Rak... Rak (รักๆ..รัก) (1999)
- Ya Noi Chai Loei (อย่าน้อยใจเลย) (1999)
- Khu Kan (คู่กัน) (1999)
- Ban Khong Chan (บ้านของฉัน) (1999)
- Thuk Wela (ทุกเวลา) (1999)
- Ya Noi Chai Loei (อย่าน้อยใจเลย) (Pop Version) (1999)
- Ya Khao Chai Phit (อย่าเข้าใจผิด) (Afro & Star Glasses Mix) (1999)
- Rak Rak... Rak (รัก ๆ..รัก) (Love Mix Extended) (1999)

=== Triumphs Kingdom 1.1 (1999) ===
- Khon Khi Ai (คนขี้อาย) (1999)
- Ya Khao Chai Chan Phit (อย่าเข้าใจฉันผิด) (1999)
- Klua (กลัว) (Original Soundtrack) (1999)
- Rak Rak... Rak (รักๆ..รัก) (1999)
- Di Thoe Na (ดีเถอะนะ) (1999)
- Khu Kan (คู่กัน) (1999)
- Ban Khong Chan (บ้านของฉัน) (1999)
- Ya Noi Chai Loei (อย่าน้อยใจเลย) (1999)
- Thuk Wela (ทุกเวลา) (1999)
- Klua (กลัว) (Original Version) (1999)

=== Twice TK - X' Mas Kingdom Version (1999) / Common Version (2000) ===
- Yu Nan Nan Ik Nit (อยู่นานๆอีกนิด) (2001)
- Ngan Liang (งานเลี้ยง) (2001)
- Uan (อ้วน) (2001)
- Pha Chet Na (ผ้าเช็ดหน้า) (2001)
- Ya Tham Chan Rong Hai (อย่าทำฉันร้องไห้) feat. Dear Mom (2001)
- Khon Khi Ngao (คนขี้เหงา) (2001)
- Kan Lae Kan (กันและกัน) (2001)
- Chan Ro Dai Mai (ฉันรอได้ไหม) (2001)
- Khoei (เคย; Used To) (2001)
- Khuen Ni Kho Hom (คืนนี้ขอหอม) (2001)

=== TK Vision (2001) ===
- Thot (ถอด) (2001)
- Lam Buek (ล่ำบึก) (2001)
- Ni Ni (นี่ นี่) (2001)
- Kot (กอด) (2001)
- Ot Chai Mai Dai (อดใจไม่ได้) (2001)
- Khoen (เขิน) (2001)
- Wa Wae (ว้าเหว่) (2001)
- Ham Chai Mai Wai (ห้ามใจไม่ไหว) (2001)
- Mai Mi Arai Rok (ไม่มีอะไรหรอก) (2001)
- Phuea Wa Wan Phrung Ni (เผื่อว่าวันพรุ่งนี้) (2001)
- Thot (ถอด) (Anthem Mix Version) (2001)

=== The Best of TK FOREVER 99–01 (2001) ===
- Forever (Soundtrack "Goal Club") (2002)
- Rak Rak... Rak (รักๆ...รัก) (2002)
- Yu Nan Nan Ik Nit (อยู่นานๆอีกนิด) (2002)
- Ham Chai Mai Wai (ห้ามใจไม่ไหว) (2002)
- Pha Chet Na (ผ้าเช็ดหน้า) (2002)
- Top Thaen (ตอบแทน) (Original Version) (2002)
- Thot (ถอด) (2002)
- Uan (อ้วน) (2002)
- Ya Khao Chai Chan Phit (อย่าเข้าใจฉันผิด) (2002)
- Lam Buek (ล้ำบึ้ก) (2002)
- Top Thaen (ตอบแทน) (Dance Version) (2002)
- Ngan Liang (งานเลี้ยง) (2002)
