= Pretzel syndrome =

Medical Condition

Pretzel syndrome is a rare disorder characterized by skeletal deformity, malformation of the brain (with accompanying seizures), electrolyte imbalances, and variable malformations of the heart and other organs.

It is a single gene disorder but it is complex in its mechanics.

== Symptoms ==
- In affected children studied, the first signs of pretzel syndrome begin during gestation: 80% of mothers have polyhydramnios, extra amniotic fluid around the affected baby.
- The majority of mothers also have preterm labor starting anywhere from 25–38 weeks gestation. The brain is large and malformed in all affected children.
- MRI studies show extra fluid around the brain, or “hydrocephalus.”
- The nerve cells are not positioned properly and probably do not make normal connections with other nerve cells. As a result, seizures begin early in life and are often difficult to treat.
- Mental development is severely delayed.
- The muscles are thin and weaker than normal. The combination of low muscle tone and abnormal connective tissue results in very flexible joints and allows children to twist themselves into unusual “pretzel-like” postures.
- Like other muscles of the body, those that control the eyes are also weak, and about 40% of affected children have strabismus or “lazy eye.”
- Approximately one third of the affected children have anatomical heart defects. The most common is atrial septal defect--a hole between the two upper chambers of the heart. This defect typically does not cause symptoms of heart failure early in life, but can become problematic later in childhood.
- In 20-30% of affected children, there is a buildup of calcium deposits in the kidneys, which then lose the ability to conserve water for the body. This condition, called diabetes insipidus, causes children to urinate frequently.

== Genetics ==
The defective gene is called LYK5. It has a complicated function that is only partly understood. The LYK5 gene product is part of a chemical “relay” or “messaging” system that controls the growth and function of many cells in the body.

In Pretzel syndrome, part of the LYK5 gene is missing, which leads to a complete loss of this signaling function. The LYK5 gene has an important role in normal organ development. Defective organ development that begins during the earliest stages of pregnancy is not treatable and leads to a variety of medical problems throughout life.

== Treatment ==
Although the organ defects caused by LYK5 deficiency can not be prevented or reversed, Pretzel syndrome can nonetheless be treated by recognizing problems such as seizures, strabismus, diabetes insipidus, and heart defects, and treating these problems appropriately to optimize the health and well-being of the child.

- Children with strabismus should be treated by a pediatric eye doctor to prevent permanent loss of vision.
- Children with diabetes insipidus should be allowed to drink freely to prevent severe dehydration.

== Etymology ==
Pretzel syndrome is named for the characteristic body posture adopted by many affected children.

== See also ==
- Single gene disorders
- List of genetic disorders
- medical genetics
