= Sao Sao Sao =

Thai pop trio

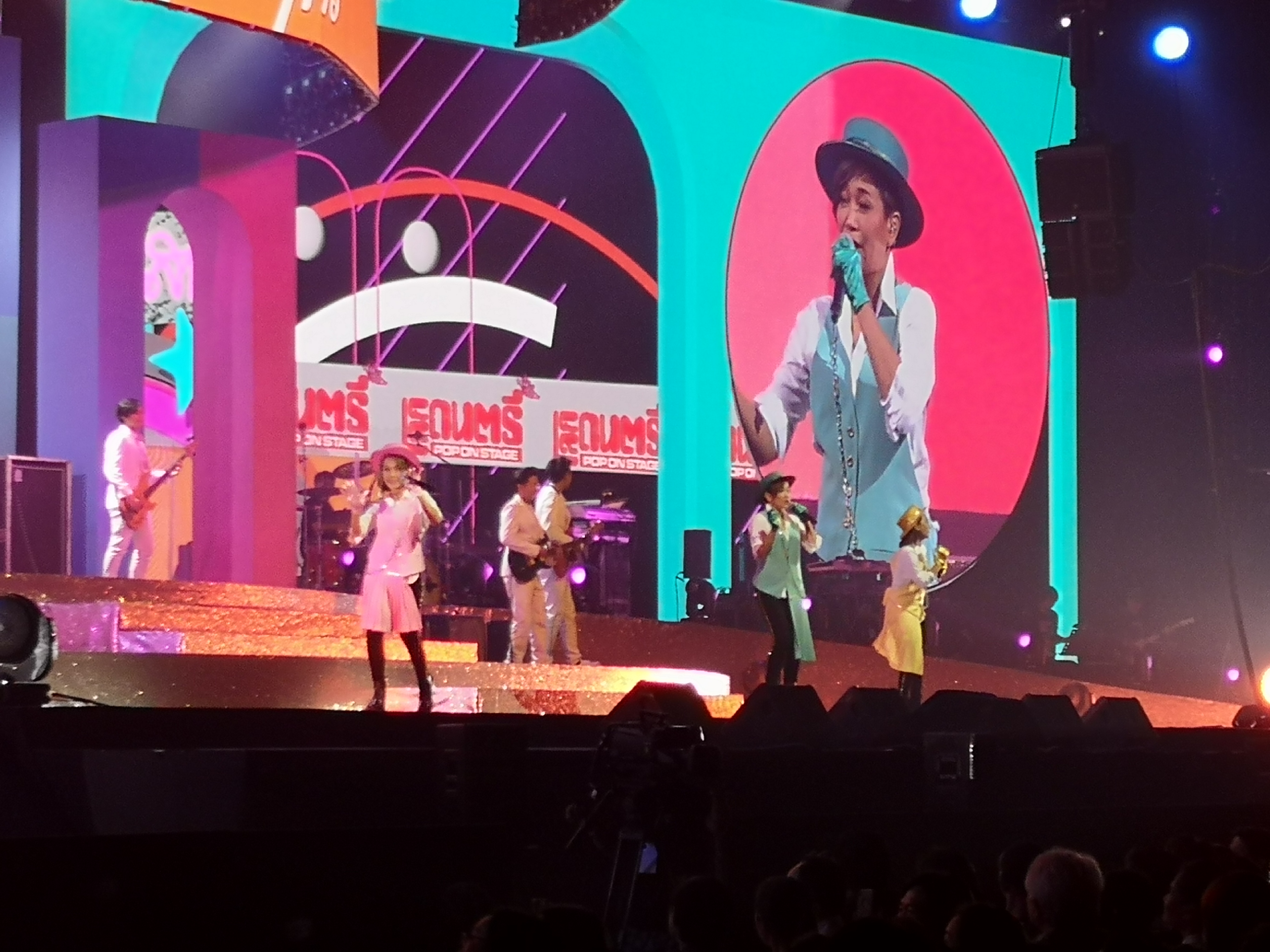
- Sao Sao Sao performing at Paragon Hall, Siam Paragon, in 2018.

Background information
- Origin: Bangkok, Thailand
- Genre: Pop
- Years active: 1981–1990; 2011–present
- Label: Rod Fai Don Tri
- Members: Saowaluk Leelaboot; Patcharida Wattana; Orawan Yenpoonsuk
- Website: www.saosaosao.com

Sao Sao Sao (Thai: สาว สาว สาว; lit. 'Girl Girl Girl') is a Thai pop trio consisting of Saowaluk Leelaboot (Amp), Patcharida Wattana (Mam), and Orawan Yenpoonsuk (Pum). They are recognized as Thailand's first girl group. Their debut album, Rak Pug Jai, released in 1982 when they were teenagers, was not successful, but they rose to stardom with their 1983 album Pra Too Jai. Their popularity surged after performing at the Pop On Stage live concert, which aired in 1983. After disbanding in 1990 due to diminishing sales and the members' growing older, Sao Sao Sao reunited in 2011 for live concerts and TV appearances.

The 1983 song "Pra Too Jai" was later featured on the soundtrack of the 2003 film Fan Chan, which helped bring greater attention to Sao Sao Sao.

== History ==
Before formally becoming a group, the members of Sao Sao Sao first performed together in public in 1977 at Music Square of Channel 3.

In 1981, Prasert Pongthananikorn (also known as Raya), the founder of record label Rod Fai Don Tri (Music Train), sought to establish a new girl group for the label. He consulted Wirat Yoothaworn, manager of the Siam Yamaha Music School, to find new singers. The school introduced Chantana Kitiyaphan's daughter Saowaluk, niece Orawan, and Suda Chunbarn's daughter Patcharida, and arranged for them to debut in Music Train's girl group. They received the nicknames Amp, Pum, and Mam, respectively.

Sao Sao Sao recorded their first album, Ruk Puk Jai, in 1981 and released it in 1982. The album sold poorly because the music was considered too outdated for the age of the members. In 1983, they released their second album, Pra Tu Jai. This album was more successful, selling 300,000 copies. It was followed in 1984 with Pen Fan Gun Dai Yung Ngai, which became their best-selling release with 400,000 copies.

The group's first foreign language album, Because I Love You, was released in 1987, featuring English and Japanese songs. Their 1988 album Wow..w! marked a drastic shift in Sao Sao Sao's style, and was a commercial failure, selling fewer than 10,000 copies. That same year they made their second foreign language album, Together, which was also unsuccessful.

In 1990 the members of Sao Sao Sao decided to disband to pursue higher education, and because of their ages. Their final album, Dok Mai Khong Nam Jai, was released that year, featuring a bilingual song (Dokmai khong namjai) with Thai and Japanese lyrics. Sao Sao Sao disbanded soon after. Following disbandment, Amp signed to GMM Grammy as a songwriter and singer. Mam and Pum also worked as RS's singer trainers, but stopped in favor of pursuing their own business.

== Band members ==
- Orawan "Pum" Yenpoonsuk（Thai: อรวรรณ เย็นพูนสุข, born on 7 September 1964）
- Saowaluk "Amp" Leelaboot（Thai: เสาวลักษณ์ ลีละบุตร, born on 13 May 1965）
- Patcharida "Mam" Wattana（Thai: พัชริดา วัฒนา, born on 14 October 1967）

== Discography ==
=== Album ===
- Rak Pug Jai (รักปักใจ) (1982)
- Pra Too Jai (ประตูใจ) (1983)
- Pen Fan Gun Dai Young Ngai (เป็นแฟนกันได้ยังไง) (1984)
- Ha Khon Ruam Fun (หาคนร่วมฝัน) (1984)
- Nai Wai Rien (ในวัยเรียน) (1985)
- Mak Mai Lae Sai Tarn (แมกไม้และสายธาร) (1986)
- Because I Love You (1987)
- Wow..w! (ว้าว..ว!) (1988)
- Together (1988)
- Dokmai Kong Narm Jai (ดอกไม้ของน้ำใจ) (1990)
