= Kita Records =

Thai record label

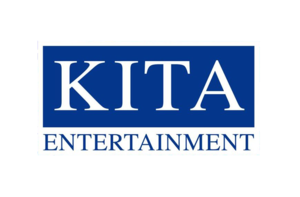
- The logo during the Kita Entertainment era
- Founded: October 24, 1986

Kita Records (Thai: คีตา เรคคอร์ดส) was a former record label in Thailand, founded on October 24, 1986 by three personnel from JSL Company Limited, namely Sompong Wannapinyo, Lawan Chupinit or Kanchat and Chamnan Asadamongkol or Siritan and also Worachai Thammasangkiti from Metro Records and Tapes and Prapas Cholsaranon as partners managed by Sompong and Prapas. At that time, the company used the name Kita Records and Tapes Co., Ltd. with an hourglass as company symbol. The label's first album, released in January 1987, was Seksan Chaicharoen's Walking Melody album (ดนตรีออกเดิน), and the company's first office was located at the Siam Condominium building before moving to Active Studio of JSL at the beginning year of 1987.

In early October 1989, Kita spun off from JSL to manage itself and relocated the company's office to Soi Soonvijai 2 near Rota Group, which produces tapes and records for Kita along with changing the name to Kita Records Company Limited, still managed by Sompong and Prapas, both of them also co-founding Workpoint Entertainment Co., Ltd. together with Phanya Nirunkul, who also resigned from JSL.

Later, Somphong and Prapas decided to sell Kita to Saengchai Apichartworapong, with Sompong resigning from Workpoint to establish TV Thunder Company Limited (later listed on the stock exchange and changed its name to TV Thunder Public Company Limited). Prapas to came out and founded his own record label called Muser Records, but also executive Workpoint before deciding to sell Muser to Warner Music Thailand to take over and went back to executive the Workpoint company as before.

Saengchai has decided to change the company's name again to Kita Entertainment Co., Ltd. along with changing the company's music-making policy to be a teenage record label. Subsequently, Saengchai decided to sell the company to Wirot Prichawongwaikul of Onpa Company and Paiwong Techanarong of Bonanza Khao Yai to continue management and changed the company name again to Kita Music Company Limited, but soon the business was closed down permanently, by all music copyrights was of Right Beyond Company Limited in the ONPA group.
