= Paulina Tamayo =

Ecuadorian singer (1965–2025)

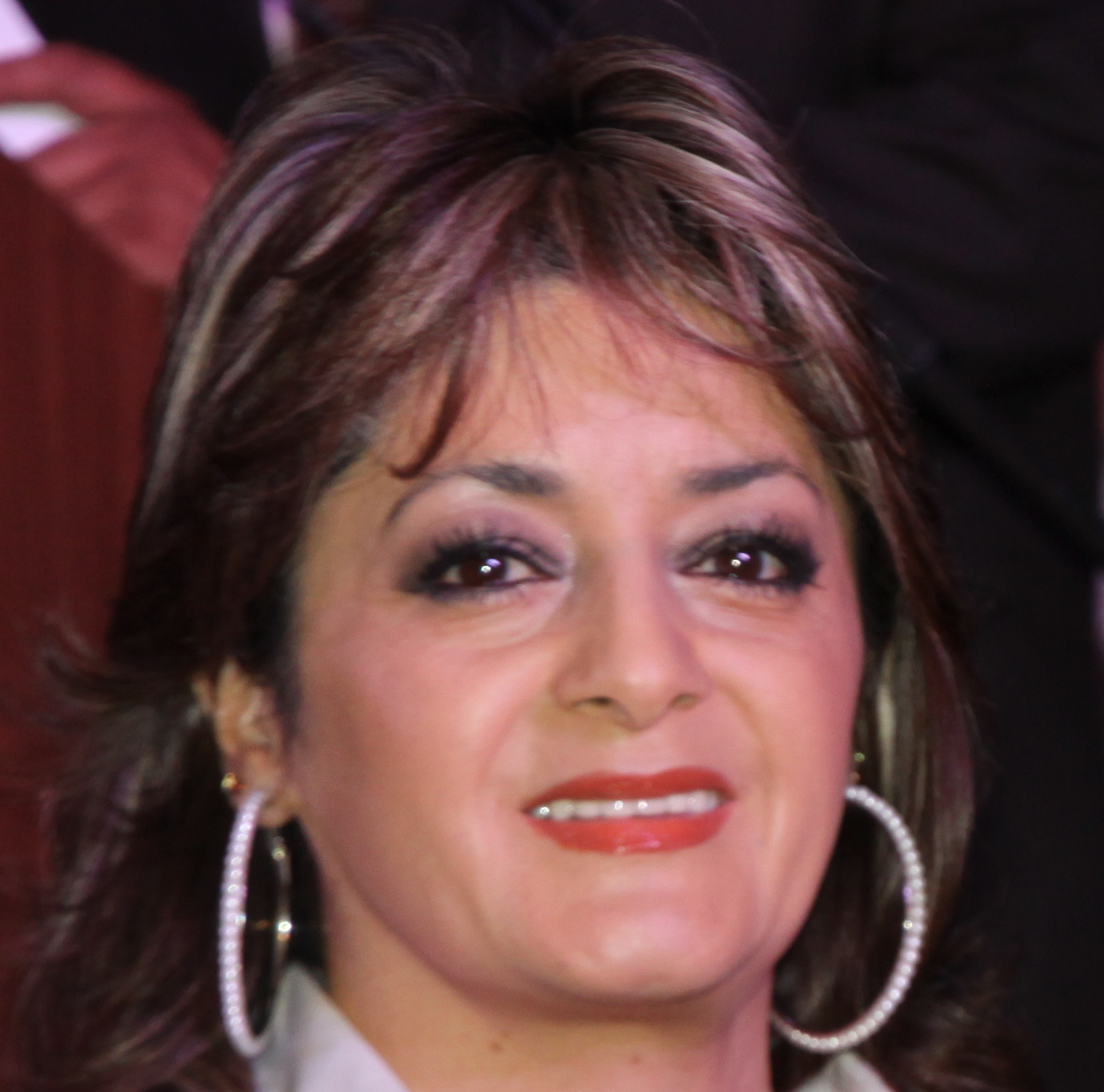
- Tamayo in 2011

Background information
- Born: 14 April 1965; Quito, Ecuador
- Died: 21 October 2025 (aged 60)
- Genres: Pasillo
- Occupation: Singer
- Instrument: Vocals
- Award: Matilde Hidalgo Prize (2017)

Paulina de las Mercedes Tamayo Cevallos (14 April 1965 – 21 October 2025) was an Ecuadorian singer. She began performing during her childhood, winning a festival in Venezuela, and she composed several songs and albums. Her work included a diverse range of genres, several of which were from Ecuador.

== Early life ==
Paulina de las Mercedes Tamayo was born on 14 April 1965 in Quito. She was the daughter of Quito native Fausto Tamayo and Loja native María Luisa Cevallos Paladines, who composed some of her early songs. Her great-uncle was composer Víctor Valencia Nieto. During her youth, Ecuadorian music was regularly heard in her home, especially that of the Dúo Benítez-Valencia and Fresia Saavedra, whom she credited as influences that shaped her childhood. In 2023, she obtained a degree in Musical and Sound Arts from the University of the Hemispheres.

== Career ==
Tamayo began singing at the age of five, when she won the Rumichaca de Oro festival Tulcán, performing the pasillo song "Entrega final". At the age of six, she joined the theater company of actor Ernesto Albán, with whom she worked for several years. At the age of nine, she performed at the Ecuadorian Embassy in Lima, Peru; she later recalled receiving congratulations from Peruvian singer Chabuca Granda for her performance of the Víctor Nieto pasillo "Rebeldía". She won the 1977 Latin American Youth Festival, held in Acarigua, Venezuela; Fabricio Salazar of El Diario said: "During her childhood and youth, she represented Ecuador on multiple international stages, always carrying with her the essence of national folklore."

Tamayo's first album, Colección de Oro, which was followed by other releases on vinyl and CD. Although she recorded 15 albums, she often stated that she preferred direct contact with the public to a prolific discography. Her work included Ecuadorian genres like pasillos, albazos, bomba, pasacalles, and sanjuanitos. Her work also includes two songs dedicated to football teams: "Bi-Tri yo te canto" (2018), dedicated to C.D. El Nacional (of which she was a fan) and co-composed with her son Willie Tamayo, and "Soy del Auquitas, guambrito" (2023), dedicated to S.D. Aucas. In 2025, she recorded the pasillo "Sombras", a duet with Peruvian singer Eva Ayllón.

Throughout her career, Tamayo performed outside the country and shared the stage with artists such as Roberto Carlos, Rocío Dúrcal, Lola Flores, Juan Gabriel, Julio Jaramillo, Los Panchos, and Los Visconti. In April 2011, she held a celebratory concert at the Agora of the Casa de la Cultura Ecuatoriana in Quito. In addition to South American countries, she performed in Mexico, Canada, and the United States. She was also close to the Ecuadoran diaspora, including in Spain and the United States. She won the 2017 Matilde Hidalgo Prize and the 2018 Carlota Jaramillo National Prize for Cultural Merit.

Tamayo also appeared as a judge at the musical reality show Yo me llamo. She also ventured in business, including a boutique and perfume.

== Death ==
Tamayo died on 21 October 2025 of respiratory failure at the age of 60. Her wake was held at the National Theater of the Casa de la Cultura Ecuatoriana, and her funeral took place at the Basílica del Voto Nacional. Her remains were cremated and interred in Monteolivo Norte Cemetery.
