= Culture of Ecuador =

Ecuador is a multicultural and multiethnic nation, with the majority of its population is descended from a mixture of both European and Amerindian ancestry. The other 10% of Ecuador's population originate east of the Atlantic Ocean, predominantly from Spain, Italy, Lebanon, France and Germany. Around the Esmeraldas and Chota regions, the African influence would be strong among the small population of Afro-Ecuadorians that account for no more than 10%. Close to 80% of Ecuadorians are Roman Catholic, although the indigenous population blend Christian beliefs with ancient indigenous customs. The racial makeup of Ecuador is 70% mestizo (mixed Amerindian and white), 7% Amerindian, 12% White, and 11% Black.

Ecuador can be split up into four geographically distinct areas; the Costa (coast), the Sierra (highlands), El Oriente (the east; which includes the Amazonic region) and the Galápagos Islands.

There is tension and general dislike between the residents of the highlands Quito and the coast Guayaquil the two largest cities of the country. Centralism in these two cities, also creates animus from neighboring provinces. The at times extreme cultural differences between the Coast and the Mountainous Regions can be traced back to pre-hispanic times as the Sierra had a strong Incan presence whereas the Coast was sparsely populated by non-Incan populations such as the Valdivia, Moche, etc. Post colonization the regionalism was accentuated and perpetuated, with the Coast having more Pan-European and African influences and the Sierra having strictly Indigenous influences. The animosity between the two regions has effectively bifurcated the country into two distinct ethnic consciousness and national identities. The enmity between the regions has often detained national economic progress as development in one region or the other is viewed with chagrin.

== History ==
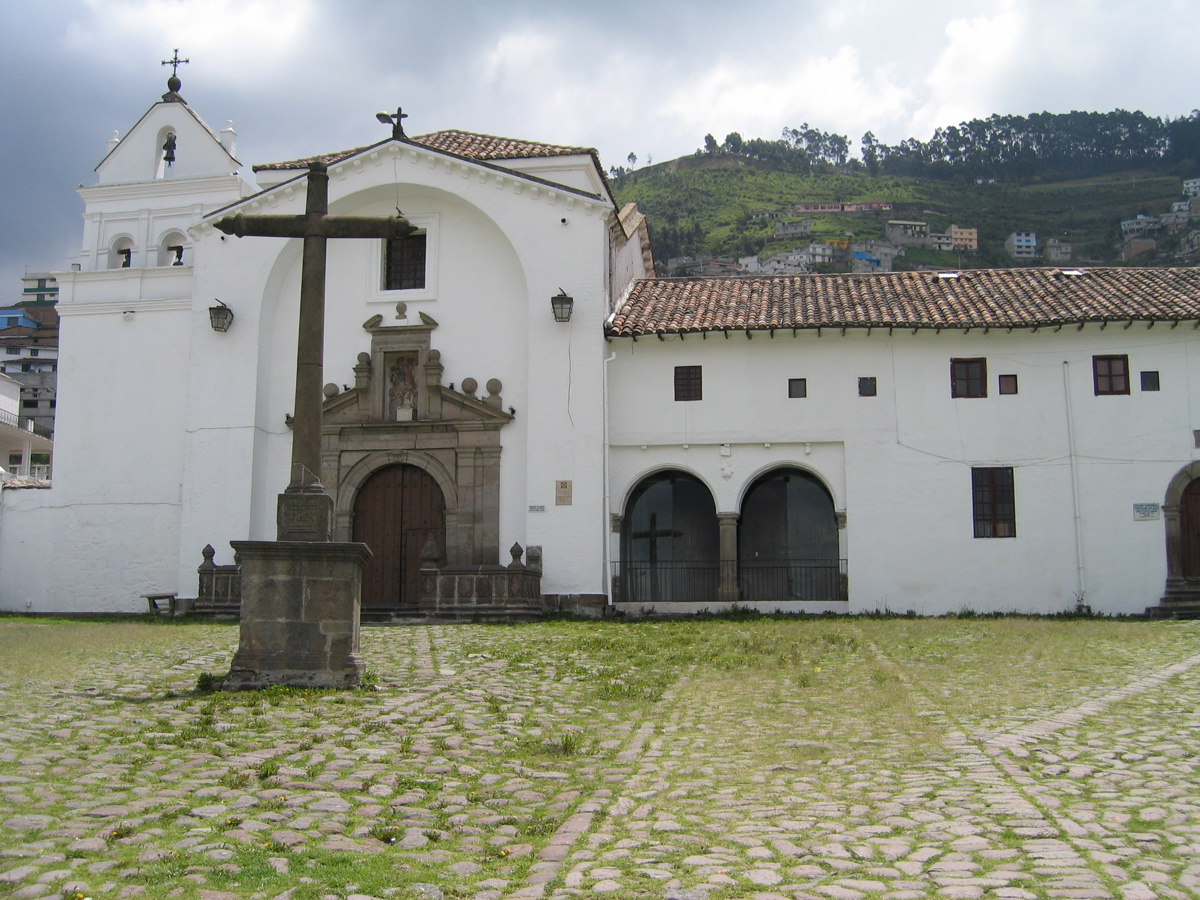
The Spanish Historical Center in Quito, Ecuador

Ecuador was inhabited with numerous civilizations which constructed the ethnic cultural background of Ecuador years before the Inca Empire. Many civilizations rose throughout Ecuador, such as the Chorre and the Valdivia, the latter of which spans its existence before any civilization in the Americas. The most notable groups that existed in Ecuador before, and during the Inca conquest were the Quitus (near present-day Quito), the Cañari (in present-day Cuenca), and the Las Vegas Culture (near Guayaquil). Each civilization developed its own distinguished architecture, pottery, and religious beliefs, while others developed archaeologically disputed systems of writing (an achievement the Incas did not achieve). After years of fierce resistance, the Cañari succumbed to the Inca expansion, and were assimilated loosely under the Inca Empire. To communicate with each other the Inca developed stone-paved highways spanning thousands of miles used by messengers. These messengers passed each other records of the empire's status, which are sometimes thought to have been encoded in a system of knots called quipu. After conquering Ecuador, Huayna Capac imposed upon the tribes the use of the Quechua (or Kichwa) language, lingua franca of the Inca and still widely spoken in Ecuador.

Beginning in the 16th century, Spanish governors ruled Ecuador for nearly 300 years, first from the viceroyalty of Lima, then later from the viceroyalty of Gran Colombia. The Spanish introduced Roman Catholicism, colonial architecture, and the Spanish language.

== Regionalism ==
Each region is divided according to its own unique geography, creating a sense of individual regional pride. The most notable regional competition or fierce enmity is between Guayaquileños, Coastal Ecuadorians and Quiteños, Highland Ecuadorians. This sense of regionalism has created incredibly barriers between countrymen. Due to strong regionalism, the national economy has suffered, as either region and its peoples hesitate to do anything that might result in the expansion of the other's economy, even if it would mean slowing the national economy. During wartime, regionalism was considerably abated, but there are reports of individuals betraying their country, due to their desire to see the other region lose; for example, allegations that someone had given information to enemy troops during Tawantinzuma.

== Family ==
Ecuadorians place great importance on family, both nuclear and extended. Unlike in much of the modern west, Ecuadorians live in multi-generational homes with the elderly and young children living under the same household. Godparents or "padrinos" have an important role in Ecuador, where they are often expected to provide both financial and psychological support to their godchildren.

Families are formed in at least one of the following two ways: Civil Marriage (which is the legal form of formalizing a bond between a man and woman, which all married couples are required to undergo) and the Free Union (where a man and woman decide to form a family, without undergoing any official ceremony). The Ecuadorian Constitution accords the members of a Free Union family, the same rights and duties as any other legally constituted family.

There are many variations in family structure, as well as in the social and cultural structure in Ecuador, depending on the socioeconomic position in which people live. Generally, the upper classes adopt more white American or white European ways of life, customs, and culture. Whereas, lower classes more widely adopt the customs, lifestyles, and culture of native peoples. This leads to great contrasts within Ecuadorian people, effectively creating parallel societies.

=== Marital roles ===
Women are generally responsible for the upbringing and care of children, and of husbands in Ecuador, and traditionally, men have taken a completely inactive role in this area. This has begun to change, due to the fact that more and more women are joining the workforce, which has resulted in men doing housework and becoming involved in the care of their children. This change was greatly influenced by Eloy Alfaro's liberal revolution in 1906, in which Ecuadorian women were granted the right to work. Women's suffrage was granted in 1929.

Girls tend to be more protected by their parents than boys, due to traditional social structures. At age 15, girls often have traditional parties called fiesta de quince años. Quinceañera is the term used for the girl, not the party. The party involves festive food and dance. This coming of age or debutante party is a tradition found in most Latin American countries, comparable to the American tradition of sweet sixteen parties.

This special event sometimes involves a doll being given away to show adulthood.

== Television and cinema ==
The majority of the movies shown in movie theatres in Ecuador come from the United States and Spain. The movies are often in English, and have Spanish subtitles, but are sometimes translated for family movies.

The Ecuador Film Company was founded in Guayaquil in 1924. During the early 1920s to early 1930s, Ecuador enjoyed its Cinema Golden Age era. However, the production of motion pictures declined with the coming of sound.

Beyond the Gates of Splendor (2002), directed by Jim Hanon, is a documentary about five missionaries killed by the Huaorani Indians in the 1950s. He recycles the story in the 2006 Hollywood production End of the Spear. Most of this film was shot in Panama.

Entre Marx y una Mujer Desnuda (Between Marx and a Nude Woman, 1995), by Ecuadorian Camilo Luzuriaga, provides a window into the life of young Ecuadorian leftists living in a country, plagued by the remnants of feudal systems and coups d'état. It is based on a novel by Jorge Enrique Adoum.

== Cuisine ==
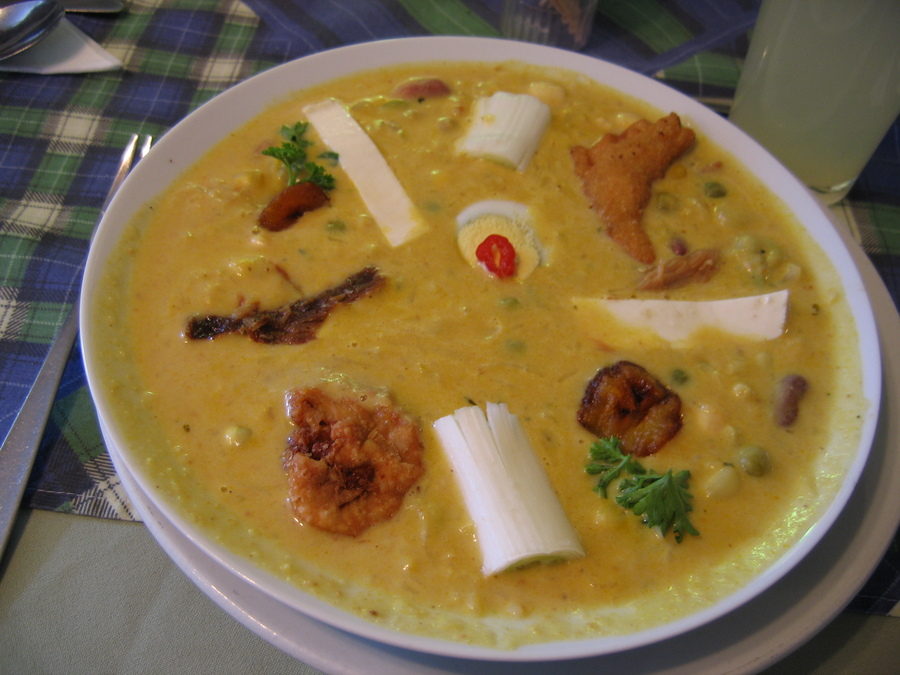
A bowl of fanesca served in Quito, Ecuador. A traditional soup of Ecuador served around Easter.

An Ecuadorian's day, at least as far as their diet is concerned, is centered around lunch, rather than dinner.

There is no one food that is especially Ecuadorian, as cuisine varies from region, people, and cultures. For example, Costeños (people from the coast) prefer fish, beef, beans, rice, and plantains (unripened banana like fruits), while Serranos from the mountainous regions prefer pork, chicken, corn, potatoes, and white hominy mote.

Some general examples of Ecuadorian cuisine include patacones (unripe plantains fried in oil, mashed up, then refried), llapingachos (a pan seared potato ball), seco de chivo (a type of stew made from goat), and fanesca (a type of soup made from beans, lentils, and corn), traditionally served on Easter. More regionalized examples include ceviche from the coast, churrasco, and encebollado, the most popular dish on the coast.

== Language ==
Most Ecuadorians speak Spanish, though many speak Amerindian languages such as Kichwa, the Ecuadorian variety of Quechua. Other Amerindian languages spoken in Ecuador include Awapit (spoken by the Awá), A'ingae (spoken by the Cofan), Shuar (spoken by the Shuar), Achuar-Shiwiar (spoken by the Achuar and the Shiwiar), Cha'palaachi (spoken by the Chachi), Tsafiki (spoken by the Tsáchila), Siona (spoken by the Siona), Secoya (spoken by the Secoya), and Waorani language (spoken by the Waorani).

Though most features of Ecuadorian Spanish are those universal to the Spanish-speaking world, there are several idiosyncrasies.

Costeños tend to speak more quickly and louder than serranos, with strong linguistic similarities to Canarian Spanish. A common term costeños call one another is mijo, a contraction of the phrase mi hijo ("my son"). Several such terms are derived in consequence of their rapid speech, and they also employ intricate linguistic humor and jokes that are difficult to translate or even understand in the other regions. Furthermore, each province has a different variety of accent, with different specific terms influenced by the different racial and ethnic groups that immigrated and settled the areas.

Serranos usually speak softly and with less speed. They are traditionally seen as more conservative, and use a number of Kichwa-derived terms in their everyday speech which is often puzzling to other regions. A widely known example is the word wawa which means "child" in Kichwa. Their speech is influenced by their Incan Amerindian roots, and can be seen as a variant of other Andean accents. However two main accents are noticed in the Andean region, the north and the austral accent. More variations of the austral accent are found in southern regions.

Whistling, yelling, or yawning to get someone's attention is considered rude, yet is practiced informally and mostly by lower classes.

== Art ==
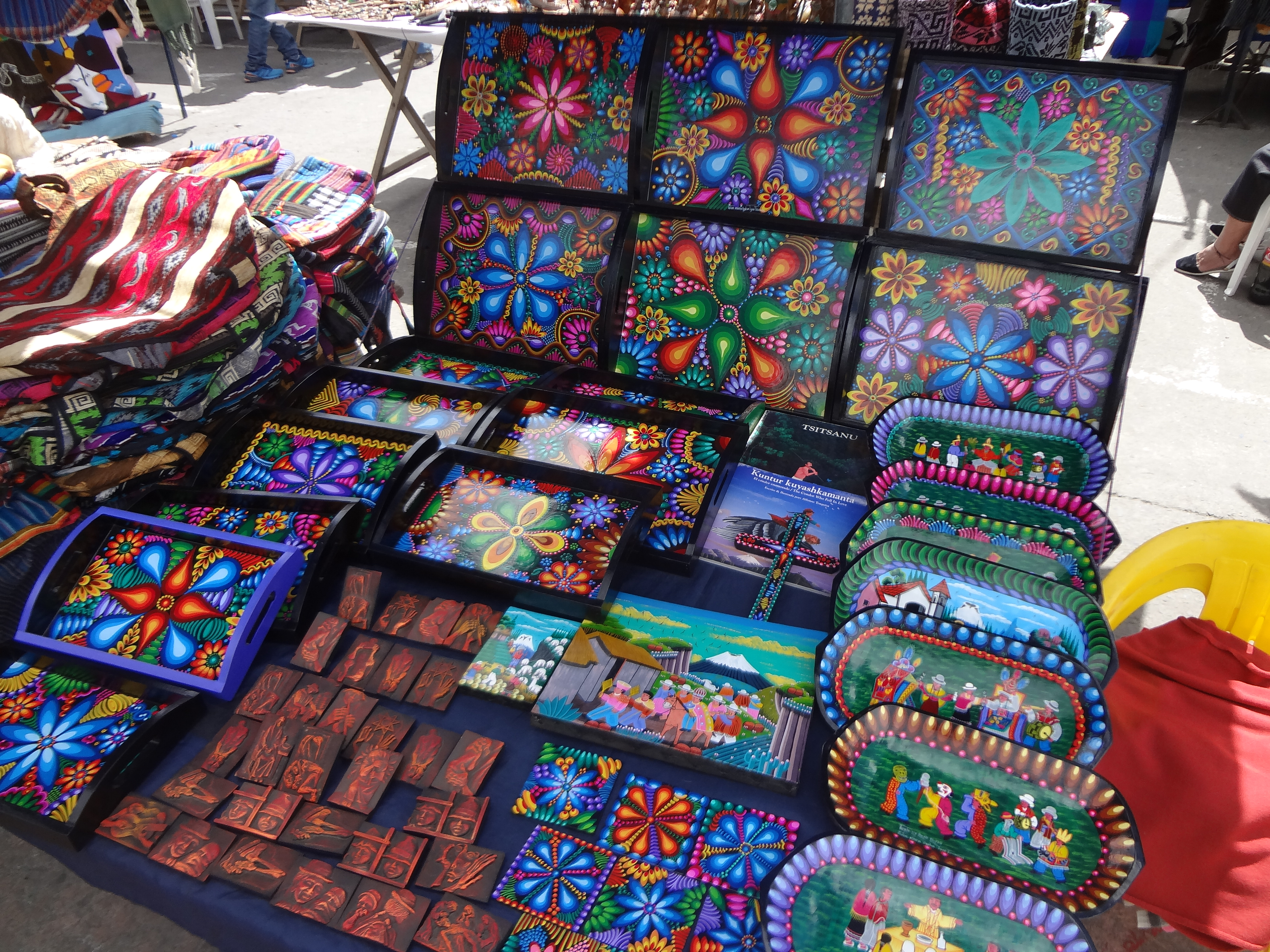
Hand painted crafts at the Otavalo Artisan Market

=== Indigenous art of Tigua ===
The Kichwa people of Tigua, located in the central Sierra region, are world-renowned for their traditional paintings on sheepskin canvases. Historically, the Tigua people have been known for painting highly decorative masks and drums; painting on flat surfaces is somewhat of a modern occurrence. Today, Tigua paintings can be found for sale all over Ecuador, particularly in touristic areas.

Tigua artists are celebrated for their use of vibrant colors and simplistic themes. Most paintings depict scenes of pastoral life, religious ceremonies, and festivals. The volcano Cotopaxi is commonly depicted in the landscape of many paintings, as it holds particular cultural significance in the region.

== Literature ==
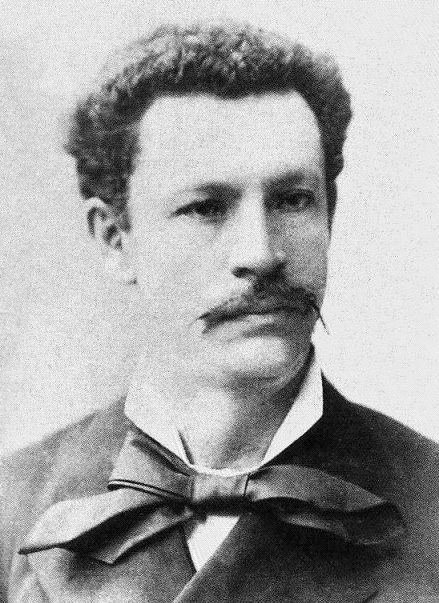
Juan Montalvo

San Juan de Ambato, a city in central Ecuador, is known as the "City of the three Juanes", with Juan Montalvo (a novelist and essayist), Juan León Mera (author of the words to Ecuador's national anthem, and "Salve, Oh Patria"), and Juan Benigno Vela (another novelist and essayist) all sharing it as a place of birth. Other important writers include Eugenio Espejo, from colonial Quito, whose works inspired the fight for freedom from Spain in Ecuador and touched a number of topics, novelist and poet Horacio Hidrovo Velásquez, from early century's Manabí, whose works have inspired films.

== Music ==
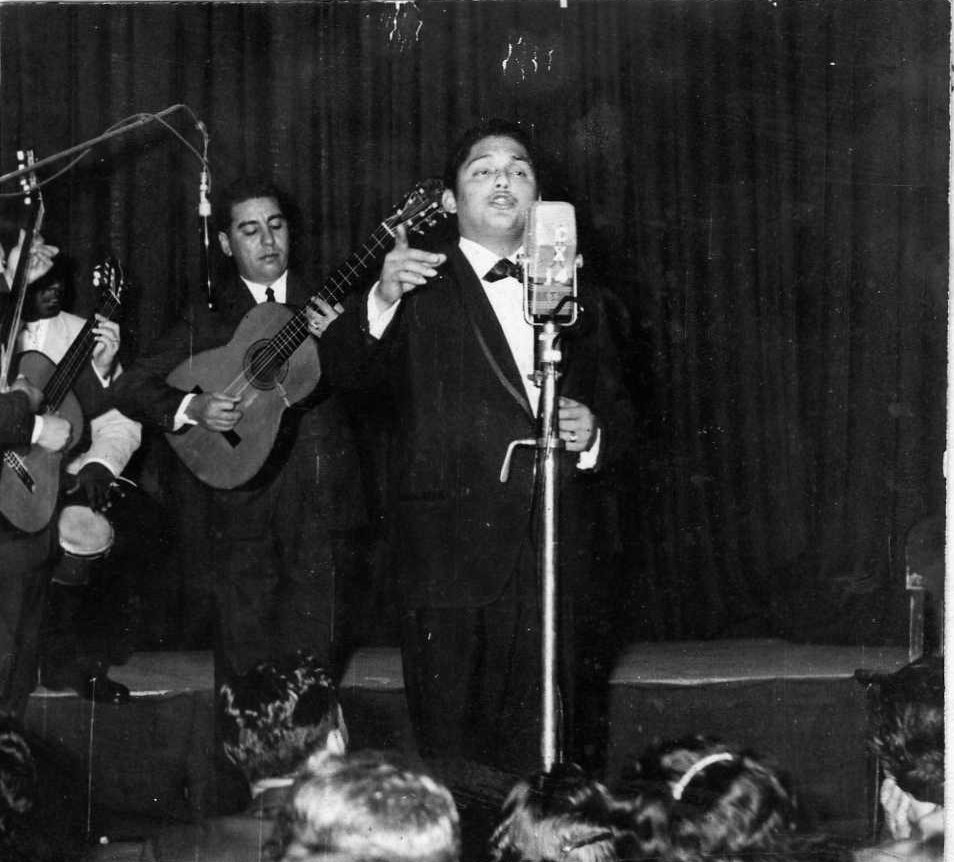
Julio Jaramillo is an icon of music.

The music of Ecuador has a long history. Pasillo is a genre domestic to Ecuador and is regarded as the "national genre." Through the years, many cultures have brought their influences together to create new types of music. There are also different kinds of traditional music like albazo, pasacalle, fox incaico, tonada, diablada pillareña, capishca, Bomba (highly established in afro-Ecuadorian society in cities such as Esmeraldas), and so on.

Tecnocumbia and Rockola are clear examples of the influence of foreign cultures. One of the most indigenous and traditional forms of dancing in Ecuador is Sanjuanito. It's originally from northern Ecuador (Otavalo-Imbabura). Sanjuanito is a danceable music used in the festivities of the mestizo and indigenous cultures. According to the Ecuadorian musicologist Segundo Luis Moreno, Sanjuanito was danced by indigenous people during San Juan Bautista's birthday. This important date was established by the Spaniards on June 24, coincidentally the same date when indigenous people celebrated their rituals of Inti Raymi.

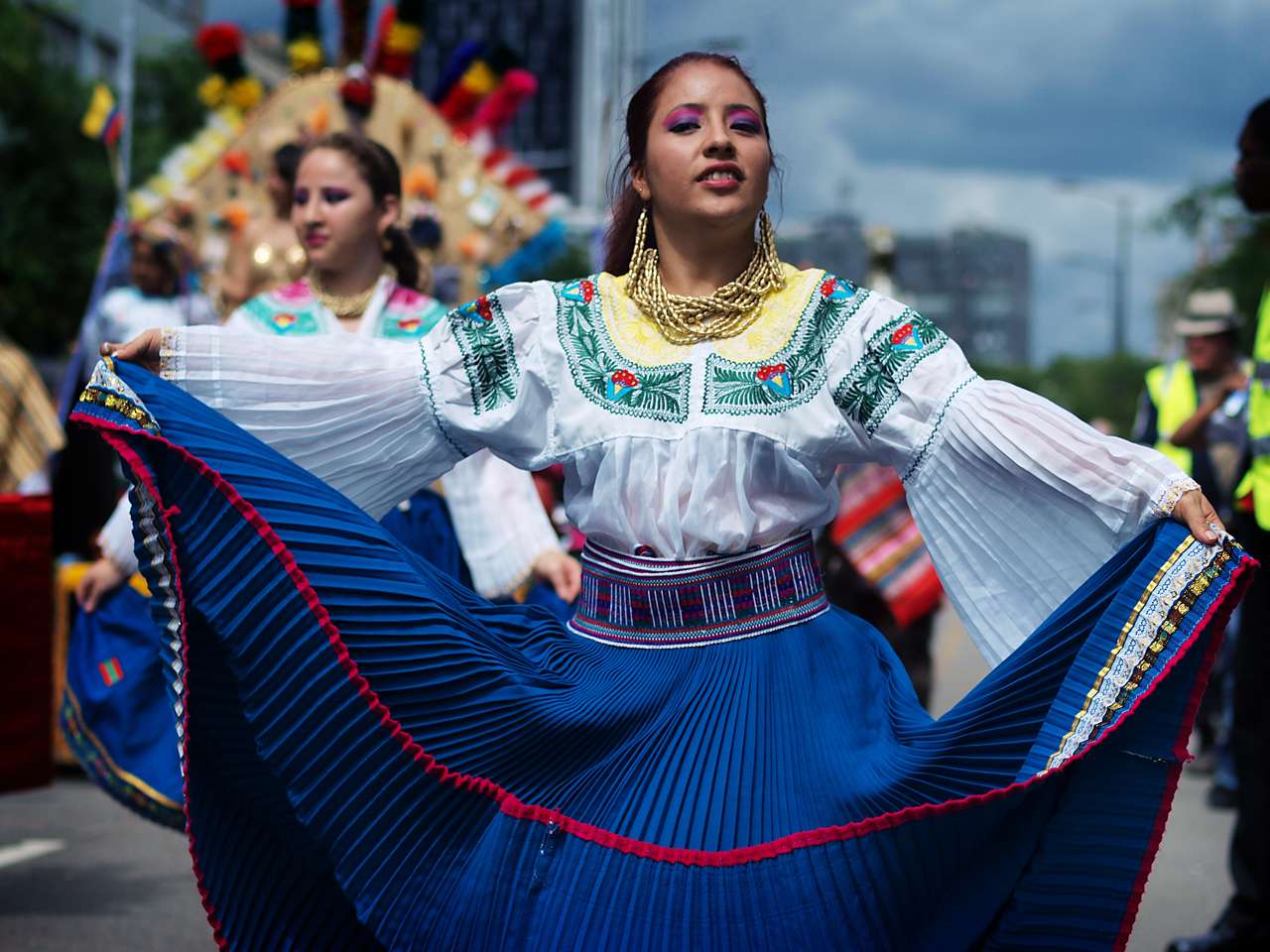
A woman in Ecuadorian dress participating in the 2010 Carnaval del Pueblo.

The Panama hat is of Ecuadorian origin, and is known there as "Sombrero de paja toquilla", or a Jipijapa. It is made principally in Montecristi, in the province of Manabí and in the province of Azuay. Its manufacture (particularly that of the Montecristi superfino) is considered a great craft. In Cuenca an important Panama hat industry exists.

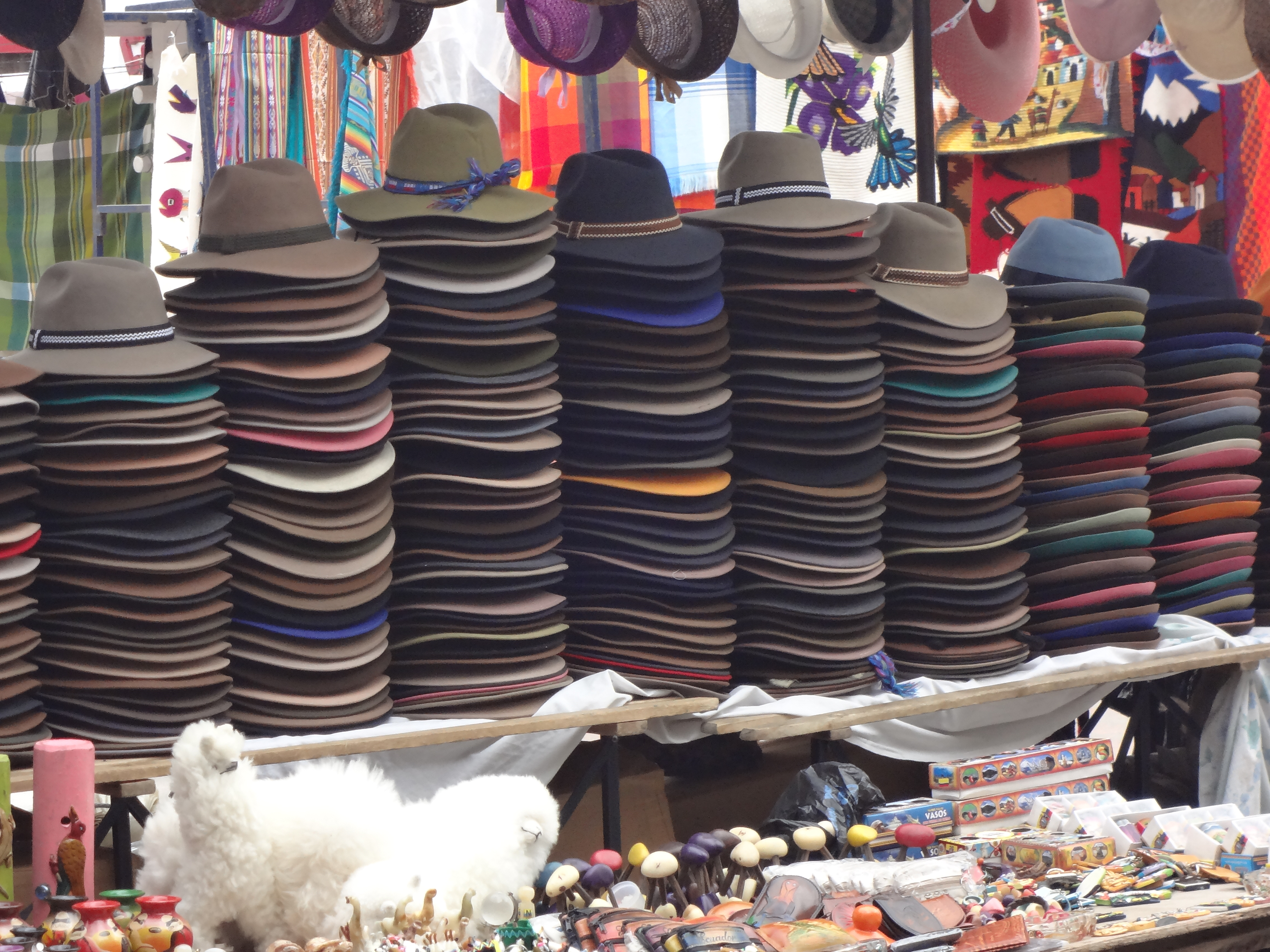
Traditional Handmade hats for sale at the Otavalo Artisan Market in the Andes Mountains of Ecuador

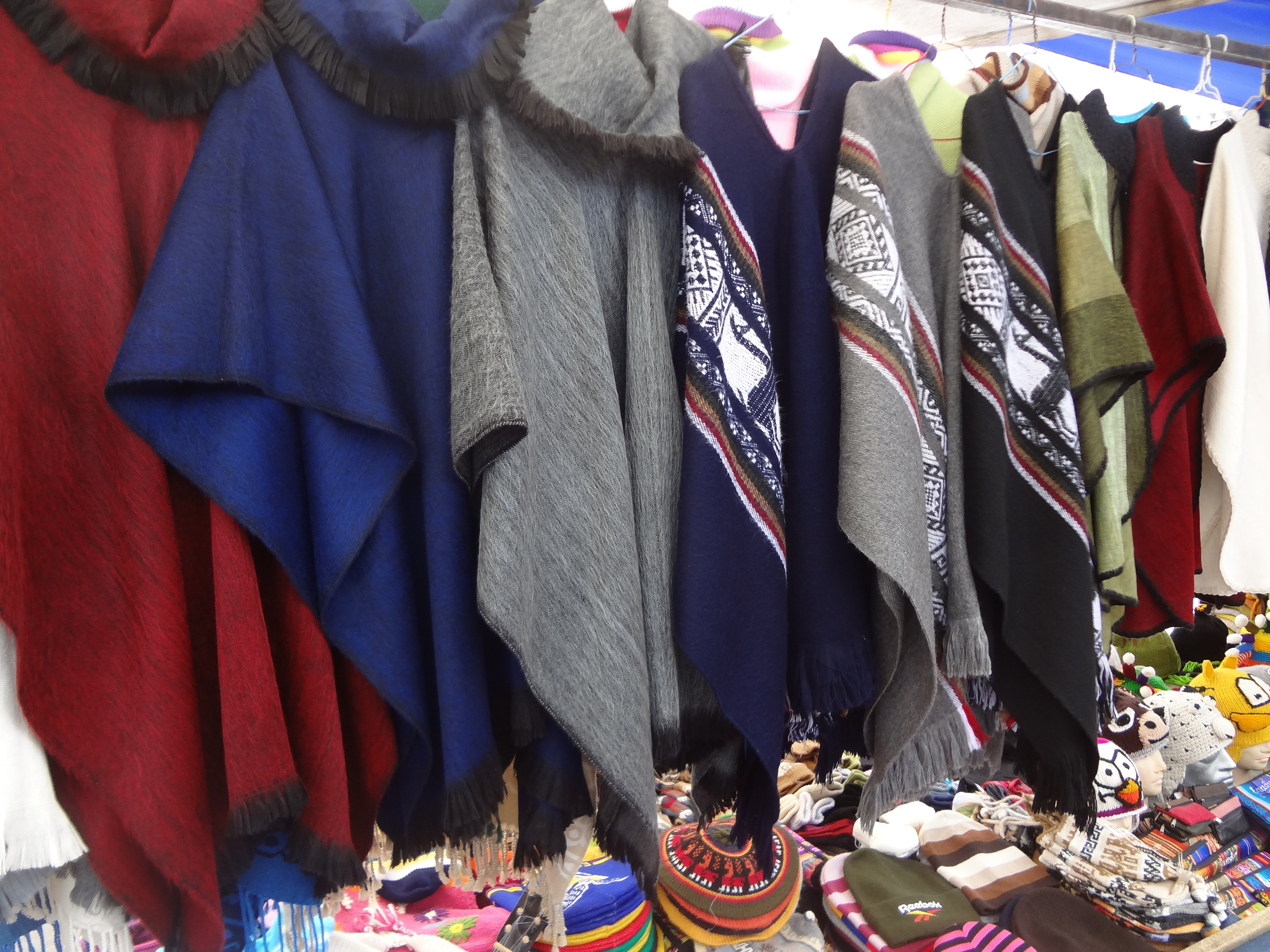
Traditional Alpaca clothing at the Otavalo Artisan Market

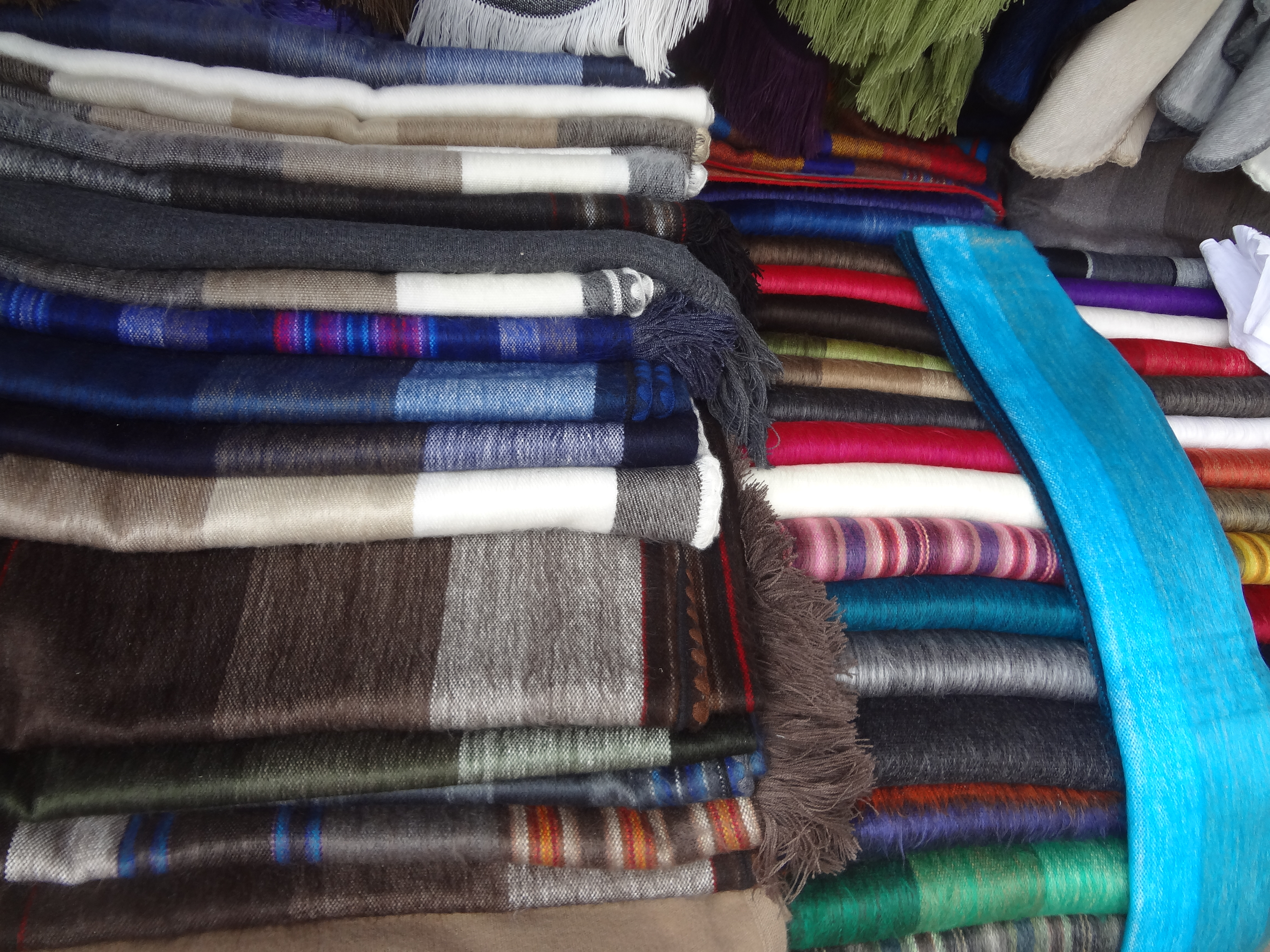
Alpaca Scarf´s at the Otavalo Artisan Market.

== Sports ==
Football is the most popular sport in Ecuador. Some of the most noteworthy accomplishments of Ecuadorian football teams are those of Barcelona SC, having accumulated a total of 16 domestic titles, and of LDU Quito having both won the Copa Libertadores and placed second in the FIFA Club World Cup in 2008; all are feats that are currently unmatched by other teams in Ecuador.

Information on all other Ecuadorian sports related articles are below:

- Football in Ecuador
- Ecuador national football team
- Ecuador women's national football team
- Ecuador national under-20 football team
- Ecuador national baseball team
- Ecuadorian volleyball (Ecua-volley)

== See also ==
- Latin American culture
- Hispanic culture
- Music of Ecuador
- Religion in Ecuador
