= Music of Ecuador =

The music of Ecuador is a diverse aspect of Ecuadorian culture. Ecuadorian music ranges from indigenous styles such as pasillo to Afro-Ecuadorian styles like bomba to modern indie rock like "Cambio de Tonalidad" by Da Pawn.

The Andes mountains house several indigenous styles of music, such as that of the Otavalo. Afro-Ecuadorian music is also a prominent part of the country's scene, with styles such as marimba and bomba stemming from the days of slavery.

Pasillo, pasacalle, and yarabi are popular styles of folksong, with the former being similar to a flute and usually downtempo as it is descended from the waltz. Pasacalle is a form of dance music, while the sentimental yarabi is probably the most popular form in Ecuador.

In recent years, cities such as Guayaquil and Quito have developed an indie rock scene that has allowed bands such as Da Pawn and La Máquina Camaleön to achieve international popularity.

== Andean music (La Sierra) ==
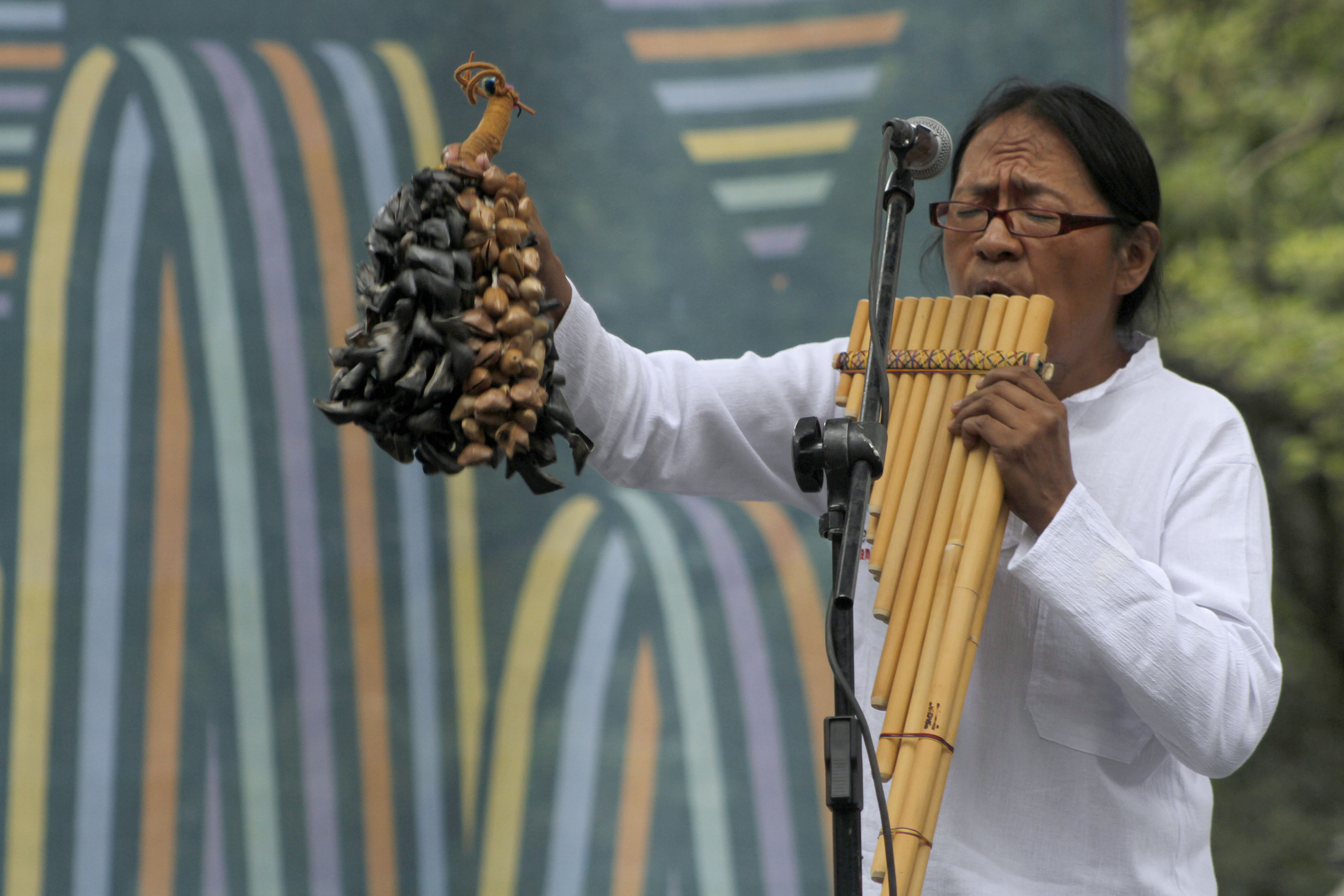
Andean musician on stage.

The mountainous, Andean region of Ecuador, the Sierra, is home to a style of music called Sanjuanito. The music of the Otavalo people is well-known worldwide. A small panpipe called the rondador is the most distinctive instrument, but ensembles are typically groups of wind instruments, guitar trios (often including a bandolin), or brass bands. Folk rhythms include cachullapi, yumbo, and danzante. Musicians like Huayanay have helped to popularize Andean-Ecuadoran music. Musical traditions have been of vital importance for Ecuadorians, especially for the Andean and indigenous peoples. This dates back even before the Spaniards came to conquer the country of Ecuador. As archaeologists went on the hunt towards digging up artifacts, they came across ancient instruments that were a key point in the musical aspect. These instruments varied all the way from various wind instruments such as Pan flutes all the way to drums and guitar types.

== Afro-Ecuadorian music ==
Afro-Ecuadorian music is mainly of two types. Marimba music comes from Esmeraldas, and gets its name from the prominent use of marimbas, along with drums and other instruments specific to this region such as the bombo, the cununo and the wasa. Petita Palma is considered a national treasure for her music. She keeps the tradition going with her group Grupo Folclórico "Tierra Caliente" de Petita Palma which was given a Premio Eugenio Espejo award in 2007. Marimba music also plays a part in Roman Catholic worship in and around Esmeraldas, as well as in celebrations and at parties. It features call and response chanting along with the music. Some of the rhythms associated with it are currulao, bambuco and andarele.

In the Chota Valley, bomba music is the predominant style. The bomba style originates from its namesake instrument, a bomba drum. The drum is played in both single and compound duple meter and is typically accompanied by an ensemble of three guitars, a shaker, and vocals. The origins of bomba are disputed due to lack of written documentation, though it is known to have been created mostly by Afro-Ecuadorian slaves. Bomba was originally a style used only during celebrations and holidays, but following its rise to popularity and commercialization, it has been found in other contexts as well.

Religious practice among afro-Ecuadorians is usually Roman Catholic. There is no significant African religion, although Catholic worship is distinctive in Esmeraldas, and sometimes is done with marimba music.

== San Juanito ==
At the very beginning when Ecuadorian music was starting to flourish, what could be determined is that Patriotism played a major role in the lyrical portion of this genre of music. Individuals in small Ecuadorian villages demonstrated how certain music was fairly symbolic to them. El San Juanito being one of the many genres in Ecuadorian music out there that stressed allegiance. This genre allowed for citizens to feel a sense of belonging as well as the sensation of sentiment and pride of being in a place they called home.

== Pasillo (Costa) ==
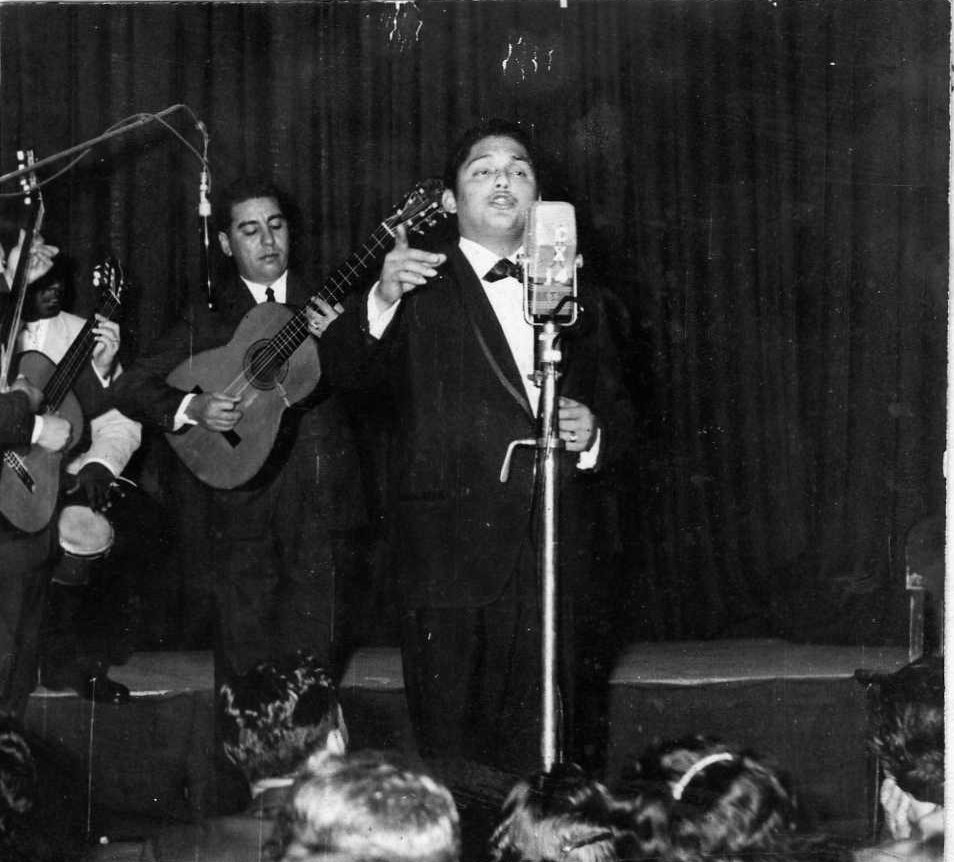
Julio Jaramillo is an icon of the old Bolero music genre.

Pasillo is highly popular in Ecuador. Originally from the coast it has become the "national genre of music." In contrast to other styles of pasillo, however, Ecuadorian pasillo is slow and melancholic, often resting on themes of heartbreak and regret. Pasillo was named the "national style of Ecuador" and is the style of many city anthems, such as that of Guayaquil. Today, it has incorporated more European features of classical dance, such as waltz. As it spread during the Gran Chaco period, pasillo also absorbed the individual characteristics of isolated villages. This gives it an eclectic feel; however, the style, tone, and tempo of the music differ in each village.

In its waltz, pasillo alters the classically European dance form to accompany guitar, mandolin, and other string instruments.

== Ecuadorian Rock ==
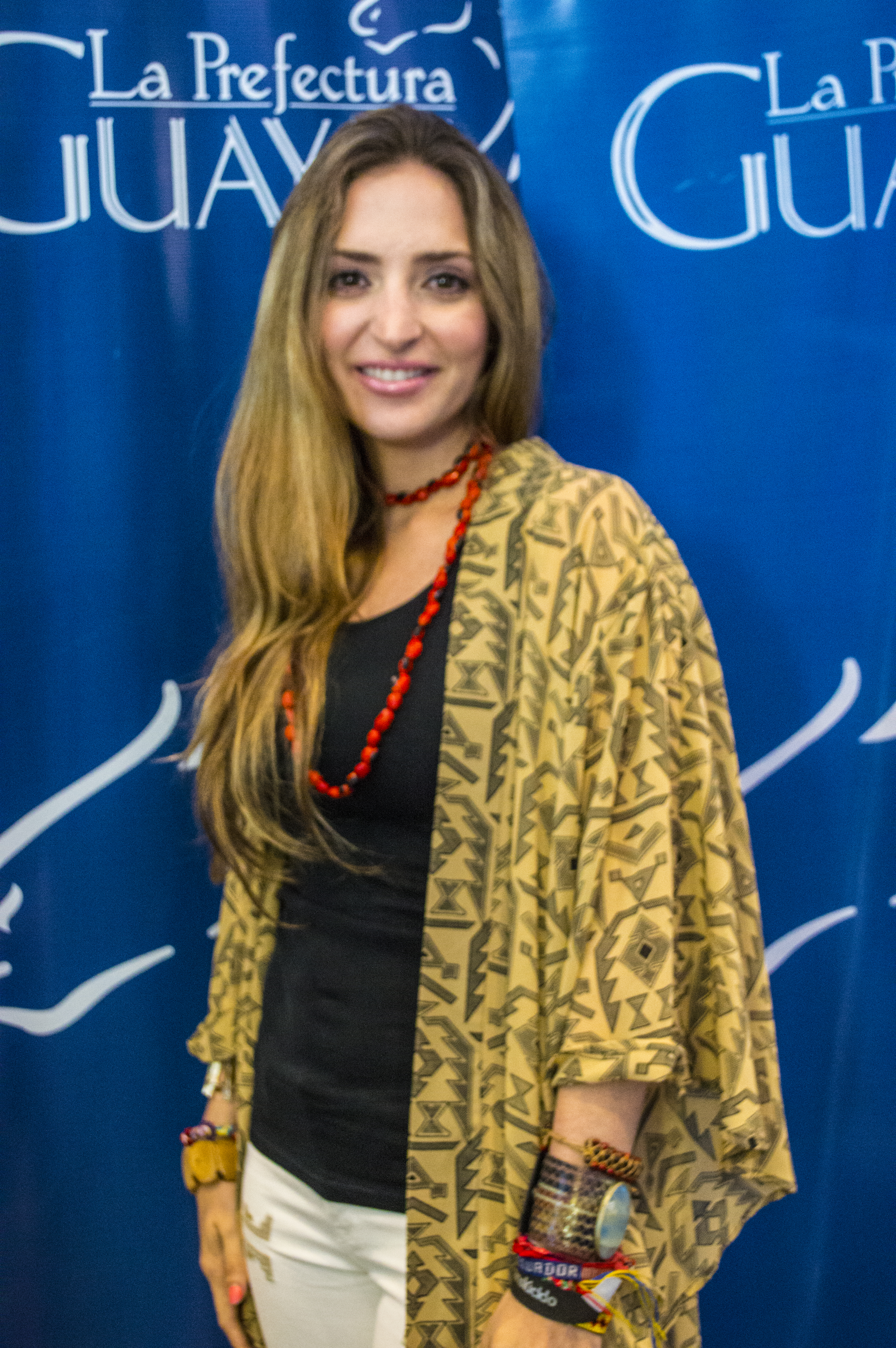
Mirella Cesa

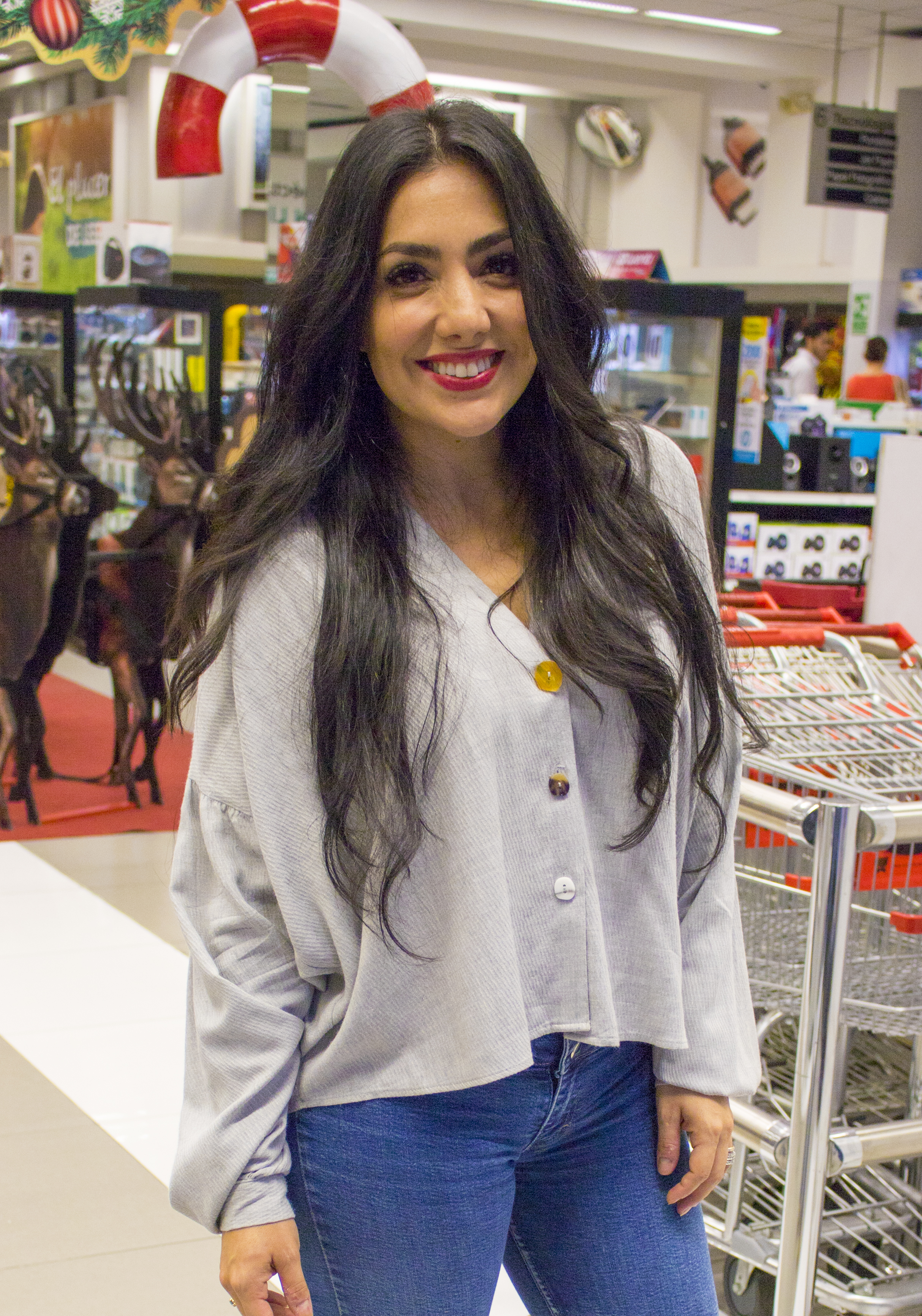
Pamela Cortes

Rock music came to Ecuador in the midst of military dictatorship in the 1960s. Within the context of political culture deeply shaped by Catholicism, rock music was considered to be a dangerous movement that seduced the youth. To left-leaning factions, rock was regarded as an expression of cultural imperialism that corrupts national popular culture. Consequently, groups such as the Catholic Church, the police, and government institutions denounced Ecuadorian rock music following its arrival.

Several mestizo-bands in Ecuador made use of indigenous musical elements in rock music since the 1990s. Rocola Bacalao integrated Andean rhythms and made in their song-texts references to emblematic rural towns, such as Pujilí in Cotopaxi. Sal y Mileto and Casería de Lagartos coined the genre of new Ecuadorian Rock. Nevertheless, in the 1980s and the early 1990s the rhythm of the social as expressed in Ecuadorian rock was characterized by hopelessness and resistance or even resignation against repression. With the emergence of a powerful indigenous movement, the rhythm changed. The most emblematic references towards the political impact of the indigenous movement are made by the metalband Aztra and the hardcore band CURARE at the beginning of the 2000s, during the a time of indigenous social protest against neoliberalism and for democratization. Today, the genre involves different styles including hardcore punk, metalcore, gothic metal, heavy metal, alternative rock, punk, ska, blues, and grunge.

== Folk instruments ==
- Cununo: a percussion instrument similar to a conga drum
- Bombos
- Bandolin: a string instrument similar to a mandolin
- Pinkillu: a wind instrument similar to a wooden recorder. Native to the Quichua people in the Napo province

== Music institutions ==
The Fundación de Desarrollo Social Afroecuatoriano (AZUCAR) has existed since 1993, and offers a variety of workshops for all ages in music and dance, as well as handicrafts and other topics. More information can be found on their website here.

=== Music festivals ===
Ecuador has many annual festivals, with nearly every village celebrating a Roman Catholic Saint. The annual festival in August held in San Antonio de Pichincha is particularly well known, as is the independent music festival Quito Fest.
