= Guayaquil de mis amores =

Song
- English title: Guayaquil of my love
- Recorded: 1930
- Genre: Pasillo
- Songwriter(s): Lauro Dávila
- Composer(s): Nicasio Safadi
- Lyricist(s): Lauro Dávila

Guayaquil de mis amores (English: Guayaquil of my love) is an Ecuadorian song in the form of a pasillo, written by the composer Nicasio Safadi and the lyrics by Lauro Dávila. Its lyrics praise the Ecuadorian city of Guayaquil.

== History ==
The song was made by Safadi in collaboration with the poet Lauro Dávila. It was recorded in New York in 1930, released on the Fediscos record label.

The song's lyrics praise and tell of a respect of the values of the city of Guayaquil, and it is thought of as one of the symbols of the culture of Guayaquil as a city, along with Guayaquileño madera de guerrero.

The historian Alan Larrea also points out that the song is a poem written by Medardo Silva, made famous by Dávila.
