= Prime Ministers (band) =

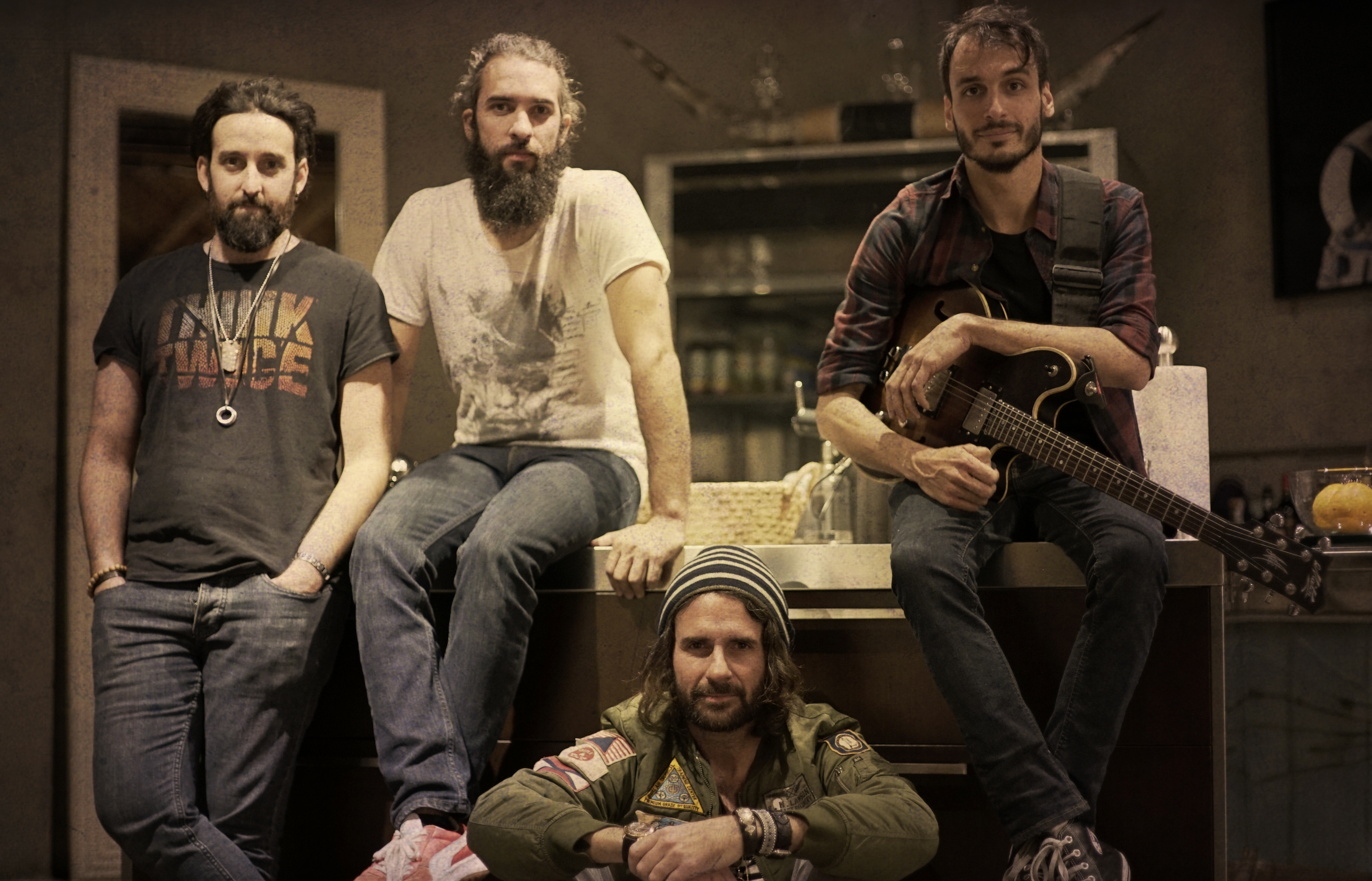
- Prime Ministers in 2017

Background information
- Origin: Miami, Florida, United States / Guayaquil, Ecuador
- Genres: Alternative rock, rock
- Years active: 2007–present
- Labels: Space 52
- Members: Ernesto "E" Estrada; Alejandro "Alex" Zon; Fabio "Shaggy" López; Alejandro "Ale" Carrau
- Past members: Pedro "Perico" Argüello; Jaime "Chimo" Solórzano; Jorge Juis "Pala" Varela
- Website: primeministersband.com

Prime Ministers is a rock band from Ecuador, formed in 2008. The band consists of Ernesto "E" Estrada (lead vocals, guitars and piano), Alejandro "Alex" Zon (drums), Fabio "Shaggy" López (guitars and vocals) and Alejandro "Ale" Carrau (bass).

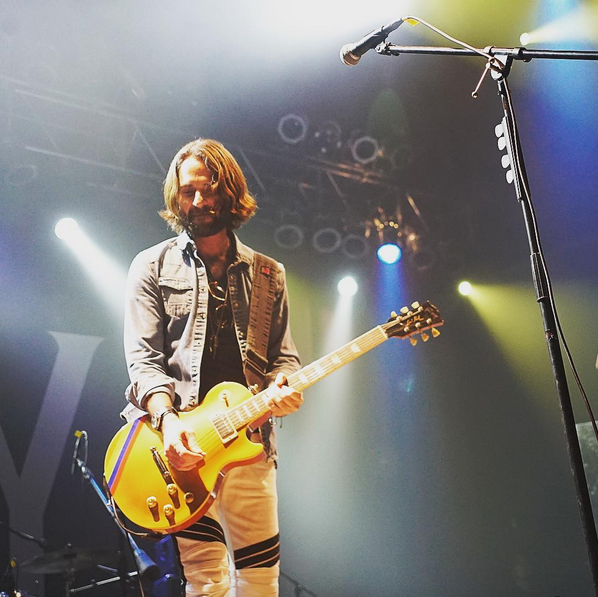
Ernesto "E", "Ernie" Estrada, of the band Prime Ministers - Live at Aztec Theatre

== History ==
Prime Ministers formed as a band in 2008. They released their first album Take a Ride in 2009 and were invited to perform at music festivals including South By Southwest, in Austin, Texas (USA) and Rock al Parque in Bogota (Colombia).

Their singles "Smoking Monkeys" and "Under Your Spell" reached the number one in Radio and the video for "Far From Free" went to number one in MTV Latino. They were chosen as one of the 50 Best bands of the year.

Prime Ministers' first video "Smoking Monkeys" reached the top 10 in MTV Latin America.

In 2010, the song "Under Your Spell" was included in the program Los 100 + Pedidos, an annual program broadcast on MTV Latin America.

In February 2011, they released a new video for the single "Far From Free", arriving at number one out of the top 10 most requested videos of MTV Latin America. "Far From Free" was also selected to be part of the official music of the telenovela Popland!, broadcast to all Latin America and for the US by MTV.

In July 2011, they closed the first day of the annual Rock al Parque music festival in Bogotá, Colombia

In January 2012, the Mayor of the Metropolitan District of Quito, the Sucre National Theater and the institution Mis Bandas Nacionales de Ecuador presented Prime Ministers with two awards: The Gold Medal and the MBN Statuette for their international performance.

On March 15, 2012, the Prime Ministers performed at SXSW festival in Austin, Texas.

In June 2014 they released their second album, NOW, produced by Max Heyes. This was their first release in the United States. To promote the album, Prime Ministers performed at festivals including The Great Escape (Brighton, UK) and Rock X La Vida (Mexico), touring with the Chilean band La Ley throughout United States and Mexico.

The video for the first single, "Take It Back" won the Best Video of the Year Award from the institution Mis Bandas Nacionales de Ecuador.

Prime Ministers released the first single "New Beginnings" from their third record, Asymmetric, on January 24, 2017. The track was described by PureVolume as having a "bouncy, rocking vibe that will make your head bob back and forth."

== Discography ==
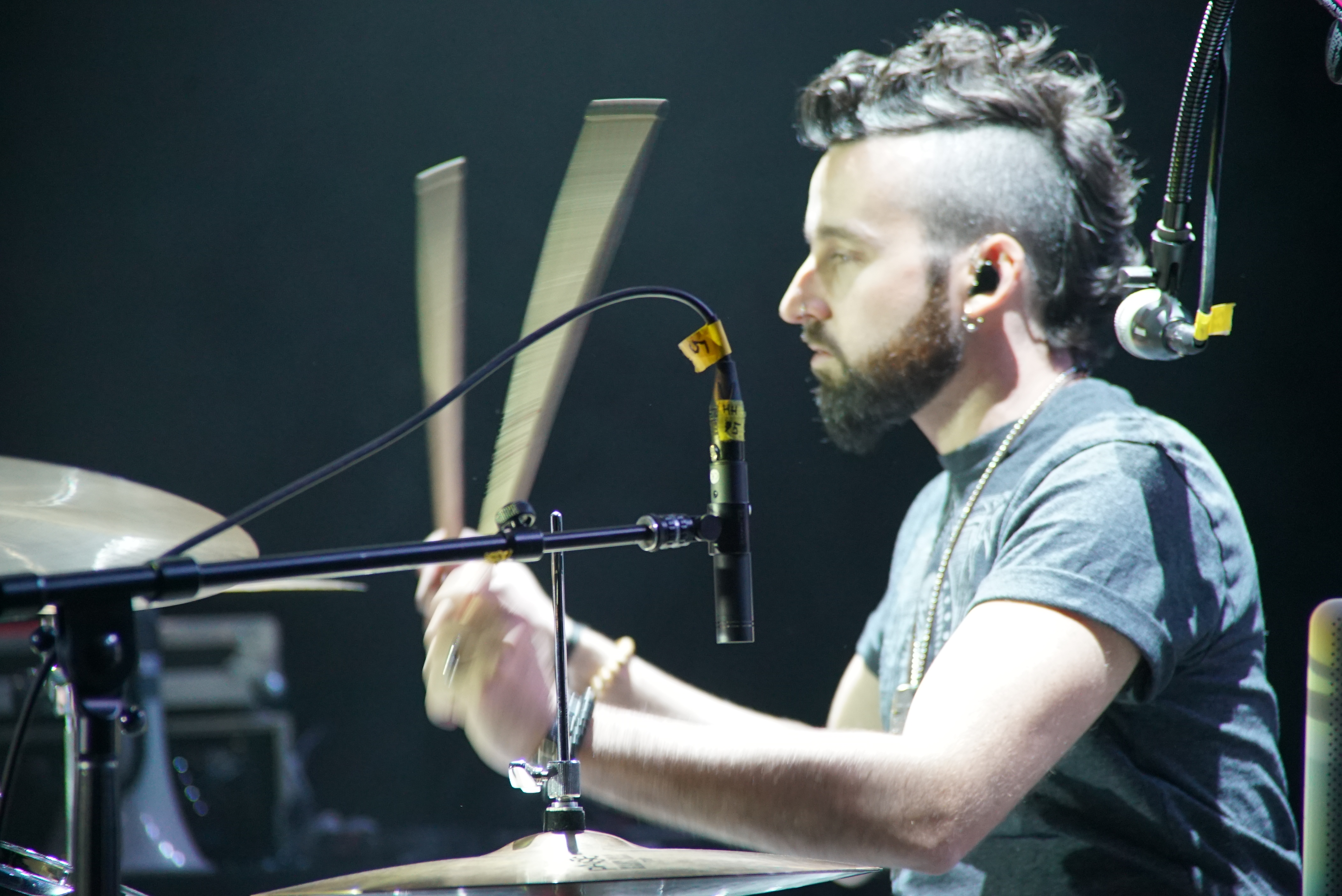
Drummer Alejandro "Alex" Zon in 2016

=== Albums ===
- Take A Ride (2009)
- Now (2014)
- Asymmetric (2017)

=== Singles ===
- "Smoking Monkeys" - January 2010
- "Under Your Spell" - March 2010
- "Far From Free" - September 24, 2010
- "Take It Back" - March 31, 2014
- "New Beginnings" - January 24, 2017

== See also ==
- Music of Ecuador
- Ecuadorian rock
