= Carlos Arizaga Toral =

Ecuadorian composer

Carlos Arizaga Toral (1891-1972) was an Ecuadorian composer, best known for songs such as Gotas de ajeno. He was born in the city of Cuenca in 1891. A student of Ecuadorian poetry, he wrote several essays on this topic. Apart from the pasillo Gotas de ajeno (lyrics by Julio Florez), he also composed tangos, polkas and pasodobles. He was an accomplished player of the piano, bandoneon, serrucho and guitar.

He was active in politics and served as deputy for Azuay province in multiple legislatures, he was also a cabinet minister in the 1930s.

He died in Cuenca in 1972.
