= Hilda Murillo =

Ecuadorian singer

- Born: Hilda Murillo Saavedra; December 15, 1951 (age 74); Guayaquil, Ecuador
- Occupation: Singer
- Political party: Social Christian
- Spouse: Pío Cupello (died 2011)
- Parents: Washington Murillo (father); Fresia Saavedra (mother)

Hilda Murillo Saavedra (born December 15, 1951) is an Ecuadorian singer, also known as "La Triunfadora de América".

== Biography ==
Hilda Murillo was born in Guayaquil on December 15, 1951, the daughter of singer and music teacher Fresia Saavedra and guitarist and composer Washington Murillo. Singing since age four, at seven she recorded a disc of children's tunes with the Orquesta América. This produced the hit songs "La Marcha de las Letras" and "La Canción de los Domingos". She would later record more Ecuadorian songs together with her mother. In her youth she studied medicine, but dropped out in her third year to dedicate herself to music, particularly the genres of pasillo, bolero, and ballad.

The title track of her 1973 album Palabras, Palabras was a #1 hit on Miami radio, and was awarded a gold record. She was declared Woman of the Year by Vanidades magazine, in addition to being named the most successful Latina artist by the Association of Latin Entertainment Critics.

Hilda Murillo represented Ecuador at the OTI Festival 1974 in Mexico. She has also been a television presenter, and president of the Association of Professional Artists of Guayas (ASAPG).

In 2018, she received a Boca en Boca Award for her musical career from TC Televisión in Guayaquil. That year she also released her album Hilda Murillo para siempre. In the same year she sang with her mother at the Museum de Pasillo in Quito where people had gathered to recognise the 87 year old singer Héctor Jaramillo.

She was a candidate for the National Assembly in 2021, representing District 2 of Guayas Province for the Social Christian Party, but did not receive sufficient votes to be elected.

Her husband, businessman Pío Cupello, died in 2011.
