= Bandolin =

15-stringed musical instrument in Ecuador

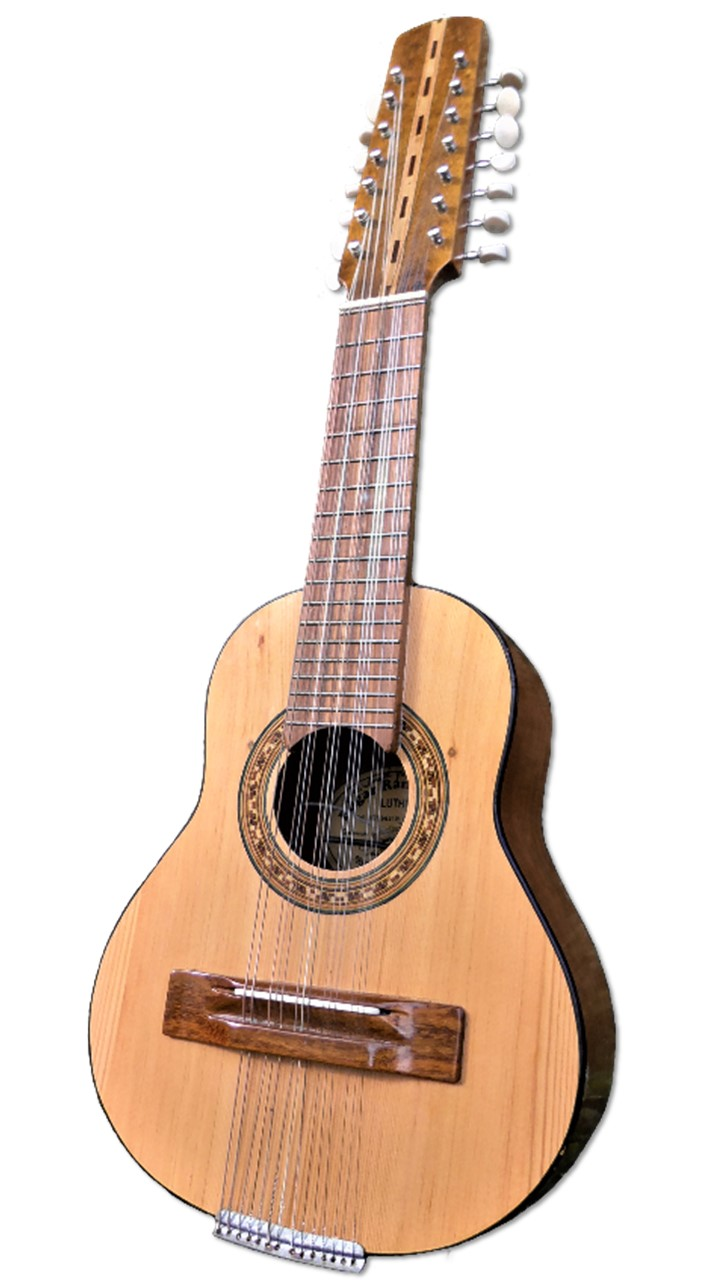
- An Ecuadorian bandolin

String instrument
- Classification: Composite chordophone
- Hornbostel–Sachs classification: 321.322 (necked box lute)
- Developed: Ecuador

Related instruments
- Bandola, Bandurria, Laúd, Mandolin, Mandola

The bandolin is a 14-stringed, 15-stringed or 16-stringed musical instrument in Ecuador. It is used as a rhythm and melody instrument in the Andean region of Ecuador during festivals where dancing and music are involved. It has a flat back and (typically) 15 strings in triple courses.

== Uses ==
In the Andean region of Ecuador, the bandolin is used during the celebration of the feasts of San Juan and San Pedro, along with several other instruments including: twin flutes, guitars, violins, quenas, a drum, a charango, a rondador, and a harmonica. The music and dance that characterize the festival is called a sanjuanito. The bandolines and the guitars mark the 2/4 tempo of the sanjuanito rhythm, which is accentuated by the bombo, and the quenas, rondador, and violins carry the melody.

== Construction and tuning ==
Bandolin tuning.

The body shape of the bandolin is similar to that of the bandola, the cuatro, or the guitar, with the caveat that, just as in the case of the mentioned instruments, luthiers who produce bandolins will incorporate into their personal designs changes to the body shape for a variety of reasons. It has 15 strings, in five courses of triple strings, in a Baritone guitar-tuning (but an Octave up). It has a flat back, metal frets, and a slightly raised fingerboard in the front. The 15 strings run over a floating bridge to a metal tailpiece on the end of the body.

It is tuned E4 E3 E4, A4 A3 A4, D4 D4 D4, F#4 F#4 F#4, B4 B4 B4 or E4 E3 E4, A4 A3 A4, D4 D4 D4, G#4 G#4 G#4, B4 B4 B4.

== See also ==
- Music of Ecuador
