= Albazo =

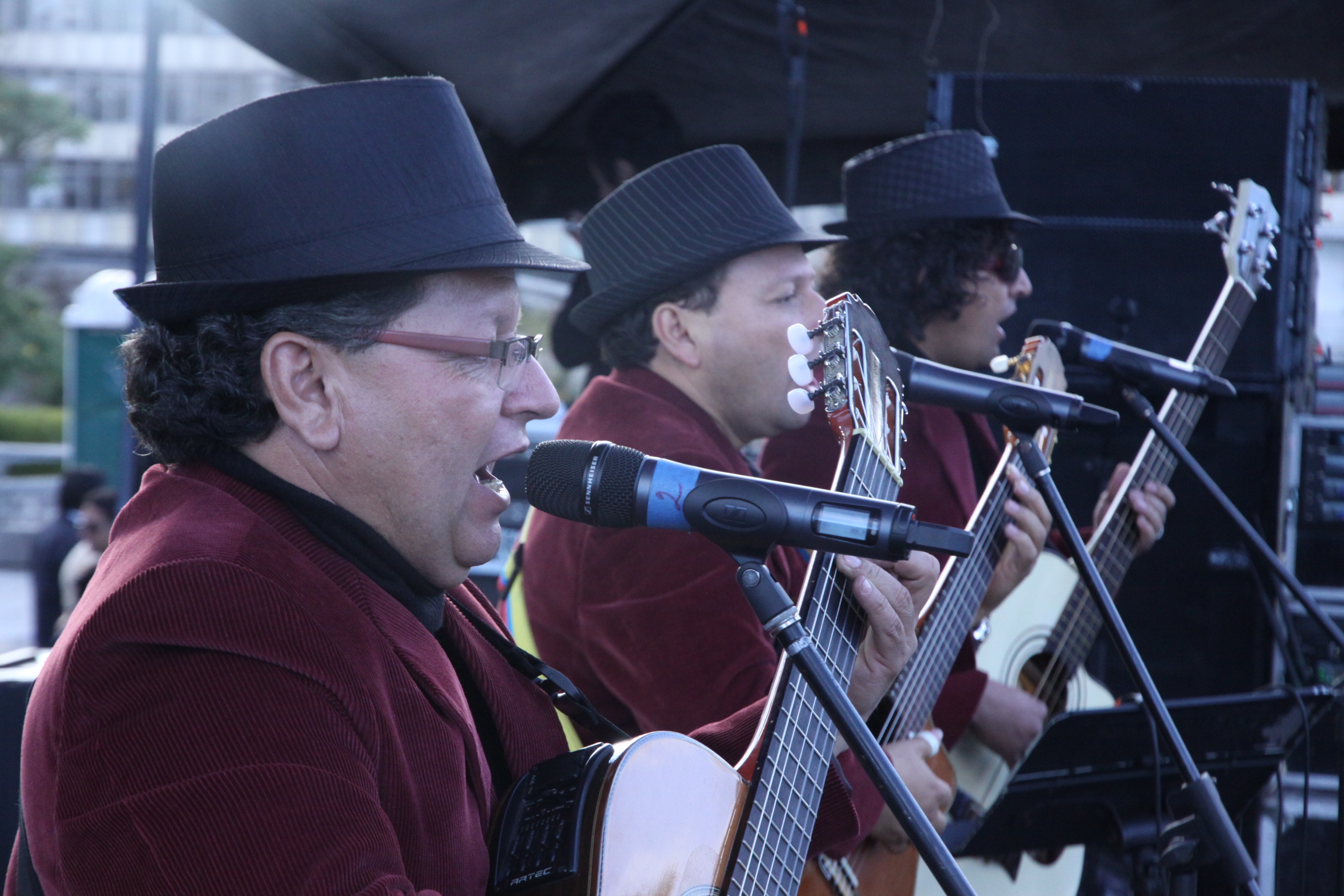
- Trio playing Albazo music
- Stylistic origins: Aubade; Bambuco; Fandango
- Cultural origins: Sierra region, Ecuador
- Typical instruments: Snare drum; Guitar; Requinto; Arpa

Albazo is a music genre that originated in the Sierra region of Ecuador that is popular throughout the country. It is characterized by an upbeat tempo, it's triple meter. It is usually played at parties and has many varieties.

== Origins ==
Albazo is a rhythm that has been generally associated with bands called the bandas de pueblo, that participate in the major festivities in the streets at sunrise. It is due to this that the name for the genre, as it is a derivation of the Spanish term for the sunrise (alba), along with the additional suffix -azo.

=== History ===
There exists various theories as to the genre's origin. One of the theories traces its roots in the alborada, fandango, and zamacueca; of which it would be influence by the Chilean cueca and the Argentinian zamba, and would be danced in the style of fandago, as it commonly would be in the Americas. Another theory is through the composer Luis H. Salgado, who classified it as one of the "danzas criollas" of Ecuador, together with Aire típico and Alza. There is another theory on Albazo's origin, based on studies made by Gerardo Guevara who relates it to the Yaraví but interpreted in a more upbeat tempo, something that is common in the sounds of classical music in Ecuador. This last theory ties it with the Bambuco colombiano has a shared origin with the Quechua, who make ceramics that they use to interpret the genre. This relation has been explored as having permitted the creation of son sureño which is the fusion of Albazo and Bambuco. With its triple meter that is supposed to imitate the gallop of a horse, of which it has been used to represent the chagra, often told by the vaqueros in the north central forests of Ecuador. One of the most recognized albazos in this genre is "La Vuelta del Chagra".

== Structure and examples ==
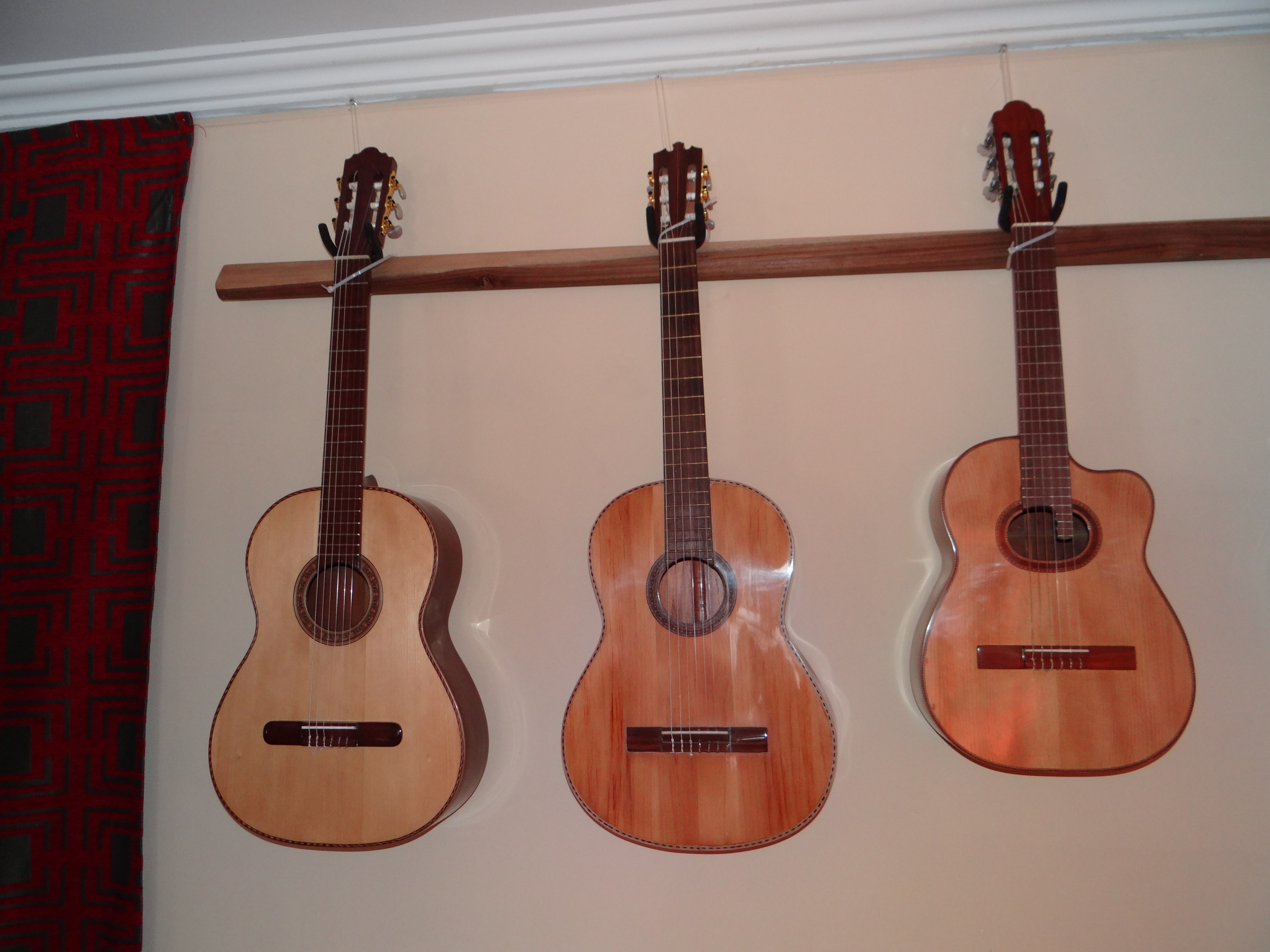
Trio of guitars in the historic center of Quito

Despite the predominance of a minor modality, Albazo has a whimsical and festive rhythm that often brings people to dance and to be happy, this in part being due to having 6/8 meter. It's texts are constituted of verses or little poems that touch on variety of different themes. It's rhythm alternates between binary and tertiary (empiola) tempos, for which its accompaniment results in such complexity that for those who are not accustomed to play the instrument required for these rhythms.

=== Variations in the accent ===
There are various forms of the classification of albazos, as well as various forms of dances and themes in triple meter with slight rhythmic changes like syncopes or the tempo. It has been identified for its six variations, that many times tend to be considered as separate musical genres:

- Albazo I: traditional interpretation and is known simply as Albazo.
- Albazo II: Syncopated interpretation, usually with bombo. It is a genre from the south of Ecuador known as Capishca.
- Albazo III: Syncopated interpretation, exemplified by a larger tonality and the second by a smaller tonality. It is known as Saltashpa.
- Albazo IV: Syncopated and lighter interpretation, it is related to the chilena and is of a festive character. It is known as Aire típico.
- Albazo V: Interpretation similar to Albazo III. It is in the third tempo and it is marked by an accent and chord changes. It is known as Alza.
- Albazo VI: Distinct interpretation compared to the rest and is known as Aire tradicional. An example is the song "Mi Tierra Linda el Ecuador".

=== Variations in the tempo ===
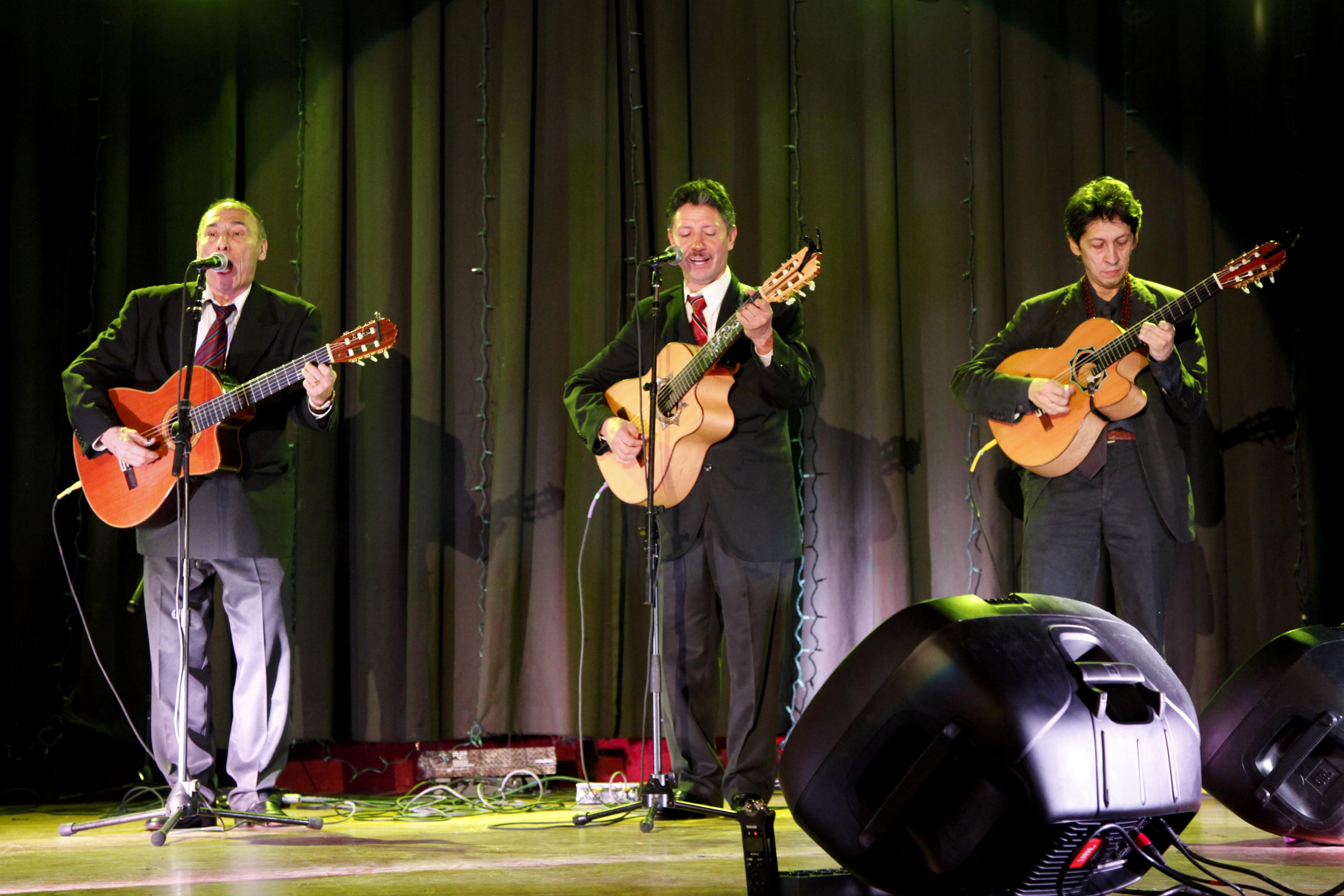
A trio playing albazos

The tempo of Albazos can vary greatly, depending on the level of festive character that the composer wanted to adopt to the theme in question. This moreover is something that takes into account the bands of the town to interpret the Albazos. In general, there are bands who tend to have a faster tempo until the end, as those would be the ones that would dance together with pyrotechnics during festivals.

Although the decrease of the tempo in Albazo is similar to the Pasillo and the Yaraví, during the increase in the tempo many composers seek to "tropicalizar" the Albazo and make it purely dance-oriented. This permits the genre to make the music very versatile and going on to make it fuse with reggaeton as is in the case of "El delicioso" by Papaya dada. The musicological investigation of this genre and its compatibility with tropical genres also brings in the inclusion of the proposal of its fusion with the sounds of Southwest Africa.

=== Examples ===
Among all the different types of Albazo with their variety, there are many compositions. The following is a selection of some of the most popular:

- Amarguras
- Apostemos que me caso
- Avecilla
- Ay no se puede
- Dolencias (solamente el segmento final)
- Compadre péguese un trago
- Esta guitarra vieja
- El Huiracchurito
- La Venada
- Morena la Ingratitud
- La vuelta del chagra
- Que lindo es mi Quito
- Simiruco
- Si tú me olvidas
- Triste me voy
- Zapatea

== See also ==
- Bomba
- Sanjuanito

== Bibliography ==
- Barra Cobo, Daniela (16 May 2023). Universidad San Francisco de Quito (ed.). Gráfica musical 1960: diseño y música popular ecuatoriana [1960s Musical Graphics: Design and Ecuadorian Popular Music] (in Spanish). Quito, Ecuador: USFQ Press. p. 216, pp. s/n. ISBN 9978682422.
