= Jhon Minda =

Ecuadorian footballer (born 1986)

Personal information
- Full name: Jhon Stalin Minda García
- Date of birth: 21 July 1986 (age 40)
- Place of birth: Chota, Ecuador
- Position: Midfielder

Team information
- Current team: El Nacional

Youth career
- 1998–2005: El Nacional

Senior career*
Years	Team	Apps	(Gls)
2005–present	El Nacional		
- * Club domestic league appearances and goals as of 30 October 2008 ‡ National team caps and goals as of 30 October 2008

Jhon Stalin Minda García (born July 21, 1986) is an Ecuadorian footballer currently playing for Club Deportivo El Nacional. He plays as a midfielder.
