= Chota, Ecuador =

Area in Ecuador

Coordinates: 0°28′N 78°04′W

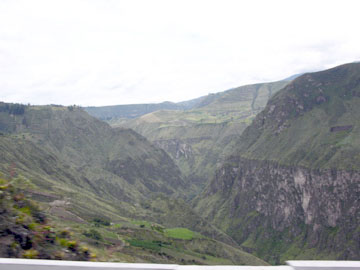
Descent into the Chota Valley by bus, coming from Carchi Province

The Chota is the upper river valley of the Mira River in Ecuador. The small villages along it are usually referred to as 'El Chota', and it runs east–west between the two ranges of the Andes. It lies in the provinces of Imbabura, Carchi and (to the west) Esmeraldas. The river and its upper valley are situated about halfway between the equator and the Colombian border. Accessed off Route 35, the nearest major city is Quito, but Ibarra is the major market centre just south of the valley. It is reputed to be where the best soccer players in the country tend to come from.

In the only village actually named el Chota, Spanish-speaking black Creole villagers have a resident Catholic priest and community centers, but there are eleven other Afro-Ecuadorean villages with more than 100 inhabitants in the upper Chota (El Juncal, Piquiucho, Chalguayacu, et al.). The Quechua-speaking farmers and mestizo landowners live where there is rain for agriculture, more than 250 m. above the valley bottomlands higher up in the Andes mountains. All the parroquias (provincial administrative centers) presiding over the Valley —except Ambuquí— are at those elevations. Located beside the Chota River, the Chotans (choteños) live from growing sugar cane, making aguardiente (cane brandy) and a range of other irrigated crops (tomatoes, avocados and beans) and raising pigs and goats. The valley bottom lies at around 1700 metres but the Panamerican Highway to the north rises quickly to over 3000 metres high.

The majority of Chota Valley people are of African descent. Their ancestors were brought here as slaves during the colonial period, particularly when many of the great sugar estates were owned and organised by the Jesuits. According to research done in the 1960s, the Jesuit administrator in Panamá City purchased 100 slaves that were sent via the coast to work the cane fields after the lands were donated to the Society of Jesus, the previous encomendado having worked his native residents to death during a malaria outbreak. Oral history claims almost all the black residents of the valley descend from the named list of 74 survivors of the trek, who arrived in 1775. [Esmeraldas, to the west, is the main home of people of African descent in the country. These people are supposedly descendants of slaves escaping from wrecked slave ships, just as is the African descendant population of the Choco in Colombia.] Similar African descendant populations, occur in the hot valley south of Cuenca in southern Ecuador and, to the north in Colombia, in the Patía valley.

The Chota valley is somewhat culturally unique as a black settlement in Hispanic America located far from the lowlands. Afro-Bolivians of the Yungas are similarly located away from coastal areas. Because they have preserved some of their ancestral cultures and absorbed traditions of their predominately indigenous neighbors, rather than other Afro-Latino cultures, they are cultural isolates.

The climate in the upper Chota valley can be hot or cool, but is consistently dusty. The valley bottom is dry (around 100–250 mm. annually) and temperatures range between 16 and 29 degrees Celsius. The river valley descends towards the coast after leaving the Chota and passes through cloud forest into coastal ecology that is much more humid. Annual flooding and landslides are a dangerous problem in the rainy season. Homes are simple and most are one or two rooms only. They are now made of cinder blocks although some of the traditional wattle and daub of grass and reeds remain beside adobe houses. Plantain, reed and palm branch thatch were traditionally used for roofing. Modern houses may have roofs of galvanized iron sheets, tejas (curved ceramic tiles) or other materials.

The Chota valley has recently become the site of much community tourism, in which travelers can live with families and experience the valley's culture, its unique Spanish and bomba music. The change in economy since 2000 has brought in many mestizo business-owners without providing much involvement or direct work for the traditional valley residents.

== Notable people ==
- Jhon Minda (born 1986), footballer

== See also ==
- Afro-Ecuadorian people
- Bomba (Ecuador)
- Chota Valley dialect

== Bibliography ==
(Ref: permission of: Angelique, Stephen, Iceman Gone; Gibbs, James, "Japan Traveler" magazine)

- Lipski, John M. (1987). "The Chota Valley: Afro-Hispanic Language in Highland Ecuador". Latin American Research Review. 22 (1): 155–170. ISSN 0023-8791. JSTOR 2503546.
