= Fresia Saavedra =

Ecuadorian singer-songwriter (1933–2024)

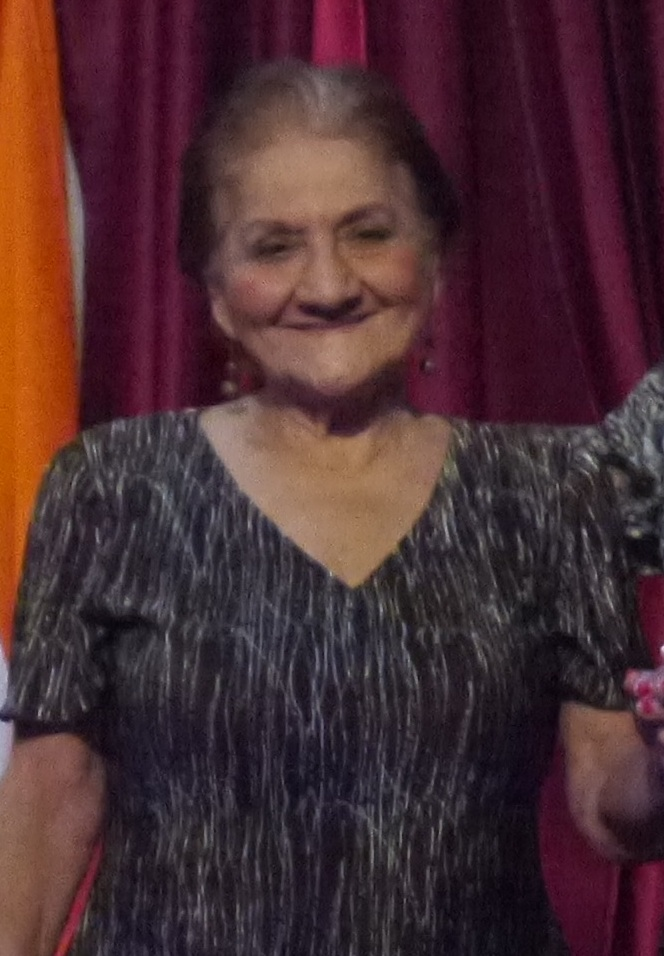

Background information
- Born: Fresia Raquel Saavedra Gómez; 8 September 1933; Guayaquil, Ecuador
- Died: 18 July 2024 (aged 90) Guayaquil, Ecuador
- Genres: Pasillo
- Occupation(s): Teacher, singer-songwriter
- Instruments: Vocals
- Years active: 1945–2024
- Spouse: Washington Murillo

Fresia Raquel Saavedra Gómez (8 September 1933 – 18 July 2024) was an Ecuadorian teacher and singer-songwriter. She was well known for her song "El ladrón" and for being politically and culturally active in Guayaquil through her music. In UNESCO's representative list of pasillo singing, it includes a video of a lesson by Saavedra. Pasillo was included in the Intangible Cultural Heritage of Humanity in 2021.

== Career ==
Fresia Raquel Saavedra Gómez was born in the city of Guayaquil on 8 September 1933. Her parents were Susana Gómez and Julio Saavedra. Her father, a violinist, took her at age five to sing at a radio station. In 1945, by the time Saavedra was twelve she was being paid monthly by Radio Cóndor to sing.

Saavedra composed tunes using a recorder. There are over three dozen, with "El ladrón" ("The Thief") being one of the best-known.

Saavedra made her first recording, Amor Perdido, then went on to record with Blanca Palomeque under the name Las Porteñitas. The well-known singer Julio Jaramillo recorded his first songs as duets with her. She was also known for writing marches for political figures to use during elections. She wrote campaign songs for several, including Abdalá Bucaram, Sixto Durán Ballén and José María Velasco Ibarra.

In 2013, when she was eighty, a musical celebration was held in her honour at the Teatro Centro de Arte (Art Center Theater), and when she got up to sing, the audience also stood to honor her. She said she had lost count of how many songs she had recorded. She had retired from teaching in school, but she was still helping aspiring singers at the Escuela del Pasillo, which is part of the Julio Jaramillo Music Museum.

In August 2015 her career was recognised when she was given a medal by Ecuador's Ministry of Culture together with Guillermo Rodríguez. Eduardo Miño, Danilo Miño, Consuelo Vargas, Sofocles Coello, Eduardo Morales, Victor Galarza and Naldo Campos.

In 2018 she and her daughter sang at the Museum de Pasillo in Quito, where people had gathered to recognise the 87-year-old singer Héctor Jaramillo.

UNESCO's representative list of pasillo singing includes a video of a lesson by Saacedra. Pasillo was included in the Intangible Cultural Heritage of Humanity in 2021.

Saavedra gave her final performance in February 2024 at the Galápagos Islands.

== Personal life ==
Saavedra married Washington Murillo, and in 1951 her daughter Hilda Murillo was born. When Hilda was seven she was singing with the Orquesta América and when she was nine she and her mother were singing duets.

In June 2024, Saavedra was hospitalised in Guayaquil after suffering a fall. She was later diagnosed with pneumonia and soon became comatose. She died from kidney and liver failure on 18 July 2024, at the age of 90. She also had diabetes and cirrhosis at the time of her death.
