= Ecuadorian rock =

Music genre in Ecuador

Ecuadorian rock encompasses a broad and diverse independent music scene. The genre involves different styles including hardcore punk, metalcore, gothic metal, heavy metal, alternative rock, punk, ska, blues, and grunge.

== Recognition and acceptance of the genre ==
Rock music is widely listened to and enjoyed in Ecuador, however, some forms of the genres are not broadly accepted in certain more conservative sectors of Ecuadorian society where there can be a great deal of prejudice toward the genre. Until the midst of the 1990s rockeros of all kinds have been discriminated against. Consequently, a powerful alliance of segments of the Catholic Church, the police and other government institutions has been formed against rock music. Even in the new millennium the official media discourse is highly discriminative against the rockeros. This is evidently shown by the reactions towards the tragedy of a fire blaze which broke out in the nightclub Factory in Quito on April 19, 2008, during a gothic rock festival "Ecuador gótico" and an awards ceremony. In this fire at least 19 people died and 24 were injured. In the flames all members of the band "Zelestial" were literally wiped out. Particularly significant was the reaction in the daily press. Although there was great sympathy with the victims, their families and friends, on the other hand some journalists – such as Jorge Ortiz in "Hora" or Fernando Ehlers in "La TV" argued that the tragedy had been the result of the "satanic practices", vandalism and the morbid gothic cultures of the rockeros and metaleros. Nevertheless, rock continues to be a popular genre in the country.

Unlike Argentina or Mexico, which have dedicated rock record labels, Ecuador lacks a music industry that supports Ecuadorian rock bands. This is an issue of the Ecuadorian music industry that as a whole has had relatively limited support and investment. Although, in recent years, a small rock music industry has developed in Ecuador, many Ecuadorian bands believe the lack of a strong local music industry is the primary reason that Ecuadorian rock music has not found international commercial success.

== Influences on the development of Ecuadorian rock ==
Rock music was introduced to Ecuadorian audiences in the late 1950s through radio and television music programs. The primary influences on the evolution of Ecuadorian rock were Mexican and Argentine rock; however, the political environment during the Ecuadorian revolution of the 1960s also influenced the genre. The Hippies are recognized as one of the first Ecuadorian rock groups. Since the midst of the 1990s several mestizo-bands in Ecuador made use of indigenous musical elements in rock music. Rocola Bacalao integrated Andean rhythms and made in their song-texts references to emblematic indigenous towns, such as Pujilí in Cotopaxi. Sal y Mileto and Cacería de Lagartos coined the genre of new Ecuadorian Rock. Nevertheless, in the 1980s and the early 1990s the rhythm of the social as expressed in Ecuadorian rock was characterized by hopelessness and resistance or even resignation against repression. With the emergence of a powerful indigenous movement organized in the Conaie the rhythm changed. The most emblematic references towards the political impact of the indigenous movement are made by the metalband Aztra and the hardcore band CURARE at the beginning of the 2000s, during the heyday of indigenous social protest against neoliberalism and for (ethnic) democratization.

== Health promotion messages in Ecuadorian rock ==
In recent years, Ecuadorian rock groups have collaborated with non-governmental organisations (NGOSs) to promote health messages targeted at young people. In 2005, Cacería de Lagartos (Lizard Hunt), partnered with the Ecuadorian Red Cross to create an education campaign promoting HIV awareness.
