= Sanjuanito =

Ecuadorian Music Genre

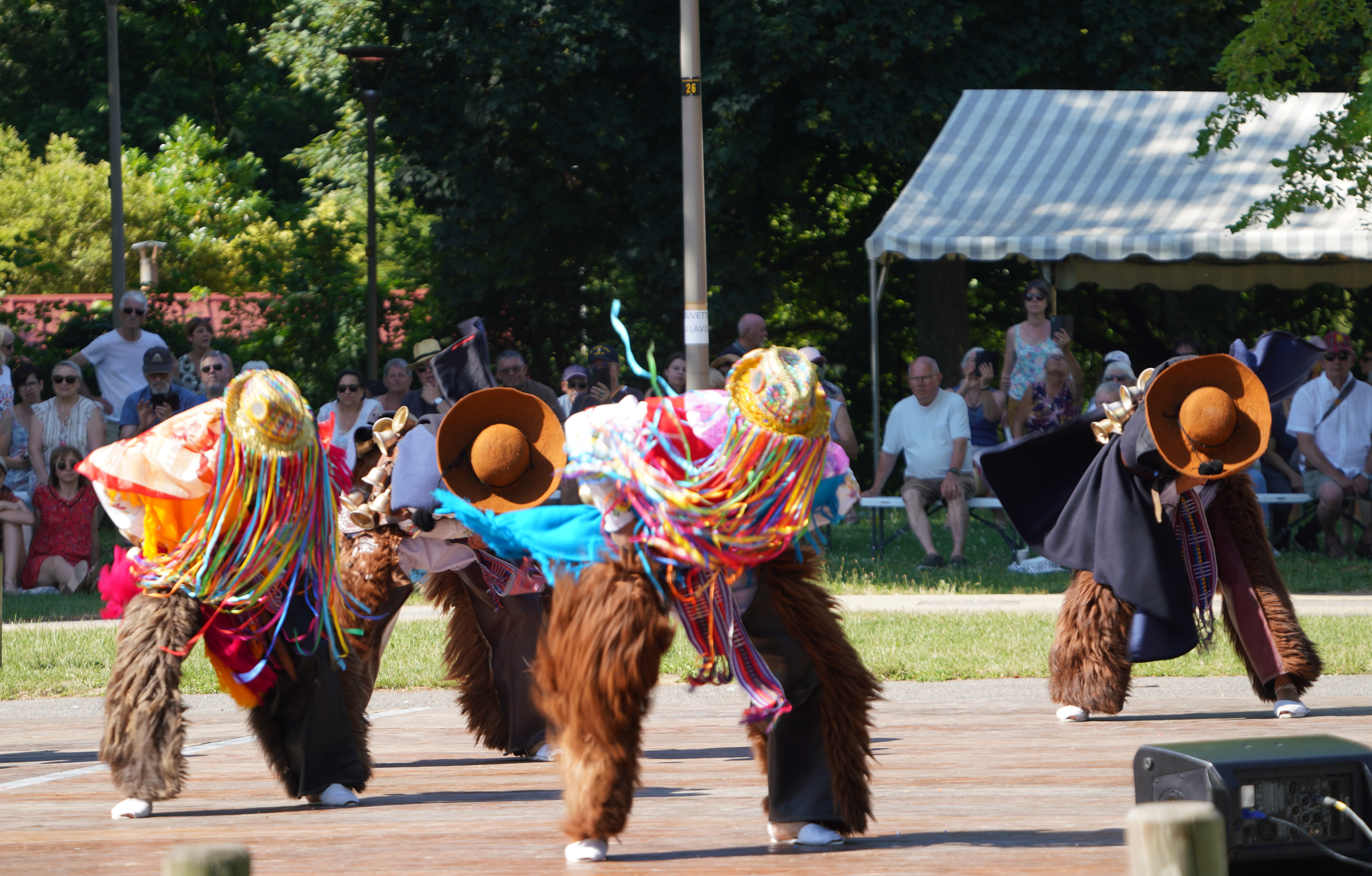
Ecuadorian dance troupe performing at Sacre du folklore 2023, a representation of Sanjuanito folkloric tradition.

A Sanjuanito, Sanjuan, or San Juan is a type of Ecuadorian music and dance. Sanjuanitos are an indigenous form of music and folkloric dance associated with the Sierra, Ecuador's mountainous Andean region. It's associated with, but not specific to, the Otavalo people.

== Background ==
This type of music is associated with "Las Fiestas de San Juan", which translates in English to the Celebration of Saint John's Eve. It's typically celebrated on June 24, the same day as Inti Raymi, a traditional ceremony from Incan times that coincides with the June solstice. Inti Raymi is a ritual observed in the Ecuadorian highlands where people give thanks to "Pachamama", or "Mother Earth", and Inti, the sun god, for a good harvest and agricultural blessings. While the name "San Juan", in English "St. John", relates back to Catholicism, the festivities aren't necessarily associated with the saint. Another hypothesis behind the name "sanjuanito" is that it's derived from Peru's Huayno or Huaynito.

Up until the 1990s, Sanjuanitos were mainly associated with the working class, particularly lower-class mestizos and indigenous people. Meanwhile, the title "musica nacional" or national music was reserved for the elite class' preferences and definition of Ecuadorian music, as was the case for Pasillos. Nonetheless, sanjuanitos are like other mestizo genres and the result of many musical, social, and cultural elements fusing and influencing one another throughout history.

== Style ==
Sanjuanitos gained popularity at the start of the 20th Century with their pentatonic based melodies, binary meter, and use of minor mode. The music is written in 2/4 time and favors high-pitched vocal and instrumental timbres.

Lyrics for this genre tend to be about everyday life, with more modern sanjuanitos discussing international migration as well as indigenous pride and unity. Modern sanjuanitos also have incorporated the use of electric guitars, electric bass, synthesizers, and drum kits. The term "chichera" music has also been used to describe these modern, and previously older, sanjuanitos, but it's often used as a pejorative label that signals indigeneity negatively, bad musical taste, or a general inferiority. The most popular example of a "chichera" song is "El Conejito" by Los Conquistadores, which while popular, received intense scrutiny by the Ecuadorian elites. This song's popularity was then followed by the rise in success of Angel Guaraca and Bayronn Caicedo.

Indigenous sanjuanitos see participants form a circle and dance around the central musicians in a ritual context. It features heterophonic melodies repeated with slight variations played by two indigenous flutes and accompanied by a bombo. Mestizo sanjuanitos include more instrumentation, such as the guitar, accordion, violin, and flute.

Another type of sanjuanitos are those played by Pan-Andean Folkloric ensembles. This type of sanjuanito has a greater fokloric image to it than urban popular music ones. This specific branch can feature a quena, guitar, panpipe, and bombo.

== Instrumentation ==
While there is some variation between sanjuanitos, they generally consist of wind instruments, particularly flutes and panpipes, guitars, and or brass bands to varying extents. Sanjuanitos are a mixture of at least some of the following instruments:

- Quena
- Pinkillu
- Bombo
- Guitar
- Harmonica
- Bandolin
- Melodica
- Rondador
- Charango
- Violin
