= Nicasio Safadi =

Ecuadorian musician

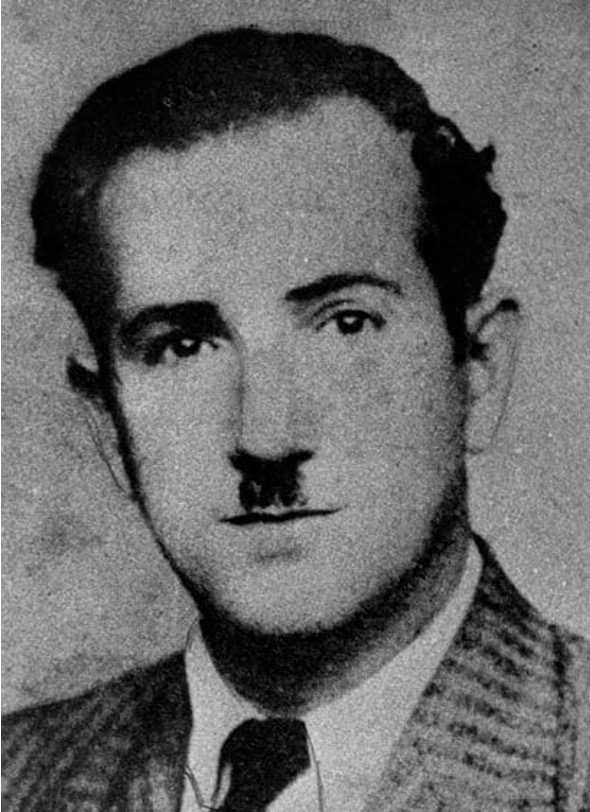
Portrait of Nicasio Safadi Reves.

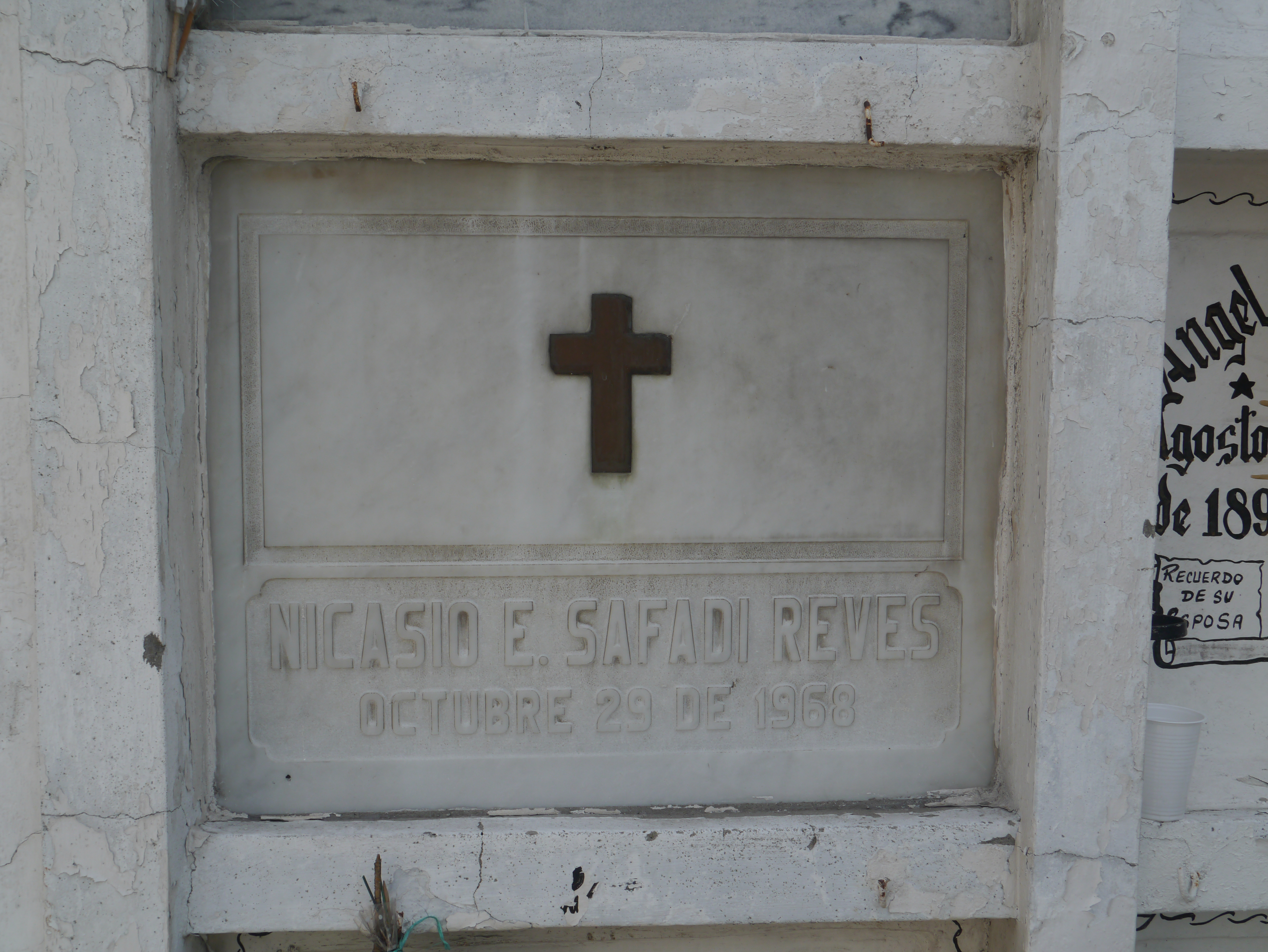
Vault of Nicasio Safadi, Guayaquil composer in the General Cemetery of Guayaquil.

Nicasio Safadi Reves (Reves is the translation of Rbeiz) (1902 – October 29, 1968 in Guayaquil) was an Ecuadorian musician

Born in the Ottoman Empire, he went to Ecuador when he was five years old. He learnt to play the vihuela, the tiple, the guitar, the lute and the mandolin. He was in several musical groups before he joined Enrique Ibáñez in "Dúo Ecuador".
