= Rondador =

Ecuadorian wind instrument

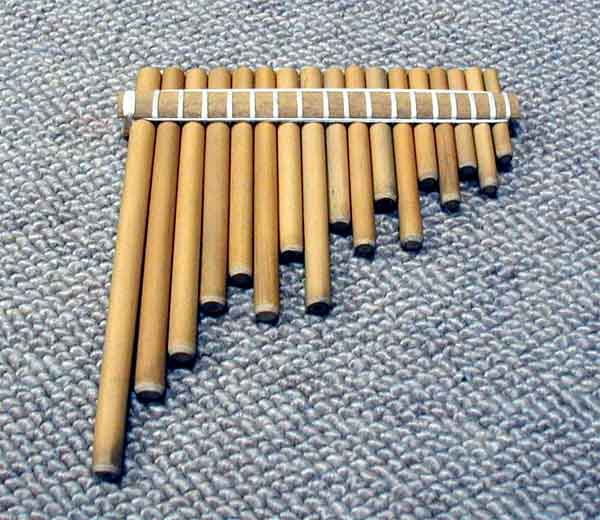
Rondador

The rondador is a set of chorded cane panpipes that produces two tones simultaneously. It consists of pieces of cane, placed side by side in order by size and closed at one end, and is played by blowing across the top of the instrument. The rondador is considered the national instrument of Ecuador. Further knowledge on the instrument is required, as the musical scale of which note each tube played projects is unknown.
