= Bomba (Ecuador) =

Afro-Ecuadorian music and dance form

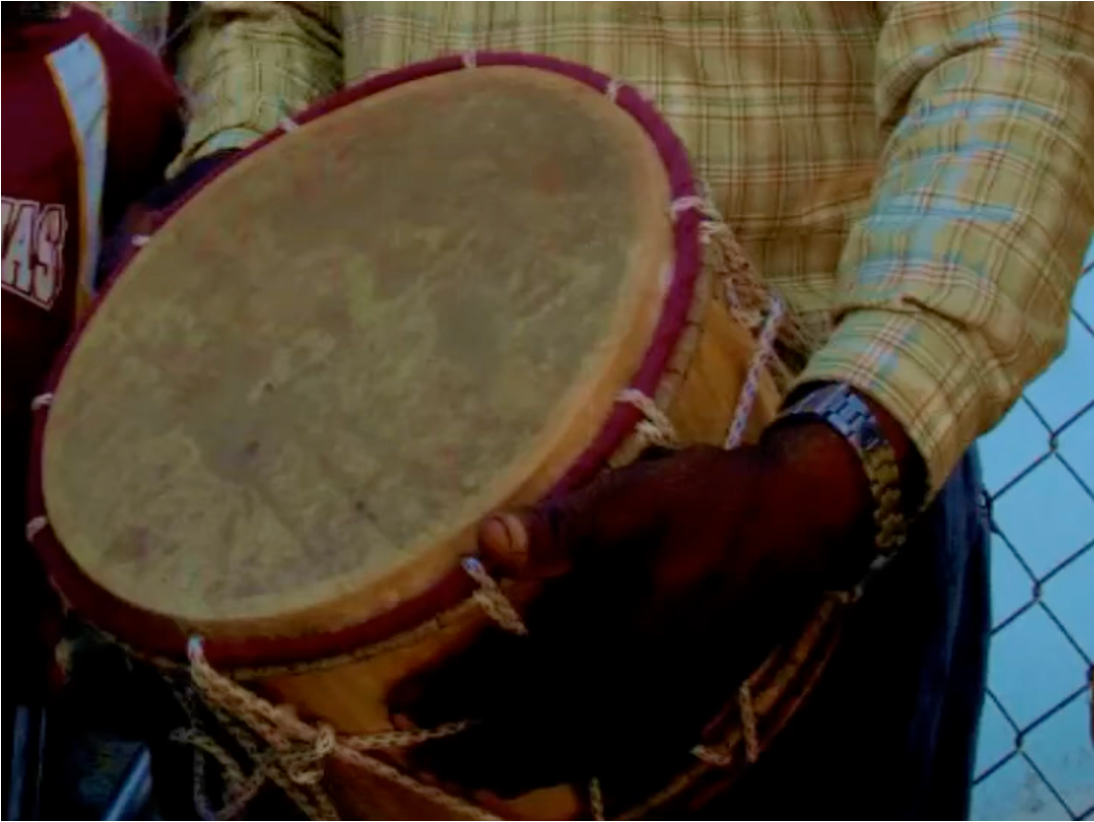
Bomba, a drum used in the musical genre of the same name.

Bomba or Bomba del Chota is an Afro-Ecuadorian music and dance form from the Chota Valley area of Ecuador in the province of Imbabura and Carchi. Its origins can be traced back to Africa via the middle passage and the use of African slave labor during the country's colonial period. Africans brought to labor as slaves in Ecuador brought with them this music form heavily influenced from the Bantu cultures of the Congo. The people dance in pairs to the drums and use improvisation to build relationships between the dancer and lead drummer.

This music and dance tends to have a prominent Spanish, mestizo and indigenous influence in the melodies. It could go from a mid tempo to a very fast rhythm. It is usually played with guitars along with the main local instrument which is also called bomba which is a drum along with a guiro and sometimes bombos and bongos. A variation of it is la banda mocha which are groups that play bomba with a bombo, guiro and plant leaves to give melody.

Recently it is enjoying some national exposure but outside the Chota Valley it is mostly popular in cities such as Quito and Ibarra which have important concentrations of afro-chotan people. In these cities sometimes it is played in discothèques and has some public performances as well as popularity among mestizo and indigenous people.

The word bomba is most likely of Bantu origin.

== List of most popular bomba bands ==
- Edgar Gonzalon "Negrito de la Salsa"
- La Banda Mocha
- Marabu
- Mario Polo
- Mario Congo
- Nery Padilla
- Oro Negro
- Poder Negro
- Eddy More

== See also ==
- Afro-Ecuadorian
