= Pasillo =

Music genre

Pasillo (English: little step, hallway or aisle) is an Ecuadorean and Colombian genre of music popular in the territories that composed the 19th century Viceroyalty of New Granada: Born in the Andes during the independence wars, it spread to other areas; especially Ecuador (where it is considered the national musical style) and, to a lesser extent, the mountainous regions of Venezuela and Panama. Venezuelans refer to this style of music as "vals" (Spanish for "Waltz"). Today, it has incorporated more European features of classical dance, such as Viennese waltz in Colombia and features of sanjuanito and yaraví in Ecuador. As it spread during the Gran Colombia period, pasillo also absorbed the individual characteristics of isolated villages. This gives it an eclectic feel; however, the style, tone, and tempo of the music differ in each village and indeed between each country.

In its waltz, pasillo alters the classically European dance form to accompany guitar, mandolin, and other string instruments.

UNESCO's representative list of the Intangible Cultural Heritage of Humanity includes Pasillo from 2021.

== History ==
Invented in the 19th century, pasillo became closely associated with the Colombian War of Independence, the Ecuadorian War of Independence, and Ecuadorian nationalism. Pasillo gained popularity from the recordings of the duet "Ecuador", once performed by Enrique Ibañez Mora and Nicasio Safadi. It reached its international apex during the career of Julio Jaramillo.

Younger generations of Ecuadorians still enjoy pasillos, including new styles sung by Juan Fernando Velasco and Margarita Lazo. Some Ecuadorian pasillos include "Pasional", "Invernal", "Ángel de Luz", "El aguacate", and many others. Pasillo has been a very popular style of music in Colombia since the 19th century. Famous Colombian pasillos include "Espumas", "Pueblito viejo", "Pescador lucero y río", and "Oropel". Colombian artists, such as Silva y Villalba and Garzon y Collazos, have helped popularize pasillo around the world.

== In Ecuador ==
Ecuadorian pasillo adds the influence of sanjuanito, so Ecuadorian pasillo is slow and melancholic. Differing from other countries, Ecuadorian pasillo became a national music symbol. According to author Ketty Wong, since the beginning of the 20th century the Ecuadorian pasillo stopped being a festive genre played in saloons and bands became more popular. It had many singles with melancholic texts referring to nostalgic and brokenhearted feelings. However, there are also songs expressing the beauty of Ecuadorian landscapes, the beauty of Ecuadorian women, and the bravery of the Ecuadorian people. In addition, there are songs which reflect admiration for a region or a city, and in some places these have become even more representative than their own city anthems. This is the case of "Guayaquil de mis amores" by Nicasio Safadi. Wong asserts that in Ecuador, due to its capacity of integrating and producing different topics between different social, ethnic, and generational groups, the Ecuadorian pasillo has become the representation of national music by excellence.

During the 1950s the Ecuadorian pasillo went through a transition. Although it was still the national music of Ecuador, with the arrival of the radio it was forced to compete with foreign boleros, tangos, waltzes, guarachas, and other styles of tropical music, such as guaracha, merecumbe, and the Ecuadorian-Colombian cumbia. The continued strength of the Ecuadorian pasillo is in thanks to the performances of great singers such as the duet Luis Alberto Valencia and Gonzalo Benítez, the Montecel brothers, the Mendoza Sangurima sisters, the Mendoza Suasti sisters, Los Coraza and Marco Tulio Hidrobo.

Nowadays, Ecuadorian pasillo is a national icon, and younger generations are adding new styles, thus supporting wide-scale distribution.

== Composers ==
- Julio Jaramillo
- Fresia Saavedra
- Carlos Amable Ortiz
- Francisco Paredes Herrera
- Adolfo Mejía Navarro
- Olga Eljuri de Villar
- Nicasio Safadi
- José Ignacio Canelos
- Enrique Ibáñez Mora
- Carlota Jaramillo
- Luis Laberto Valencia
- Gonzalo Benitez
- Tulio Hidrobo
- Julio Baba
- Enrique Espín Yépez
- Vicente Gómez Gudiño
- Jacobo Palm
- José Luis Rodríguez Vélez
- Carlos Vieco
- German Dario Perez
- Oriol Rangel
- Luis Antonio Calvo
- Luis Henrique Santos Goncalves

== Example ==
Adoracion Text: Genaro Castro Music: Enrique Ibáñez Mora

Adoracion
Soñé ser tuyo y en mi afán tenerte
presa en mis brazos para siempre mía;
pero nunca soñé que he de perderte
que a otro mortal la dicha sonreía.

Soñé a mi lado para siempre verte,
siendo tu único dueño, vida mía;
soñé que eras mi diosa, más la suerte,
nuevos tormentos para mí tenía.

Soñé que de tus labios dulcemente,
me diste tu palabra candorosa,
hablándome de amor eternamente.

Pero todo es en vano, sólo ha sido
un sueño la pasión que me devora,
al ver que para siempre te he perdido.
