= Anti-Mexican sentiment =

Prejudice against Mexico

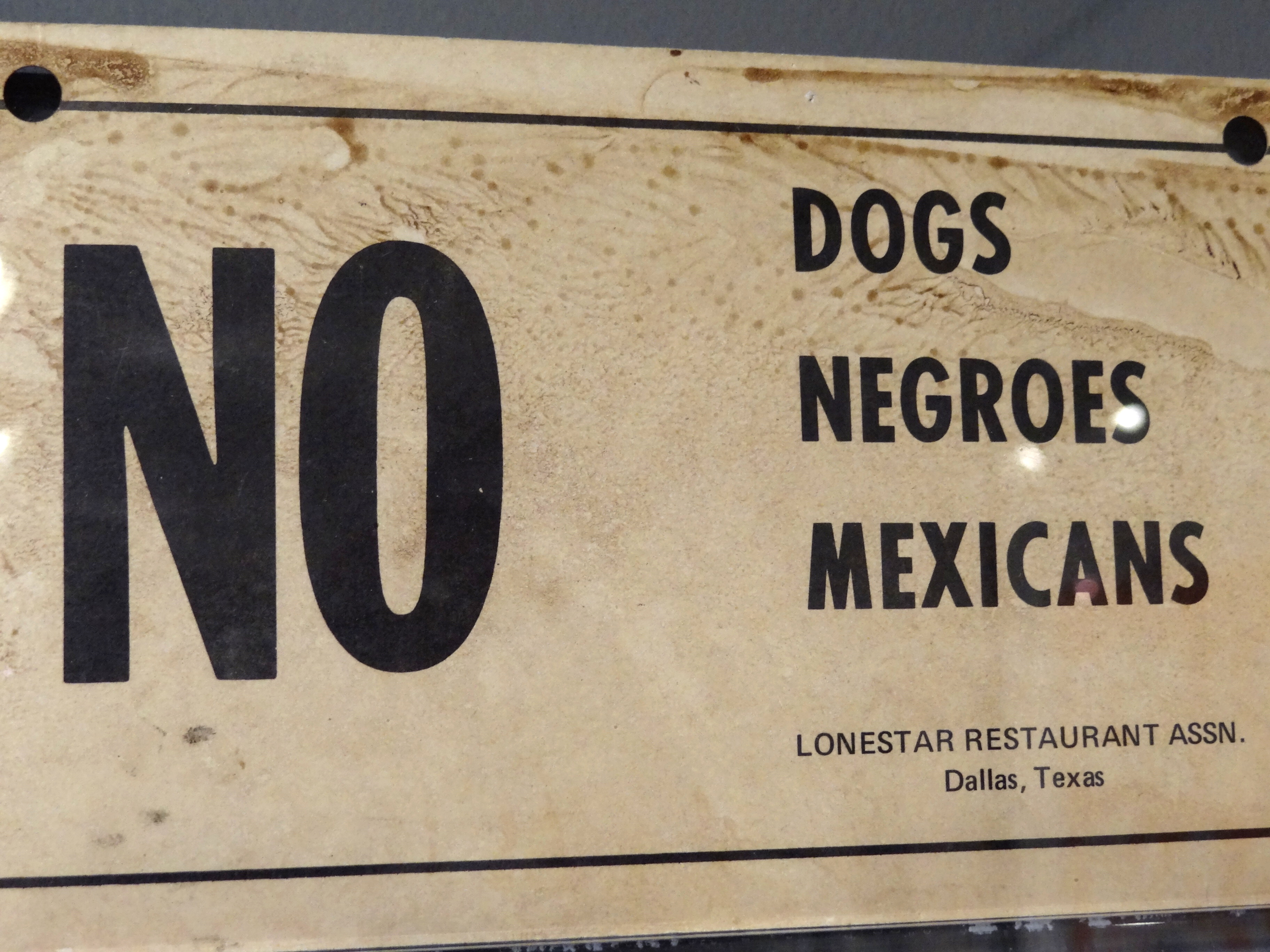
"No Dogs, Negroes, Mexicans" was a policy enforced by the Lonestar Restaurant Association throughout Texas.

Anti-Mexican sentiment (Spanish: sentimiento antimexicano) is prejudice, fear, discrimination, xenophobia, racism, or hatred towards Mexico, its people, and their culture.

Anti-Mexican sentiment ranges from animosity toward the actions of the Mexican government and contempt for culture to discrimination against the people. This sentiment is evident in various countries in the Americas (notably the United States and the countries of Central America), although cases of "Mexicanophobia" (mexicanofobia) can also be seen outside the continent.

== Asia ==
=== China ===
Although largely forgotten by Mexican society, resentment toward Mexicans existed in China due to the 1911 Torreón massacre, where 300 migrants of Chinese origin died.

During the 2009 swine flu pandemic, relations between the two countries cooled considerably after Beijing quarantined approximately seventy Mexican citizens, even though none of them showed symptoms of the virus. Some Chinese also expressed anti-Mexican sentiment in the wake of the outbreak. The Mexican government responded with outrage.

=== Israel ===
In the 2009 pandemic, Israel was one of the countries that referred to it as the "Mexican flu," which led to discrimination against Mexican residents in the country.

In 2017, Mexico and Israel experienced minor tensions after then-Israeli Prime Minister Benjamin Netanyahu tweeted his support for the construction of the border wall with the United States. However, Netanyahu maintained that it was a temporary situation and that diplomatic relations would remain stable.

== Americas ==
=== Argentina ===
In June 2021, the then-President of Argentina, Alberto Fernández, allegedly stated that "Mexicans came from the indigenous people, Brazilians came from the jungle, but we Argentinians arrived on ships, and these were ships that came from Europe, and that's how we built our society." This statement sparked outrage on social media, with Fernández facing harsh criticism for his words.

During the 2022 FIFA World Cup, prior to the match between the Mexican and Argentinian national teams in the group stage, xenophobic incidents were reported between the two nations, including derogatory insults such as salta muros ("wall jumpers")—referring to Mexicans who illegally cross the border into the U.S.— and monos ("monkeys") directed at Mexican fans, as well as references to the Falklands War in the case of derogatory comments against Argentinian fans.

In May 2024, an Argentine journalist made a derogatory comment, saying "there is nothing uglier than Mexicans," which generated controversy in several internet media outlets.

=== Bolivia ===
Bilateral relations between Mexico and Bolivia are excellent and strong, although there were some complications in 2019. After the discovery of electoral fraud by the ruling Movimiento al Socialismo (MAS) party of former Bolivian President Evo Morales—which his supporters had thus far denounced as a "coup d'état"—former Mexican President Andrés Manuel López Obrador granted him political asylum. With the transition of Jeanine Áñez to the presidency of Bolivia, relations began to deteriorate; Áñez declared that "I feel sorry for Mexicans," and also expelled the Mexican ambassador to Bolivia, María Teresa Mercado.

Some right-wing politicians opposed to the ruling left-wing MAS government in Bolivia have referred to a small town in the tropical Chapare Province region as México chico ("Little Mexico"), using derogatory and comparative terms. This town is considered a clandestine location where stolen vehicles from Chile are stored.

=== Ecuador ===
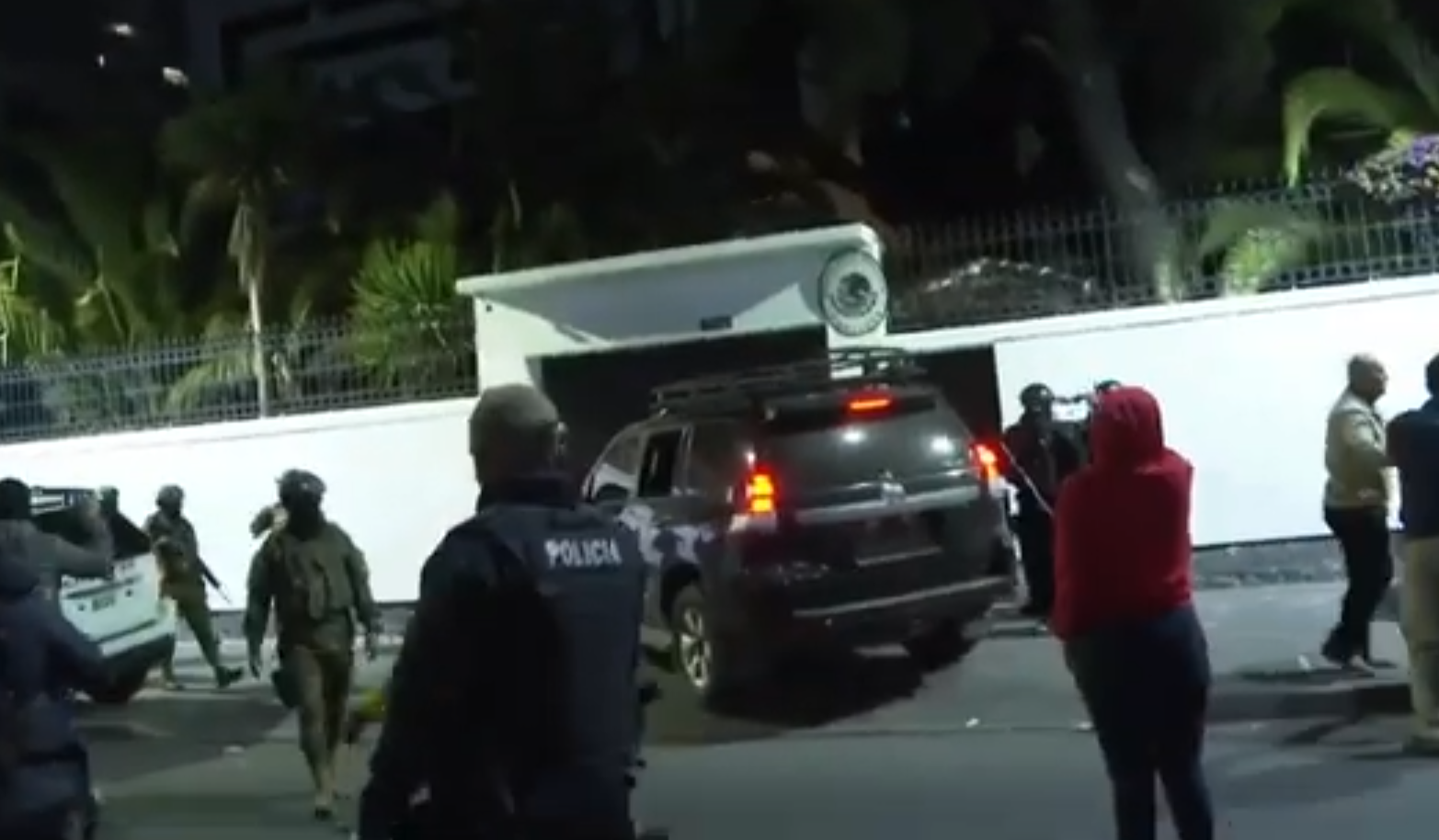
Police outside the Mexican embassy in Quito

On 5 April 2024, the Mexican embassy in Quito was raided by Ecuadorian police and military forces. Mexico and numerous other countries decried the raid as a violation of the 1961 Vienna Convention on Diplomatic Relations and the 1954 Caracas Convention on Diplomatic Asylum.

The assault led to Mexico severing its relations with Ecuador. The following day, Nicaragua followed suit in solidarity with Mexico. Venezuela closed its embassy and consulates in Ecuador due to the raid, condemning Ecuador's actions.

=== Guatemala ===
In December 1958, both nations were very close to declaring war on each other after an incident involving the Guatemalan navy firing upon Mexican fishing boats off the coast of Guatemala and killing three fisherman and wounding fourteen others. Soon after the attack diplomatic relations were severed and troops were mobilized to the border on both sides and Mexican fighter planes entered Guatemalan airspace to attack the country's main international airport, however, just before the attack was to take place, newly elected Mexican President Adolfo López Mateos called off the attack. In September 1959, with the mediation of Brazil and Chile; diplomatic relations between Guatemala and Mexico were re-established. This incident was known as the Mexico–Guatemala conflict.

=== United States ===
Its origins in the United States date back to the Mexican and American Wars of Independence and the struggle over the disputed Southwestern territories. That struggle would eventually lead to the Mexican–American War in which the defeat of Mexico caused a great loss of territory. In the 20th century, anti-Mexican sentiment continued to grow after the Zimmermann Telegram, an incident between the Mexican government and the German Empire during World War I.

==== 1840s–1890s ====
Prior to 1854, a significant portion of the western United States, encompassing much of Arizona, California, Colorado, Nevada, New Mexico, Texas, Utah, and Wyoming, was indeed part of Mexico. Through a combination of war, treaties, and land acquisitions, approximately 100,000 Mexicans found themselves under U.S. jurisdiction. In what had once been their homeland, these newly minted Mexican-American citizens encountered racial discrimination, which included the loss of property, meager wages, and instances of lynching. However, during the Great Depression of the 1920s, it is estimated that around 80,000 Mexicans were deported back to Mexico each year, resulting in the fragmentation of Mexican families and communities.

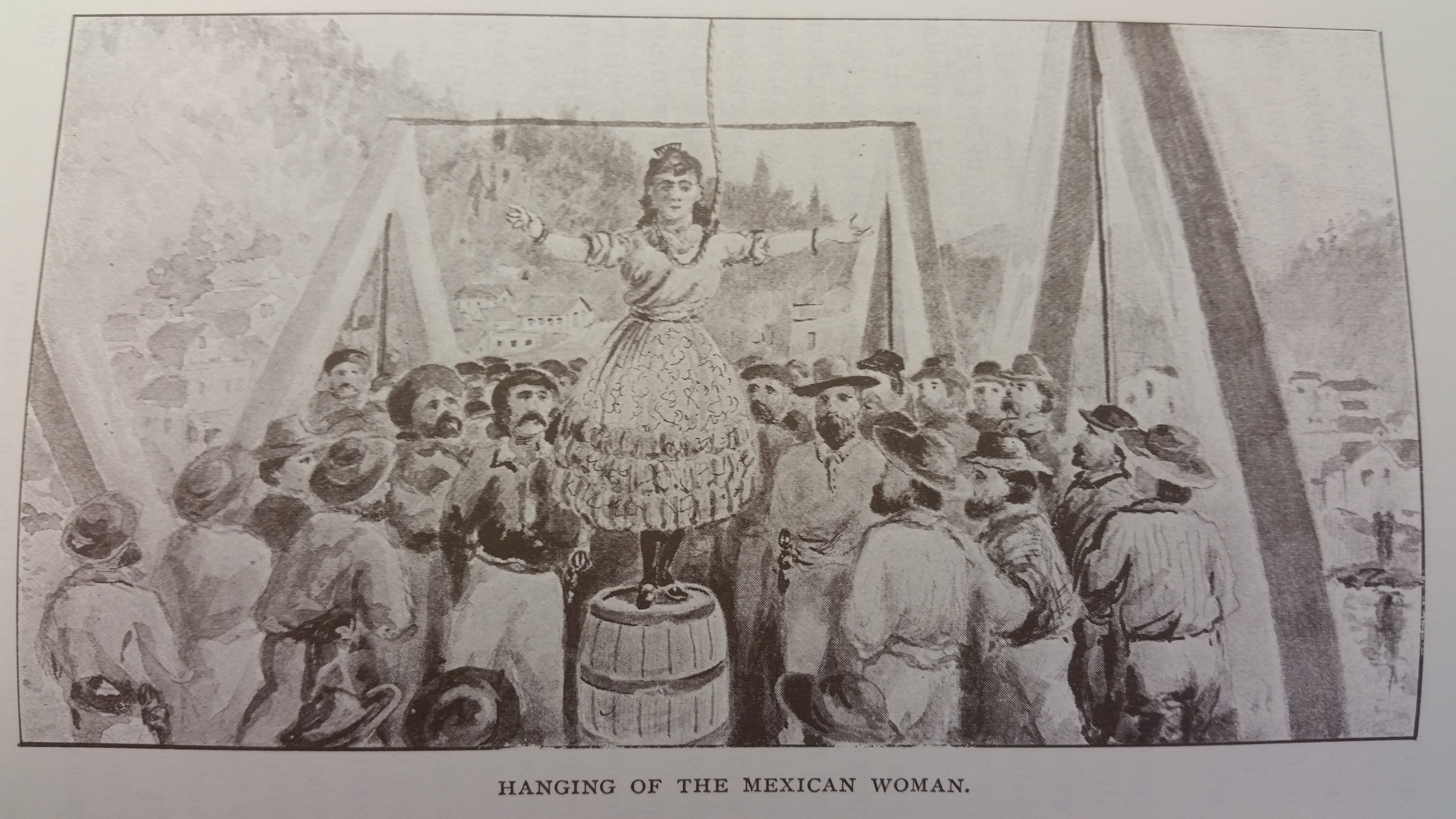
The hanging of Josefa Segovia (Juanita) in Downieville 1851. In complete disregard of her identity, she came to be known as "Juanita" after her death, a stereotypical name for a Mexican woman.

Due to the result of the Texas Revolution (1835-1836) and Texas Annexation (1845), the U.S. inherited the Republic of Texas's border disputes with Mexico, which led to the eruption of the Mexican–American War (1846–1848). After the defeat of Mexico, it was forced to sign the Treaty of Guadalupe Hidalgo. The treaty required Mexico to cede almost half its land to the United States in exchange for 15 million dollars but also guaranteed that Mexican citizens living in ceded lands would retain full property rights and be granted American citizenship if they remained in the ceded lands for at least one year. The treaty and others led to the establishment in 1889 of the International Boundary and Water Commission, which was tasked with maintaining the border, allocating river waters between the two nations, and providing for flood control and water sanitation.

The lynching of Mexican-Americans in the American Southwest has long been overlooked in U.S. history. That may be because the Tuskegee Institute files and reports, which contain the most comprehensive lynching records in the US, categorized Mexican, Chinese, and Native American lynching victims and white as well. Statistics of reported lynching in the United States indicate that between 1882 and 1951, 4,730 persons were lynched, 1,293 of whom were white and 3,437 black. The actual number of Mexicans lynched is unknown. William D. Carrigan and Clive Webb estimate that between 1848 and 1928, at least 597 Mexicans were lynched, of which 64 in areas that lacked a formal judicial system. One particularly infamous lynching occurred on July 5, 1851, when a Mexican woman, Josefa Segovia, was lynched by a mob in Downieville, California. She was accused of killing a man who had attempted to assault her after he had broken into her home.

Law enforcement conducted a considerable amount of these murders; therefore, the malefactors seldom stood trial for lynching Mexican people. Mexicans were lynched for various reasons such as job competition, speaking Spanish too loudly in a public setting, romantically advancing towards white women, acknowledging the Anglo system of cultural difference, and much more.

During the California Gold Rush, right after California became a state of the United States, violence against Mexicans increased. White miners begrudged Mexican people.

==== 1900s–1930s ====
The Bisbee Deportation was the illegal deportation of about 1,300 striking mine workers, supporters, and citizen bystanders by 2,000 vigilantes on July 12, 1917. The workers and others were kidnapped in the town of Bisbee, Arizona, and held at a local baseball park. They were then loaded onto cattle cars and transported 200 miles (320 km) for 16 hours through the desert without food or water. The deportees were unloaded at Hermanas, New Mexico, without money or transportation and were warned not to return to Bisbee.

In 1911, a mob of over 100 people hanged a 14-year-old boy, Antonio Gómez, who while trying to escape from a mob that encircled him, killed a German man named Charles Zieschang; he was arrested for murder. Rather than let him serve time in jail, townspeople lynched him and dragged his body through the streets of Thorndale, Texas. Between 1910 and 1919, Texas Rangers were responsible for the deaths of hundreds to thousands of ethnic Mexicans in South Texas. The violence continued through the Porvenir Massacre on January 28, 1918, when Texas Rangers summarily executed 15 Mexicans in Presidio County, Texas. This caused State Representative José Canales to head an investigation into systematic violence against Mexicans by the Texas Rangers, which tried to end the pattern of violence and led to the dismissal of five rangers involved in the massacre.

The Mexican community (most having been on their land since before the Mex/American war and granted citizenship after the Treaty of Guadalupe Hidalgo was signed) has been the subject of widespread immigration raids. During the Great Depression, the US government sponsored Mexican Repatriation programs, which were intended to pressure people to move to Mexico, but many were deported against their will. 355,000 to 500,000 individuals were repatriated or deported; 40 to 60% of them US citizens - overwhelmingly children. In 1936, Colorado even ordered all of its "Mexicans," in reality, anyone who spoke Spanish or seemed to be of Latin descent, to leave the state, and it blockaded its southern border to keep people from going back. Though no formal decree was ever issued by immigration authorities, Immigration and Naturalization Service officials helped the expulsions.

==== 1940s–1960s ====
The Zoot Suit Riots were a series of racial attacks in June 1943 in Los Angeles, California, between Mexican youths and European American servicemen stationed in Southern California.

According to the National World War II Museum, between 250,000 and 500,000 Mexicans served in the United States Armed Forces during World War II and comprised 2.3% to 4.7% of the Army. The exact number, however, is unknown as Hispanics were then classified as whites. Generally, Mexican World War II servicemen were integrated into regular military units. However, many Mexican War veterans were discriminated against and even denied medical services by the US Department of Veterans Affairs when they arrived home. In 1948, the war veteran Dr Hector P. Garcia founded the American GI Forum (AGIF) to address the concerns of Mexican veterans who were being discriminated. The AGIF's first campaign was on the behalf of Felix Longoria, a Mexican private who was killed in the Philippines in the line of duty. Upon the return of his body to his hometown of Three Rivers, Texas, he was denied funeral services because he was Mexican.

In the 1940s, imagery in newspapers and crime novels portrayed Mexican zoot suiters as disloyal foreigners or murderers attacking non-Hispanic white police officers and servicemen. Opposition to zoot suiters sparked a series of attacks on young Mexican males in Los Angeles, which became known as the Zoot Suit Riots. The worst of the riots occurred on June 9, 1943 during which 5,000 servicemen and residents gathered in Downtown Los Angeles and attacked Mexicans, only some of whom were zoot suiters.

In Orange County, California, Mexican school children were subject to racial segregation in the public school system and forced to attend "Mexican schools." In 1947, Mendez v. Westminster was a ruling that declared that segregating children of "Mexican and Latin descent" in state-operated public schools in Orange County was unconstitutional. That helped lay the foundation for the landmark Brown v Board of Education, a case that ended racial segregation in the public schools.

In many counties in the southwestern United States, Mexicans were not selected as jurors in court cases that involved Mexican defendants. In 1954, Pete Hernandez, an agricultural worker, was indicted of murder by a jury that was all non-Hispanic white in Jackson County, Texas. Hernandez believed that the jury could not be impartial unless members of other races were allowed on the jury-selecting committees and noted a Mexican had not been on a jury for more than 25 years in that particular county. Hernandez and his lawyers decided to take the case to the US Supreme Court. The Hernandez v. Texas ruling declared that illegal Mexicans and other cultural groups in the United States are entitled to equal protection under the Fourteenth Amendment of the US Constitution.

Many organizations, businesses, and homeowners associations had official policies to exclude Mexicans. In many areas across the Southwest, Mexicans lived in separate residential areas because of laws and real estate company policies. The group of laws and policies, known as redlining, lasted until the 1950s and fell under the concept of official segregation.

==== 1970s–1990s ====
One of the most vicious cases occurred at the U.S.-Mexico border west of Douglas, Arizona, on August 18, 1976, when three Mexican campesinos who had crossed the border illegally, were attacked while they were crossing a ranch belonging to Douglas dairyman George Hanigan. The three were kidnapped, stripped, hogtied, and had their feet burned before they were cut loose and told to run back to Mexico. As the three men ran, the Hanigans shot birdshot into their backs. The three made it back across the border to Agua Prieta, Sonora, where the local police notified the Mexican consulate in Douglas, which lodged formal complaints against George Hanigan and his two sons. George Hanigan died of a heart attack at the age of 67 on March 22, 1977, one week before he and his sons were scheduled to go on trial. After three trials, one of the Hanigan sons was convicted in federal court and sentenced to three years, and the other was found not guilty.

In 1994, California state voters approved Proposition 187 by a wide majority. The initiative made undocumented immigrants ineligible for public health (except for emergencies), public social services, and public education. It required public agencies to report anyone they believed to be undocumented to either the INS (now ICE) or the California attorney general. It made it a felony to print, sell, or use false citizenship documents. Many Mexicans opposed such measures as reminiscent of ethnic discrimination before the Civil Rights Era and denounced the actions as illegal under state and federal laws, as well as international law involving the rights of foreign nationals in other countries. The initiative was eventually declared unconstitutional by the Ninth Circuit Court of Appeals in San Francisco.

==== 2000s–present ====
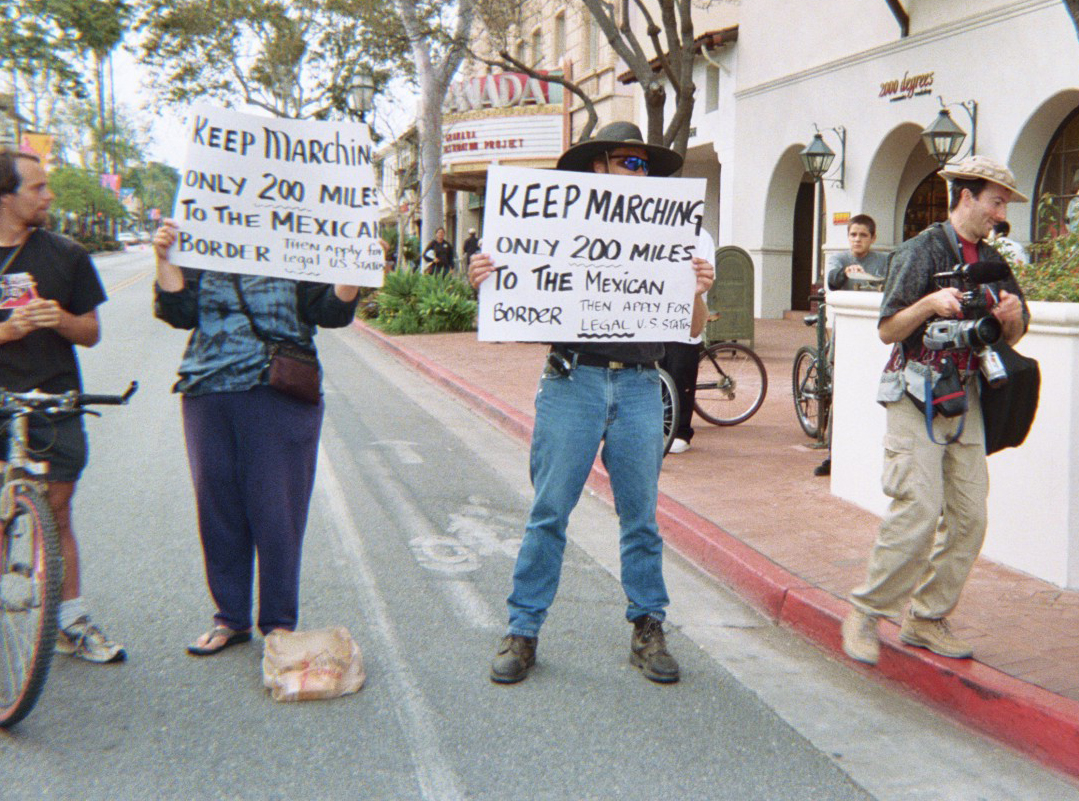
Anti-Mexican protesters in Santa Barbara, California, 2006.

As of July 2018, 37.0 million Americans, or 10.3% of the United States' population, identify themselves as being of full or partial Mexican ancestry; that was 61.9% of all Hispanics and Latinos in the United States. The US is home to the second-largest Mexican community in the world, second only to Mexico itself, and is over 24% of the entire Mexican-origin population of the world (Canada is a distant third with a small Mexican Canadian population of 96,055 or 0.3% of the population as of 2011). In addition, approximately 7,000,000 Mexicans lived undocumented in the United States in 2008. In 2012, the United States admitted 145,326 Mexican immigrants, and 1,323,978 Mexicans were waiting for a slot to open so that they could emigrate to the United States. A 2014 survey indicated that 34% of all Mexicans would immigrate to the United States if they could do so.

Some private citizen groups have been established to apprehend immigrants crossing undocumented into the United States. Such groups, like the Minuteman Project and other anti-immigration organizations, have been accused of discrimination because of their aggressive and illegal tactics.

As Mexicans make up most Latinos in the United States, when the non-Latino population is asked to comment on their perception of Latinos, it tends to think of stereotypes of Mexicans that are fueled by the media, which focus on undocumented immigration. In a 2012 survey conducted by the National Hispanic Media Coalition, one-third of non-Hispanics (Whites and Blacks) mistakenly believed that most of the nation's Hispanics were "illegal immigrants with large families and little education." The report has been criticized on the grounds that it makes the same mistake as the media in aggregating all Latinos into a single group, which misses both the diversity of the situations of the different groups and the varying perceptions of those groups by the non-Latino population.

From 2003 to 2007 in California, the state with the largest illegal Mexican population, the number of hate crimes against Mexicans almost doubled. Anti-Mexican feelings are sometimes directed also against other Latino nationalities even though anti-Mexican sentiment exists in some Caribbean and Latino groups.

American president Donald Trump has made anti-Mexican and anti-immigrant remarks. Trump falsely stated that Mexican immigrants were criminals, drug dealers and rapists. In the 2019 El Paso Walmart shooting, a white man who was a White nationalist terrorist shot and killed 22 and injured 26 Latinos in a Walmart in El Paso with a WASR-10 rifle. The white demographic decline was believed to be his motive for attacking Mexicans. Trump also made anti-Mexican racist remarks about Vanessa Guillén.

A domestic terrorist attack/mass shooting occurred on August 3, 2019 at a Walmart store in El Paso, Texas, and resulted in 23 people dead and 23 injured, 18 of which were Hispanic Americans and/or Mexicans. The white gunman, Patrick Crusius, told El Paso Police that he was trying to kill as many Mexicans as possible. In a manifesto, The Inconvenient Truth, published on 8chan just before the attacks, Crusius had cited several white nationalist beliefs such as a supposed "Hispanic invasion of Texas" and The Great Replacement conspiracy theory; stated that he was "simply trying to defend my country from cultural and ethnic replacement brought on by an invasion" (white genocide conspiracy theory), environmental degradation; contempt towards corporations, and their use of automation to replace workers. Crusius said that he was inspired in part by the 2019 Christchurch mosque shootings.

== Europe ==
=== Germany ===
Co-Author of the The Communist Manifesto, Friedrich Engels, in an 1849 essay, Democratic Pan-Slavism in the Neue Rheinische Zeitung favoured the American victory in the Mexican–American War, and the subsequent annexation of California from the "lazy Mexicans", arguing for U.S territorial expansion as a necessary force to spread civilization, and accelerate economic development, trade and what he viewed as historical progress:

And will Bakunin accuse the Americans of a "war of conquest", which, although it deals with a severe blow to his theory based on "justice and humanity", was nevertheless waged wholly and solely in the interest of civilization? Or is it perhaps unfortunate that splendid California has been taken away from the lazy Mexicans, who could not do anything with it? That the energetic Yankees by rapid exploitation of the California gold mines will increase the means of circulation, in a few years will concentrate a dense population and extensive trade at the most suitable places on the coast of the Pacific Ocean, create large cities, open up communications by steamship, construct a railway from New York to San Francisco, for the first time really open the Pacific Ocean to civilization, and for the third time in history give the world trade a new direction? The "independence" of a few Spanish Californians and Texans may suffer because of it, in someplaces "justice" and other moral principles may be violated; but what does that matter to such facts of world-historic significance?

=== France ===
Anti-Mexican sentiment in France grew shortly after the French defeat in the Second Franco-Mexican War in 1867, and later, after the dispute over the sovereignty of Clipperton Island (or Isla de la Pasión).

In 2024, the film Emilia Pérez premiered, which has been heavily criticized in Mexico for distorting the country's reality. The film opened at the Morelia International Film Festival in October of that year, where it drew a limited audience, and was released in Mexican theaters on January 23, 2025, grossing 9.4 million pesos in its opening weekend. The controversy intensified when director Jacques Audiard stated in an interview that he "had not studied the Mexican context in depth," although these statements, originally made in French, were being translated at the time by someone else. In another interview, Audiard asserted that "Spanish is a language of emerging countries, of modest countries, of poor people and migrants." He later claimed that his comments had been taken out of context and that, in fact, he has a great appreciation for the language.

=== Spain ===
In 2023, a Mexican woman witnessed two Spanish citizens mocking the Mexican accent among themselves. The woman recorded their voices and made a TikTok video denouncing the incident, which went viral and caused outrage among Mexican internet users.

=== United Kingdom ===
In 2011, television presenter Jeremy Clarkson, known for xenophobic rants, declared Mexicans to be "lazy" and "useless" drivers in an episode of his show Top Gear; the BBC apologized for his comments.

== See also ==
- Racism in the United States#Hispanic and Latino Americans
- Anti-Colombian sentiment
- Anti-Chilean sentiment
- Anti-Spanish sentiment
- Anti-Venezuelan sentiment
- Battle of Chavez Ravine
- East L.A. walkouts
- Hispanophobia
- La Matanza (1910–1920)
- United Farm Workers
