= Ecuador–Germany relations =

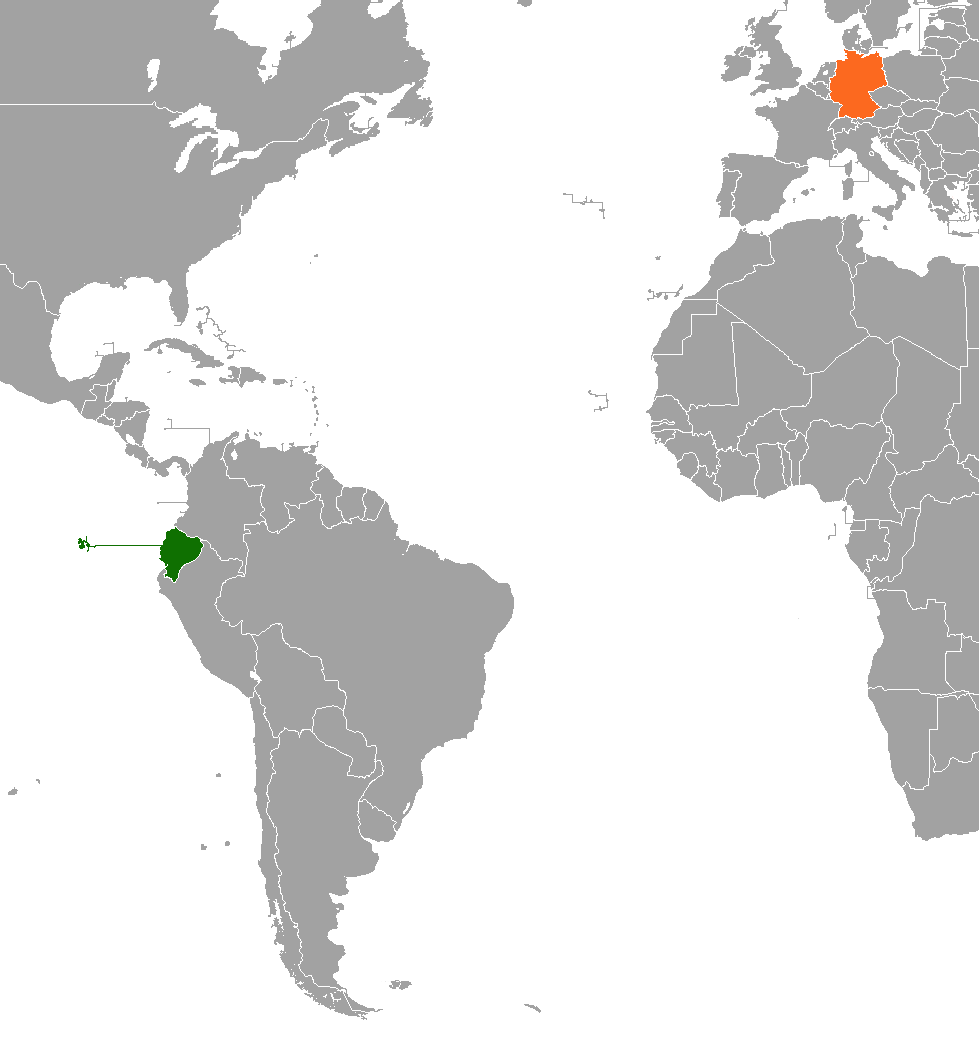

- Ecuador: Germany

Ecuador–Germany relations have existed since 1922, and in the 21st century they focus on development cooperation, environmental policy, trade and investment and education.

== History ==
In 1802, the explorer Alexander von Humboldt visited Ecuador with his traveling companion Aimé Bonpland and climbed the Chimborazo. In the second half of the 19th century, the volcanologist Wilhelm Reiss also visited the country. In 1870, the German Jesuit Theodor Wolf was appointed professor of geology and mineralogy at the Universidad Central del Ecuador, after whom the Wolf volcano on the Galápagos Islands was named. The German-Ecuadorian composer Antonio Neumane composed the melody Salve, Oh Patria, in the same year, which became the national anthem of Ecuador in 1886. The Weimar Republic opened a diplomatic mission in Ecuador in 1922. After Adolf Hitler came to power in Germany, Ecuador accepted nearly 3,000 to 4,000 Jewish refugees and persecutes of the Nazi regime between 1933 and 1945. During World War II, Ecuador broke off relations with Germany in 1942 and declared war on the Axis powers on February 2, 1945, though this was at most symbolic.

After the end of World War II, Ecuador established relations with the Federal Republic of Germany (FRG) in 1952, which opened a legation in Quito that was converted into an embassy three years later. In the 1960s, the FRG began development cooperation with the country. In 1965, the German Democratic Republic opened a trade mission in Ecuador, and after the end of the Hallstein Doctrine, official relations between the two countries were established in 1973. In April 1979, CDU politician Franz-Lorenz von Thadden was killed in an airplane accident in Ecuador, where he was inspecting development projects.

After German reunification, Ecuador moved into a new embassy building in 2001. In 2019, German President Frank-Walter Steinmeier visited Ecuador on a state visit to celebrate the 250th anniversary of Alexander von Humboldt's birth and met with President Lenín Moreno.

== Economic exchange ==
Germany is one of Ecuador's most important trading partners within the European Union. The total volume of trade with Ecuador amounted to 1.0 billion euros in 2021, putting Ecuador in 80th place in the ranking of German trading partners. German exports to Ecuador that year totaled 530 million euros, while imports from Ecuador totaled 495 million euros.

The German-Ecuadorian Chamber of Industry and Commerce has existed since 1977, and Ecuador signed a trade agreement with the European Union in 2017.

== Development cooperation ==
The Deutsche Gesellschaft für Internationale Zusammenarbeit and its predecessor companies has been active in Ecuador since 1962. After an interruption, bilateral development cooperation was resumed in September 2017. Development aid to Ecuador focuses on "environment and natural resources, biodiversity and forest conservation," "peace and social cohesion, good governance and migration," and "climate, sustainable urban development and mobility." For 2020/21, German aid stood at 121 million euros.

== Cultural relations ==
In Quito there is a Goethe Institute and in the city of Guayaquil there has been a German-Ecuadorian Cultural Center since 1956. In Ecuador there are three German schools in the cities of Quito, Guayaquil and Cuenca. Student exchanges and cooperation in higher education are coordinated through the German Academic Exchange Service.

== Military relations ==
German defense companies supplied Ecuador with various weapons, including Leopard 1 tanks (2009), pistols (2009), and speedboats (1999).

== Diplomatic locations ==
- Germany has an embassy in Quito.
- Ecuador has an embassy in Berlin and a consulate in Hamburg.
