= José Trajano Mera =

Ecuadorian poet and writer (1862-1919)

- Born: José Trajano Mera Iturralde; 1862; Ambato, Ecuador
- Died: 1919 (aged 56–57); Guayaquil, Ecuador
- Occupations: Poet, Playwright, Diplomat
- Relatives: Juan León Mera (father)

José Trajano Mera Iturralde (1862 in Ambato – 1919 in Guayaquil) was an Ecuadorian poet, playwright and diplomat from a literary family with a cultural lineage. His father was the writer Juan León Mera who wrote Ecuador's first novel Cumanda and the text of the Ecuadorian National Anthem.

He earned a degree in jurisprudence from the Central University of Ecuador. He died in Guayaquil in 1919 while holding the position of Undersecretary of the Ministry of Foreign Relations.

== Works ==
- Cónsules y Consulados (1910; Consuls and Consulates)
- Los virtuosos (1917; The Virtuous)
- La visita del poeta (The Poet's Visit)
- Paz en la guerra (1911; War in Peace)
- Sonetos y Sonetillos (1909; Sonnets and Little Sonnets)
- El reino de Bélgica: su comercio é industria (1909; The Belgium Kingdom: its commerce and industry)
