= Gastón Gagliardo =

Ecuadorian politician (born 1967)

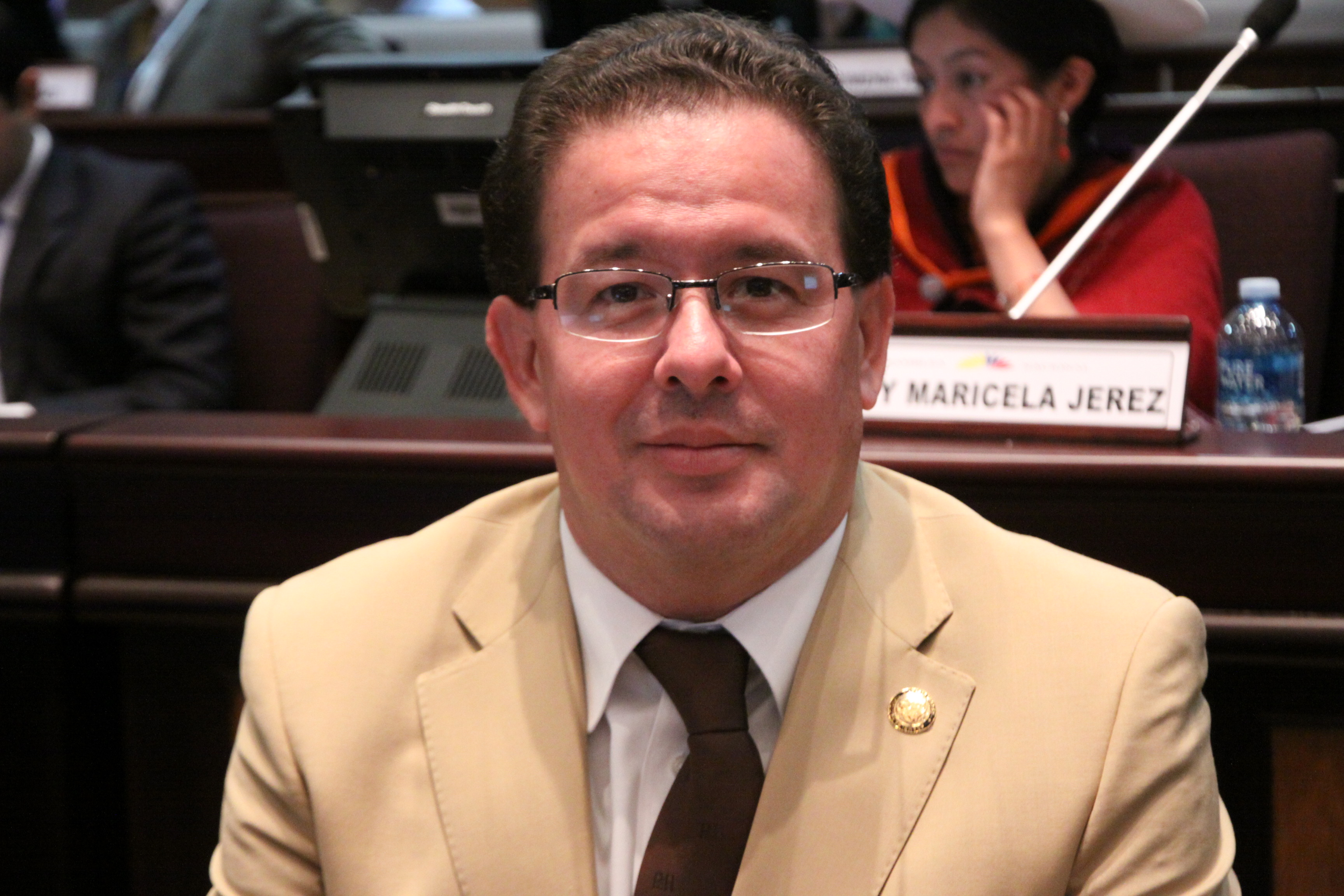
- Gagliardo in 2013

National Assemblyman for District 4 of Guayas Province
- In office July 31, 2009 – May 14, 2017

Personal details
- Born: Gastón Alberto Gagliardo Loor; April 28, 1967 (age 59) Guayaquil, Ecuador
- Party: Alianza PAIS

Gastón Alberto Gagliardo Loor is an Ecuadorian politician who served as a National Assemblyman for District 4 of Guayas between 2009 and 2017.

== Biography ==
Gagliardo was born in Guayaquil on April 28, 1967. He is married to Monica Arauz and is the father of three children. He graduated from Rocafuerte College in 1985 and earned a degree as a classical guitar concierto from the Antonio Neumane Conservatory.

He began his political career as a National Assemblyman for Guayas Province in 2009 as a member of Alianza PAIS. He was re-elected in 2013, serving until 2017. As a National Assemblyman, he served as a member Permanent Specialized Commission on Education, Culture, Science and Technology, the Parliamentary Group for Women's Rights, the Parliamentary Group for Natural Rights and Wellbeing, the Interparliamentary Friendship and Reciprocal Coordination Group between the Ecuadorian National Assembly and the Italian Senate.

Gagliardo sponsored a bill for the creation of Universidad de las Artes (Uniartes). He is a member of the Hemispheric Network of Parliamentarians and Former Parliamentarians for Early Childhood. He was an outspoken advocate to improve public policy towards early childhood education in Ecuador. After the Manabí Province earthquake, Gagliardo refused to donate 10% of his salary to the victims, saying "I am not Santa Claus."
