= Juan León Mera =

Ecuadorian writer, artist and politician (1832–1894)

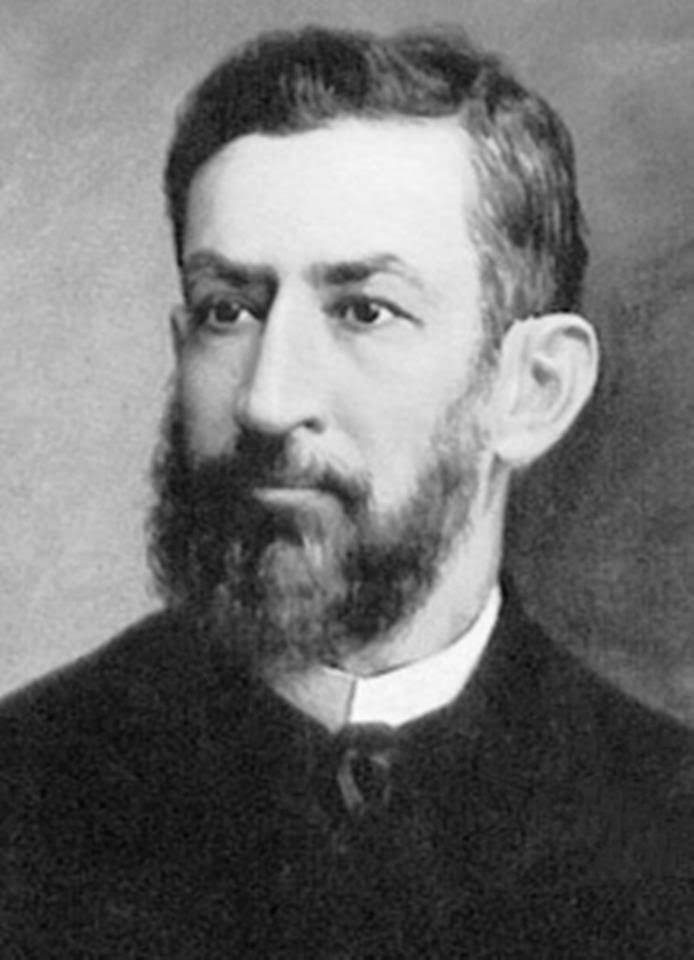
- Born: Juan León Mera Martínez; 28 June 1832; Ambato, Ecuador
- Died: 13 December 1894 (aged 62); Ambato, Ecuador
- Occupations: Essayist; novelist; politician; painter
- Writing career
- Language: Spanish
- Notable works: Cumandá (1879) a novel, "Salve, Oh Patria" (1865) the National Anthem of Ecuador

Juan León Mera Martínez (28 June 1832 – 13 December 1894) was an Ecuadorian essayist, novelist, politician and painter. His best-known works are the Ecuadorian National Hymn and the novel Cumandá (1879). Additionally, in his political career, he was a functionary of president Gabriel García Moreno.

== Biography ==
He was born in Ambato on 28 June 1832 and died in the same city on 13 December 1894. His father, Pedro Antonio Mera Gómez was a businessman while his mother Josefa Martínez Vásconez, raised her only son alone due to the fact that he abandoned her during her pregnancy. His infancy was humble while during his first years of life he lived at the “Los Molinos” country property, located in Ambato. In order to support the family his maternal grandmother rented the property to her brother Pablo Vásconez, who was a political activist who fought against the politics of Juan José Flores. León Mera received his education at home, which in large part was carried out by his great-uncle as well as his uncle Nicolás Martínez who was a doctor. At the age of twenty he traveled to Quito to study painting with the noted pictural artist Antonio Salas, where he learned how to paint oil and watercolor. At the age of 33, he and Antonio Neumane created the Ecuadorian National Hymn, "Salve, Oh patria". Juan Leon Mera's son José Trajano Mera (1862 – 1919) became a poet, playwright and diplomat.

=== Writing ===
In the year 1854, he published his first verses of poetry in the newspaper La Democracia, with the help of writer Miguel Riofrío. He founded the Ecuadorian Academy of language in 1874 and was a member of the Real Academia Española.

He is considered one of the precursors of Ecuadorian literature for his famous national novel Cumandá which shows the complicated racial and social intricacies of Ecuador following independence. It was published in Quito in the year 1879 and later in Madrid in 1891. This novel was later utilized by Ecuadorian dramaturgists of the 20th century Luis H. Salgado (1903–1977), Pedro Pablo Traversari Salazar (1874–1956) and Sixto María Durán Cárdenas (1875–1947) to each write an opera.

=== Political career ===
In addition to being a writer and painter he was a political conservative and follower of Gabriel García Moreno. He was the governor of Cotopaxi, Secretary of the Council of State, Senator, President of the Senate and National Congress in 1886. His former residence, the museum "La quinta de Juan León Mera", in the city of Ambato, exhibits his possessions.

== Works ==
Year of Publication	Literary work
1857	Fantasías
1857	Afectos íntimos
1858	Melodías indígenas
1858	Poesías
1861	La virgen del sol
1865	Himno Nacional del Ecuador
1868	Ojeada histórico-crítica sobre la poesía ecuatoriana
1872	Los novios de una aldea ecuatoriana
1875	Mazorra
1879	Cumandá o un drama entre salvajes
1883	Los últimos momentos de Bolívar
1884	La dictadura y la restauración de la República del Ecuador
1887	Lira ecuatoriana
1889	Entre dos tías y un tío
1890	Porqué soy cristiano
1892	Antología ecuatoriana: cantares del pueblo
1903	Tijeretazos y plumadas
1904	García Moreno
1909	Novelitas ecuatorianas

== Works based on his novels ==
Three operas have been based on Juan León Mera's novel Cumandá:

* Cumandá, by Luis H. Salgado
* Cumandá, by Sixto María Durán Cárdenas
* Cumandá o la virgen de las selvas byPedro Pablo Traversari Salazar
