= Miguel Riofrío =

Miguel Riofrio Sánchez (September 7, 1822 – October 11, 1879) was an Ecuadoran poet, novelist, journalist, orator, and educator. He was born in the city of Loja.

He is best known today as the author of Ecuador's first novel La Emancipada (1863). Owing to the book's length, usually less than 100 pages long, many experts have argued that it is really a novella rather than a full novel, and that Ecuador's first novel is Juan León Mera's Cumanda (1879). Nevertheless, thanks to the arguments of the well-known and respected Ecuadorian writer Alejandro Carrión (1915–1992), Miguel Riofrío's La Emancipada has been accepted as Ecuador's first novel.

Riofrio died in exile in Peru.
