= Anti-Colombian sentiment =

Discrimination against Colombians

Anti-Colombian sentiment (Spanish: anticolombianismo) is a xenophobic, discriminatory and/or prejudicial view of Colombia, Colombians and/or Colombian culture. Due to the diversity of ethnic backgrounds of Colombians, Anti-Colombian sentiment is usually based on nationality. However, ethnic groups such as Black and Indigenous Colombians may face additional issues abroad that White or Mestizo Colombians may not, and vice versa.

Anti-Colombian sentiment most often stems from negative stereotypes of Colombians originating in popular culture, generally related to illegal drug trade, prostitution and crime. High levels of emigration from the country, mainly because of economic and safety reasons, mostly relating to the Colombian armed conflict (especially since the early 2000s), have worsened the situation by allowing stereotypes to turn into xenophobic acts against Colombian migrants.

2003 Public opinion poll by Gallup, Inc. on Colombia
Pos.	Neg.	Neutral	Pos – Neg
26%	57%	17%	-31

== Causes ==
=== Depictions of Colombia abroad ===
Since the 1980s, movies and series portraying Colombia, or rather, Colombians in some sort of way have done so in a way they're involved in crime, mainly relating to international drug trade and, to a lesser degree, illegal immigration. This has diverted focus away from Colombia itself towards Colombians in foreign nations, namely the United States and countries in Europe. Oftentimes, Colombian media studios themselves portray Colombians in this light, with primary examples including The Mafia Dolls, Pablo Escobar, The Drug Lord or Sin tetas no hay paraíso.

US movies portraying Colombia, for example, often do so from a US-centrist perspective, trivializing Colombian society as "rural", "primitive", "backwards" or "inherently violent" and establishing a superiority complex in favor of the United States, sometimes not even filming the movie in Colombia or with Colombians, often mistaking aspects of Mexican culture as Colombia's.

=== Emigration from the country ===
Due to its economic and security situation, Colombia has historically been a country of emigrants. Emigration from Colombia can be separated into two phenomena: Economic emigration and international forced displacement.

The economy of Colombia is characterized by its big inequality problem, its lack of social mobility and its lack of medium-to-high income jobs within the country motivate educated middle class Colombians, who can afford moving abroad but do not have strong incentives to stay in Colombia, to depart from home seeking a better life in a foreign country, generally the United States, Spain, or Latin American countries with considerably higher income such as Chile or Uruguay. Security concerns may also motivate these people to move abroad, but, for this specific demographic, these concerns are mostly related to non-political violence rather than war.

On the other hand, forced displacement in Colombia since the start of Colombian armed conflict in the 1960s, although mostly taking place within the borders of the country, has forced anywhere between 360 thousand to 2.9 million people to become refugees abroad, mostly low-income individuals; though these numbers are highly unreliable due to the fact most refugees entered their host countries without undergoing formal asylum procedures. This process, although always existent, was intensified during the 2000s after the introduction of Plan Colombia (an umbrella term for US financing of the Colombian government during this period to combat drug cartels and left-wing guerillas), which caused an increase in violence by conflicts between guerrillas, paramilitary organizations and the National Army, as well as the ways the first two intimidate civilians; including forced recruitment and death threads.

== By country ==
=== Mexico ===
Border control authorities at Mexico City International Airport have been often accused of xenophobic discrimination (including arbitrary denial of access to the country) against Colombian tourists, particularly men, often giving no explanations whatsoever on why was the person denied access to the country. Allegations of torture on rejected Colombians, as well as other nationalities, inside immigration detention centers have been frequently made and reported on Colombian news media.

In response to the situation, on 24 October 2022, a diplomatic meeting between Colombia and Mexico regarding the treatment of rejected Colombians by Mexican authorities was held. The meeting concluded with a series of agreements including the right of Colombians to communicate with their families and country's consulate in Mexico about the situation, though the Colombian delegation said the meeting was "full of tensions" and "less fruitful than expected".

=== Panama ===
In February 2015, during a discussion regarding a migration reform bill in Panama presented by deputy Zulay Rodríguez, she accused Colombian immigrants of "bringing poverty and crime" to the country, adding that "whenever a Panamanian is arrested, five Colombians are next to him" and referring to jailed Colombians in Panama as "scum". Rodríguez's declarations received wide coverage in Colombian media, what led to her accusing then Colombian Minister of Foreign Affairs María Ángela Holguín (who had sent a letter to Rodríguez condemning the declarations) of decontextualization and double standards, calling Holguín out for "not condemning Maduro's declarations when he insulted her [Holguín]" and asking then Panamanian Minister of Foreign Affairs Isabel Saint Malo to "defend Panama's sovereignty", referring to Holguín's letter. Rodríguez at last apologized in April for her declarations, saying these were made "at the heat of the moment" and that "they did not deserved these expressions".

=== Spain ===
==== Instances of hate crimes ====
On 22 August 2021, a Colombian man in Spain denounced police officers at the Empalme station of Metrovalencia assaulted him. The Spanish police alleged the man was "being aggressive and thus, they had to detained him". The man said the police declarations were "totally false", alleging that, because "in Metrovalencia, there are security cameras 2 meters apart from one another in the stations, as well as in the busses", the police "had no proof [to sustain their accusations]". In an interview with W Radio Colombia, he claimed he almost lost his life in the incident, adding he had received several xenophobic comments from the officers.

In 2021, 51 hate crimes against Colombians in Spain were reported, or 2.72% of all hate crimes reported in the country, the largest number within immigrants from the Americas in Spain, surpassing even that of Venezuelans, who reported 33 hate crimes committed against them, or 1.76% of all reported hate crimes, within the same time period.

==== "Colombian COVID-19 strain" controversy ====
In mid 2021, during the COVID-19 pandemic, the Government of the Community of Madrid used the term "Colombian strain" to refer to the Mu variant of SARS-CoV-2 (the virus that causes COVID-19), in allusion to the fact this variant was first reported in Colombia. The usage of the term was criticized by then Colombian Minister of Health Fernando Ruiz Gómez, who labeled it as "imprecise" and "xenophobic", also pointing out that "a variant being first reported in one country does not mean it is from there".

=== United States ===
Colombian singer Luis Ángel Rengifo and his wife María Martínez, who left Colombia for the United States after allegedly receiving death threats from the paramilitary group Los Rastrojos Costeños, made allegations against US police officials in April 2023 saying that, after she was beat up in a street near Times Square with an iron chair and a table by another man, Rengifo and his friends nearby called both the police and an ambulance. He claimed that, after they arrived, the police had only listen to the other man's version of the story, since the other man had recorded a video showing Rengifo pushing the man away from Martínez, and that, on top of that, the ambulance refused to take her in while admitting the man. Rengifo alleged he was imprisoned for 17 hours, after which Rengifo was charged with felony charges. He added that, during both the times they were arrested and imprisoned, Martínez was sexually harassed by police officers.

He alleged the reason behind why the police treated him and Martínez the way he said they did was because of Hispanophobia by the officers, alleging the man he accused of beating her was Russian and that the couple had known him for a year. Martínez alleged the reason the man beat her up was because she threw a series of aerosol paintings owned by the man to the floor after he had destroyed the couple's 360-degree camera and she repeatedly told him "pay me [another] camera", all after the man left 4 to 5 months before the incident and came back with an aggressive attitude she described as "discriminatory". Rengifo has said that since the incident occurred, Martínez has committed self harm and has been suffering a serious decline in her mental health. He also alleged one time police seized a speaker of his from him while the same man was carrying another speaker himself and his was not seized. As of 5 May 2023, a trial is pending for 6 June, where Rengifo's lawyers will be able to show proofs to contradict the police's version.

=== Venezuela ===
Venezuela is the country with the most Colombian immigrants in the world. At the end of the 70s and beginning of the 80s, the situation in Colombia caused millions of Colombians (usually from the lower class) to move to Venezuela. Due to this, xenophobia and mistreatment towards Colombian immigrants residing in Venezuela increased considerably.

In 1995, during a diplomatic crisis caused by a sovereignty violation committed by the Venezuelan Armed Forces against Colombia during an operative to capture poppy growers who, they claimed, were harming the Serranía del Perijá, Venezuelan media made several comments against the Colombian government while praising the actions of the Venezuelan Army at the same time. The comments fueled Anti-Colombian sentiment in Venezuela, which had beforehand been already a widespread problem in the country.

Since Nicolás Maduro assumed the presidency of Venezuela in 2013, different media and opponents of the regime have pointed out his Colombian origins, and the possible illegality of his presidency because of this. As a result, among most Venezuelan opponents there has been a general rejection of the president's supposed Colombian nationality. Even today it is not known exactly where Maduro was born.

In cities like Caracas, the population of disadvantaged neighborhoods is made up of a large percentage of people of Colombian origin, especially Petare. The economic situation of these people and their Colombian origins sometimes provoke rejection among residents of other areas of the city.
