= Hispanophobia =

Discrimination against Spanish or Latin Americans

Hispanophobia is the fear, aversion, or hostility directed toward Hispanic or Latin American populations and cultures. In scholarly usage, it is understood not merely as individual prejudice, but as a phenomenon embedded within historical and structural systems of racial and colonial power, which produce and sustain the “othering” of Hispanic peoples.

The term is used in academic and social discourse to describe systemic or cultural bias against Hispanic or Latino populations. It appears in different contexts, such as anti-Spanish sentiment in early modern Europe, anti-Mexican sentiment in the United States following the Mexican–American War. This bias intersected with broader social and political dynamics, including ethnic stereotypes, nationalist agendas, and immigrant invasion rhetoric and territorial incorporation, reflecting how systemic and cultural prejudices were reproduced through literature, tourism, and political discourse.

== Hispanophobia-related acts ==
=== English-only movement ===
While framed as promoting linguistic unity and administrative efficiency, Official English policies disproportionately target Spanish and Latino communities, and are closely intertwined with broader concerns about immigration, national identity, and assimilation.
