= List of incidents of xenophobia during the Venezuelan refugee crisis =

Acts and displays of prejudice, xenophobia, discrimination, violence, and racism against Venezuelan migrants have intensified in the 2010s due to the Venezuelan refugee crisis.

== Background ==
=== Independence period ===
Flag of Ecuador between 1845 and 1861 (Época Marcista), used in place of the Bolivarian tricolor that was then associated with the dictatorship of Venezuelan general Juan José Flores.

After the Spanish American wars of independence, Venezuelans came to hold key positions in the administration of the nascent republics. This unleashed the resentment of the local populations, who held revolts to expel the foreigners. In September 1828 in Bogotá, the Septembrina Conspiracy was carried out; this was an attempt to assassinate the leader Simón Bolívar, who was supported by the Venezuelan military and in opposition to the generals and Nueva-Granadian lawyers led by Francisco de Paula Santander. These events would lead to the dissolution of the Bolivarian projects of Gran Colombia and New Granada (today Colombia and Panama) three years later, with Ecuador and Venezuela achieving total independence.

For his part, Bolívar also imposed an authoritarian regime in Peru, where Venezuelan troops committed various abuses. The unpopular Bolivarian Constitution was repealed in 1827 and Peru went to war with Gran Colombia the following year, shortly after intervening in Bolivia in support of the rebels who wished to overthrow the regime of the Venezuelan Antonio José de Sucre.

In Ecuador, the Venezuelan Juan José Flores continued to rule as a dictator until 1845, the year in which the Marcista Revolution or Nationalist Revolution occurred, an uprising that had among its objectives the expulsion foreign troops that still remained in the country.

=== Petroleum boom ===
The emergence of the oil boom in the 1970s led to unparalleled economic growth in Venezuela. This caused Venezuelans to be stereotyped as opulent, arrogant or "agringados", partly due to the xenophobia they committed against the population of border regions and against the increased numbers of migrants who moved to the country.

=== Chavismo and crisis ===
When Hugo Chávez came to power relations with several countries deteriorated, to the point that the Colombian government denounced the existence of a project of Venezuelan imperialism over the region. According to various sources, the Venezuelan government was interfering in the governments of Argentina, Bolivia, and several Caribbean islands, as well as outwardly supporting the Revolutionary Armed Forces of Colombia.

The ideological rejection of Chavismo and Madurismo gained a growing xenophobia following the daily departure of thousands of Venezuelans due to the economic crisis that the country has been going through since 2013. According to the UN, by the beginning of 2019 the number of refugees from Venezuela in other countries reached about 3.5 million. Despite the fact that regional governments have welcomed migrants in solidarity, Venezuelans have been accused of influencing higher unemployment and crime rates, and have become victims of harassment, insults and even violence by citizens of different countries.

== By country ==
=== Bolivia ===
In March 2019, a group of 14 Venezuelans were arrested by immigration authorities for protesting in front of Cuba's embassy in La Paz. Six of them were expelled from the country, since according to the government:

Once the immigration interviews were completed, it was identified that these citizens do not have legal trade or legal reason for their stay in the country. They confessed to being involved in conspiratorial activities, and participating in political activities that affect public order, in exchange for money.

However, the action was condemned by organizations such as Amnesty International, which felt that the expulsion was arbitrary and done as part of systematic persecution against Venezuelan migrants due to the close relationship of the government of Evo Morales with the regime of Nicolás Maduro.

=== Brazil ===
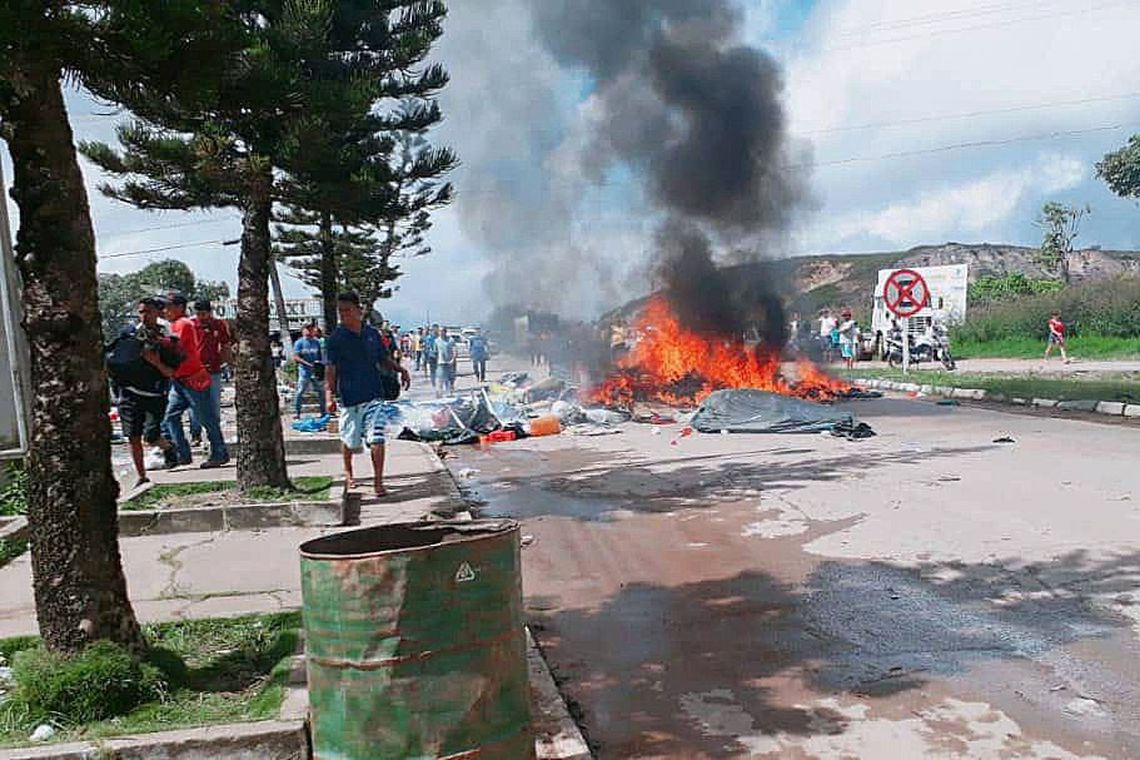
An attack on a Venezuelan migrant population in Pacaraima, Brazil, in August 2018.

In August 2018, the government of the border state of Roraima requested a temporary closure of the border, claiming that its administration was unable to control the large number of Venezuelans who entered the country daily. Initially, Judge Helder Girão Barreto ordered the suspension of land entry of Venezuelans, but later the measure was revoked by the Supreme Court, which considered that the prohibition was contrary to the Constitution and international pacts signed by Brazil.

Days later, a Venezuelan refugee camp was attacked in the municipality of Pacaraima. A mob armed with provincial weapons set fire to tents and other belongings of the immigrants, forcing more than 1,200 back over the border. The events occurred in retaliation for the alleged attack on a Brazilian merchant by four Venezuelans.

Then-presidential candidate Jair Bolsonaro said the government should not turn its back on popular sentiment in Roraima, and proposed the creation of refugee camps with the help of the UN. Once he became president, Bolsonaro said he would adopt more rigorous criteria for the entry of foreigners to Brazil, but ruled that he would not return Venezuelan immigrants to their country.

=== Chile ===
In May 2017, Venezuelan protesters were confronted by a group of Chileans who showed their support for the government of Nicolás Maduro in the vicinity of the Venezuelan embassy in Santiago. Some months later, Venezuelans protesting in the same place were beaten and robbed by Chilean communists.

In January 2018, a disabled woman attacked an immigrant woman in Santiago with a cane, while calling her a communist and saying she voted for Sebastián Piñera. The same month, a driver from Valparaíso shouted "Venezuelan piece of shit" at an immigrant who was working in a gas station, before attacking him with a broom.

In January 2019, during a match between the U-20 teams of Chile and Venezuela, Chilean soccer player Nicolás Díaz Huincales called the Venezuelan player Pablo Bonilla "starving to death". Subsequently, the Chilean player offered public apologies through a letter. A Chilean woman also referred to an immigrant she worked with "starving to death" in Cartagena later in the month.

In February of the same year, following the publication of a video where a group of Chileans and Venezuelans offended the victims of Augusto Pinochet, left-wing citizens launched a virtual campaign calling on people not to help immigrants and asking for expulsion of the venecos and venezorranas, both offensive slurs against Venezuelans specifically.

According to statements by the Dominican consul in Arica, the Chilean border police deny entry to any immigrant who is black or Venezuelan and does not carry prepaid documents and tickets detailing where they will stay and when they will return.

On September 25, 2021, residents of Iquique organised a protest against recent immigrants, most of whom are Venezuelans. During the protests an incident occurred in which a group of protesters set the belongings of migrants afire. Chilean Public Ministry ordered an investigation to identify and prosecute those responsible for the arson.

=== Colombia ===
In January 2017, while delivering houses built by the Ministry of Housing to displaced people in the border town of Tibú, then-Vice President Germán Vargas Lleras said:

They are for displaced population, but those in Tibú, they are not going to let the "venecos" get there, for all in the world, they are not for the "venecos".

Although Vargas Lleras later said that his use of "veneco" was only as a demonym, the Venezuelan president Nicolás Maduro said it was a xenophobic aggression and demanded an apology.

In May 2017, Rodolfo Hernández, mayor of Bucaramanga, said that from Venezuela it was the beggars, prostitutes and unemployed who had arrived, and that it was not possible to throw them out, but the city was unable to respond to the crisis.

In September 2017, there was a confrontation between Colombian and Venezuelan street vendors for the control of the spaces within the TransMilenio system, which left one person dead.

Since the end of 2017, threatening pamphlets against Venezuelans began circulating in the border cities of Cúcuta and Arauca. Among the groups involved in delivering these threats were the ELN, the Clan del Golfo, and the Arauca Social Cleansing Group.

In January 2018, a group of young people launched incendiary bombs at 900 Venezuelans who were in a refuge in a sports center in Cúcuta.

In May 2018, an audio clip began circulating in which military threats were made against immigrants who did not leave the municipality of Subachoque within two weeks.

In October 2018, a Venezuelan was lynched in Ciudad Bolívar, after being connected to the kidnapping of children through fake WhatsApp chains. At least 200 citizens participated in the lynching using stones, sticks and machetes. After this, two Venezuelans were about to be lynched in the same place and two other migrants were beaten in Transmilenio.

In January 2019, threatening pamphlets appeared against Venezuelans residing in Ipiales, near the border with Ecuador. The authorities consider that the phenomenon occurred due to the return of a Venezuelan population from Ecuador, where there were attacks against immigrants in the previous weeks.

In February 2019, mayor Rodolfo Hernández said Venezuelans were "factories for making poor chinitos". Five months later, journalist Claudia Palacios wrote a column in the newspaper El Tiempo urging Venezuelans to stop giving birth.

In July 2019, five quartered bodies were found in Bogotá, three of them belonging to Venezuelan citizens. In August of the same year, threatening pamphlets appeared in Bucaramanga, demanding that the city's merchants replace their Venezuelan workers within 48 hours.

With the increase in the number of Venezuelan immigrants seeking housing in Bogotá, there are reports that in several places it is common to find advertisements saying "For rent: no Venezuelans."

During the campaign for the 2018 presidential elections, a common accusation among the candidates was that their competition wanted to make Colombia a second Venezuela. In addition, the conservative candidate Alejandro Ordóñez said that in the face of massive migration of Venezuelans, businessmen should prioritize the right to work of Colombians. Ordóñez was subsequently appointed Colombian ambassador to the Organization of American States, a position from which he said that Venezuelan migration was part of an agenda to radiate socialism throughout Latin America.

According to a survey published by Semana magazine in March 2019, 41% of migrants had suffered some type of rejection or discrimination. However, 81% of respondents said they had not been the victim of any crime because of their nationality, and most of them described Colombians as kind and friendly people.

Prior to the 2022 Colombian election, a study by the pollster Ivamer found that 63.2% of Colombians had a negative opinion on Venezuelans, and 60.2% disagreed with President Iván Duque's policy towards Venezuelans.

=== Curaçao ===
In 2017, 1,203 Venezuelans were deported from Curaçao. Many of them were even forced to pay their return ticket.

Through a fierce removal strategy, Venezuelans without stability are deported before they can apply for refugee status. Despite the claims of organizations such as Amnesty International. In November 2018, the Ministry of the Interior and Kingdom Relations of the Netherlands (the country to which the island belongs) stated that the government would not investigate the matter.

=== Ecuador ===
In August 2018, the Ecuadorian government issued a decree requiring Venezuelans who would like to enter the country to present valid passports. However, a judge suspended the application of the decree, arguing that it contradicted the international agreements signed by Ecuador.

In October of the same year, a march by Venezuelans in Quito was confronted by a group of citizens who threatened to burn immigrants alive, while calling on the government for greater immigration controls. One of the group participants stated:

We are tired that Venezuelans in addition to their conceit, their arrogance, that they come to steal, to kill, all against us. I don't know what they demand, nor do I know who would organize that march, but we want to avoid confrontation.

In January 2019, after the brutal murder of an Ecuadorian woman at the hands of a Venezuelan in Ibarra, there were a series of attacks against migrants, including forced evictions and burning of property. A few hours after the murder, President Lenin Moreno had declared:

Ecuador is and will be a country of peace. I will not let any antisocial people take it away from us. The integrity of our mothers, daughters and friends is my priority.

I have arranged for the immediate formation of brigades to monitor the legal situation of Venezuelan immigrants in the streets, in the workplace and on the border.

We have opened the doors, but we will not sacrifice anyone's safety.

Moreno received harsh criticism for these statements, as some groups felt that his words prompted xenophobia. Venezuelan president Nicolás Maduro called Moreno a "nazi", "fascist" and a traitor.

Days later, Ecuador began to demand that Venezuelans entering the country show their criminal records, while some 250 migrants returned to Venezuela as part of a humanitarian corridor created by the Venezuelan government itself because of increased anti-Venezuelan sentiment after the event.

=== Hungary ===
Despite its anti-immigration rhetoric following the European migrant crisis, the government of Viktor Orbán has welcomed hundreds of Venezuelan migrants who have proven to have at least one Hungarian ancestor. However, the reception has not been as positive, with several citizens complaining to the police about the presence of black Venezuelans in the surroundings of the spa of Balatonoszod, where immigrants were initially housed.

=== Iran ===
During the 2017 presidential elections, the reformist press used the word venezueloi ("Venezuelanization"), to criticize the government for taking a course similar to that of the Nicolás Maduro regime and to warn of the possibility of an economic crisis similar to that of Venezuela.

=== Panama ===
In November 2016, the National Front of the Panamanian People called a protest under the slogan "no more arepas, no more tequeños" (in reference to two typical dishes of Venezuela). The organizers of the march argued that Venezuelan migrants harmed the country's economy, displacing local workers and increasing crime. The march generated alarm among some groups, but in the end it only gathered a few dozen people.

In August 2017, president Juan Carlos Varela announced that a visa would be required for Venezuelans traveling to Panama, citing economic and security reasons:

In the face of the rupture of the democratic order in Venezuela, a situation that puts our security, our economy and the sources of employment of Panamanians at risk, and after thorough consideration, I have made the decision to demand a visa from Venezuelan citizens who want to travel to Panama

The Venezuelan government considered the measure anti-integrationist and said they would act with reciprocity. Shortly thereafter, advertisements appeared in which Panamanian bars offered discounts to those who beat Venezuelan immigrants.

=== Peru ===
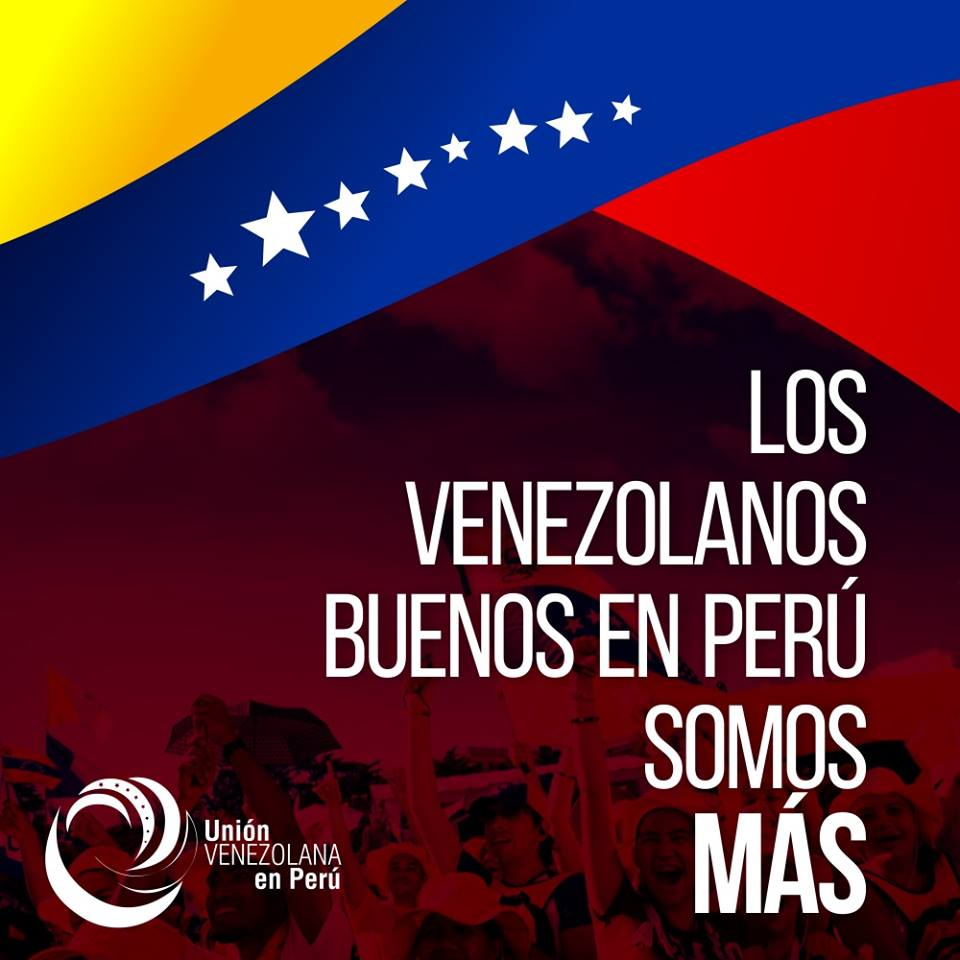
Campaign slogan saying "We the good Venezuelans in Peru are more"

It is reported that many Venezuelan criminals have arrived in Peru and continued to commit crimes, which causes the increase in xenophobia. In March 2018, an anti-Venezuelan campaign was spread on social networks, during which banners with the slogan "Peru without Venezuelans" were seen on several bridges in Lima.

In June 2018, a person was injured after clashes between Peruvians and Venezuelans in the Lima district of San Martín de Porres. In July 2018, marches were called to reject the presence of Venezuelan immigrants in Peru.

In August 2018, the Peruvian government introduced a passport requirement from those Venezuelans who intended to enter the country, but the measure was suspended in October, when the courts ruled that this requirement was against with the commitments Peru must follow as part of Mercosur. In the same month, 89 Venezuelans returned to their country sponsored by their own government. Nicolás Maduro said that his countrymen had been victims of a hate campaign, and that in Peru they had only found racism, contempt, economic persecution and slavery.

In January 2019, a Venezuelan was killed after fights between Venezuelans and Peruvians in the district of Chao (La Libertad). In the same month there were clashes between Venezuelans protesting in front of their country's embassy in Lima and Peruvian citizens who demanded that their government close the borders.

According to the International Organization for Migration, 35% of Venezuelans living in Peru have suffered acts of xenophobia.

In September 2019, news was given of the discovery of two mutilated bodies whose remains had been distributed in different parts of Lima. After some investigations, the police reported that the bodies belonged to a citizen of Venezuelan origin and a Peruvian, apparently killed due to deals with a foreign criminal organization. In videos obtained from the security cameras of a hotel in San Martín de Porres, where both victims were killed, it was discovered that those involved in the crime were five Venezuelan nationals, three men and two women, one of whom already had a criminal record for homicide, who are seen moving the remains to a vehicle. This news spurred a wave of hatred and panic towards Venezuelan immigrants in social networks. The border security was also criticized, with the government of Martín Vizcarra facing condemnation for allowing the entry of the criminals.

=== Trinidad and Tobago ===
In April 2018, 82 Venezuelan asylum seekers were deported from Trinidad and Tobago, which violated international laws on the matter. Given the criticism issued by UNHCR, Prime Minister Keith Rowley said he would not allow the UN or any other agency to "turn his country into a refugee camp". Venezuelan migrants in Trinidad and Tobago are victims of widespread discrimination, since unlike other countries, no refugee reception plan has been implemented on the islands so it is hard to find legal work without being sent back.

== Internet ==
With the hyperinflation in Venezuela and the devalued Venezuelan bolívar, many Venezuelans have turned to virtual gold farming in massively multiplayer online role-playing games (MMORPG) like Tibia and RuneScape. In Reddit, a user published a racially abusive guide on how to kill Venezuelans in the “player-v-player” places where the gold farming takes place; the guide was followed by intemperate comments. The moderators removed the post and the comments afterwards.

== See also ==
- Anti-Chilean sentiment
- Anti-Mexican sentiment
- Venezuelan refugee crisis
