= Cumandá (novel) =

Ecuadorian novel by Juan León Mera

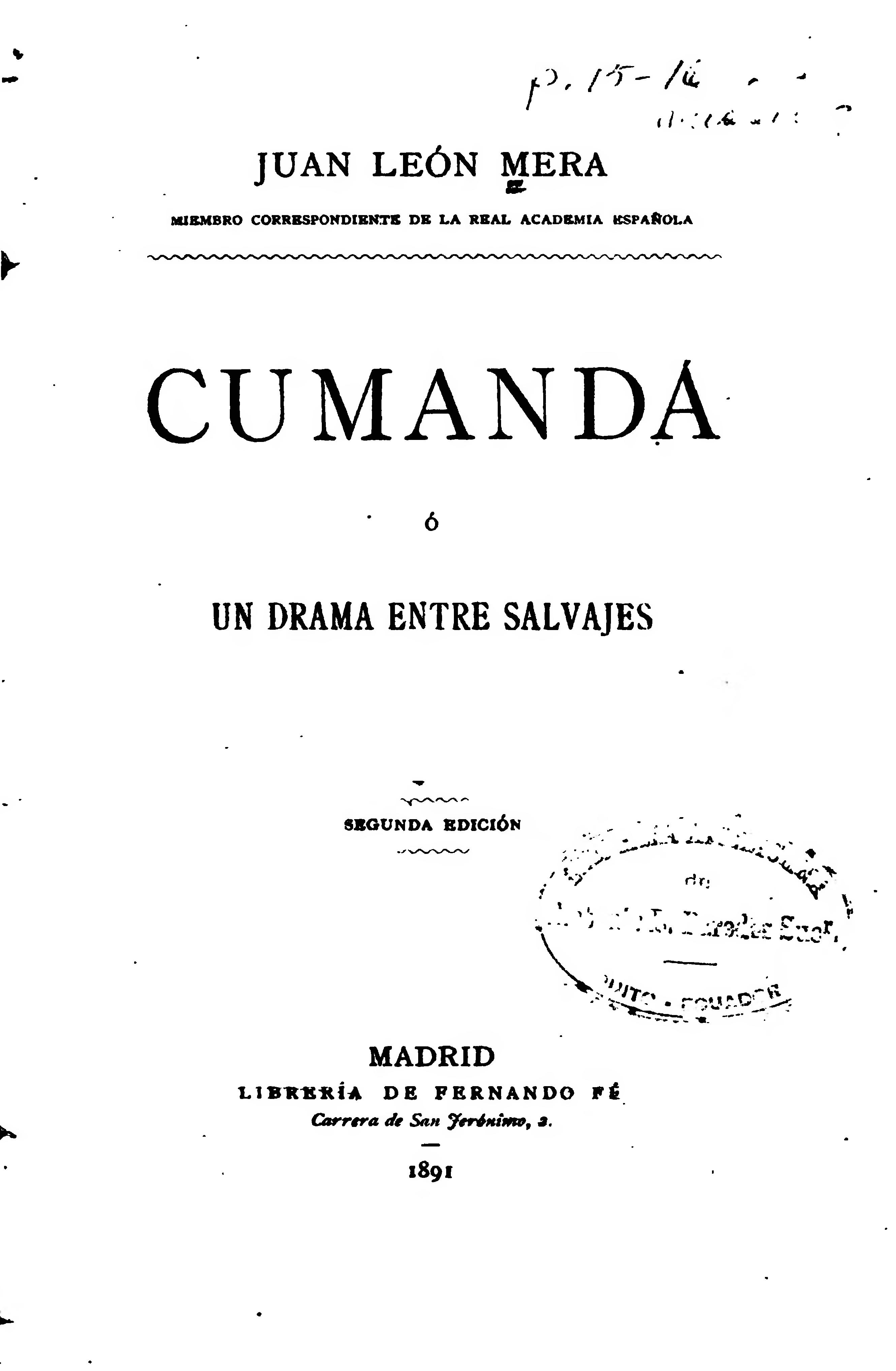
Cumandá

Cumandá o Un drama entre salvajes (English: Cumanda or A Drama Between Savages) is a classic Ecuadorian novel by Juan León Mera. The novel was written in 1877.

Juan León Mera sent the novel from Ambato, Ecuador to the Director of the Royal Spanish Academy on March 10, 1877. He wanted the novel to be presented to the Academy as a show of gratitude for recently being appointed a member. In the letter he pointed out that although writers such as François-René de Chateaubriand and James Fenimore Cooper had already written novels about savages in America, his was very different because it took place in the jungles of the Amazon whose natives had very different customs from those of North America, and of whom very little had been written about thus far.

== English translation ==
Cumanda was translated in 2007 by Noé O. Vaca as Cumanda: The Novel of the Ecuadorian Jungle.
