= Salve, Oh Patria =

National anthem of Ecuador

¡Salve, Oh Patria!
English: Hail, Oh Fatherland!
- National anthem of Ecuador
- Lyrics: Juan León Mera, 1865
- Music: Antonio Neumane, 1870
- Adopted: 1948; 78 years ago

Audio sample
- U.S. Navy Band instrumental version: file; help

"¡Salve, Oh Patria!" (English: "Hail, Oh Fatherland!") is the national anthem of Ecuador. The lyrics were written in 1865 by poet Juan León Mera, under request of the Ecuadorian Senate; the music was composed by Antonio Neumane. However, it was not officially adopted by the Congress until September 29, 1948.

The anthem consists of a chorus and six verses, of which only the second verse and the chorus (before and after the verse) are actually sung. The verses are marked by a strong anti-Spanish sentiment and narrate the failed 1809 uprising against Bonapartist Spain and the 1820–1822 Ecuadorian War of Independence.

== History ==
From 1830 to 1832, José Joaquín de Olmedo wrote a national anthem (chorus and four verses) as an homage to the nascent Ecuadorian state. This composition, suggested by General Juan José Flores, was not set to music and did not gain popularity. In 1833, a hymn titled "Canción Ecuatoriana" (English: "Ecuadorian Song"), of six verses, was published in the Gaceta del Gobierno del Ecuador No. 125 of December 28. A composition date of 1830 was given, but most historians do not consider this definitive, because it was by an anonymous author. In 1838, a Canción Nacional (National Song), of a chorus and six verses, appeared included in the pamphlet Poesías by General Flores, which was published by the Government Press. In a later editions, there were changes to the third verse. Even so, for historians, it is the second Canción Nacional that is known.

In 1865, the Argentine musician Juan José Allende, in collaboration with the Ecuadorian Army, presented to the National Congress a musical project for the lyrics by José Joaquín de Olmedo, but it was not well received. In November of this year, at the express request of the president of the Senate, Nicolás Espinosa, the Ambateño poet Juan León Mera Martínez, who was then the secretary of the Senate, wrote and submitted the lyrics of the National Anthem. These lyrics were then sent, with Congressional approval, to Guayaquil, so that Antonio Neumane would set them to music. This is the hymn that would later be officialized as the definitive national anthem.

On January 16, 1866, the complete version of the lyrics by Juan León Mera were published in the Quiteño weekly El Sud Americano. In 1870, the national anthem premiered in the Plaza Grande (Plaza de la Independencia facing the Palacio de Gobierno), performed by the 2nd Battalion and the Compañía Lírica de Pablo Ferreti, directed by Antonio Neumane. The music was in the key of B flat major. The current introduction of 16 measures was composed by Domenico Brescia and Enrique Marconi in 1901. Today, the hymn is performed in the key of E major from 2001 onward.

In 1913, the Guayaquileño writer and diplomat Víctor Manuel Rendón submitted a new hymn with lyrics adapted from the music of Antonio Neumane, but ultimately the Legislature rejected the proposal.

On September 29, 1948, the National Congress declared Juan León Mera's verses an official anthem.

A new official version was adopted on March 21, 2001, arranged by Álvaro Manzano.

== Lyrics ==
U.S. Navy Band instrumental version (abridged)
Abridged, sub-90-second rendition featuring only the intro and chorus. This arrangement is commonly played at public events like football games where a full performance would be impracticable.

As a full performance can last up to three minutes, in many instances only a sub-90 second rendition of the chorus is performed at public events like soccer games.

=== Official lyrics ===
Spanish original

Coro:
¡Salve, Oh Patria, mil veces, oh Patria!
¡Gloria a ti, gloria a ti!
Ya tu pecho, tu pecho, rebosa,
gozo y paz ya tu pecho rebosa;
𝄆 Y tu frente, tu frente radiosa,
Más que el sol contemplamos lucir. 𝄇

II:
Los primeros, los hijos del suelo
que, soberbio, el Pichincha decora,
te aclamaron por siempre señora
y vertieron su sangre por ti.
Dios miró y aceptó el holocausto
y esa sangre fue germen fecundo
de otros héroes que atónito el mundo
vió en tu torno a millares surgir.
𝄆 ¡A millares surgir! 𝄇

Coro

English translation

Chorus:
Hail, Oh Fatherland, a thousand times! Oh Fatherland,
Glory be to you! Glory be to you!
Now your breast, your breast, overflows,
Now your breast overflows with joy and peace;
𝄆 And your forehead, your radiant forehead
we contemplate shining more than the Sun. 𝄇

II:
The firsts, the sons of the soil
Which Pichincha superbly adorns,
Declared you as their sovereign lady forever,
And shed their blood for you.
God observed and accepted the holocaust,
And that blood was the fertile germ
Of other heroes whom the world in astonishment
Saw rise up around you by the thousands.
𝄆 Rise up by the thousands! 𝄇

Chorus

=== Full lyrics ===
Spanish original

Coro:
¡Salve, Oh Patria, mil veces, oh Patria!
¡Gloria a ti, gloria a ti!
Ya tu pecho, tu pecho, rebosa,
gozo y paz ya tu pecho rebosa;
𝄆 Y tu frente, tu frente radiosa,
Más que el sol contemplamos lucir. 𝄇
I
Indignados tus hijos del yugo
que te impuso la ibérica audacia,
de la injusta y horrenda desgracia
que pesaba fatal sobre ti,
santa voz a los cielos alzaron,
voz de noble y sin par juramento,
de vengarte del monstruo sangriento,
de romper ese yugo servil.

Coro

II (verso oficial)
Los primeros, los hijos del suelo
que, soberbio, el Pichincha decora,
te aclamaron por siempre señora
y vertieron su sangre por tí.
Dios miró y aceptó el holocausto
y esa sangre fue germen fecundo
de otros héroes que atónito el mundo
vió en tu torno a millares surgir.

Coro

III
De estos héroes al brazo del hierro
nada tuvo invencible la tierra,
y del valle a la altísima sierra
se escuchaba el fragor de la lid.
Tras la lid, la victoria volaba,
libertad tras el triunfo venía,
y al león destrozado se oía
de impotencia y despecho rugir.

Coro

IV
Cedió al fin la fiereza española,
y hoy, oh Patria, tu libre existencia
es la noble y magnífica herencia
que nos dio el heroísmo feliz.
De las manos paternas la hubimos,
nadie intente arrancárnosla ahora,
ni nuestra ira excitar vengadora
quiera, necio o audaz, contra sí.

Coro

V
Nadie, oh Patria, lo intente. Las sombras
de tus héroes gloriosos nos miran,
y el valor y el orgullo que inspiran
son augurios de triunfos por ti.
Venga el hierro y el plomo fulmíneo,
que a la idea de guerra y venganza
se despierta la heroica pujanza
que hizo al fiero español sucumbir.

Coro

VI
Y si nuevas cadenas prepara
la injusticia de bárbara suerte,
¡gran Pichincha! prevén tú la muerte
de la Patria y sus hijos al fin
Hunde al punto en tus hondas entrañas
cuanto existe en tu tierra, el tirano
huelle solo cenizas y en vano
busque rastro de ser junto a ti.

Coro

English translation

Chorus:
We greet you, Oh Fatherland, a thousand times!
Oh Fatherland, glory to you, glory to you!
Your breast, your breast, overflows
Your breast overlows with joy and peace,
𝄆 and your radiant, your radiant face
is brighter than the shining sun we see.𝄇

I
Your children were outraged by the yoke
That Iberian audacity imposed on you,
By the unjust and horrendous disgrace
Fatally weighing upon you.
They cried out a holy voice to the heavens,
that noble voice of a unbreakable pledge,
to defeat that monster of blood,
that this servile yoke would disappear.

Chorus

II (official verse)
The first sons of the soil
Which Pichincha proudly adorns,
Declared you as their sovereign lady forever,
And shed their blood for you.
God observed and accepted the holocaust,
And that blood was the prolific seed
Of other heroes whom the world in astonishment
Saw rise up around you by the thousands.

Chorus

III
Of those heroes of iron arm
No land was invincible,
And from the valley to the highest sierra
You could hear the roar of the fray.
After the fray, Victory would fly,
Freedom after the triumph would come,
And the Lion was heard broken
With a roar of helplessness and despair.

Chorus

IV
At last Spanish ferocity yielded,
And now, oh Fatherland, your free existence
Is the noble and magnificent heritage
Which the felicitous heroism gave us.:
It was given to us from our Fathers' hands,
Let no one take it from us now,
Nor any daring fool wish to excite
Our vengeful anger against himself.

Chorus

V
May no one, oh Fatherland, try it. The shadows of
Your glorious heroes watch us,
And the valor and pride that they inspire
Are omens of victories for you.
Come lead and the striking iron,
That the idea of war and revenge
Wakes the heroic strength
That made the fierce Spanish succumb.

Chorus

VI
And if new chains are prepared by
The barbaric injustice of fate,
Great Pichincha! May you prevent the death
Of the Fatherland and her children in the end;
Sink to the deep point in your gut
All that exists on your soil. Let the tyrant
Tread only ashes and in vain
Look for any trace of being beside you.

Chorus
