= Sixto María Durán Cárdenas =

Ecuadorian pianist and composer (1875–1947)

Sixto María Durán Cárdenas (August 6, 1875 – January 13, 1947) was an Ecuadorian pianist, composer, and lawyer.

He served as a judge, composed more than one hundred musical works, and was director of the National Conservatory of Music on three occasions. He also composed hymns for various institutions and military marches.

== Personal life and death ==
Durán Cárdenas was born in Quito on August 6, 1875, the same day when the President Gabriel García Moreno was murdered.

His parents were Domingo Durán, aide-de-camp of President Gabriel García Moreno, and Emperatriz Cárdenas, his first music teacher, a singer and notable harpist.

After completing his elementary education and having lost his father, he entered the San Luis Minor Seminary in Quito. Julio Troncoso, director of the publication El año ecuatoriano, indicates that at the Seminary, Durán had a great music teacher in the priest Ditte, a Dutch Lazarist; however, another brief biography, unpublished and without a signature of responsibility, indicates that it was with the German priest Jausen, with whom he carried out his musical studies. At this time, the young artist had to teach mathematics privately to finance his studies.

He earned a law degree from the Central University of Ecuador in 1889. He stood out in his multifaceted intellectual life, becoming President of the Supreme Court of Justice in 1909, among other representative public positions. While he was a renowned, award-winning music composer, he continued to practice law throughout his lifetime because in Ecuador musical careers were not well-paid.

Due to the difficult circumstances of academic music in Ecuador, the composer was forced to prepare himself largely as an autodidact, since only two years after his birth, the main music institute, the National Conservatory, founded by García Moreno in 1870, had been closed.

In 1900 President Eloy Alfaro appointed him Intermediate Piano Professor of the newly reopened National Conservatory of Music. In 1911 President Emilio Estrada Carmona appointed him the director of the National Conservatory of Music. He took on this position again in 1923 (for 10 years) and again from 1941-1943. During his years as Director of the Conservatory, he organized and conducted the student and faculty symphony orchestra, as well as trained a large number of composers and performers.

In 1916 he was the director of the School of Arts and Crafts. In 1918 he suffered a serious accident on one of the machines at the School of Arts and Crafts and lost the fingers of his right hand. The writer Zoila Ugarte de Landívar wrote: The happy bohemian, the musician of the yaravís, had the misfortune of losing the fingers of his right hand. No, it was not his fingers that were mercilessly destroyed by the artisan's voracious machine; it mutilated the artist's dreamy soul... Then a Committee was formed to send him to Europe in search of relief and consolation for the infinite sadness of his spirit, because he was sad although he hid it because he always smiled and in the Senate Chamber a project of agreement was approved with that objective, which however was never fulfilled. He could not continue his career as a pianist, but he did as a composer and his character continued to be cheerful and optimistic.

As a composer, Durán can be placed in the first generation of musicians who developed the theory of Ecuadorian musical nationalism. Besides folk music, he liked to compose classical music and chamber music. He also wrote articles for several magazines and newspapers.

In 1946 he began suffering from nephritis, and he died at the age of 71 on January 13, 1947.

In 1911 Durán Cárdenas married Valentina Miranda. They did not have children.

== Works ==
=== Songs ===
- Campanas lúgubres (lugubrious bells), piano
- Canción (song), choir of 4 equal voices, 2 tenors y 2 basses a capella
- Canción de cuna (lullaby), voice and piano
- Canción de otoño (autumn song), voice and piano
- Corazón no llores más (don't cry anymore, my heart), baritone and piano
- El pescador (the fisherman), voice and piano
- En vibrante melodía (the vibrant melody), voice and piano,
- Hadas (fairies), voice and piano
- Hallazgo (discovery), choir of 3 equal voices
- Inca yayalla: Atahualpa el más grande quiteño: su muerte impía (Inca yayalla: Atahualpa the greatest Quito native: his unholy death /native poetry, voice and piano
- La campana (the bell) (school song), choir of one voice and piano
- La agricultura (the agriculture) (no originals nor copies preserved)
- Madre (mother), voice and piano
- Navidad: canción infantil (christmas: children's song), voice and piano
- Overtura (overture) voice and piano
- Pinares (pinewoods), choir with soloists plus 3 light voices
- Rondel, violin and piano
- Reville D’Album, piano, published on Hélice journa (1926)
- Tengo (I have), text, voice and piano

=== Pasillos and waltzes ===
- A Colombia (To Colombia), piano, I award in 1928 (Colombia); (Pasillo)
- Artículo 8 del Código Civil (8th article of civil code), piano, (Pasillo)
- Brumas (mists), piano, published in Quito journal, 1922; (Pasillo)
- Ecos (echoes), piano, (Pasillo)
- La Lira Quiteña (the Quito lyre). (Pasillo)
- Myosotis, piano, published in Quito journal, 1922; (Pasillo)
- Recuerdos (memories), piano, (Pasillo)
- Siempre (always), piano; (Pasillo)
- Brisas chilenas (Chilean breezes) (Waltz)
- Corso de flores (flowers parade), piano, (Waltz)
- Hipatia; (Waltz)
- Mariposas (butterflies), piano, (Waltz)
- Mariposas doradas (golden butterflies), piano, (Waltz)
- Nostalgias, piano, ca. 1919; (Waltz)
- Petite vals (little waltz), piano, (Waltz)
- Veinte de Julio (July twentieth), piano (Waltz)

=== Operas and zarzuelas ===
- Cumandá, in 4 acts; soloists, choir and orchestra. (Opera)
- Mariana, in 1 act; soloists, choir. (Opera)
- La leyenda del monte (the legend of the mountain), voices and piano reduction, ca. 1910; (Zarzuela)
- La hija del banquero (the banker's daughter) (Zarzuela)

=== Anthems ===
- A Espejo (To Espejo), choir of one voice and piano
- América, choir of 4 mixed voices and piano,
- Amor filial (filial love), choir and chamber ensemble;
- Ecuador, mixed choir of 4 voices and piano
- El remero (the rower), choir of one voice and piano
- Escuela Industrial Bolívar (Industrial School Bolivar), choir of one voice and piano
- Escuela Profesional de Señoritas (Professional Ladies School)
- Escuela Rosa Pérez Pallares (School Rosa Perez Pallares), choir of 2 voices and piano
- Escuela Rosa Zárate (School Rosa Zarate), choir of one voice and piano
- Guayaquil, choir of one voice and piano
- Himno a Alfaro (Anthem for Alfaro) (no originals nor copies preserved)
- Himno a Juan Montalvo (Anthem for Juan Montalvo), texto; choir of one voice and piano
- Himno a la Confederación de Militares Retirados (Anthem for the Confederation of retired soldiers)
- Himno a la Universidad Central (Central University Anthem), voice and piano
- Himno de amor y paz (Love and Peace Anthem), choir of one voice and piano
- Himno del Chofer (Drivers anthem)
- Himno del Pensionado Borja (Antehm for pensioner Borja), one voice and piano
- Himno escolar Liceo Fernández Madrid (High school anthem Fernandez Madrid); voice and piano
- Himno Provincial del Tungurahua (provincial anthem of Tungurahua) / Remigio Romero y Cordero, text; choir and piano
- Quito, one voice and piano
- Vicente León, symphony orchestra (another version for soprano, choir and piano)
- Viva Chile (long live Chile)

=== Marches ===
- Abdón Calderón: triumphal march (no originals nor copies preserved)
- Aviación (aviation), choir of one voice and piano
- A Sucre (To Sucre), voice and piano
- Ayacucho, band (no originals nor copies preserved);
- Bolívar, choir of one voice and piano
- Ecuador, choir of one voice and piano
- Escuela primaria (elementary school) (school march) choir of one voice and piano
- Frine: marcha triunfal (triumphal march), symphony orchestra
- Gladiador (gladiator), piano
- Marcha deportiva (sports march), choir of one voice and piano
- Marcha escolar bolivariana (bolivarian school march), printed in 1930;
- Marcha universitaria: Himno de la Universidad Central (university march: Central University Anthem), male choir of 2 voices and piano, printed in 1932;
- Patria (fatherland), choir of one voice and piano
- Scouts march, choir and piano
- Sol de Ayacucho (sun of Ayacucho), band
- Sucre Invicto (undefeated Sucre), band
- Venezuela: marcha triunfal (Venezuela: triumphal march), piano

== Sources ==
- Guerrero Gutiérrez, Fidel Pablo. 1996. “Recordando a Sixto María Durán.” El Diablo Ocioso: Revista Musical Ecuatoriana EDO, no. 2: 2–16. https://search.ebscohost.com/login.aspx?direct=true&AuthType=ip,uid&db=ram&AN=A2105027&site=ehost-live.
