= Antonio Neumane =

Ecuadorian musician, composer of the national anthem (1818–1871)

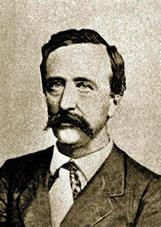
- Born: June 13, 1818; Corsica, France
- Died: March 3, 1871 (aged 52); Quito, Ecuador
- Occupations: Composer, Pianist, Orchestra director
- Spouse: Idálide Iturri
- Writing career
- Notable work: "Salve, Oh Patria" (the national anthem of Ecuador)

Antonio Neumane (June 13, 1818 – March 3, 1871) was a composer, pianist, and orchestra director. His most notable work is the music of the Ecuadorian National Anthem "Salve, Oh Patria" with the text written by Juan León Mera.

== Biography ==
Antonio Neumane was born in Corsica, France on June 13, 1818, as Antonio Neumann. Both his parents, Serafín Neumann and Margarita Marno, were German. He studied at a music conservatory in Vienna despite his parents’ wishes that he study medicine.

In 1834 he moved to Milan, Italy where he taught at a music academy. Three years later he returned to Austria and got married but became a widower only a few months later. In 1837 Emperor Ferdinand I of Austria awarded him for the composition of some arrangements he had made for the Spanish opera singer Maria Malibrán.

In 1839 Antonio Neumane remarried to Idálide Iturri from Turin, Italy. He then worked as conductor of the orchestra of an opera company directed by Luigi Bazzani, with which he toured several countries such as Cuba and Jamaica. In 1842 he arrived with the same company to Guayaquil, Ecuador, where he settled, taking up residence in Las Peñas neighborhood, where years before Simon Bolivar and Jose de San Martin met to discuss the future of South American independence. In his later years Neumane was the President of the Senate of Ecuador.

Neumane is known today as the composer of the Ecuadorian National Anthem, which was performed for the first time on August 10, 1870, in the Independence Square of Quito, with Neumane as the orchestra director. His other written compositions were lost in the Great Fire of Guayaquil of 1896.

In 1870, the Ecuadorian President Gabriel García Moreno hired him to establish and be the first director of the National Conservatory in Quito.

Antonio Neumane died on March 3, 1871.
