= Anti-Spanish sentiment =

Fear or hatred of Spanish people or culture

Anti-Spanish sentiment is the fear, distrust, hatred of, aversion to, or discrimination against Spanish people, culture, or nationhood.

Instances of anti-Spanish prejudice, often embedded within anti-Catholic prejudice and propaganda, were stoked in Europe in the early modern period, pursuant to the Spanish Crown's status as a power siding with the Counter-Reformation. The Spanish colonization of the Americas was also singled out as uniquely barbarous by some commentators. 20th-century Spanish historiography shaped the construct of "Black Legend" to denote such manifestations of prejudice, generally overplaying their reach and pervasiveness. The justification of the civil wars from which new republics emerged independent from Spanish rule in the Americas also partially relied on a hispanophobic discourse.

Within Spain, elements of stateless nationalist movements (such as Catalan, Basque, and Galician) competing with Spanish nationalism embrace anti-Spanish views and discourse.

== History ==
=== "Black legend" ===
Early instances of hispanophobia arose as the influence of the Spanish Empire and the Spanish Inquisition spread throughout Europe during the Late Middle Ages. Hispanophobia then materialized in folklore that is sometimes referred to as the "black legend":

The legend first arose amid the religious strife and imperial rivalries of 16th-century Europe. Northern Europeans, who loathed Catholic Spain and envied its American empire, published books and gory engravings which depicted Spanish colonization as uniquely barbarous: an orgy of greed, slaughter and papist depravity, the Inquisition writ large.

La leyenda negra, as Spanish historians first named it, entailed a view of Spaniards as "unusually cruel, avaricious, treacherous, fanatical, superstitious, hot-blooded, corrupt, decadent, indolent, and authoritarian". During the European colonization of the Americas, "[t]he Black Legend informed Anglo Americans' judgments about the political, economic, religious, and social forces that had shaped the Spanish provinces from Florida to California, as well as throughout the hemisphere". These judgments were handed down from Europeans who saw the Spaniards as inferior to other European cultures.

In North America, hispanophobia thus preceded the United States Declaration of Independence by almost 200 years. Historians theorize that North European nations promoted hispanophobia in order to justify attacks on Spain's colonies in the Americas. New Englanders engaged in hispanophobic efforts to assimilate Spanish colonies:

[I]n North America a deep current of Hispanophobia pervades Anglo-Saxon culture. ... As early as the late seventeenth century, we find Puritan divines like Cotton Mather and Samuel Sewell studying Spanish—with a view to winning converts to their version of Protestantism. Sewell spoke of "bombing [sic] Santo Domingo, Havana, Puerto Rico, and Mexico itself" with the Spanish Bible, and Cotton Mather even wrote a book on Protestant doctrine in Spanish, published in Boston in 1699, intended for—as he might say—the darker regions of Spanish America.

=== Nazi Germany ===
For the Nazis, the psychology of the Spaniards deemed incompatible with the ideal Nazi Germans, particularly regarding their Catholicism. Also, Ottavio de Peppo noted that Spaniards' religious sentiments were useful to weaken Germany's position because of that contempt of the Nazis to the Spanish psychology. Hitler himself said that "All of Spain is contained in Don Quixote—-a decrepit society unaware the world has passed it by", because Spain was a stagnant nation dominated by three elements that Nazis detested: the Church, the aristocracy, and the monarchy, since Franco had promised a royal restoration. Hitler praised the Arab occupation of Iberia as "cultivated," while referring to the Spaniards themselves as "lazy" and of "moorish blood"; he also slandered the Catholic Queen Isabel, calling her "the greatest whore in history." The German writer Wilhelm Pferdekamp published many hispanophobic articles, including one titled Afrika beginnt hinter den Pyrenäen ("Africa begins behind the Pyrenees").

== In Europe ==
=== England ===
Anti-Spanish sentiment in England is rooted in the historical rivalry and resulting mutual antipathy between British and Spanish empires.

Anglo-Spanish relations were not significantly hostile until the Age of Discovery and the rise of European colonialism in the 16th century, in which both countries' interests came into conflict due to the European colonization of the Americas. Spain was the first European power to secure control over vast areas of the New World, and an outright antagonism soon developed with England as the latter pursued its own colonial enterprises in the Americas once economic benefits became apparent. The English Reformation encountered resistance from Catholics within the broader Counter-Reformation movement; Spain's status as a Catholic power as well as its opposition to the Protestantism led to anti-Spanish and anti-Catholic sentiments in England to go hand-in-hand for centuries to come. Conflicting religions and imperial ambitions, along other factors contributed in prompting both countries to seek leadership of opposing sides during major geopolitical conflicts in Europe and the Americas which led to multiple Anglo-Spanish Wars until the 19th century.

Despite a warming in relations from the 20th century onwards, issues such as disputes over the status of Gibraltar still cause tensions between the two countries. A 2013 poll revealed that, regardless of the dispute over Gibraltar, 17.9% of British respondents rated the relations between UK and the Spain as "bad", with 1.9% rating them as "very bad".

=== Catalonia, the Basque Country and Galicia ===
During the 20th century, individuals with nationalist views emerged who used ethnic or racial nationalism to distinguish themselves from Spain. One of the earliest examples was Sabino Arana, regarded as the father of Basque nationalism, who on several occasions made racist remarks about Spaniards. In issue 27 of the newspaper Bizkaitarra, Arana expressed his disdain for non-Basque Spaniards, whom he disparagingly referred to as maketos, writing: “More than men, they resemble apes, scarcely less beastly than the gorilla; do not look for in their faces the expression of human intelligence or any virtue; their gaze reveals only idiocy and brutality.” He also wrote: “Our people's contact with the Spanish immediately and inevitably leads to ignorance and a loss of intellect, weakness, and corruption of the heart among our race.”

In the case of Catalan nationalism, there was an ethnocentric component that sought to connect Catalan nationalism with purportedly “scientific” foundations. The aim was to distinguish “European and Aryan” Catalans from “African” or “Semitic” Spaniards. Pompeu Gener, a Catalan publicist and playwright with Social Darwinist ideas, wrote in his work Heregías (1887): “There is too much Semitic and Berber blood scattered across the peninsula for modern science to become widespread among most of its peoples [...] Spain is paralyzed by the necrosis caused by the blood of inferior races such as the Semitic, Berber, and Mongoloid [...]”. Bartomeu Robert, a Catalan politician and physician, gave a lecture in 1899 entitled “The Catalan Race”, in which he compared the cranial capacity of Catalans with that of people from other parts of Spain. The lecture caused controversy elsewhere in Spain. Today, there is a statue of him in Barcelona's Plaça de Tetuan.

The Galician intellectual Alfonso Daniel Rodríguez Castelao, in his work Sempre en Galiza (1944), wrote about an alleged “Aryan” racial purity of Galicians in contrast to a mixed-race and “Semitic” Spain: “There exists in Galicia a homogeneity of character, so deeply rooted in its native, centuries-old identity, and so contrary to the Castilian spirit, that we often fall into unpleasant temptations, such as proclaiming that we are Aryans and the others Semites.”

During and after the Francoist period, Catalan racism was directed particularly toward Andalusians, many of whom immigrated to Catalonia and came to be known as charnegos. Andalusians were stereotyped as poor or uneducated, in contrast to an educated and industrious Catalonia. Former Catalan president Jordi Pujol described the Andalusian man in La immigració, problema català (1976) as “anarchic”, living in “a state of cultural, mental and spiritual ignorance and misery”, adding that, if they had sufficient numerical strength, they would destroy Catalonia with their “anarchic and impoverished” mentality. In 1997, when Pujol was serving as President of the Generalitat, he said in an interview with Cadena SER that his statements about Andalusians had been a “grave mistake”. Francesc Homs, spokesman for the former government of Artur Mas, stated: “Here [in Catalonia], there were people in the 19th century who decided to undertake the Industrial Revolution, while in other parts of Spain they were herding goats and did not even consider it... We can either look to Andalusia or we can look to the Germans.”

Catalan public broadcaster TV3 has been described as expressing anti-Spanish sentiment through humour or banal nationalism, such as the joke “Puta Espanya” ("Fuck Spain"), which has become typical among some sectors of Catalan nationalism.

== Americas ==
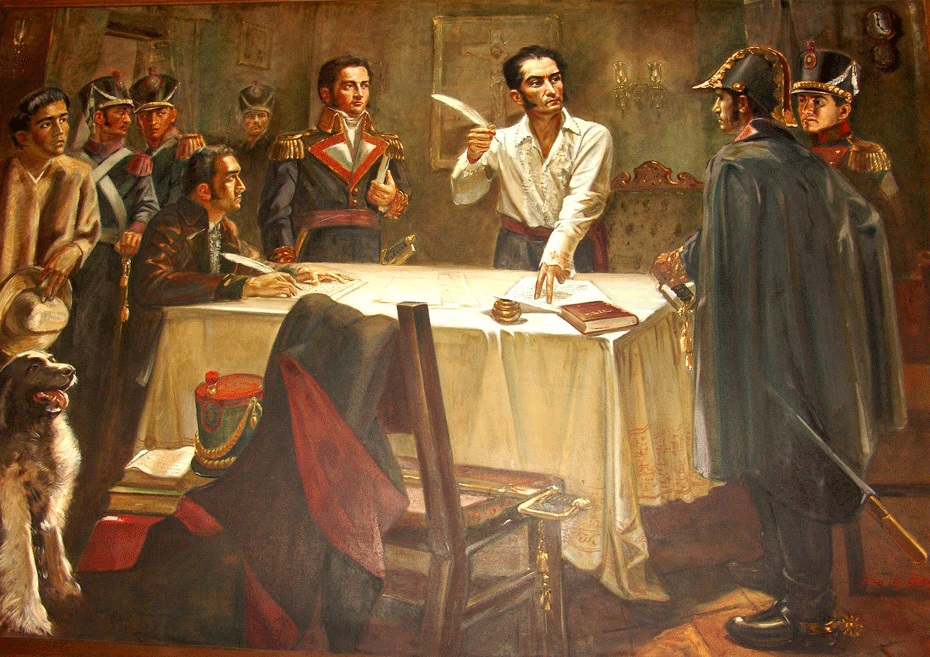
Depiction of Simón Bolívar signing the Decree of War to the Death against Spaniards in 1813

In the 19th century, the justification of the Spanish American wars of independence relied on blaming Spain and its legacy for all of the ills of the New World, with the remaining insignificant Peninsular and Canarian population in the new republics being subsequently harassed, extorted and eventually expelled. Various independence leaders had studied in Europe, coming into contact with Enlightment ideals that made them favour aspects of French Republicanism and British parliamentarism ranging from incompatible to directly hostile towards Spain's monarchy, which they saw as oppressive, backwards and corrupt.

=== Mexico ===
According to historian Marco Antonio Landavazo, anti-Spanish sentiment in Mexico is underpinned by basic ideas that are synthesized in the interpretation of the conquest as genocide, the identification of an intrinsically perverse character in the Spaniards and, therefore, the need for the extermination and expulsion of the "gachupín".

This sentiment, already extant in the 17th century, gained notoriety in the wake of the Mexican War of Independence (1810-1821), and was articulated from then on as one of the tenets of the Mexican national building, urgently pushed by elements of the political class of the young country, with the result of the hardening of the borders of its political community.

Thus, already towards the heights of 1810, an independence hero like the priest Miguel Hidalgo decried the Spaniards as "denaturalized men" moved by "sordid greed" and whose only god was money.

Throughout the 1820s, Spaniards were quantitatively insignificant (estimated by Harold Sims at 6500 people out of a population of about 6.5 million) but many of them―despite a certain heterogeneous social extraction shown in recent research―held an important influence in the economic, military and political elites of the First Mexican Republic.

Anti-Spanish sentiment gained momentum in the Mexican public sphere towards by the late 1820s, with decrees in 1827 and 1829 calling for the expulsion of all peninsulares residing in Mexico. In the context of a growth of Mexican nationalism, the preponderance of Spanish landowners and merchants in Guerrero led mulatto militias to murder several Spanish merchants in 1827 and 1828. Anti-Spanish sentiment was one of the causes behind the sacking of the Parián market in Mexico City in 1828. Anti-Spanish sentiment motivated twelve state expulsion laws published in 1827, three federal laws of December 1827, March 1829 and January 1833, and two decrees, in January 1833 and 1834. Two years later, the definitive Treaty of Peace and Friendship between Mexico and Spain was signed.

This process resulted in the effective expulsion of almost half of the Spanish population from Mexico.

The murder of Spaniards—sometimes amidst cries of "death to whites", to "Spaniards" or to "gachupines"—lingered during the 1840s and 1850s in the countryside of the states of Guerrero, Morelos and Yucatán, spurred by the tension between Spanish hacienda owners and the impoverished indigenous peasantry, even though the behavior of the former did not differ substantially from that of the Criollo hacienda owners.

Although lesser in terms of casualties than xenophobic outbursts of anti-American and Sinophobic sign, anti-Spanish sentiment manifested itself during the Mexican Revolution of 1910, with slightly more than 200 Spaniards killed.

=== United States ===
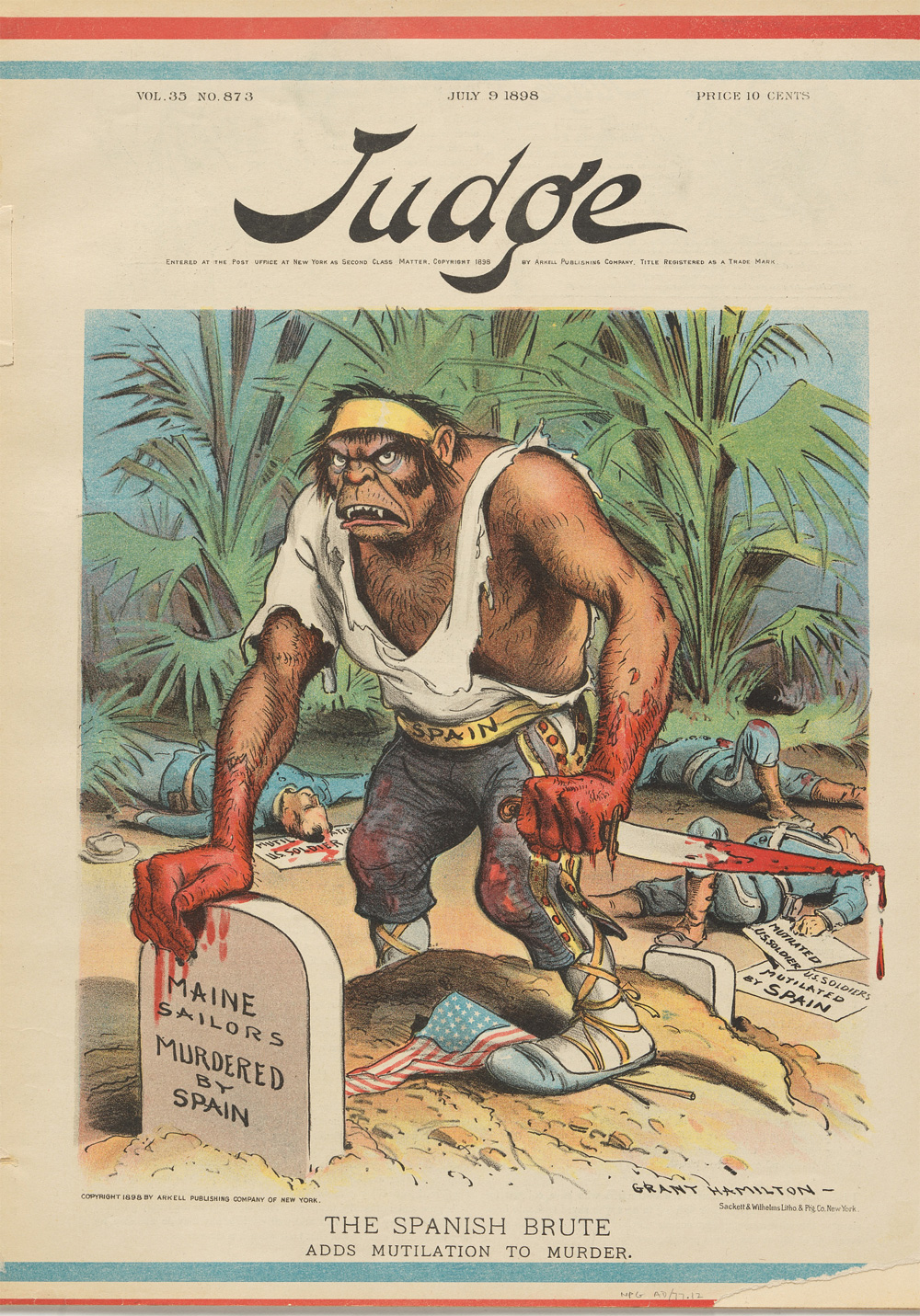
Anti-Spanish propaganda depicting a dehumanized personification of Spain ('the Spanish Brute') in satirical magazine Judge (July 1898)

Upon independence, American Anglo-Protestant elites inherited a suspicion against Spain owing to their British colonial past. However, relations between the US and Spain were cordial, and Spain was initially well-regarded due to its support during the American Revolutionary War.

In the 1890s anti-Spanish propaganda was disseminated by outlets published by the likes of Joseph Pulitzer and William Randolph Hearst, aiming to set the mood of the public opinion in favour of War against Spain.

== See also ==
- África empieza en los Pirineos
- Anti-Catalan sentiment

== Sources ==
- William D. Carrigan and Clive Webb, "The Lynching of Persons of Mexican Origin or Descent in the United States, 1848 to 1928," Journal of Social History, vol. 37, no. 2 (Winter 2003), pp. 411–438. In JSTOR.
- Juan Francisco Maura, "La hispanofobia a través de algunos textos de la conquista de América: de la propaganda política a la frivolidad académica," Bulletin of Spanish Studies, vol. 83, no. 2 (2006), pp. 213–240.
- Aviña, Alexander (2014). Specters of Revolution: Peasant Guerrillas in the Cold War Mexican Countryside. Oxford: Oxford University Press. ISBN 978-0-19-993657-1.
- Jackson, Robert Howard; Castillo, Edward D. (1995). Indians, Franciscans, and Spanish Colonization: The Impact of the Mission System on California Indians. Albuquerque: The University of New Mexico Press. ISBN 0-8263-1753-7.
- Landavazo, Marco Antonio (2005). "Imaginarios encontrados. El antiespañolismo en México en los siglos XIX y XX" (PDF). Tzintzun. Revista de Estudios Históricos (42). Morelia: Universidad Michoacana de San Nicolás de Hidalgo: 33–48. ISSN 1870-719X.
- Lomnitz, Claudio (2001). Deep Mexico, Silent Mexico: An Anthropology of Nationalism. Minneapolis: The University of Minnesota Press. ISBN 0-8166-3289-8.
- Pani, Erika (2003). "De coyotes y gallinas: Hispanidad, identidad nacional y comunidad política durante la expulsión de españoles". Revista de Indias. 63 (228). Madrid: Consejo Superior de Investigaciones Científicas: 355–374. ISSN 0034-8341.
