= Lists of musicians =

This is a list of lists of musicians.

== Genre ==
- Lists of a cappella groups
- Lists of blues musicians by genre
- Lists of Christian bands and artists by genre
- Lists of composers
- Lists of country music artists
- Lists of dance musicians
- Lists of hip-hop artists
- Lists of jazz artists
- Lists of pop artists
- Lists of rock artists

== Instrument ==
- List of accordionists
- List of banjo players
- List of jazz banjoists
- List of bassoonists
- List of beatboxers
- List of cellists
- List of clarinetists
- List of club DJs
- List of contemporary classical double bass players
- List of historical classical double bass players
- List of jazz bassists
- List of drummers
  - List of female drummers
  - List of jazz drummers
- List of Appalachian dulcimer players
- List of hammered dulcimer players
- List of flautists
- List of guitarists
  - List of bass guitarists
  - List of classical guitarists
  - List of jazz guitarists
  - List of lead guitarists
  - List of rhythm guitarists
  - List of slide guitarists
- List of harmonicists
- List of harpists
  - List of classical harpists
- List of harpsichordists
- List of horn players
- List of keyboardists
- List of mandolinists
- List of mandolinists (sorted)
- List of oboists
- List of organists
  - List of jazz organists
- List of percussionists
  - List of jazz percussionists
  - List of classical pianists
  - List of classical pianists (recorded)
  - List of jazz pianists
  - List of pop and rock pianists
  - List of ragtime pianists
  - List of women classical pianists
- List of piccolo players
- List of pipe bands
- List of saxophonists
  - List of jazz saxophonists
- Lists of singers
  - List of lead vocalists
  - List of singer-songwriters
  - List of classical trombonists
  - List of jazz trombonists
- List of trumpeters
  - List of jazz trumpeters
- List of tuba players
- List of vibraphonists
  - List of jazz vibraphonists
- Lists of violinists
  - List of classical violinists
  - List of contemporary classical violinists
  - List of electric violinists
  - List of female violinists
  - List of fiddlers
  - List of Indian violinists
  - List of jazz violinists
  - List of Persian violinists
  - List of popular music violinists
- List of violists

== Nationality ==
=== Africa ===
- List of African musicians
- List of Egyptian composers
- List of Ghanaian musicians
- List of South African musicians
- List of Nigerian musicians
- List of Ugandan musicians

=== Asia ===
- Afghan
  - List of Afghan singers
  - List of Pashto singers
- Azerbaijanis
  - List of Azerbaijani composers
  - List of Azerbaijani opera singers
- Chinese
  - List of Chinese composers
  - List of Chinese musicians
- Filipino
  - List of Philippine-based music groups
- Indonesians
  - List of Indonesian pop musicians
  - List of Indonesian musicians and musical groups
- Iranians
  - List of Iranian composers
  - List of Iranian musicians
  - List of Iranian singers
  - List of Iranian hip hop artists
- Israelis
  - List of Israeli classical composers
  - List of Israeli musical artists
- Indians
  - List of Carnatic instrumentalists
  - List of Indian composers
  - List of Indian film music directors
  - List of Indian playback singers
  - List of bands from Delhi
- Japanese
  - List of J-pop artists
  - List of Japanese musicians
  - List of Japanese hip hop musicians
  - List of Japanoise artists
  - List of musical artists from Japan
- Pakistanis
  - List of Pakistani ghazal singers
  - List of Pakistani musicians
  - List of Pakistani musical groups
  - List of Pakistani pop singers
  - List of Pakistani qawwali singers
- South Koreans
  - List of K-pop artists
  - List of South Korean idol groups
    - List of South Korean idol groups (1990s)
    - List of South Korean idol groups (2000s)
    - List of South Korean idol groups (2010s)
  - List of South Korean musicians
- Sri Lankans
  - List of Sri Lankan musicians
- Thai
  - List of Thai musical groups

=== Europe ===
- Austrians
  - List of Austrian composers
  - List of Austrians in music
- Belarusians
  - List of Belarusian musical groups
  - List of Belarusian musicians
- Belgian
  - List of Belgian bands and artists
- Britons
  - By location
    - England
      - List of music artists and bands from England
      - List of bands from Bristol
      - List of bands and artists from Merseyside
      - List of bands originating in Leeds
      - List of Cornish musicians
      - List of music artists and bands from Manchester
    - Scotland
      - List of bands from Glasgow
      - List of Scottish musicians
    - Wales
      - List of Welsh musicians
  - By genre or type
    - List of British blues musicians
    - List of British classical composers
    - List of British Invasion artists
    - List of performers on Top of the Pops
    - List of punk bands from the United Kingdom
    - List of UK garage artists
    - List of UK noise musicians
- Bulgarian
  - List of Bulgarian musicians and singers
- Czech
  - List of Czech musical groups
- Danes
  - List of Danish composers
  - List of Danish musicians
- Dutch
  - List of Dutch composers
  - List of Dutch hip hop musicians
  - List of Dutch musicians
- Finns
  - List of bands from Finland
  - List of Finnish jazz musicians
  - List of Finnish composers
  - List of Finnish musicians
  - List of Finnish singers
- French
  - List of French composers
  - List of French singers
- Germans
  - List of German composers
  - List of German musicians
- Greeks
  - List of Greek composers
  - List of Greek musical artists
- Iceland
  - List of bands from Iceland
- Italians
  - Chronological list of Italian classical composers
  - List of Italian composers
- Norwegians
  - List of Norwegian musicians
- Polish
  - List of Polish musicians and musical groups
- Portuguese
  - List of Portuguese musicians
  - List of Portuguese singers
- Romanians
  - List of Romanian composers
  - List of Romanian musicians
  - List of Romanian singers
- Russians
  - List of Russian composers
  - List of Russian opera singers
- Serbian
  - List of Serbian musicians
- Slovenian
  - List of Slovenian musicians
- Spaniards
  - List of bands from Spain
  - List of Spanish musicians
- Swedes
  - List of bands from Gothenburg
  - List of In Flames band members
  - List of Swedes in music
  - List of Swedish death metal bands
  - List of Swedish hip hop musicians
- Turks
  - List of Turkish musicians
  - List of Turkish pop musicians
- Ukrainians
  - List of Ukrainian opera singers

=== North America ===
- Americans
  - By location
    - California
      - List of bands from Los Angeles
      - List of bands from the San Francisco Bay Area
      - List of Los Angeles rappers
      - List of music directors of the Ojai Music Festival
      - List of musicians from the Inland Empire
    - Illinois
      - List of musicians from Chicago
    - Maryland
      - List of Maryland music groups
      - List of Maryland music people
    - New York
      - List of bands formed in New York City
      - List of hip hop musicians from New York City
      - List of New York hardcore bands
    - Texas
      - List of Houston rappers
      - List of musicians from Denton, Texas
    - Other states
      - List of bands from Lincoln, Nebraska
      - List of Chicago hardcore punk bands
      - List of hip hop musicians from Atlanta
      - List of musicians from Seattle
      - List of Utah musical groups
      - List of American folk musicians in Washington
  - By genre or type
    - List of American death metal bands
    - List of American female country singers
    - List of American grunge bands
    - List of Delta blues musicians
    - List of The Minus 5 members
    - List of Native American musicians
    - List of one-hit wonders in the United States
    - List of symphony orchestras in the United States
- Canadians
  - List of bands from Canada
  - List of Canadian composers
  - List of Canadian musicians
  - By location
    - British Columbia
      - List of bands from British Columbia
      - List of musicians from British Columbia
    - Manitoba
      - List of Winnipeg musicians
    - Nova Scotia
      - List of musical groups from Halifax, Nova Scotia
    - Quebec
      - List of Anglo-Quebecer musicians
      - List of Montreal music groups
      - List of musicians from Quebec
- Native American
  - List of Native American musicians
- Jamaicans
  - List of Jamaican musicians

=== South America ===
- Argentine
  - List of Argentine musicians
- Ecuadorian
  - List of Ecuadorian musicians
- Brazilians
  - List of Brazilian composers
  - List of Brazilian musicians
- Salvadoran
  - List of Salvadoran hip hop musicians
- Latin American
  - List of Latin American rock musicians

=== Oceania ===
- Australians
  - List of Australian composers
  - List of Australian female composers
  - List of Indigenous Australian musicians
- New Zealanders
  - List of musical artists from New Zealand
  - List of New Zealand musicians

== Miscellaneous ==
- List of all-female bands
- List of anarchist musicians
- List of atheists in music
- List of band name etymologies
- List of bands named after other performers' songs
- List of best-selling boy bands
- List of best-selling girl groups
- List of best-selling music artists
- List of calypso musicians
- List of child music prodigies
- List of crooners
- List of deaths in popular music
- List of dub artists
- List of experimental musicians
- List of girl groups
- List of honorifics given to artists in popular music
- List of instrumental bands
- List of lo-fi musicians
- List of lovers rock artists
- List of multilingual bands and artists
- List of music arrangers
- List of musical band types
- List of musicians known for destroying instruments
- List of musicians who play left-handed
- List of nicknames of blues musicians
- List of nicknames of jazz musicians
- List of power trios
- List of radio orchestras
- List of reggae musicians
- List of reggae fusion artists
- List of reggaeton musicians
- List of rocksteady musicians
- List of roots reggae artists
- List of royal musicians
- List of ska musicians
- List of symphony orchestras
- List of vocal groups

== See also ==
- Lists of people by occupation
- Portal:Music
