= List of Ecuadorian musicians =

This is a list of notable Ecuadorian musicians across all fields of music in alphabetical order by surname and first name as given by the Ecuadorian dictionary of biography.

== B ==
- Bonilla Chávez, Carlos, classical guitarist
- Brescia, Domingo
- Bueno Arévalo Julio Fernando

== C ==
- Christopher Vélez

== E ==
- Espín Yépez, Enrique

== G ==
- Guevara Viteri Luis Gerardo
- Olga Gutiérrez (1928–2015), pasillo singer

== I ==
- Silvana Ibarra (born 1959), singer, actress and politician

== J ==
- Juan Fernando Velasco

== L ==
- Lila Álvarez Garcia

== M ==
- Maiguashca Guevara, Mesías Declory

== R ==
- Rodas Dávila, Arturo - composer

== S ==
- Saade, Jorge - violinist
- Salgado Torres Luis Humberto - composer
- Edith Rosario Bermeo Cisneros -singer

== V ==
- Villalba Jervis, María Gabriela
