= List of Belarusian musicians =

This is a list of famous Belarusian musicians and singers:

- KRIWI
- N.R.M.
- Parason
- Reido
- Kraski
- Stary Olsa
- Litesound
- Maimuna
- Molchat Doma
- Pyti

== See also ==
- List of Belarusians
- Lists of musicians
