= List of Thai musical groups =

List of Thai musical groups.

== 0–9 ==
- 4Eve

== A ==
- Apartment Khunpa
- Atlas (boy band)

== B ==
- Big Ass
- Bodyslam (band)
- Boyscout (Thai band)
- BUS (band)
- Byrd & Heart

== C ==
- Carabao
- Caravan (Thai band)
- Chaliang (band)
- China Dolls
- Clash (Thai band)
- Clo'ver
- Cocktail (Thai band)

== E ==
- Endorphine (band)

== F ==
- Fahrenheit (Thai band)
- Fame (Thai band)
- Faye Fang Kaew
- Felizz
- FLIO

== G ==
- Getsunova
- Golf & Mike
- Grand Ex

== I ==
- The Impossibles (Thai band)
- The Innocent (Thai band)

== J ==
- JASP.ER

== K ==
- Keereeboon
- K-otic

== L ==
- LYKN

== M ==
- Micro (Thai band)

== N ==
- Neko Jump

== O ==
- The Ovation

== P ==
- Paradox (Thai band)
- Pause (band)
- Potato (band)

== S ==
- Sao Sao Sao
- Silly Fools
- Singular (band)
- So Cool (band)
- Stone Metal Fire
- The Sun (Thai rock band)

== T ==
- T-Skirt
