= Gerardo Guevara =

Ecuadorian composer (1930–2024)

Gerardo Guevara (23 September 1930 – 23 December 2024) was an Ecuadorian composer. His work combines native and contemporary music.

== Biography ==
Born in Quito, Gerardo Guevara showed music ability at an early age. Because his father worked as a caretaker at the Conservatorio Nacional, Guevara used to eavesdrop on the music dictations that were being given to older children and sometimes ventured to shout the answer before running away. When he was fifteen he started studying composition with Luis H. Salgado. In 1952, while playing the piano in an orchestra in Guayaquil, he studied composition and the analysis of Bartok's music with the Hungarian musician Jorge Aq.

From 1959 onwards and thanks to a Unesco grant, Guevara studied composition with Nadia Boulanger at the École Normale de Musique de Paris where he graduated as a conductor. While in Paris, he also studied musicology at the University of La Sorbonne. After twelve years in France, he went back to Ecuador where in 1972 he formed the choir of the Central University of Quito. A year later, he created the Sayce (Society for the protection of musicians).

He acted as a conductor of the National Symphony Orchestra from 1974–75 and director of the Conservatorio Nacional (1980–88) where he taught composition and the history of Ecuadorian Music.

Mainly nationalist he nonetheless explored contemporary techniques, which led Robert Stevenson to write: "Guevara Viteri has drawn on European styles". More appropriately Béhague comments: "more advanced techniques of composition appeared in some of the works of Gerardo Guevara". A prolific composer, he has also written essays and articles on music. As a teacher he also had a profound influence on his students.

Guevara died on 23 December 2024, at the age of 94.

== Works ==
- Inspiración for piano, 1950 (world premiere 2011 by Alex Alarcon Fabre)
- Despedida, pasillo, 1957
- Apanny Shungo for piano, 1958
- Yaguar shungo ballet for symphony orchestra and choir 1958
- Geografía for baritone and piano (texts by Jorge Enrique Adoum), 1960
- Tierras for baritone and piano (text by Jorge Carrera Andrade), 1960
- First string quartet, 1960
- El Hombre Planetario for baritone and piano (texts by Carrera Andrade), 1962
- Tres preludios for piano: Recitativo, Albazo and Sanjuanito, 1963
- Cantata de la paz for baritone, orchestra and choir 1963-64
- Second string quartet, 1963–64
- Atahualpa for choir, 1965
- Indios for choir, 1965
- Se va con algo mío, pasillo, 1967
- Danzante del destino, for pinkillu, pan flute, harp, bombo, 2 guitars, contralto solo, choir, 1967
- Danzante de la Ausencia, choir, 1967
- Yaraví del desterrado, 1967
- Tuyallay, 1967
- Ismos for violin, viola, cello, oboe, clarinet and piano, 1970
- Ecuador, orchestral suite, 1972
- 5 Miniaturas (Panecillo, Pichincha, La Compañía, Avenida Veinticuatro de Mayo, Quito Norte) for flute, French horn, oboe, clarinet and bassoon, 1973
- Quito arrabal del cielo for choir (text by Jorge Reyes), 1974
- Galería siglo XX de pintores ecuatorianos, orchestral suite, 1976
- El Panecillo, (texts by Eloy Proaño), 1977
- Solsticio de Verano, san juanito, 1977
- Tres melodías para soprano y orquesta de cámara texts by Ana María Iza (Iba a fugarme, Pasillo, Aquí me paro y grito), 1978
- Tríptico for choir, 1978
- El espantapájaros,
- Jaguay, vocal, 1980
- Combate poético for baritone and piano, 1980
- Otoño for voice and piano, 1980
- Fiesta for piano, 1982
- Diálogos for flute, piano (dedicated to Luciano Carrera), 1982
- Recitativo and Danza for guitar, 1983
- Juegos, 1983
- Suite Ecuatoriana, for flute and piano, 1985
- Cuaderno pedagógico for piano students, 1985–86
- Et in Terra Pax Hominibus for baritone and orchestra, text by J. E. Adoum, 1987
- Huayra Shina for soprano, baritone and orchestra, 1987
- pasillo for piano, 1988
- Historia for orchestra, 1990.
- Del maíz al trigo (tonada), 1993.
- De mestizo a mestizo for orchestra (in three movements), 1994

== Discography ==
- Gerardo Guevara: Melodías y canciones. Galo Cárdenas, Baritone; Marie Renée Portais, piano. Fediscos

Lp 5403, 1982.

- Música de nuestro tiempo, Ifesa (LP 301-0293)

Gerardo Guevara: Et in Terra Pax Hominibus for baritone & orchestra, text by Jorge Enrique Adoum.
other works by: M. Estévez, D. Luzuriaga, M. Maiguashca & A. Rodas
Orquesta Sinfónica Nacional conducted by Alvaro Manzano

- Despedida, Ifesa Lp-CME. Guayaquil 1958. Piano: Gerardo Gevara.
- Se va con algo mío in: Beatriz Parra, Noche lírica en Canal 2, record no. 2, IFESA Lp-206-B. Guayaquil, 1973.
- Danzante del destino. Victor 45 rpm PB9027. Sweden, 1977.
- Grandes temas de Música Ecuatoriana

Gerardo Guevara, El Espantapájaros
other works by: Sixto María Durán, Benítez & Valencia, etc
Piano, Marcelo Ortiz

- Souvenir de l'Amérique du Sud CD. Piano: Marcelo Ortiz

Pasillo (pasillo) (Gerardo Guevara)
Fiesta (albazo) (Gerardo Guevara)
Tonada (tonada) (Gerardo Guevara)
El espantapájaros (pasillo) (Gerardo Guevara)
Apamuy Shungo (danzante) (Gerardo Guevara)
Other works by: Luis H. Salgado, Enrique Espín Yépez, Sixto M. Durán, Miguel A. Casares

- Piano Music by Ecuadorian Composers CD. Piano: [Alex Alarcon Fabre]

Pasillo (pasillo) (Gerardo Guevara)
Fiesta (aire tipico) (Gerardo Guevara)
Albazo (albazo) (Gerardo Guevara)
Other works by: Luis H. Salgado, Claudio Aizaga, Corsino Durán, Juan Pablo Muñoz Sanz

== Bibliography ==
- "Gerardo Guevara", in: Grandes compositores ecuatorianos, edited by Pablo Guerrero (G. CONMÚSICA, 1999)
- Béhague, Gerard: "Ecuador. Art Music", in: The New Grove Dictionary of Music and Musicians, Second edition, edited by Stanley Sadie & John Tyrrel (London: Macmillan, 2001)
- Pérez Pimentel, Rodolfo: Diccionario Biografico Ecuatoriano
- Stevenson, Robert: "Quito", in: The New Grove Dictionary of Music and Musicians, Second edition, edited by Stanley Sadie & John Tyrrel (London: Macmillan, 2001)
- Walker, John L.: "The Younger Generation of Ecuadorian Composers", in: Latin American Music Review vol. 22, no. 2 (Fall/Winter 2001), pp. 199–213

== Writings ==
- "La música coral en Ecuador", in: Diners no. 1, March 1980, pp. 30-33 (Quito: Diners Club del Ecuador)
- "Segunda Sonata para piano de Luis H. Salgado", in: Opus, vol. 3, no. 31, pp. 48–51 (Quito: Central Bank of Ecuador)
- Vamos a cantar: cancionero popula (Quito: Ministerio de Educación y Cultura, 1991; repr. 1992)
