= List of ragtime pianists =

This is a list of notable ragtime pianists.

== List of ragtime pianists ==
Elliott Shapiro (1895–1956), son of music publisher Maurice Shapiro, in a 1951 article, offered a list of standout ragtime pianists – in two categories:

=== Ragtime pioneers ===
- Mike Bernard (1875–1936)
- George Botsford (1874–1949)
- Louis Chauvin (1881–1908)
- Ben Harney (1872–1938)
- Tony Jackson (1882–1921)
- Scott Joplin (1868–1917)
- Jelly Roll Morton (1890–1941)
- Tom Turpin (1871–1932)
- Percy Wenrich (1887–1952)

=== Later ragtimers ===
- Eubie Blake (1887–1983)
- Les C. Copeland (1887–1942)
- Ford Dabney (1883–1958)
- Luckey Roberts (1887–1968)
- J. Russel Robinson (1892–1963)
- Willie "The Lion" Smith (1893–1973)
- Fats Waller (1904–1943)
- Pete Wendling (1888–1974)

Many ragtime pianist, beginning around the 1920s, went on to perform stride and boogie-woogie and other lists of artists might be more identified with either. Shapiro's two lists above, exclude those who are known more as (i) non-piano ragtime composers (ii) ragtime revivalist (iii) stride pianists, and (iv) boogie-woogie pianists. Early standout ragtime pianists not on Shapiro's lists include:

=== Early ragtimers not on Shapiro's list ===
- Frank P. Banta (1870–1903)
- Euday L. Bowman (1887–1949)
- Brun Campbell (1884–1952)
- Hughie Cannon (1877–1912)
- Glover Compton (1884–1964)
- William Ezell (1892–1963)
- Blind Leroy Garnett (1897–1933)
- Wallie Herzer (1885–1961)
- Fred Hylands (1872–1913)
- Jean-Baptiste Lafrenière (1874–1912)
- Lewis F. Muir (1883–1915)
- James Scott (1885–1938)
- William Turk (1866–1911)
- Bee Walker (1898–1997)
- Arnold Wiley (1898–1964)

== See also ==
- List of ragtime musicians
