= Tommy Brookins =

American sportsman and entertainer

- Born: Thomas Robert Brookins; September 2, 1906; St Louis, Missouri, U.S.
- Died: June 1988 (aged 81); Sint Maarten, Netherlands Antilles
- Occupations: Singer, entertainer, sportsman

Thomas Robert Brookins (September 2, 1906 – June 1988) was an American sportsman and entertainer. He founded the basketball team that became the Harlem Globetrotters, and toured the world as one half of the vaudeville singing and comedy duo Brookins and Van.

== Biography ==
An African American, Brookins was born in St Louis, Missouri. He moved with his family to the South Side of Chicago as a child, attended Hyde Park High School, and graduated from Wendell Phillips High School, the only all black high school in the city. From 1923, he led the high school basketball team, becoming one of the leading local players by virtue of his speed and aggression, despite being of average height. In his teens, he also started singing occasionally in local clubs.

By 1926, Brookins led an all-black basketball team, the Savoy Big Five, who played exhibition games in the Savoy Ballroom before dances. A keen sportsman, he also played baseball for the Chicago Giants. In 1928, Brookins and several other players left the Big Five following a dispute, to form the Globe Trotters, and started touring around southern Illinois putting on exhibition matches, with singing and music between the games. Brookins hired businessman Abe Saperstein to promote and manage the team, and Saperstein gave them the name "Harlem Globe Trotters", recognizing Harlem's position as the center of black culture. When Saperstein started sending out several teams without Brookins' knowledge, Brookins left the organization.

In 1928, Brookins started singing regularly with Jimmie Noone's band in Chicago, and also sang with other bands including that led by Fes Williams. He moved to New York City with Noone and his band in 1930, and when there formed a song and dance trio with Arnold Wiley and Jesse Oliver. Brookins played piano and sang, and also developed comedy routines, working for a time in a duo with Bud Harris. He was seen by Fletcher Henderson, who then hired him as a singer for his orchestra's tour of Europe.

Brookins remained in Europe at the end of the Henderson tour, and met fellow entertainer Sammy Van (Samuel Vanderhurst, 1903–1959), originally from Charleston, South Carolina. They formed the duo, Brookins and Van, where they interspersed comedy sketches with Brookins singing and playing piano, and Van dancing. In Hull, England, in 1934, they were praised for their "new-style humour, polished tap dancing and pleasant singing". Based in Britain for several years, they became successful, described in one short film they made as "one of America's foremost comedy acts", and toured elsewhere in Europe, and in Australia.

Brookins and Van left Europe in 1939, shortly before the Second World War, and continued to perform in the United States. By this time, Brookins was a prosperous entertainer, able to pay for his luxury Hispano-Suiza car to be shipped back from Europe with him. He had a brief and well-publicised personal relationship with the singer Ethel Waters, and opened his own nightclub in Chicago. After the end of the war, he reunited with Van on the American theatre circuit.

In 1948, Brookins returned to Europe. In Paris, he performed from 1951 in a cabaret duo with white singer Laureen Fresno (real name Diane Ogilvie), the wife of an American psychiatrist, in a pairing which he considered would not succeed in the U.S. at that time "because the booking agents were afraid of an act made up of a Negro man and a white girl in a sophisticated role." He continued to work in Europe, mostly in Italy but also in France and Denmark, and was able to perform songs in several languages, including Yiddish. In Denmark, he made recordings of spirituals, issued in 1956, and also worked as a coach with the newly established Danish national basketball team.

He returned to the United States by 1958, when it was reported that he was working as a doorman at Piro's restaurant in San Francisco. He also worked in clubs in St Louis in the late 1950s, before moving to Hawaii. There, he continued to perform, and also became politically active, supporting the Honolulu mayoral campaigns of Neal Blaisdell in the early 1960s.

In 1964, he was appointed by Mayor Richard J. Daley as acting director of several urban progress programs in Chicago, set up as part of the War on Poverty. These were generally seen as positions filled through political patronage. Among the programs initiated by Brookins was the Little Theater, in which children could develop their skills as actors, writers and entertainers.

Brookins moved to the Caribbean island of Sint Maarten, part of the Netherlands Antilles, in 1969. There, he opened the Portofino Italian restaurant in Philipsburg.

He died in Sint Maarten, aged 81; his funeral took place on June 4, 1988.
