= List of Belarusian musical groups =

This is a list of Belarusian bands.

- BeZ bileta
- Bristeil
- Hair Peace Salon
- IOWA
- Jitters (band)
- KRIWI
- Litesound
- Molchat Doma
- N.R.M.
- Naviband
- Nebulae Come Sweet
- Neuro Dubel
- Open Space
- Parason
- Reido

== See also ==
- Music of Belarus
