= Astroworld Festival =

Annual music festival held in Houston, Texas

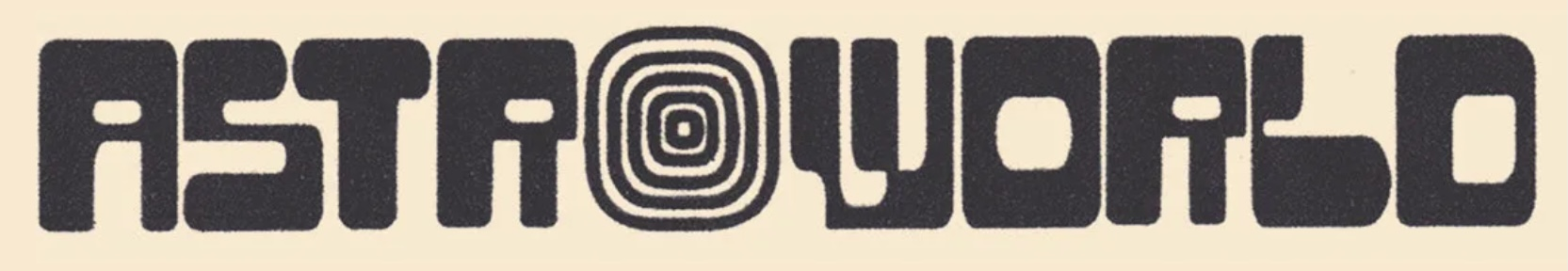
- Logo from the 2021 edition
- Genre: Music festival
- Frequency: Annually
- Locations: NRG Park; Houston, Texas, United States
- Years active: 2018, 2019, & 2021
- Inaugurated: November 17, 2018; 7 years ago
- Previous event: November 5, 2021
- Patrons: Live Nation Worldwide, Scoremore Holdings LLC
- Website: www.astroworldfest.com

Astroworld Festival was an annual music festival run by the American musician Travis Scott, held in Houston, Texas, at NRG Park, near the former site of Six Flags AstroWorld. It was first held in November 2018.

The 2020 festival was canceled due to the COVID-19 pandemic in Texas. Astroworld Festival 2021 was originally scheduled for November 5–6, 2021. On the first night, a crowd crush occurred, resulting in the deaths of ten people. The second night of the festival was canceled. All ten victims were ruled to have died from compression asphyxia. This mass casualty event put pressure on venues, security teams, ticket promoters and performers to ensure better safety for concertgoers. Many celebrities and performers sent their condolences to the victims, their families, and all who were affected. Criticism was raised over Scott's past recklessness when performing, and the festival negatively affected his career.

== History ==
The festival was launched in 2018, the same year that Scott released his album of the same name. A press release described the festival as aiming to “bring back the beloved spirit and nostalgia of AstroWorld, making a childhood dream of Travis’ come true.” The original lineup featured hip-hop artists such as Young Thug, Post Malone, Metro Boomin and Scott. Performances alternated between two stages called "Thrills" and "Chills"; the "Chills" stage was the larger of the two. The making of the festival and the album was the subject of the 2019 Netflix original film Look Mom I Can Fly.

The festival returned in 2019 with an expanded lineup. In addition to hip-hop artists, artists such as Rosalía and Marilyn Manson, who perform nuevo flamenco and hard rock respectively, added different genres to the festival. The festival's attendance was reported to have increased since the previous year, up to 50,000. Three people were injured when barricades placed outside the entrance collapsed as fans rushed to enter the festival.

The 2020 festival was canceled due to the COVID-19 pandemic in Texas, with a promised return in 2021. Scott partnered with Epic Games to produce a virtual event for the video game Fortnite Battle Royale entitled "Astronomical", which featured a 15-minute in-game presentation inspired by the Astroworld album and its visuals (including the premiere of Scott's new collaboration with Kid Cudi, "The Scotts"), and in-game challenges, skins, and cosmetic items inspired by Scott. The presentation premiered on April 23, with reruns for different time zones on April 24 and 25.

Tickets for the 2021 edition went on sale on May 5, 2021. The event had now expanded into a two-night festival on November 5 and 6, 2021. Ticket sales rose to 100,000, double the number sold in 2019. Despite a steep rise in ticket prices, the festival sold out in 30 minutes. A series of events known as "Astroweek" was held to lead into the festival, including celebrity softball and golf events in support of Scott's Cactus Jack Foundation, pop-up stores (including a sneaker collaboration with Nike), and the unveiling of a community garden at Young Elementary School, dedicated to Scott's grandmother (who joined Scott and other family members as part of its ribbon-cutting). Astroweek was to conclude on November 8 with a drive-in screening at the Moonstruck Drive-In Cinema of the film Red Rocket, featuring appearances by Scott as well as the film's writer, Sean Baker, and cast. The drive-in screening was canceled due to the crowd crush event.

== 2021 crowd crush ==
On the night of November 5, about 50,000 people attended the sold-out festival. Eight people were killed in a crowd crush, and 11 others went into cardiac arrest, according to Harris County and Houston city officials. At least two more people died later from injuries sustained during the event, bringing the death toll to ten. The Harris County medical examiner's office said all ten deaths were due to compression asphyxia. At around 2 p.m. that day, attendees had rushed an entrance to the grounds, knocking down security barricades and trampling other concert-goers. Houston Police Chief Troy Finner warned Scott of potential danger in a private meeting prior to the night's performance. The crush began around 9:15 p.m., during Scott's performance, and was declared a mass casualty event by 9:38 p.m. More than 300 people were treated for injuries related to the crush. Despite the presence of ambulances in the crowd, which was noticed by Scott, the performance continued for over thirty minutes past the time that the mass casualty event was declared, with Scott's performance ending around 10:15 p.m. The second night of the concert, to be held on November 6, was canceled.

=== Response from Travis Scott ===
The morning after the deadly performance, Scott released his initial statement. This statement was posted on Twitter and reads: "I'm absolutely devastated by what took place last night. My prayers go out to the families and all those impacted by what happened at Astroworld Festival. Houston PD has my total support as they continue to look into the tragic loss of life. I am committed to working together with the Houston community to heal and support the families in need. Thank you to Houston PD, Fire Department and NRG Park for their immediate response and support. Love You All." Nearly a month after the deadly crowd rush, Scott was interviewed by Charlamagne tha God, and the video was posted on YouTube on December 9, 2021. During the 50-minute interview, Scott displayed emotion, claiming he was on an "emotional rollercoaster". In the interview, Charlamagne asked who was responsible for the safety of the concert-goers; Scott replied "professionals". Scott described his timeline of the disaster, saying that he was not aware of the deaths until minutes before the press conference. He added that he had not heard any distress from the crowd, which would have caused him to stop the show. Scott told Charlamagne that he stopped his performance more than once to ensure that his attendees were OK. He offered to cover the funeral costs for all 10 of the victims. According to attorneys of the families, at least seven of the victims' families rejected his offer. Travis Scott's legal team said the offer to pay for funeral costs would not have any impact on the lawsuits against Scott that were filed by the families.

Travis Scott's girlfriend at the time, Kylie Jenner, was in attendance with her sister Kendall Jenner and daughter Stormi Webster. Jenner posted an Instagram story sharing her sympathy with the victims and their families, writing: "Travis and I are broken and devastated. My thoughts and prayers are with all who lost their lives, were injured or affected in any way by yesterday's events." During the performance, Jenner had posted several videos on Instagram in which an ambulance could be seen while Scott was performing. In her statement she claimed that neither she nor Scott had been "aware of any fatalities until the news came out after the show and in no world would have continued filming or performing".

=== Aftermath ===
Travis Scott was scheduled to be a headliner at Coachella 2022, but the festival pulled his spot after Astroworld. In 2021 Scott released Cacti, an agave spiked seltzer, which has stopped all production after Astroworld to focus on the victims and aftermath of the mass casualty. In addition, his partnership with Fortnite was delayed as they pulled all Scott's emotes from the game.

There have been around 300 lawsuits filed after Astroworld. The majority of these lawsuits filed have been directed towards Scott, Live Nation, promoters, the venue, and the many security companies. Scott has released a new project called Project HEAL. The project is broken down into four categories: "a Waymon Webster HBCU scholarship, an expansion of the CACT.US Youth Design Center, free mental health resources, and a U.S. Conference of Mayors Task Force of Event Safety". Project HEAL is funded by Scott himself, a multi-million dollar promise towards the project as well as a portion of his proceeds from his product launches. From Scotts HEAL website, the project will "bring together all of the relevant stakeholders from government, public safety, emergency response, health care, event management, music, and technology. It will be the first time all of these groups and individuals will work together to most effectively address the safety challenges faced by future large-scale events."

=== Previous incidents ===
Scott has been accused of reckless behavior during previous concerts. While performing at Lollapalooza in 2015, Scott encouraged fans to climb over security rails to get onto the stage. Following that incident, Scott pleaded guilty to reckless conduct charges. In 2017, a fan of Scott sued him after a performance in Manhattan. The fan described being pushed from a third-story balcony, then dragged onto stage with Scott. This resulted in the fan becoming paralyzed. In 2019, at Astroworld, 3 people were hospitalized due to being trampled by the crowd.

== Lineups ==
=== 2018 ===
In order of performance. Performances started on the Chills stage and alternated between it and the Thrills stage.

- Tommy Genesis
- Smokepurpp
- Virgil Abloh
- Trippie Redd
- Metro Boomin
- Sheck Wes
- Houston All-Stars
- Gunna
- Young Thug
- Rae Sremmurd
- Post Malone
- Lil Wayne
- Travis Scott

=== 2019 ===
In order of performance. Performances started on the Thrills stage and alternated between it and the Chills stage.

- Tay Keith
- Don Toliver
- Pop Smoke
- Sheck Wes
- Young Dolph + Key Glock
- Houston All Stars
- Megan Thee Stallion
- DaBaby
- Gucci Mane
- Playboi Carti
- Young Thug
- Migos
- Marilyn Manson
- Pharrell
- Rosalía
- Travis Scott
- Kanye West (unannounced performance during Travis Scott's set)

=== 2021 ===
November 5

All performances occurred at the Thrills stage with the exception of Scott and Drake's combined performance.

- Metro Boomin
- Master P
- Yves Tumor
- Toro y Moi
- Don Toliver
- Roddy Ricch
- Lil Baby
- SZA
- Travis Scott
- Drake (unannounced performance with Travis Scott)

November 6

All November 6 performances were canceled. The following artists had been scheduled to perform:

- Teezo Touchdown
- SoFaygo
- Maxo Kream + Houston All Stars
- Sheck Wes
- BIA
- Chief Keef
- Earth, Wind & Fire
- Baby Keem
- 21 Savage
- Bad Bunny
- Tame Impala
- Young Thug + YSL
