= Carlos Brito (musician) =

Ecuadorian composer and pianist

Carlos Enrique Brito Benavides

Carlos Enrique Brito Benavides (12 November 1891 – 2 February 1943) was an Ecuadorian composer and pianist.

== Biography ==
The son of musician Manuel Brito Cruz, he gained his early knowledge of music from his father and subsequently received private lessons with pianist and composer Sixto María Durán Cárdenas.

He later joined the bands No. 3 Regiment Calderón, then the No. 1 Vencedores Battalion and these bands toured much of Ecuador.

In Guayaquil in 1929, Brito Benavides won a prize in a contest with his group.

He died in Quito, aged 51.

== See also ==
- List of Ecuadorian musicians
