= List of bands from Delhi =

This is a list of musical ensembles from the Indian metropolitan area of Delhi.

- Bloodywood - Nu Metal band
- Euphoria – rock band
- Indian Ocean – rock band
- Menwhopause – rock band
- Musafir – rock band
- Parikrama – rock-and-roll band
- Them Clones – rock band

== See also ==
- Lists of musicians
- Music of India
