= Arturo Rodas =

Ecuadorian-born French-citizen composer

- Born: Ecuador
- Citizenship: Ecuador, France
- Education: École Normale de Musique de Paris
- Occupations: Composer and University Professor
- Writing career
- Genre: Opera

Arturo Rodas (born 3 March 1954, in Quito) is an Ecuadorian-born French-citizen composer.

== Biography ==
Rodas studied at the National Conservatory in Quito, took private composition lessons with Gerardo Guevara, and also graduated in Law at the Universidad Central del Ecuador. Between 1978 and 1980 he was assistant to the French composer José Berghmans in Quito and Paris. He studied at the École Normale de Musique de Paris from 1979-84. There he graduated in counterpoint (Ginette Keller's class) and composition with Yoshihisa Taira as his mentor. In 1983 he attended a composition course with Luciano Berio. He also studied electroacoustic music with Mesias Maiguashca (CERM in Metz) and with Phil Wachsmann in London. He has attended short courses at the IRCAM in Paris. While in París he also attended courses given in several institutions by Michèle Reverdy, Pierre Boulez, Gerard Grisey, Guy Reibel and Iannis Xenakis.

He returned to Ecuador in 1984 where some of his orchestral works were performed by the National Symphony Orchestra conducted by Alvaro Manzano. In Ecuador he became one of the three "notable composers of the following generations". The Banco Central del Ecuador issued a two-disk recording of Rodas works in 1988 as volume one of the series Compositores ecuatorianos contemporáneos. Included are Fibris, along with Arcaica, Clímax, Andino III, iOh. ...!, Mordente, Espacios Invertidos".

"Arturo Rodas championed a contemporary, universal musical style within his country. A number of his works from this period, such as his aleatoric orchestral piece Fibris (1986), were published in Opus, a music magazine that Rodas co-edited. Since emigrating to England in 1990, he has composed works such as The Book of the Orchestra (2002-2003) which is intended to be performed in a house with many rooms so as to allow an “audience” to hear different instrumental groups as they wander from room to room". He has travelled back to Ecuador for concert and teaching activities. He has also worked as a music critic, editor and concert organiser. Rodas's works are published by Periferia Music (Barcelona) and Virtualscore (Paris).

Patterns: personal vision of his sources (Andino I-Andino IV, Laúdico); sound-mass polyphony (Entropía, Arcaica); aleatorism (Fibris, Ramificaciones Temporales); formal research (Obsesiva, La, Melodías de Cámara); and unavoidably the meeting point of patterns ("24.5 Preludios for piano", the "Atonal Fugues" and the opera "El Árbol de los Pájaros"). In that work the plot stems from the interaction music - architecture.

Audio: Piece of Cake Suite in 4 movements, for piano & cd. Pianist: Francis Yang

== Works ==
Year	Work	Description	Information	Duration
1981	Entropía, for orchestra	orchestral		
1983	Andino III, for flute	solo (flute)		
1984	Arcaica, concerto for percussion & orchestra	orchestral		
1984	Mordente, for clarinet quartet	instrumental		
1985	Clímax, for orchestra	orchestral		
1985	Espacios Invertidos, for percussion	solo (percussion)		
1985	Ramificaciones Temporales, for clarinet & visual arts: solo music made for the Coloritura (colour & score) by the painter Ana Placencia	solo (multimedia)		
1985	Güilli Gu, for orchestra & visual arts: orchestral music made for the second coloritura	orchestral (multimedia)		
1986	Fibris, for orchestra	orchestral		
1986	¡ Oh !, for trumpet	solo (trumpet)		
1987	Melodías de Cámara, for chamber orchestra	orchestral (chamber)		
1987	¡ Oh !, for piano	solo (piano)		
1987	Obstinado, for violoncelle	solo (violoncelle)		
1987	Obsesiva, for narrator, electroacoustics & orchestra	orchestral (electroacoustic)		
1987	Introitus, for choir & orchestra	orchestral (choral)		
1988	Kyrie, for soloists, choir & orchestra	orchestral (choral)		
1988	La, for choir & orchestra	orchestral (choral)		
1989	A, B, C, D, for string quartet	instrumental		
1990	Había una vez, for Chamber orchestra and choir	orchestral (choral)		
1991	Andante, for saxophone piano & percussion	instrumental		
1992	Obstinado II, for violoncelle	solo (violoncelle)		
1992	Espacios invertidos II, for percussion	solo (percussion)		
1992	Andino IV, for flute	solo (flute)		
1993	Mordente II, for clarinet quartet	instrumental		
1996	Lieder, for percussion	solo (percussion)		
1997	Full Moon Business, for chamber orchestra	orchestral (chamber)		
1999	24.5 Preludes, for piano	solo (piano)		
2001	Bailecito, for tape	electroacoustic		
2001	Fermez les yeux svp, for tape	electroacoustic		
2001	El llanto del disco duro, for tape	electroacoustic		
2002	Buñuelos, for trumpet	solo (trumpet)		
2002	Mandolínico, for mandoline	solo (mandoline)		
2002	Laúdico, for lute	solo (lute)		
2002	Laúdico, transcription for guitar	solo (guitar)		
2002	Mandolínico, transcription for guitar	solo (guitar)		
2002	Ta-i-a-o-a, for soprano	vocal		
2003	El Árbol de los Pájaros, opera for the voice of the instruments	instrumental (multimedia)		
2003	Il était une fois ..., for choir a cappella	vocal		
2003	sol-fa-mi-ré-é-do-o-la-a, for choir a cappella	vocal		
2004	Piece of Cake, for piano & tape	instrumental (electroacoustic)		
2004	Fermez les yeux svp, for tape & film: (film by Rupert Davies-Cooke)	electroacoustic (multimedia)		
2005	Life Class 2005, 4 pieces dor for piano, tape & film: (films by Rupert Davies-Cooke)	instrumental (multimedia)		
2005	Organillo, for organ	solo (organ)		
2007	The Walk, for pre-recorded soprano, tape & film: (film by Rupert Davies-Cooke)	vocal (multimedia)		
2007	Anónimo, for winds quartet	instrumental		
2007	Reflejos en la Noche, for piano.	solo (piano)		
2007	Papeleo sin fin, for contratenor	vocal		
2008	Ricercare, for 3 percussions	instrumental		
2008	Fuga Atonal I, for oboe d'amore & piano	instrumental (duo)		
2008	Fuga Atonal I, transcription for oboe and piano.	instrumental (duo)		
2008	Fuga Atonal II, for string quartet	instrumental		

=== Writings ===
- Rodas, Arturo. Análisis de la forma musical de Güilli Gu. Cultura magazine, Central Bank of Ecuador, vol IX no.26. Edited by Irving Iván Zapater, September/December 1986: pp 387-402.
- Rodas, Arturo. La hora de Mesías Maiguashca, Opus Magazine No. 15, September 1987: pp 17-19.
- Rodas, Arturo. Gerardo Guevara en la encrucijada musical, Opus Magazine No. 15, September 1987: pp 20-21. Re-printed from magazine Impulso 2000, November 1987.
- Luis H. Salgado. Opus Magazine, No. 31 (monographic), edited by Arturo Rodas. Central Bank of Ecuador, January 1989.

== Scholarships and awards ==
- 1980-84 French Government scholarship.
- 1983 International contest for orchestral composition Max Deutsch, Paris.
- 1983 Centre Acanthes scholarship to study with Luciano Berio in Aix-en-Provence, France.
- 1983-84 École Normale de Musique scholarship.
- 1989-90 Grant from the UNESCO to write music.

== Discography ==
Year	Work	Performers	Record
1986	Güilli Gu, for orchestra	OSN (National Symphony Orchestra of Ecuador) conducted by Álvaro Manzano	Famoso (record No. 3200027), Ecuador
1987	Arcaica, for percussion & orchestra. Other works by: M. Estévez, G. Guevara, D. Luzuriaga & M. Maiguashca	OSN conducted by Álvaro Manzano	Ifesa (LP 301-0293), Ecuador
1988	Arcaica, for percussion & orchestra	OSN conducted by Álvaro Manzano	Ifesa (LP-388-0408)
1988	Clímax, for orchestra	OSN conducted by Alvaro Manzano	Ifesa (LP-388-0408)
1988	Mordente, for clarinets quartet	Miguel Jimenez	Ifesa (LP 338-0409)
1988	Fibris, for orchestra	OSN conducted by Álvaro Manzano	Ifesa (LP-388-0408)
1988	Espacios Invertidos, for percussion	Pablo Valarezo, percussion	Ifesa (LP 338-0409)
1988	Andino III, for flute	Luciano Carrera, flute	Ifesa (LP 338-0409)
1988	¡ Oh ... !, for piano	Christo Iliev, piano	Ifesa (LP 338-0409)
2008	Anónimo, for Flute, English horn, Clarinet & Violoncello. Other works by: M. Maiguashca, J. Campoverde, P. Freire, L. Enríquez, E. Flores-Abad & M. Estévez	Ensemble SurPlus, Freiburg/Germany, conducted by James Avery	Sumak, CD. Edition: C.C.E.N. del Azuay ** and International Biennial of Painting, Cuenca
2008	Pan Comido (Piece of Cake), suite for piano & tape, (1st. y 2nd. movements)	Francis Yang, piano	Redasla, CD code 3447972495), Mexico

== Sources ==
- Béhague, Gerard. 2001. "Ecuador. Art Music". The New Grove Dictionary of Music and Musicians, second edition, edited by Stanley Sadie and John Tyrrell. London: Macmillan Publishers; New York: Grove's Dictionaries of Music.
- Campos, Jorge. 2008, note for Periferia Music, Barcelona.
- Enciclopedia de la música ecuatoriana. Corporación Musicológica Ecuatoriana (CONMUSICA). Edited by Pablo Guerrero Gutierrez. Quito, 2003.
- Walker, John L. 2001. "The Younger Generation of Ecuadorian Composers". Latin American Music Review 22, no. 2 (Fall/Winter): 199–213.
- Walker, John L. 2007. "Singing in a Foreign Land: National Identity and Proximity in Ecuadorian Music". Paper presented at the 2007 Congress of the Latin American Studies Association, Montréal, Canada, September 5–7.
