= List of royal musicians =

Members of royal families have shown talent in playing musical instruments, singing, or composing music, most often at a gifted amateur level, and on rare occasions having popular hits in their own countries, or giving public performances during most often charities at home, or royal visits abroad. At the same time, those who have been performers, have also been intimately interested in preserving and extending traditional court music and its musicians as patrons of the traditional music and arts of their own countries.

Perhaps the most famous musician in royal families has been Henry VIII of England cited by legend as composing the popular English folk song Greensleeves, as well as several other pieces of greater veracity.

The following is a preliminary list of the more famous members of world royal families with their musical instruments or skills. Citations in the bibliography may include streaming audio of royal compositions.

== List ==
- Austria: Archduke Rudolf of Austria, piano and composing
- Castile: Alfonso X of Castile, various songs
- Denmark: Frederik IX of Denmark, conducting
- Denmark: Henrik, Prince Consort of Denmark, piano
- England: Henry VIII, composer
- England: Elizabeth I, Harpsichordist
- England: Mary I, harpsichordist
- Prussia: Prince Louis Ferdinand of Prussia (1772–1806), composer and pianist
- Prussia: Frederick II of Prussia, composer
- Prussia: Princess Philippine Charlotte
- Hawaii: Liliuokalani, composer
- Hawaii: William Charles Lunalilo, lyric writer
- Japan, Crown Prince Naruhito, viola
- Korea, Prince Yi Seok, popular song
- Monaco, Princess Stéphanie of Monaco, popular song
- Portugal, John IV of Portugal, musician
- Sweden: Anni-Frid "Frida" Lyngstad aka Princess Anni-Frid Synni of Reuss, Countess of Plauen, member of the band ABBA
- Thailand, King Bhumibol Adulyadej, clarinet/saxophone
- UK: Charles III, cello
- UK: Queen Victoria, Organist
- UK: Prince Albert, Organist
- UK: Edward VII, banjoist (classic style)
- UK: Edward VIII, drummer (jazz)
