= Pathompong Sombatpiboon =

Thai rock singer and songwriter

Pathompong Sombatpiboon ปฐมพงศ์ สมบัติพิบูลย์
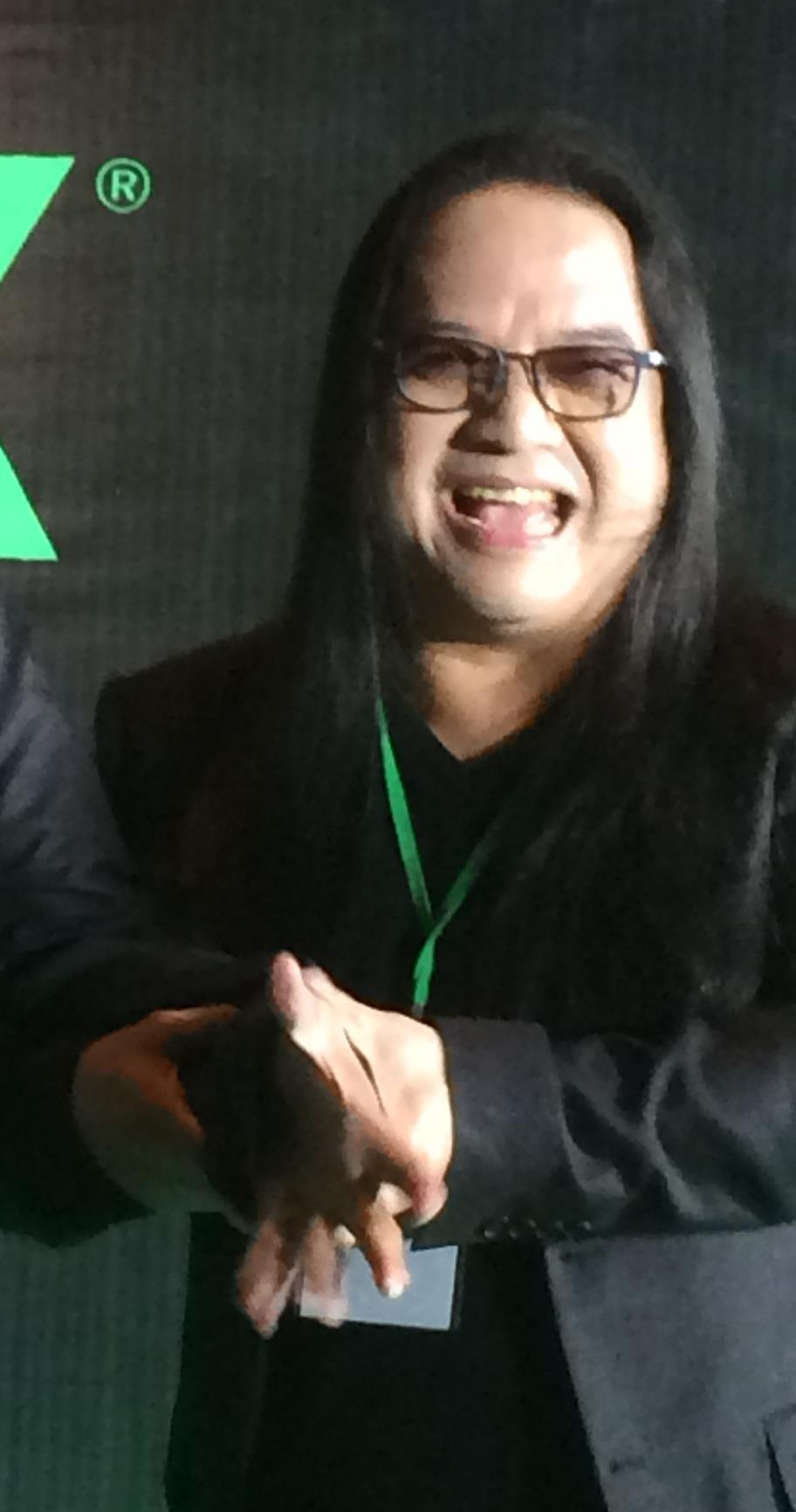
- Sombatpiboon in 2017

Background information
- Born: 9 October 1961 (age 64); Chumphon Province, Thailand
- Genres: Thai rock; heavy metal; glam metal; pop rock
- Occupations: Singer; songwriter
- Instrument: Vocals
- Years active: 1978–present
- Labels: GMM Grammy; Milestone; RS Promotion; Sony Music; Real and Sure
- Member of: Stone Metal Fire; the Sun
- Formerly of: Inferno; Soda

Pathompong "Pong" Sombatpiboon (Thai: "โป่ง"; ปฐมพงศ์ สมบัติพิบูลย์; born 9 October 1961) is a Thai rock singer and songwriter. He is the lead vocalist of the bands Stone Metal Fire and the Sun. He has been dubbed the "Thai Ozzy Osbourne".

== Early life and musical career ==
Pong was born in Chumphon Province on 9 October 1961, to a Thai Chinese family. He graduated from Ramkhamhaeng University, in Bangkok.

The first band in which he sang was named Inferno. In 1985, he sang with Soda, and two years later, when that group broke up, he formed the Olarn Project with several members of Soda. In 1991, he cofounded the rock band Stone Metal Fire, which released two albums, before splitting up in 1995. Pong then formed another rock band, the Sun.

== Personal life ==
Pong is married to Chariya Sombatphiboon, and they have a daughter, Thiticha "Angie" Sombatphiboon, who is also a singer.

== Discography ==
=== Solo ===
- The Game (2002)
- Sexperience (2003)

=== with the Olarn Project ===
- February 1985 (1987)
- Hoo Lek (1989)

=== with Stone Metal Fire ===
- หิน เหล็ก ไฟ (1993)
- ร็อกเพื่อนกัน (compilation, 1993)
- คนยุคเหล็ก (1995)
- Never Say Die (2005)
- Acoustique (live album, 2006)

=== with the Sun ===
- The Sun (1996)
- Tiger, Lion, Bull, Rhino (1998)
- The Road of the Sun (2000)
