= Tony Miceli =

American jazz vibraphonist (born 1960)

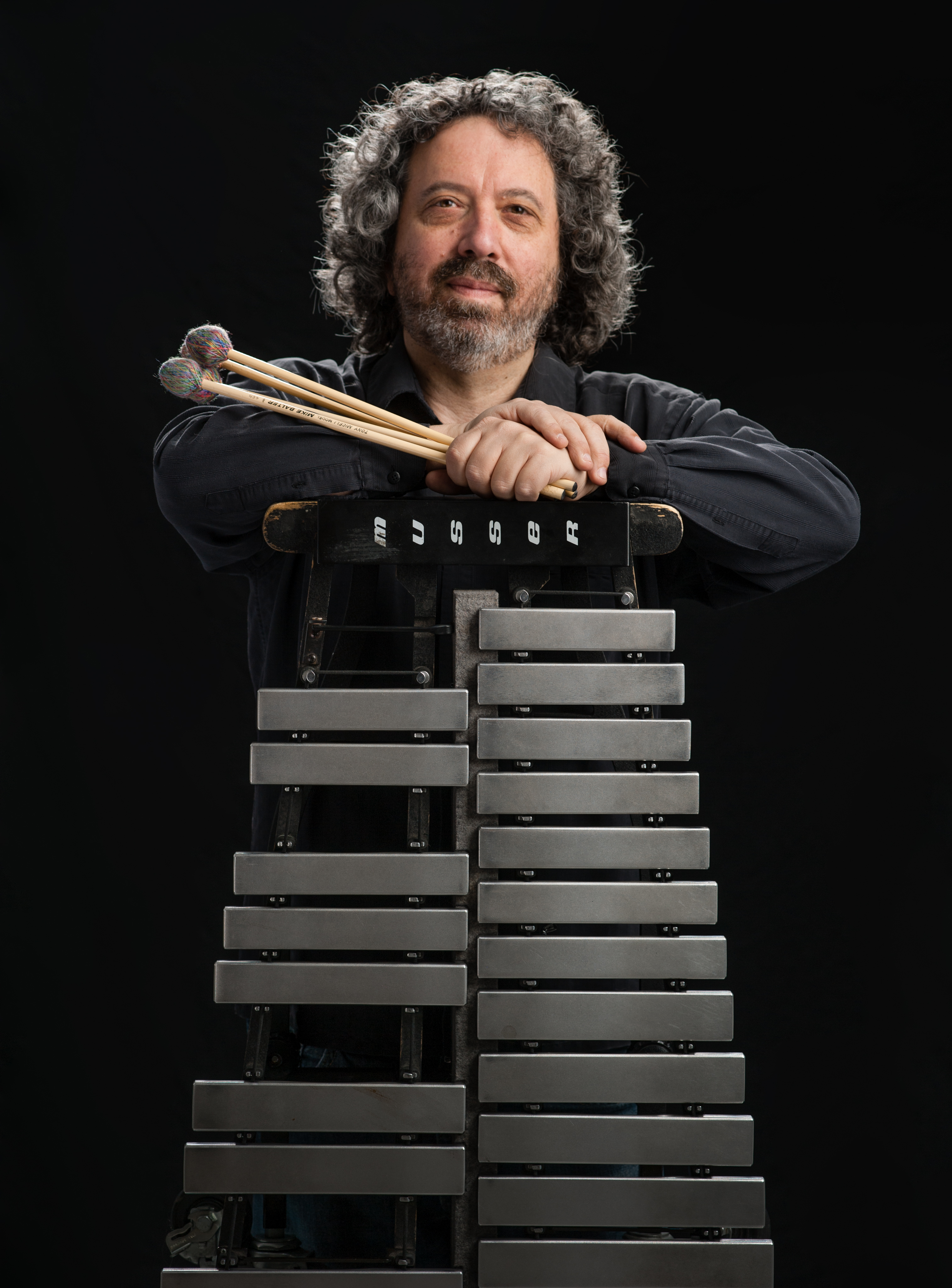
- Tony Miceli and Vibraphone

Background information
- Born: July 1, 1960 (age 65); Cincinnati, Ohio, U.S.
- Genres: Jazz
- Occupations: Musician, composer, educator
- Instruments: Vibraphone, marimba
- Years active: 1976-present
- Website: www.tonymiceli.com

Tony Miceli (born July 1, 1960) is an American jazz vibraphonist and educator. He was born in Cincinnati, Ohio, and grew up in Willingboro, New Jersey.

He is on the faculty of the University of the Arts, Temple University and University of Southern Mississippi. He also performs in jazz clubs, concert halls and festivals around the world. He has played jazz standards, jazz interpretations of classical music (a repertoire that includes Villa Lobos, Mozart, and Bach) Led Zeppelin, Jimi Hendrix, and other rock musicians from the 1960s.

Miceli has worked with David Friedman, Joe Magnarelli, Dave Liebman, Elio Villafranca, Steve Slagle, Dave Stryker, Peter Bernstein, Gerald Veasley, and Joanna Pascale.

Miceli has performed at the Degu Jazz Festival (Korea), Reading Jazz Festival, the Kimmel Center for the Performing Arts, the Jazz Standard, the Zinc Bar, 55 Bar, the Wexford Art Center (Ireland), and the Mallet Institute (Düsseldorf Germany). He is the creator and moderator of the Vibraphone Community website.

== Early life and education ==
Miceli was born in Cincinnati in 1960 and grew up in Willingboro Township, New Jersey. He began to play classical guitar in his youth before later turning to piano, trumpet and drums. He began playing vibraphone in 1978 as a student the University of the Arts. After graduating with a bachelor's degree in performance in 1982, he began a career that included composing, recording, teaching, and performing.

== Career ==
In the 1980s and early-1990s, Miceli toured extensively through Germany with the percussion group “Mallet Madness”. Featuring Miceli on vibraphone with Ron Von Strattun (drums), Bernd Zinzius (Bass) and Christoph Eidens (vibes and marimba), Mallet Madness played jazz versions of rock songs, in a trio reminiscent of the guitar trios of the 60's, with vibraphone replacing guitar as the feature instrument. The group played clubs and festivals throughout Continental Europe including Schlag, Wekstatt, Jazz Fruhling, Deutsches Percussion, Symposium, Stadtgarten Restaurant, Rundfunk, K14, Blue Stage, Mulheimer Jazz Club, and the Essen Jazz Festival.

In 1995, Miceli started "The Rock Band" with bassist Kevin MacConnell and Drummer Harry "Butch" Reed. A result of Miceli's early Rock Music influences, the group covered several British Invasion bands including The Beatles, Pink Floyd, Led Zeppelin, The Kinks, and Jimi Hendrix. This group ultimately became "The Jōst Project" when vocalist Paul Jost was added to the lineup in the 2000s.

In the late 1990s, Miceli created the Philadelphia-based group Monkadelphia, a group "dedicated to performing the music of Thelonious Monk in an innovative, contemporary way." Playing Monk's work, along, with Chris Farr on saxophone, Tom Lawton on piano, Micah Jones on bass, and Jim Miller on drums, was a "difficult challenge which they embrace with vitality, panache, and sophistication." The group recorded a selection of 11 tracks called simply "Monkadelphia" in 2000 (Dreambox Media).

In 2009, Miceli's group Monkadelphia released Crepuscle, a follow-up to Monkadelphia.

Miceli has performed at several jazz festivals and clubs, including the Hilton Head Island Jazz Vibes Showcase in 2019 with Team Omega; the Daegu Festival in Daegu; the International Percussion Festival in Lima; the Limerick Jazz Festival in Ireland; and the Montreal International Jazz Festival. He has also played at the Jazz Bridge Concert Series, Peace Day Kickoff, Rhythm Festival, Please Touch Museum Jazz Festival, Longwood Gardens Festivals, Exit Zero Jazz Festival, Somers Point Jazz Festival, Rehoboth Beach Festival, and Vail Jazz Festival.

As a group leader, sideman, and recording artist, he has performed with David Liebman, Jimmy Bruno, Ken Peplowski, John Blake, Diane Monroe, John Swana, Joe Magnarelli, Steve Slagle, Larry McKenna, Gerald Veasley and others. He makes regular appearances at Chris's Jazz Café and performs annually at the Percussive Arts Society convention in Indianapolis.

== Discography ==
=== As leader ===
- Thelonious 4 Meets Tony Miceli (Dot Time, 2013)
- Alone Together with Diane Monroe (2014)
- 4,042 Miles (Audio & Video Labs, 2015)

As member

- Monkadelphia, Monkadelphia (Dreambox Media, 2000)
- Crepuscule, Monkadelphia (Dreambox, 2010)
- Can't Find My Way Home, The Jōst Project (Dot Time, 2013)
- Looking East, The Philly 5 (2003)
- On a Sweet Note, Electric Mingus Project (2003)

=== As guest ===
- Band Shapes, Olivier Hutman (2002)
- 'Round in Circles, Ron Kerber (Dreambox, 2004)
- Excerpt This!, Adam Unsworth (2006)
- So in Love with You, Rosie Carlino (2006)
- Places, Mark Knox (2007)
- Maplewood Avenue, Jimmy Bruno (2007)
- Once Upon a Time, Katie Eagleson (2007)
- Medicine Man, Tom Tallitsch (2008)
- Thankfully, Gina Roche (2011)

== See also ==
- Vibraphone
- List of vibraphonists
