= The Sun (Thai rock band) =

- Origin: Bangkok, Thailand
- Genres: Heavy metal; glam metal; pop rock; alternative rock
- Years active: 1996–2000, 2019–present
- Labels: RS Promotion; Bakery Music; Sony Music; Real and Sure
- Spinoff of: Stone Metal Fire
- Members: Pathompong Sombatpiboon; Jakkarin Daungmaneerattanachai; Phithak Srisang; Damrongsith Srinak
- Past members: Selvester Lester C. Esteban

The Sun (Thai: เดอะซัน) is a Thai heavy metal and alternative rock band whose popularity peaked between 1996 and 1998. It was formed by two members of the rock band Stone Metal Fire in 1996 and has since released three studio albums.

== History ==
In 1996, a year after the rock band Stone Metal Fire split up, two of its members—vocalist Pathompong "Pong" Sombatpiboon and guitarist Jakkarin "Pop" Daungmaneerattanachai, formed the Sun. They were joined by Filipino drummer Selvester Lester C. Esteban and finally added bassist Phithak Srisang, who had played with Sombatpiboon in the Olarn Project.

The band released their self-titled debut album the same year they formed, through RS Promotion. They followed it with เสือ สิงห์ กระทิง แรด two years later. In 2000, the Sun issued their third studio album, ถนนพระอาทิตย์, this time on Bakery Music.

== Band members ==
Current

- Pathompong "Pong" Sombatpiboon (ปฐมพงษ์ สมบัติพิบูลย์) – vocals
- Jakkarin "Pop" Daungmaneerattanachai (จักรรินทร์ ดวงมณีรัตนชัย) – guitar
- Phitak Srisang (พิทักษ์ ศรีสังข์) – bass
- Damrongsith "Pingpong" Srinak (ดำรงสิทธิ์ ศรีนาค) – drums

Past

- Selvester Lester C. Esteban – drums (1996–2000)

== Discography ==
- The Sun (1996)
- เสือ สิงห์ กระทิง แรด (1998)
- ถนนพระอาทิตย์ (2000)
