= Olga Gutiérrez =

- Born: Olga Gutiérrez Iraolagoite; 1928; Quimilí, Argentina
- Died: March 10, 2015 (aged 86–87); Guayaquil, Ecuador
- Occupation: Singer
- Spouse: Kiko González (m. 1976–2015)
- Musical career
- Genres: Pasillo

Olga Gutiérrez Iraolagoite (1928 – March 10, 2015) was an Argentine-Ecuadorian pasillo singer.

== Early years ==
Olga Gutiérrez was born in Quimilí, Santiago del Estero, Argentina in 1928. Her father was a rancher. Since she was little she had a relationship with singing, as her grandfather and uncles used to sing and play musical instruments on weekends. She was two years old when she climbed onto a stage to sing in her hometown for the first time.

== Career ==
At 18, Gutiérrez began to sing professionally, performing at a cafe for two weeks, then traveling to Brazil and later to Venezuela, touring several countries in South America giving concerts. She arrived in Ecuador in 1962, hired by the government of Carlos Julio Arosemena Monroy, where she sang in honor of Prince Philip, husband of Queen Elizabeth II. However she was interested in traveling to Mexico to make movies with Tony Aguilar. She became friends with the trio Los Latinos del Andes, made up of Eduardo Erazo, Héctor Jaramillo, and Homero Hidrovo.

She recorded with the Managua Symphony Orchestra, then traveled to Panama after Eduardo Erazo told her that he was working for free with Los Latinos del Andes, and took them to Managua where they recorded their songs. Then she took them to Mexico where they formed the group Los Brillantes, worked for 1 year, and then toured Venezuela and Panama. She remained with the group during the 1960s and 70s, with performances in New York, Bogotá, Mexico City, and San José, Costa Rica. They recorded several albums, with songs like "Horas de pasión", "Te digo corazón", "Esta pena mía", and "Vasija de barro". Later Gutiérrez returned to Ecuador as a soloist, and with the help of Ernesto Albán, held concerts in various towns in the country. She became a nationalized Ecuadorian in 2004, due to her permanence as a resident in the country and her enjoyment of working together with Albán and the national musical form (pasillo). She also formed a duo with Kiko González called Olga and Kiko, touring in the United States and Europe.

In 1966 she represented Ecuador at the Festival of Music and Song, in Hollywood, where she won the Palma de Mallorca.

== Personal life ==
She had a relationship with Héctor Jaramillo and was married to Kiko González for 39 years.

== Death ==
In 2003, she was diagnosed with diabetes, and due to this, her right leg was amputated in 2008. In 2005, she was named National Music Ambassador and awarded the Rosa Campuzano prize. On October 14, 2010, she was named Ecuadorian Pasillo Queen by the cultural group Los Trovadores. In 2011 she appeared with Juan Fernando Velasco, where he played her song "Acuérdate de mi". Olga Gutiérrez died on March 10, 2015, at the Hospital del Seguro in Guayaquil, due to pulmonary edema and bronchopneumonia, complications caused by the diabetes she had had for more than a decade.
