= List of vibraphonists =

The following is a list of notable vibraphone players in jazz or classical music:

== A ==
- Jason Adasiewicz
- Peter Appleyard
- Mulatu Astatke
- Vera Auer
- Roy Ayers

== B ==
- Gregg Bendian
- Karl Berger
- Øyvind Brandtsegg
- Alan Branscombe
- Patricia Brennan
- Jack Brokensha
- Larry Bunker
- Gary Burton

== C ==
- Mike Carr
- Bryan Carrott
- Joe Chambers
- Teddy Charles
- Warren Chiasson
- John Cocuzzi
- Tom Collier
- Paolo Conte
- Eddie Costa
- Tony Crombie

== D ==
- Manu Dibango
- Walt Dickerson
- Mike Dillon
- Toby Driver

== E ==
- Don Elliott
- Lars Erstrand

== F ==
- Victor Feldman
- Brent Fischer
- Mike Freeman
- David Friedman

== G ==
- Terry Gibbs
- Tyree Glenn
- Evelyn Glennie
- Tommy Gwaltney

== H ==
- Ollie Halsall
- Dave Hamilton
- Gunter Hampel
- Lionel Hampton
- Hagood Hardy
- Bob Harrington
- Stefon Harris
- Jim Hart
- Michel Hausser
- Tubby Hayes
- Jay Hoggard
- Hans Hulbækmo
- Bobby Hutcherson
- Margie Hyams

== J ==
- Milt Jackson
- Moe Jaffe
- Khan Jamal

== K ==
- Anthony Kerr
- Ivar Kolve
- Kathy Kelly

== L ==
- Frits Landesbergen
- Bill Le Sage
- Bob Leatherbarrow
- Alan Lee
- Ulf Linde
- Buzzy Linhart
- Joe Locke
- Matthias Lupri
- Arthur Lyman
- Johnny Lytle

== M ==
- Mike Mainieri
- Jason Marsalis
- George Masso
- Dan McCarthy
- Freddie McCoy
- Gary McFarland
- Tony Miceli
- Jerzy Milian
- Max Miller
- Vincent Montana Jr.
- Buddy Montgomery
- Coati Mundi

== N ==
- Bobby Naughton
- Steve Nelson
- Kevin Norton
- Red Norvo

== P ==
- Cale Parks
- Bobby Paunetto
- Dave Pike
- Werner Pirchner
- Paul Plimley
- Terry Pollard
- Tommy Pollard
- Jože Privšek
- Tito Puente

== R ==
- Johnny Rae
- Christos Rafalides
- Gene Rains
- Louie Ramirez
- Chuck Redd
- Emil Richards
- Frank Ricotti
- Orphy Robinson
- Joe Roland
- Adrian Rollini
- Jorge Rossy
- Hal Russell

== S ==
- Fats Sadi
- Dave Samuels
- John Sangster
- Pascal Schumacher
- Harry Sheppard
- Mark Sherman
- Charlie Shoemake

== T ==
- Jerry Tachoir
- Eldad Tarmu
- Don Thompson
- Cal Tjader

== U ==
- Ruth Underwood

== V ==
- Tommy Vig

== W ==
- Luigi Waites
- Bill Ware
- Rob Waring
- Dinah Washington
- Julius Wechter
- James Westfall
- Lem Winchester
- Warren Wolf
- Kenny Wollesen

== Z ==
- Nancy Zeltsman
