= List of UK noise musicians =

The following is a list of notable UK noise musicians and bands.

- Hwyl Nofio
- Nurse With Wound
- Skullflower
- Throbbing Gristle
- Whitehouse
