= Pyti =

Pyti Alexey Nikitin
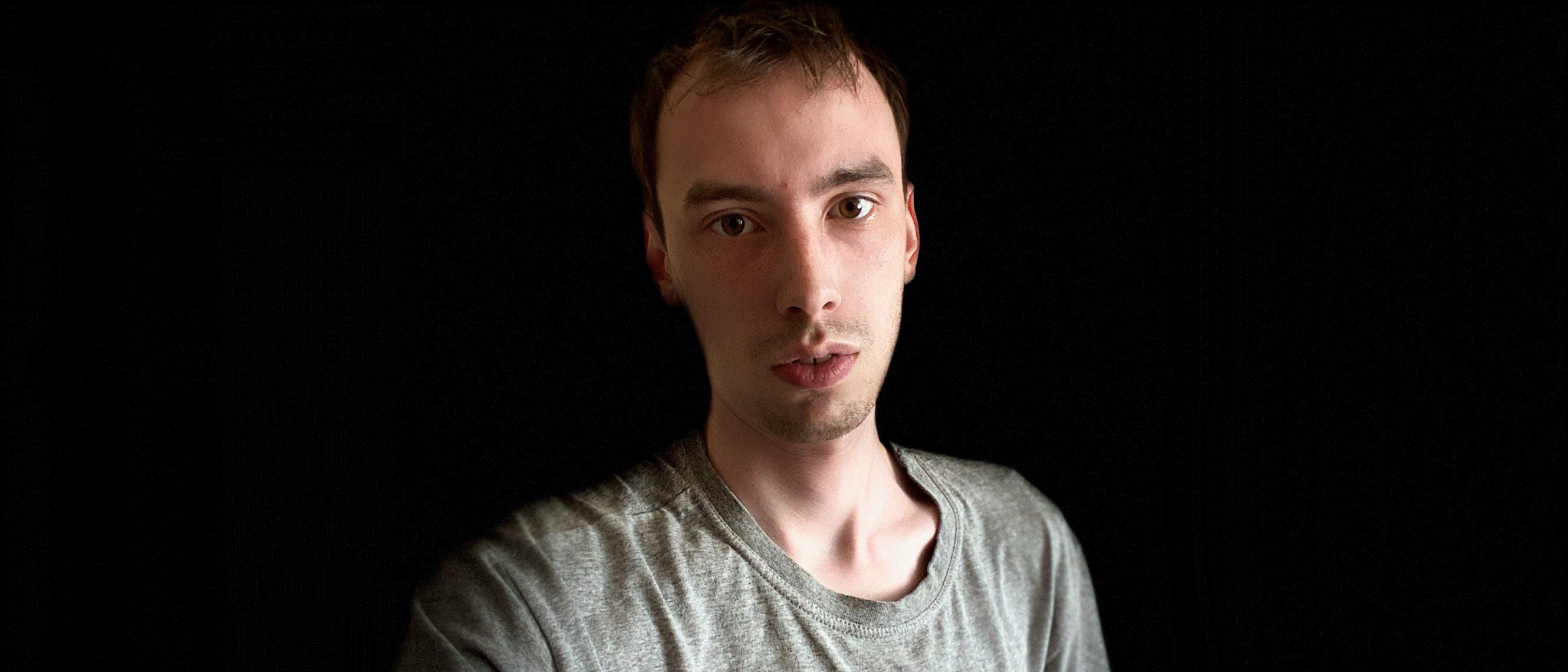

Background information
- Also known as: Pyti
- Genres: EDM, Electropop, Dubstep
- Instrument: accordion
- composer, producer

Alexey Nikitin, known professionally as Pyti, is a Belarusian musician, composer and producer.

== Biography ==
In 2009, he became a scholarship holder of the special fund of the President of the Republic of Belarus to support talented youth. Then he graduated from the Belarusian State Academy of Music in the class of accordion. He won several international and national competitions, for which he was awarded the Prize of the President of the Republic of Belarus. As a member of the L. L. Ivanov Folk Instruments Orchestra he has performed at a number of music festivals, including the State Kremlin Palace, the Moscow International House of Music, the Gnessin Russian Academy of Music and the Moscow State Conservatory. He is also a member of the Data Bank of Gifted Youth

In 2020, under the pseudonym Pyti, he began his career in the genre of electronic music, releasing his first single "Fire".

In 2021, he released five singles in various styles of electronic dance music, "Night Wish", "Get High", "Multiband", "Move On", and "Tell Me", which also launched his career as a music producer.

The compositions "Move On" and "Tell Me" were highly praised by foreign critics. As well as other tracks such as Focus, Fortuna, Sunswept, Sha Be Allah from The Source compared Pyti's work to artists such as AVICII, Juice WRLD, and Diplo

== Singles ==
- 2020 — «Fire»
- 2021 — «Night Wish»
- 2021 — «Get High»
- 2021 — «Multiband»
- 2021 — «Move On»
- 2021 — «Tell Me»
- 2022 — «Focus»
- 2023 — «Fortuna»
- 2023 — «Sunswept»
- 2024 — «I Wanna Dance»
