= Lila Álvarez Garcia =

Ecuadorian pianist

Lila Álvarez García
- Born: February 26, 1915; Quito, Ecuador
- Died: December 28, 1999 (aged 84)
- Scientific career
- Fields: Pianist, Choir director, Musical art teacher

Lila Álvarez Garcia (26 February 1915 – 28 December 1999) was an Ecuadorian pianist, choir director, and musical art teacher. Graduating from the National Conservatory of Music, she moved to Guayaquil to work and teach.

== Work ==
Álvarez García taught Theory and Piano at the Antonio Neumane National Conservatory of Music in Buenos Aires, and directed choral groups in local secondary schools. She was affiliated with several cultural and musical institutions in Ecuador, including the House of Ecuadorian Culture, the musical association Ángelo Negri of the core of Guayas, the Patronato Musical de Bellas Artes, and the National Union of Musicians in Guayaquil. She also served on the board of directors of the Symphony Orchestra of Guayaquil. In addition to her institutional roles, she ran a didactic programme on Channel 2 (Ecuavisa) and contributed writing to El Telégrafo and El Universo.
