= William Turk =

American ragtime pianist

William Turk (1866 – 1911) was an American ragtime pianist. He was reputably so obese that he could not put his left hand in front of his stomach, so he invented techniques playing with his left hand to the side.

Eubie Blake claimed to have heard Turk playing in 1896 in Baltimore, in a style then known as "sixteen", which Blake said was later renamed "boogie woogie". Blake also stated that Turk "had a left hand like God".
