= Apartment Khunpa =

Thai indie rock band

Apartment Khunpa (Thai: อพาร์ตเมนต์คุณป้า, lit. 'Auntie's Apartment') is a Thai indie rock band from Bangkok. Formed in 2002, its members include singer-songwriter Tul Waitoolkiat (Tul), guitarist Piyanart Jatikasathira (Pump), lead guitarist Gun Rujinarong (Ball), bassist Pukan Sansuriya (Mai) and drummer Tassarirk Limsila (Ja).

== Awards ==
- Best Group Artist - Kom Chud Leuk
- Best group – Fat Radio
- Album of the year 2003 – Fat Radio
- Album of the year 2005 – Fat Radio

== Discography ==
- Bangkok Love Story - 2003
- Romantic Comedy - 2006
- Somros Lae Para – 2008
- Bottom Up - 2015
- Loveism - 2016
