= List of lo-fi musicians =

This is a list of musicians whose body of work is tagged as "lo-fi". Individuals are sorted by surname.

== B ==
- Lou Barlow
- Beat Happening
- Beck
- Burner Herzog

== C ==
- Cavetown
- Car Seat Headrest
- The Chills
- Clairo

== G ==
- Alastair Galbraith
- Girl in Red
- Guided by Voices

== J ==
- Jandek
- Joji
- Daniel Johnston
- Simon Joyner

== K ==
- Chris Knox
- Keshi

== L ==
- Jasper Leach

== M ==
- R. Stevie Moore
- The Microphones
- Tony Molina
- The Mountain Goats
- MonoNeon
- mxmtoon

== N ==
- Nothing Painted Blue

== P ==
- Ariel Pink
- Part Time
- Pavement
- Pussy Galore

== R ==
- Royal Trux
- Rxseboy

== S ==
- Sebadoh
- The Silver Jews

== W ==
- Weatherday
- Ween
