= Byrd & Heart =

Thai musical duo

Byrd & Heart เบิร์ด กะ ฮาร์ท
- Origin: Bangkok, Thailand
- Genres: Pop; easy listening
- Years active: 1985–present
- Labels: Nite Spot Productions Ltd. Kita Records; Longan Sound Groove Co., Ltd; Spicy Disc Co., Ltd
- Members: Kulpong Bunnag (Byrd); Suthipongse Thatphithakkul (Heart)

Byrd & Heart is a Thai musical duo formed in 1985.

== History ==
Kulpong (nicknamed "Byrd") and Suthipongse (nicknamed "Heart") met each other in Los Angeles through a mutual connection and their shared interest in music. Along with their friends, they started performing in various Thai communities in the LA area.

While performing they recorded demos of their own original music. In the summer break of 1985 both of them went back to Thailand and handed the demos of their songs to Nite Spot Productions at the suggestion of their friends. At first Nite Spot Productions was reluctant on the demos, but agreed to air the demos on radio. Following the broadcast, the songs quickly gained popularity amongst the listeners.

They initially handed the demos without a name attached. After one of their songs was voted as the song of the month on the radio show, Nite Spot Productions contacted Heart for information.

When writing down their names Byrd's was written first and they were introduced on radio as "Byrd & Heart". It became their band's name.

== Controversies ==
=== Copyright issues over the song "ถอนตัว" ===
The song "ถอนตัว" (RTGS: Thon Tua) is a song sung by Byrd & Heart on the collaborative album "meeting" under genie records. It was a widely popular song.

The song was written by Akeapup Keatpriya (Tor) and Worawit Nimmansirikul (Bright) in 2000 for Bright's upcoming album. While awaiting recording, Suppawat Piranon (Champ) heard the song after Akeapup had played it to him. Suppawat showed interest in the song but was told that he could not do anything with it as it is a shared intellectual property. Later that year, Akeapup transferred all his rights to the song over to Worawit. However, in 2001, the song appeared on the album "meeting" with Byrd & Heart listed as the singer and Suppawat Piranon listed as the lyricist.

Worawit filed a complaint with evidence to GMM Grammy (genie records' parent company), which prompted GMM Grammy to purchase the rights to use the song only on the album, and corrected the credits on the album.

However, the issue arose again in 2015 when the song was sung at the "30 Years Byrd & Heart Sometimes but Always" concert along with Suppawat. This prompted Worawit to sue the duo for copyright infringement.

The court case went on until April 19, 2022, when the court ruled in favour of Worawit. After the ruling on May 29, 2022 the duo was interviewed on the situation and said they would never play the song again.

== Discography ==
=== Studio albums ===
| Name (RTGS) | Native Name | Year | Tracklist | Note(s) |
|---|---|---|---|---|
| Hang Kai | ห่างไกล | 1985 | 1. ไม่ลืม; 2. ห่างไกล; 3. อาลัยเธอ; 4. เพ้อ; 5. คิดถึง II; 6. ลืม; 7. คิดถึง; 8. Susan Joan; 9. สนุก; 10. รักนอกใจ | 1. A 1995 re-issue of the album included ลืม - Demo Version, อาลัยเธอ - Demo Version, Susan Joan - Demo Version, and ห่างไกล - Demo Version, the demo versions of each respective songs as additional tracks. |
| Duai Chai Rak Ching | ด้วยใจรักจริง | 1986 | 1. Goodbye Song; 2. ด้วยใจรักจริง; 3. เอื้อมดาว; 4. Lucky Star; 5. ฉันเอง; 6. ฟ้าสีคราม; 7. I Need Your Love; 8. รักเสมือนป่า; 9. คืนนั้น | 1. A 1995 re-issue of the album included Goodbye Song - Version 2, an alternative version of Goodbye Song (with Track 1 renamed to Goodbye Song - Version 1) as additional track. |
| Jak Kan Ma Nan | จากกันมานาน | 1991 | 1. จากกันมานาน; 2. รอรัก; 3. ฉันคอย; 4. ทำอย่างไร; 5. ฝน; 6. เพียงเรา; 7. Wonder Woman; 8. เมืองงาม; 9. บทเพลงสุดท้าย; 10. ลืม (previously unreleased) | 1. "ลืม (previously unreleased)" is the demo version of "ลืม" from the album Hang Klai.; 2. A 1995 re-issue of the album included เพื่อนกัน - Demo Version and รอรัก - Demo Version the demo versions of each respective songs as additional tracks. |
| Moonlighting | - | 1995 | 1. เพื่อนกัน; 2. More 'N More; 3. ดั่งตะวัน; 4. Am, I Love You; 5. You (english version) | |
| Thi Rak | ที่รัก | 1999 | 1. รักสีส้ม; 2. Anywhere You Are; 3. ที่รัก; 4. กระต่ายหมายจันทร์; 5. Once Again; 6. เพื่อนที่รู้ใจ; 7. ขวัญใจ; 8. จากกันด้วยดี; 9. เธอรู้ดี; 10. Friend; 11. รักรสส้ม | |
| Destiny | - | 2006 | 1. Interlude; 2. ช่องว่าง; 3. รักเอย; 4. ยังรัก; 5. ดอกไม้ในมือ; 6. เหมือนเดิม; 7. เธอคงเข้าใจ; 8. กรุณา...อย่า; 9. เพื่อนรัก; 10. เพราะเธอ; 11. Interlude; 12. ฉันคอย (Remix) | 1. "ฉันคอย (Remix)" is a remixed version of "ฉันคอย" from the album Jak Kan Ma Nan. |

=== Single Albums ===
| Name | Romanised name (RTGS) | Year |
|---|---|---|
| เพลงรักที่ยังไม่ลืม | Pleng Rak Thi Yang Mai Leum | 2012 |
| I Trust in You (feat. Champ Suppawat) | - | 2015 |

=== Guest Artist ===
| Album name | Year | Track Number and Track Name | Note(s) |
|---|---|---|---|
| meeting | 2001 | 2. ถอนตัว | |
| Rhythm & Boyd 24 Yrs. After | 2018 | 5. คลั่ง (Mad) | The original version of the album named Rhythm & Boyd released in 1994 has Suthipongse alone as a guest artist. |
