= Court music =

Court music may refer to various music styles associated with courts:

- Yayue, Chinese court music
- Gagaku, Japanese court music
- Korean court music
- Ottoman classical music, Turkish court music
- Nhã nhạc, Vietnamese court music
- Nobat, Malay court music in present-day Malaysia, Indonesia and Brunei
