= Reido =

Belarusian doom metal band

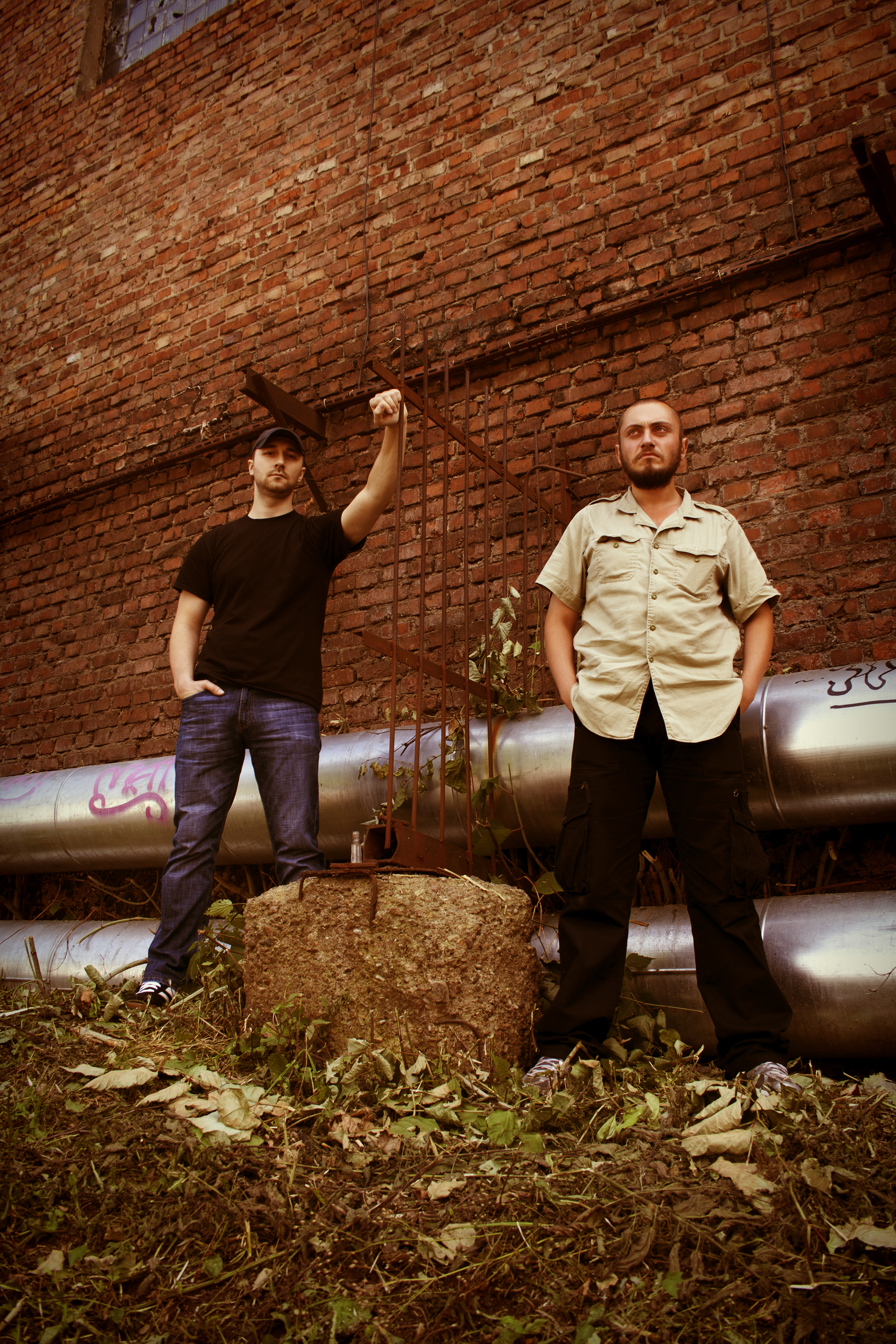
- Reido in 2011

Background information
- Origin: Minsk, Belarus
- Genres: Funeral doom death Sludge doom
- Years active: 2002–present
- Labels: Solitude, Slow Burn
- Members: Alexander Kachar; Anton Matveev
- Website: myspace.com/reidosystemcom

Reido is a Belarusian doom metal band formed in Minsk.

== Biography ==
Reido was founded in 2002 in Minsk by Alexander Kachar and Anton Matveev. They've been permanent members of the band since. In May 2006, Reido released their first full-length album, F:\all through Solitude Productions label. In October 2006, Reido released a single named Detect Memory, which was available for free download. In November 2011, the second Reido album Minus Eleven (or -11) was released by Sow Burn Records. In October 2019, their third album "Anātman" was released via Aesthetic Death.

== Musical style ==
Reido's musical style has been categorized as Funeral Doom, Post-metal, and Post-core. Reido also uses ambient sections in their tracks. The band shifted towards a melodic sound with their 2019 album Anātman. Reido's sound has been described as "emotionless" and "pure, cold bleakness", though occasional rock influences have been noted.

== Current members ==
- Alexander Kachar – guitar, vocals, bass, synthesizer
- Anton Matveev – guitar, synthesizer, sound engineering
- Dmitry Kochkin – drums

== Discography ==
=== Studio albums ===
- F:\all (2006, Solitude Productions)
- Minus Eleven (2011, Slow Burn Records)
- Anātman (2019, Aesthetic Death)

=== Singles ===
- "Detect Memory" (2006)

=== Videos ===
- Zero Level Activity (2006)
