= Mesías Maiguashca =

Ecuadorian composer

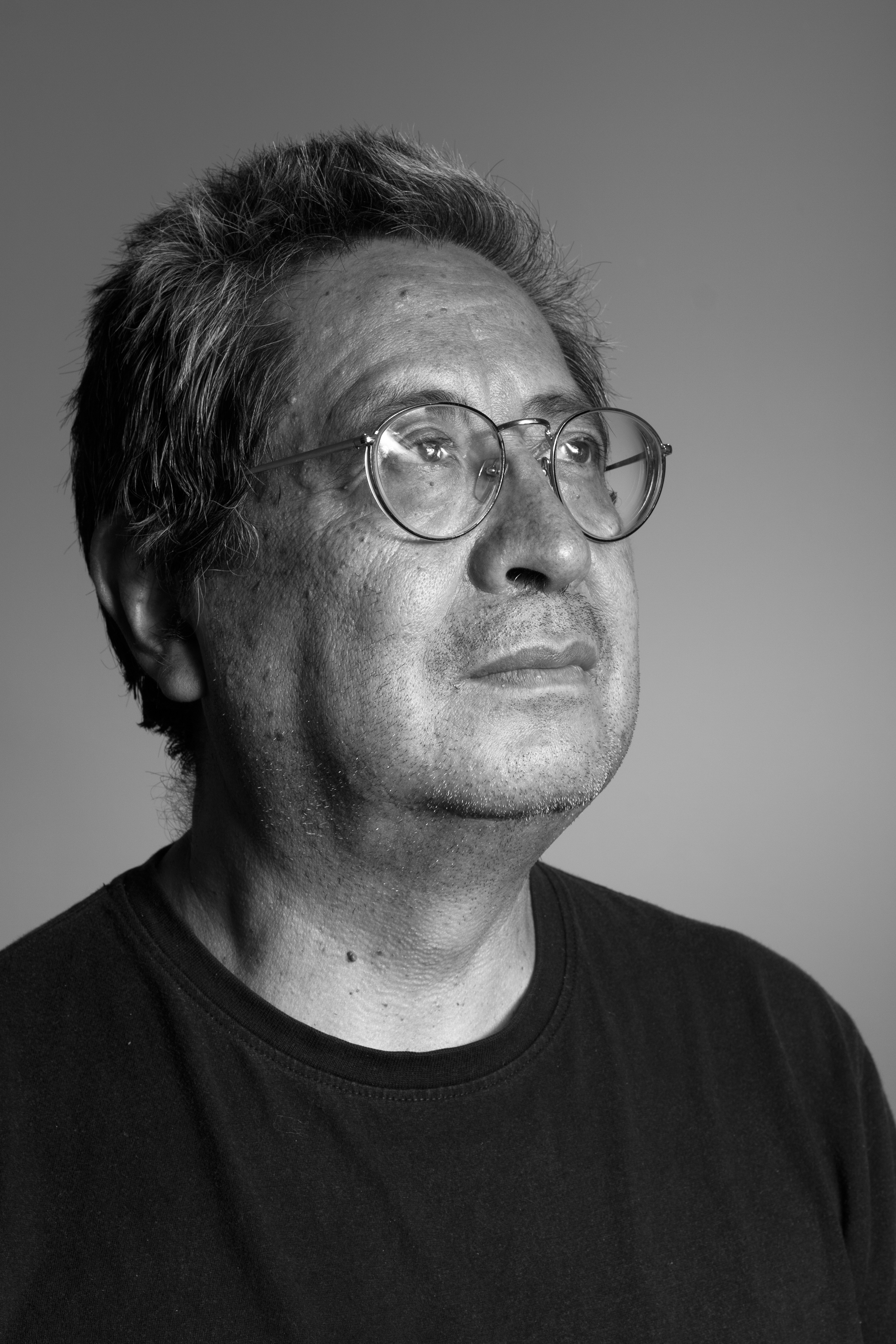
Mesias Maiguashca

Mesías Maiguashca (born 24 December 1938) is an Ecuadorian composer and an advocate of Neue Musik (New Music), especially electroacoustic music.

== Biography ==
Born in Quito, Maiguashca studied music at the Conservatorio Nacional de Quito, at the Eastman School of Music in Rochester, New York (1958–65), with Alberto Ginastera at the Instituto di Tella in Buenos Aires, and at the Hochschule für Musik in Cologne. In 1965–66 he returned to Quito to teach at the National Conservatory, but then moved back to Germany to attend the Internationale Ferienkurse für Neue Musik in Darmstadt, and the Fourth Cologne Courses for New Music in 1966–67 where he studied with Karlheinz Stockhausen. He is regarded as one of the central figures of the Cologne School, active since the mid-1970s.

Maiguashca worked closely with Stockhausen in the Electronic Music Studio of the Westdeutscher Rundfunk in Cologne from 1968 to 1972, and joined Stockhausen's ensemble for performances at the German Pavilion at Expo '70 in Osaka. He also prepared the recording of the collective composition Ensemble, organized by Stockhausen for the Darmstadt Courses in 1967. In 1971 he became a founding member of the Oeldorf Group of composers and performers, as well as beginning work at the Centre Européen pour la Recherche Musicale in Metz, at IRCAM in Paris, and at the ZKM, Zentrum für Kunst und Medientechnologie in Karlsruhe. He has taught in Metz, Stuttgart, Basel, Quito, and Győr, amongst other places. From 1990 to 2004 he was Professor of Electronic Music at the Musikhochschule of Freiburg im Breisgau, the town where he has lived since 1996.

== Works ==
=== Compositions ===
- Iridiscente, for orchestra, sound objects & electroacoustics, 2009
- Ton-Geographie IV for sound installation, violin, cello, flute, trombone & sound objects, 2007
- Boletín y elegía de las Mitas, scenic cantata on the text by César Dávila Andrade, 2006–2007
- El Tiempo for 2 flutes, 2 clarinets, 2 cellos, 2 percussionists & electronics, 1999–2000
- mini-ópera Los Enemigos, premiered: 31 October 1997 Karlsruhe, Germany.
- The Spirit Catcher for cello & live electronics, 1993
- La Seconde Ajouteé for 2 pianos. 1985
- Fmelodies II for cello, percussion & tape, 1984
- ...y ahora vamos por aquí... for 8 instruments & tape, 1977
- ÜBUNGEN for violin & synthesizer, 1972
- AYAYAYAYAY concrete music & electroacoustics, 1971
  Note: for a complete catalogue refer to the composer's website.

=== Writings ===
- Maiguashca, Mesias. 1975. "Information zu Übungen für Violine, Klarinette und Violoncello." Feedback Papers 9 (Summer): 228–32.
- Maiguashca, Mesias. 1985. "Zu FMELODIES" Neuland Jahrbuch 5:288–96.
- Maiguashca, Mesias. 1987. "Espectro—armonía—melodía—timbre". Opus Magazine, no. 13 (June, edited by Arturo Rodas and translated by Ramiro Salvador Roldán): 10–19.
- Maiguashca, Mesias. 1991. "Spectre—harmonie—mélodie—timbre." In Le timbre, métaphore pour la composition, edited by Jean-Baptiste Barrière, Catherine Delaruelle, and Anne Grange, translated by Esther Starkier and Alain Galliari, 402–11. Paris: Bourgois.

== Discography ==
- Computer Music Currents 5 (Wergo 20252):

Mesias Maiguashca, Fmelodies II and works by
J. Harvey, G. Loy, Kaija Saariaho, D. Smalley

- Reading Castañeda (Wergo 20532):

Mesias Maiguashca:
The Spirit Catcher, The Tonal, Sacatecas Dance, The Wings of Perception II, El Oro, The Nagual.

- FEEDBACK STUDIO KÖLN CD 2:

Mesias Maiguashca, Übungen for violin & Shynth. Other works by D. Johnson,
K. Barlow, S. Foretic, P. Eötvös y John McGuire.
K.O. Studio Freiburg

- ORGEL MUSIK UNSERER ZEIT IV:

Zs. Szathmáry spielt Werke from Mesias Maiguashca (Nemos Orgel)
und W. Michel, Zs. Szathmáry, H. Otte, C. Lefebvre.

- SurPlus Contemporáneos:

Published by Sumak, Música académica ecuatoriana del Siglo XX
Mesias Maiguashca, La Noche Cíclica and works by
J. Campoverde, P. Freire, A. Rodas, L. Enríquez, E. Flores & M. Estévez.
CCEN del Azuay
