= List of Houston rappers =

This is a list of rappers from Houston.

- 5th Ward Boyz
- 5th Ward Juvenilez
- Aaron May
- ABN
- Ameer Vann
- Baby Bash
- Big Hawk
- Big Mello
- Big Mike
- Big Moe
- Big Pokey
- Big Tony
- Boss Hogg Outlawz
- Botany Boyz
- Bun B
- Bushwick Bill
- C-Note
- Chamillionaire
- Chedda Da Connect
- Chingo Bling
- Choice
- Coughee Brothaz
- Crime Boss
- Deep
- Devin the Dude
- DJ Candlestick
- DJ Premier
- DJ Screw
- Don Toliver
- Doughbeezy
- E.S.G.
- Expensive Taste
- Fat Pat
- Fat Tony
- Ganksta N-I-P
- Geto Boys
- H.A.W.K.
- Hyro Da Hero
- Juan Gotti
- Kirko Bangz
- Lecrae
- Lil' Flip
- Lil' Keke
- Lil' O
- Lil' Troy
- Lucky Luciano
- Maxo Kream
- Megan Thee Stallion
- Menace Clan
- Mike Jones
- Monaleo
- Mr. 3-2
- Mr. Mike
- OG Ron C
- O.G. Style
- Paul Wall
- Pimp C
- Riff Raff
- Sauce Walka
- SaulPaul
- Scarface
- Screwed Up Click
- Slim Thug
- South Park Mexican
- That Mexican OT
- Travis Scott
- Tobe Nwigwe
- Too Much Trouble
- Trae tha Truth
- Trinity Garden Cartel
- T-Wayne
- UGK
- Ugly God
- Viper
- Willie D
- Z-Ro
