= Arnold Wiley =

American pianist (1898–1964)

Doc Wiley Arnold Burke Wiley
- Born: Arnold Burke Wiley; October 3, 1898; New Madrid, Missouri, U.S.
- Origin: Helena, Arkansas, U.S.
- Died: October 1, 1964 (aged 65)
- Genres: Ragtime, Blues, Rhythm and blues, Boogie-woogie, Stride piano, Jump blues
- Occupations: Musician, singer, dancer, pianist, actor, political activist
- Instruments: Piano, vocals
- Years active: 1910s–1960s
- Labels: Paramount Records, Brunswick Records, Columbia Records, Sensation Records, King Records, Bullet Records, Ace Records
- Formerly of: Wiley & Wiley
- Spouse: Bertha Wiley (divorced)

Arnold Burke "Doc" Wiley (October 3, 1898 – October 1964) was an American ragtime, blues and rhythm and blues musician, actor and political activist from the 1910s to the 1960s. Although Wiley may not have scored any notable hits during his long career, he was notable both for the sheer length of that career, which stretched from the ragtime era to the early years of rock and roll and for his ability to constantly adapt his style to these changing tastes.

== Early life ==
Born in New Madrid, Missouri, Wiley ran away from home as a youth to join a Chinese circus where he performed as an acrobat. He later returned to his family and moved to Helena, Arkansas, where he joined the local black ragtime scene as a singer, dancer, and pianist where he played with such figures as Roosevelt Sykes, William Ezell and Jesse Bell. In 1918 he married a singer named Bertha with whom he had a son, Arnold, Jr., the next year. That year Wiley was arrested for theft and served a year in an Arkansas prison before being released. He was in prison in 1920.

Upon release, he returned to the local vaudeville circuit with his wife as Wiley & Wiley, with Arnold playing piano and Bertha singing and dancing. Arnold began taking the name Doc Wiley after a popular baseball player of the Negro leagues. Their material was ragtime-influenced and received good reviews; however, Bertha disliked touring so when Arnold decided to move to Chicago in 1925 she remained behind. Arnold reformed the duo with his sister Irene, thus keeping the name Wiley & Wiley. Bernice was a stronger singer, influenced by the more modern blues singing of Mamie Smith and Arnold's style became similarly more influenced by the boogie-woogie and stride piano styles of Pinetop Smith, Willie "The Lion" Smith, Fats Waller and James P. Johnson. They were soon spotted by Paramount Records talent scout J. Mayo Williams who recruited them for recording sessions backing Jimmy Bryant's Washtub Band.

== Music career ==
The next few years saw Arnold's band in several variations, which included a combination of Irene or Bertha and Arnold, Jr. as a dancer, and comic-pianist Joe Simms. They toured heavily but did not record until 1927 when Bertha quit for good after doing some recordings for Paramount. Arnold and Irene recorded a series of singles for Brunswick Records starting that year, including "Windy City" b/w "Arnold Wiley Rag" which met with some success. Wiley's career was again put on hold when he was again arrested, this time for violating the prohibition laws, and served six months in 1930. Upon release, Wiley & Wiley returned to the studio for Columbia Records recording "Rootin' Bo Hog Blues" which was a hit and later covered by Ramblin' Thomas and Sonny Boy Williamson I.

During the Great Depression recording opportunities were few but Wiley continued to work steadily in various bands as well as solo. He also moved into acting via the W.P.A.-funded Federal Theater where he met pioneering black film director Oscar Micheaux (for whom he appeared in at least one film) and actor Canada Lee. Lee was also a political activist and he and Wiley became members of the Communist Party USA and were involved with various causes, particularly civil rights.

By the end of the 1930s, Arnold had resumed his partnership with his sister Irene as well as playing with Cow Cow Davenport who would influence his sound. Deferred from the draft during the Second World War, Wiley continued performing and made his way to New York and Detroit where he was once again signed by Mayo Williams and recorded several singles for Sensation Records and King Records throughout the 1940s.

Wiley's post-WWII recordings showed he had once again adapted to the changing tastes. He had formed a Rhythm and Blues trio similar to those of Johnny Moore, Charles Brown, Slim Gaillard and Nat King Cole including a guitar or vibraphone and saxophone. Wiley played in his boogie-woogie and stride style and sang in a relaxed drawling tenor.

This trio made a series of singles including "How Long Blues" (originally by Leroy Carr and Scrapper Blackwell), "Wild Cat Boogie", "Every Day of the Week" (originally by Big Joe Turner), "I'm in Love Again" (by Lonnie Johnson) and "Chain Gang Blues". By the 1950s, Wiley had moved to Memphis and Nashville and once again updated to a jump blues style of the early rock and roll era, recording for Bullet Records and, finally in 1959, Ace Records. By the end of his life, Wiley's health had deteriorated. A lifetime heavy smoker he had developed tuberculosis and later lung cancer. On his Ace recordings, Wiley's voice had deteriorated and his piano parts were played by Sammy Price. Wiley retired soon thereafter and was forced to go on welfare and live with his sister Irene who cared for him until his death.
