= Luis Humberto Salgado =

Ecuadorian composer (1903–1977)

Luis Humberto Salgado (1903 Cayambe – 1977 Quito) was an Ecuadorian composer. He was regarded as one of the most influential and prolific composers of his country.

== Biography ==
He was taught by his father, the composer Francisco Salgado, a former student of the Italian composer Domenico Brescia (who championed nationalism in Chile and Ecuador before permanently settling down in the USA). During the 1920s, Salgado made a living as a pianist for silent films in Quito. He later he worked as a critic, teacher, and choir and orchestra conductor; he also was director of the National Conservatory of Music in Quito.

In his essay Música vernácula ecuatoriana (Microestudio), published in 1952 in Casa de la Cultura Ecuatoriana, he expresses his thoughts about the creation of a national form. For example, he replaced the classical symphonic pattern (Allegro - Larghetto - Allegretto Scherzo - Allegro Vivace) with a sequence of Ecuadorian folk dances:

Ecuadorian Symphony
I Sanjuanito
II Yaraví
III Danzante
IV Albazo, Aire típico or Alza

Luis Humberto Salgado was the leading figure of his generation. His symphonic suite Atahualpa (1933), his Suite coreográfica (1946), the ballets El amaño (1947), and El Dios Tumbal (1952) and other works show strong nationalistic feeling. Salgado also wrote two operas, Cumandá (1940, rev. 1954); Eunice (1956-7) that were never produced. Salgado was not an exclusively nationalist composer, as the varied style of his eight symphonies shows. In his later years, he even relied on atonality and tried his hand at 12-note composition. – Béhague, Gerard. 2001. "Ecuador. Art Music"

Though only two of his operas are mentioned in most music literature, he composed another two, together with nine symphonies, several concertos, several ballets. He was both a nationalist and a modernist composer. As early as 1944, he wrote Sanjuanito Futurista for piano, using the rhythm of a traditional Ecuadorian dance within the dodecaphonic writing style. He was in his early forties when he started experimenting with new techniques but was not acknowledged as a modernist until later in his life.

== Compositions ==
List
Year	Work	Description
1933	Atahualpa o el ocaso de un Imperio (symphonic band)	orchestra
1934	Ensueño de amor	operetta
1936	Canto de Libertad	ballet
1937	Andante for violin & orchestra	orchestra
1940 (rev. 1954)	Cumandá	opera
1941	La consagración de las vírgenes del sol - Concerto for piano & orchestra	orchestra
1944	Sanjuanito futurista (micro dance for piano)	solo (piano)
1944	Cantata amerindia	vocal
1945	Alma nativa	vocal
1947	El Páramo (Preludio Andino-Ecuatoriano)	
1947	Alejandría la pagana, melodrama	orchestra
1946	Suite coreográfica	ballet
1947	El Amaño	ballet
1947	Qué lindo es el cariño (sanjuanito)	song
1947	Quiteño de Quito (pasacalle)	song
1948	Concierto fantasía en estilo nacional for piano & orchestra	orchestra
1948	Variaciones en estilo folclórico	orchestra
1949	Día de Corpus	opera-ballet
1949	Symphony No. 1, "Andina" in G minor (revised in 1972 and renamed Sinfonía de ritmos vernaculares)	orchestra
1949	Sismo (symphonic poem)	orchestra
1950	Pieza característica	orchestra
1952	El Dios Tumbal	ballet
1953	Concierto para violín y orquesta in E Major	orchestra
1953	Symphony No. 2, "Sintética (No. 1)"", in D minor	orchestra
1955	Symphony No. 3, "Sobre un Tema Rococó: A-D-H-G-E", in D Major	orchestra
1955	Danzas ecuatorianas for flute and orchestra	flute and orchestra
1957	Symphony No. 4, "Ecuatoriana", in D Major	orchestra
1957	Eunice	opera
1958	Symphony No. 5, "Neo-Romántica"	orchestra
1959	Homenaje a la danza criolla (symphonic poem)	orchestra
1961	Aidita	vocal
1961	El Centurión	opera
1963	Concerto for Piano and Harp Obbligato	orchestra
1966	Misa Solemne in D major (in five movements)	choir & orchestra
1966	Misa Solemne (in four movements	choir & orchestra
1968	Symphony No. 6	string orchestra and timpani
1968	Concerto for French Horn and Orchestra	orchestra
1969	Suite ecuatoriana	orchestra
1969	Ferviente anhelo (pasillo)	song
1970	Symphony No. 7 in E minor (dedicated to the bicentennial of Beethoven’s birth)	orchestra
1971	El Tribuno	opera
1972	Symphony No. 8, in E minor (dedicated to the sesquicentennial of the Battle of Pichincha	orchestra
1975	Concerto for Cello and Orchestra	orchestra
1976	Ecuadorian Concerto for guitar and orchestra	orchestra
1977	Symphony No. 9, "Sintética (No. 2)", in D Major	orchestra

== Discography ==
- The nine symphonies (3 CDs) by the Cuenca Symphony orchestra conducted by Michael Meissner
- Piano Music by Ecuadorian Composers CD. Piano: [Alex Alarcon Fabre],

Brindis por la peaña (alza) (Luis Humberto Salgado)
Nocturnal (pasillo) (Luis Humberto Salgado)
Other works by: Gerardo Guevara, Corsino Duran, Claudio Aizaga, Juan Pablo Muñoz Sanz

Souvenir de l'Amérique du Sud (CD) (piano, Marcelo Ortiz, works by: Gerardo Guevara, Sixto María Durán and Miguel Ángel Casares)

- I. Amanecer de trasnochada (pasillo) - Luis H. Salgado
- Brindis al pasado (pasillo) - Luis H. Salgado
- II. Romance nativo (sanjuanito) - Luis H. Salgado
- VI. Nocturnal (pasillo) - Luis H. Salgado

== Writings ==
- Salgado, Luis H. Música vernácula ecuatoriana (Microestudio), published in 1952 by Casa de la Cultura Ecuatoriana
- Salgado, Luis H. Proyecciones de la música contemporánea, published in September 1960 by Ritmo, Madrid, Spain.
