= Parason =

Belarusian rock band

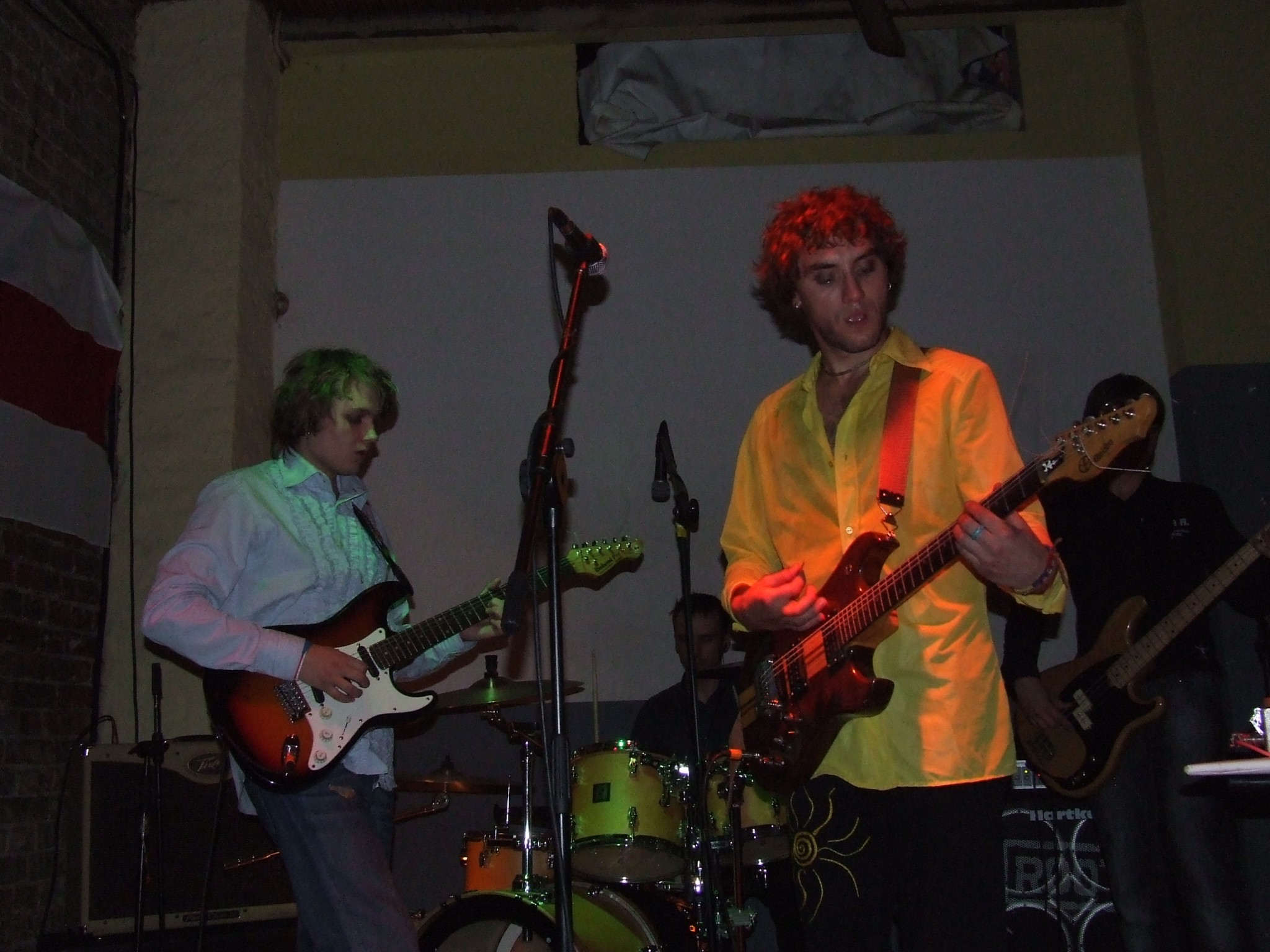
Parason

Parason (stands for "Umbrella" in Belarusian) is a rock band from Belarus, one of the winners of Basovišča in 2006. Leader of Parason is Andre Karp. Being interviewed by Muzykalnaya Gazeta in 2006, Aleh Vial, frontman of Hair Peace Salon, admitted that the band is close to his one in terms of musical style.
