= Stone Metal Fire =

Thai rock band

- Also known as: SMF
- Origin: Bangkok, Thailand
- Genres: Heavy metal; hard rock; power metal; speed metal
- Years active: 1991–1995, 2005–present
- Labels: RS Promotion; Real and Sure
- Members: Pathompong Sombatpiboon; Jakkarin Daungmaneerattanachai; Nampol Raksapong; Narong Sirisarnsoonthorn; Damrongsith Srinak; Prateep Vorapat
- Past members: Samann Yuanpeng; Selvester Lester C. Esteban
- Website: stonemetalfire.com

Stone Metal Fire, known in Thai as Hin Lek Fai (หิน เหล็ก ไฟ) and stylized as SMF, is a Thai rock band formed in 1991, whose popularity peaked during that decade.

== History ==
Stone Metal Fire was formed in 1991 by Pathompong "Pong" Sombatpiboon (โป่ง: ปฐมพงษ์ สมบัติพิบูลย์), former lead vocalist of the Olarn Project, and guitarist Jakkarin "Pop" Daungmaneerattanachai (ป๊อป: จักรรินทร์ ดวงมณีรัตนชัย). They released their first studio album, the self-titled หิน เหล็ก ไฟ, in 1993. They also issued the compilation album ร็อกเพื่อนกัน the same year. This was followed by คนยุคเหล็ก in 1995, after which the band became inactive. In 2005, they published the album Never Say Die and followed it with the live recording Acoustique a year later.

== Band members ==
Current

- Pathompong "Pong" Sombatpiboon (โป่ง: ปฐมพงษ์ สมบัติพิบูลย์) – vocals
- Jakkarin "Pop" Daungmaneerattanachai (ป๊อป: จักรรินทร์ ดวงมณีรัตนชัย) – guitar
- Nampol "To" Raksapong (โต: นำพล รักษาพงษ์) – guitar
- Narong "Rong" Sirisarnsoonthorn (รงค์: ณรงค์ ศิริสารสุนทร) – bass
- Damrongsith "Pingpong" Srinak (ปิงปอง: ดำรงสิทธิ์ ศรีนาค) – drums
- Prateep "Moo" Vorapat (หมู: ประทีป วรภัทร) – keyboards

Past

- Samann "Mann" Yuanpeng (หมาน: สมาน ยวนเพ็ง) – drums
- Selvester Lester C. Esteban – drums

== Discography ==
- หิน เหล็ก ไฟ (1993)
- ร็อกเพื่อนกัน (compilation, 1993)
- คนยุคเหล็ก (1995)
- Never Say Die (2005)
- Acoustique (live album, 2006)
