= Enrique Espín Yépez =

Ecuadorian composer and violinist

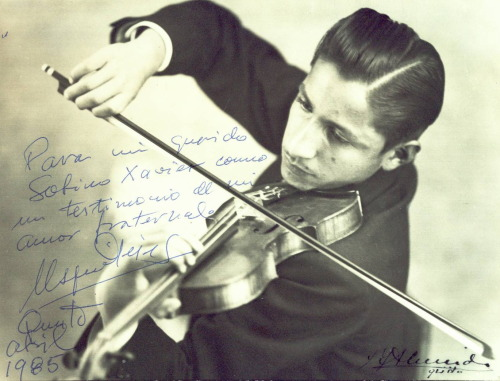
Enrique Espín Yépez

Enrique Espín Yépez (November 19, 1926 – May 21, 1997) was an Ecuadorean composer and violinist. Born in Quito, he moved to Mexico in 1969, where he established himself as a professor of violin at the National Conservatory of Mexico. He was a student of Maestro Henryk Szeryng, who declared him heir of his technique. In December 1975 Szeryng bestowed Espín with a Ceruti violin, made in 1801. Espín created the Henryk Szeryng International Violin Competition in Mexico in 1992. He died in Mexico City in 1997.
