= Ecuadorians =

People of Ecuador

Ecuadorians Ecuatorianos

Total population
- c. 19 million (Diaspora) c. 2 million

Regions with significant populations
- Ecuador: 17.8 million (2021)
- United States: 1,068,919
- Spain: 468,751
- Italy: 66,590
- Chile: 50,460
- Canada: 25,410
- Brazil: 16,510
- Germany: 16,000
- Colombia: 11,404
- France: 10,249
- United Kingdom: 9,422
- Peru: 8,000
- Sweden: 2,627
- Mexico: 3,000
- Australia: 3,000
- Japan: 2,000
- Puerto Rico: 1,601

Languages
- Ecuadorian Spanish, Indigenous languages

Religion
- Predominantly Roman Catholic; Protestant, Indigenous Amerindian religion

Related ethnic groups
- Other Latin Americans, Indigenous people of the Americas

Ecuadorians (Spanish: ecuatorianos) are people identified with the South American country of Ecuador. This connection may be residential, legal, historical or cultural. For most Ecuadorians, several (or all) of these connections exist and are collectively the source of their being Ecuadorian.

Numerous indigenous cultures inhabited what is now Ecuadorian territory for several millennia before the expansion of the Inca Empire in the fifteenth century. The Las Vegas culture of coastal Ecuador is one of the oldest cultures in the Americas. The Valdivia culture is another well-known early Ecuadorian culture. Spaniards arrived in the sixteenth century, as did sub-Saharan Africans who were enslaved and transported across the Atlantic by Spaniards and other Europeans. The modern Ecuadorian population is principally descended from these three ancestral groups.

As of the 2022 census, 85.17% of the population identified as Mestizo, a mix of Spanish and Indigenous American ancestry, up from 71.9% in 2000. The percentage of the population which identifies as European Ecuadorian was 2.2%, which fell from 6.1% in 2010 and 10.5% in 2000. Indigenous Ecuadorians account for 7.7% of the population and 4.8% of the population consists of Afro-Ecuadorians. Genetic research indicates that the ancestry of Ecuadorian Mestizos is on average 53.8% Amerindian ancestry, 38.3% European ancestry and 7.4% African ancestry.

== Ethnic groups ==
There are five major ethnic groups in Ecuador: Mestizo, European Ecuadorian, Afro-Ecuadorian, Indigenous, and Montubio. The 2022 census reported Mestizos constitute more than 77.5% of the population, 7.7% Indigenous American, 7.7% Montubio, 4.8% Afro-Ecuadorian and 2.2% European Ecuadorian.

Ecuador's population primarily descends from Spanish immigrants and South American Indigenous peoples, admixed with descendants of enslaved sub-Saharan Africans who arrived to work on coastal plantations in the sixteenth century. The mix of these groups is described as Mestizo or Cholo.

According to Kluck, writing in 1989, ethnic groups in Ecuador have had a traditional hierarchy of European Ecuadorian, Mestizo, Afro-Ecuadorians, and then others. Her review depicts this hierarchy as a consequence of colonial attitudes and of the terminology of colonial legal distinctions. Spanish-born persons residing in the New World (peninsulares) were at the top of the social hierarchy, followed by criollos, born of two Spanish parents in the colonies. The 19th century usage of Mestizo was to denote a person of mixed heritage, with one parent of European descent (often Spanish) and one parent of Indigenous American descent; a Cholo had one Indigenous American parent and one Mestizo parent. By the 20th century, Mestizo and Cholo were frequently used interchangeably. Kluck suggested that societal relationships, occupation, manners, and clothing all derived from ethnic affiliation.

Ethnic composition of Ecuador - 2022 census
Mestizo	European Ecuadorian	Indigenous	Montubio	Afro-Ecuadorian	other
77.5	2.2	7.7	7.7	4.8	0.1

Nonetheless, according to Kluck, individuals could potentially switch ethnic affiliation if they had culturally adapted to the recipient group; such switches were made without resort to subterfuge. Moreover, the precise criteria for defining ethnic groups varies considerably. The vocabulary that more prosperous Mestizos and European Ecuadorians used in describing ethnic groups mixes social and biological characteristics. Ethnic affiliation thus is dynamic; Indigenous Ecuadorians often become Mestizos, and prosperous Mestizos seek to improve their status sufficiently to be considered European Ecuadorian. Ethnic identity reflects numerous characteristics, only one of which is physical appearance; others include dress, language, community membership, and self-identification.

A geography of ethnicity remained well-defined until the surge in migration that began in the 1950s. European Ecuadorians resided primarily in larger cities. Mestizos lived in small towns scattered throughout the countryside. Indigenous peoples formed the bulk of the Sierra rural populace, although Mestizos filled this role in the areas with few Indigenous peoples. Most Afro-Ecuadorians lived in Esmeraldas Province, with small enclaves found in the Carchi and Imbabura provinces. Pressure on Sierra land resources and the dissolution of the traditional hacienda, however, increased the numbers of Indigenous peoples migrating to the Costa, the Oriente, and the cities. By the 1980s, Sierra Indigenous people—or Indigenous peoples in the process of switching their ethnic identity to that of Mestizos—lived on Costa plantations, in Quito, Guayaquil, and other cities, and in colonization areas in the Oriente and the Costa. Indeed, Sierra Indigenous peoples residing in the coastal region substantially outnumbered the remaining original Costa inhabitants, the Chachi and Tsáchila Indigenous people. In the late 1980s, analysts estimated that there were only about 4,000 Chachi and Tsáchila Indigenous peoples. Some Afro-Ecuadorians had migrated from the remote region of the Ecuadorian-Colombian border to the towns and cities of Esmeraldas.

=== Afro-Ecuadorian ===
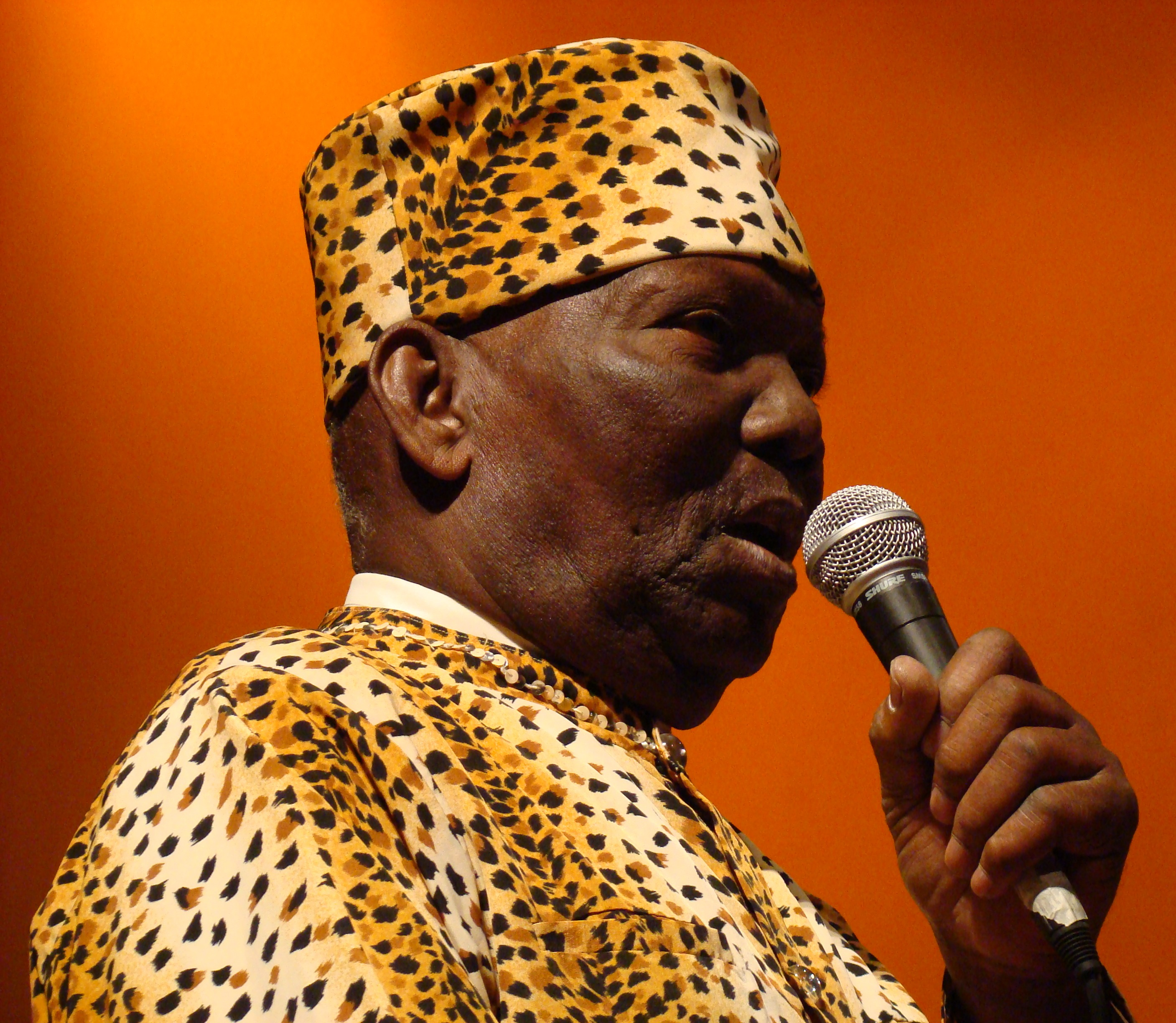
Papá Roncón, afroecuadorian singer

Afro-Ecuadorians are an ethnic group in Ecuador who are descendants of enslaved sub-Saharan Africans brought by the Spanish. The first group arrived in 1553 when a slave ship wrecked, allowing them to escape and form maroon settlements in Esmeraldas, which became a refuge. Over time, they dispersed throughout Ecuador. Despite the abolition of slavery in 1851, Afro-Ecuadorians have faced significant discrimination and marginalization from mestizo and criollo populations, leading to higher rates of poverty due to a lack of government funding and limited social mobility. While concentrated in the northwest coastal region, particularly Esmeraldas (70% of the Afro-Ecuadorian population) and Valle del Chota, they also have notable populations in cities like Guayaquil and Ibarra. Afro-Ecuadorians have made significant contributions, especially in sports, with many national football team members originating from Valle del Chota.

Ecuador has a population of about 1,120,000 descendants from sub-Saharan African people. They make up from 3% to 5% of Ecuador's population. The Afro-Ecuadorian culture is found primarily in the country's northwest coastal region. Afro-Ecuadorians form a majority (70%) in the province of Esmeraldas and also have an important concentration in the Valle del Chota in the Imbabura Province. They can be also found in significant numbers in Quito and Guayaquil.

=== Indigenous ===
==== Sierra Indigenous ====
Sierra Indigenous people had an estimated population of 1.5 to 2 million in the early 1980s and live in the intermontane valleys of the Andes. Prolonged contact with Hispanic culture, which dates back to the conquest, has had a homogenizing effect, reducing the variation among the indigenous Sierra tribes.

The Indigenous people of the Sierra are separated from European Ecuadorians and Mestizos by a caste-like gulf. They are marked as a disadvantaged group; to be an Indigenous person in Ecuador is to be stigmatized. Poverty rates are higher and literacy rates are lower among Indigenous than the general population. They enjoy limited participation in national institutions and are often excluded from social and economic opportunities available to more privileged groups. However, some groups of Indigenous people, such as the Otavalo people, have increased their socioeconomic status to extent that they enjoy a higher standard of living than many other Indigenous groups in Ecuador and many Mestizos of their area.

Visible markers of ethnic affiliation, especially hairstyle, dress, and language, separate Indigenous Ecuadorians from the rest of the populace. Indigenous Ecuadorians wore more manufactured items by the late 1970s than previously; their clothing, nonetheless, was distinct from that of other rural inhabitants. Indigenous Ecuadorians in communities relying extensively on wage labor sometimes assumed Western-style dress while still maintaining their Indigenous identity. Indigenous Ecuadorians speak Spanish and, Quichua—a Quechua dialect—although most are bilingual, speaking Spanish as a second language with varying degrees of facility. By the late 1980s, some younger Indigenous Ecuadorians no longer learned Quichua.

==== Oriente Indigenous ====
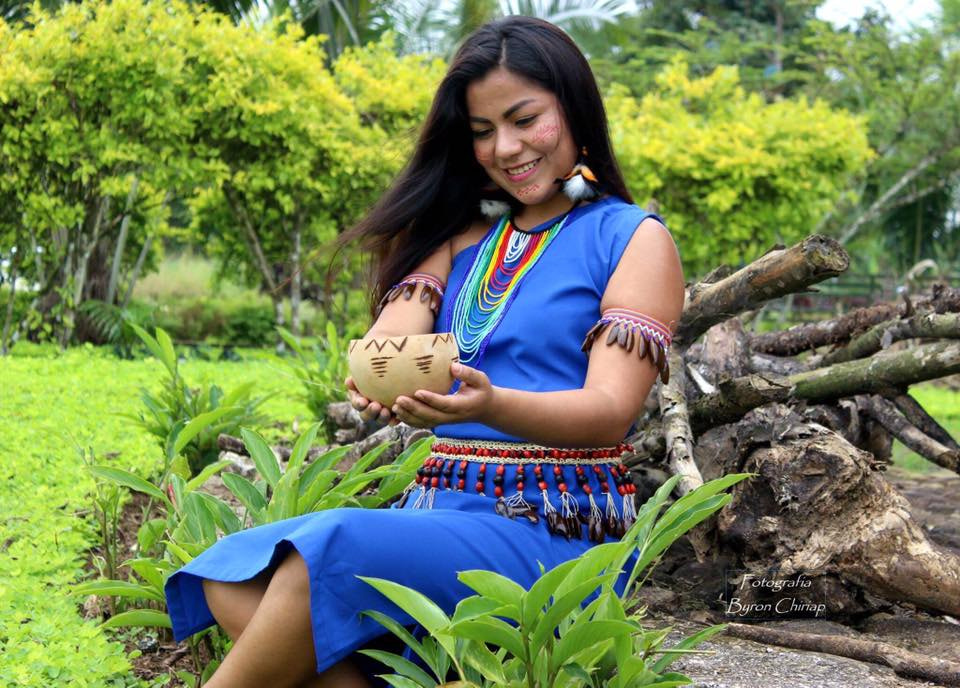
Shuar women

Although the Indigenous people of the Oriente first came into contact with Europeans in the 16th century, the encounters were more sporadic than those of most of the country's indigenous population. Until the 19th century, most non-Indigenous Americans entering the region were either traders or missionaries. Beginning in the 1950s, however, the government built roads and encouraged settlers from the Sierra to colonize the Amazon River Basin. Virtually all remaining Indigenous Ecuadorians were brought into increasing contact with national society. The interaction between Indigenous Americans and foreigners had a profound impact on the indigenous way of life.

In the late 1970s, roughly 30,000 Quichua speakers and 15,000 Shuar and Achuar peoples lived in Oriente Indigenous communities. Quichua speakers (sometimes referred to as the Yumbo people) grew out of the detribalization of members of many different groups after the Spanish conquest. Subject to the influence of Quichua-speaking missionaries and traders, various elements of the Yumbo people adopted the language as a lingua franca and gradually lost their previous languages and tribal origins. Yumbo people were scattered throughout the Oriente, whereas the Shuar and the Achuar peoples were concentrated in southeastern Ecuador. Some also lived in northeastern Peru. Traditionally, both groups relied on migration to resolve intracommunity conflict and to limit the ecological damage to the tropical forest caused by slash-and-burn agriculture.

The Yumbo, Shuar and Achuar peoples depended on agriculture as their primary means of subsistence. Manioc, the main staple, was grown in conjunction with a wide variety of other fruits and vegetables. Yumbo men also resorted to wage labor to obtain cash for the few purchases deemed necessary. By the mid-1970s, increasing numbers of Quichua speakers settled around some of the towns and missions of the Oriente. Indigenous Ecuadorians themselves had begun to make a distinction between Christian and jungle Indigenous people. The former engaged in trade with townspeople. The Shuar and Achuar peoples, in contrast to the Christian Quichua speakers, lived in more remote areas. Their mode of horticulture was similar to that of the non-Christian Yumbo people, although they supplemented crop production with hunting and some livestock raising.

Shamans (curanderos) played a pivotal role in social relations in both groups. As the main leaders and the focus of local conflicts, shamans were believed to both cure and kill through magical means. In the 1980s group conflicts between rival shamans still erupted into full-scale feuds with loss of life.

The Oriente Indigenous population dropped precipitously during the initial period of intensive contact with outsiders. The destruction of their crops by Mestizos laying claim to indigenous lands, the rapid exposure to diseases to which Indians lacked immunity, and the extreme social disorganization all contributed to increased mortality and decreased birth rates. One study of the Shuar people in the 1950s found that the group between ten and nineteen years of age was smaller than expected. This was the group that had been youngest and most vulnerable during the initial contact with national society. Normal population growth rates began to reestablish themselves after approximately the first decade of such contact.

=== White Ecuadorian ===
Ecuadorians with European ancestry generally enjoyed privileged positions as professionals, government officials, merchants, and financiers. Their original situation in the society changed particularly after the surge in internal migration that began in the 1950s. According to the most-recent 2022 national census, 2.2% of Ecuadorians self-identified as European Ecuadorian, a decrease from 6.1% in 2010. Prior to this, a more defined geography of ethnicity existed, with Ecuadorians with higher European ancestry living in the "Austro" (Southern Andes) and Manabí regions, as well as the main cities Quito and Guayaquil. Their customs, rooted in Spanish colonial traditions, emphasized European cultural norms. However, as migration to cities intensified and societal mixing increased, these customs began to intermingle with those of other Ecuadorian groups, particularly Mestizos. This process of "mestizaje" was a dominant force throughout the century. The terms "chullas" and "chagras" highlight an aspect of this internal migration and evolving identity. "Chullas" were traditionally associated with Quito, often referring to a certain urban, somewhat bohemian or rogue character, distinct from the rural populace. In contrast, "chagras" specifically denote the skilled cowboys and horsemen of the Andean highlands, particularly around areas like Cotopaxi, became later a word to refer to all the people who recently had migrated to the capital city.

This phenomenon can also be seen in other cities like Loja. The specific dialect of Spanish spoken in Loja is noted for retaining a feature called "lleísmo," where the "ll" sound is pronounced distinctly from "y," a characteristic more common in older Castilian Spanish. This linguistic detail subtly points to a deeper preservation of certain Spanish phonetic traditions in the region. Furthermore, Loja's reputation as the "Music and Cultural Capital of Ecuador" is built upon a blend of traditions, where Spanish musical forms where better preserved, creating a unique Lojano cultural identity.

Manabí's also has a history of European ancestry compared to some other Ecuadorian regions which can be attributed to several historical factors. Firstly, the province was a key early point of Spanish colonial settlement. Portoviejo was founded in 1535, making it one of the first Spanish cities in Ecuador, serving as a hub for coastal control and expeditions. This early and sustained presence of Spanish colonists, including administrators, soldiers, and settlers, contributed significantly to create a European identity. Secondly, the nature of economic activity in Manabí, particularly its fertile agricultural lands and strategic coastal access, have attracted a larger and more stable influx of Spanish settlers compared to some remote highland areas that were more resistant to direct Spanish settlement and where indigenous populations remained more numerous and culturally intact.

This group of Ecuadorians were highly influenced by the arrival of Lebanese migrants in Ecuador, primarily from the late 19th century, marked the beginning of a significant socio-economic transformation for this community. Fleeing the Ottoman Empire, these immigrants, often mislabeled as "Turks," typically began as peddlers, quickly gaining an understanding of the local market. Their timing coincided with Ecuador's cocoa export boom, especially in Guayaquil, which created opportunities for those entering retail and wholesale trade. Leveraging strong family networks and transnational connections, they expanded from small shops into larger enterprises, building capital and an entrepreneurial foundation that would define their future success. As generations progressed, Lebanese Ecuadorians diversified their economic interests, moving into key sectors like industry, banking, real estate, and media. Their work ethic and business acumen allowed them to amass considerable economic power. This financial strength eventually provided the pathway into the country's political landscape. By the late 20th century, individuals of Lebanese descent had become an integral part of Ecuador's elite, reaching the highest echelons of political power. This included multiple presidents, such as, Abdalá Bucaram, and Jamil Mahuad, as well as prominent vice presidents like Alberto Dahik and influential mayors like Jaime Nebot.

== Genetic Ancestry of Ecuadorians ==
Over the past few years, several studies have been conducted on the genetic composition of Ecuadorians. These studies have helped determine the genetic origin of mestizaje (mixed-ancestry) in Ecuador. Various international universities and independent research teams, such as Cornell University and the University of Brasilia, have carried out these studies, with their findings published in scientific journals like DNA Tribes, Science Direct, PLoS Genetics, Research Gate, American Journal of Biology, and Nature, among others. Based on an average of the recent studies since 2008, the genetic composition of Ecuadorians is approximately:

- 53.8% Amerindian ancestry
- 38.3% European ancestry
- 7.4% African ancestry

The studies based on Y-STRs and mitochondrial DNA (mtDNA) offer complementary views into Ecuadorian ancestry due to their distinct inheritance patterns: Y-STRs, found on the Y-chromosome, are passed exclusively from father to son, making them ideal for tracing the direct paternal line. Conversely, mtDNA, located in cellular mitochondria, is inherited solely from mother to all her children, allowing for the direct tracing of the maternal line. To better understand the mestizaje in Ecuador, a study analyzing Y-STRs in 415 Ecuadorian men across the Amazon, Andes, and Pacific coast revealed that the majority of ancestry is European is located in the coast and the south of Ecuador. The concentration of Amerindian ancestry was located in the northern andes and the Amazon Region, while the African component concentrated in the northwest part of the country. The list of the most relevant studies is the following:

Amerindian	European	African	Arab	Asian	Study	Year	Source
64,6 %	31,0 %	4,4 %	—	—	O impacto das migrações na constituição genética de populações latino-americanas	2008	Universidad de Brasilia
53,9 %	38,8 %	7,3 %	—	—	Genome-wide patterns of population structure and admixture among Hispanic/Latino populations	2009	Universidad de Cornell
49,1 %	36,8 %	6,1 %	4,7 %	—	DNA Tribes SNP Admixture Results by Population	2012	DNA Tribes
56,0 %	39,5 %	4,5 %	—	—	Admixture and genetic relationships of Mexican Mestizos regarding Latin American and Caribbean populations based on 13 CODIS-STRs	2015	Homo: Journal of Comparative Human Biology
50,1 %	40,8 %	6,8 %	—	2,3 %	Genomic Insights into the Ancestry and Demographic History of South America	2015	PLoS Genetics
52,0 %	42,0 %	6,0 %	—	—	Admixture in the Américas: Regional and National Differences	2016	Research Gate
47,1 %	38,3 %	14,6 %	—	—	A Study of the Molecular Variants Associated with Lactase Persistencein Different Ecuadorian Ethnic Group	2016	American Journal of Biology
59,6 %	28,8 %	11,6 %	—	—	The three-hybrid genetic composition of an Ecuadorian population using AIMs-InDels compared with autosomes, mitochondrial DNA and Y chromosome data	2019	Nature

== Culture ==
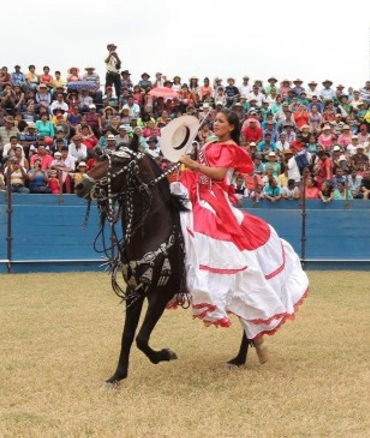
Montuvio rodeo

Since African slavery was not the workforce of the Spanish colonies in the Andes Mountains of South America, given the subjugation of the indigenous people through evangelism and encomiendas, the minority population of African descent is mostly found in the coastal northern province of Esmeraldas. This is largely owing to the 17th century shipwreck of a slave-trading galleon off the northern coast of Ecuador. Ecuador's indigenous communities are integrated into the mainstream culture to varying degrees, but some may also practice their own indigenous cultures, particularly the more remote indigenous communities of the Amazon basin.

=== Language ===
Most Ecuadorians speak Spanish. According to the last Census of 2022, of the 7.7% of the population that identifies as indigenous, 3.2% speak an indigenous language. That means that from a total indigenous population of 1'302.057 people, 50,4% of them do not speak an indigenous language. In absolute numbers, that 3.2% of the population amounts to 645.821 people that speak an indigenous language. The distribution is the following:

- Kichwa with 527,333 speakers, making up 40.5% of the total indigenous population.
- Shuar with 59,894 speakers, making up 4.6% of the total indigenous population.
- Other languages with 58,594 speakers, making up 4.5% of the total indigenous population.

The other amerindian languages spoken in Ecuador include Awapit (spoken by the Awá), A'ingae (spoken by the Cofan), Achuar Chicham (spoken by the Achuar), Shiwiar (spoken by the Shiwiar), Cha'palaachi (spoken by the Chachi), Tsa'fiki (spoken by the Tsáchila), Paicoca (spoken by the Siona and Secoya), and Wao Tededeo (spoken by the Waorani). Though most features of Ecuadorian Spanish are those universal to the Spanish-speaking world, there are several idiosyncrasies.

=== Religion ===
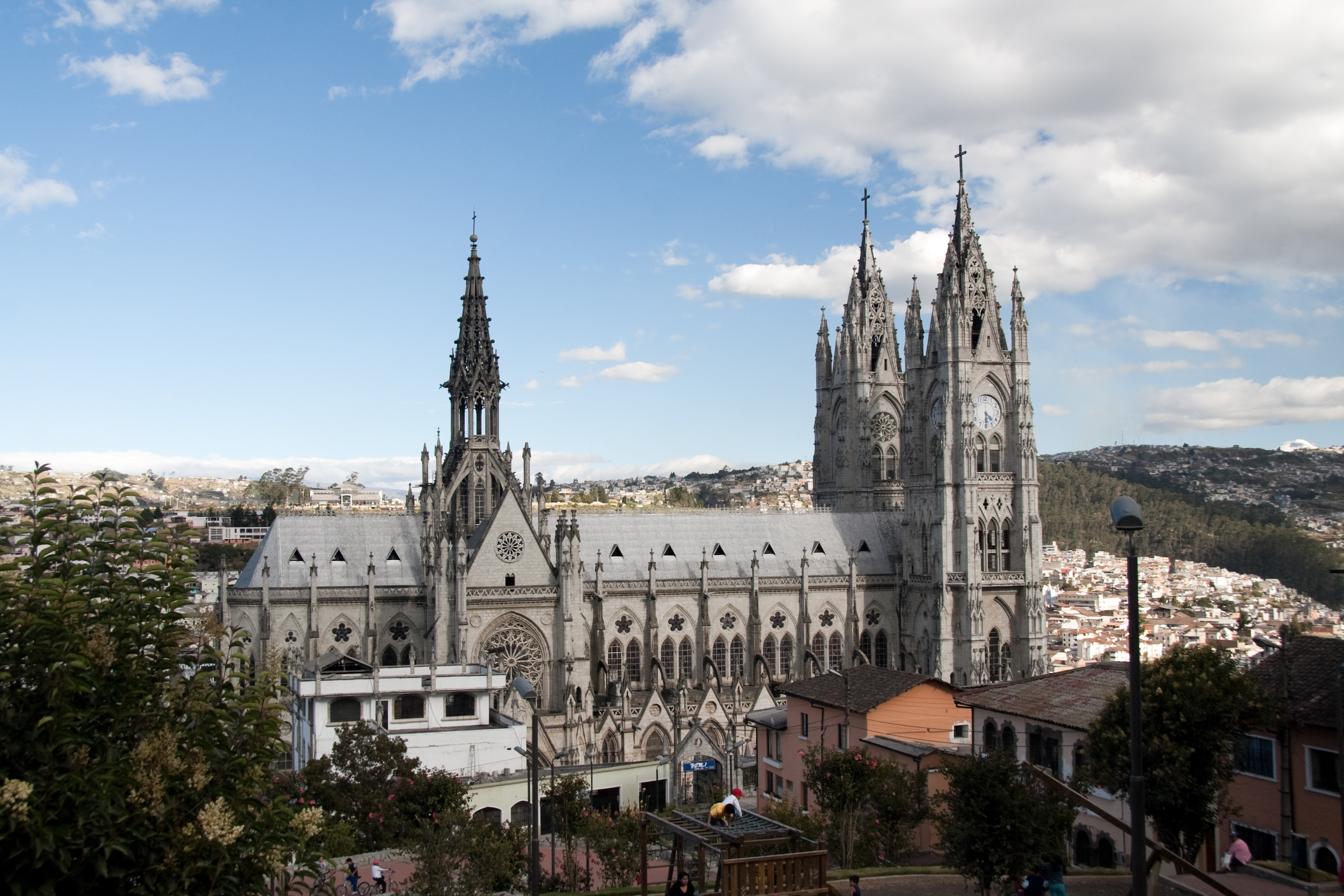
Basilica of the National Vow in Quito

According to the Ecuadorian National Institute of Statistics and Census, 91.95% of the country's population have a religion, 7.94% are atheists and 0.11% are agnostics. Among those with a religion, 80.44% are Roman Catholic, 11.30% are Protestants, and 8.26% other (mainly Jewish, Buddhists and Latter-day Saints).

In the rural parts of Ecuador, indigenous beliefs and Catholicism are sometimes syncretized. Most festivals and annual parades are based on religious celebrations, many incorporating a mixture of rites and icons.

There is a small number of Eastern Orthodox Christians, indigenous religions, Muslims (see Islam in Ecuador), Buddhists and Baháʼís. There are about 185,000 members of the Church of Jesus Christ of Latter-day Saints (LDS Church), and over 80,000 Jehovah's Witnesses in the country.

The "Jewish Community of Ecuador" (Comunidad Judía del Ecuador) has its seat in Quito and has approximately 300 members. Nevertheless, this number is declining because young people leave the country towards the United States of America or Israel. The Community has a Jewish Center with a synagogue, a country club and a cemetery. It supports the "Albert Einstein School", where Jewish history, religion and Hebrew classes are offered. Since 2004, there has also been a Chabad house in Quito.

There are very small communities in Cuenca and Ambato. The "Comunidad de Culto Israelita" reunites the Jews of Guayaquil. This community works independently from the "Jewish Community of Ecuador". Jewish visitors to Ecuador can also take advantage of Jewish resources as they travel and keep kosher there, even in the Amazon rainforest. The city has also synagogue of Messianic Judaism.

=== Music ===
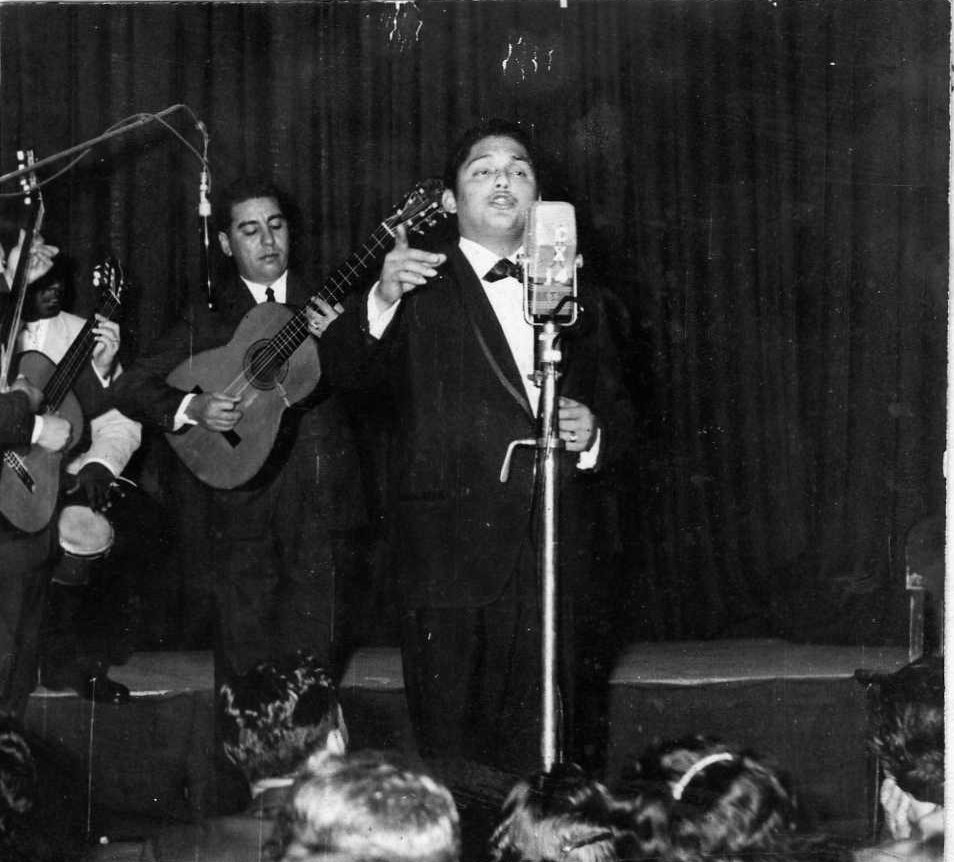
Julio Jaramillo is an icon of music.

Ecuador also has a tradition in music that started during the colonial times with the Catholic music. In colonial Ecuador, musical compositions were primarily tied to the Catholic liturgical calendar, encompassing genres like villancicos, romances, and chanzonetas. Villancicos, initially confined to Advent and Christmas, gained prominence for their evangelizing potential due to their Spanish lyrics, leading to a unique musical development not seen in Europe. These compositions evolved in complexity, often featuring 8 to 12 voices, with notable examples from Fray Fernando de Jesús Larrea and Fray Manuel Almeida. Romances, originating from Spanish Renaissance popular poetry, were polyphonic and vocal, typically epic octosyllabic poems performed during the Maitín (pre-dawn office), influencing later genres like the albazo. Chanzonetas, derived from French chansons, were also polyphonic pieces, often religiously themed in Hispanoamerica, and while sometimes confused with villancicos, they were primarily associated with December performances. Beyond these, Afro-Ecuadorian and Montuvio traditions developed the chigualo, a funerary or Christmas celebration with joyous singing and dancing, and the arrullo, a song accompanied by instruments like the marimba, expressing both religious devotion and Afro-Ecuadorian cosmology. Cathedral and monastic ensembles, with their structured roles for authorities, instrumentalists, singers, and support staff, played a crucial role in performing these compositions, often duplicating vocal parts with instruments like chirimías and sacabuches, and utilizing polyphonic techniques in works such as Gonzalo Pillajo's "Al Rey más inmenso, al Dios más humano."

After the independence, in 1870 the founding of the National Conservatory of Music was an important step in the consolidation of this genre. This institution was led by Antonio Neumane, who composed the National Anthem's melody. This period marked the formal, secular establishment of classical music, leading to the emergence of the pasillo, a quintessential Ecuadorian genre, by composers like Carlos Amable Ortiz, and the construction of the Teatro Nacional Sucre. The Conservatory fostered generations of musicians, including those mentored by Sixto María Durán, and spurred significant musicological research by figures like Pedro Traversari and Segundo Luis Moreno, who documented Ecuador's rich musical heritage, including coastal genres. From early instrumental pieces, the pasillo evolved into a popular form, influenced by both classical composers and the lyrical contributions of the "Generación Decapitada" poets. The Leading figure however is Luis H. Salgado, with his symphonies and operas that gained relevance in the 20th Century. After Salgado, contemporary composers and conductors like Gerardo Guevara, Cristian Orozco, Álvaro Manzano , continue to shape Ecuador's musical tradition.

The music of Ecuador has a long history. Pasillo is a genre shared by former Gran Colombia countries (Panamá, Colombia, Venezuela and Ecuador) that gained popularity during the wars of independence. In Ecuador it is the "national genre of music" and was included in the Unesco intangible cultural heritage list. Through the years, many cultures have influenced to establish new types of music. There are also different kinds of traditional music like Marimba, considered also in the Unesco intangible cultural heritage list. After that follows the albazo, pasacalle, bomba highly established in afro-Ecuadorian society of the northern andes in the Chota Valley the Sanjuanito. It popularized in the North of Ecuador (Otavalo-Imbabura) although it is also part of the marimba genre under the name "Sanjuanito negro". Besides that Cumbia, Salsa, and Rock are very popular with a lot of influential bands in the local scene and music festivals like Quito Fest, Pululahua, Rock desde el Volcán, Al Sur del Cielo.

=== Cuisine ===
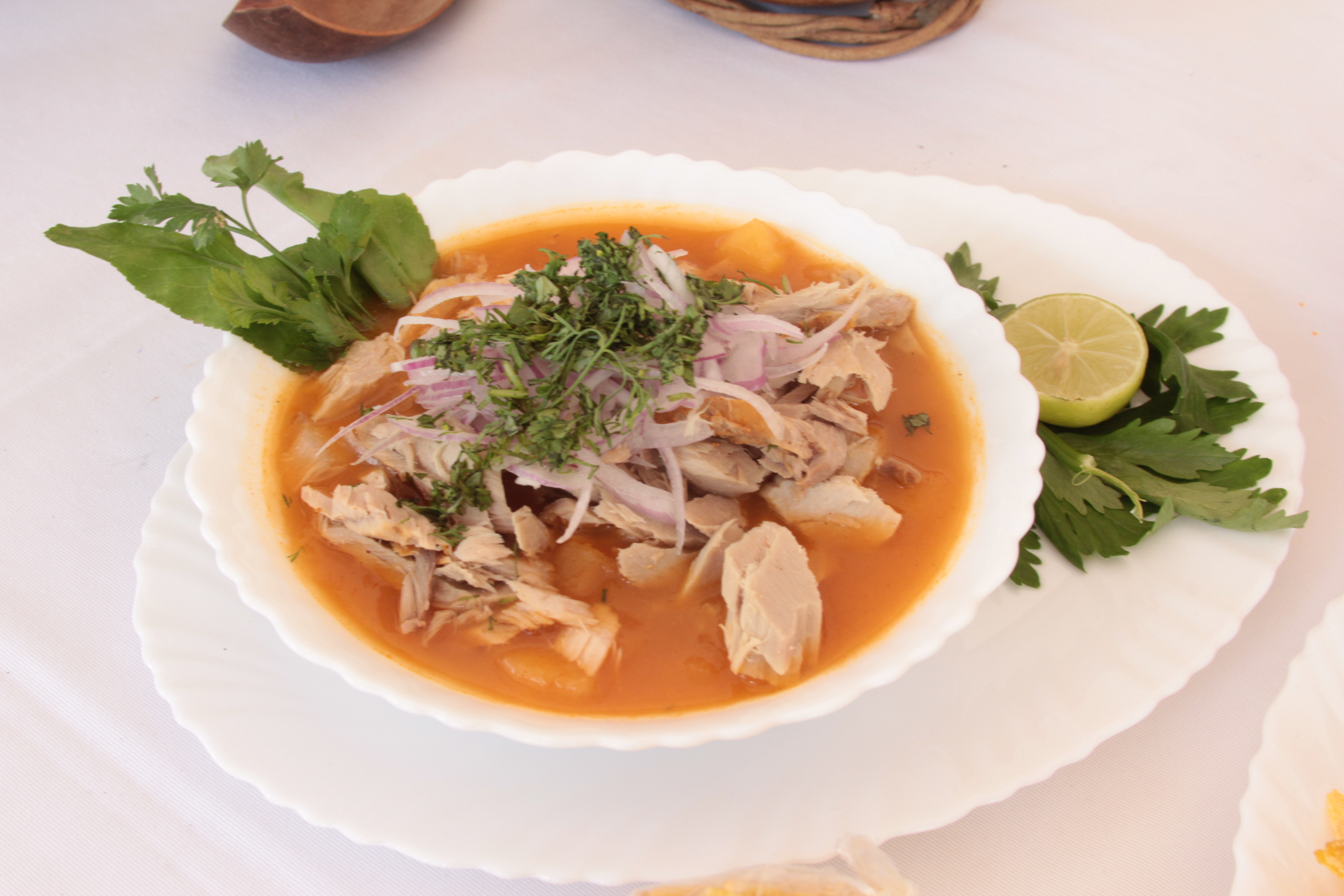
Encebollado

Ecuadorian cuisine is diverse, varying with the altitude and associated agricultural conditions. Most regions in Ecuador follow the traditional three course meal of soup, a second course which includes rice and a protein such as meat or fish, and then dessert and coffee to finish. Supper is usually lighter, and sometimes consists only of coffee or herbal tea with bread.

In the coastal region, seafood is very popular, with fish, shrimp, encebollado and ceviche being key parts of the diet. Generally, ceviches are served with fried plantain (chifles y patacones), popcorn or tostado. Plantain- and peanut-based dishes are the basis of most coastal meals. Encocados (dishes that contain a coconut sauce) are also very popular. Churrasco is a staple food of the coastal region, especially Guayaquil. Arroz con menestra y carne asada (rice with beans and grilled beef) is one of the traditional dishes of Guayaquil, as is fried plantain which is often served with it. This region is a leading producer of bananas, cacao beans (to make chocolate), shrimp, tilapia, mangos and passion fruit, among other products.

In the highland region, pork, chicken, beef, and cuy (guinea pig) are popular and are served with a variety of grains (especially rice and corn) or potatoes.

In the Amazon region, a dietary staple is the yuca, elsewhere called cassava. Many fruits are available in this region, including bananas, tree grapes, and peach palms.

=== Literature ===
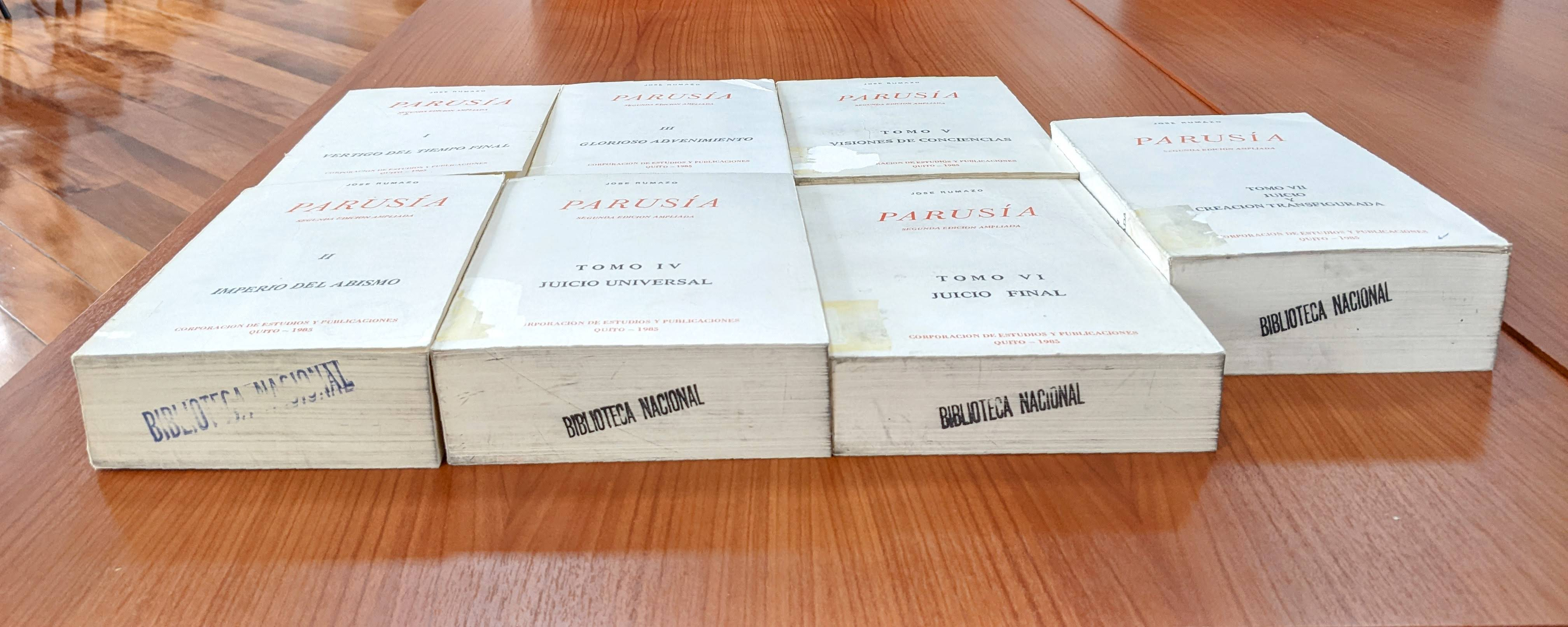
Parusía the religious epic poem written by José Rumazo

Early literature in colonial Ecuador, as in the rest of Spanish America, was influenced by the Spanish Golden Age. The earliest known poem written in the territory now known as Ecuador is "Los actos y hazañas valerosas del capitán Diego Hernández de Serpa" by Pedro de la Cadena, composed between 1563 and 1564. This work is also considered the first Venezuelan poem due to its theme, narrating the conquest and colonization of Cubagua Island by Hernández de Serpa. Pedro de la Cadena's life was closely tied to the Royal Audience of Quito, which was established at the same time his poem was written. Later, in 1583, he was appointed Captain General of the recently founded city of Loja. Towards the end of the 16th century, Teresa de Cepeda y Fuentes (1566-1610), niece of Saint Teresa of Ávila, authored the "Coplas a lo divino" around 1600. These religious poems are considered the first written by someone born in what is now Ecuadorian territory and were rediscovered and publicized by Father Aurelio Espinosa Pólit in 1959. During the second half of the 17th century, under the Royal Audience of Quito, literary expressions began to emerge. Figures of this era include Gaspar de Villarroel, who pioneered prose with his essayistic work "Gobierno Eclesiástico Pacífico," and Antonio de Bastidas, recognized by Espinosa Pólit as Ecuador's first poet.

Antonio de Bastidas, along with his disciple Jacinto de Evia, contributed many poems to the "Ramillete de varias flores poéticas" a collection published in Spain that showcased a culteranismo style, heavily influenced by Góngora. Additionally, the "Elegía a la muerte de Atahualpa" is a significant poem attributed to Jacinto Collahuazo, an indigenous leader from near Ibarra. Other early Ecuadorian writers include the Jesuits Juan Bautista Aguirre, born in Daule in 1725, and Father Juan de Velasco, born in Riobamba in 1727. De Velasco wrote about the nations and chiefdoms that had existed in the Kingdom of Quito (today Ecuador) before the arrival of the Spanish. His historical accounts are nationalistic, featuring a romantic perspective of precolonial history.

Famous authors from the late colonial and early republic period include: Eugenio Espejo a printer and main author of the first newspaper in Ecuadorian colonial times; Jose Joaquin de Olmedo (born in Guayaquil), famous for his ode to Simón Bolívar titled La Victoria de Junin; Juan Montalvo, a prominent essayist and novelist; Juan Leon Mera, famous for his work "Cumanda" or "Tragedy among Savages" and the Ecuadorian National Anthem; the romantic poets Dolores Veintimilla, Numa Pompilio Llona and Julio Zaldumbide; the novelists Luis A. Martínez with A la Costa, and Juan Montalvo with Capítulos que se le olvidaron an Cervantes.

Contemporary Ecuadorian writers include the poet José Rumazo González author of the seven volume epic poem called Parusía. Additionally important writers include the poet Jorge Carrera Andrade; the essayist Benjamín Carrión; the poets Medardo Angel Silva; the novelist Enrique Gil Gilbert; the novelists Jorge Icaza, Adalberto Ortiz and Nelson Estupiñán Bass, the short story author Pablo Palacio; the novelist Alicia Yanez Cossio; U.S. based Ecuadorian poet Emanuel Xavier.

=== Art ===
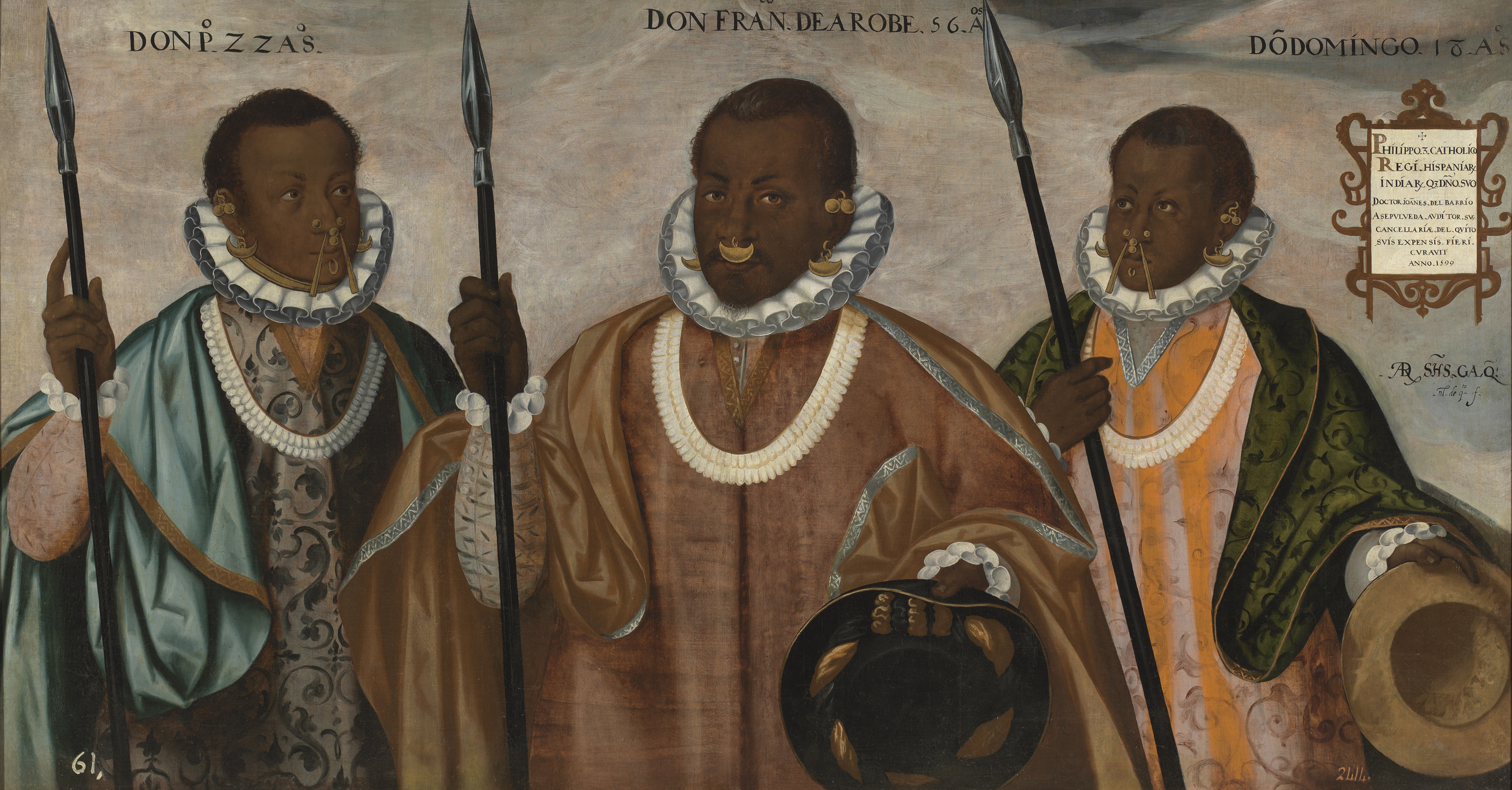
The Mulattos of Esmeraldas by Andrés Sánchez Gallque

The best known art styles from Ecuador belonged to the Escuela Quiteña, which developed from the 16th to 18th centuries, examples of which are on display in various old churches in Quito. The main painters and sculptors are Pedro Bedón, Andrés Sánchez Gallque, Diego de Robles, José Olmos (Pampite), Hernando de la Cruz, Miguel de Santiago, Isabel de Santiago, Nicolás Javier Goríbar, Bernardo de Legarda, Manuel Chili (Caspicara), Manuel de Samaniego, Vicente Albán, María Estefanía Dávalos y Maldonado.

Contemporary Ecuadorian painters include: Eduardo Kingman, Oswaldo Guayasamín and Camilo Egas from the realist expressionist Movement; Manuel Rendón, Jaime Zapata, Enrique Tábara, Aníbal Villacís, Theo Constante, León Ricaurte and Estuardo Maldonado from the Informalist Movement; and Luis Burgos Flor with his abstract, Futuristic style. .

=== Sport ===
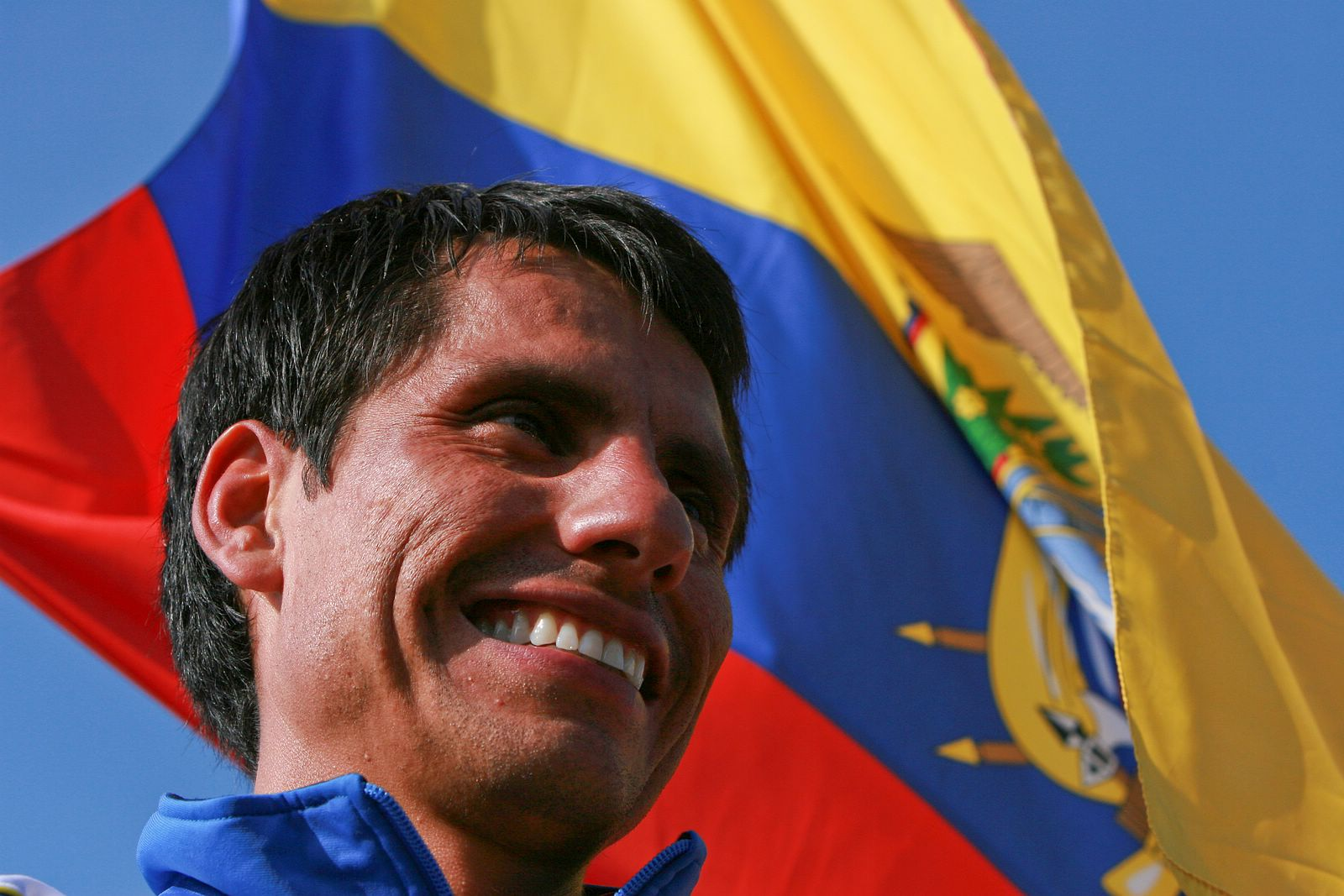
Jefferson Pérez, Olympian gold medalist

The most popular sport in Ecuador, as in most South American countries, is football (soccer). Its best known professional teams include Barcelona and Emelec from Guayaquil; LDU Quito, Deportivo Quito, and El Nacional from Quito; Olmedo from Riobamba; and Deportivo Cuenca from Cuenca. Currently the most successful football club in Ecuador is LDU Quito, and it is the only Ecuadorian club that have won the Copa Libertadores, the Copa Sudamericana and the Recopa Sudamericana; they were also runners-up in the 2008 FIFA Club World Cup. The matches of the Ecuador national team are the most-watched sporting events in the country. Ecuador qualified for the final rounds of the 2002, 2006, and 2014 FIFA World Cups. The 2002 FIFA World Cup qualifying campaign was considered a huge success for the country and its inhabitants. Ecuador finished in 2nd place on the qualifiers behind Argentina and above the team that would become World Champion, Brazil. In the 2006 FIFA World Cup, Ecuador finished ahead of Poland and Costa Rica to come in second to Germany in Group A in the 2006 World Cup. Futsal, often referred to as índor, is particularly popular for mass participation.

There is considerable interest in tennis in the middle and upper classes of Ecuadorian society, and several Ecuadorian professional players have attained international fame. Basketball has a high profile, while Ecuador's specialties include Ecuavolley, a three-person variation of volleyball. Bullfighting is practiced at a professional level in Quito, during the annual festivities that commemorate the Spanish founding of the city, and it also features in festivals in many smaller towns. Rugby union is found to some extent in Ecuador, with teams in Guayaquil, Quito and Cuenca.

Ecuador has won three medals in the Olympic Games. 20 km racewalker Jefferson Pérez took gold in the 1996 games, and silver 12 years later. Pérez also set a world best in the 2003 World Championships of 1:17:21 for the 20 km distance. Cyclist Richard Carapaz, the winner of 2019 Giro d'Italia, won a gold medal at the road cycling race of the 2020 Summer Olympics.
