= Veintimilla =

Veintimilla is a surname. Notable people with the surname include:

- Dolores Veintimilla (1829–1857) Ecuadorian poet
- Michelle Veintimilla (born 1992), Ecuadorian American actress
