= José Rumazo González =

Ecuadorian writer, philosopher and historian

José Rumazo González Moya
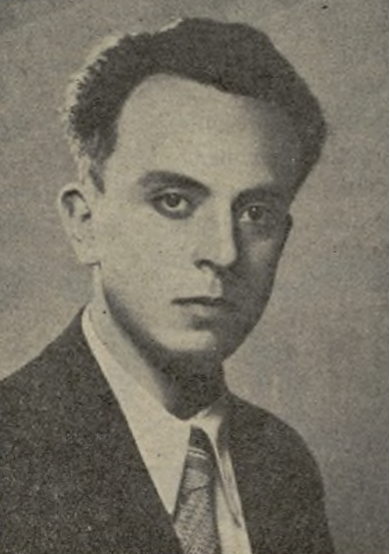
- Born: August 28, 1904; Latacunga, Ecuador
- Died: February 26, 1995 (aged 90); Quito, Ecuador
- Resting place: Ecuador
- Occupations: Poet, historian, ambassador
- Spouse: Eugenia Arcos Proaño
- Children: José Rumazo Arcos
- Relatives: José Rumazo González (father), Carmen Moya Puyol (mother)
- Writing career
- Language: Spanish
- Genre: Poetry
- Notable work: Parusia
- Literary movement: Epic

José Rumazo González (August 28, 1904 – February 26, 1995) was an Ecuadorian writer, philosopher and historian.

He is the author of the celebrated poem "Parusia", an epic poem that he began writing in 1956 and consists of 5,600 pages in 7 volumes; it contains close to 240,000 verses, which makes it one of the longest epic poems in human history; it is longer than the Mahabharata by Vyasa, the Ramayana by Valmiki, the Iliad and Odyssey by Homer, and the Aeneid by Virgil.

He served as consul in Seville, Cadiz, Lisbon and Barcelona, and he was ambassador in Honduras, Argentina, Uruguay y Panama. He taught History and Castilian at the Eloy Alfaro Military School, and History and Superior Grammar in the Catholic University of Quito. He also was a member of the Ecuadorian Academy of Language, the Ecuadorian Academy of History, the Academies of History of Bogotá and Madrid, the Ecuadorian House of Culture, the Bolivarian Society, and other institutions. Finally, he was awarded the National Order of Merit (Orden Nacional al Mérito) (1976), and the National Prize in Literature "Premio Eugenio Espejo" in 1987.

== Biography ==
=== Origins ===
José Rumazo González was born on August 28, 1904, in Latacunga, Ecuador. His mother died shortly after his birth, an event that shaped his life and strengthened the influence of his father, a liberally oriented man and friend of Juan Montalvo. His father's passion for science and culture, including the publication of books by Ecuadorian authors, sparked an interest in literature in José and his brother Alfonso, leading them to found the "Biblioteca Ecuatoriana" (Ecuadorian Library).

=== Historian and ambassador ===
His historical work, influenced by the anthropological and archaeological discoveries of his time, is clearly evident in "Ecuador en la América Prehispánica" (Ecuador in Pre-Hispanic America), where he examines theories about the first peoples, the pre-Inca cultures, and the Inca Empire in Ecuadorian territory. Furthermore, the City Council of Quito commissioned him to decipher and publish the Libros del Cabildo (Books of the Council), the founding documents of the city spanning from 1534 to 1551, a work on which he collaborated with other researchers.

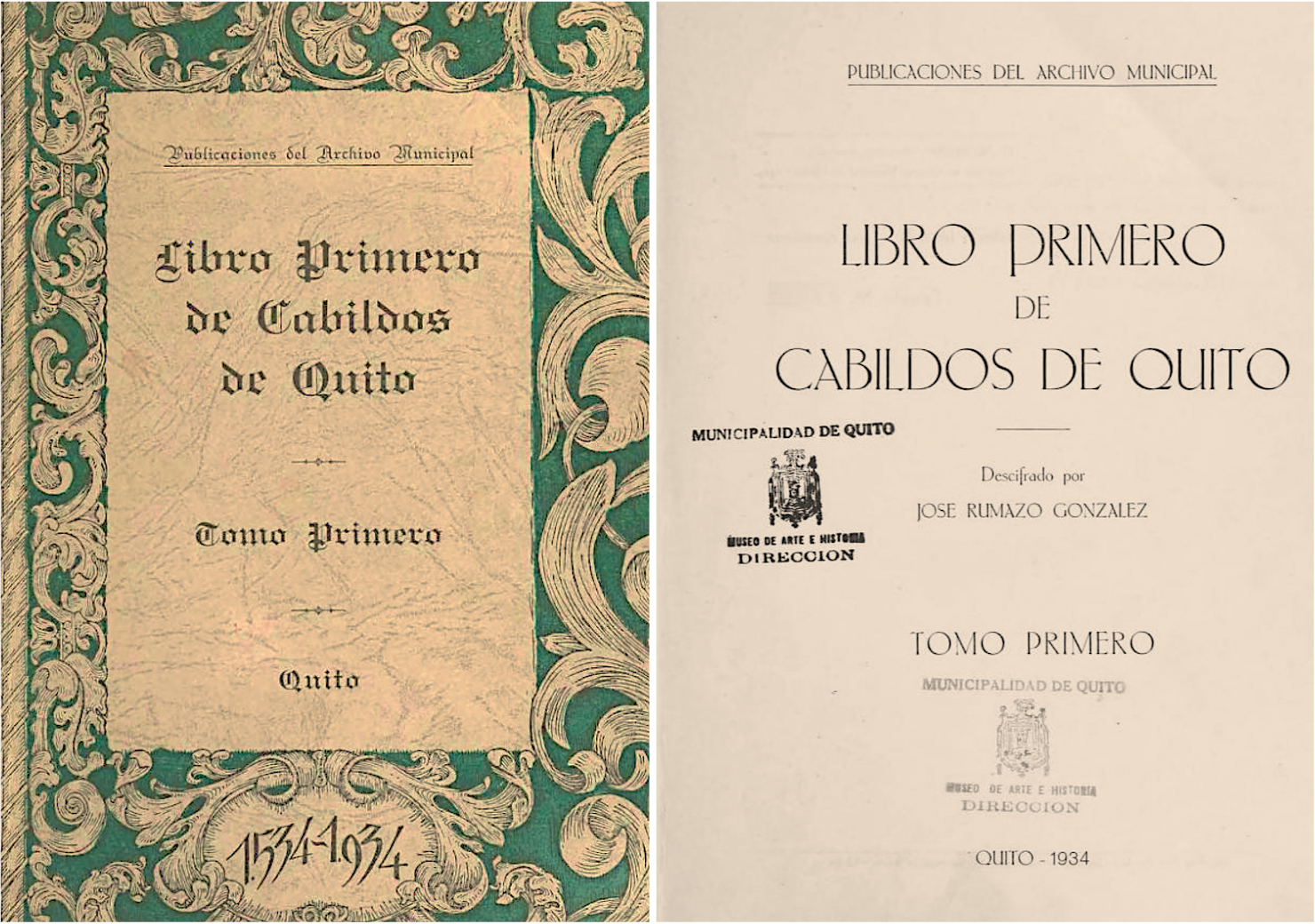
Cover and title page of the First Book of Council Records of Quito, also known as the "Green Book," where the foundational acts of the city of San Francisco de Quito are found and which was deciphered by the paleographer José Rumazo González.

In his pursuit of knowledge, Rumazo González traveled to Europe in 1939 to study the philosophy of history in Germany, but the outbreak of World War II thwarted his plans. He settled in Seville, where, thanks to a grant from the National Congress, he began significant work on the compilation and digitization of documents from the Archivo General de Indias (General Archive of the Indies). During his stay in Spain, he discovered and published the will of Sebastián de Belalcázar and gained recognition in Ecuador and Colombia. This work was part of the Ecuadorian "Misiones Especiales" (Special Missions) to collect historical documents to support the country's territorial integrity. Parallel to his research, Rumazo González pursued a distinguished diplomatic career, holding consular posts in Seville, Cádiz, Lisbon, and Barcelona between 1934 and 1947. Subsequently, he served as Chargé d'Affaires and Minister Counsellor in Spain and represented Ecuador at various international congresses. In his country's Ministry of Foreign Affairs, he held high leadership positions and became Acting Undersecretary. The final stage of his diplomatic career led him as ambassador to Honduras, Argentina, Uruguay, and Panama, and he participated in numerous special missions and held high offices in the Ministry.

As a result of his historiographical work, a book published in eight volumes between 1948 and 1950 in Madrid was born, titled "Documents for the History of the Audiencia de Quito. Pedro Vicente Maldonado," which compiles information about the important 18th-century scientist. This publication would be the beginning of a total of one hundred and eighty volumes, each of approximately 500 pages, containing historical documents that he had microfilmed in the Archive of the Indies together with his wife Eugenia Arcos Proaño.[ After the publication of the Documents, the Spanish scientist Gregorio Marañón referred to them, saying: "Allow me to praise this publication, a true monument, indispensable not only for the History of Ecuador but also for that of Spain." For this publication, he was also highlighted along with Jorge A. Garces and Julio Estrada Ycaza as being considered an important researcher, and his documentary collections were described as "crucial" for understanding the history of colonial Ecuador. Additionally, his studies on the Amazon River served Jorge Carrera Andrade for his historical essays, which would be published translated into French under the title "Portrait culturel de l'Équateur".

=== Literary works ===
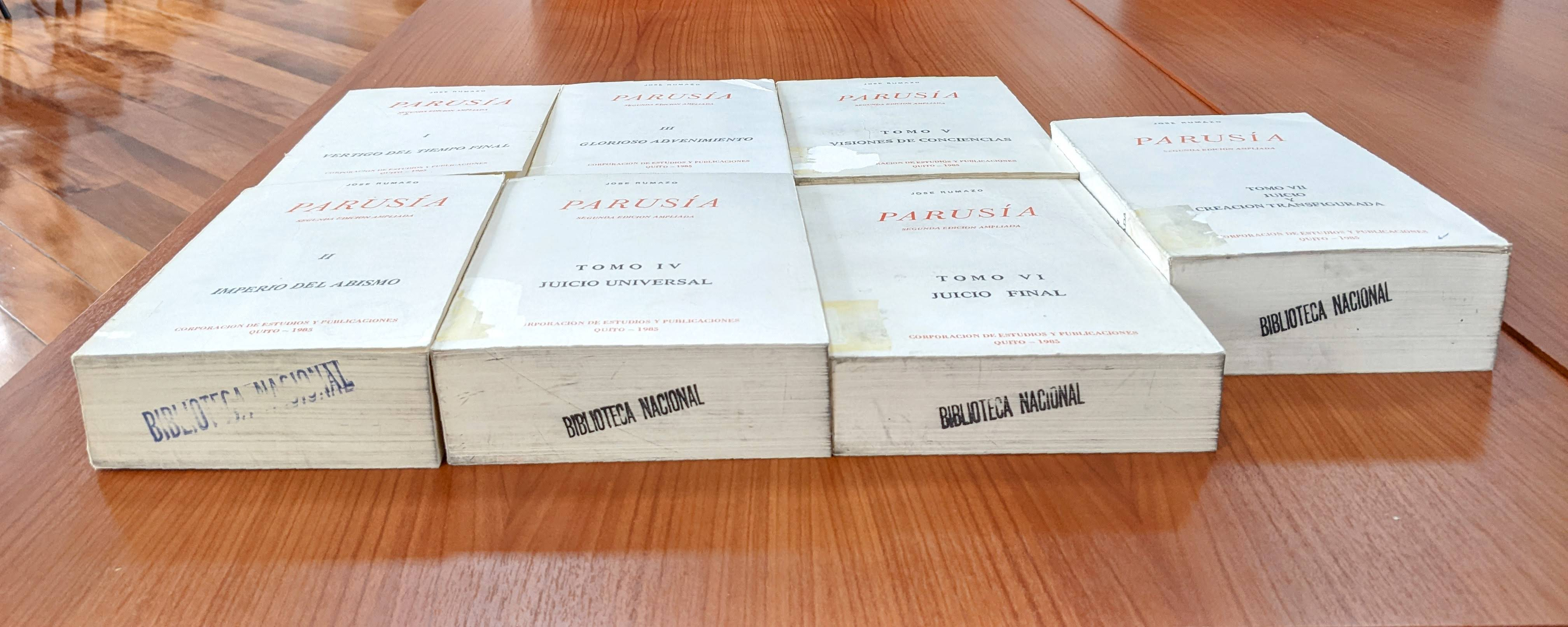
Parusía

His productive literary work began with avant-garde poetry, influenced by authors such as Vicente Huidobro, which explored "Anfimetamorphism" or the double meaning of the word. However, this early phase did not find the same resonance as the socialist realism prevalent at the time. Later, he turned to art criticism and published dramas with historical themes such as "Sevilla del oro y La leyenda del cacique dorado" (Seville of Gold and The Legend of the Golden Cacique), as well as collections of poems such as "Raudal" (Torrent), "Soledades de la sangre" (Solitudes of Blood), and "El amor soñado en la muerte" (The Dreamed Love in Death), and the novel "Andariegos" (Wanderers), which explores the psychology of the characters.

His epic poem "Parusía" would be published in three editions, in 1960, 1972, and 1985. According to his own testimony, he never thought the poem would be so long. When he began writing it in Honduras, he dedicated one or two hours daily after attending to everything related to his work as ambassador. However, he later continued writing until the first edition was completed in four volumes in 1972. By then, he presented it to close people to read, such as Father Juan Larrea Holguín. This publication already caused astonishment due to its "density, depth, and spirit." The first edition of four volumes had about 135 thousand hendecasyllables and was already considered "the most extensive epic that has been attempted in Spanish-language literature." Furthermore, it was included in volume one of the "International Christian Literature Documentation Project" as an important example of eschatological epic poetry. Nevertheless, he felt the need to continue it, which would materialize in the second expanded edition in seven volumes with about 240 thousand hendecasyllables, published in 1985 and dedicated to Pope John Paul II during his visit to Ecuador, where he would also bless the Basilica of the National Vow, a symbol of Ecuador's consecration to the Sacred Heart. However, the feeling that the work was not finished remained present. In his words, "When I finished the last verse, I felt the sensation that not everything was written: there are always insecurities and longings." Two years later, in 1987, he would be worthy of the Eugenio Espejo National Prize in the "Literature" category. This prize is the highest award in his country. For his work, he would be considered the "Dante Alighieri of Ecuador" and also "A worthy emulator of Homer, Virgil, and Dante." Rumazo saw himself as a continuer of the tradition of Christian epic poetry, following the work "Paradise Lost" by John Milton. In his words:

If in Revelation there exist two extremes: Genesis and Revelation (Apocalypse), and if the former has already been sung by Milton, the possibility remains for the poet to sing the final act, referring with it to all of humanity, even to what has not yet occurred but is recorded in the prophecies.

== Works ==
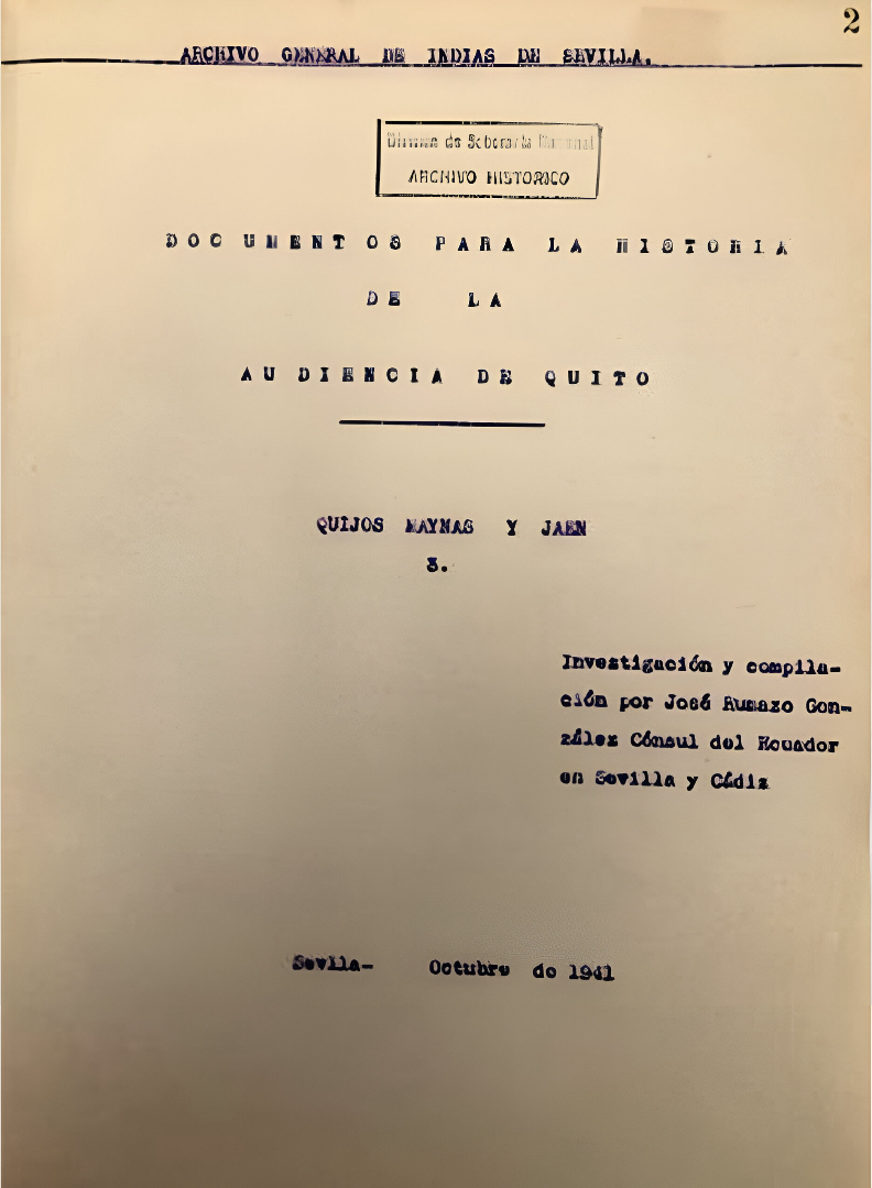
Documentos para la historia de le Audiencia de Quito, compilation made by José Rumazo González in Spain

=== History ===
- 1933: El Ecuador en la América Prehispánica, 284 pp.
- 1934: Libros Primero y Segundo del Cabildo de Quito 535 pp. y 404 pp.
- 1943: Llegada de la misión geodésica francesa al Ecuador, 10 pp.
- 1945: Guayaquil alrededor de 1809, 32 pp.
- 1946: La región amazónica del Ecuador en el siglo XVI, 311 pp.
- 1958: Documentos para la Historia de la Audiencia de Quito. Maldonado, 8 vol.
- 1960: Maldonado, Prosistas de la colonia, Biblioteca Ecuatoriana Mínima, 50 pp.

=== Poetry ===
- 1930: Proa, 227 pp.
- 1932: Altamar, 198 pp.
- 1949: Raudal, 129 pp.
- 1950: Soledades de la sangre, 64 pp.
- 1950: El amor soñado en la muerte, 101 pp.
- 1960, 1972, 1985: Parusía, el glorioso advenimiento, 7134 pp.
- 1987: Ecos del silencio, 774 pp.
- 1989: Claridades en vislumbres, 407 pp.
- 1991: Hacia lo inefable, 332 pp.

=== Prose ===
- 1932: El nuevo clasicismo en la poesía, (essay), 41 pp.
- 1934: Aragón, Sacristán y Anselmo, (short stories), 44 pp.
- 1937: Víctor Mideros, (essay) 46 pp.
- 1956: Andariegos, (novel) 607 pp.
- 1958: Sevilla del oro y La leyenda del cacique dorado, (drama) 123 pp.
- 1988: Sendas y encuentros, (essays) 1138 pp.
