= Jaime Zapata (disambiguation) =

Jaime Zapata (1978 –2011) was a U.S. ICE agent, killed in Mexico.

Jaime Zapata may also refer to:

- Jaime Zapata (painter) (born 1957), Ecuadorian painter
- Jaime Zapata (footballer) (born 1959), Chilean football manager and player
- Jaime Zapata (Labor Department spokesman) (born 1962), American businessman and former U.S. Department of Labor official
