= Siete tratados =

Novel by Juan Montalvo

- Volume I
- Author: Juan Montalvo
- Language: Spanish
- Genre: Essays
- Publication date: 1882 - 1883
- Publication place: Ecuador
- ISBN: 978-1018723143

Siete tratados (in English: Seven Treatises) is a collection of essays published by the Ecuadorian writer Juan Montalvo in two volumes, in 1882 and 1883, respectively. Of a marked philosophical character, it was his most famous work, thanks to which he received praise both in America and in Europe. For the most part, it was written between 1873 and 1875, while its author was outlawed in Ipiales, since, during that period, Gabriel García Moreno, his enemy who was known for repressing any attempt at opposition, governed Ecuador. It was published in Paris, with volume I being published in 1882, and volume II, in 1883.

The novel is written with such an abundance of historical quotations, parables, and examples, that reading it is not easy: the reader may lose interest in the work because of the author's waste of erudition and his digressions, which are not always accurate.

Volume I contains: "On Nobility", "On Beauty in the Human Race" and "Reply to a Pseudo-Catholic Sophist" (in Spanish: “De la nobleza”, “De la belleza en el género humano” and “Réplica a un sofista seudocatólico”). Volume II contains: "On Genius", "The Heroes of the Emancipation of the Spanish-American Race", "The Banquets of the Philosophers" and "El buscapié" (in Spanish: “Del genio”, “Los héroes de la emancipación hispanoamericana”, “Los banquetes de los filósofos” and “El buscapié”), the latter of which later appeared as a prologue to Montalvo's novel Capítulos que se le olvidaron a Cervantes.

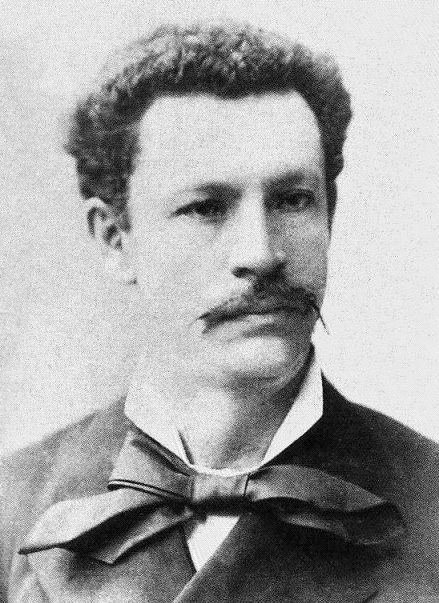
Juan Montalvo

== Content ==
=== On Nobility (De la nobleza) ===
Montalvo begins this treatise by affirming that, although all human races have great differences, their origin is unique. He takes Montesquieu and his study on the climatological influence on the development of the distinctive features of races as a reference, although he does not agree with his criterion that all racial differences are caused, simply, by changes in climate. This serves as an introduction to his study on nobility:

If the unique origin of the human species is in controversy, there would be nothing to hinder the inequality of the classes, and the nobility of blood would become a natural and essential prerogative of those who claim it and possess it with a just title. If we admit, however, a single birth for all mortals, the principle of nobility must be sought elsewhere.

He then goes on to study different notions of nobility throughout history. He begins by referring to “the founders of the first nobility of the world”, that is to say those whom “the flight of intelligence and the strength of the heart raised them to the first step on that high step that men have built to set themselves above others”, although he then notes that nobility comes from the plebs and returns to them, so he asks a rhetorical question: “How many descendants of kings today make up the dregs of the people in the nations of the earth?" He mentions that certain nobles had humble origins, as in the case of Themistocles in Athens and Camillus in Rome. He then states, “nobility, then, has noble origins, as born of talent and courage, the garments of human nature”. He then refers to the fact that nobility is sometimes based on wealth:

In our times, riches are the foundation of nobility: the world has passed through the tail of a comet and has lost its sight: now we do not see as the ancients saw, those venerable patriarchs who rode on asses and walked barefoot.

And he exclaims: “Ah, if only the rich were corrupted by wealth!" According to Montalvo, nobility can be acquired, and it can be lost in the same case: “Anyone who incurs in a case of less worth degrades his blood: the infamous cannot be noble. There is also incompatibility between lordship and dignity. Those who begin their enrichment with despicable lucre, dishonest income, are not and cannot be nobles."

In short, for Montalvo, true nobility, dignified nobility, the nobility that should be admired, praised, and distinguished, is born of the human being and not with the human being; it is made, not inherited. According to his own words: “On these considerations was founded, no doubt, the wisest of the sects of philosophy, which was that of the Stoics, to establish this principle: There is no nobility but that of the virtues.”

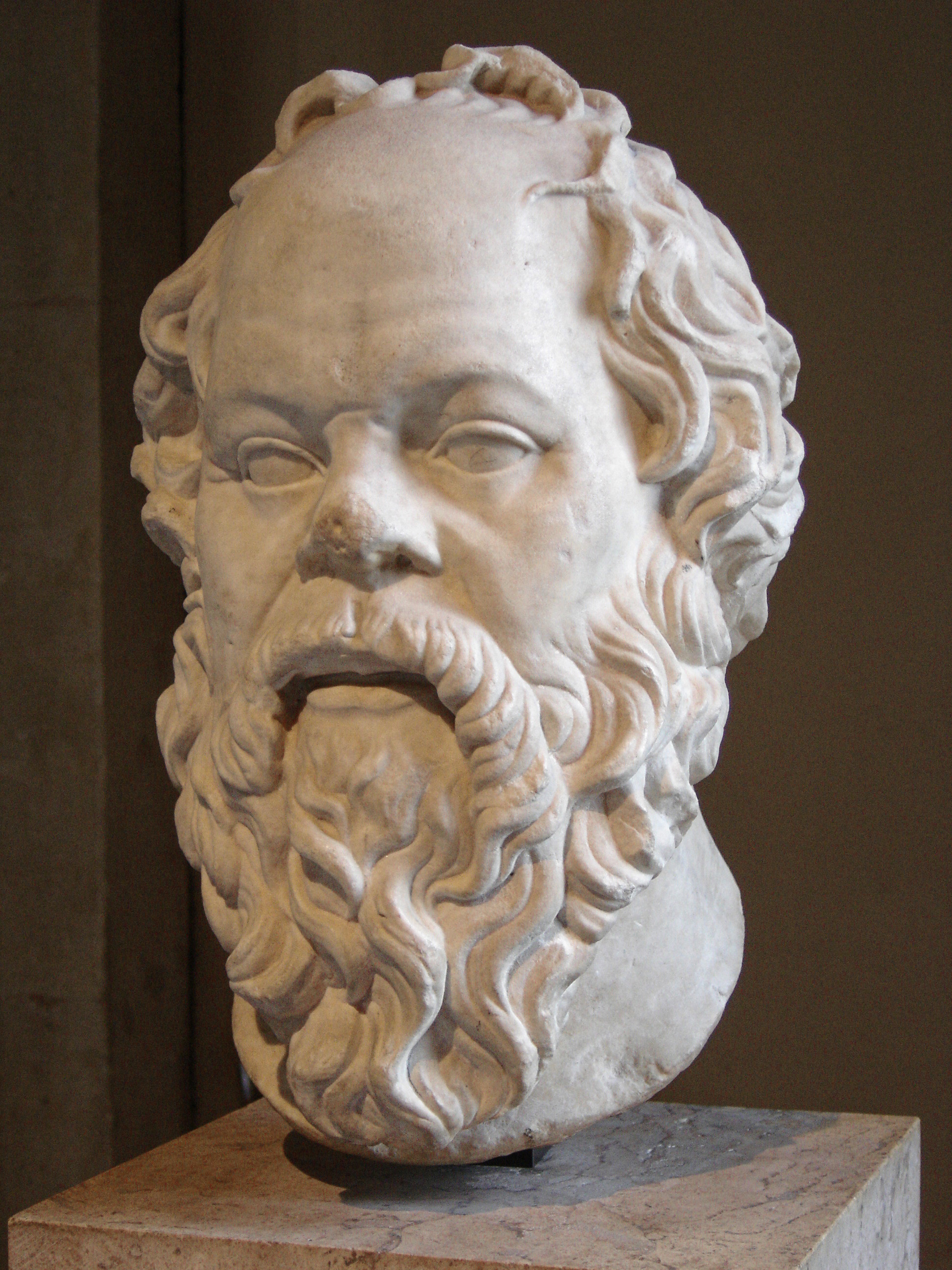
“I know very well that Socrates has passed down to us as much by wisdom as by ugliness; but it is not hidden from me that this ugly man is the most beautiful of men. The divine spirit, burning in him like a flame within a vessel of coarse workmanship, but of noble matter, transfigures him and presents him to the eyes of astonished mortals as a Genius superior to the beings that populate the earth."

=== On Beauty in the Human Race (De la belleza en el género humano) ===
He begins this treatise by stating that it is impossible to define beauty: “Material beauty is that which sympathizes the eyes and fills the heart, we might say; but these are effects of beauty, and not beauty itself.” He then analyzes its relativity: each people, each race, each historical epoch and even each age has its model of beauty.

On the other hand, for Montalvo, there cannot be beauty without virtue: “Unfortunately, beauty is not the sister of virtue, not even of goodness. If it were not to put an impious blemish, I would be able to affirm that it would have been better if, without virtue, we did not recognize beauty of any lineage."

To conclude, in his opinion beauty is not only material; for the believing soul, for the spirit that longs for perfection, there is the beauty of God. This treatise, because of the metaphors and descriptions it contains, is perhaps the most artistically accomplished of all.

=== Reply to a Pseudo-Catholic Sophist (Réplica a un sofista seudocatólico) ===
In book number 1 of his magazine El Cosmopolita, Montalvo, commenting on his first visit to Rome, made references to the ancient history of the city, presenting it as a model of morality and virtue. This annoyed certain Ecuadorian Catholics, who claimed that virtue only existed within the Catholic religion. Thus, this treatise was written as a defense to the accusations of his detractors, who called him a heretic, anti-Catholic, and anticlerical. In it, Montalvo responds categorically that he is neither heretic, nor anticlerical, but a believer and a denouncer of the bad clergy.

In his opinion, only fanaticism and dullness can put an abyss between ancient and modern virtue, between pagan and Christian virtue: “I am well satisfied that pure and clean virtue, virtue of heaven, is in the Christian law, the law of God; but if the ancient Greeks and Romans practiced a great part of it, shall we say that it was not virtue, because the Redeemer had not yet come into the world?”

Instead of tending to move the world forward, Montalvo notes that, if it were up to him, he would return to the past. In a trope, he tells us that “human society is a ladder” and that “there cannot be a ladder without steps in human society if we suppress social classes, human society cannot exist”. From these judgments, the inability to look into the future and suggest changes is clear: the splendor of the past and the darkness of the present are constant.

Sometimes in this treatise, he refers to the new European social and ideological currents, although he does not elaborate on them, as in the following case:

To blame ancient Rome for the invention of socialism is the same as blaming it for slavery. Socialism, by a mysterious enchainment of ideas and things, has its cradle in despotism, who would believe it; and it could not, by the law of nature, have been born in a people that adored liberty, cultivated it and enjoyed it as its greatest, truest and most present good.

On the subject of the bad clergy, he attacks them as simoniacs and aphrodisiacs, giving an example of what a “good priest” is with the episode of the priest of Santa Engracia. Although the attack is general, the quotations individualize certain members of the clergy who serve as prototypes: the priest who denied burial for the corpse of his brother, and the one who followed with whips certain women who asked him to lower some part of the fees for a burial. In no other treatise or writing is Montalvo more concerned than in this one to reiterate his belief in God and the commandments. He ends the treatise by saying:

I could honor myself in silence with respect to the charge, as gratuitous as it is reckless, of affirming that I am an enemy of Jesus Christ, I who cannot hear his name without a delicate and virtuous shudder of spirit, which transports me as if by magic to the time and life of that heavenly man. Enemies, Jesus Christ does not have them: bad Christians, Catholics of bad faith are the ones who have them.

=== On Genius (Del genio) ===
He begins this treatise by defending himself from the attacks of a language purist who had criticized him for using the Gallicism "genio" when Spanish has the word "ingenio". For Montalvo, there are two different concepts that must be expressed with two different words, and to explain what "genio" is, he recalls that in ancient Greek philosophy, particularly in Aristotelian philosophy, there was the word “entelechy”, the same word that “sometimes means God, sometimes means form: when it is poured by movement, when by abyss: now it is immortality, then it will indicate hell”. He then explains that something similar happens with the word “genio”: “The entelechy of the ancients has today one as heir of the vast, high, deep, unknown and mysterious: this is the 'genio'”.

He asserts that "genio", as a creative force, is not a universal faculty. "Genio" is a very rare gift “with which God improves the predestined of his love”, while “'ingenio' is talent, intelligence distributed”. He says:

"Ingenio" may be modest, humble, and even low: "genio" is sublime, always sublime; and sublimity does not exist without great daring, unanswerable force, irresistible impetus. "Ingenio" is judicious, often timid: its flight does not translimate the space of an apocate sensibility: "genio" is agitated in a kind of celestial dementia, it flaps its wings impetuously and, with its eyes on fire, it shoots up.

Throughout his essay, Montalvo reviews ancient and modern history to cite "genios" and men of "ingenio", both auspicious and unlucky.

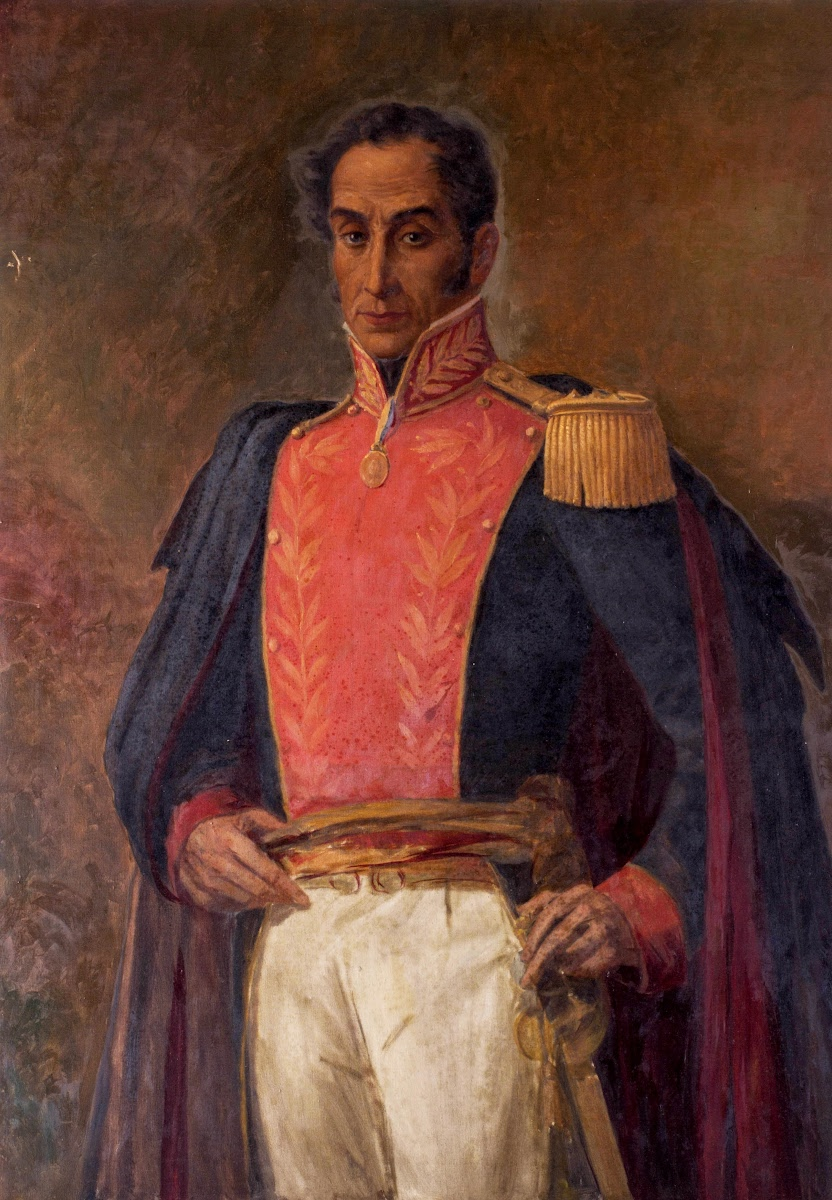
Simón Bolívar

=== The Heroes of the Emancipation of the Spanish-American Race (Los héroes de la emancipación de la raza hispanoamericana) ===
As its name indicates, this treatise is dedicated to exalt the memory of those who fought in the Spanish-American Wars of Independence, especially Simón Bolívar. Montalvo is concerned with giving brilliance to two aspects: the merit of the brave men who fought with courage to see their homelands free, and the importance of a broad and disinterested liberty.

Our joy is to have conquered freedom, but our glory is to have defeated the invincible Spaniards. No, they are not cowards; no, they are not bad soldiers; no, they are not disorderly sheaves of vagabond people: they are the people of Charles the Fifth, king of Spain, emperor of Germany, master of Italy and lord of the New World.

He compares Bolivar with great figures, such as Alexander, Caesar, Aeneas, El Cid, Pyrrhus, Achilles, including Napoleon and Washington, and assures that he is less known because, in the 19th century, the Spanish language occupied a relegated place in European letters, and because Bolivar did not have the bards that praised Napoleon's work.

=== The Banquets of the Philosophers (Los banquetes de los filósofos) ===
In this essay, he notes the foods preferred by ancient thinkers and recounts the banquets of kings and Greek philosophers. In one passage, he asks: “Could the ancients have succeeded in their meals and banquets without the potato?”, and then makes an exalted apology for the tuber. In the same way, he does not miss the opportunity to polemicize, and again attacks the clergy. He cannot conceive that while the masses suffer from hunger, the clergy live in opulence.

For Montalvo, this is one of the most remarkable permanent phenomena in the life of all peoples and in the long process of human history. In the description of feasts, he refers to the immoral customs of Greco-Latin antiquity, especially when he deals with the life of Alcibiades.

For Professor Antonio Sacoto, it is the least successful of the treatises both aesthetically and for its content, while noting that it looks like an attempt to analyze Plato's Dialogues.

=== El buscapié ===
Montalvo had been thinking of imitating Cervantes for some time, and consequently wrote his novel Capítulos que se le olvidaron a Cervantes. El buscapié, which later served as a prologue for the aforementioned novel, aims to explain that, by imitating Cervantes, he does not intend to equal or compete with him, but simply to offer him a tribute. Throughout this essay, one can see the inner battle that Montalvo carried, who, by all means, wants to present himself as humble and to apologize: he refers to his work as an “audacity” and also as “our little work”.

On the other hand, this treatise contains several critical comments. For example, it was one of the first writings to refer to Don Quixote as a work of art, and not of casual inspiration: “Don Quixote is not a work of simple inspiration, as an ode can be; it is a work of art, one of the greatest and most difficult that great geniuses have ever brought to the top”. He also notes that Don Quixote and Sancho are not only archetypes and antagonistic characters, but characters that complement and complete each other: “Neither Don Quixote is ridiculous, nor Sancho a knave, without the ridiculousness of the one and the beauty of the other resulting in some general benefit.”

== Transcendence ==
The Seven Treatises were Juan Montalvo's most successful work. For several weeks, between June and July 1883, during which he remained in Madrid, the press of the city dedicated praiseworthy comments to him and his work. In November of the same year, the government of Venezuela granted Montalvo the fifth class decoration of the Bust of the Liberator, for having highly distinguished himself in literature. Likewise, several literary societies of Latin America named him their Member of Honor. A Central American country (possibly El Salvador) even requested 400 copies to be distributed among all its libraries as a model of good reading. The transitory economic success moved the writer so much that he sent fabrics and clothes to his family, as well as a grand piano to Eloy Alfaro's sister.

However, in Ecuador, the Seven Treatises were condemned by the Archbishop of Quito, José Ignacio Ordóñez. In a pastoral letter, he described the work as a “brood of vipers in a basket of flowers”, with which its author “bends the knee before our adorable redeemer, but it is to give him sacrilegious slaps in his divine face.” Some thinkers did not agree with his opinion, as in the case of Francisco García Calderón, who wrote:

For three years now, only Sir Juan Montalvo has managed to completely excite me; and I see that my enthusiasm was well-founded, since his illustriousness of Quito has condemned the book, giving the world a sample of his very clear lights, of his pilgrim wit, of his sapiensa sum. Minister of the one who left in the world the sublime moral, to condemn the most moral book that the last twenty years have produced.

In any case, Montalvo quickly reacted and wrote his book Mercurial Eclesiástica, full of violent attacks against Ordóñez and the clergy.

== Bibliography ==
- Naranjo, Plutarco (1966). Los escritos de Montalvo [Montalvo's Writings] (in Spanish). Quito: Casa de la Cultura Ecuatoriana. ISBN 978-9978-62-327-5.
- Sacoto, Antonio (1973). Juan Montalvo: el Escritor y el Estilista [Juan Montalvo: the Writer and the Stylist] (in Spanish). Quito: Casa de la Cultura Ecuatoriana. ISBN 978-9978921364.
- Lara, Darío (1985). Juan Montalvo en París, Tomo II [Juan Montalvo in Paris, Volume II] (in Spanish). Quito: Subsecretaría de cultura I. Municipio de Ambato.
