= Segundo Luis Moreno =

Ecuadorian composer and musicologist (1882–1972)

Segundo Luis Moreno Andrade (August 3, 1882 – November 18, 1972) was an Ecuadorian composer and musicologist.

Born in Cotacachi, Moreno began his musical career in Quito, where he played the clarinet in a band. Studies at the National Conservatory in Quito followed; he then became a military bandmaster, serving in various locations throughout Ecuador. When the National Conservatory of Music in Cuenca was established in 1937, he took over its leadership; later he directed the conservatory in Guayaquil as well. Most of Moreno's music was composed for military band, and many of his works celebrate various important national occasions. He also wrote for orchestra as well. Active also as a musicologist, he published a number of treatises and papers on Ecuadorian ethnomusicology; his writings contain the only extant descriptions of numerous musical practices found in various parts of the country. Moreno died in Quito.
