= Jaime Zapata (painter) =

Ecuadorian painter (born 1957)

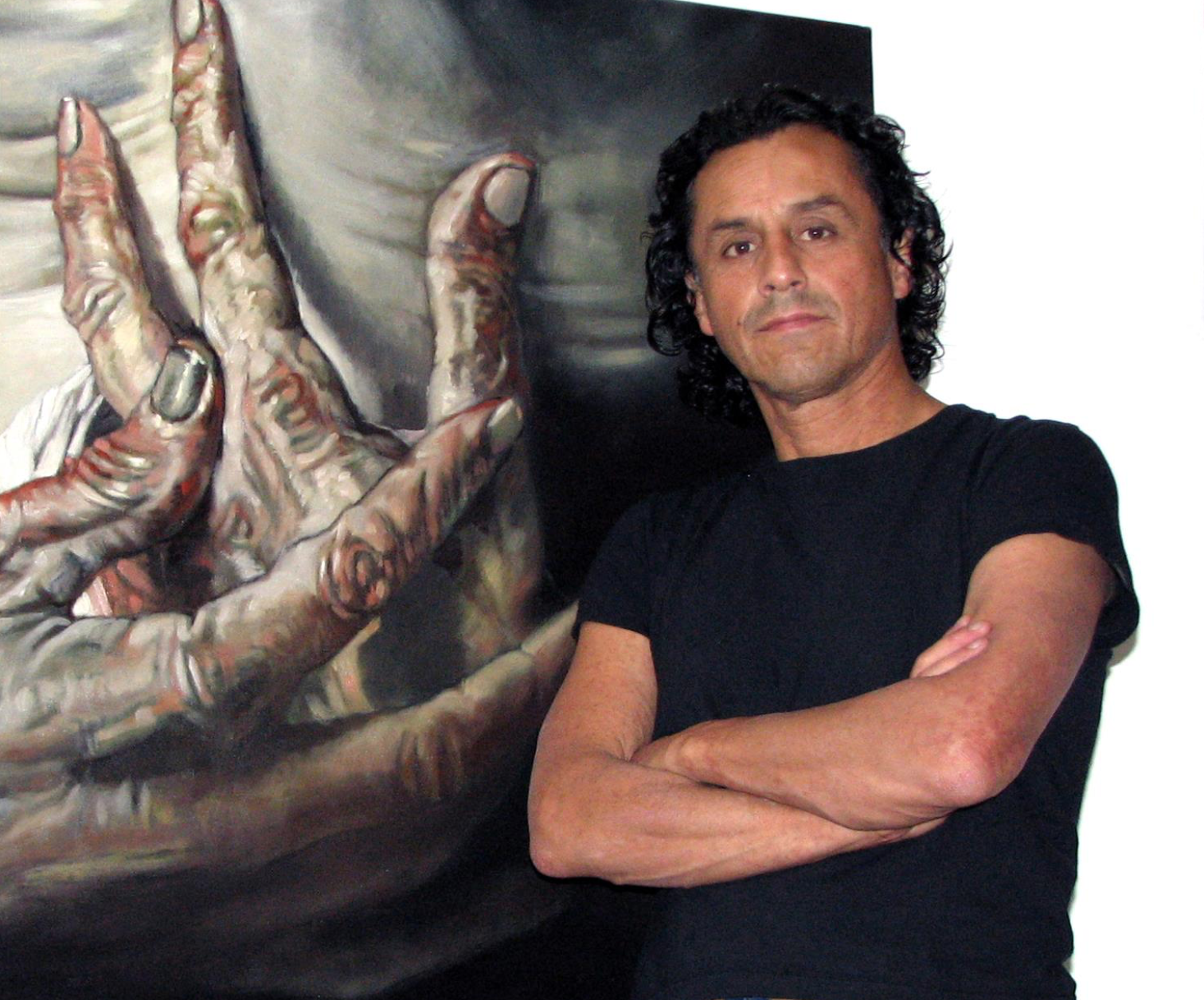
- Born: November 26, 1957; Quito, Ecuador
- Education: Universidad Central de Quito
- Known for: Painting

Jaime Zapata (26 November 1957) is an Ecuadorian painter. He graduated from the Art Faculty of the School of Plastic Arts at the Universidad Central de Quito in 1972.

Zapata is known for his artistic depictions of women. As of 2014 he lives and works in Paris, France.
