= Juan Montalvo =

Ecuadorian writer

Juan Montalvo y Fiallos
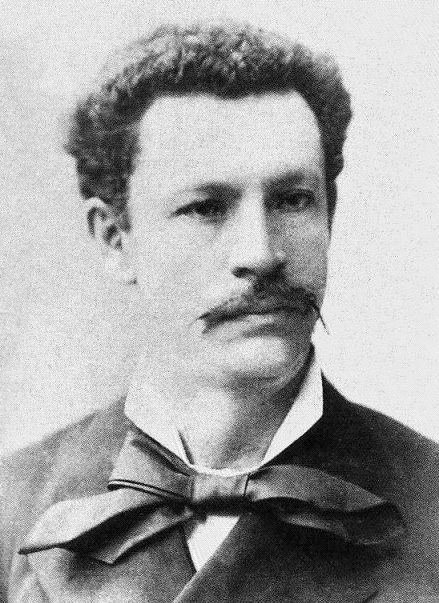
- Born: Juan María Montalvo y Fiallos; 13 April 1832; Ambato, Ecuador
- Died: 17 January 1889 (aged 56); Paris, France
- Occupation: Writer
- Writing career
- Notable works: Las catilinarias (1880), Capítulos que se le olvidaron a Cervantes (1868), Siete tratados (1882)
- Movement: Romanticism

Juan María Montalvo Fiallos (13 April 1832 - 17 January 1889) was an Ecuadorian essayist and novelist. His writing was strongly marked by anti-clericalism and opposition to presidents Gabriel García Moreno and Ignacio de Veintemilla. He was the publisher of the magazine El Cosmopolita. One of his best-known books is Las Catilinarias, published in 1880. His essays include Siete tratados (1882) and Geometría Moral (posthumous, 1902). He also wrote a sequel to Don Quixote de la Mancha, called Capítulos que se le olvidaron a Cervantes. He was admired by writers, essayists, intellectuals such as Jorge Luis Borges and Miguel de Unamuno. He died in Paris in 1889. His body was embalmed and is exhibited in a mausoleum in his hometown of Ambato.

== Biography ==
His grandfather, José Santos Montalvo, born in Andalucía, migrated to América and after some years working as a cinchona bark gatherer across Panamá, Venezuela and Colombia, he arrived at Ecuador where he worked as a seller of fabrics. In Guano, Ecuador, he met Jacinta Oviedo, whom he married and had many children, one of them was Marcos, father of Juan Montalvo, who worked also as a traveller fabrics seller.

In one of Marcos' business trips, he arrives at Quinchicoto, a small town near Ambato, where he meets María José Fiallos and with whom he marries in the church "La Matriz" in Ambato, January 1, 1811.

Born in Ambato to José Marcos Montalvo and Josefa Fiallos, he studied philosophy and law in Quito before returning to his hometown in 1854. He held diplomatic posts in Italy and France from 1857 to 1859. A political liberal, Montalvo's beliefs were marked by anti-clericalism and a keen hatred for the two caudillos that ruled Ecuador during his life: Gabriel García Moreno and Ignacio de Veintemilla. After an issue of El Cosmopolita viciously attacked Moreno, Montalvo was exiled to Colombia for seven years. Moreno's assassination was attributed to Montalvo's writings. He was a dedicated champion of democracy and an enemy of the writer Juan León Mera.

In the late seventies Juan Montalvo was twice exiled to France, remaining there from 1879, as punishment for Las catilinarias (1880), the work that made him famous throughout intellectual circles in the United States, Europe and the rest of Latin America. Alongside full-length books, Montalvo was an accomplished essayist, and his Siete Tratados (1882) and Geometría Moral (published in 1902, after his death) were popular in Ecuador and were banned by Veintemilla.

He also wrote a sequel to Miguel de Cervantes's Don Quixote, called Capítulos que se le Olvidaron a Cervantes ("Chapters Cervantes Forgot"), published posthumously in 1895. He died of tuberculosis in Paris. His mummified body now rests in a mausoleum in his birthplace of Ambato.

== Family ==
Juan Montalvo's father was Marco Montalvo Oviedo of Guano, and his mother was María Josefa Fiallos y Villacreces of Ambato. Montalvo was the youngest of 7 siblings: Francisco, Francisco Javier, Mariano, Alegría, Rosa, Juana and Isabel. Montalvo married María Guzmán Suárez in Ambato on 17 October 1868 and had two children with her. In 1882 he met Augustine Contoux with whom he had one child.

== Legacy ==
Montalvo's likeness appears on the Ecuadorian five-centavo coin.

== Works ==
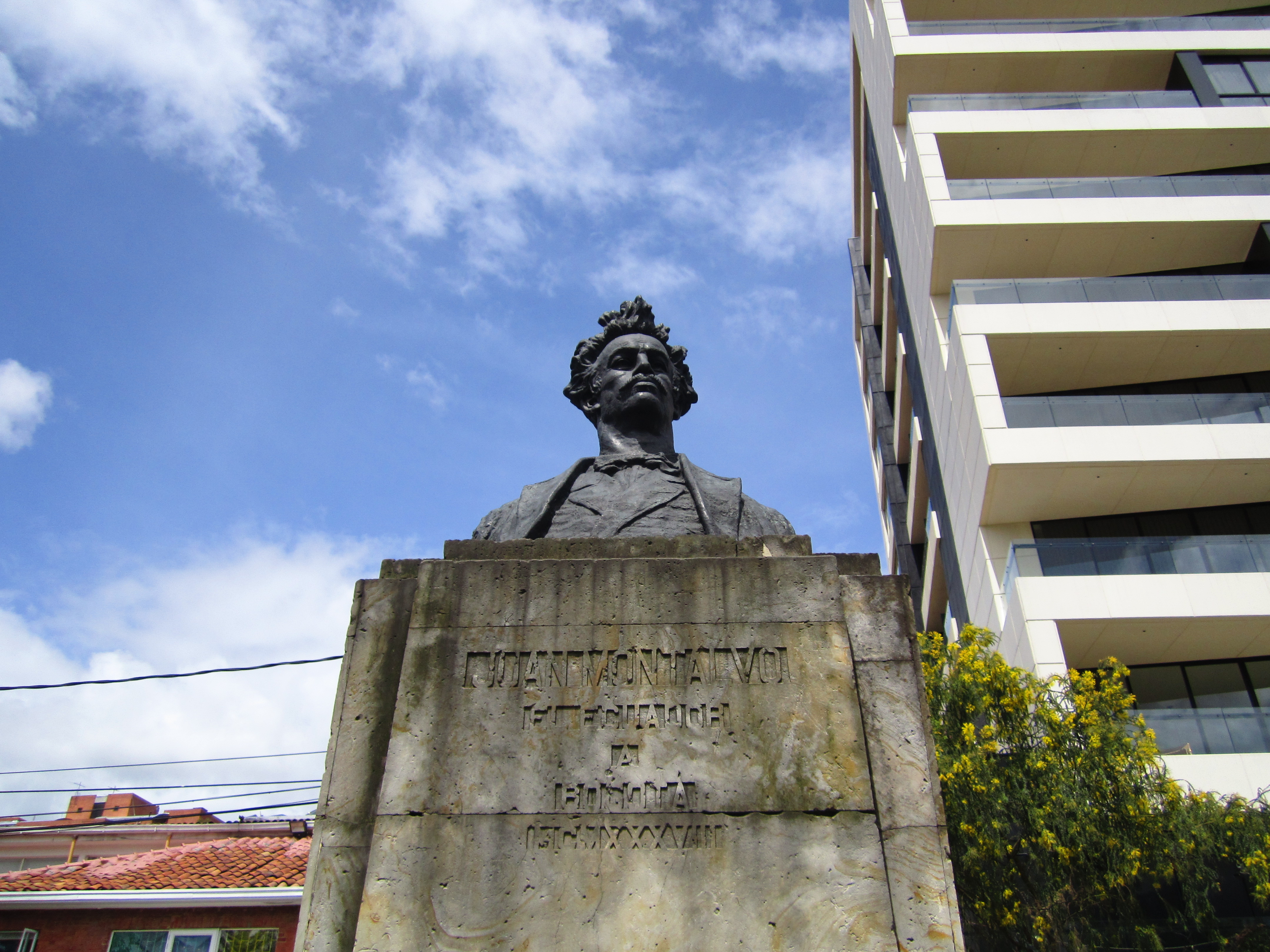
Bust of Juan Montalvo in Bogotá

- Las catilinarias (1880)
- Capítulos que se le olvidaron a Cervantes (1868) - Montalvo's only novel
- Libro de las pasiones (published posthumously in 1935) contains the dramas La Leprosa, Jara, Granja, El Descomulgado and El Dictador
- Siete Tratados (1882)
- Geometría Moral (published posthumously in 1902)
- Judas (1872)

=== Literary and political magazines founded by Montalvo ===
- La Razón (1848)
- El Veterano (1849)
- La Moral evangélica (1854)
- El Espectador (1855)
- El Cosmopolita (1865)
- El Regenerador (1872)
