= Universidad del Pacífico (Ecuador) =

Private university in Ecuador

- Universidad Del Pacífico – Escuela de Negocios
- Type: Private, non-profit
- Established: December 18, 1997; 28 years ago
- Accreditation: CACES
- Chancellor: Sonia Roca
- Rector: Stalin Muñoz Vaca
- Location: Guayaquil (seat) and Quito, Ecuador
- Website: upacifico.edu.ec

The Universidad del Pacífico (UPACIFICO; legal name Universidad Del Pacífico – Escuela de Negocios) is a private, non-profit university in Ecuador with campuses in Guayaquil and Quito. It began as a business school run by a Guayaquil foundation and became a university by act of the National Congress in December 1997. After a poor showing in the national evaluation of 2009 it climbed to category C in 2013 and has held full accreditation from the state quality agency CACES since 2020.

== History ==
Before it was a university, UPACIFICO was the Escuela de Negocios del Pacífico, a business school run by the Fundación para el Desarrollo de la Cultura Empresarial, a Guayaquil foundation headed by the lawyer Sonia Roca. Law No. 43, passed by the National Congress and published in the Registro Oficial on 18 December 1997, turned the school into a university with legal personality of its own. The statute names the foundation and its life directors as founders; Roca is listed as founder and the chemist and businessman Kurt Freund Ruf as co-founder. Álvaro Pérez Intriago, the legislator who sponsored the bill, was given an honorary doctorate by the university ten years later.

A first statute followed in 1998. When the higher-education council CONESUP approved a revised statute in July 2001 it also authorised a teaching unit in Cuenca. The CES, its successor body, confirmed the Cuenca unit in 2012, and the statute of 2016 still describes three campuses, in Quito, Guayaquil and Cuenca, with Guayaquil as the legal seat. Only Quito and Guayaquil appear in the university's current listings.

=== Evaluation and accreditation ===
In 2009 the evaluation council CONEA, acting under Constituent Mandate 14, reviewed every university in the country and put the Universidad del Pacífico in the bottom group, category E. Its successor CEAACES went back over the category E institutions in April 2012 and closed fourteen of them. The Universidad del Pacífico was one of eight judged to be in "partial compliance": it stayed open but could not enrol students in distance-learning programmes. In November 2013 CEAACES placed it in category C, which came with a five-year accreditation, and it stayed in category C when the categories were revised in 2016. After the external evaluation of 2019, CACES accredited the university by resolution 159-SE-33-CACES-2020.

== Organisation ==
A Consejo Rector, or rector's council, governs the university. The statute also provides for a chancellor, for the Consejo de Regentes that Ecuadorian law requires of self-financed private universities, and for a business advisory board. Sonia Roca holds the chancellorship. Freund was rector from about 2018 to 2021; Stalin Muñoz Vaca succeeded him.

There are four faculties: business and economics; sea and environment; law and educational sciences; and engineering, innovation and technology. Most undergraduate degrees are in business subjects such as accounting, marketing, finance and international business, but the maritime faculty teaches maritime engineering and transport management and there are degrees in law, tourism and computing. At master's level the university offers an MBA and programmes in port management, international maritime law, tourism management and occupational health and safety. It has signed the United Nations Principles for Responsible Management Education and takes part in the United Nations Global Compact.

== Research and publications ==
The university has published an annual journal, Carácter (ISSN 2602-8476), since 2012. It is peer-reviewed, open access and listed in the Latindex catalogue. In the Times Higher Education Impact Rankings for 2025 the university sat in the 1501+ band overall; its best result was the 201–300 band for the sustainable development goal on life below water.

== Honorary degrees ==
Honorary doctorates have gone to the Japanese management consultant Masaaki Imai (2002), the Quito mayor Paco Moncayo (2004), the Nobel Peace laureate Muhammad Yunus (2007), the Olympic race walker Jefferson Pérez (2008), the Pichincha vice-prefect Marcela Costales (2008) and the Cuenca mayor Paúl Granda (2011), as well as to several of the university's own officers and professors.
