= Costales =

Costales is a Spanish surname. Notable people with the surname include:

- Eugene N. Costales (1894–1984), American stamp dealer and auctioneer
- Luella Costales, American politician
- Luis Alberto Costales (1926–2006), Ecuadorian poet
- Luis de Pablo Costales (1930–2021), Spanish composer
- Marcela Costales (1951–2020), Ecuadorian historian and politician
