= Jenny Estrada =

Ecuadorian writer and journalist (1940–2024)

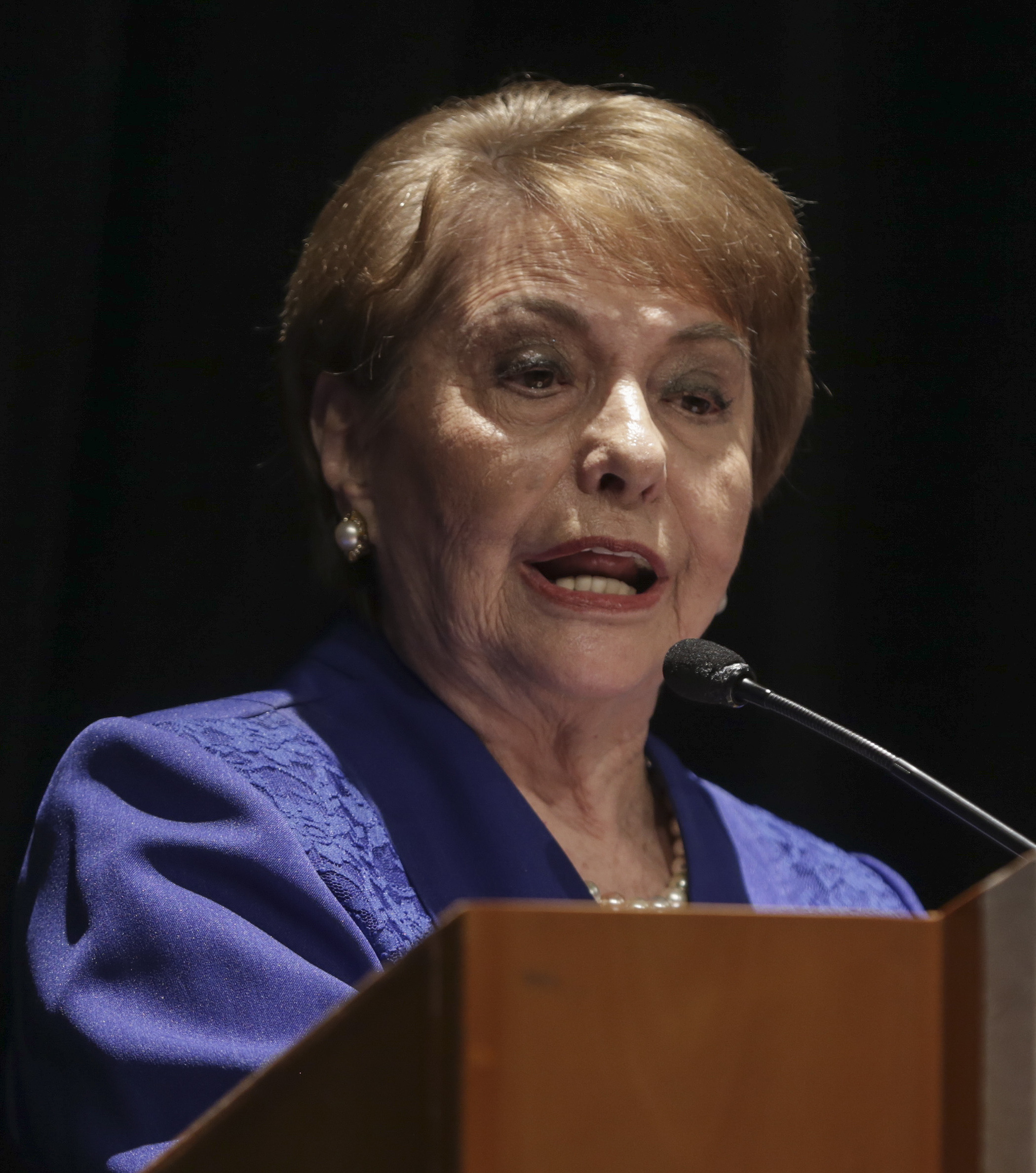
Estrada in 2018

Jenny María Estrada Ruiz (21 June 1940 – 9 February 2024) was an Ecuadorian writer and journalist. She was the first woman to write an opinion piece for El Universo and she created the Julio Jaramillo Municipal Museum of Popular Music.

== Life and career ==
Estrada Her parents were Olga Ruiz Robles who was an opera singer and Miguel Estrada Valle who was a doctor of Jurisprudence. She completed her high school studies at the "La Inmaculada" school in Guayaquil. She worked for the publication "El Universo". In 1968 creating a column of "Feminine Opinion" using the nom de plume of María Ignacia. She was the first woman to write a column of opinion for the paper. She made interviews and wrote articles for the paper and in addition she wrote ten books. In 1994 she researched and wrote a book about the customs and traditions of her home city titled Del Tiempo de la Yapa. Two years later she wrote El Montubio - un forjador de identidad about the cowboys who lived on the coast.

Estrada was known for her interest in the history of Guayaquil. She inspired the creation of the Julio Jaramillo Municipal Museum of Popular Music and its foundation. She was the foundation's director until 2019.

In 2018 she was awarded the Matilde Hidalgo Prize for cultural merit. The award was made by the economist Elizabeth Cabezas Guerrero who was the, President of Ecuador's National Assembly. The presentation was on 9 October which was the 198th anniversary of the independence of the city of Santiago de Guayaquil.

She died at the age of 83 on 9 February 2024.

== Works ==
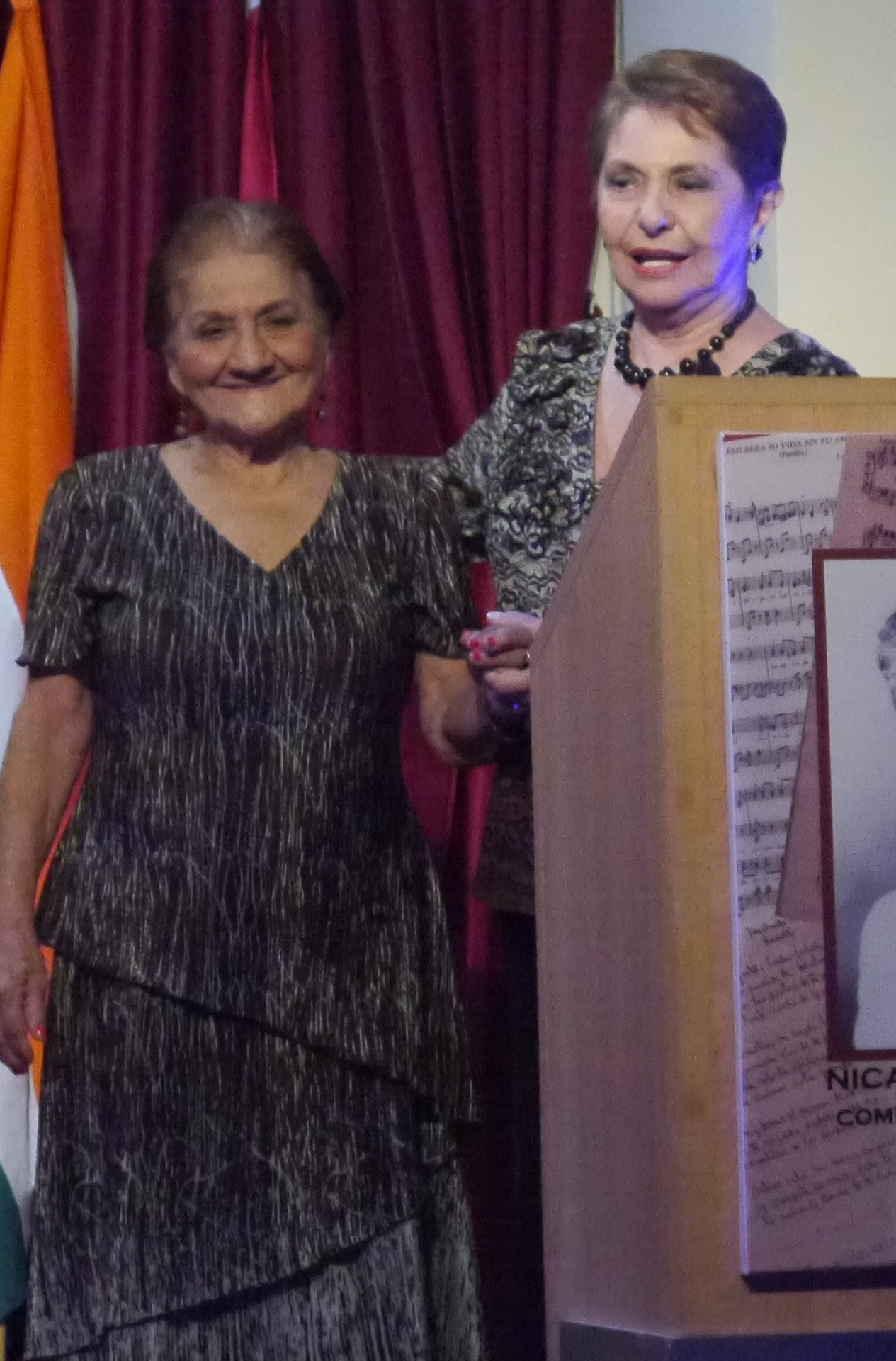
Jenny Estrada with the singer Fresia Saavedra

- Las mujeres de Guayaquil, siglo XVI al XX, 1972
- Personajes y circunstancias
- Matilde Hidalgo de Prócel, una mujer total, 1981
- Mujeres de Guayaquil, 1984
- La epopeya del Aviso Atahualpa (1990)
- Ancón en la historia petrolera ecuatoriana: 1911 - 1976
- El Montubio - un forjador de identidad, 1996
- Los italianos de Guayaquil
