= Las Tres Marias =

(Las) Tres Marias ("The Three Marys") may refer to:

- Três Marias, a municipality in Minas Gerais, Brazil
- Las Tres Marías (group), an Afro-Ecuadorian musical trio
- Islas Marías, Mexico
- Orion's Belt, in the Orion constellation
- Three 1990s telenovelas starring Thalía: Maria Mercedes, Marimar, and María la del Barrio
