= Cámara de Industriales de Pichincha =

Ecuadorian industrial trade association founded in 1936

Cámara de Industrias y Producción
- Abbreviation: CIP
- Formation: September 5, 1936; 90 years ago
- Type: Trade association
- Headquarters: Edificio Las Cámaras, Avenida Amazonas y República, Quito
- Region served: Ecuador
- President of the board: José María Ponce (2026–2027)
- Executive president: María Paz Jervis (since 2022)
- Website: cip.org.ec
- Formerly called: Cámara de Industriales de Pichincha (1936–2009)

The Cámara de Industrias y Producción (CIP), known until 2009 as the Cámara de Industriales de Pichincha, is an Ecuadorian trade association of manufacturing and other productive companies, based in Quito. Founded on 5 September 1936 by seventeen industrialists of Pichincha Province, it represented the industry of the Ecuadorian highlands for seven decades and is now, with the Cámara de Industrias de Guayaquil, one of the country's principal industrial chambers. Its member firms account for about 30 per cent of Ecuador's non-oil GDP and more than 150,000 direct jobs, according to the chamber.

== History ==
=== Foundation ===
The chamber was created in the aftermath of the collapse of Ecuador's cocoa economy and the Four Days' War of 1932, when a 1936 decree of the government of Federico Páez called on producers to organise themselves into chambers. Seventeen industrialists from the textile, flour-milling, leather, tobacco, brewing, pasta, timber and mining sectors, most of them already members of the Quito chamber of commerce, founded the Cámara de Industriales de la Provincia de Pichincha on 5 September 1936. Its first president was the industrialist Ramón González Artigas, who served again in 1955–56. In its early decades the chamber pressed for tariff protection and industrial promotion laws, and from 1945 it published a bulletin. It created the decoration "Al Mérito Industrial" for member companies in the late 1950s.

=== National voice of industry ===
During the oil boom of the 1970s and the return to democracy after 1979 the chamber's presidents were regular participants in national economic debate. Pedro Kohn, president in 1984–86 and again in 1988–89, was a prominent critic of the economic policy of the governments of León Febres Cordero and Rodrigo Borja, and in the 1990s the chamber took positions on state modernisation and privatisation under presidents Roberto Peña Durini and Kurt Freund Ruf. The chamber is a founding member of the Federación Nacional de Cámaras de Industrias del Ecuador, created in 1972 to group the provincial industrial chambers.

=== Cámara de Industrias y Producción ===
In 2009 the chamber reformed its statutes, dropped the provincial limitation on membership and adopted its present name, Cámara de Industrias y Producción. It then created the post of executive president, held in succession by Pablo Dávila, Richard Martínez (from June 2014), Pablo Zambrano Albuja (from July 2018) and, since October 2022, María Paz Jervis, the first woman to hold it. The chamber marked its 80th anniversary in November 2016 with a ceremony at which portraits of its 34 past board presidents were displayed. Its offices are in the Edificio Las Cámaras on Avenida Amazonas in Quito, shared with other business associations.

== Presidents ==
The chamber is governed by a Junta Directiva whose president is elected by the members, usually for a one- or two-year term; since 2009 a salaried executive president runs the institution day to day. The following presidents of the board are attested in published sources; the list is not complete.

Years	President	Source
1936–1938	Ramón González Artigas	
1951	Manuel E. Cadena Arteaga	
1955–1956	Ramón González Artigas	
1964–1965	Eduardo Sosa Salazar	
c. 1971	Gonzalo Chiriboga Cordovez	
1972–1973	Ernesto Rivadeneira	
c. 1973	Eugenio Hieremans	
1975	Jaime Robalino Vásconez	
c. 1976–1981	Pablo Ruiz Pérez	
c. 1981–1982	Eduardo Villaquirán	
c. 1983	Jacinto Vélez	
1984–1986	Pedro Kohn	
c. 1986	Gustavo Pinto Albornoz	
1988–1989	Pedro Kohn	
c. 1991	Roberto Peña Durini	
1992–1994	Kurt Freund Ruf	
c. 1998–2003	Gustavo Pinto Albornoz	
c. 2005	Carlos Ponce Martínez	
2010	Diego Fernández-Salvador	
2014	José Vicente Maldonado	
2015–2016	Ignacio Bustamante	
2016	Bernardo Gómez	
2018–2019	José Vicente Maldonado	
2019–2021	Ignacio Bustamante	
2023	Sebastián Borja	
2024–2026	Ignacio Bustamante	
2026–2027	José María Ponce	
