= Kurt Freund Ruf =

Ecuadorian chemist and businessman (born 1948)

- Born: Kurt Alfredo Freund Ruf; 1948 (age 77–78)
- Education: University of the Pacific (MS, 1969); Imperial College London (PhD, 1973)
- Occupations: Chemist, businessman, university administrator, columnist
- Title: Rector of the Universidad del Pacífico (c. 2018–2021); President of the Ecuadorian–Israeli Chamber of Innovation and Commerce (2021–present)

Kurt Alfredo Freund Ruf (born 1948) is an Ecuadorian chemist and businessman. He trained as an organic chemist under Derek Barton at Imperial College London and was one of the authors of the first total synthesis of bikaverin (1975–76). In Ecuador he ran the family paint company Pinturas Wesco and held a series of business and public posts, among them president of the Cámara de Industriales de Pichincha (1993) and chairman of the state telephone company EMETEL (1995–96). He was rector of the Universidad del Pacífico from about 2018 to 2021, has led the Ecuadorian–Israeli Chamber of Innovation and Commerce since 2021, and writes a column for El Comercio.

== Early life and education ==
Freund was born in 1948. His family owned Pinturas Wesco, a paint manufacturer in Quito, until the brand was sold to Pintulac.

He took a master's degree in chemistry at the University of the Pacific in Stockton, California, in 1969. His thesis, supervised by Herschel Frye, dealt with palladium complexes of imino acids and was published in Inorganic and Nuclear Chemistry Letters in 1971. He then went to Imperial College London for a doctorate in Barton's laboratory. His thesis, The synthesis of linear aromatic systems, was accepted by the University of London in 1973. Out of this work came the synthesis of bikaverin, a fungal pigment, which Barton's group announced in Chemical Communications in 1975 and described in full in Perkin Transactions 1 the following year. Freund was one of the six authors, with Barton, Louis Cottier, Fulvio Luini, Philip Magnus and Ignacio Salazar.

== Business career ==
Freund joined Pinturas Wesco in 1971 and later ran the company. From 1980 he was also executive president of the chemical firm Interquim and a director of Banco Amazonas, a bank whose board he later chaired.

In 1993 he was president of the Cámara de Industriales de Pichincha, the industrialists' chamber of Pichincha Province, and spoke for it in the debate over the privatisation programme of President Sixto Durán Ballén. A 2021 profile in Revista Líderes also lists him as a former president of the Federación Nacional de Industriales and a former director of the Comisión Ecuatoriana de Energía Atómica, the Federación Ecuatoriana de Exportadores and the Cámara de la Industria Automotriz Ecuatoriana.

In 1995 and 1996 he chaired the board of EMETEL, the state telephone company, while the government was trying to sell a stake in it.

His later business has been in energy. He chairs the board of HJ Becdach, the Quito firm behind the Expo Oil & Power trade fair, and in June 2022 he was elected to the board of the newly formed Cámara de Energía del Ecuador. In November 2023 he was chairman of the board of the Empresa Eléctrica Quito, the city's electricity utility.

== Universidad del Pacífico ==
Freund was the founder and eventually rector of the Universidad del Pacífico, a private university in Quito and Guayaquil, from about 2018 until 2021. While there he co-wrote a 2019 article on green chemistry and the circular economy for the university's journal Carácter.

He used the post to argue publicly about energy policy. In 2020 he called for biomass and geothermal energy to be added to Ecuador's electricity master plan, and in 2021 he made the case for green hydrogen as a future export.

== Ecuadorian–Israeli Chamber of Innovation and Commerce ==
Freund is president of the Cámara de Innovación y Comercio Ecuatoriano-Israelí (CICEI), launched in Quito on 29 November 2021 to encourage trade and investment between Ecuador and Israel. At the launch he pointed out that Ecuador exported far less to Israel than its neighbours did and said the chamber's main job would be to bring Israeli technology into the country. He and a CICEI delegation travelled with President Guillermo Lasso on his visit to Israel in May 2022.

== Writing ==
Freund has written a weekly column for El Comercio since at least December 1980, mostly on energy, technology and the economy.

=== Books ===
- Humanismo, ciencia y tecnología. Quito: Graficart, 1986.
- Mitos, falacias y nuevos paradigmas: apuntes sobre la modernidad (with Fabián Corral and Pablo Lucio Paredes). Quito: Cedigraf, 1992.
- Modernizar la mente: enfoque frente a la globalización y el siglo XXI. Quito: FUNDACYT, 1997.
- "La gestión educativa", in Visión a futuro de la educación. Quito: Ministerio de Educación y Cultura, 1999.
- El mundo en que vivirán nuestros hijos. 2021. ISBN 978-9942-86-335-5.
- Ensayos sobre la libertad (compiled with Ramiro Rivera; includes his chapter "¿Qué es la libertad?"). Samborondón: Universidad Espíritu Santo, 2025. ISBN 978-9978-25-275-8.

=== Scientific papers ===
- Freund, K.; Frye, H. (1971). "Palladium(II) complexes of cyclic imino acids". Inorganic and Nuclear Chemistry Letters. 7 (1): 107–109.
- Barton, D. H. R.; Cottier, L.; Freund, K.; Luini, F.; Magnus, P. D.; Salazar, I. (1975). "Synthesis of bikaverin". Journal of the Chemical Society, Chemical Communications (15): 646.
- Barton, D. H. R.; Cottier, L.; Freund, K.; Luini, F.; Magnus, P. D.; Salazar, I. (1976). "Total synthesis of bikaverin". Journal of the Chemical Society, Perkin Transactions 1 (5): 499–503.
