= Matilde Hidalgo Prize =

Prize for Women in Ecuador

Matilde Hidalgo Award
- Awarded for: Recognition to people or institutions that have contributed to Science, Innovation and Technology, in Ecuador
- Country: Ecuador
- Presented by: Legislative Branch of Ecuador; Secretariat of Higher Education, Science, Technology and Innovation (SENESCYT); Casa de la Cultura Benjamin Carrión
- Rewards: A medal, and a diploma

Dra. Matilde Hidalgo de Procel Medal
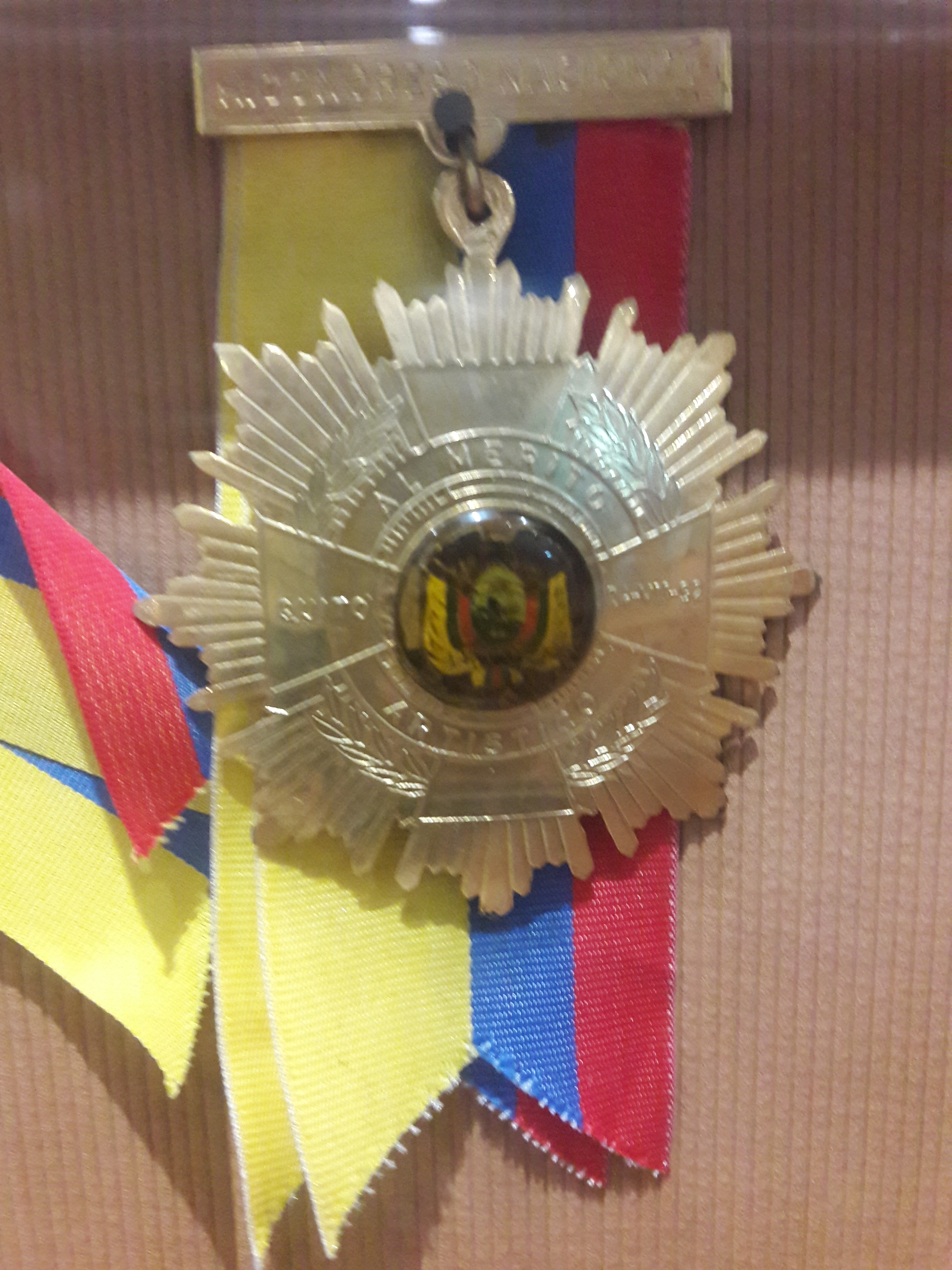
- Awarded for: Awarded to women who have excelled in political, cultural, educational, business, economic, scientific, labor, social or sports activities.
- Presented by: Legislative Branch of Ecuador

The Matilde Hidaldo de Prócel Medal is one of the highest distinctions awarded by the Ecuadorian legislative branch. Originally by the Ecuadorian National Congress now the National Assembly; it is awarded to outstanding women that have distinguished themselves in political, cultural, educational, business, economic, scientific research, social and sports activities.

== Matilde Hidalgo Award - Legislative Branch of Ecuador ==
=== Award recipients ===
National Congress
Year	Matilde Hidalgo de Prócel Medal	Genre
2002	Aminta Buenaño	Literary Merit
2005	Sor Luisa Muñoz Sánchez	Social Merit
2007	Sonia Roca	Educational Merit

National Assembly
Year	Matilde Hidalgo de Prócel Medal	Genre
2012	Isabel Noboa	Business Merit
2013	Paulina Aulestia	Climbing Everest
2017	Irina Bokova	Social Merit
2017	Beatriz Parra	Music
2017	Las Tres Marías	Music
2017	Lidia Noboa	Music
2017	Jannet Alvarado	Music
2017	Rosy Revelo	Visual Arts
2017	Gina María Villacís	Visual Arts
2017	Eugenia Viteri	Literature
2017	Sara Vanegas Coveña	Literature
2017	Leonor Bravo Velásquez	Literature
2017	María Fernanda Restrepo	Cinema
2017	Mónica Vázquez	Cinema
2017	Karla Gachet	Photography
2018	Laura Pausini	Music
2018	Mirella Cesa	Music
2018	Ada Yonath	Science
2019	Mónica Amboya	Sports
2019	Diana Aguavil	Social Merit
2020	Jacqueline Costales	Literature

== Matilde Hidalgo Award - Secretariat of Higher Education, Science, Technology and Innovation (SENESCYT) ==
The Matilde Hidalgo award is given to people or institutions that contribute to the development of higher education, science, technology and innovation in Ecuador.

This award is given annually since 2016 by the Secretariat of Higher Education, Science, Technology and Innovation.

The award is given in two categories: institutional and trajectory. There are 14 subcategories amongst which can be found: academic excellence, community outreach, scientific production and scientific disclosure for Latin America and the world, researcher of the year, amongst others.

Winners are considered by an external selection committee conformed by authorities of SENESCYT, the Council for Higher Education (CES) and the Council for Evaluation, Accreditation, and Quality Control for Higher Education (CEAACES).

== Matilde Hidalgo de Procel Award - Municipality of Machala ==
Since the Municipality of Machala grants the Matilde Hidalgo de Procel award in homage to International Women's Day. It is awarded to those that have promoted development in favor of women from different roles, whether these be solcial reintegration, economics, migration, or discrimination. The municipality makes a call in which citizens may make applications and the winners are chosen by the Gender Equality Commission of the Municipality of Machala.

== Matilde Hidalgo de Procel Award - Municipality of the Casa de la Cultura Ecuatoriana (CCE Loja) ==
The Casa de la Cultura Benjamin Carrión Loja nucleus grants the Matilde Hidalgo de Procel award, it is the highest recognition that the Provincial Nucleus gives to woman from Loja who develop a significant cultural task in Loja and the country
