= Paulina Aulestia =

Ecuadorian mountaineer

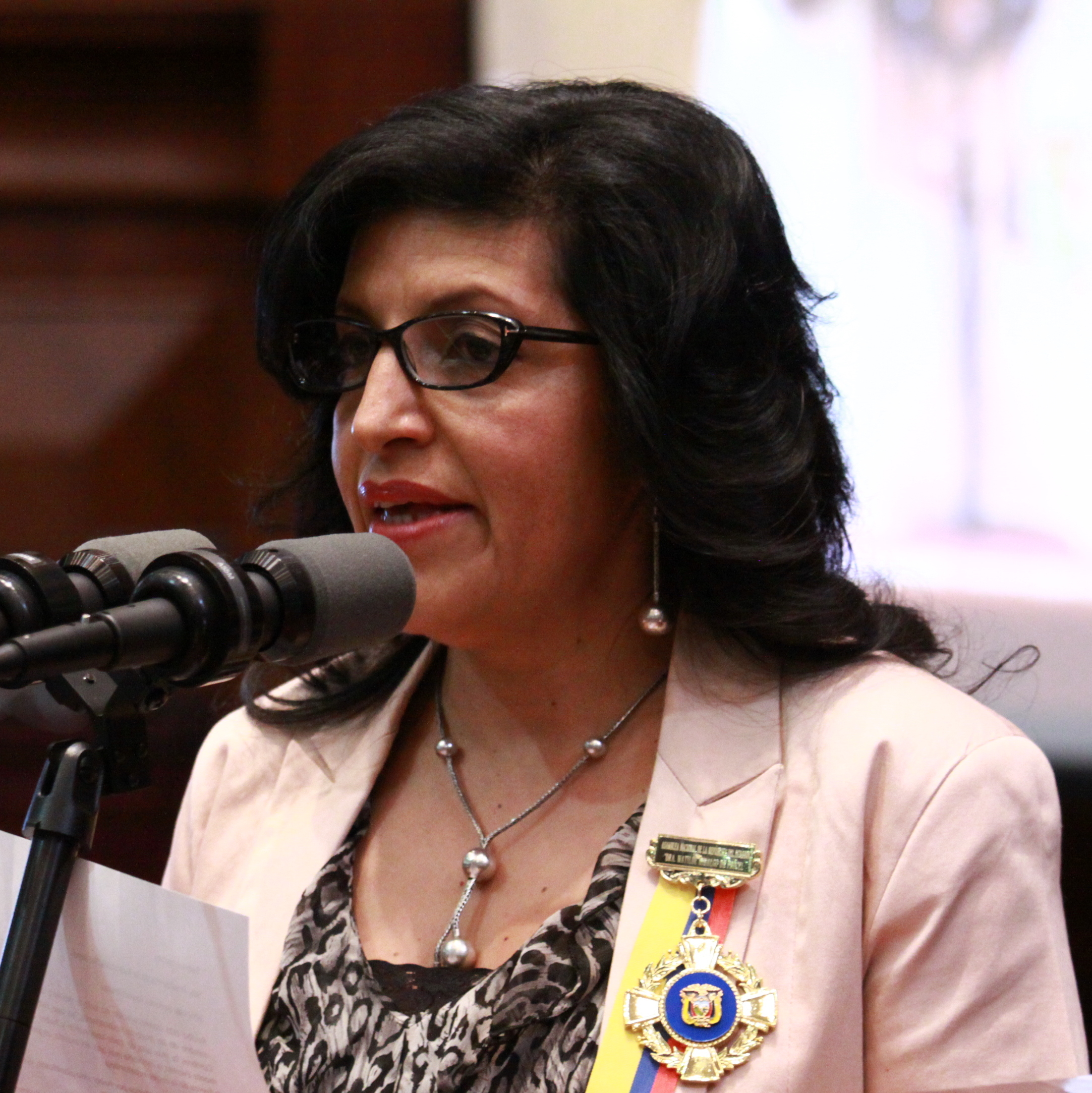
- A medal from the National Assembly
- Born: Jenny Paulina Aulestia Enríquez; 2 December 1967; Quito, Ecuador
- Education: Latin American Faculty of Social Sciences
- Occupation: lawyer
- Known for: summiting Everest
- Children: a daughter
- Website: Press clippings

Paulina Aulestia (born 2 December 1967) is an Ecuadorian mountaineer. She has completed the Seven Summits and was the first woman from Ecuador to climb Mount Everest.

== Life ==
Aulestia was born in Quito in 1967.

Aulestia belonged to the mountaineering group at the Central University of Ecuador where she graduated with a law degree in 1997. She had her specialization in Procedural Law which allowed her to be appointed Commissioner for Women and the Family in Quito from 2002 to 2004. She works as a lawyer, and in 2006 she first took part in the Everest expedition. She also graduated as a mountain tutor, working as a high mountain instructor.

She received training and support from Rafael Martínez, for her subsequent ascent to Everest. Martinez was also born in Quito. She continued her studies and completed a specialization in Gender and Development at FLACSO Ecuador headquarters in 2010. Her masters thesis was titled "Domestic violence: a legal and cultural analysis of cases processed at the First National Police Station for Women and Family of Quito Canton (period 2002 - 2004)."

== First Ecuadorian woman to climb Mount Everest ==
She was part of the first Ecuadorian expedition to Everest in 2006, where she was proclaimed the first woman to climb this mountain, although she had to turn back at 8,000 metres. Three years later she went higher to 8,600 metres. She received about $60,000 to fund another attempt by the Ministry of Sport. She managed to crown Everest, at 05:45 in Nepal on May 21, 2013, thus reaching the highest summit in the world at her third attempt. This was a peak of her career and her "Seven Summits" Project

In February 2006 she crowned Aconcagua, in July 2007 Elbrus, in July 2007 Kilimanjaro, in August 2007 Kosciusko, in May 2008 Denali. She completed the seven peaks challenge and she obtained the women's record for climbing the Cotopaxi volcano in 3 hours and 30 minutes. Her success was recognised by the Minister of Sport Catalina Ontaneda in a ceremony where Aulestia thanked her for her support.

She was awarded the Matilde Hidalgo Prize by the National Assembly's President Gabriela Rivadeneira in July 2013.
