= Pinturas Wesco =

Ecuadorian paint manufacturer founded in 1942

Pinturas Wesco S.A.
- Trade name: Wesco
- Type: Sociedad anónima
- Industry: Paints and coatings
- Founded: 1942; 84 years ago in Quito, Ecuador
- Founders: Roberto Ruf and Elvira Kywi de Ruf
- Headquarters: Quito, Ecuador
- Products: Architectural, automotive and industrial paints; powder coatings
- Revenue: US$28.8 million (2025)
- Number of employees: 115 (2026)
- Parent: Grupo Krear
- Website: pinturaswesco.com

Pinturas Wesco is an Ecuadorian paint manufacturer based in Quito. It was founded in 1942 as Pinturas Roberto Ruf and took the Wesco name in 1952. For most of its history the company belonged to the Ruf and Freund families; since 2013 it has been part of Grupo Krear, the group that also owns the paint retailer Pintulac. In 2026 it opened a new plant north of Quito and ranked third in the Ecuadorian paint market by sales.

== History ==
=== Ruf and Freund families, 1942–2013 ===
Roberto Ruf and his wife Elvira Kywi de Ruf founded the paint factory Pinturas Roberto Ruf Cía. Ltda. in Quito in 1942. It became the core of a family group, later known as Grupo Industrial Wesco, that also included Wesco S.A., P.K.M., Sintesa, Poliacrilart and Tecniquímica. Kalsomine sold under the Wesco brand was being advertised in Quito by 1951, and in 1952 the company was renamed Pinturas Wesco S.A. According to the company, it was the first manufacturer of water-based paints in Ecuador. The present legal entity was incorporated in March 1962.

In the 1970s the factory stood on Avenida 10 de Agosto in Quito; by 1984 it had moved to the Panamericana Norte, where it remained into the 2000s. The company says it painted the Andino, the first car assembled in Ecuador by Aymesa, in 1972, and that it introduced two-coat automotive finishes with BASF Glasurit in the mid-1980s. By the 1980s the business was run by the Freund family, descendants of the founders: Mario Freund was manager in 1984, and the chemist and businessman Kurt Freund Ruf, who joined the firm in 1971, was its listed representative in trade directories of the 1990s. In 1999 it began making electrostatic powder paint under the Duraplast brand, which it describes as the first in the country.

=== Grupo Krear, 2013–present ===
In 2013 the Freund family sold the company to the group built by Walter Betancourt around Pintulac, a paint retailer founded in Quito in 1984 and now called Grupo Krear. (Note: A 2024 report in Primicias placed the sale "two decades" earlier, around 2004. The company's own timeline and a 2026 interview with its operations director give 2013, which also matches the thirteen years the company then spent at its Carcelén plant.) Production moved to rented premises in the Carcelén industrial zone of northern Quito. Under the new owners the brand began exporting to Costa Rica, El Salvador and Guatemala in 2019, and powder paint to the United States and Peru from December 2023.

Between October 2023 and February 2026 the group built a new plant at Caspigasi, on the road to Calacalí north-west of Quito, at a cost of about US$15 million. It was inaugurated on 26 February 2026 and began production in March. The plant tripled capacity to roughly 30 million litres a year, has about 98 per cent of its processes automated, runs on some 800 solar panels and was the first paint factory in the region to receive EDGE Zero Carbon certification. The workforce grew from 60 to 115 between 2024 and 2026. Sales were US$28.8 million in 2025, a rise of 26 per cent on the previous year, of which exports were about one to two per cent.

== Products ==
Wesco makes architectural paints, automotive refinish and industrial coatings, and electrostatic powder coatings, the last of which make up most of its exports. In the 2010s it added satin, waterproofing, elastomeric and eggshell finishes, and in 2020 a line of disinfectants. The company sponsored the Quito football club LDU Quito from 1995.
