= Sonia Roca =

Sonia Adelina Roca De Castro
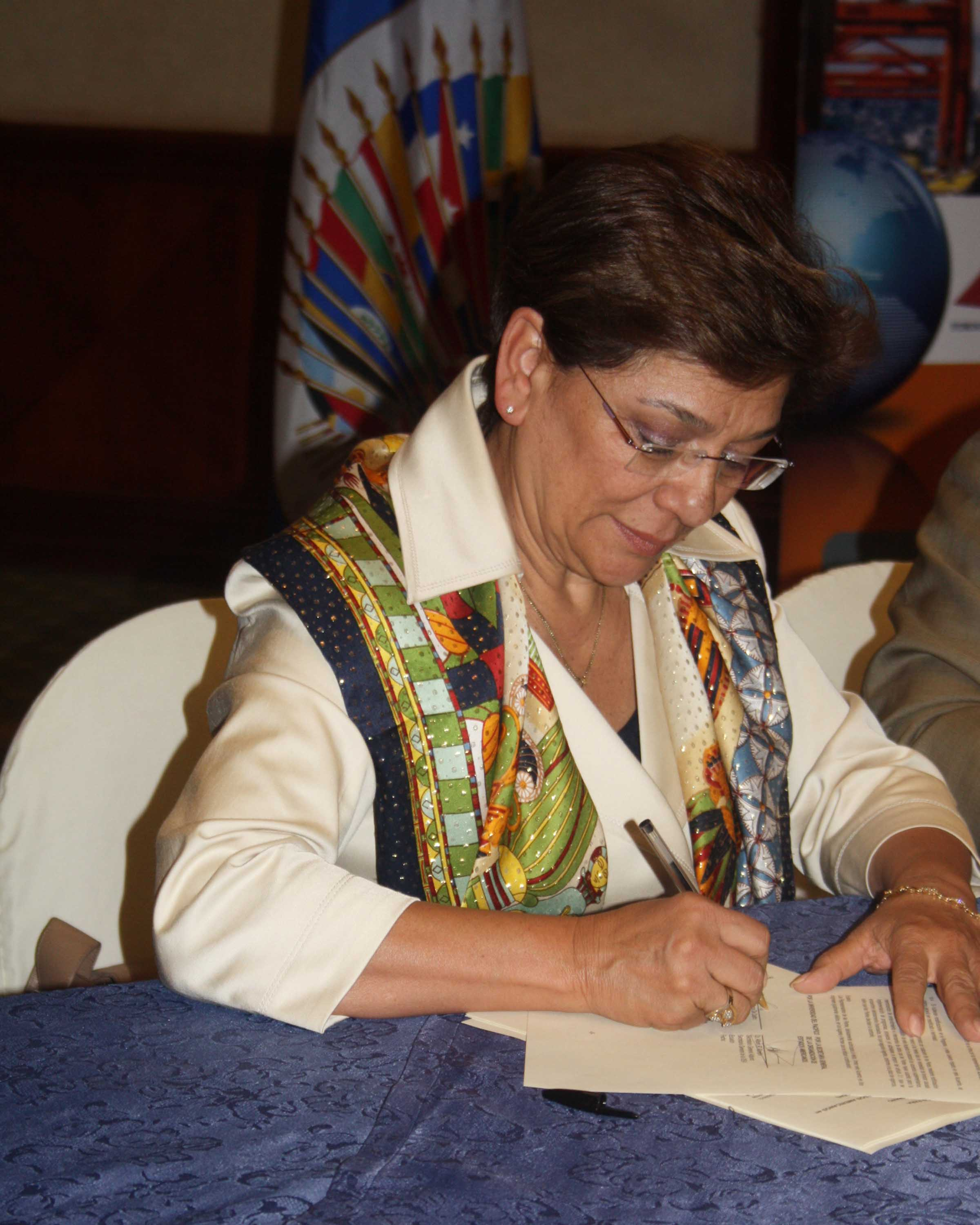

Chancellor of Universidad Del Pacífico - Escuela de Negocios

Personal details
- Born: Guayaquil,Ecuador
- Education: Azusa Pacific University; Universidad Catolica Santiago de Guayaquil
- Profession: Attorney at Law
- Website: Message from the Chancellor

Sonia Roca is the Chancellor and Founder of Universidad Del Pacífico - Ecuador.

== Biography ==
Sonia Roca is an Ecuadorian attorney, political figure, and founder of Universidad Del Pacifico: Escuela de Negocios.

=== Career ===
==== Political & International Organizations ====
Roca began her career as a maritime attorney in the role of a civilian legal advisor to the Ecuadorian Merchant Marines 1972, and returned in 1977 to direct the creation of the Direction of Maritime Affairs for Ecuador. From 1973 to 1976 she headed the secretariat of the permanent council for the Organization of American States under Secretary General Galo Plaza Lasso. Where she was the Executive Secretaryl for the Interamerican Commission for Women and negotiated in the OAS General Assembly (Atlanta 1974) for the adoption of the International Women's Year 1975.

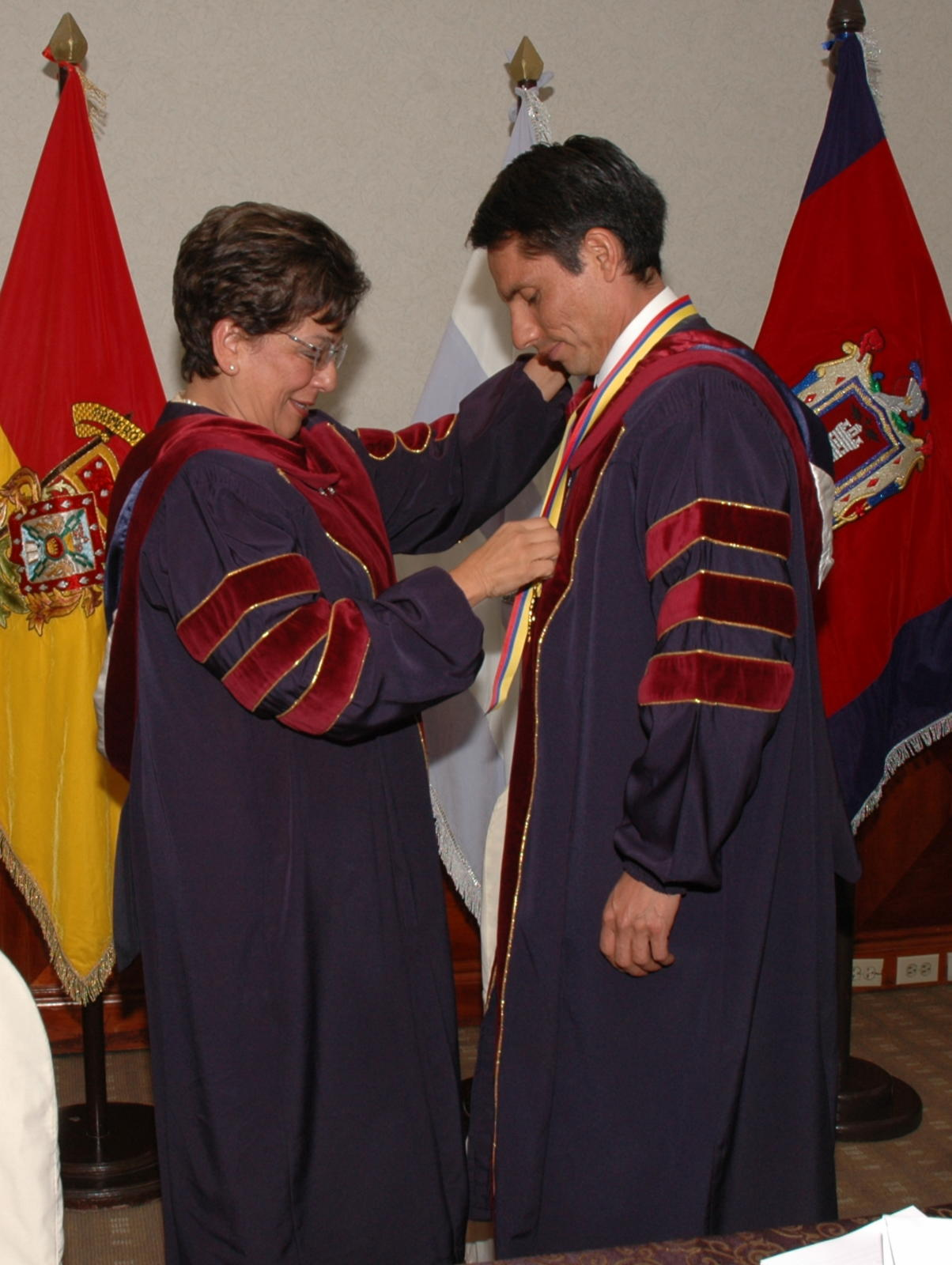
Sonia Roca as Chancellor Universidad Del Pacifico conferred upon Jefferson Perez Doctorate Honoris Causa

During the government of Leon Febres Cordero Roca worked in the secretariat of the Vice Presidency under Blasco Peñaherrera. During this period she worked with the First Lady María Eugenia Cordovez in the operation of the Instituto Nacional del Niño y la Familia (INNFA- National Institute for Family and Children) and the implementation of the Programa de Reducción de la Enfermedad Mortal Infantil (Premi). In 1986 she was appointed as the first female General Intendent of Corporations in the Superintendence of Corporations.

During the presidential elections of 2002 and 2006 she led the electoral campaign for presidential candidate Leon Roldos. In 2007 she was a candidate for the Constitutional Assembly. She was considered as a vice presidential candidate during the 2012 elections.

==== Academia ====
From 1978 to 1996 she was legal advisor to Academia Cotopaxi. In 1988 she became the representative of INCAE Instituto Centro Americano de Administración de Empresas for Ecuador. During her tenure as Executive Director for INCAE/ECUADOR, she proposed the establishment of INCAE's Andean Campus as a component of the PROGRESEC (Policy Dialogue and Consensus Building) project sponsored by USAID. This project's impact was to create a dedicated educational hub in the Andean region. However, this proposal was not embraced by INCAE.

Subsequently, she founded Fundación para el Desarrollo de la Cultura Empresarial (Foundation for the Development of Corporate Culture), which in turn led to the operation of Escuela de Negocios del Pacífico and after approval by the Ecuadorian Congress was enacted into law as Universidad del Pacífico: Escuela de Negocios, continuing her previous commitment to advancing educational opportunities and business development in the region.

==== Social Movement ====
In 2020 Sonia Roca began Nuestro Oceano Pacifico (Our Pacific Ocean) a movement to encourage understanding with regards to the rights and obligations that Ecuadorian citizens have with the Pacific Ocean which consists of a Maritime Citizens Council as well as a think tank.

== Awards and recognitions ==
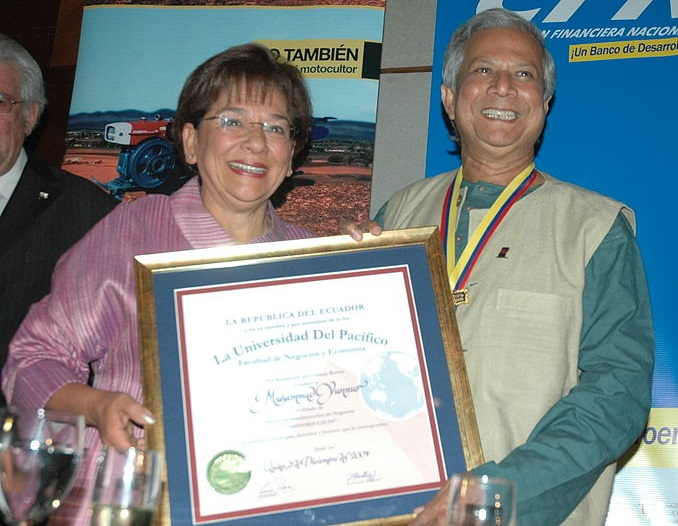
Sonia Roca as Chancellor Universidad Del Pacifico conferred upon Muhammad Yunus Doctorate Honoris Causa

- Mujeres Con Ñeque (Women with Grit) (2023)
- Presea Jaime Nebot Saadi (2021)
- Member of the South South Cooperation Council (SSCC) (2016)
- Academic Excellence Award Amity University (2018)
- Medalla al Merito Educativo Matilde Hidalgo de Procel – Congressional Merit Awarded (2007)
- Ph.D. Honoris Causa – Asia Pacific International University – Canada (2000)
- Member of the Honorary Council for Foreign Affairs
- Member of Board of Directors Quito Chamber of Commerce

== Works ==
- Roca, S. (2019). Una Mirada Ética sobre el Pacífico Latinoamericano. In M. Palacios & D. Soto (Eds.), Pensar un Pacífico Latinoamericano: Retos Políticos, Éticos y Medioambientales (First Edition, pp. 13–17). Introduction, Editorial UPACIFICO ISBN 978-9942-8633-1-7
- Roca, S. (2016). Prologue. In M. Palacios & D. Soto (Eds.), Ecuador País Marítimo: Ensayos sobre Recursos Naturales, Desarrollo y Gobernanza (First Edition, pp. 12–17), Editorial UPACIFICO. ISB: 978-9942-8633-0-0

- Roca, S. (2014). ¿Que Hace el Ecuador fuera de la Alianza del Pacífico? Revista Carácter, 2(1), 23–45.
- Roca, S. (2004). Ecuador: A Vision Toward The APEC. Viña del Mar, Chile; Asia Pacific Economic Cooperation.
- Roca, S. (2002). Inserción del Ecuador a la Cuenca del Pacífico. ¿Qué debemos esperar del nuevo gobierno? Comentario Internacional. Revista Del Centro Andino De Estudios Internacionales, (4), 133–138.
- Roca, S. (1968). La Función Social del Estado (Graduation thesis).

=== Collaborative works ===
- Manual de Contrataciones “Sistema Uniforme de Contrataciones” (General Secretariat OAS)
- United Nations Convention on the Carriage of Goods by Sea (Hamburg, 1978) (the "Hamburg Rules") – Lead Contributor for Latin America
- Índice y anteproyecto del Código de Navegación Marítima y Fluvial (DIMERC) 1972
- Legal Reforms to Ecuadorian Navigation Legislation and new legislation for national maritime interests (DIMERC)
- Revista Jornada de la Navegación, Editor and Promotor (DIMERC).
- Organized three events with international experts and conference editor
