= Marcela Costales =

Ecuadorian historian and politician (1951–2020)

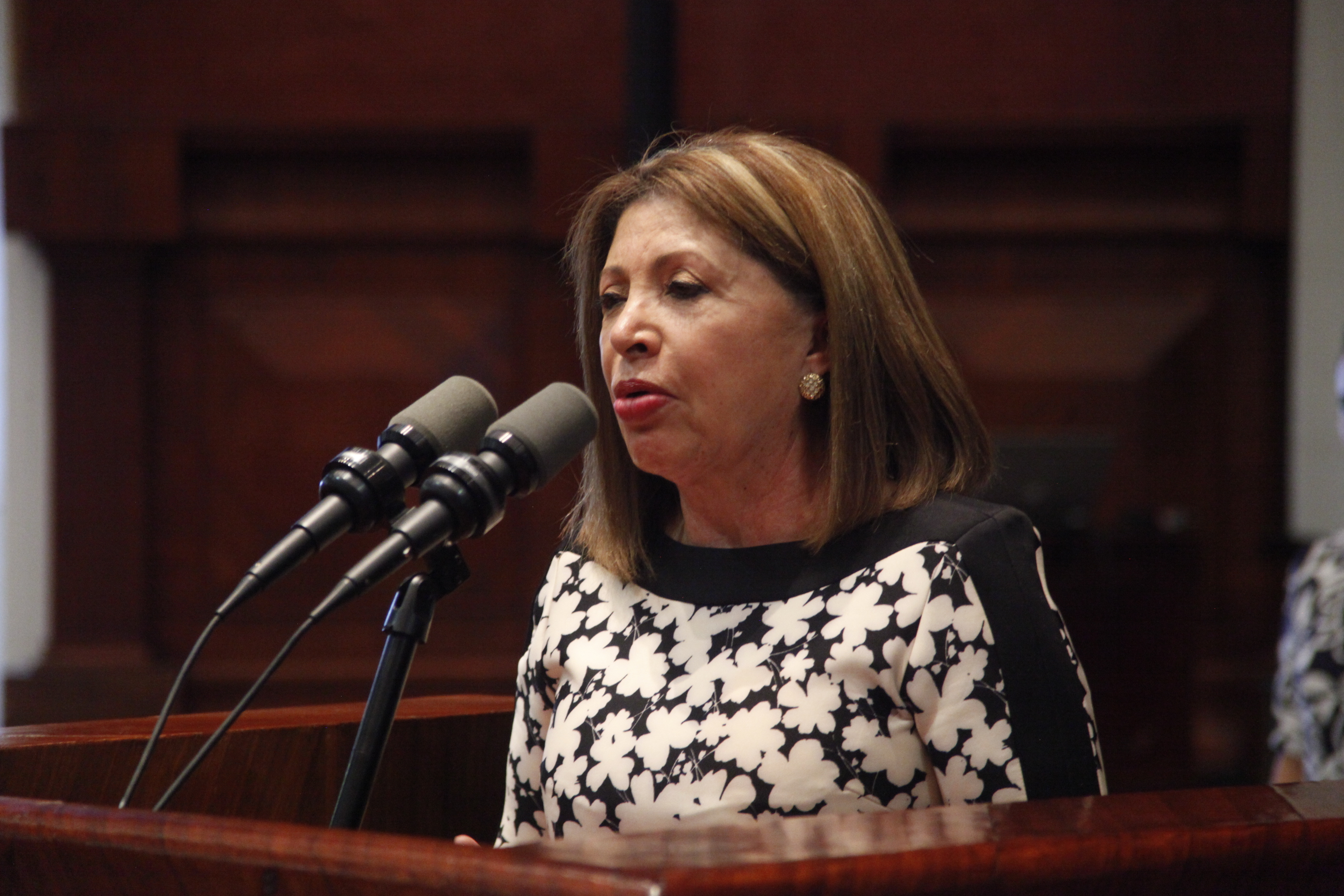
- Born: October 24, 1951; Quito, Ecuador
- Died: June 26, 2020 (aged 68); Quito, Ecuador
- Occupations: Historian and Politician
- Political party: Alianza Pais (2006-2018)
- Website: www.marcelacostales.ec

Laura Marcela Costales Peñaherrera (October 24, 1951 – June 26, 2020) was an Ecuadorian historian and politician. She was viceprefect of Pichincha between 2009 and 2019.

== Biography ==
In 2017 she developed the project "SOS Mujeres Pichincha" (SOS Pichincha Women) from her position in the viceprefecture.

She was vice prefect of the Provincia of Pichincha from 2009 until 2019, during the prefecture of Gustavo Baroja

Costales died on July 28, 2021, at the age of 68 due to consequences of a tumor.

== Published works ==
- Memorial de la ciudad de los espejos
- Mujeres patriotas y precursoras de la libertad : Bicenterario vive la independencia
- Rosa Campusano: biografía

== Awards ==
Doctorate Honoris Causa Universidad Del Pacífico - Escuela de Negocios
