= Las Tres Marías (group) =

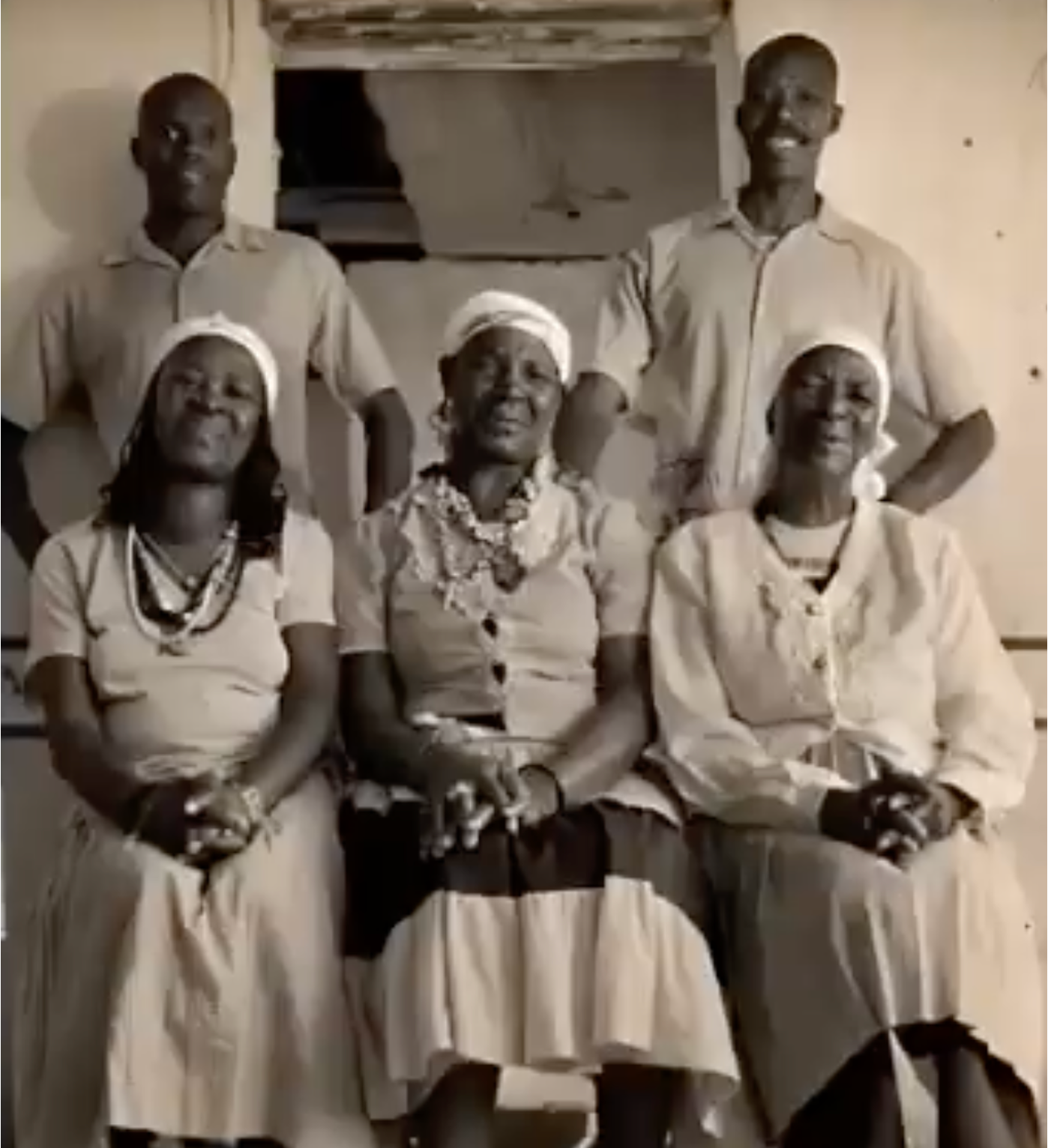

Las Tres Marías were an Afro-Ecuadorian musical trio.

== History ==
Las Tres Marías were made up of sisters Rosa, Gloria and María Magdalena Pavón, recognized for their ability to perform musical ensembles imitating the sounds of trumpets, drums and cornets. They did it with both a cappella, or with elements of nature such as leaves, roots, fruits, trunks, hides and pumpkins, especially La Bomba. This is how they traveled for more than 60 years in Ecuador making their audience dance to the traditional music of Chota Valley.

The sisters were born in the community of Chalguayacu (El Juncal), located in Pimampiro-Imbabura, and came from a family of musicians. Their father, a member of the Banda Mocha, inherited their musical taste mainly from the bomba. The trio began singing at a festival in El Juncal and with the passage of time, they were combining this art with the daily activities they carry out for a living. Rosita, Gloria and Magdalena Pavón - a midwife, farmer and healer - lived in an adobe house in the Chalguayacu neighborhood, Pimampiro Canton, Imbabura Province.

María Magdalena Pavón died in Ibarra on 14 September 2018 at the age of 77.

== Awards and honors ==
- Las Tres Marías were recognized by the Ministry of Culture and Heritage, as the Living Heritage of Ecuador.
- The National Institute of Cultural Heritage (INPC) awarded them recognition in the category Carriers of Knowledge, for contributing to the strengthening and safeguarding of the Intangible Cultural Heritage of Ecuador.
- They are part of the Taitas y Mamas project that brings together icons of Ecuadorian music.
- Las Tres Marías received the ovation at the intercultural festival held in Cali, Colombia in 2009; they stated that "there were thousands of people who stood up and applauded us for more than five minutes".
