= Ham Chot Khwai =

ห้ามจอดควาย (Ham Chot Khwai)

Studio album by Carabao
- Released: 1990
- Recorded: 1990
- Genre: Phleng phuea chiwit
- Length: 46:38
- Labels: Vaew Warn (1990); Warner Music Thailand (2013)
- Producer: Carabao

Carabao chronology
Thap Lang (1988)	ห้ามจอดควาย (Ham Chot Khwai) (1990)	Wi Chaa Pae (1991)

Alternative cover

Ham Chot Khwai (Thai: ห้ามจอดควาย, lit. "Prohibit Buffalo Parking") was the tenth album by Thai rock band, Carabao. It was released in April 1990 in the form of vinyl records and cassette tapes by Vaew Warn. It was the first album released under the name Carabao, after the band members reunited to produce their own solo albums. The album was collaboratively produced with the Wong Tawan band. In Ham chot Khwai, the remaining core original members were left only Yuenyong Opakul (Aed), Preecha Chanapai (Lek), Kirati Promsaka Na Sakon Nakhon (Keo), and Krerkhamphol Prathompattama (Aod).

The album primarily revolves around social satire and critiques of Thai politics, urbanization, and cultural arguments between rural traditions and modern society. The musical arrangements differed from those of the band’s earlier albums. There were also 2 Sam-Cha (Thai: สามช่า, lit. "Thai Cha-Cha-Cha") songs added, Pha Khi Rio (ผ้าขี้ริ้ว) and Kho Khwai Khao Diao (ค.เขาเดียว).

Sanya Na Fon (สัญญาหน้าฝน), the most popular song on the album, is sung by Kirati Promsaka Na Sakon Nakhon (Keo) and has remained his signature song to date.

== Release ==
After the concert tour of Thap Lang album (อัลบัมทับหลัง) in 1989, Carabao faced questions of a possible band breakup. The issue started because of Lek’s first solo album release. Later, Aed, the leader of Carabao, explained that the band had not broken up. It was a temporary break for members’ separate song composing. The main reason for the break was disagreement over producing music together.

During this period, several members released their own solo albums. After that, Carabao reunited under the band’s name with the core members, Aed, Lek, Keo, and Aod, making Carabao well known for Thai music again by the 10th album, Ham Chot Khwai, with the assistance of the Wong Tawan crew.

The album was promoted by the phrase, “ห้ามจอดควายทั่วราชอาณาจักร!” (“Ham Chot Khwai Thua Ratcha Anachak”, lit. “Buffalo Parking is prohibited throughout the kingdom!”), before it was officially released on April 19, 1990, by Vaew Warn, Carabao's label. It was named after its songs’ concepts, which were an implication of Carabao’s experience from the previous year. This album was also the origin of the popular song, Sanya Na Fon (สัญญาหน้าฝน).

The album opened with upbeat tracks like “Pha Khi Rio” (ผ้าขี้ริ้ว) followed by “Dip Daek” (ดิบแดก). These tracks reflected the band’s grassroots character, which had been missing from several of their previous albums. It came with a slogan, เกิดมาจนใครว่าแปลก จกปลาแดกใครว่าเสี่ยว (“Koet Ma Chon Khrai Wa Plaek, Chok Pla Daek Khrai Wa Siao” lit. “Why is being poor seen as strange? And why is digging into fermented fish seen as lame?”). Although the album’s sales response was less compared to the earlier peak era, “Sanya Na Fon” (สัญญาหน้าฝน) successfully brought Keo, the track vocalist in cassette version, regained his social visibility after focusing on background work and internal band management since “Made in Thailand.”

According to Keo (1990), Aed assigned him to sing a song in this album, Sanya Na Fon (สัญญาหน้าฝน). He carefreely agreed. The song had been recorded from 10 a.m. until approximately 3 p.m., and Aed was very excited.

Kho Khwai Khao Diao (ค.เขาเดียว), the band's signature ballad series since “Khi Mao (1981)” (ขี้เมา), has ended in this album with its tenth part as Thuek Khwai Thui Part 10 (ถึกควายทุย ภาค 10). The series consisted of 10 parts following Lek's determination as an affirmation of the band's longevity and clarification from Phleng Phuea Chiwit (Thai: เพลงเพื่อชีวิต, lit. "Songs for Life") fans about who originally created the series.

Not only had this album changed the band's key members, but the songs were also clearly different from Carabao’s previous ones; the sounds were improved, the melody and rhythm were more detailed and delicately made with the collaboration of Wong Tawan in producing music and playing backup.

Moreover, Ham Chot Khwai represents a return to predominantly live drum recording in many years, except for the tracks “Baep Ma Ma” (แบบหมาหมา) and “Pot Haek” (ปอดแหก). The band used a drum machine program with a limited production time. While the criticism was commonly aimed at Wong Tawan for the change, it was in fact Aed Carabao’s vision and initiative.

== Background ==
According to Aed Carabao (April 10, 1990), Sanya Na Fon (สัญญาหน้าฝน) was significantly outstanding with his writing from the perspective of a heartbroken person. No So Sam Ko (นส.3ก.) was also well written by him, coinciding with Lek’s return to reunite and back to the concert tour. Moreover, the song Kawthoolei (กอทูเล) was one of the songs written concerning human rights in Myanmar after he wrote Shan State (ฉานสเตท) from Tham Mue album (อัลบัมทำมือ).

== Distribution ==
Year	Label	Format
1990	Vaew Warn, Sound Sound	Vinyl, Cassette
1997	KRABUE & CO LTD.	CD, Cassette
2011	Warner Music Thailand	CD (30th Carabao anniversary edition)
2012	Warner Music Thailand	Vinyl (Remaster)
2013	Warner Music Thailand	CD (Remaster)

== Tracking List ==
Track	Song Name (Thai)	Song Name (English)	Definition	Length
01	ผ้าขี้ริ้ว	Pha Khi Rio	Rag	4.29
02	ดิบแดก	Dip Daek	Raw Food Eating	4.56
03	กอทูเล	Kawthoolei	Kawthoolei	4.54
04	แบบหมาหมา	Baep Ma Ma	Like a Dog	4.31
05	ค.เขาเดียว (ถึกควายทุย ภาค 10)	Kho Khwai Khao Diao (Thuek Khwai Thui Part 10)	One-Horn Buffalo (Tough Buffalo Part 10)	4.40
06	ปอดแหก	Pot Haek	Coward	4.33
07	สัญญาหน้าฝน	Sanya Na Fon	Rainy Season Promise	4.56
08	คานธี	Khanthi	Mahatma Gandhi	5.21
09	นส.3ก.	No So Sam Ko	Certificate of Land Utilization (N.S.3.)	4.44
10	ต่อไป	To Pai	Next	3.34
Total 46:38

== Personnel ==
=== Band Members ===
Yuenyong Opakul (Aed) - guitar, vocals, backing vocals

Kirati Promsaka Na Sakon Nakhon (Keo) - guitar, vocals, backing vocals

Preecha Chanapai (Lek) - guitar, vocals, backing vocals

Krerkhamphol Prathompattama (Aod) - bass, vocals

=== Backup from Wong Tawan ===
Wongsakorn Rassamitat (Ton) - drums, backing vocals

Pongprom Snitwong Na Ayutthaya (Poom) - keyboards, backing vocals

Marutha Rattanasamphan (Prince) - percussion, harmonica, guitar, backing vocals

Kitiphan Punkabutra (Moo) - guitar, backing vocals

== Critical reception ==
Ham Chot Khwai received a significant amount of attention from fans at the time as it was the first comeback of the band. The cassette distributed by Vaew Warn proved to be successful in the market. However, there were numerous fans criticizing the involvement of Wong Tawan in Ham Chot Khwai album as disturbing the original Carabao songs. On the other hand, Pongprom Wong Tawan mentioned that Wong Tawan only worked as the arranger in the album, which directly followed Aed Carabao’s vision. He said that he was not particularly affected by the criticism because everyone in the team knew what truly happened in the project. Aed came with a disk full of drafts and information, proving Carabao was not an ordinary grassroot Phuea Chiwit band by working with McIntosh (แมคอินทอช) and presaving it in the disk to the recording room (Pongprom Snitwong's Fan Page, 2007)

According to Aed Carabao (2007), before Wong Tawan collaborated, he had already written songs like Rak Tong Su (รักต้องสู้) and Sanya Na Fon (สัญญาหน้าฝน). During the time, computers first emerged and he became obsessed with it, using a computer composed of a keyboard since the start of the day. He wrote the lyrics, then melody, which made the songs come out beautifully, yet he was eventually bored of it and changed it back to guitar.
