= Krirkkampon Prathompatama =

- เกริกกำพล ประถมปัทมะ
- Born: Anupong Prathompatama; 14 June 1951 (age 75); Surin, Thailand
- Other names: "Odd Carabao" (Thai: อ๊อด คาราบาว)
- Occupations: Singer; Musician
- Musical career
- Genres: Folk rock; Rock; Country; Acoustic; Blues; Phleng phuea chiwit; Rhythm and Blues; Funk; Disco; Soul
- Instrument: Bass guitar · Backing vocals
- Years active: 1970s–present
- Formerly of: The President

Krirkkampon Prathompatama (Thai: เกริกกำพล ประถมปัทมะ, born June 14, 1951), formerly known as Anupong Prathompatama (อนุพงษ์ ประถมปัทมะ) and better known as Odd Carabao, is best known as the bassist of Carabao, one of Thailand's legendary rock bands. He was previously the bassist for the disco-funk band The President. His signature song with Carabao is Krathang Dokmai Hai Khun ("A Flowerpot for You").

== Music career ==
Krirkkampon or Odd was the bassist for The President, a popular disco-funk band in the late 1970s, which also featured Preecha Chanapai, better known as Lek, on guitar. Later, he and Lek had the opportunity to work with Carabao, and were subsequently invited by Yuenyong Opakul, better known as Add, the band's founder and leader, to join the group. Both Lek and Odd agreed to the offer, and Lek left The President. However, Odd was still under a touring contract with the band, so for Carabao's fourth studio album, Th. Thahaan Ot Thon (ท.ทหารอดทน, "The Long-suffering Soldier") in 1983, the bass duties were instead handled by Phairat Phoemchalat.

After completing his touring commitments, Odd officially joined Carabao as a full-time member. He made his debut with the band on their fifth studio album, Made in Thailand (เมดอินไทยแลนด์), released in late 1984. The album became a cultural phenomenon, selling as many as 5,000,000 copies, with nearly every song becoming widely popular. It is widely regarded as the album that truly established Carabao as a major force in Thai music. On February 9, 1985, the band held a major concert titled Tham Doi Khon Thai (ทำโดยคนไทย, "Made by Thais'") at the Velodrome inside the Hua Mak Sports Complex in Bangkok. The concert drew an enormous audience of approximately 60,000 people.

Although his primary role in Carabao was as the bassist and a backing vocalist rather than a lead singer, Add, as the band's songwriter, wrote a song specifically for him to sing: Krathang Dokmai Hai Khun (กระถางดอกไม้ให้คุณ, "A Flowerpot for You"). It was the opening track of the album Welcome to Thailand (เวลคัมทูไทยแลนด์), released in 1987. With its light, easygoing music and playful lyrics, the song humorously poked fun at Odd's own life. Although he was a music lover who enjoyed listening to music and playing musical instruments, he was not particularly good at singing. Even after secretly practicing in an attempt to improve his singing, he only ended up annoying his neighbors. One night, while he was practicing his singing at midnight, his neighbors shouted at him and threw a flowerpot that landed right in front of him, as reflected in the song's title. The song eventually became his signature song. He went on to sing two more songs: Pod Haek (ปอดแหก, "Coward") on the 1990 album Haam Chot Khwaai (ห้ามจอดควาย, "No Buffalo Parking"), and Lung Ri (ลุงหริ, "Uncle Ri") on the 1991 album Wi Chaa Pae (วิชาแพะ, "The Scapegoat Lessons").

== Personal life ==
He married his wife, who is of Thai-American descent. The couple had their first child relatively late in life, with Odd aged 59 and his wife 42 at the time. Their eldest daughter, Panisara "Phleng" Prathompatama, is a singer who has also appeared in television dramas and works as an online influencer. Their younger son is 12 years younger than his sister. Odd lives with his family in Phra Nakhon Si Ayutthaya, where Papa Café is located. The café and bakery was established as a family business, with Odd and his wife investing in the venture and setting it up for their daughter to run.

In the film Young Bao The Movie released in 2013 with a story about Carabao in the beginning. His character was represented by Pitisak Yaowananon.
