= Made in Thailand (song) =

Single by Carabao
- Released: 1984
- Recorded: Sri Siam Studio
- Genre: Phuea Chiwit
- Length: 4.10 minutes
- Songwriter: Yuenyong Opakul
- Producer: Yuenyong Opakul

Made in Thailand was composed by Yuenyong Opakul (Aed Carabao) and appears on Carabao’s fifth studio album, Made in Thailand, released in 1984.

== History ==
Yuenyong composed the song following a suggestion from Paiboon Damrongchaitham, Managing Director of Grammy Entertainment, who proposed writing a song to encourage support for Thai-made products amid the widespread use of imported goods, in line with government policy under then-Prime Minister General Prem Tinsulanonda. Musically, the band incorporated both Khlui and Flutes, inspired by a fusion jazz piece noted by the then-band’s manager, Bee Del Rosario. The song was completed and released in late 1984 as the title track of the album Made in Thailand, with Grammy overseeing its promotion.

== Released and Success ==
When this song was released, it quickly gained popularity, leading to the album selling over 5 million copies. This is considered Carabao's most famous album during their classic era with all seven members present. Part of this success was the "Made by Thai People" concert at the Velodrome in Hua Mak Stadium, and it marked the first time Carabao became involved with a government agency. They initially produced a music video to promote the use of domestically produced goods, but this did not involve promoting the album itself.

The song has also been well received by international audiences due to its universal themes, contributing to the band's recognition in several countries, including the United States. As a result, Carabao released an alternative version titled “Made in Thailand in USA,” which incorporates English lyrics aimed at an American audience. The English vocals were performed by Thierry Mekwattana, while Yuenyong continued to sing the Thai version, with minor alterations to the first verse, including improvised spoken lines.

Later, the same song was produced in various versions, with modifications to the lyrics to suit economic conditions or times, but retaining the original musical structure, using Khlui as a symbol representing Thailand.

- First version: Made in Thailand (Original) / 1984
- Second version: Made in Thailand in USA / 1985. The Thai lyrics remained the same. Later included in the Carabao compilation album in 1986.
- Third version: Made in Thailand '40 / 1997, in the album "Senthang Sai Pla Daek" (The Fermented Fish Paste Route). The lyrics were completely changed, and the music was enhanced with a brass section, female chorus, and spoken words mentioning the song's 12th anniversary.
