= Kirati Promsaka na Sakon Nakhon =

Thai musician (born 1952)

- กีรติ พรหมสาขา ณ สกลนคร
- Born: 25 January 1952 (age 74); Bangkok, Thailand
- Other names: "Keo Carabao" (Thai: เขียว คาราบาว)
- Occupations: Singer; Musician; Audio engineer; Record producer
- Musical career
- Genres: Folk rock; Rock; Country; Acoustic; Blues; Phleng phuea chiwit; Rhythm and Blues
- Instrument: Vocal · Guitar · Keyboard · Percusion
- Years active: 1977–present
- Formerly of: Carabao

Kirati Promsaka na Sakon Nakhon (Thai: กีรติ พรหมสาขา ณ สกลนคร, born January 25, 1952), also widely known by his stage name Keo (Note: Also spelled Khiao.) Carabao (เขียว คาราบาว) is a Thai singer, musician and sound engineer. Known as one of the members of Carabao. He is a pioneering member of the band alongside Yuenyong Opakul or Aed Carabao.

== Biography ==
=== Early life ===
Kirati or Keo was born in Bangkok's Thonburi side. He grew up being raised by his mother who was a teacher. His father died when he was four years old. Keo graduated from high school from Suankularb Wittayalai School. Originally he liked playing football very much and had the potential to be a skilled footballer. Keo turned to music and started from guitar after being taught by his senior footballer friend who was also a musician. His mother didn't approve of it at all and did her best to dissuade him, but he tried to run away from home to play music. (Note: Keo's mother died in 1983, right around the time Carabao released their third album, Waniphok (วณิพก, "The Wandering Minstrel").)

=== Carabao member ===
He co-founded Carabao in the Philippines together with two fellow Thai students were Yuenyoung Opakul or Aed and Sanit Limsila or Khai, while traveling to study at Mapúa Institute of Technology (modern-day Mapúa University or MU) in 1977.

In 1981, after graduation Keo had returned to Thailand. He worked as an engineer for a Filipino company that opened a branch in Thailand, along with playing music with Aed on behalf of Carabao. At the end of that same year, Carabao released their first album titled Khii Maw (ขี้เมา, "The Drunken"). In this album, he was one of the two who wrote the song Mon Phleng Kharabao (มนต์เพลงคาราบาว, "Magical Songs of Carabao") with Aed, the first Carabao's song.

He membered Carabao until their 10th album Haam Chot Khwaai (ห้ามจอดควาย, "No Buffalo Parking") in 1990 when he left the band. In this album, there was one song that he sung Sanya Na Fon (สัญญาหน้าฝน, "Rainy Season Promise"), with lyrics by Aed Carabao. It was successful and became his signature song.

He released his first album Kor Kuan (ก่อกวน, "Troll") in the same year, Mai Khoei (ไม่เคย, "Ne'er"), one song in this album with composed by Aed Carabao. It was another of his well-known songs.

Even though Keo left Carabao more than 30 years ago and has never returned to being a member again, he has come back to join the band, such as participating in some albums or big concerts, etc.

== Personal life ==
After leaving Carabao, Keo continues to work in the music industry as a solo artist, and used to open two steak houses in Ram Inthra and Lat Krabang neighbourhoods for approximately 20 years with a passion for cooking. In 2001, he was the producer for Sip Lor, a rock band with Chulachak Chakrabongse or Hugo as lead singer.

He is married and has two children. His daughter is Kirata Promsaka na Sakon Nakhon or Ki was a member of Niece, teen pop duo that active in late 1990s under Dojo City in the network of Bakery Music.

In the film Young Bao The Movie released in 2013 with a story about Carabao in the beginning. His character was represented by Pawarith Monkolpisit.
