= Pongsit Kampee =

Thai rock singer and producer

Pongsit Kamphee
- พงษ์สิทธิ์ คำภีร์
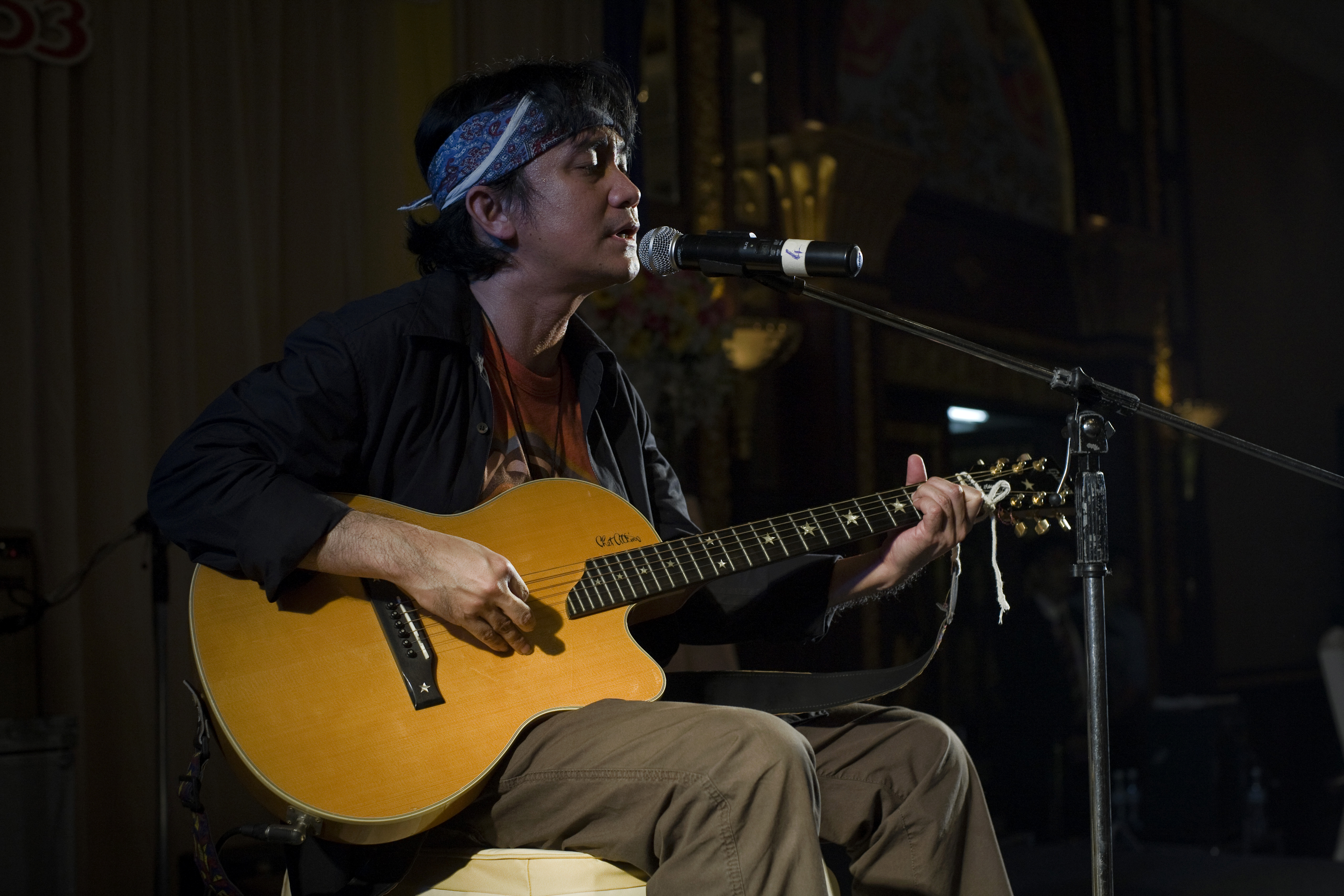
- Pongsit in 2010
- Born: November 2, 1967 (age 58); Nong Khai, Thailand
- Other names: Pu
- Occupations: Singer; songwriter; musician; record producer
- Years active: 1987–present
- Musical career
- Origin: Khon Kaen, Thailand
- Genres: Phleng phuea chiwit; country rock; folk rock
- Instruments: Vocals; guitar; mouth organ
- Labels: Buffalo Head; Rod Fai Dontri; M Square; Khor; Kantana; Siang Kamphee; Caravan Studio; Medias Music; Sony; Warner; D-Day

Pongsit "Pu" Kampee (Thai: พงษ์สิทธิ์ คำภีร์) is a Thai rock singer and producer popular in the pleng phuea chiwit (Songs for Life) genre. Inspired by Preecha Chanapai of Carabao and Surachai Jantimathawn of Caravan.

== Life and career ==
=== Early life ===
Pu Pongsit Kampee was born in Mueng district in Nongkhai province on May 2, 1967. He is the youngest son in his family and Mr. Somsak is his older brother and Mrs. Saowalak is his older sister. His father, Mr. Sutchai, is a carpenter and his mother Ms. Somphon, is a practical nurse. Both of them work at a hospital near their home. He attended kindergarten and primary education at the Wat Arun Rang Si School and was later educated at a lower secondary school at the Thep Witthayakhan School. Pongsit decided to study at the Thai-Germany Technical Institute in Khon Kaen province but he must have been disappointed because he did not pass the test. So he decided to study in North Eastern Technological college in Khon Kaen province. One year later he applied to Thai-Germany Technical Institute again and this time he succeeded. While he studied he also joined the soccer team and practice his guitar skill. He also wrote a song by his own. At that time he had opportunities to join with a senior band name "retired" and that was first step to be musician in his life.

=== Music career ===
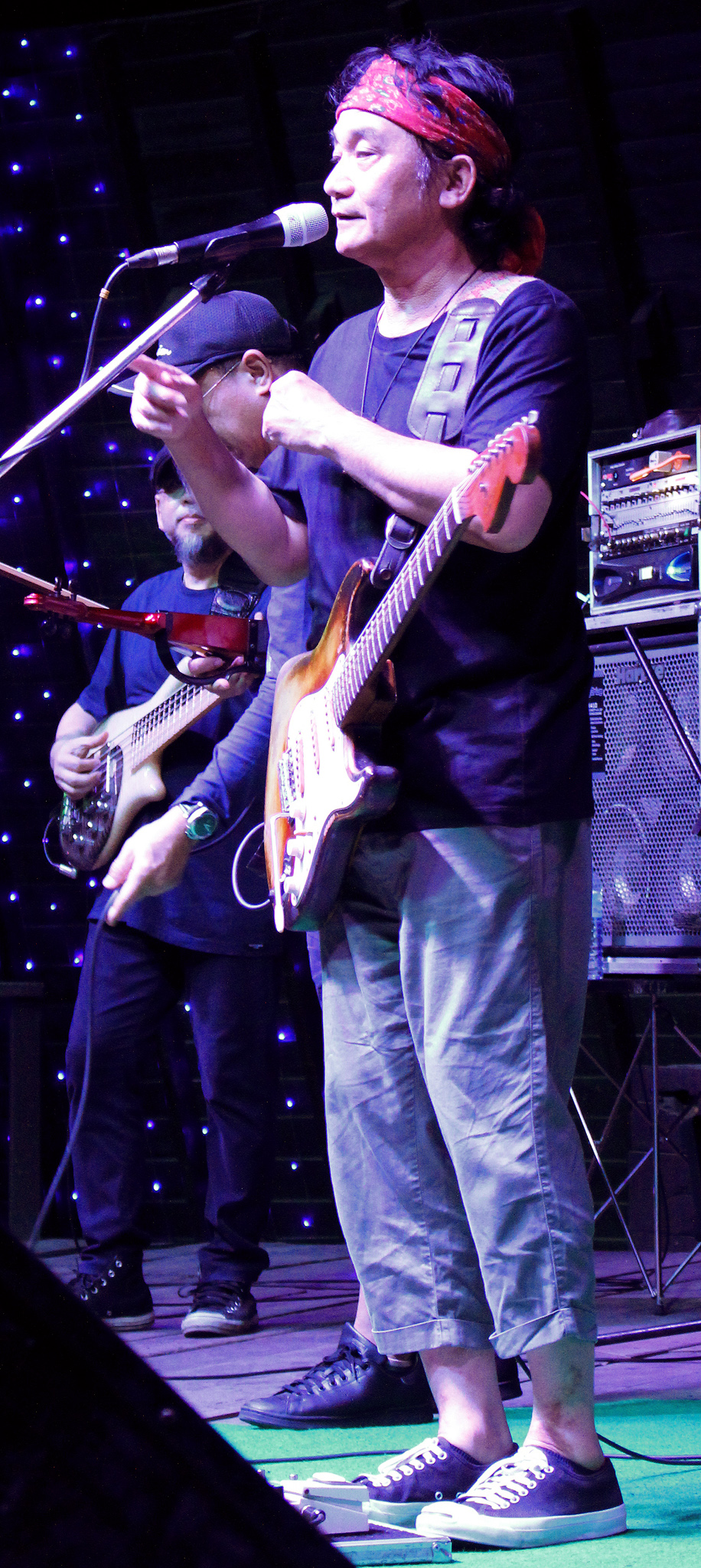
Pongsit "Pu" Kamphee with band performing at The Green Mango Club, Ko Samui, 8th July 2022.

After being educated at the Technical Institute, Pongsit decided to go to Bangkok with the dream of being a musician. Pongsit got the inspiration to be a musician since his studies in primary school and from his favorite musicians Nga Caravan (Surachai Chanthimathon) and Lek Carabao (Pricha Chanaphai). So, Caravan the band was the first target and first step for him to be real musician. However, he joined the band as a backup bass player got the chance to play in an open show for the band. Finally, released his first solo album in 1987 titled "Thueng Phuean," on contract with Buffalo Head Company, and this album included a famous song named "Thueng Phuean"

Pongsit became famous in 1990 with the album "Sua Tua Thee 11". At that time the kind of music Pongsit played (Phleng Pheua Chiwit) was still popular, and he had good vocals with a very high pitch and clear identity. Therefore, when this album was released, feedback from fans was really good. So this gave Pongsit more inspiration, and he continued to create other albums. 1992 was a peak year for him with album "Ma Tam Sanya" and the very famous songs "Sutchai," "Thai Thoe Khuen Ma" and "Ma Tam Sanya." Finally, he was given the names in "Phleng Pheua Chiwit 3rd Legend" and "Chaopho Phleng Rak Phuea Chiwit"

== Phleng Pheua Chiwit Legend 3rd ==
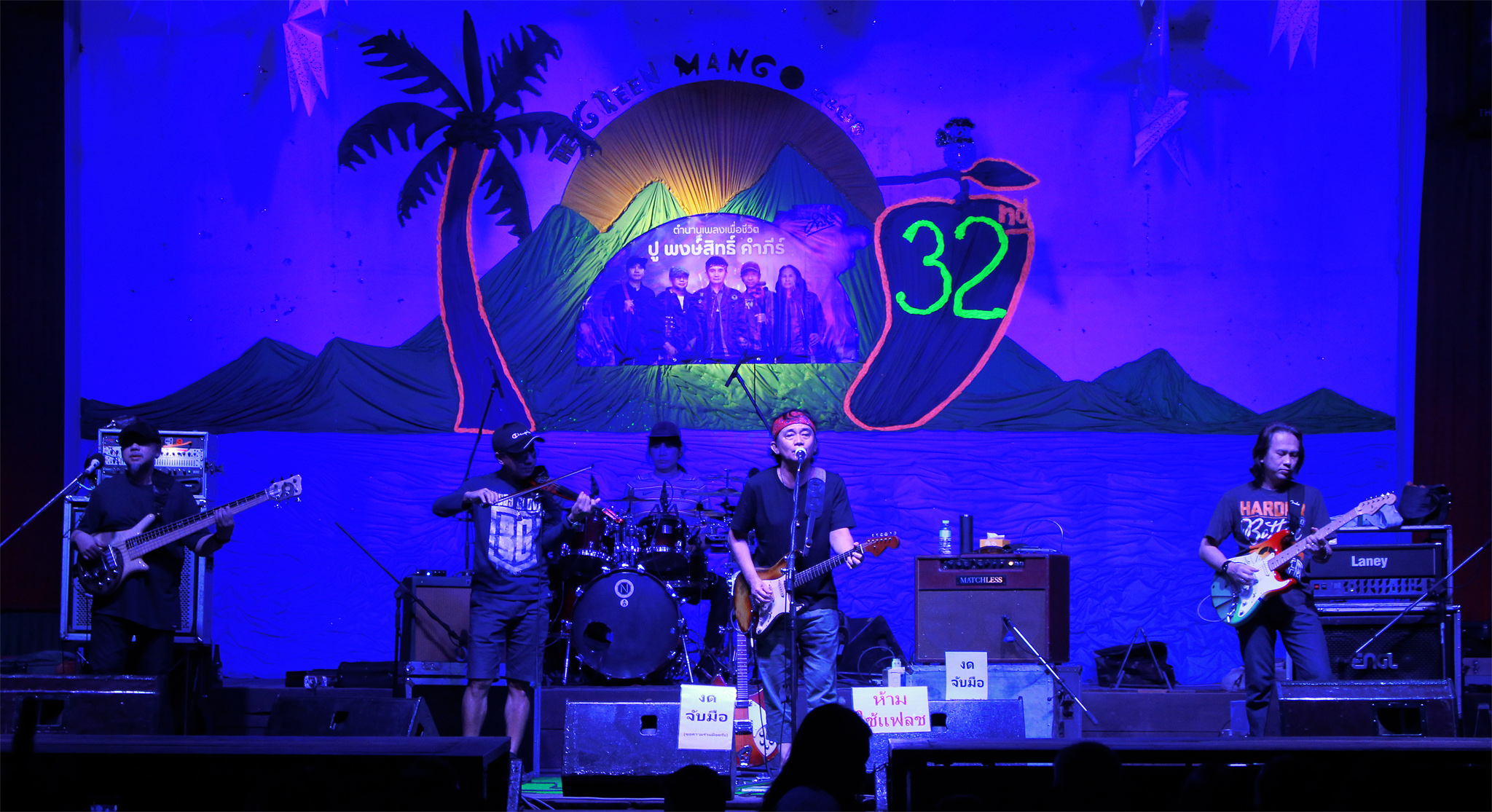
Pongsit "Pu" Kamphee with band performing at Green Mango Club, Ko Samui, 8 July 2022

Kampee well-known since in 1990 from the song "Ta Lod Wela" from album Sua Tua Thee 11 were a released by Rod Fai Don Tri.Also he produced music in a drama series named "Ta Wan Shing prob" and this song contained was featured in album Bun Terk Karn Dern Tang but it had been removed later. Because of copyright (music licensing ) problem. So Pongsit take song replace it with the song "Rong rien khong noo". The songs that were popular after he released the album were " Kid tung", "Rong rien Khong noo", "tur phn siasala", "sais sok "and "mae".

Pongsit's nickname is "Pu". Some people call him "Kampee" by surname that he call himself. In 1992 Kampee released album "Ma tam sanya" (came as promised) and it had popular song "Sutchi"(deep in mind), "Thai thoe khuen Ma"(Take her back) and "Ma tam sanya" (came as promised ). In this album he had opportunities to work with his favorite artist "Lek carabao". In that year Pongsit had been the most popular then people called him "Phleng Pheua Chiwit Legend" or "The godfather of Pheua Chiwit love song".

Pongsit Kampee has a melodic tone, Echo tremolo in his own style. His song that still popular is adagio that had story about love and lonely etc. The fast rhythm that popular is "Num Noi"( young boy), "Yot Chai"(Great man), "Thong Di Thong Khe "(Gold and Find gold), "Nek Sawaengha"(seeker), "Mo hai Arai"(What the university give to you?), "Ik Khon Nueng"(Another one), "Banthuek Khon Doen Thanon"(Diary of the street man), "Raeng Yong Mi"( Still have the force ).

Currently, the music in Thailand has been changed in style. Therefore, the popularity of Pongsit has fallen. But he still recording new songs. In 2012 Pongsit released a new album named "25 year (still have hope)", for celebrated 25 year of his music road. He performed live at popular music festival, Wonderfruit in Pattaya in December 2015.

== Discography ==
=== Studio albums ===
- Terng Pern (ถึงเพื่อน) (1987) (Cassette/CD/LP) *Vol.1[2530] *New Cover and Record (CD)
- Sua Tua Thee 11 (เสือตัวที่ ๑๑) (1990) (Cassette/CD/LP)
- Bun Terk Karn Dern Tang (บันทึกการเดินทาง) (1991) (Cassette/CD/LP)
- Ma Tam Sanya (มาตามสัญญา) (1992) (Cassette/CD/LP)
- Yoo Trong Nee (อยู่ตรงนี้) (1993) (Cassette/CD/LP)
- Row Ja Klap Ma (เราจะกลับมา) (1994) (Cassette/VHS/CD/LP)
- Yak Kern Sawan (อยากขึ้นสวรรค์) (1995) (Cassette/CD/Mini LP)
- Sen Tang Sai Kao (เส้นทางสายเก่า) (1996) (Cassette/CD)
- Kam Nerng Terng Ban (คำนึงถึงบ้าน) (1997) (Cassette/CD/Mini LP)
- Sud Jai Fun (สุดใจฝัน) (1998) (Cassette/CD)
- Somchai Dee (สมชายดี) (1999) (Cassette/CD/Mini LP)
- Chiwit Yang Mee Wang (ชีวิตยังมีหวัง) (2000) (Cassette/CD/Mini LP)
- Tai Duang Tawan (ใต้ดวงตะวัน) (2001) (Cassette/CD/VCD)
- Samunchon (สามัญชน) (2003) (Cassette/CD/VCD)
- Prachachon Tem Kun (ประชาชนเต็มขั้น) (2005) (Cassette/CD/VCD)
- Bun Terk Kon Bon Tanon (บันทึกคนบนถนน) (2006) (Cassette/CD/VCD)
- Wan Mai (วันใหม่) (2007) (Cassette/CD/VCD)
- 25 Pi Me Wang (25ปี มีหวัง) (2012) (CD)
- Gae Gub Chan (แกกับฉัน) (2016) (CD)

=== Live albums ===
- Acoustic Live "Concert Nee Mai Mee Ngow" with Nga Caravan (1991) (Cassette/CD/VCD/LP)
- Pid Perd Sanya(1993) (Cassette/CD/VCD/LP)
- Unplugged [Plug Lood] With Lek Carabao (1993) (VCD)
- Acoustic Live "Dontree, Klangjang, Phadang & Kampee" (1994) (Cassette/VHS/CD/LP)
- The Forest Protection Fund Concert "Classical Element"(1995) (Cassette)
- "3 Generation of Songs For Life" Orchestra.[BSO] with Nga Caravan & Aed Carabao (1998) (Cassette/VHS/CD/VCD)
- FESPIC Games Bangkok '99 (1999) (Cassette/CD)
- Hua Jai Si Kao [Stop AIDS] (2000) (Cassette/CD)
- 15th Anniversary Kampee Temkan (2002) (VCD)
- Thailand Intellectual Property Festival (2002) (CD/VCD)
- "Sahai" with Su Boonleng & Bob Ritthiporn (2003) (VCD)
- 19 Kao 20 "Suer Aork Lai" Special Guests : Nga Caravan, Tanis Sriglindee, Lek Carabao, Fon Tanasoontorn.(2006) (Cassette/CD/VCD/DVD)
- "Huk Siew" Special Guests : Nga Caravan, Lek Carabao, Aed Carabao, Apartment Kunpah, Palmy. (2009) (CD/VCD/DVD)
- Take Our Country Back. "Aow Prated Thai Kong Row Kern Ma" (2009) (CD)
- Acoustic Live "Poo...Yark Rong" (2009) (CD/VCD/DVD)
- "Yoo Yang Singh" Special Guests : Lek Carabao, Chatree Kongsuwan, Nga Caravan, Pun Phaiboonkiet.(2010) (VCD/DVD)
- Live by Request @ Saxophone (2011) (VCD/DVD)
- "3 Generation of Songs For Life" with Nga Caravan & Aed Carabao (2012) (VCD/DVD)
- Pongsit Kampee 25 Pi Me Wang (2013) (VCD/DVD)
- Plug Lood 2 With Lek Carabao (2013) (CD/VCD/DVD)
- Pleng Rak (2014) (VCD/DVD)

=== Compilation albums ===
- Chiwit Kab Wela Vol.1–2 (Cassette/VHS/CD/VCD/LD/LP)
- Chiwit Kwamrak Kwamfun Vol.1–3 (Cassette/CD)
- Keang Kang Sang Fun Vol.1–3 (Cassette/CD/VCD)
- "Jak...Kampee" Including VCD 4 Tracks (Cassette/CD)
- Ruam Sood Yod Phleng Pheua Chiwit Vol.1 (Cassette/CD)
- Ruam Sood Yod Phleng Pheua Chiwit (Cassette/CD)
- 15th Anniversary Kampee Pleng chewit – Greatest Hits Collections. Vol.1–2 (Cassette/CD/DVD)
- Buntuek Pleng Chewit – 16 Greatest Hits Collection. (CD/VCD)
- Klin Din Klin Ya (Cassette/CD/VCD)
- Buntuek Khon Dern Tarng. 20 Tracks + 5 Bonus Tracks. (CD/VCD)
- Best Hits Sood Chewit/Sood Rak/Sood Mun (CD Box Set/VCD Box Set)
- The Best of Kampee (CD)
- Dee Tee Sood Vol.1–3 (VCD)
- Ruam Hit 25th Anniversary Pongsit Kampee Vol.1 (DVD)
- Ruam Hit 25th Anniversary Pongsit Kampee Rakkun...Ta Lod Wela (CD)
- 25th Anniversary Pongsit Kampee (CD Box Set)

=== Special albums ===
- Plug Lood [Unplugged] (CD/Cassette/LP)
- Pleng Caravan Tamnan Chiwit (CD/VCD/Cassette/LP)
- Jai Kern Roy (CD/Cassette/Mini LP)
- Kortodtee Rob Ni Mai Mee 3 Cha (Cassette/CD)
- Kampee 3 Cha (Cassette/CD)
- Puk Guy Puk Jai (Cassette/CD/VCD)
- Kampee Luktoong Vol.1–2 (Cassette/CD/VCD)
- "Suer Pop Sing" with Pongthep Kradonchumnarn (Cassette/CD/VCD)
- "Sahai" with Su Boonleng & Bob Ritthiporn (Cassette/CD/VCD)
- Wan Puk Pleng Chiwit Vol.1–2 with Pongthep Kradonchumnarn & Nga Caravan (Cassette/CD/VCD/DVD)
- Carava Caravan (Cassette/CD)
- Carava Carabao (Cassette/CD)
- Pra Jao Hua Foo (Cassette/CD)

=== MP3 Format albums ===
- MP3- Kampee Pleng Dung Hang Toswas # Pheua Chiwit Vol. 1
- MP3- 20th Anniversary
- MP3- In Love
- MP3- On The Rock
- MP3- 25th Anniversary Vol.1–2
- MP3- "3 Generation of Songs For Life" with Nga Caravan & Aed Carabao
- MP3- Pongsit on Stage
- MP3- Pleng Rak
- MP3- "3 Generation of Music For Life" with Nga Caravan & Pongthep Kradonchumnarn
- MP3- Pheua Chiwit Hit Serng Serng
- MP3- Bun Terk 50 Phleng Chiwit
- MP3- Kampee Collection (Box Set)
- MP3- Kern Hing
- MP3- Ruam Phon Pheua Chiwit
- MP3- Kid Tueng Talod Wela Vol. 1-2
- MP3- Racha 3 Cha Non Stop
- MP3- Loog Thung Puer Chewit Hit Marathon - Vol.3
- MP3- The Best Of Kampee
- MP3- Code HIts
- MP3- Double Hits - Pongsit & Pongthep
