= Phongthep Kradonchamnan =

Thai Phleng phuea chiwit singer

- พงษ์เทพ กระโดนชำนาญ
- Born: 18 September 1953 (age 72); Nakhon Ratchasima, Nakhon Ratchasima, Thailand
- Occupation: Singer
- Musical career
- Genres: Phleng phuea chiwit; Luk thung
- Years active: 1975–present
- Label: Azona • GMM Grammy • Warner Music Thailand

Phongthep Kradonchamnan (Thai: พงษ์เทพ กระโดนชำนาญ) is a Thai Phleng phuea chiwit singer.

== Life ==
His nickname is Moo (Thai: หมู, "Pig"), and he was born in Nakhon Ratchasima Province on 18 September 1953. In 1975, he started his career as an entertainer with the first generation members of Phleng phuea chiwit band, Caravan. Following the 6 October 1976 massacre at Sanam Luang and Thammasat University, during which many students and intellectuals fled to join the Communist Party of Thailand, he and the members of Caravan also went into the jungle and joined the movement. They remained there until returning in 1981.

Later, he also toured with another Phleng phuea chiwit band Carabao and performed alongside its members, although he was not an official member of the band. He also performed at Carabao's first major concert, "Tham Doei Khon Thai" (Made by Thai People), held on 9 February 1986 at the Huamark Velodrome, in front of an audience of more than 60,000 people.

He became a solo singer in 1983.

=== Entertainers ===
He started his career as a solo singer in 1983. His first album was Huay Taleang (Thai: ห้วยแถลง), and he has been popular since. Included in his first album were several popular songs such as Tang Kae (Thai: ตังเก), Ton Kab Kee (Thai: ต้นขับขี่), Fon Nang Jang Hay (Thai: ฝนนางจางหาย), Ko Ra Cha (Thai: โคราชา), Khon Kab Maa (Thai: คนกับหมา), Kid Tueng Ban (Thai: คิดถึงบ้าน), Nam Ta Hoy Tak (Thai: น้ำตาหอยทาก), Lom Ram Poey (Thai: ลมรำเพย), etc. Most of his songs were composed by him. The lyrics are more poetry like, some are very political, and advocate for working class and poverty, which later gave him the nickname Farmer's Poet (Thai: กวีศรีชาวไร่).

== Discography ==
=== Albums ===
- Huay Taleang (ห้วยแถลง) (1983)
- Dieaw (เดี่ยว) (1985)
- I am Isan (ไอแอมอีสาน) (1986)
- Mun Dee (มันดี) (1986)
- Trong Sen Khob Faa (ตรงเส้นขอบฟ้า) (1986)
- Yim Ngao Ngao (ยิ้มเหงาๆ) (1988)
- khon Jon Run Mai (คนจนรุ่นใหม่) (1990)
- Jor Poe Loe Jeen Pon Lao (จ.ป.ล. จีนปนลาว) (1991)
- Khon Thee Rao Rak (คนที่เรารัก) (1992)
- Supermarket (ซุเปอร์มาร์เกต) (1994)
- Maa Hai Ban Kert (มาให้บ้านเกิด) (1996)
- Dok Nguea Phuea Chiwit (ดอกเหงื่อเพื่อชีวิต) (1998)
- Jao Sao Phee Suea (เจ้าสาวผีเสื้อ) (2000)
- Khai Ngwea Song Kwai Riean (ขายงัวส่งควายเรียน) (2006)
- Mon Kan Mueng (มนต์การเมือง) (2010)
