= Preecha Chanapai =

Thai musician and singer (born 1955)

- ปรีชา ชนะภัย
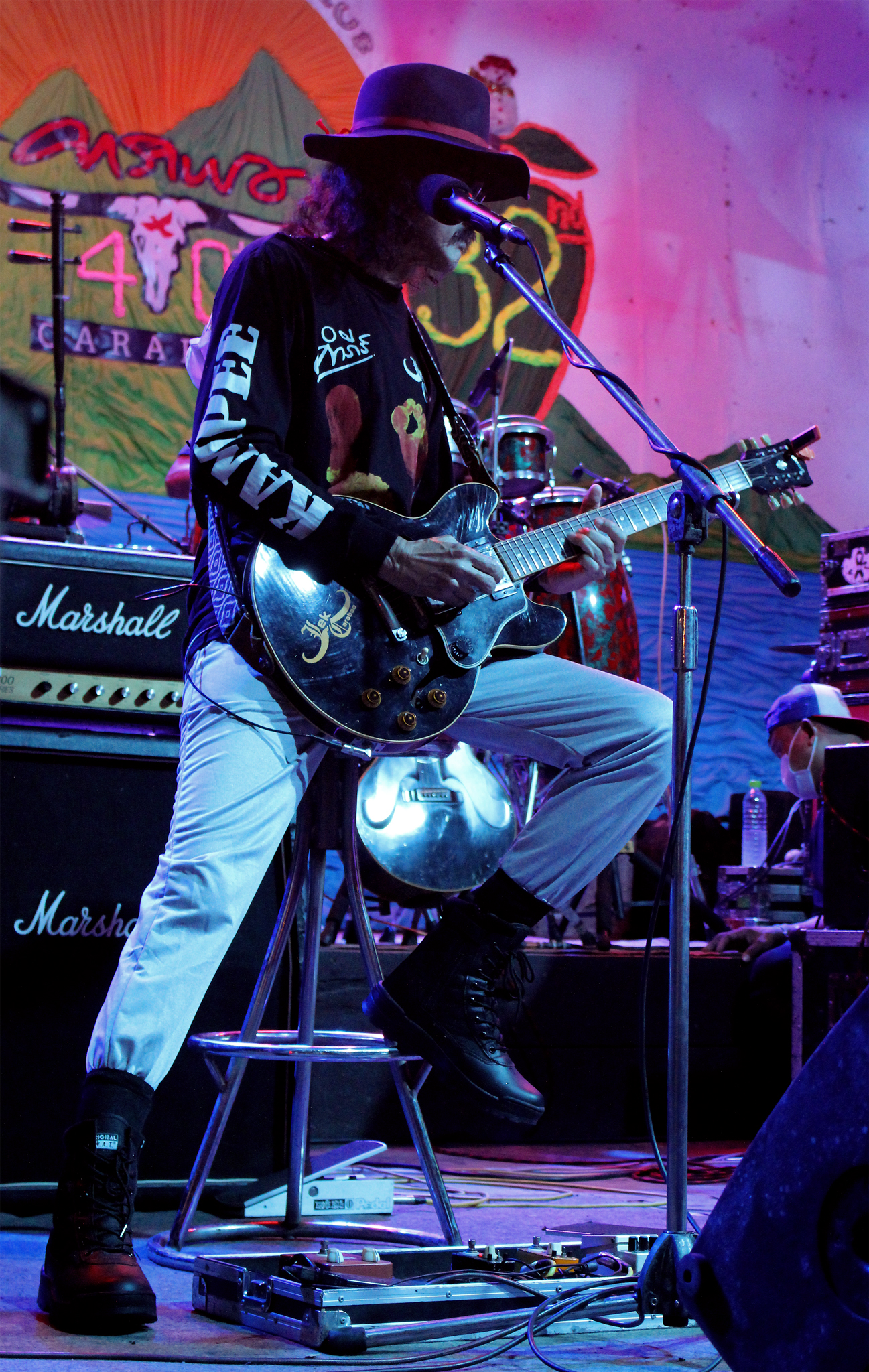
- Chanapai performing at the Green Mango Club, Ko Samui, during Carabao's 40th anniversary tour in 2022
- Born: Preecha Chanapai; April 18, 1955 (age 71); Bangkok, Thailand
- Other names: Lek; Lek Carabao
- Occupations: Singer-songwriter; musician; audio engineer
- Years active: 1970s–present
- Awards: Season Awards (1989) (Best Solo Male Artist, Best Album)
- Musical career
- Genres: Folk; rock; Phleng phuea chiwit; rhythm and blues
- Instruments: Vocals; guitar; banjo; saw u; guzheng
- Label: Warner Music Thailand
- Website: Official website

Preecha Chanapai (Thai: ปรีชา ชนะภัย; born April 18, 1955), also known by the stage name Lek Carabao (Thai: เล็ก คาราบาว), is a Thai musician and singer. He is a member of Carabao, a Thai rock band, and a proponent of phleng phuea chiwit, a Thai protest song genre.

== Biography and career ==
Chanapai taught himself to play the guitar from the age of 14 and never took formal lessons. The guitar became his main instrument, though he also played traditional instruments such as the saw u and the guzheng.

Chanapai studied at the Uthenthawai School of Mechanics (now Rajamangala University of Technology Tawan-ok, Uthenthawai Campus), where he met Yuenyong Opakul (Aed Carabao), who was ahead of him in school.

While still a student, he began playing guitar in pubs and bars. Some of these did not allow minors, so he wore a wig to get in. He was paid 3,000 baht a month.

After graduating, he became a professional musician and made his name as the guitarist of The President, a disco band popular in the 1970s. Other musicians knew him for his precise guitar playing.

At Aed Carabao's urging, Chanapai joined Carabao as guitarist and singer for its second album, Pae Khaai Khuat (แป๊ะขายขวด; lit. 'The Old Bottle Collector'), released in 1982. He has been a member ever since.

In 2003, Chanapai appeared in the film Fan Chan (แฟนฉัน; lit. 'My Girl'), playing the female lead's father, a barber. It was the highest-grossing Thai film of the year.

Chanapai is married and has two sons, nicknamed Tod and Fab. He keeps a guitar pick permanently glued to the nail of his right finger. He has also produced a Carabao-branded acoustic guitar. More recently, he has become a pescetarian. He collects the shampoo and soap bottles from hotels he stays at while touring.

The Thai singer Pongsit Kamphee has named Chanapai as his favorite musician and an inspiration.

=== Experience during the October 14 Uprising ===
Unlike his friend Yuenyong Opakul, Chanapai was not deeply involved in politics, but he witnessed the October 14, 1973, uprising.

At the time, Chanapai was a student at Uthenthawai School of Mechanics and took part only as an onlooker. He recalled that a female classmate threw a rock at the soldiers, after which the situation grew worse. The clashes turned violent and were shown live on television. His father, who was already ill at home, saw the news and, worried about his son, collapsed.

When he got home, he and his brother-in-law tried to take his father to Siriraj Hospital, but no taxi would stop for them. In the end, he stood in the road and forced a taxi to stop.

Soldiers came to the hospital looking for protesters, most of them university students. A doctor gave Chanapai a lab coat so that he would not be arrested.

His father died shortly after being admitted. Chanapai spent that night at the hospital, sleeping among the medical students.

The next day, he walked home barefoot past the damaged streets around Ratchadamnoen Avenue and the Democracy Monument.

He has said the experience made him grow up and later led him to phleng phuea chiwit.

These events were portrayed in the 2013 film Young Bao: The Movie. Chanapai was played by Arak "Pe Slur" Amornsupasiri.
