= Rajamangala University of Technology Tawan-ok, Uthenthawai Campus =

Rajamangala University of Technology Tawan-ok, Uthenthawai Campus is a campus of Rajamangala University of Technology Tawan-ok (RMUTTO) located on Phaya Thai Road in Pathum Wan district, Bangkok, Thailand. It is home to the Faculty of Engineering and Architecture, which provides undergraduate and postgraduate education in engineering, architecture, design, logistics and related fields.

The campus traces its origins to the Uthenthawai School of Construction (โรงเรียนช่างก่อสร้างอุเทนถวาย), which was established in the 1930s and separated from Poh-Chang Academy of Arts as an independent school on 1 February 1934. It later became part of the Institute of Technology and Vocational Education and the Rajamangala Institute of Technology, before becoming part of Rajamangala University of Technology Tawan-ok following the establishment of the university in 2005.

The former administration building of the Uthenthawai School of Construction is a two-storey modernist building with Art Deco elements. The building survived the bombing of Bangkok during World War II and received an architectural conservation award in 2017. Students and staff of the campus have also received awards in architectural design and academic competitions, including awards at the International Conference and Workshop on Sustainable Architecture, Urban Design and Development (ICWSAUD) in 2024.

The campus occupies approximately 20 rai (3.3 hectares) of land owned by Chulalongkorn University. A long-running dispute over the return of the site resulted in a final ruling by Thailand's Supreme Administrative Court in 2022 requiring RMUTTO to vacate and return the property.

== Notable Alumni ==
- Aed Carabao
- Preecha Chanapai
- Chupong Theethuan
