= Waniphok =

วณิพก (Waniphok)

Studio album by Carabao
- Released: 1983
- Recorded: 1982
- Genre: Thai rock Phleng phuea chiwit
- Length: n/a
- Label: Azona (1983); Warner Music Thailand (2011)
- Producer: Carabao

Carabao chronology
Pae Khaai Khuat (1981)	วณิพก (Waniphok) (1983)	Th. Thahaan Ot Thon (1983)

Waniphok (วณิพก) was the third album by Thai rock band Carabao. It was released in 1983.

== Track listing ==
Track	Thai	Transcription
01	วณิพก	Waniphok
02	ถึกควายทุย (3)	Thyk Khwaaj Tui (3)
03	หรอย	Rooi
04	ไม้ไผ่	Maai Phai
05	ดอกจาน	Dook Caan
06	บวชหน้าไฟ	Buat Naa Fai
07	Summer Hill	Summer Hill
08	หัวลำโพง	Hualamphong
09	จับกัง	Cap Kang
10	ล้อเกวียน	Loo Kwian
