= Made in Thailand =

Studio album by Carabao
- Released: December 1984
- Recorded: 1984
- Genre: Phleng phuea chiwit
- Length: n/a
- Label: GMM Grammy / AMIGO (1984); Warner Music Thailand (2005 and 2011, remastered)
- Producer: Carabao

Carabao chronology
Th. Thahaan Ot Thon (1983)	Made in Thailand (1984)	Ameerikooi (1985)

Made in Thailand (Thai: เมดอินไทยแลนด์) is the fifth studio album by Thai rock band Carabao. Released in December 1984, it is their most popular album, having sold over five million copies. The album's title track, "Made in Thailand", was also featured in the 1985 Sompote Sands film Magic Lizard.

"Bua Looi", the fifth part in the Thyk Kwai Tui series, is considered one of Carabao's signature songs. It gained international attention when it was played during the women's volleyball quarter-finals match between South Korea and Turkey at the 2020 Summer Olympics.

In August 2015, Thairath ranked Made in Thailand sixth on its list of the "15 Thai music albums you should listen to before you die". In 2024, the song "Bua Looi" was also featured in the teaser trailer and the first episode of the third season of American television series The White Lotus.

== Track listing ==
Track	Thai	Transcription
01	เมดอินไทยแลนด์	Made In Thailand
02	มหาลัย	Mahaalai
03	ลูกหิน	Luuk Hin
04	ลูกแก้ว	Luuk Kaew
05	หำเทียม	Ham Thiam
06	สองเฒ่าผู้ยิ่งใหญ่	Soong Thaw Phuu Jing Jai
07	ราชาเงินผ่อน	Raachaangoen Phoon
08	นางงามตู้กระจก	Naang Ngaam Tuu Kracok
09	เรฟูจี	Refugee
10	บัวลอย (ถึกควายทุย ๕)	Bua Looi (Thyk Kwai tui 5)
