= Caravan (Thai band) =

Thai folk-rock band

- Origin: Thailand
- Genres: Folk, phleng phuea chiwit
- Years active: 1975–present
- Members: Surachai Jantimathawn; Thongkran Thana
- Past members: Wirasak Sunthawnnsi; Mongkhon Uthok

Caravan (Thai: คาราวาน, RTGS: Kharawan), is a Thai folk-rock band that formed out of the 1973 democracy movement. It launched the phleng phuea chiwit (เพลงเพื่อชีวิต, lit. "songs for life") genre that has since been popularized by Carabao.

== Personnel ==
=== Current members ===
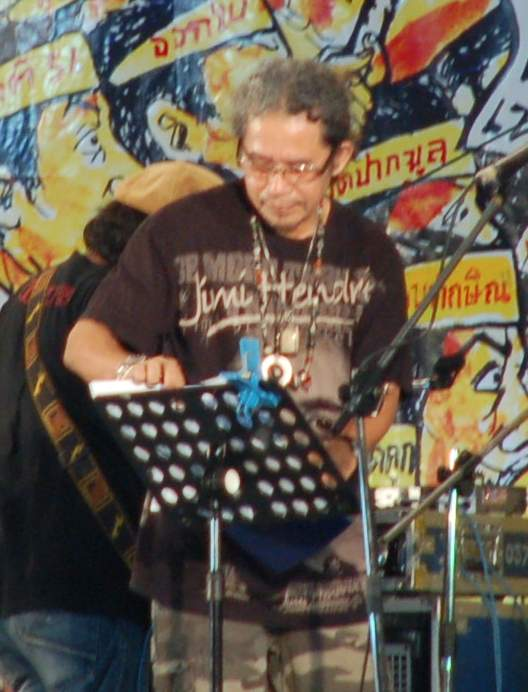
Surachai "Nga" Jantimathawn

- Surachai "Nga Caravan" Jantimathawn - vocals, acoustic guitar (1975–present)
- Thongkran Thana - lead guitar, slide guitar, violin, vocals (1975–present)

=== Former members ===
- Wirasak Sunthawnnsi - guitar, vocals (1975–2021; died 17 December 2021)
- Mongkhon Uthok - vocals, phin (a kind of Thai lute), wut (a panpipe-like Thai instrument), harmonica (1975–2018; died September 2018)

== Music ==
Surachai Jantimatawn was the band's primary vocalist and songwriter. He also played guitar. Wirasak Suntornsii played guitar and also did occasional bass and lead vocals. Mongkhon Uthok sang lead and played phin (a Thai stringed instrument), harmonica, wut (a panpipe-like Thai instrument) and saw (the Thai version of the Chinese erhu). Thongkran Thana played violin, slide guitar, as well as lead guitar in the band's later electric incarnations. They were often joined by Phongthep Kradonchamnan, later a well-known phleng phuea chiwit artist in his own right, on Thai percussion, flute, and vocals.

Caravan was known for combining Thai and Western folk music in arrangements dominated by acoustic guitars, but spiced up with Uthok's use of traditional Thai instruments, as well as frequent use of Thai-style percussion. Most of their Thai-influenced songs took the form of folk ballads, but they also made frequent use of the faster and more percussive "mor lam" rhythms. In their early days, they often took melodies directly from American and British folk songs like "Song to Woody", "Yellow Bird", "John Barleycorn Must Die" and "A Hard Rain's a-Gonna Fall" and adapted them with political lyrics in Thai. Their later music sometimes had a noticeable country music influence in songs like "Num Phanejawn" and "Fon Thewa," although as a whole, the influence of Western folk diminished as their career went on. When the band went electric, it expanded its range of sound to include influences of rock, reggae, folk music from other Asian countries, and a wider range of Thai musical styles.

== Band history ==
The founders of Caravan, Surachai Jantimathawn ("Nga Caravan") and Wirasak Sunthawnsi, were student activists at Ramkhamhaeng University at a time when the student movement was instrumental in toppling the dictatorial regime of Thanom Kittikachorn. They sympathized with the working class farmers in Northeast Thailand. They were soon joined by Mongkhon Uthok and Thongkran Thana.

One of the band's most popular songs is "Khon Kap Khwai" ("Man and Buffalo"), which rhapsodizes the relationship of rice farmers and their water buffalo, but with the lyrics that include "Come, let's go now! Come, let's go! Carry our plows and guns to the fields!", it was also a political statement by lyricists Somkit Singson and Visa Kantap, who were both critical of the Thanom regime. Other songs condemned the presence of the US military.

Early albums included Khon Kap Khwai (1975) and Amerikan Antarai (1976) and Ruam Botpleng Sipsee Tulaa Siphok Vol. 2 (A Collection Of Songs For 14 October 1973, Vol. 2, 1976).

After the 6 October 1976 Massacre, student activists, including members of Caravan, fled to the countryside and neighboring Laos, taking shelter with the Communist Party of Thailand. When amnesty was declared in 1979, the band's members gradually returned from exile, and by 1982 Caravan had released the album Deuan Phen (Full Moon). Other albums followed, including Khon Ti Lek (Blacksmith, 1983) and Live at the 50th Anniversary of Thammasat University (1984).

In the mid-1980s, the band went electric, adding a bassist and drummer for studio and live performances. The electric period, starting with the album 1985 included one of the band's best-known songs "Dawk Mai Hai Khun" ("Flowers For You") which was a Thai-language adaptation of Okinawan musician Shoukichi Kina's international hit "Subete no Hito no Kokoro ni Hana o." Three more electric albums followed, including Khon Klai Baan, US-Japan and Anon. A concert album, Live in Japan at Taku Taku (1988) showed that the band's influence was growing outside Thailand.

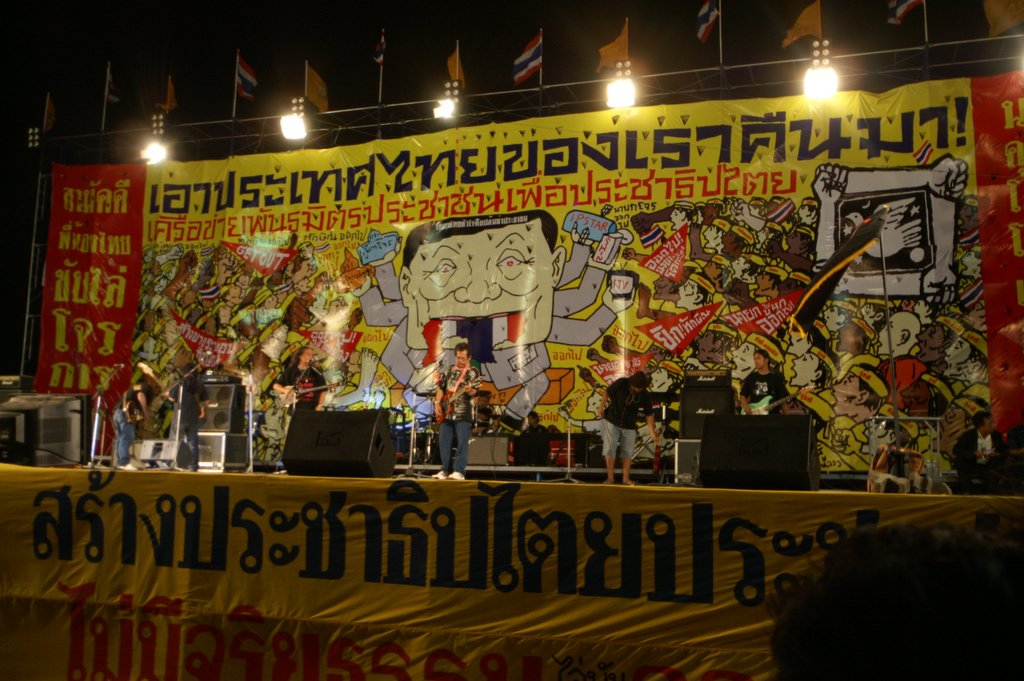
Caravan playing during "Yellow Shirts" anti-Thaksin protests 2006

Sunthawnsi left the band after the Khon Klai Ban album and was not replaced. At the end of the 1980s, the band decided to break up and staged a series of acoustic farewell concerts, joined again by Sunthawnsi, as well as frequent collaborator Phongthep Kradonchamnan and percussionist Ut Yannawa, who had played drums and percussion on the band's electric albums.

Since then, the band has reunited a number of times to play live concerts, although they have recorded little new music since the 1990s, with only new albums (Klap Ma Thoet and Tulakhom) being made in the past two decades.

The band supported the People's Alliance for Democracy (PAD or the "Yellow Shirts") and frequently played during their protests against then prime minister Thaksin Shinawatra in 2006 and the anti-government protests 2008. Members of the band also appeared in support of the anti-Pheu Thai government People's Democratic Reform Committee (PDRC or the "Whistleblowers) in the protests between November 2013 and May 2014.

== Discography ==
=== Studio albums ===
- Songs for Life (1975, Paredon Records, Smithsonian Folkways)
- Man and Buffalo [Khon Kub Kwai]
- Dangerous American [American Antarai]
- Shattered Land [Barnna Satern]
- Blacksmith [Khon Tee Lhek]
- 1985 8 May
- Khon Klai Barn
- US-Japan
- Ar-Non
- October [Tula-khom]

=== Live albums ===
- Concert for UNICEF, 1983
- Live at the 50th Anniversary of Thammasat University, 1984
- Live on Air (12th Anniversary Caravan Kuen Rung), 1986
- Live at Taku Taku, Japan, 1988
- Live at Minamata, Japan, 1989
- Farewell Concert 15 Years, 1989
- Vancouver Folk Music Festival. 1991
- Live on Air at CITR Radio Station, 1991
- Live at Washington University, 1991
- Live in Japan, 2004

=== Other appearances ===
- Marn Klong Muang [Bootleg]
- Amerasia with Terry Allen
- Klub Ma Terd with Phongthep Kradonchamnan
