= Aed Carabao =

Thai musician and entrepreneur (born 1954)

Yuenyong Opakul ChBh
- ยืนยง โอภากุล
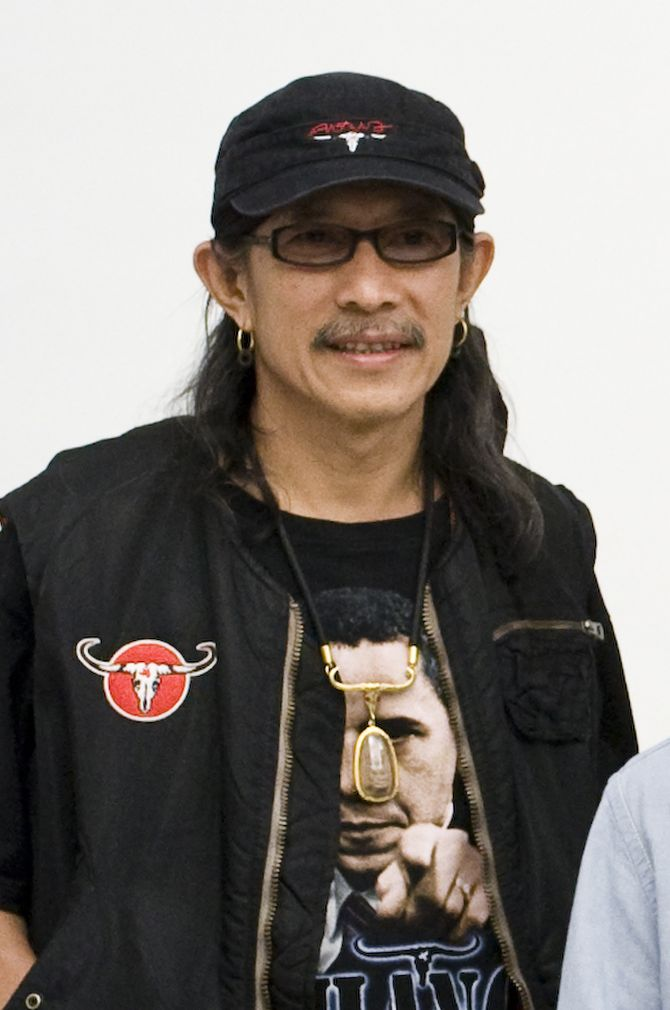
- Aed in 2009
- Born: Yuenyong Opakul; 9 November 1954 (age 72); Suphan Buri, Thailand
- Other name: Aed Carabao
- Occupations: Singer; songwriter; musician; entrepreneur; actor; author; activist
- Years active: 1979 – present
- Spouse: Linjong Opakul
- Children: 3
- Relatives: Artiwara Kongmalai (nephew); Bongkot Kongmalai (niece)
- Musical career
- Genres: Rock; phleng phuea chiwit; country; R&B; blues; pop
- Instruments: Vocals; guitar; mouth organ
- Label: Warner Music Thailand
- Member of: Carabao
- Website: Official website

Yuenyong Opakul (Note: Thai: ยืนยง โอภากุล, RTGS: Yuen-yong O-phakun) (born 9 November 1954), known professionally as Aed Carabao (Note: Thai: แอ๊ด คาราบาว, RTGS: Aet Kharabao), is a Thai musician, activist, and entrepreneur. He is best known as the lead vocalist, guitarist, primary songwriter, and a founding member of the Thai rock band Carabao.

In October 2022, the governor of Suphan Buri province filed a defamation complaint with the Royal Thai Police after Yuenyong publicly criticised him for not inviting the musician to perform at an annual provincial fair in his hometown. Yuenyong later issued an apology.

== History ==
=== Early life ===
He was born in a Thai Teochew Chinese middle-class family in Tambon Tha Phi Liang, Mueang Suphan Buri, Suphan Buri Province in central Thailand. He is the third generation of overseas Chinese immigrants living in Thailand. Yuenyong is the youngest son of the family. He has a twin brother who is fellow singer and musician, Yingyong Opakul (Eed). His grandfather came from a small village in the Fengshun, Meizhou north of Han River, Guangdong. His father's named Manus Opakul, who was highly regarded in the local area as a folk philosopher. Manus was a merchant, look thung (Thai country music) band manager, writer, local historian and was the pioneer of first Suphan Buri local newspaper.

As a youngster, Yuenyong was exposed to the music of central Thailand: call and response songs, Thai folk music, Thai dancing, and look thung which his father was a band manager. When Yeunyong was a teenager he was influenced by Western music, and learned to play Western musical instruments. These were influences he drew on as a musician.

He wrote in his autobiography that as a child he had dive in the Tha Chin River that flows through behind his house. He caught a rare species Siamese tigerfish and sold it to an aquarium shop.

Yuenyong began primary education at Wat Suwan School, then left for further studies in Bangkok. He continued on in his studies at Uthenthawai Vocational School (now's Rajamangala University of Technology Tawan-ok, Uthenthawai Campus), where he majored in architecture. Then he continued in architecture for one year at the Mapúa Institute of Technology in the Philippines.

In the Philippines, Yuengyong Opakul met Kirati Promsaka Na Sakon Nakhon, or Keo, another Thai student. They listened to the music of Led Zeppelin, John Denver, the Eagles, and Peter Frampton from records that a third friend, Sanit Limsila, or Kai, had accumulated. All three agreed to set up a band with the name "Carabao" to perform folk music at the institute.

When Yuenyoung Opakul graduated and returned to Thailand, he found work as an architect. Later, when Kai and Keo returned from the Philippines, all three met to play music together again in the Windsor Hotel restaurant in central Bangkok. They played at the Hotel Mandarin Samyan on weekends. All three friends were fired from their jobs for skipping work without notice.

Jobless, Kai left the group to work in south Thailand. Aed and Keo stayed and continued playing music together with the band Hope. In 1980, Yuenyong was working as an architect in an office managing a National Housing Authority project. Keo was working as an engineer for a Filipino company opening a branch in Thailand. Together, they played music in the evenings at a bar in the Ambassador Hotel Sukhumvit.

=== Achieving stardom ===
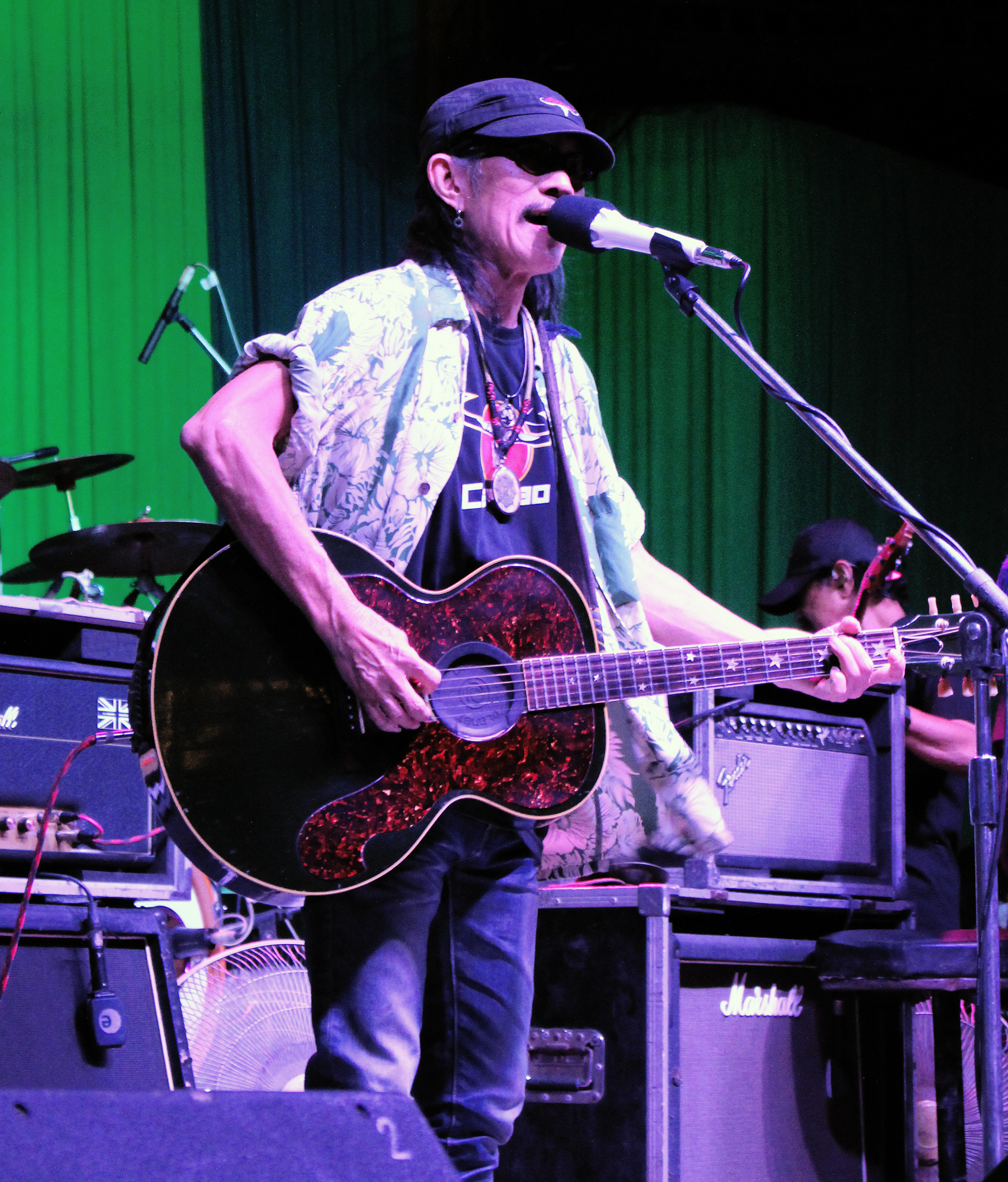
Aed Carabao on stage 2022, Carabao's 40-years anniversary tour in The Green Mango Club, Ko Samui.

Aed produced the first album of the group Hammer in 1979. With this album, Hammer became known. In 1980, Aed composed the song "Teuk Kwaai Tui" ('Wild Buffalo') for Hammer to record for their album Bpak Dtai Baan Rao ('Our Southern Home'). That album vaulted Hammer to fame. Later, Aed worked with Hammer to come out with an album named Khanchanmueang with a folk-look thung musical style. He participated in composing songs for a movie starring the singer Phonom Napon in 1981.

Aed got together with Keo and produced their first album under the name "Carabao" in 1981. The album, Kee Mao ('The Drunkard'), achieved little notice. So the band toured, playing in cinemas across the country to small audiences.

Carabao became successful with their fifth album, Made in Thailand (1984), selling five million copies, and making "Aed Carabao" a household name in Thailand. It wasn't until he made it big that he quit his day job as an architect, a job he has said he enjoyed very much. He has since toured in Europe, Japan, and the US.

Aed has written and performed no fewer than 900 songs, making him one of the most prolific singer–songwriters in the world.

== Social role ==
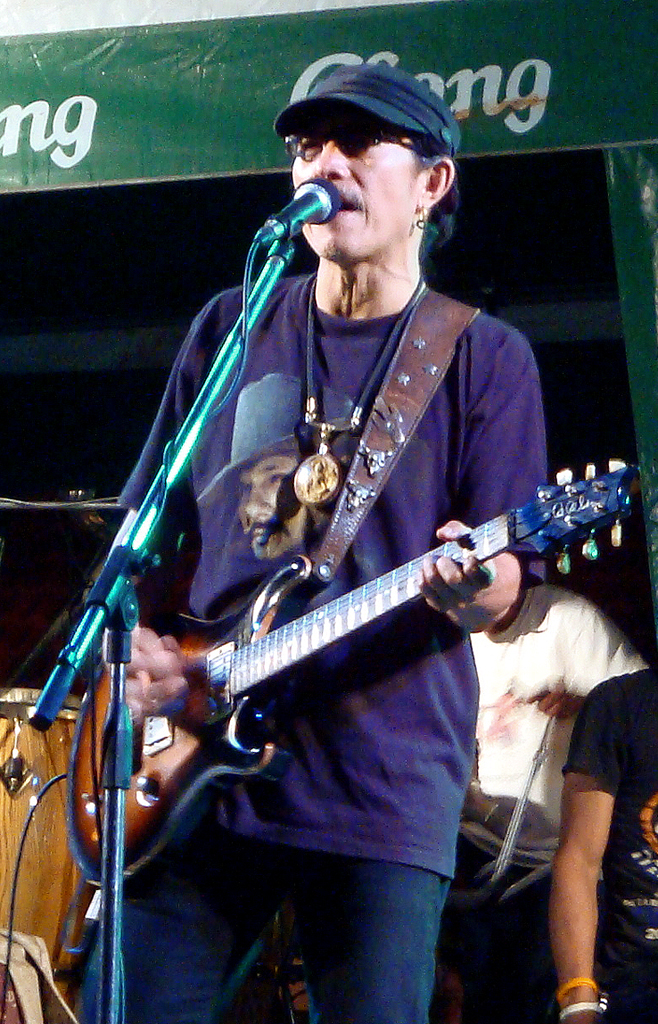
Aed Carabao on stage in 2009, concert at 14 May 2009 in Bo Phut, Koh Samui.

Aed has not limited himself to the role of song artist only, but also hosts television programs and composes music for movies. He has acted in several movies and has composed musical public service announcements on issues or to advertise a project.

Aed is a keen observer of the Thai political and social scene. He has composed songs on salient events affecting the country:

- "Ma Nok" ('Ma Nok') inspired by the events of 9 Sep revolt
- "No Plom Plam" ('No problem') criticizing the government at that time with Gen Chatichai Choonhavan as prime minister
- "Suepthot Chetana" ('Continuing the Spirit'), composed in tribute to Seub Nakhasathien and reflecting the ideals of wildlife and natural resource conservation. The song was included on Aed Carabao's fourth solo album, No Plom Plam, released in 1990.
- "Khri Kha Pra Cha Chon" ('Who Killed People') and "Ratchadamnoen" ('Ratchadamnoen') with "Talay Jai" ('Ocean Heart') inspired by the events of Black May 1992
- "Boon Ma" ('Boon Ma') from drafting the 1997 constitution and criticized then prime minister Banharn Silpa-archa as a fellow Suphan Buri people
- "Khwan Thai Jai Neung Deaw" ('Thai Axe, All for One') about the South Thailand insurgency
- "Tsunami" inspired by the 2004 Indian Ocean earthquake and tsunami
- "When Whak" ('Punctuate') arising from the 2005–06 Thai political crisis
- "Jed Tula Lod Thong Kreung Sao" ('7 Oct, Half-Mast') stemming from the 2008–2010 Thai political crisis
- "Thep Pa Chao Dan Khun Thot" ('God of Dan Khun Thot') from the death of Luang Por Koon Paritsuttho.
- "Winyan Phu Phithak" ('Spirit of the Protector'), composed in 2021 to encourage Chaiwat Limlikit-aksorn, former chief of Kaeng Krachan National Park, after he was dismissed from the civil service.

In 2013, Aed Carabao was named a National Artist of Thailand in the field of performing arts (Thai contemporary music) in recognition of his contributions as a singer, songwriter, and leader of the band Carabao.

Aed Carabao has participated in youth music education through the Carabao Foundation's Dontri Sang Khunkha Chiwit (Music Creates Life Values) project, where he has served as a workshop instructor and shared his experience in songwriting and music performance with participating students.

Since 2014, the project has expanded into the television program Bao Young Blood, produced by Workpoint Entertainment in collaboration with the Carabao Foundation and Carabao Group. The program provides young people aged under 24 with an opportunity to reinterpret and perform songs by Carabao in their own style. Aed Carabao has served as a workshop instructor and mentor for participants throughout the program.

Aed Carabao also serves as chairman of the Carabao Foundation, which promotes youth development through music education projects and provides assistance to senior artists and entertainment industry personnel facing financial hardship.

In addition to promoting music education, Aed Carabao has participated in the Carabao Foundation's Tambon Khong Nu (My Subdistrict) essay competition. The project invited primary school students from across Thailand to write essays addressed to "Uncle Aed Carabao" on the theme "A Good Natural Environment Creates Life Values in My Community". The competition aimed to foster environmental awareness, encourage appreciation of local communities, and promote learning about participants' hometowns. Winning essays were adapted into short documentary films for the television program Samruat Thammachat On the World, broadcast on the Royal Thai Army Radio and Television Channel 5.

During the COVID-19 pandemic in Thailand, Aed Carabao, together with Carabao Group, donated 50 million baht to the Chaipattana Foundation's COVID-19 Relief Fund to support the procurement of medical equipment and assistance for healthcare personnel and patients affected by the pandemic.

== Carabao Dang ==
Carabao Dang (CBD), a business for manufacturing, marketing and selling energy drinks, was incorporated in 2001. The company was a joint investment by Sathien Setthasit, Nutchamai Thanombooncharoen, and Aed Carabao. As of 2018 Aed serves as "brand ambassador" for Carabao Dang.

== Honours ==
In 2013, Aed received an honorary doctorate in Thai popular music from Ramkhamhaeng University. He was also appointed a National Artist in the performing arts branch (international and Thai music) in the same year. In 2014, he has also received a royal order in the Honours System of Thailand.

- – Companion (Fourth Class) of the Most Admirable Order of the Direkgunabhorn (2014)
