= Thai rock =

Rock music from Thailand

- Other names: Phleng rock (เพลงร็อก), T-rock (ที-ร็อก)
- Stylistic origins: Rock; rock and roll
- Cultural origins: 1960s, Thailand
- Derivative forms: Phleng phuea chiwit

Thai rock (Thai: ไทยร็อก) is rock music from Thailand that was heavily influenced by American and British rock bands. It originally emerged in the 1960s, when Thai musicians played cover songs for American soldiers stationed there during the Vietnam War. The genre later flourished in the 1980s with bands like Asanee–Wasan, Carabao, and Micro. Today, Thai rock has become as diverse as the broader rock genre itself. Bands adopting this style are further classified under more specific subgenres or combinations, including alternative rock, grunge, folk rock, new wave, pop rock, punk rock, heavy metal, and more recently, indie, post-rock, and shoegaze. Because these subgenres all fall under the broad umbrella of rock, Thai rock can be more specifically defined as rock music infused with Thai cultural sensibilities.

== History ==
=== 1960s: Western rock music adaptation ===
The earliest Thai pop rock music emerged from western music influenced form both the United States and United Kingdom. The earliest Thai rock combo groups played a combination of instrumental music and surf music influenced by The Ventures and The Shadows which was known locally as Wong shadow.

The international popularity in the 1960s with bands such as The Beatles, The Beach Boys, The Rolling Stones, The Doors, and musician Jimi Hendrix influenced the creation of some of the earliest western style groups. The most popular Thai beat, garage rock, and psychedelic rock groups include The Impossibles, The Cat, and The Dynamics in the mid to late 1960s.

=== 1970s to early 1990s ===
==== Hard rock and heavy metal ====
The Thai blues rock and hard rock genre began in the late 1960s and early 1970s by Lam "Guitar King" Morrison and Kitii "Guitar Gun" Kanchanasathit who performed for American GI's during the Vietnam War.

Early rock bands in the genre include V.I.P. led by Lam Morrison, Siamese and Kaleidoscope led by Kitti Kanchanasathit, The Fox led by Chor On Na Bangchang, Epitaph and Marmalade led by Olarn Promjai, Heavy Mountain led by Daeng Veyjan, Mundee led by Ekamun Potipunthong, and Suang Santi who helped to make Thai rock music mainstream.

In the 1980s, a plethora of Thai heavy metal and hard rock bands emerged, including The Olarn Project, Neua Gub Nang, and Rockestra.

The Rock Pub opened in Bangkok in 1987. For close to forty years The Rock Pub has provided a home for the wide variety of Thai rock and roll, rock, pop rock, hard rock, heavy metal, and related subgenres played by Thai rock musicians and groups.

In the early 1990s, heavy metal and hard rock became popular in Thailand. Prominent bands receiving mainstream recognition included Stone Metal Fire, Uranium, Big Gun, and Hi-Rock.

==== Pop rock ====
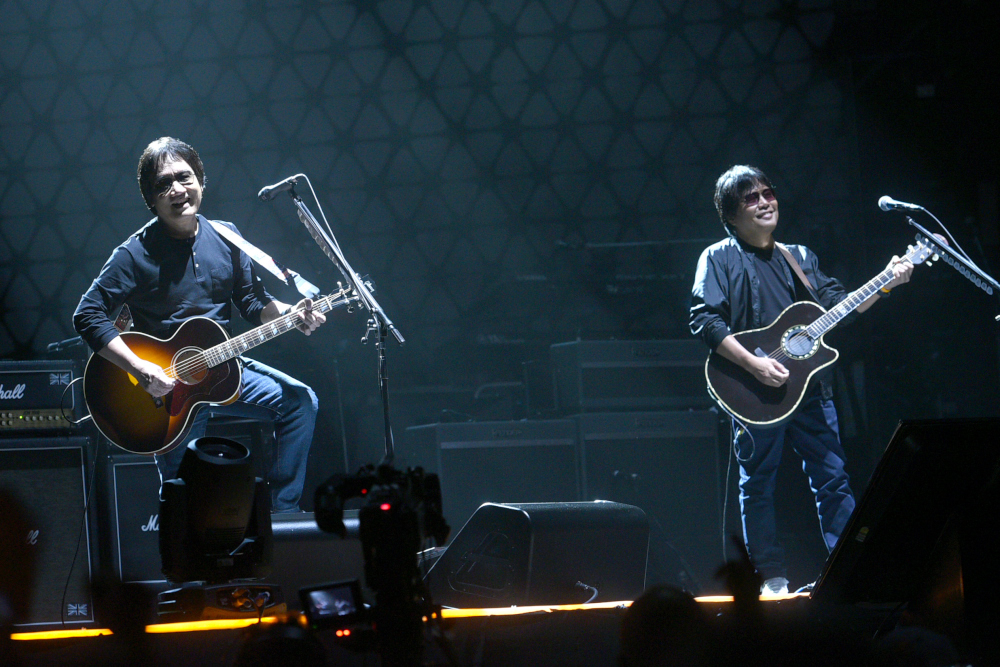
Asanee-Wasan in 2016

Rock music, including genres like pop-rock, soft rock, and new wave, saw significant growth in Thailand during the 1980s. The Innocent, a pop rock band, was one of Thailand's early successful pop rock groups in the 1980s. Prominent acts included Thai bands Asanee-Wasan and Micro. Among their successful albums were Micro's Rock Lek Lek, Meun Fahrenheit, and Tem Tang, and Asanee-Wasan's Kra-Dee Dai Narm, Bah Horb Fang, and Fuk Tong.

The pop-rock band Nuvo became successful with their debut album Pen Yang Ngi Tang tae Koet Loei (เป็นอย่างงี้ตั้งแต่เกิดเลย) in 1988, which sold over a million copies. Hydra (composed of Nakarin Kingsak and Thana Lavasut) released their album Asajeree (อัศเจรีย์) in 1992 under the label Nititad Promotion, and they also won the 1992 Season Award for Best New Band for that album.

Itti Balangura debuted in 1988 with the song Keb Tawan (เก็บตะวัน), which became popular.

==== Folk rock ====
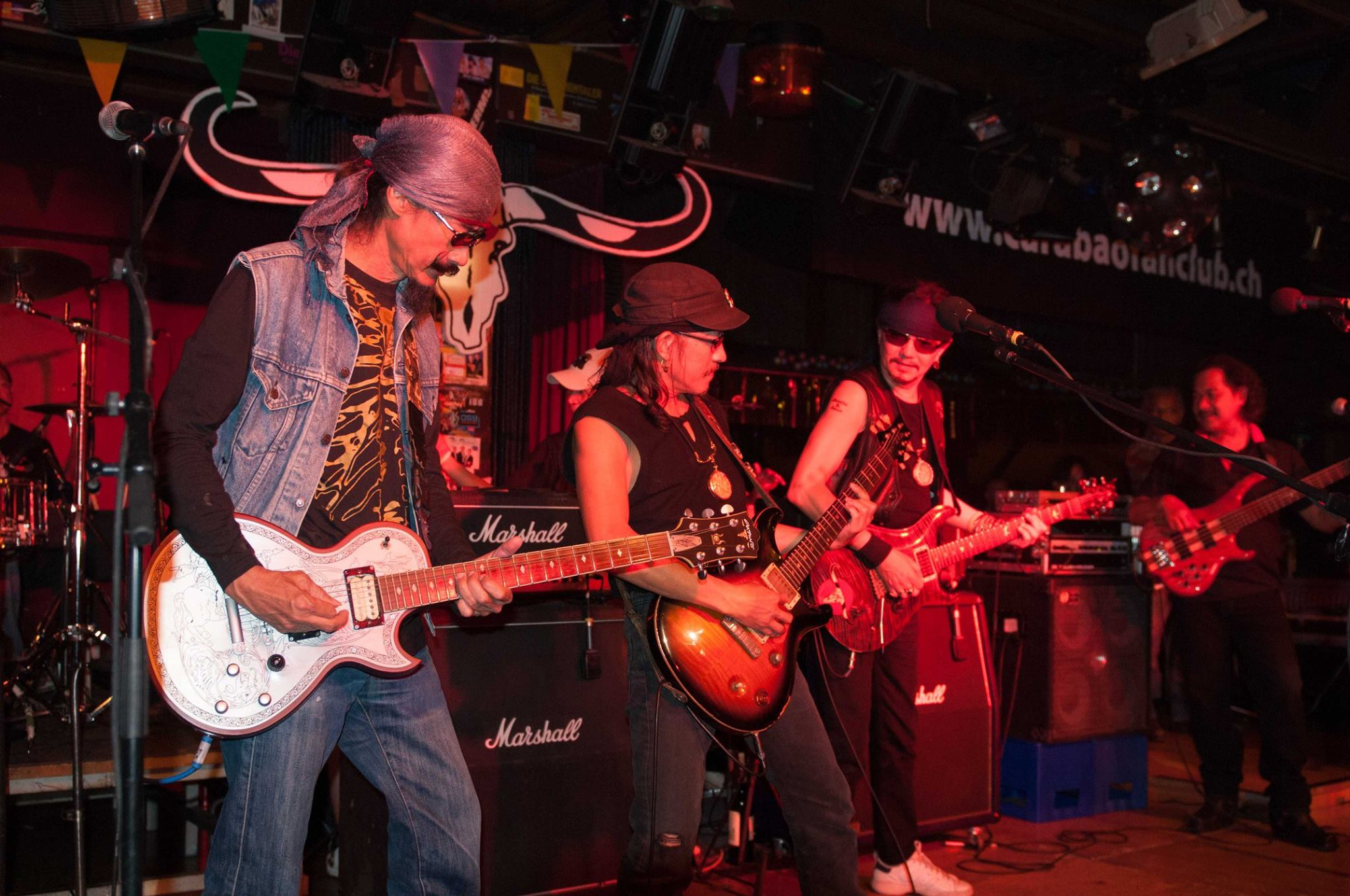
Carabao in 2008

Caravan is credited as the first folk-rock band to sing in the Thai language in the 1970s. They pioneered the phleng phuea chiwit genre. Carabao became more widely known with their third album, Waniphok, released in 1983 under the Azona label, which featured the title track of the same name. Their fifth album, Made in Thailand (1984), sold over five million copies.

In the 1990s, the folk-rock band Inca, along with artists such as Pongsit Kampee, and Thanapol Intharit, also gained mainstream recognition.

=== The mid-to-late 1990s ===
==== Thrash and death metal ====
The late 1980s and early 1990s marked the beginning of what became known as the era of death metal and thrash metal. Donpheebin pioneered the scene in the early 1990s, followed by Dezember, who began performing in the mid-1990s. Dezember's early albums, including the 1994 EP Laththi Satan and the 1995 full-length Winatsakam, garnered interest among indie music listeners.

==== Alternative and grunge ====
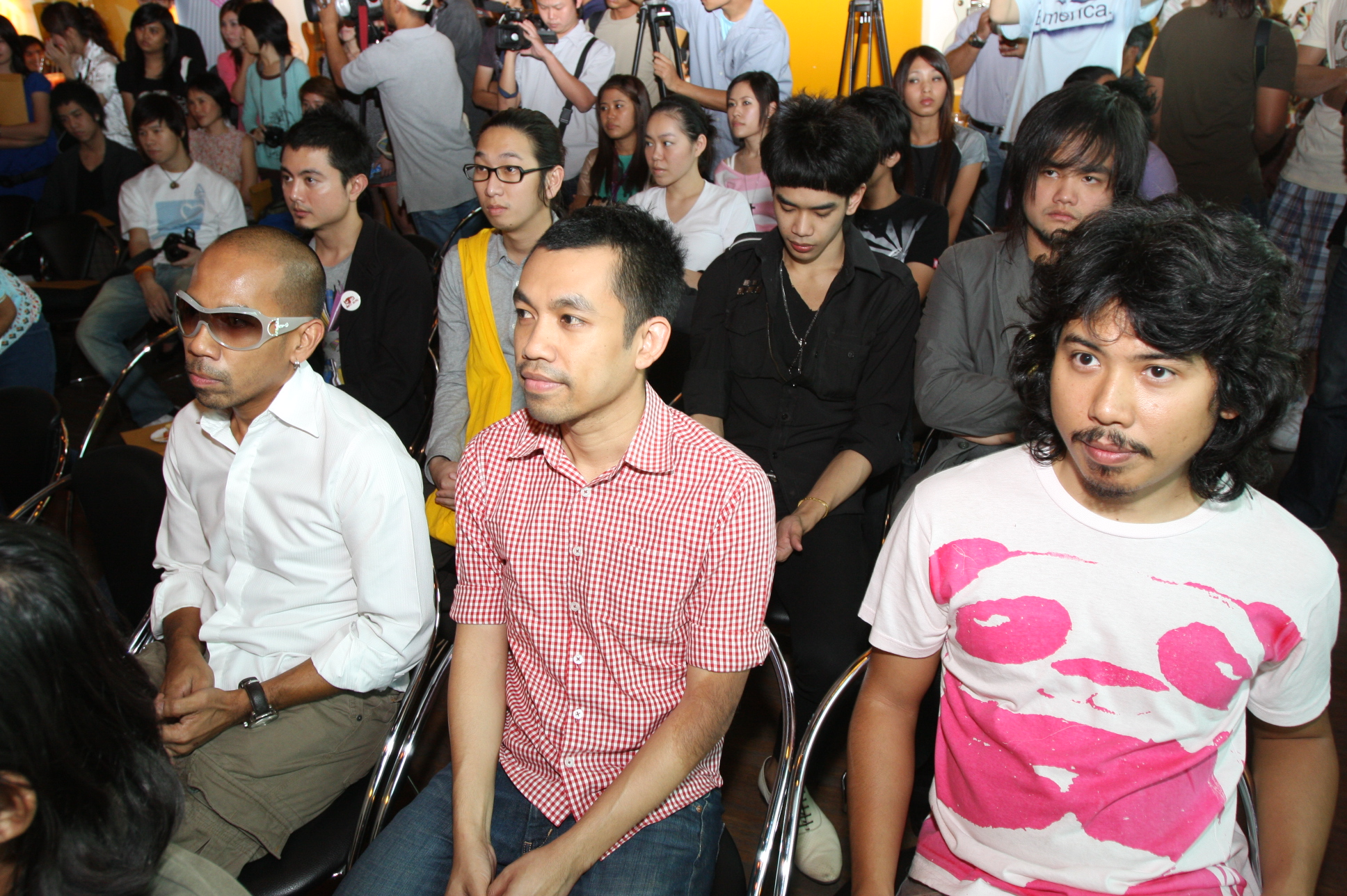
Modern Dog in 2007

The early to mid-1990s saw a shift in the Thai rock scene as alternative music rose in popularity, pushing aside heavy metal and hard rock. The pioneering Thai alternative rock group Modern Dog released their debut album, Soem Sukkhaphap, and went on to achieve significant success. Another pioneering group, Crub, released their debut album, View, in 1994. Crub's songs were influenced by the shoegaze and Madchester/baggy scene, while Modern Dog's music was influenced by grunge, funk and soul. Both groups' songs were introduced on the radio by Wanasa Wirachartplee. She was instrumental in spreading the influence of Thai alternative and indie rock across the nation. A key figure in the alternative scene, she also brought many foreign bands to perform in Bangkok, such as Suede and the Manic Street Preachers in 1994. Modern Dog's success fundamentally changed the Thai rock scene by sparking a wider interest in indie music and illustrating the movement's mainstream reach.

Many Thai alternative rock bands drew inspiration from American grunge (e.g., Nirvana), and British indie rock/Britpop (e.g., Radiohead, Oasis, and Blur). This led to the emergence of numerous alt-rock bands, including Proud, Y Not 7, Sepia, Smile Buffalo, Loso, Blackhead, Nursery Sound, Fly, Students Ugly, and Pause, as well as artists like Nakarin Kingsak, Ornaree, and AUDY. Thai alternative rock reached its peak popularity between 1995 and 1996. Although most Thai alternative and indie bands had disbanded or faded into obscurity by the late 1990s, their influence permeated later pop-rock bands of that era, such as Shogun Jump, Labanoon, Paradox, as well as bands influenced by nu-metal and alternative metal, such as Aladin, Silly Fools, and Big Ass.

Loso's Entertainment, released in 1998, featured hit singles such as "Som San" and "Arai Gaw Yaum." The album went on to sell more than 2,000,000 copies, despite being released during the decline of the Thai alternative scene.

At the end of the 1990s, Mr. Team gained popularity in Thailand. Tannatonn Palakawong na Ayudhaya and Tai Tanawut also gained popularity during that era.

=== The 2000s ===
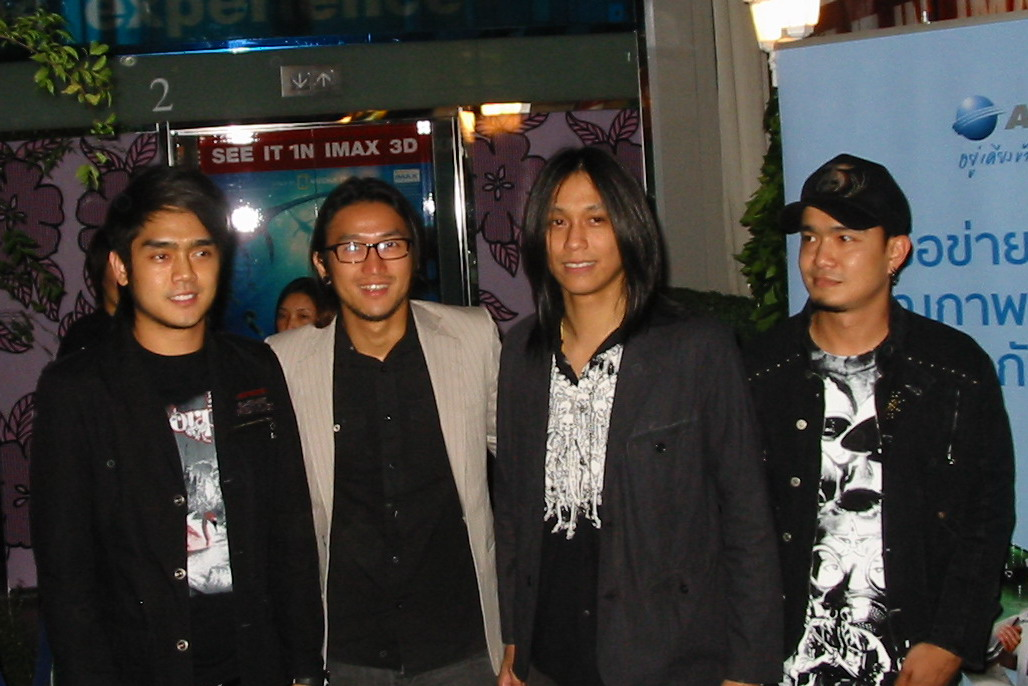
Bodyslam in 2008

In the early 2000s, Thai rock bands drew inspiration from J-rock, with bands like Peak, Clash and Potato.

In 2000, Silly Fools released the album Mint, which sold over 1,000,000 copies, and their later albums, such as Juicy and King Size, solidified their position as one of the most well-known bands of the time, recognized for their alternative rock and nu-metal sound.

In 2001, the Thai band Clash emerged in the commercial music scene with their full-length album titled ONE, distributed by GMM Grammy's UP-G. Their first single, "Gaud (Hug)," was a big hit and led the band to success, while other rock bands like Zeal, Neo-X, Gear Knight, Bangkaew, Bodyslam, So Cool, AB Normal, Klear, and Drama Stream, also achieved greater success in the 2000s.

The band Kala released their single "My Name is Kala," while Big Ass released the album Seven in 2004, featuring the single "Len Kong Soong." The third album by Bodyslam, Believe, was released in April 2005 and made them one of GMM Grammy's premier bands. The success of this album took them on a long national tour over the course of 2005 and part of 2006. They won the 4th Annual Fat Awards for Favorite Album, and "Khwam Chuea" became Song of the Year.

==== Indie scene ====
In the 2000s, Thai indie musicians such as Penguin Villa, Armchair, Cocktail, The Richman Toy, and Basher, achieved commercial success.

Other acts in the rock scene became popular (and eventually went mainstream), such as Tattoo Colour, Flure, Slot Machine, 25 Hours, Slur, Playground, and The Yers, also gained recognition.

==== Metalcore, emo and post-hardcore ====
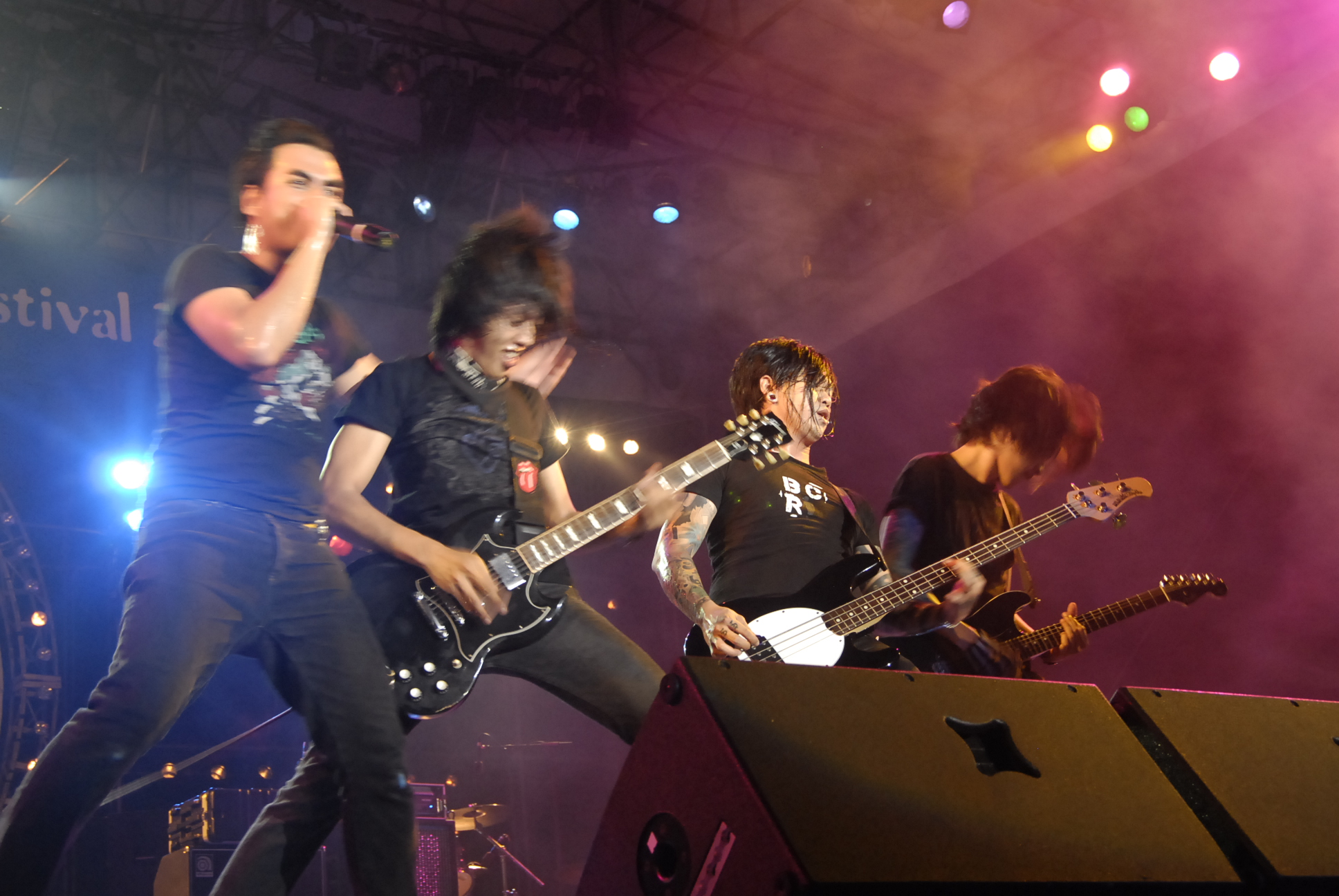
Oblivious, a post-hardcore band (pictured in 2007)

During the mid-2000s, the metalcore genre also began to grow in Thailand. Bands like Ebola, Sweet Mullet, Oblivious, and Retrospect were simultaneously increasing their fan base in the emo and post-hardcore scenes.

Examples include well-known bands like Ebola's Enlighten (2005) and Retrospect's Unleashed (2007), both of which are highly regarded by metalcore listeners.

=== 2010s to 2020s ===
In the early 2010s, rock music remained largely popular in the country, despite declining sales due to the dominance of K-pop, pop, electronic and hip hop, as well as the rise of music streaming services.

The 2010s saw the birth of a new breed of rock and indie artists/bands, including Safeplanet and Three Man Down.

Khun Narin, a psychedelic rock band, blends elements of garage rock and mor lam. Their live album, titled II, was released in 2016 by the Los Angeles-based record label Innovative Leisure Records and produced by a Western producer.

In 2022, the pop-punk band Paper Planes released the single "Song Yang Bad" (Bad Boy). Due to the song's popularity, fueled by social media, the music video reached 200 million views by November 2025 and became the unofficial National Children's Day song.

==== Shoegaze and post-rock ====
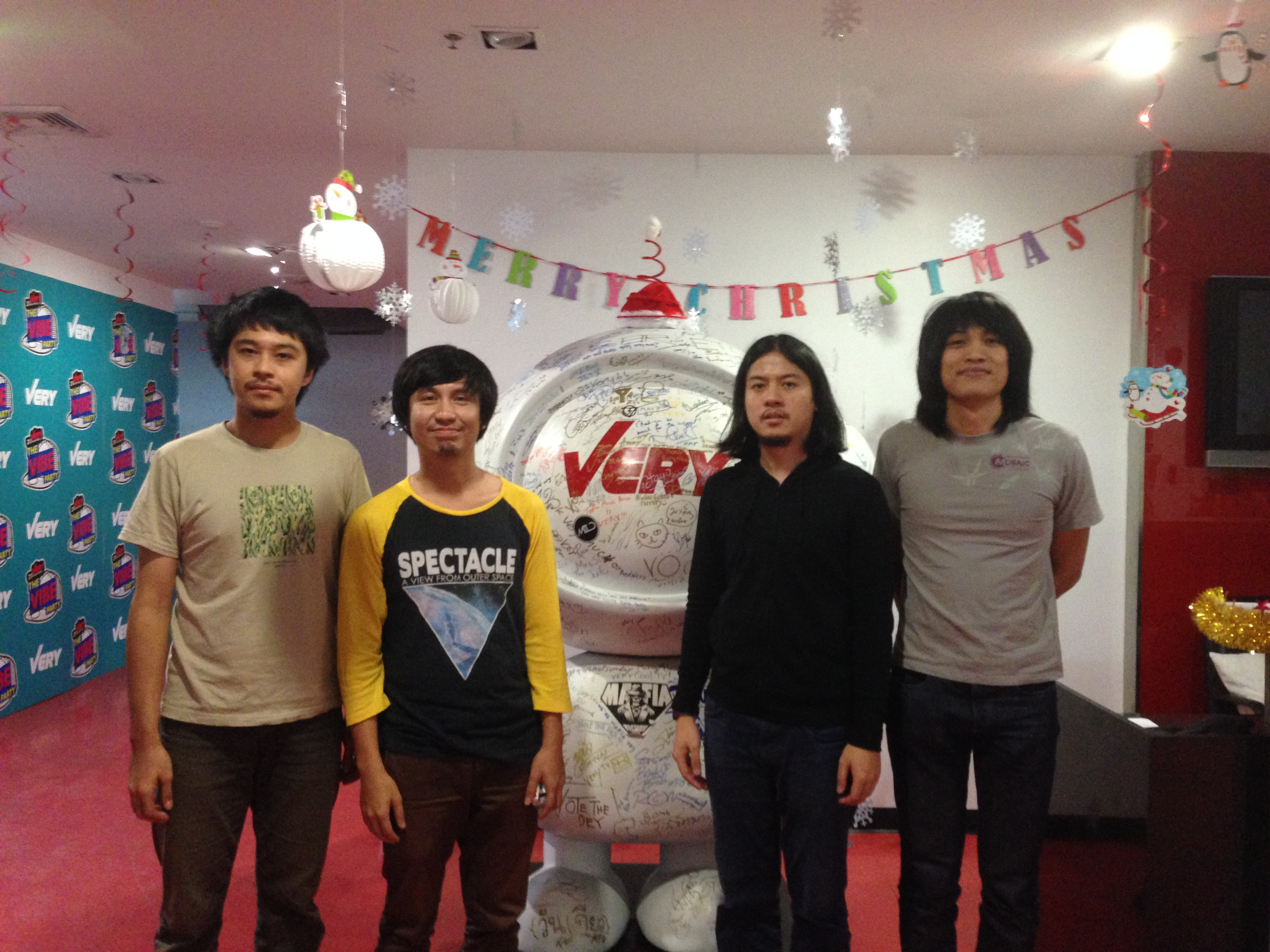
Desktop Error, a shoegaze and indie rock band (pictured in 2013)

From the 2010s to the early 2020s, shoegaze, post-punk, indie rock and post-rock entered the underground scene and gained popularity among fans. Notable post-rock bands include Inspirative and Hope the Flowers; notable shoegaze bands include Desktop Error, Hariguem Zaboy and Yellow Fang.

== See also ==
- Phleng Thai sakol
- Music of Thailand
- Thai contemporary art
- Culture of Thailand
