= Carabao (band) =

Thai phleng phuea chiwit band

Carabao คาราบาว
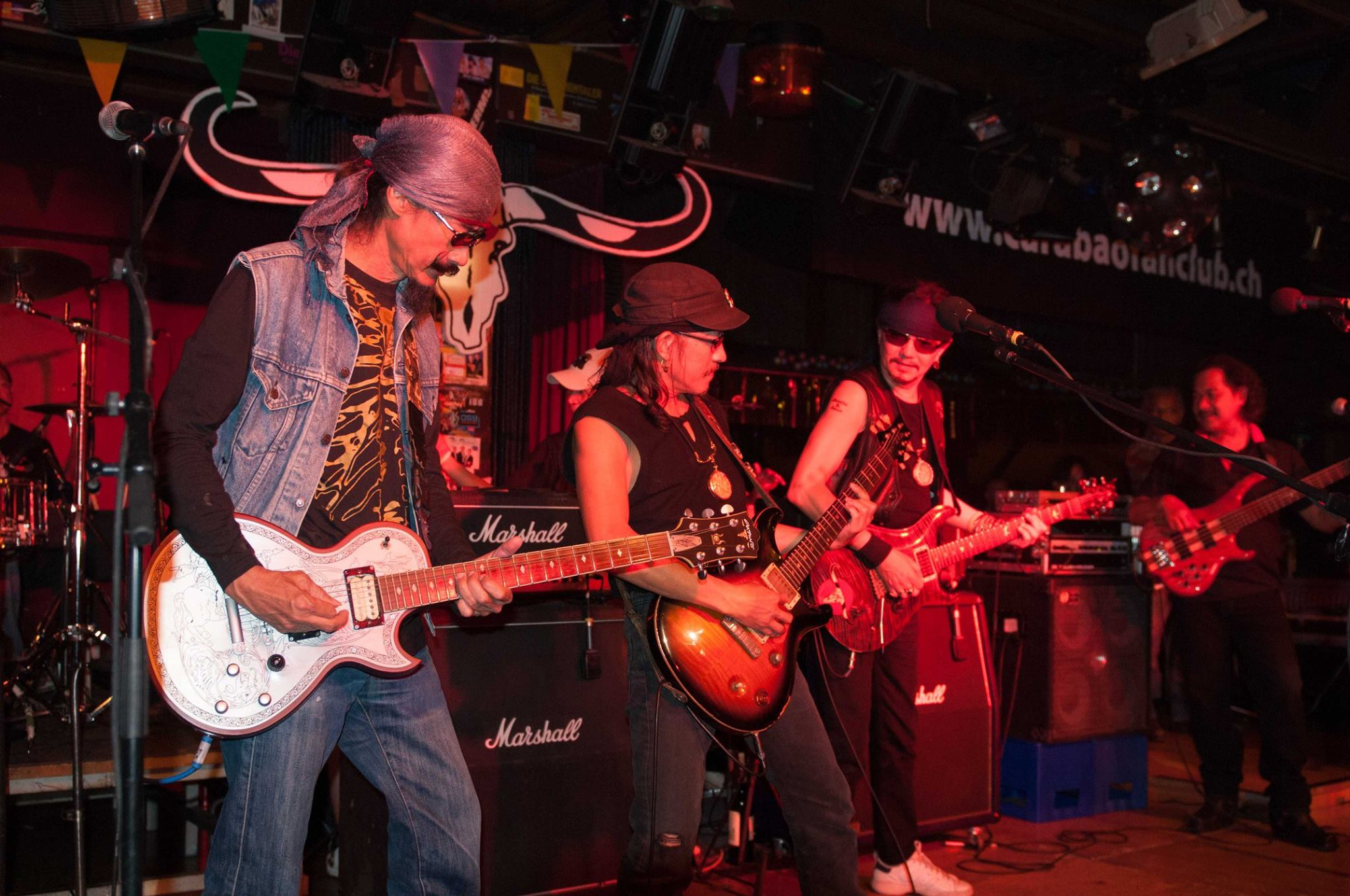
- Carabao in Switzerland, 6 June 2008

Background information
- Origin: Thailand
- Genres: Rock; phleng phuea chiwit; blues rock; country rock; country; folk; R&B; acoustic
- Years active: 1980–present
- Labels: Peacock; Azona; Grammy; Polydor; D-Day; WMG
- Members: Yuenyong Opakul (Aed); Preecha Chanapai (Lek); Thierry Mekwattana (Thierry); Anupong Prathompatama (Ot); Atthanan Thanarunroj (Ko); Khajornsak Hutawatana (Mee); Thepajon Phanthuphongthai (Uan); Aekkaman Piset (Dum)
- Past members: Kirati Promsaka na Sakon Nakhon (Keo or Khiao); Sanit Limsila (Khai); Thanit Siiklindii (Thanit); Amnaat Luukjan (Pao); Pairat Peumchalat (Rat); Luechai Ngamsom (Duk); Chawalit Chalongpong (Koh); Sayaphon Singthong (Nong)
- Website: www.carabao.net

Carabao (Thai: คาราบาว) are a Thai rock / phleng phuea chiwit band popular in Thailand and other Asian countries. The group was formed in 1980 by university students Yuenyong Opakul (Aed), Kirati Promsaka Na Sakon Nakhon (Keo or Khiao) and Sanit Limsila (Khai) who met while studying at Mapúa Institute of Technology in the Philippines. The word carabao means "buffalo", a symbol of fighting, hard work and patience.

They are known for their phleng phuea chiwit (เพลงเพื่อชีวิต), or 'songs for life', which came to prominence through the protest songs of the 1970s political upheaval in Thailand, especially from the band Caravan. Carabao have blended the acoustic / folk style of 'phuea chiwit' with other forms of Thai music, western rock and country music, as well as various kinds of world music, like Latin music and reggae, earning such labels as 'ethnic rockers' and 'Kings of 3Cha' or 'Rolling Stones of Asia'. MTV Asia hailed them as a "veteran songs-for-life band".

Carabao's songs often tackle social and political issues, demanding social justice and supporting the causes of the ordinary Thai people, but they have also created love songs and more philosophical songs with greater universal themes. Lead singer / songwriter Aed Carabao is loved by many and is also famous for his sharp tongue and open criticism of corrupt politicians, big business, and environmental destruction. At least one or two songs from most of the band's albums up to the mid-'90s were banned by the government and coverage of the band rarely appeared on government TV and radio stations. Despite this, Carabao is the most popular Thai rock group of all time.

== Background ==
Carabao was originally formed in the Philippines with three members, Aed, Keo, and a third member named Khai, all of whom sang and played guitar. They stopped playing together when Aed returned to Thailand. However, Aed continued to play music and write songs, contributing a song to the popular songs for the Thai Muslim life band "Hammer," and playing as a backing member of the band "Hope." After the experience of playing with other bands, he decided that he wanted to revive Carabao so that he could have his own band. He persuaded Keo to return and switch to bass.

== Early albums ==
Carabao released their first album, Lung Khii Maw (ลุงขี้เมา; "The Drunken Old Man"), in 1981, with Aed and Khiao backed by a member of "Hope", as the fledgling band lacked a drummer, lead guitarist or keyboardist. This album featured a simple, primitive folky sound, not drastically different from other Songs for Life bands from that era, although it did feature a noticeable rock influence, something that earlier Songs for Life bands like Caravan and Hammer had lacked. Some of the melodies were borrowed from Asian or Thai folk or rock songs, with the title track based on a Filipino folk melody. The album did not sell many copies, but Aed set about recruiting other members so that the band could effectively perform live.

A major breakthrough came with the recruitment of guitarist/vocalist Preecha Chanapai (Lek). Lek had a distinctive, powerful Santana-like style, and Aed has said that this gave him more confidence in the band. At the time, Lek was playing in a band called "The President Band", and on the band's 2nd album members of that band backed Aed, Lek and Keo, the latter who had by then switched back to guitar. The bass parts were played by President Band bassist Anupong Prathompatama (Ot), who has since gone on to be one of Carabao's longest running members. The resulting album had noticeably more rock-oriented arrangements as compared to their debut, and also had a great deal of influence of American roots music styles.

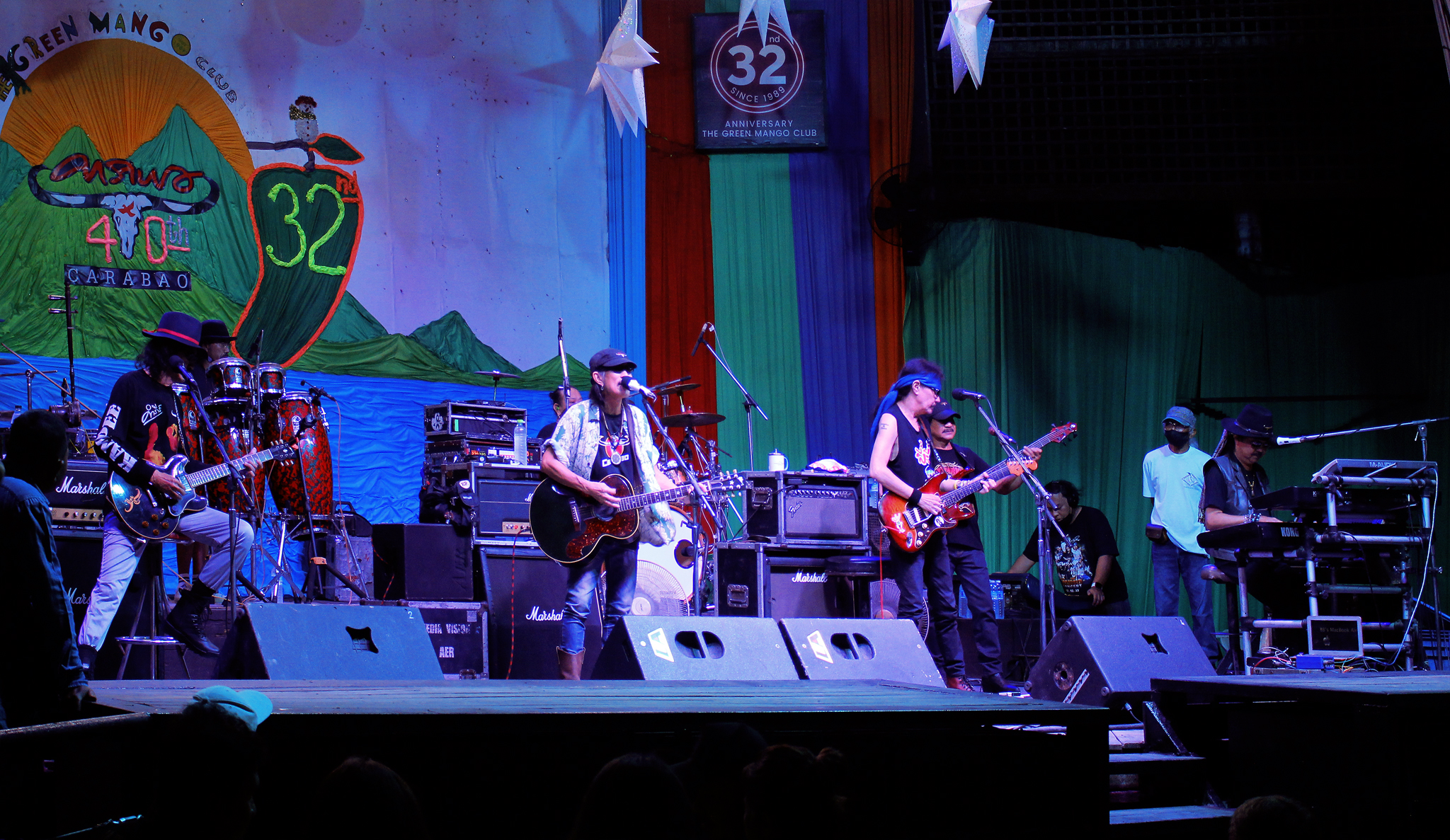
Carabao on stage at their 40th anniversary tour in 2022, The Green Mango Club on Ko Samui.

Carabao first came into the national spotlight with their third album, Waniphok (วณิพก; "The Wandering Minstrel"), the title song of which told the story of a blind street musician and became a major hit. The song featured the distinctive "Samcha" rhythm, a kind of mix of Northeastern Thai folk rhythms like Mo Lam and Luk Thung with Latin beats. Future Carabao albums would feature many songs done in this style. Aed has noted with pride that before Waniphok was released, discos in Thailand played only Western songs, but the catchy indigenous rhythms of the song managed to break down those barriers. While no other songs on the album featured songs done in this style, it featured a strong influence of traditional Thai melodies. Like the second album, Wanipok featured Aed, Khiao and Lek backed by members of the President Band, including Ot on bass.

By their 4th album, they had also added a permanent drummer, Amnaat Luukjan (Pao). At the same time, Aed invited Ot to become the band's official bassist, but since The President Band had plans to go on a US tour, he was unavailable. In his place, the band added Phairat Phoemchalat (Rat) on bass. The album also featured contributions from woodwind player Thanit Siiklindii (Ajaan), as well as backing vocals from Thierry (Ri), both of whom would soon become an official members of the band as well. The album continued to feature the folkier sound of their early albums, but also showcased their growing eclecticism.

== Stardom ==
Carabao's most popular album, Made In Thailand (เมดอินไทยแลนด์), was released in 1984 and sold over four million copies. The title track became a hit in several neighboring countries as well. The album featured a remarkable variety of musical styles, mixing rock, folk, regional Thai styles like Luk Thung and Mo Lam, some reggae and Latin beats, and even some classical Thai music with the song "Refugee."

By this time, woodwind player Thanit Siiklindii (Ajaan) had become a permanent member of the band, and guitarist/vocalist Thierry Mekwattana had joined as well. Meanwhile, Keo's role changed again, becoming a backing vocalist and live multi-instrumentalist. Before touring for 'Made in Thailand,' Rat left and Ot rejoined the band, this time as an official member. The resulting 7 member band, consisting of Aed, Keo, Lek, Ot, Pao, Ajaan and Thierry, is regarded by many fans as their classic lineup.

This lineup recorded several more hit albums in the 1980s, resulting in a powerful, eclectic and increasingly political body of work, with hit songs like "Welcome to Thailand," "Khon Jon Phuyingyai" "Mae Sai" and "Thaplang". The latter song was written about the theft of a holy Thai lintel, the Phra Narai, that later appeared in an American museum, and became the subject of Thai protests in order to regain the lintel. The song's chorus translates as "Take back Michael Jackson, give us back the Phra Narai!"

During this period, Carabao consolidated their position as Thailand's most popular musical group of all time. In terms of musical style, the band remained extremely eclectic, mixing a wide range of Thai and international styles.

== Fragmentation ==
After the "Thaplang" album in 1988, the band began to disintegrate, as members left to start solo careers. First to go were Thierry, Ajan, and Pao, who briefly formed a spinoff band. Reduced to 4 members, on their 10th album, Ham Jot Khwai ("ห้ามจอดควาย") the band returned to playing with backing musicians, this time members of the Thai band 'Tawan.' After recording and touring for the album, Khiao became the next member of the classic lineup to leave, and the band announced a breakup.

However, soon Aed, Lek and Ot were back playing together with some new backing musicians, including Luechai Ngamsom (Duk) on keyboards, vocals and trumpet and Chuchat Nuduang (Ko) on drums. Originally, this band was not called "Carabao," but rather just 'Aed, Lek, Ot,' going by the remaining classic lineup members' nicknames. However, Aed was soon persuaded to revive the Carabao name, and the band continued with the new lineup. With Keo (Khiao) gone, Aed was now technically the band's only original member, although Lek and Ot had also been playing with the band almost from the start.

After their 12th album, Satja 10 Prakan, Carabao fans got another shock with the departure of Lek, who was replaced by Kajonsak Hutawatthana (Mee) on guitar. Although many of the band's fans were unhappy with the band's lineup changes, this version of the band released 3 albums in the early-mid 1990s, with a lower degree of commercial success than before, but still remaining one of Thailand's most dominant bands, and with hit singles like "Raeng Koi" 'Yai Samang' and "Luang Phaw Khun" still getting major airplay on Thailand's radio stations. The new lineup soon added a 6th live member, percussionist and backing vocalist, Sayaaphoon Singthoong (Nong), who would later become an official member of the band. During this period of time, the classic lineup of the band occasionally reunited for live shows.

== Reunion ==
In 1995, the "classic" lineup of the band decided to reunite to celebrate the band's 15th anniversary. They recorded a double album, Hak Huajai Yang Rak Khwai ("หากหัวใจยังรักควาย" - "If You Still Love Buffaloes"), which became the band's biggest hit in years, and re-established them as Thailand's biggest band. However, the reunion did not last, and the Aed-Ot-Duk-Mi-Ko-Nong lineup resumed activities, this time with some production help from Keo.

For their 18th album, Amerikan Anthaphaan, Lek, Thierry and Keo rejoined the band again. While Keo's return to the band did not last, Lek and Thierry continued as Carabao members. The result was a new lineup that combined 4 members of the "classic" band (Aed, Lek, Thierry and Ot) with 4 later members (Duk, Ko, Mee, and Nong), along with a new recruit, percussionist, flutist and drummer named Thepajon Phanthuphongthai (Uan).

== 25th anniversary ==
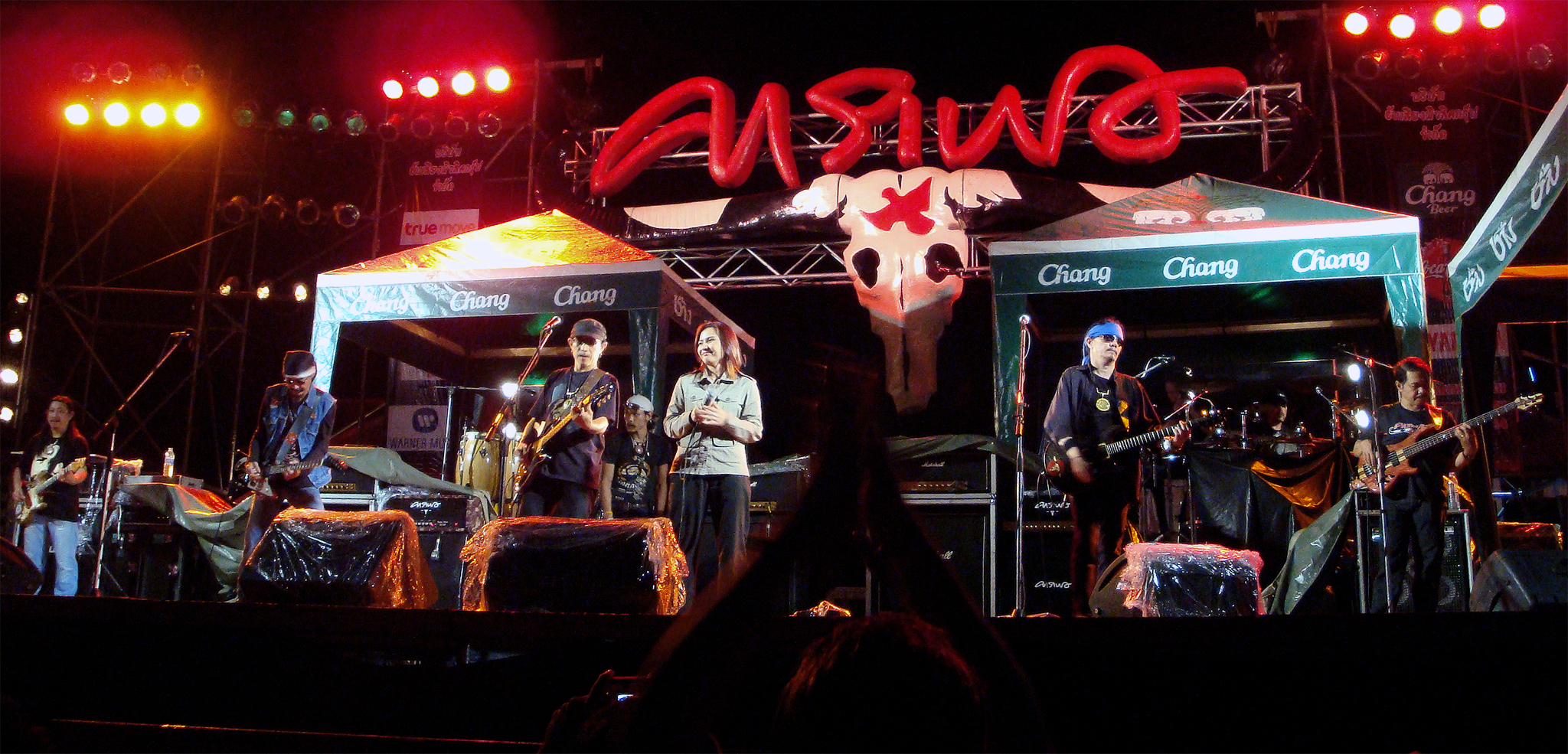
Carabao iat concert on 14 May 2009 in Bo Phut, Koh Samui, Thailand.

Since then, the band has recorded several more albums, with another recent upsurge in critical and commercial success. They have now released a total of 28 official studio albums (Vol. 1 - Vol. 28 / 1981 - 2013), with some special albums, numerous live albums and compilations bringing the total to more than 60. The lineup has also remained stable, although percussionalist Nong left the band due to illness after their 25th albums, and later died. Additionally, classic-era members Keo (Khiao) and Ajaan have occasionally appeared on their post-millennium albums and live shows, though they have not been official members for years.

== 30th anniversary celebration and beyond ==
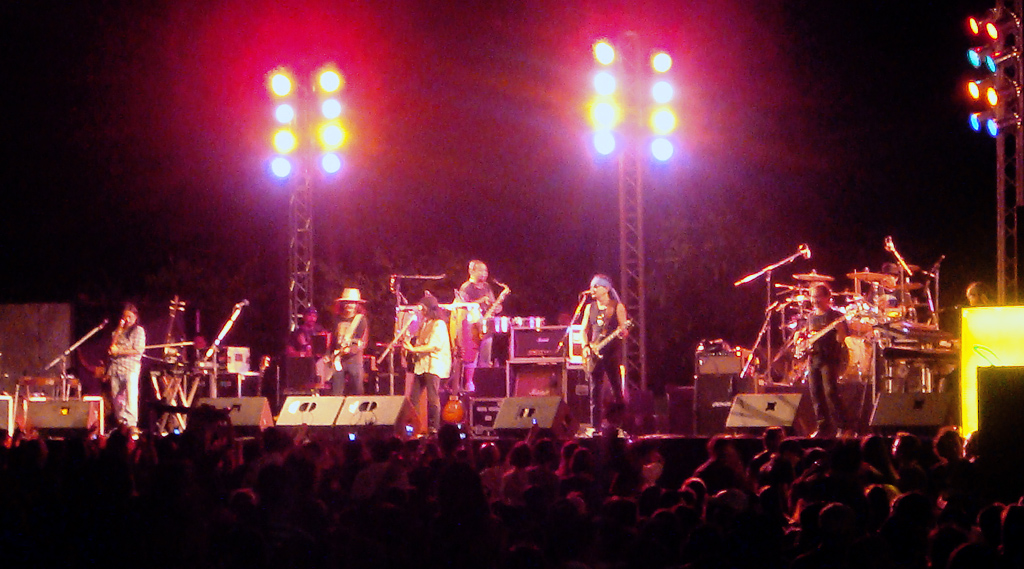
Carabao in concert by Plai Laem Temple, 18 June 2012, Ko Samui.

In 2011, there were a series of 30th anniversary concerts all around Thailand and beyond, the biggest being "Velodrome Returns." The band played nearly 50 songs during this concert, including a twenty-minute medley of 17 sam cha favorites, with time for only one or two verses of each song.

A Carabao convention, the Carabao New Year Expo (7 Days, 7 Themes), was held 21–27 December, that same year. During the day, convention goers viewed displays of Carabao memorabilia, attended music workshops, sang karaoke, and bought Carabao merchandise from the vendors. Each evening of the Expo, for seven nights, there was a Carabao concert on a different theme. (There are easily 500 Carabao songs, not counting Aed Carabao's solo work). Some band members said they had to look up and relearn many of the songs on the playlist, as they had never played them outside a studio. Keo, Ajaan, and others from the classic lineup were back for both Expo and the big 30th Anniversary concert.(Carabao New Year Expo (7 Days, 7 Themes), was held 21–27 December. Available on DVD at eThaiCD.com)

A 30th Anniversary album of new songs was released titled "Gamlang Jai" ("Strength of Spirit" or "Moral Support"), with the theme that the fans and the band provide each other strength of spirit and moral support. This album also included a DVD with music videos of some songs. ("Gamlang Jai" (กำลังใจ). 2011. Carabao 30th Anniversary Album, CD/DVD set. Available at eThaiCD.com) All previous Carabao albums were rereleased for the 30th anniversary.

Since then, Carabao has released one more album, 'Sawadii Phrathet Thai' (Hello Thailand) and has continued to play live with their long-running 8 man lineup, abetted at times with other classic-era members.

== Film, TV series, and other developments ==
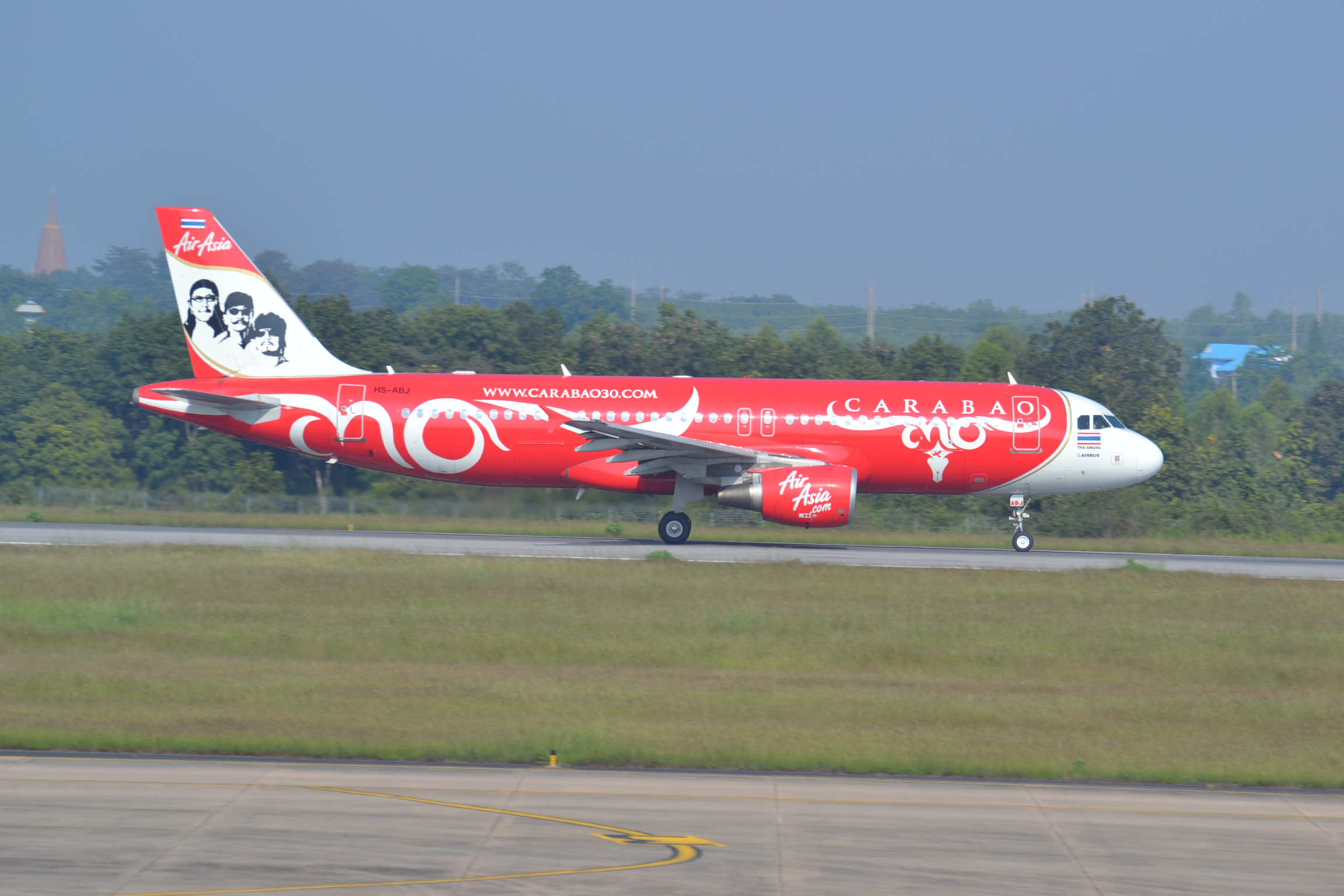
A Thai AirAsia Airbus A320 in a livery celebrating the band's 30th anniversary, seen here at Khon Kaen Airport in October 2013.

In 2013 produced a movie "Young Bao" (‘Bao being short for "Carabao") purporting to tell the origins of the band. (This was actually the second movie to tell this story, the first being เสียงเพลงแห่งเสรีภาพ "Siang Playng Heeng Seripaap" meaning "Music of Freedom" released in 1985, in which the band members played themselves.) In "Young Bao," most of the actors who played the Carabao band members as young people were themselves famous musicians. For instance, Thierry was played by both his own son Jessie Mekwatanna (for the teenager) and by Hugo (for the young adult).("Young Bao." 2013. Movie. Produced by Grand Big Bang. Available on DVD from eThaiCD.com)

In 2013, the band members were able to fulfill their dream of playing with Santana, one of their biggest musical influences. Whether this did or did not go as hoped (both bands played Santana songs with no discussion beforehand and Aed was too starstruck to sing more than a few words), it did lead to the band's Santana-inspired 28th Official Carabao Album (28th in the official series of studio albums, not counting compilations, live albums, and special albums such the collaboration with Parn). The 28th Carabao album "Sawadee Prathet Thai" ("Hello Thailand") released November 2013 contains a song called "Santana Carabao" that is a 50/50 blend of the Santana and Carabao signature sounds. ("Sawadee Prathet Thai"(สวัสดีประเทศไทย). 2013. Carabao 28th Album. CD Available at eThaiCD.com.)

A weekly hour-long TV show "Carabao The Series"(คาราบาว เดอะซีรี่ส์) started up September 2013, and continues to the present (March 2014), with each episode based on the lyrics of a different Carabao song. Carabao songs are famous for their vivid themes and story-telling, with some song subjects, such as the blind street musician of "Wanipok" and or the kind-hearted soldier "Bua Loi" achieving mythical status. So each episode of "Carabao The Series" takes a different Carabao song and turns it into a 40-minute drama. While the dramas may deviate from the plot of the original lyrics, they stick closely to the spirit of the song. Three of the band members, Aed, Lek, and Thierry, introduce each drama by briefly discussing the song for the week, followed by the drama itself, then each episode concludes with a cover of the song by a younger band. ("Carabao The Series"(คาราบาว เดอะซีรี่ส์). TV show. September 2013-?)

In 2014, former band member Nong Carabao died at the age of 50. He had been with the band between 1995 and 2007, when he left because of illness. (By Thai custom a band member, will often (informally) use his band's name as his last name.)

In October 2023, with the increasing age of each member, this makes performing music and concerts each time difficult. Aed, as the leader and founder of the band, has announced the end of the band in April 2024.

In March 2024, keyboardist Luechai Ngamsom or Duk died at the age of 70 of a heart attack. Duk was a Chonburi native and had joined Carabao since 1991 in the album 'Wi Chaa Pae' (The Scapegoat Lessons).

In the Lomwang La Carabao on 3 April 2024, at BCC Hall Central Ladprao was a Carabao concert that had been announced as their last. In the show, Aed announced that he would not end the band in order to continue fighting against the capitalists.

On 26 January 2026 there will be a concert in Ubon Ratchathani to support the soldiers who protect the border of Thailand (see 2025 Cambodia–Thailand conflict).

== Members ==
=== Timeline ===
Carabao has a long and complex history, with multiple lineups and several members who have left and rejoined the band numerous times. Leader/guitarist/vocalist Aed is the only member who has participated in all their albums and tours, although most of their lineups have featured bassist Ot and guitarist Lek.
