= Phleng phuea chiwit =

Type of Thai folk music

- Stylistic origins: Contemporary folk music; folk rock; country; rock; luk thung; mor lam
- Cultural origins: Early 1970s, Bangkok, Thailand
- Typical instruments: Vocal; guitar; bass; drums; keyboard

Other topics
- 1973 Thai popular uprising - luk thung

Phleng phuea chiwit (Thai: เพลงเพื่อชีวิต; IPA:[pʰlēːŋ pʰɯ̂a tɕʰīː.wít]; lit. 'songs for life') describes a type of Thai folk rock, strongly influenced by elements of Western contemporary folk and rock music with a protest theme mainly centred on the hardship of working-class people and in favor of a democratic political system. The term phleng phuea chiwit (songs for life) came from "art for life" or "literature for life", that is, literature on life and society, while phleng phuea chiwit era flourishing in the 1970s also known as "jewel of the literature of life".

In the 1980s, phleng phuea chiwit became less focused on political themes in its lyrics and placed greater emphasis on reflecting societal issues, poverty, and the influences of rural lifestyles. The genre morphed into a more clearly defined style that combined the sound and aesthetic of Western-style folk rock with commercially accessible songwriting, as exemplified by bands like Carabao, Hammer, and artists such as Phongthep Kradonchamnan, and Pongsit Kamphee. Thanapol Intharit became one of the most successful acts in the phleng phuea chiwit and Thai rock scenes of the 1990s.

== History ==
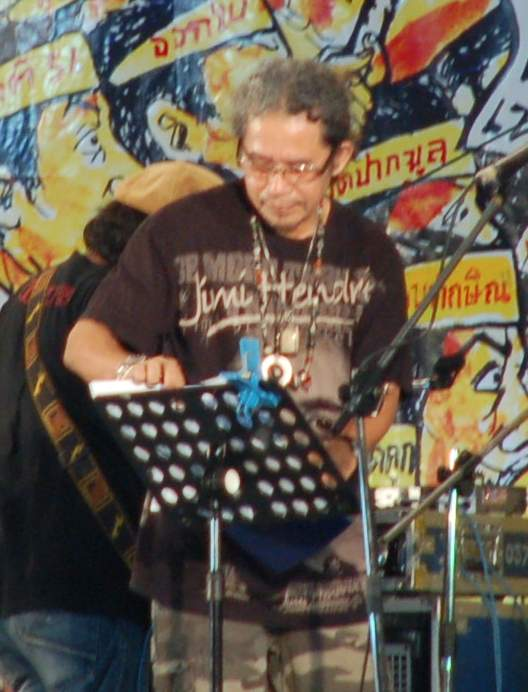
Surachai "Nga" Jantimathawn, lead singer of Caravan.

The philosophical roots of phleng pheua chiwit was in the Art for Life movement led by Marxist thinker Chit Phumisak in 1957.

Phleng phuea chiwit originated from the events of 14 October 1973, when student and popular protests drove off the "three tyrants." The earliest phleng phuea chiwit band was called Caravan, which was formed after the 1973 student massacre. In 1976, police and right wing activists attacked students at Thammasat University. Caravan, along with other bands and activists, fled for the hills. There, Caravan continued playing music for local farmers. Caravan released their albums Khon Kap Khwai (Man and Buffalo, 1975) and Amerikan Antarai (Dangerous American, 1976), inspired by American protest songs.

In the 1980s, after the return of Caravan and their comrades, the band signed a contract with EMI Thailand and recorded an album. The songs on the album were drawn from the era of phleng phuea chiwit and "Phleng Patiwat" (Revolutionary Song). With better sound systems and musical instruments than before, Caravan was able to perform a concert for UNICEF in 1982 at the main auditorium of Thammasat University. They performed the song "Khuen Rang" (Return to the Nest), which marked the beginning of the trend of adapting to the new music business system.

In this era, phleng phuea chiwit songs were produced for commercial purposes, unlike in the past when they were written to support political ideologies. Caravan also experimented with new musical styles, such as Surachai Jantimathawn incorporating rock bands as backup. The band faced severe criticism for imperfections in their performances and ideologies. However, they learned and trained themselves, eventually competing in the Thai music business. This allowed Caravan to establish themselves as professionals, gaining the freedom to express themselves in their own unique way, which was eventually accepted by the public.

Later, a band named Carabao, which followed in the footsteps of Hammer, became incredibly successful in managing the business side of the music industry. Carabao's song "Waniphok" was a major success, reviving the phleng phuea chiwit trend and becoming a defining moment in the Thai music scene. Additionally, bands and artists such as Pongsit Kamphee, Caravan, Phongthep Kradonchamnan, Carabao, Hope, Kon Dan Kwian, Ritthiporn Insawang, Su Boonliang, Niranam, Zuzu, Indochine, Kanthai, and many others played a significant role in propelling the phleng phuea chiwit movement to new heights.

Over time, phleng phuea chiwit evolved from protest songs and ideological expressions to songs that reflected societal issues. They gradually shifted away from political violence and became more focused on addressing political trends, economic changes, and the rise of capitalism and consumerism. Folk music's entry into the Thai music market was a strategic success, helping it expand widely and gain mainstream acceptance.

== Styles ==
Phleng phuea chiwit typically incorporates elements of Western as well as Thai folk ballads, more rhythmic Thai styles such as samcha, mor lam, and luk thung, and occasionally elements of Thai classical music as well. More recently, elements of reggae, ska and Latin music have found their way into the genre as well. As for the instrumentation, early phleng phuea chiwit was generally in a more folk style, with acoustic instruments, while later versions often more rock-style arrangements, with electric guitars, bass, and drums. Many artists also use Thai instruments such as the phin, wut, khluay, and saw. Some phleng phuea chiwit artists were inspired by Western musicians including Bob Dylan, Bob Marley, Santana, Creedence Clearwater Revival, Eagles, Simon & Garfunkel, and Neil Young.
