= Clash (Thai band) =

Thai rock band

- Origin: Bangkok, Thailand
- Genre: Rock
- Years active: 1997-2011, 2018-2022 (Hiatus)
- Labels: UP^G Record, DUCKBAR, GMM Grammy, GRAND MUSIK
- Members: Preeti Barameeanant (Bank); Chodchapak Pholthanachod (Pon); Thapana Na Bangchang (Hack); Sukrit Sripaoraya (Zum); Anan Dapphetthikon (Yak)

Clash (stylized in all caps) is a Thai rock band. They released their first album in 2001 and are known for their emotional rock ballads. The band was founded in 2001 by Preeti Barameeanant (lead vocals), Chodchapak Pholthanachod (guitar), Thapana Na Bangchang (guitar), Sukrit Sripaoraya (bass), and Anan Dapphetthikon (drum). The band signed to UP G record in 2001 and up until now they have released 5 albums, 2 greatest hits albums, and 2 special acoustic albums.

== History ==
The band first united as "Lucifer" in order to participate in the second and third Hot Wave Music Awards Contest. After winning the contest they signed a deal and joined UP G record (under the GMM Grammy records banner) in 2001, and changed their band name to "Clash" and released their first album "ONE". Their first single "Guad (Hug)" was a hit and led the young band to success.

In February 2003 Clash went back to the studio and released their second album "Soundshake". The album had two hit singles "Ter Ja Yoo Gup Chun Dtalot Bai" and "Kor Chet Nam Dta". 2003 also saw Bank record a solo song "Nueng mitr chid klai" for the International hit Thai movie "Beautiful Boxer". Towards the end of 2003 Clash joined 6 other Grammy bands for 2 special rock albums under the banner "Little Rock Project", the albums also saw a spin-off concert in November 2003 and success of the single "Aow pai luey!", which Clash recorded with the band Kala.

Then in 2004 they released their third album "Brainstorm" which fans praised and gave the album good reviews. 2004 also saw Bank star in the Thai movie "Pun X Dek Sood Kua" along with longtime friend and fellow singer Num, from the band Kala, the movie featured the hit song Pleng ruk pun X, which saw release on the movie's OST. At the end of 2004 GMM Grammy chose to end the year by releasing a special album to celebrate their 20th anniversary. The album featured Clash and 3 other bands (Kala, AB Normal and Potato) singing some of the greatest hits from Grammy's 20 years, the album was titled "Pack-4". Artists such as Loso, Silly Fools and Asanee Wasan were covered by the young bands. Clash covered songs made famous by Joe & Kong, Y-Not-7 and Maew Jirasak Panpoom.

January 2005 saw Clash join the other Pack-4 bands for the hit spin-off concert "Pack 4 Freedom Romantic Rock". In the October 2005, they released their fourth album "Emotion" which includes the hit single "Lakorn Luk Tae" and is accompanied by three other singles like "Sop Tee Ogk Chun", "Pleng Peua Seau", and "Fai Ruk".

March 2006 saw them release a second acoustic album and on March 11 they finally held their very own first concert. July saw them release their 2nd Greatest hits Album. The hit song "Naang Fa Kon Derm" was the official theme song of Andrew Gregson's first directed lakorn called " Sa Doot Ruk" starring Andrew Gregson and Buachompoo Ford. In October 2006 they released a new single called "Kaang Ka". On November 25, 2006, they released their 5th album called Crashing and their first single Kaang Ka was already topping music charts in Thailand.

In 2006, Bank revealed that his mom was seriously ill and was suffering from a chromosome condition, which was affecting her white blood cells to the point where she could not walk. This condition may develop eventually into leukemia. Due to his mother's illness, Bank attempted to make money in order to pay for the treatment of his dearly loved mother. So far, Bank has paid millions for her treatment; to the point where he has to take his mother to the hospital for blood transfusions every day. "I feel 100x times more pain than my mother. When I am with her and see her beautiful smile, it gives me the inspiration and the strength to keep fighting for her. Nowadays, every penny I make is for the usage of my mother’s treatment. I don’t know to what amount it's going to cost, but whatever it is, I will try and make it so that my mother will be better again.” said Bank when he was interviewed on the Thai TV Talk Show "Bangkok Rama". Bank's mother died in 2007. The song, "Wung Won" is dedicated to her.

As of July 2010, Clash declared that they would be disbanding the group, to pursue their own personal interests and that the disbandment was not due to any internal conflicts. Their last song, titled "Pleng Sut Tai" or "The Last Song", included their fans singing during the chorus. A farewell concert, "Clash Rebirth The Final Concert", was set for the band on April 30.

After they disbanded, Bank became a solo artist named BANKK CA$H, Hack went with his new band, SDF. Zum and Yak formed their new band, Shade.

== Members ==
- Preeti Barameeanant (Bank): Vocalist
- Chodchapak Pholthanachod (Pol): Guitarist
- Thapana Na Bangchang (Hack): Guitarist
- Sukrit Sripaoraya (Zum): Bassist
- Anan Dapphetthikon (Yak): Drummer

== Plagiarism controversies ==
Clash has been criticized by many Thai reviewers due to some songs having a similar structure to Luna Sea's songs. For example, "Kang Ka" (ค้างคา) has been argued to have a very similar intro and structure to "Up to You." They have also been accused of stealing the name of the English band the Clash.

== Discography ==
=== Studio albums ===
- Album One (2001)
- Soundshake (2003)
- Brainstorm (2004)
- Emotion (2005)
- Crashing (2006)
- Rock of Ages (2008)
- Nine Miss U 2 (2010)
- LOUDNESS (2020)

=== Acoustic albums ===
- Soundcream (2003: Special Acoustic Album)
- Smooth Clash (2006: Special Acoustic Album)
- Fan (2007: Special Album)
- Army Cheewit Mittraphap Quamrak (Life Friend Love) (2009: Special Album)

=== Side project albums ===
- Little Rock Project Part 1 and 2 (2003 Special GMM Grammy Album)
- Pun X Dek Sood Kua: OST (2004)
- Pack-4 Part 1 and 2 (2004 Special GMM Grammy Anniversary Album)

=== Compilation albums ===
- Crazy Clash (2004: Greatest hits from 2001–2004)
- Very Clash (2006: Very best Album)
- Clash Rare ////Special Album//// (2011)
- Clash All Hits (2013)
- CLASH: 12 YEARS CLASH ALWAYS [BOX SET 12 Album 13 CDs] (2014)

=== Live concerts ===
- Funsize Friday: Rock Size S Concert (2003 Live Concert VCD)
- Pack 4 Freedom Romantic Rock (2005 Live Concert Album and VCD)
- First Clash concert (2006 Concert VCD)
- Clash Army Rock Concert (2007 Concert VCD & DVD)
- Malang Rock Day Concert #4: Rock Monster (2008 VCD & DVD)
- Clash Army Rock Concert 2 (2009 CD & DVD)
- Clash USA Tour 4 Month (2009)
- Clash Rebirth The Final Concert (2011 CD & DVD)
- Clash Awake Concert (2018 BOXSET & DVD)
- The Gentlemen Live Concert 2020
