= Genie Records =

Thai record label

- Parent company: GMM Grammy (1998-2023); GMM Music (2023-present)
- Founded: 1 January 1998; 28 years ago
- Founder: Wichian Rerkpaisan
- Distributor: GMM Music
- Genre: Rock
- Country of origin: Thailand

Genie Records (Thai: จีนี่ เรคคอร์ด) (stylized as genie records) is a Thai record label and a subsidiary of GMM Grammy that focuses on rock music genre. The label's current acts include Paradox, Big Ass, Bodyslam, Potato and Labanoon. It was founded by Wichian Rerkpaisan, who was also its managing director for more than twenty one years.

== History ==
Genie Records was formed on 1 January 1998 through GMM Grammy and appointed Wichian Rerkpaisan to be its pioneering managing director. The record label initially produced several acts which covered a variety of music genres, one of which was Sumet and the Pang, a musical duo who became popular with their first album. It also introduced new artists in the entertainment industry, which eventually produced hit songs, such as Tanawut Chawathanavorakul (Tai), Palaphol Pholkongseng, Noppasin Sangsuwan (Num Kala), Budokan, Venus and Dajim. At that time, it was competing with More Music, the country's leading rock music record label, which had veteran rock artists such as Asanee–Wasan, Loso, Nuvo, Blackhead, Silly Fools and Zeal.

The rock band Big Ass, who was previously with the record label Music Bugs, became part of Genie Records in 2004. It was followed by the new pop-rock band Bodyslam who also came from the same record label. Both bands later released their respective albums, "Seven" by Big Ass and "Believe" by Bodyslam which topped the music charts at that time. Underground bands were also introduced by the record label to the mainstream music listeners with the introduction of bands such as Ebola, Sweet Mullet and Retrospect.

Around 2012, the record label was rebranded into "genie rock" to focus primarily on producing music in the rock genre. They welcomed both new and veteran rock artists such as Labanoon, The Yers, Palmy, 25 Hours, Paper Planes and Potato, who came back to Genie Records after its short-lived stint in We Records and WerkGang.

They held their first major concert "Genie Fest G16" on 10 May 2014 at IMPACT Muang Thong Thani celebrating Genie Records' 16th founding anniversary and was followed by "Genie Fest G19" held on 10 February 2018 at Rajamangala National Stadium.

On 1 July 2019, its founder and managing director Wichian Rerkpaisan, who also goes by the name of "Nick Genie", confirmed in a Facebook post that he was ending his role in Genie Records after his contract with GMM Grammy expired. He later expounded in an interview after leaving Genie Records that he was initially disappointed with the abrupt decision since he already considered it as his home but made it clear that he respected the decision.

== Roster ==
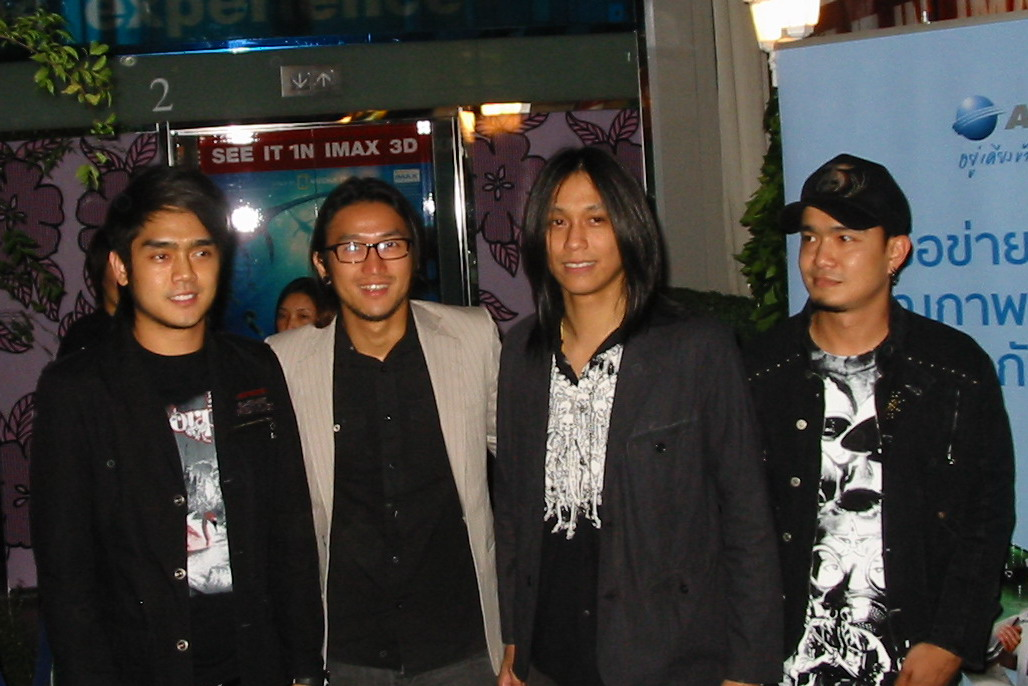
Bodyslam

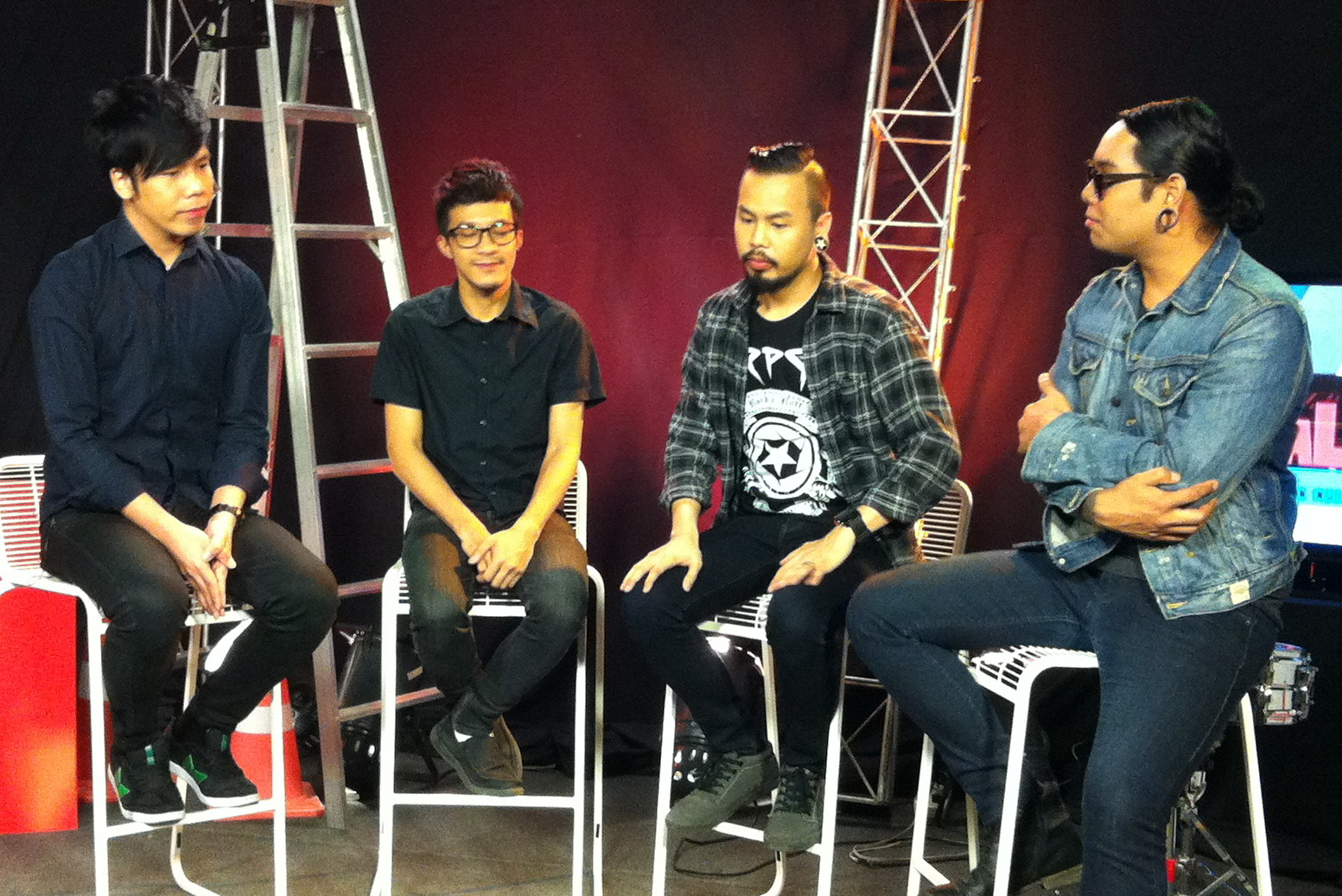
Retrospect

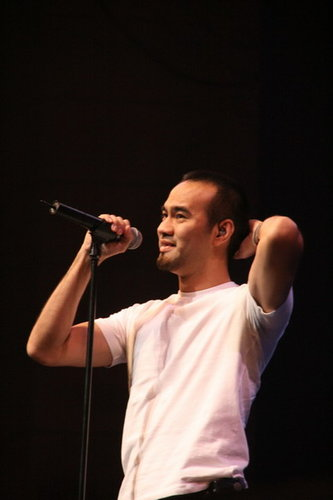
Nakharin Kingsak

=== Current acts ===
==== Soloists ====
- Nakharin Kingsak (Pang)
- Noppasin Sangsuwan (Num Kala)
- Palaphol Pholkongseng (Pala Phon)
- Sirisilp Chotvijit (Kwang AB Normal)
- Jedsada Laddachayaporn (Pun Basher)
- Uefa Hari
- Tippsy
- Joey Phuwasit
- Boy Peacemaker
- Kwang AB
- The White Hair Cut

==== Bands ====
- Paradox
- Big Ass
- Labanoon
- Potato
- Bodyslam
- Sweet Mullet
- The Yers
- Instinct
- The Mousses
- Klear
- Yes'sir Days
- Paper Planes
- Lomosonic
- The Whitest Crow
- Bomb at Track
- Clockwork Motionless
- Lingrom
- Fool Step
- Wallrollers
- To people
- New Travelers
- Retrospect
- Palmy

=== Past ===
- Nakharin Kingsak (Pang)
- No More Tear
- Fukfang
- 25 Hours
- Cocktail
- Ebola
- DaJim
- Tai Tanawut
- Sumeth & The Punk

== Concerts ==
Concert name	Date	Venue	Ref.
Genie Fest G16	10 May 2014	IMPACT Muang Thong Thani	
Genie Fest G19	10 February 2018	Rajamangala National Stadium	
Genie Fest 2020: Rock Mountain	9 February 2020	Jolly Land Starlight Amphitheater	
Genie Fest G27	21 February 2026	Rajamangala National Stadium	
