= 2017 Joox Thailand Music Awards =

Awarding ceremony given by JOOX Thailand

1st JOOX Thailand Music Awards
- Date: 23 March 2017
- Location: Centerpoint Studio, Bangkok, Thailand
- Presented by: JOOX Thailand
- Hosted by: Utt Panichkul; Panissara Phimpru

Television/radio coverage
- Network: JOOX App

The 1st JOOX Thailand Music Awards was an awarding ceremony presented by JOOX Thailand, giving recognition to the Thai entertainment industry in the field of music for their achievements in the year 2016.

The awards night was held at the Centerpoint Studio, Bangkok, Thailand on Thursday, 23 March 2017 and broadcast through the JOOX app.

== Awards ==
Nominations were announced on 14 February 2017. Winners are listed first and highlighted in bold:

Song of the Year	Artist of the Year
**"อ้าว" (Ao) by Chanakan Rattana-udom**; "ไอม์ซอร์รี (สีดา)" (I'm Sorry (See Da)) by The Rube; "เพื่อนรัก" (Phuen Rak) by The Parkinson; "คนมีเสน่ห์" (Kon Mee Sanay) by Nakharin Kingsak; "มันเป็นใคร" (Man Pen Khrai) by Polycat	**Labanoon**; Mild; Polycat; UrboyTJ; Chanakan Rattana-udom
New Artist of the Year	Breakthrough Artist of the Year
**UrboyTJ**	**Chanakan Rattana-udom**; The Rube; UrboyTJ; The Parkinson; Kong Huayrai
Pop Song of the Year	Rock Song of the Year
**"อ้าว" (Ao) by Chanakan Rattana-udom**; "อย่าให้ฉันคิด" (Yah Hai Chun Kit) by Room 39; "เค้าก่อน" (Khao Kon) by UrboyTJ; "ที่จริงเราไม่ได้รักกัน" (Tee Jing Rao Mai Dai Ruk Gun) by Mild; "เรื่องที่ขอ" (Reuang Tee Kor) by Lula	**"ไอม์ซอร์รี (สีดา)" (I'm Sorry (See Da)) by The Rube**; "คนไม่จำเป็น" (Khon Mai Champen) by Getsunova; "ความฝันกับจักรวาล" (Kwahm Fun Gup Jukkrawahn) by Bodyslam; "ฤดูฝน" (Reudoofon) by Paradox; "สิ่งของ" (Sing Kaung) by Klear
Indie Song of the Year	Luk Thung/Pua Chewit of the Year
**"มันเป็นใคร" (Man Pen Khrai) by Polycat**; "ไม่คิดถึงเลย" (Mai Khit Teung Loei) by Nap a Lean; "ขอวอน 2" (Kho Won 2) by Somkiat; "เหงา เหงา" (Ngao Ngao) by Waruntorn Paonil; "เพื่อนรัก" (Phuen Rak) by The Parkinson	**"คู่คอง" (Khu Kong) by Kong Huayrai**; "อ้ายมีเหตุผล" (Ai Mee Het Phon) by Ble Patumrach R-Siam; "รูปไม่หล่อมีสิทธิ์ไหมครับ" (Roop Mai Lor Mee Sit Mai Krup) by Cowboy; "บอกรัก แต่บ่รู้สึก" (Bok Rak Tae Bor Roo Seuk Wa Rak) by Tai Orathai; "หลวงพี่ 4G" (Luang Pee 4G) by Jazz Chuanchuen
International Artist of the Year	Hit Phrase of the Year
**Charlie Puth**; Ed Sheeran; The Chainsmokers; Fifth Harmony; Justin Bieber	**"อ้าว" (Ao) by Chanakan Rattana-udom**; "มันเป็นใคร" (Man Pen Khrai) by Polycat; "เฟสก็หาย ไลน์ก็เงียบ" (Fet Ko Hai Lai Ko Ngiap) by Ble Patumrach R-Siam; "คนมีเสน่ห์" (Kon Mee Sanay) by Nakharin Kingsak; "เค้าก่อน" (Khao Kon) by UrboyTJ
Pub Hits of the Year
**"อ้าว" (Ao) by Chanakan Rattana-udom**; "คนมีเสน่ห์" (Kon Mee Sanay) by Nakharin Kingsak; "พบกันใหม่" (Phop Kan Mai) by Polycat; "คนไม่จำเป็น" (Khon Mai Champen) by Getsunova; "Unfriend" by Helmetheads
