= Chueak Wiset =

Single by LABANOON
- Language: Thai
- Released: August 26, 2015
- Genre: Rock; R&B; hip hop
- Label: GMM Grammy

"Chueak Wiset" (English: Magic Rope) is a single from the band Labanoon from the album NEWS with Genie Records, a subsidiary of GMM Grammy. The lyrics were written by Khajorndet Promraksa (Kob Big Ass ), the melody was composed by Methee Arun, and the song was arranged by Labanoon. The song's content tells the story of unrequited love. This single was a success nationwide.

Magic Rope is the only slow song on the NEWS album, written by Khajorndet Promraksa (Kob Big Ass ). It is about unrequited love. The song was originally going to be called "Yu Mai Suk" but was changed to reflect that even a magic rope cannot bind a broken heart.

The music video for "Magic Rope" was released on August 26, 2015, directed by Suttasit Decha-inthararak, with Sarach Yooyen, captain of the Thai national football team competing in the 2015 SEA Games, and Pattira Sarutiphongphokin appearing in the music video. This made the song a huge success and set a record for the fastest song to reach 100 million views on YouTube in Thailand. And in 2019, it was the song with the most views on YouTube in Thailand. As of 8 December 2025, the song has 565,978,165 views on YouTube, being the 2nd most viewed Thai MV on YouTube.

== Music contributors ==
Labanoon

- Methi Arun – lead vocals, guitar and composer
- Anan Saman - Bass
- Natthanon Thong-on – drums

Other participants

- Phongsaran Phumthip – Produced
- Khajondet Promraksa and Mango Team – Lyrics Directors
- Worawut Wiwattanawanich, Akarapong Srikuakul – Sound Engineer
- Saowani Pomthaworn, Patchara Rattanarun, Wasawat Hanlamyuang – Assistant Engineer
- Pramuan Locharoen – Drum Technician
- Poonsak Chaturabul, Khajondet Phromraksa – Executive Producer

== Response ==
The single was a nationwide success, setting a record for the fastest song to reach 100 million views on YouTube in Thailand, taking only 2 months. It was also the first music video to break the record for the number of views on YouTube, reaching 300 million views. It was also the first song in Thailand to reach 500 million views. The word "Magic Rope" was also the most searched keyword on Google in 2015.

== Charts ==
| Chart (2015) | Peak position |
|---|---|
| Seed FM Chart Top 20 | 1 |
| 95.5 FM Virgin Hits Chart Top 40 | 6 |
| EFM Chart 94 Top Airplay | 4 |
| GMM Grammy G Member Song Chart Top 100 | 4 |
| GMM Grammy G Member Song Chart Top 5 | 4 |
| GMM Grammy G Member MV Chart Top 100 | 13 |

== Awards and nominations ==
| Award presenter | Award Branch | result |
|---|---|---|
| The Guitar Mag Awards 2016 | Popular single of the year | Award-winning |
| M Thai Top Talk About 2016 | Popular songs online | Award-winning |
