= Artiwara Kongmalai =

Thai musician (born 1979)

Artiwara Kongmalai อาทิวราห์ คงมาลัย PBh
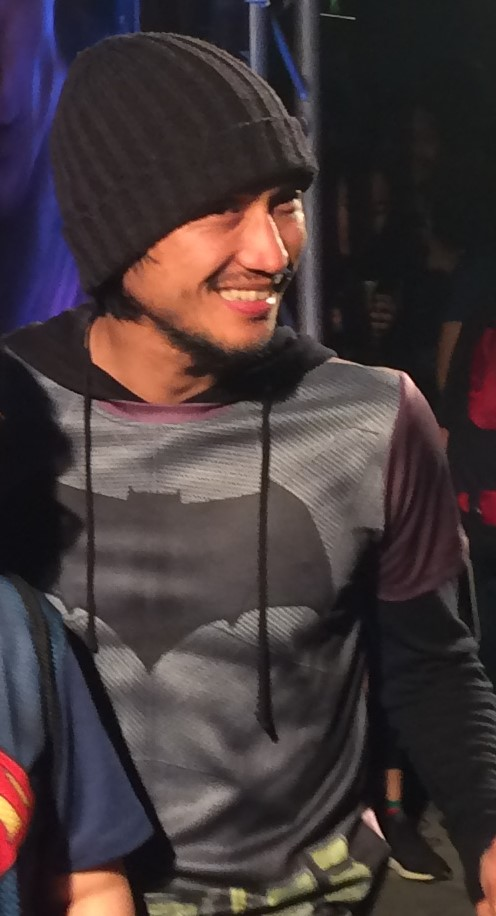

Background information
- Born: 30 May 1979 (age 47); Suphan Buri Province, Thailand
- Genres: Alternative rock
- Occupations: Singer; actors; charities; sportspeople; YouTubers
- Instrument: Vocal
- Years active: 1996–present
- Label: GMM Grammy

Artiwara Kongmalai (Thai: อาทิวราห์ คงมาลัย), or nickname Toon (born 30 May 1979), is a Thai rock music singer and vocalist from the Thai popular music band Bodyslam.

== Early life and careers ==
He was born on 30 May 1979. He is the nephew of Aed Carabao, and is a cousin of Bongkot Kongmalai. He finished his secondary education at Suankularb Wittayalai School, and third degree from Faculty of Communication Arts, Chulalongkorn University.

He started his music career on stage in 1996 in the music contest "Hot Wave Music Awards", and signed-on with the recording label Music Bucks, until 2002 when he joined Thanadol Changsawek and Nathaphol Phannachet and founded the rock band Bodyslam, signed with the recording label GMM Grammy.

Before entering the music industry, after graduating, he worked as a flight attendant for Cambodia Airlines for two years.

He had a platonic relationship with Rachawin Wongweeriya.

== Charities ==
He founded a running project Gaw Khon La Gaw (Thai: ก้าวคนละก้าว, Step by step), to run and donate money to hospitals in Thailand to buy medical equipment.

- In 2016 he raised money for the Bang Saphan Hospital, donating 85 million Baht.
- In 2018, he raised money for 11 hospitals in Thailand, donating 700 million to billion Baht.

== Discography ==
=== Collaborations ===
- 2000 – Sak Eoai (with Big Ass)
- 2003 – Khong Mee Khom (with Big Ass)
- 2010 – Kid Hoad (with Siriporn Ampaipong)
- 2017 – Nak Phajon Mueng (with Mike Phiromphon, Phai Phongsathon and Tai Orathai)

=== Practical songs ===
- 2010 – Saeng Sud Thay
- 2013 – Ruea Lek Kuan Oak Jark Fang

== Filmography ==
- 2011 – SuckSeed

== Commercials and endorsements ==
- Coffee Birdy
- Lod Wan La Thung Khun Tham Day by 7-Eleven in Thailand.
- M-150

=== Master of Ceremony: MC ===
Year	Thai title	Title	Network	Notes	With
2021–present	KT’s Journey		YouTube:Rachwin Journey		
