= Fahrenheit (Thai band) =

- Origin: Bangkok, Thailand
- Genres: Thai rock, Soft Rock, Pop rock, Speed metal
- Years active: 2002–present
- Label: More Music
- Members: Piraporn Pranpanas; Kittisak Khotkam; Arkom Nuchanin; Chamnan Khamenchan
- Past members: Apirath Sukkhajitr; Pichet Kruawan

Fahrenheit (Thai: ฟาเรนไฮต์) is a Thai rock supergroup featuring a female lead vocalist, Piraporn Pranpanas, backed by former members of other well-known Thai rock bands. Guitarist Pichet Kruawan is from Y Not 7 while drummer Kittisak and founding bassist Apirath Sukkhajitr are from Loso. Bassist Apirath left the band to rejoin Loso, and Arkom Nuchanin (from Taxi) joined Fahrenheit in March 2006. Despite no new album during that period, the band's new lineup could be seen in live concerts. Pichet Kruawan left the band after Fahrenheit Way album and is replaced by Chamnan Khamenchan from SYAM band. The band also plays backup for Asanee-Wasan.

The band's songs include "Yah hak lang" ("อย่าหักหลัง", translation "Don't betray me"), "Naam dtaa keu kam dtop" ("น้ำตาคือคำตอบ", "My tears are my answer"), "Ngiap tam-mai" ("เงียบทำไม", "Why so quiet?") and "Pid mai" ("ผิดไหม", "Is it wrong?").

== Members ==
- Piraporn Pranpanas (Sai): Vocals.
- Chamnan Khamenchan (Nan): Guitar
- Kittisak Khotkam (Yai) : Drums (b. January 22, 1973)
- Arkom Nuchanin (Ake) : Bass (b. June 14, 1974)

== Discography ==
- Degree Fahrenheit (องศาฟาเรนไฮต์) (January 2005)
- Extra Fahrenheit (December 2005) (special album with rearranged songs and two new songs)
- Fahrenheit Way (September 2006)
