= Bodyslam (band) =

Thai rock band

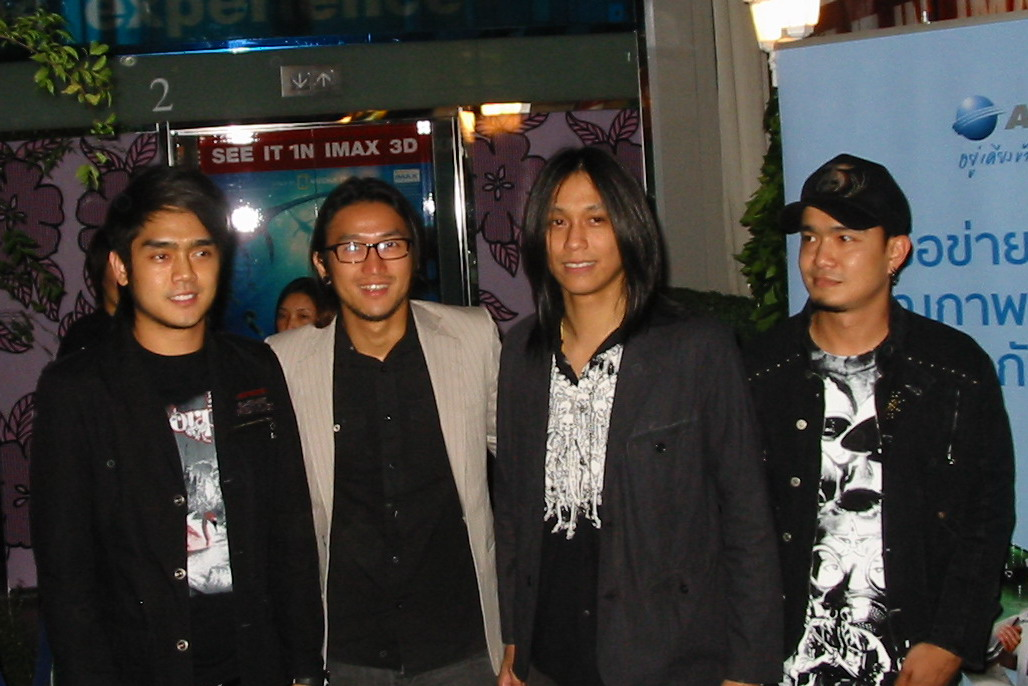
- Bodyslam in 2008; L-R: Pid, Toon, Yod, Chad

Background information
- Origin: Bangkok, Thailand
- Genres: Phleng phuea chiwit Alternative rock Hard rock Pop punk Post-hardcore; Acoustic rock Pop rock (as La-On)
- Years active: 2002 – present
- Label: genie records · GMM Music
- Members: Atiwara "Toon" Kongmalai (vocals, rhythm guitar); Thanachai "Yod" Tantrakul (lead guitar); Thanadol "Pid" Changsawek (bass); Suchuch "Chad" Chaneed (drums); Ohm Plengkham (keyboards)
- Past members: Ratthapol "Pao" Pannachet

Bodyslam (Thai: บอดี้สแลม) is a Thai rock band. They are known for their dynamic performances and deep lyrics, having released their first album in 2002.

== History ==
Bodyslam was originally called La - On (Lanna: ละอ่อน) which means kids or younger people, inspired by the name of freshman orientations at Suankularb Wittayalai School, the elementary school the band (the initial "La-on")'s members attended. In 1996, the band entered a band competition for high school students called 'Hot Wave Music Awards' and won the first prize, beating nearly a hundred other bands. La-on quickly signed a record deal with record company Music Bugs, and released a self-titled pop-rock album in 1997. "Dai Rue Plao" (ได้หรือเปล่า) became their most recognized song. The band members portrayed roles of themselves in the lakorn (Thai TV series) Thep Niyai Nai Sano (เทพนิยายนายเสนาะ) and later released the series' soundtrack in that same year.

The band returned in 2002 under the new name Bodyslam, shifting to heavier rock music with only three of the original six members remaining. The first self-titled album under their new name as a three-piece band was successful. The second album, Drive, was released in 2003, becoming equally successful as their previous album. They won Channel [V] Thailand Music Video Awards for "Favorite Group" for the music video Plai Thang (ปลายทาง: End of the road).

After the second album, the band went through many changes. They left Music Bugs and later signed a deal with Genie Records, a subsidiary of GMM Grammy, Thailand's largest record company. The band's guitarist Ratthapol "Pao" Pannachet left the band for a solo career (with an album in November 2005). Bodyslam then became a four-piece band. Bodyslam's long-time touring drummer, Chad, was finally announced as an official member and had appeared in music videos, posters, and album covers. The fourth member was Thanachai "Yod" Tantrakul, the new guitarist who was brought in to replace Ratthapol.

On 15 September 2007, Bodyslam released their fourth album Save My Life and a major concert in Bangkok followed in early October of that same year.

The success of the new album had brought them a bigger fan base. They became one of the most popular bands in Thailand. Save My Life won Season Awards for "Best Rock Group", "Best Rock Album" and "Best Rock Song" for "Yahpid" (ยาพิษ: Poison) in March 2008.

The single "Kraam" (คราม: Indigo) was released in November 2009 in which the fifth studio album with the same name (Kraam) was released in the spring of 2010 (After late to June 2010 with 2010 Thai political protests). They performed the largest concert in Thailand called Bodyslam Live in Kraam, at Rajamangala National Stadium on November 27, 2010 with an audience of 65,000 people. They finished their tour on April 7, 2011 with the Bodyslam Live in Laos: World Tour at New Laos National Stadium.

Their sixth album, "Dharmajāti" (meaning "nature" in Sanskrit), was released on September 25, 2014. Dharmajāti won "Best Album", the song "Chee-Wit Yung Kong Suay Ngarm" won "Best Recording" while the producer of the album, Poonsak Jaturaboon of Big Ass, won Producer of the Year in 26th Season Awards.

In May 2015 Bodyslam had a concert "100 Plus presents Bodyslam 13 years Concert". It was an anniversary concert that had many songs from every album. The concert for 13 years of Bodyslam. This concert had an audience of about 30,000 at Impact Arena Lakeside by Kala (group of producer). The concert had other singers, "Pu" Anchalee on the song "Ruk Yoo Kang Ter" (รักอยู่ข้างเธอ : Love Beside You) featuring Anchalee Jongkadeekij, Moderndog (music band), Labanoon on the song "Plid Plew" (ปลิดปลิว : Blown Away) featuring Methee Arun from Labanoon and the member from Big Ass, Siriporn Aumpripong on the song "Kit Hord" (คิดฮอด : Miss you) featuring Siriporn Ampaipong and "Goft" Fucking Hero - "Aui" Buddabas on song "Sticker", They showed a new song from the album "Dharmajāti" and famous songs from old albums, for example "Taang Kong Chun Fhun Kong Ter" (ทางของฉัน ฝันของเธอ : My path, your dream) from the album "Bodyslam", "Kwaam Sue-Sat" (ความซื่อสัตย์ : Honestly) from the album "Drive", "Korb Fah" (ขอบฟ้า Edge of the sky) from the album "Believe", "Yar Pid" (ยาพิษ Poison) from the album "Save My Life" and "Kraam" (คราม Indigo) from the album Kraam. The performance time was around 4 hours.

In 2015 Bodyslam was given the award, Seed award of the year (Rock) from Seed Radio, and they showed a concert with Carabao band (famous music band in Thailand). On 19 July 2015, Bodyslam released a new single "Wala Tao Nun" ( เวลาเท่านั้น Time Only) meaning "everything will have the answer by time".

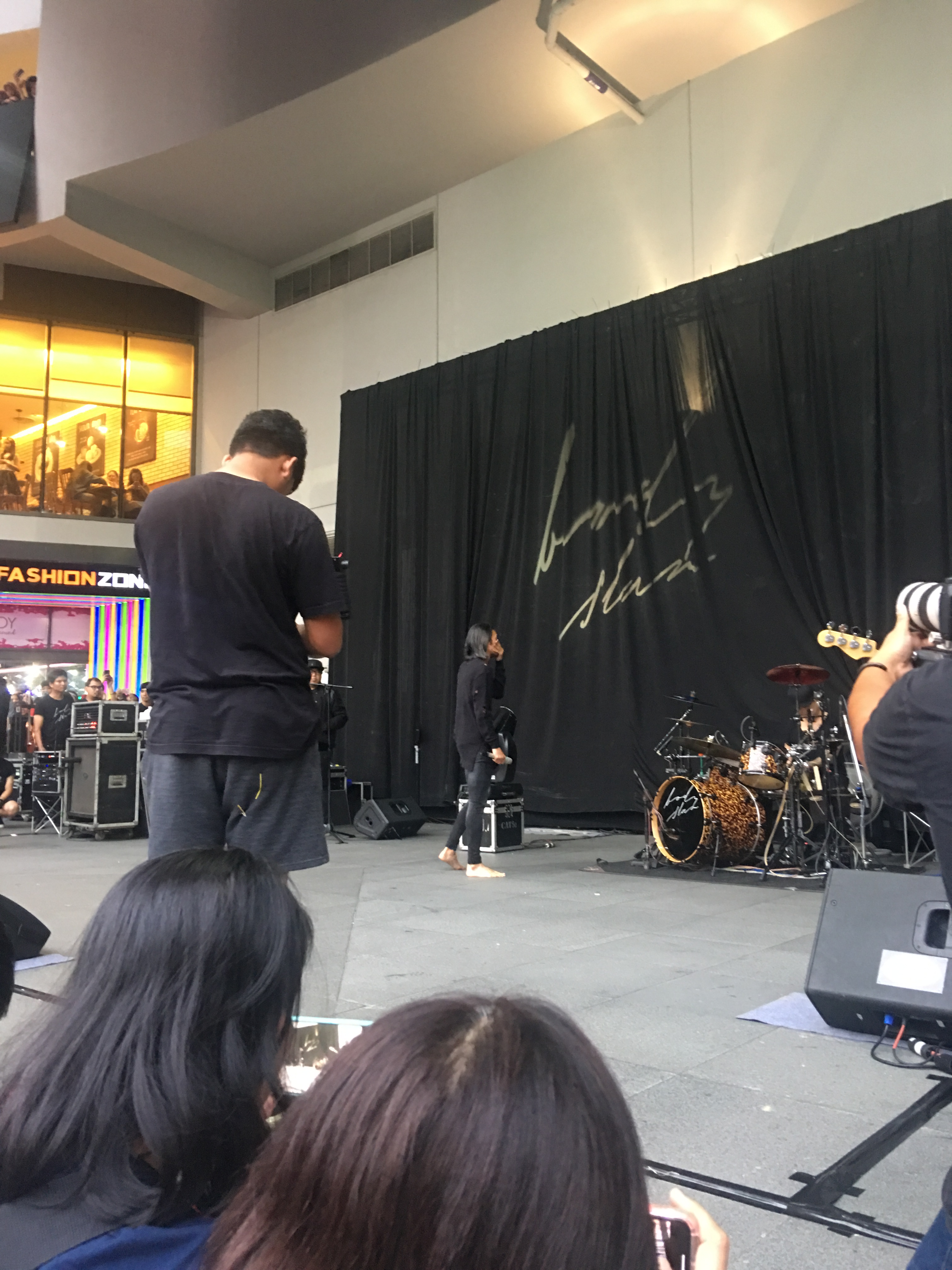
Bodyslam releasing 7th Album at Siam Square 1

In February 9–10 Bodyslam had a concert "M-150 Presents BODYSLAMFEST Wi-Cha Tua Bao Live In Rajamangala Stadium with an audience of 65,000 people. The concert had other singers, Palmy on the song "Ni-Ran" (นิรันดร์ : Eternal), Joey Boy on the song "Mai Kae Tai (ไม่แก่ตาย : Die Young) and "Kwarm Cheua" (ความเชื่อ : Belief) and F.Hero on the song "Phak Boong Loi Fah" (ผักบุ้งลอยฟ้า : Flying Morning Glory) and "dharmajāti" (ดัม-มะ-ชา-ติ : Nature). The concert lasted about 4 hours.

In March 2024, Bodyslam collaborated with Thai rapper F.Hero and Japanese kawaii metal band Babymetal to release a digital single "Leave It All Behind" which fuses rap, rock and metal in Thai and Japanese language.

On March 21, 2024, Bodyslam announced their upcoming concert called "EveryBodyslam2024 The Sunny Side Up Live At Impact Arena", which will be held for 2 days (June 22–23). And On April 1, Bodyslam announced that the concert will also be held on Friday. (June 21)

== Band members ==
Current

- Artiwara "Toon" Kongmalai (Thai: "ตูน" อาทิวราห์ คงมาลัย; RTGS: Athiwara Khongmalai) – lead vocals
- Thanachai "Yod" Tantrakul ("ยอด" ธนชัย ตันตระกูล; RTGS: Thanachai Tantrakun) – guitar (since Believe)
- Tanadol "Pid" Changsawek ("ปิ๊ด" ธนดล ช้างเสวก; RTGS: Thanadon Changsawek) – bass guitar
- Suchatti "Chad" Janed ("ชัช" สุชัฒติ จั่นอี๊ด; RTGS: Suchatti Chan-it) – drums (since Believe)
- Ohm "Ohm" Plengkhum ("เทพ" โอม เปล่งขำ; RTGS: Om Plengkham) – keyboards (since Kraam)

Past

- Ratthapol "Pao" Pannachet ("เภา" รัฐพล พรรณเชษฐ์; RTGS: Ratthaphon Phannachet) – guitar (First and second album)

== Discography ==
- Bodyslam (2002)
- Drive (2003)
- Believe (2005)
- Save My Life (2007)
- Kraam (2010)
- Dharmajāti (2014)
- Wi-Cha Tua Bao (2019)
- Sunny Side Up (2024)

=== Concerts ===
- 17 April 2004, Hotwave Live : Bodyslam Maximum Live Concert. At "Main Hall", Thammasat University.
- 14 May 2005, Bodyslam Believe Concert. At "Thunder Dome", Muang Thong Thani.
- 9 October 2005, Big Body Concert With Big Ass. At "Impact Arena", Muang Thong Thani.
- 20 – 21 October 2007, Bodyslam Save My Life Concert. At Indoor Stadium, Huamark.
- 5 July 2008, Every Bodyslam Concert. At Impact Arena, Muang Thong Thani
- 27 November 2010, Soda Chang present "Bodyslam Live in Kraam by Air Asia". At Rajamangala Stadium, Huamark.
- 10 – 12 February 2012, Bodyslam Nang Len (บอดี้สแลมนั่งเล่น). At "Impact Exhibition Hall 1", Muang Thong Thani.
- October 2014 - November 2014, Pra Got Garn Dharmajāti (ปรากฏการณ์ ดัม-มะ-ชา-ติ).
- 31 May 2015, Bodyslam 13. At "Impact Lakeside", Muang thong Thani.
- 1,2,7-9 October 2016, The Grandslam Live Bodyslam With The Orchestra at GMM Livehouse, CentralWorld
- 9–10 February 2019, BODYSLAM FEST Wi-Cha Tua Bao LIVE IN Rajamangala Stadium (Thai: BODYSLAM FEST วิชาตัวเบา LIVE IN ราชมังคลากีฬาสถาน) at Rajamangala Stadium
- 25–26 January 2020, BODYSLAM Nab 1 Teung 7 At Impact Arena, Muang Thong Thani (นับ 1 ถึง 7)
- 30 March- 2 April 2023, Bodyslam Pood Nai Jai the B-Side Concert at Aksara Theatre
- 21–23 June 2024, EVERYBODYSLAM2024 The Sunny Side Up Live At Impact Arena
- 4–6 April 2025, Bodyslam Power of The B-Side Concert A Dream and the Universe With The Orchestra at One Bangkok Forum
- 13–14 February 2026, BODYSLAM FEST Rak Kreung Neung Od Thon Kreung Neung LIVE IN Rajamangala Stadium (Thai: BODYSLAM FEST รักครึ่งนึง อดทนครึ่งนึง LIVE IN ราชมังคลากีฬาสถาน) at Rajamangala Stadium

== Songs ==
Bodyslam has released over 80 songs, with the album count at 8.

Album name	Release date	Songs
”Bodyslam"	9 July 2002	1. "Taang Kong Chun Fhun Kong Ter" (ทางของฉัน ฝันของเธอ My path, your dream); 2. "Ar-Kard" (อากาศ Air); 3. "Puer Wai" (เผื่อไว้ In case); 4. "Yok Tod" (ยกโทษ Forgive); 5. "Yum" (ย้ำ Repeat); 6. "Natee Soot Taai" (นาทีสุดท้าย The last minute); 7. "Pom Mai Soo" (ผมไม่สู้ I don't fight); 8. "Ngom Ngai" (งมงาย Obsessed); 9. "Suk Wun Chun Ja Dee Por" (สักวันฉันจะดีพอ One day I will be good enough); 10. "Muer Mai" (มือใหม่ Newbie); 11. "Away"; 12. "Parn Nee" (ป่านนี้ By now)
”Drive"	9 September 2003	1. "Hai Ruk Koom-Krong" (ให้รักคุ้มครอง May love protect us); 2. "Kwaam Sue-Sat" (ความซื่อสัตย์ Honestly); 3. "Chee-Wit Tee Chun Luer Yoo" (ชึวิตที่ฉันเหลืออยู่ The remaining life I have); 4. "Wun Wai" (หวั่นไหว Uneasy); 5. "Bodyslam"; 6. "Blai Taang" (ปลายทาง End of the path); 7. "Lhung Fon" (หลังฝน After the rain); 8. "Mee Kae Ter Kor Kern Por" (มีแค่เธอก็เกินพอ Having you is more than enough); 9. "Jun Yung Tem Duang" (จันทร์ยังเต็มดวง The moon is still full); 10. "Parb luang ta" (ภาพลวงตา Mirage; do not confuse with Endorphine's version)
"Believe"	22 April 2005	1. "Chee-Wit Bpen Kong Rao" (ชีวิตเป็นของเรา This is my life); 2. "Korb Fah" (ขอบฟ้า Horizon); 3. "Kon Tee Took Ruk" (คนที่ถูกรัก Person [who is] loved); 4. "Kwaam Ruk Tum Hai Kon Tar Bodd" (ความรักทำให้คนตาบอด Love is blind); 5. "Kwaam Cheua" (ความเชื่อ Belief) featuring Aed Carabao; 6. "Pood Nai Jai" (พูดในใจ Say it in your heart); 7. "Ruk Kor Bpen Yang Nee" (รักก็เป็นอย่างนี้ Love is like this); 8. "Harm Jai" (ห้ามใจ Restrain [the heart]); 9. "Mai Roo Meua Rai" (ไม่รู้เมื่อไหร่ Don't know when); 10. "Jeb Jon Wan Nee" (เจ็บจนวันนี้ It hurts up til now)
"Save My Life"	18 September 2007	1. "Yar Pid" (ยาพิษ Poison); 2. "Aok Huk" (อกหัก Broken Heart); 3. "Tarn Poo Chom" (ท่านผู้ชม Audience); 4. "Ying Roo Ying Mai Kao Jai" (ยิ่งรู้ยิ่งไม่เข้าใจ The more I know, the more I don't); 5. "Kae Lhub Tar" (แค่หลับตา Just close your eyes) featuring Panadda Ruangwut; 6. "Siew Winartee" (เสี้ยววินาที The split-second); 7. "Kon Mee Tung" (คนมีตังค์ Rich people); 8. "Saeng Raek" (แสงแรก The first light); 9. "Naa-Li-Gaa Dtaai" (นาฬิกาตาย A dead clock); 10. "Korb Kun Narm Tar" (ขอบคุณน้ำตา Thank you tears)
"Kraam"	9 June 2010	1. "Kraam" (คราม Indigo); 2. "Kwaam Ruk" (ความรัก Love); 3. "Sticker"; 4. "Kit Hord" (คิดฮอด Miss you) featuring Siriporn Ampaipong; 5. "Taang-Glap-Baan" (ทางกลับบ้าน The way home); 6. "Saeng Sut Taai" (แสงสุดท้าย Last light); 7. "Bploi" (ปล่อย Let it go) featuring Thanachai Ujjin from Modern Dog; 8. "Bpror Baang" (เปราะบาง Vulnerable); 9. "Tohn" (โทน Tone); 10. "Ngao" (เงา Shadows)
"Dharmajāti"	25 September 2014	1. "Tiam Tua Tai" (เตรียมตัวตาย Prepare to Die); 2. "Rua Lek Kuan Oak Jark Fhun" (เรือเล็กควรออกจากฝั่ง Little Boat Should Leave The Shore); 3. "Chee-Wit Yung Kong Suay Ngarm" (ชีวิตยังคงสวยงาม Life is still Beautiful); 4. "Plid Plew" (ปลิดปลิว Blown Away) featuring Methee Arun from Labanoon; 5. "dharmajāti" (Nature); 6. "Krueng Lhub Krueng Tuen" (ครึ่งหลับครึ่งตื่น Half-asleep); 7. "Kit Tueng" (คิดถึง Remembrance); 8. "Ruk Yoo Kang Ter" (รักอยู่ข้างเธอ Love Beside You) featuring Anchalee Jongkadeekij; 9. "Kwam Fhun Kub Jukkawal" (ความฝันกับจักรวาล Dream and Universe); 10. "Chang Mun Ter Ngao" (ช่างมันเถอะเหงา Lonely, Let it be)
"Wi-Cha Tua Bao"	31 January 2019	1. "Krai Kue Rao" (ใครคือเรา Who Are We); 2. "149.6"; 3. "Wi-Cha Tua Bao" (วิชาตัวเบา Levitate); 4. "Tis-sa-dee Vaccine" (ทฤษฎีวัคซีน Vaccine Theory); 5. "Ni-ran" (นิรันดร์ Eternal) featuring Palmy; 6. "Mai Kae Tai" (ไม่แก่ตาย Die Young) featuring Joey Boy; 7. "Klueng Klueng Klang Klabg" (ครึ่ง ๆ กลาง ๆ Half); 8. "Saeng Sa-wan" (แสงสวรรค์ Heaven Light); 9. "Chao Tee Duang Ta-wan Mai Koei Song Saeng" (เช้าที่ดวงตะวันไม่เคยส่องแสง The Dawn That The Sun Never Rises); 10. "Phak Boong Loi Fah" (ผักบุ้งลอยฟ้า Flying Morning Glory) featuring F.HERO; 11. "Kwam-mai" (ความหมาย Meaning)
"Sunny Side Up"	6 June 2024	1. "Wan Sin Pi" (วันสิ้นปี New Year's Eve); 2. "Sunny Side Up" featuring DABOYWAY; 3. "Heaw" (เหว Abyss); 4. "Tuer Keu Kwarm Sook* (เธอคือความสุข You Are Happiness); 5. "Pra-Got-Garn Pi-seua" (ปรากฏการณ์ผีเสื้อ Butterfly Phenomenon) featuring JOEY Phuwasit; 6. "Kleung-Lang" (ครึ่งหลัง Second Half); 7. "Peack-Pond" (เปียกปอน Soaking Wet); 8. "Plae-Pen" (แผลเป็น Scar) featuring Jeff Satur; 9. "Khow-Sung-Khom" (เข้าสังคม Socialize); 10. "Pid-Prub-Proong" (ปิดปรับปรุง Closed for Maintenance); 11. "Chan-Yak-Hen-Tuer-Yang-Yim-Dai-Yuu" (ฉันอยากเห็นเธอยังยิ้มได้อยู่ I Want To See You Still Smile)
