= Seksan Sukpimai =

Thai musician (born 1974)

Seksan Sukpimai เสกสรรค์ ศุขพิมาย
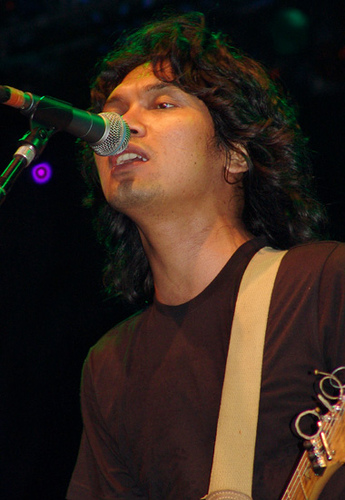
- Seksan in 2005

Background information
- Also known as: Sek Loso; P' Sek
- Born: Seksan Sukpimai; 7 August 1974 (age 52); Non Thai, Nakhon Ratchasima, Thailand
- Genres: Alternative rock; rock and roll; punk rock; hard rock; blues rock; heavy metal; grunge
- Occupations: Musician; singer-songwriter; streamer; film director; life coach
- Instruments: Guitar; bass; keyboard
- Years active: 1994–present
- Labels: GMM Grammy (1996–2011); More Music (1996-2003); Up^G (2009-2010); Yess Records (2010-2011, 2015); Loso Entertainment (2013–2014); Luster Entertainment (2019-present)
- Member of: Loso
- Incarcerated in prison since 21 May 2025

Seksan Sukpimai (Thai: เสกสรรค์ ศุขพิมาย; born 7 August 1974), also known by his stage name as Sek Loso (Thai: เสก โลโซ), is a Thai singer, songwriter and musician. He gained nationwide fame as the founder, lead vocalist, and lead guitarist of Loso, which became one of the most successful rock bands in Thai music history. Seksan's music bridges the gap between Western rock influences and Thai cultural sensibilities, making him a household name in Southeast Asia.

As of 2026, he is on parole. Earlier (2025), he started serving a 2-years 12-month and 20-day prison sentence.

Born and raised in Non Thai, Nakhon Ratchasima, Seksan discovered music at a young age and was inspired by international rock legends such as Guns N' Roses, the Beatles, and Jimi Hendrix. He formed Loso in the mid-1990s, and their debut album Lo Society (1996) was an instant success, blending raw rock energy with relatable lyrics that resonated with Thai youth. With chart-topping hits like "Mai Tong Huang Chan," "Jai Sang Ma," and "Som San", the band quickly rose to national fame. After several successful albums and nationwide tours, Seksan eventually embarked on a solo career in the early 2000s, releasing introspective and genre-defying albums that further solidified his status as a musical pioneer.

Despite his musical acclaim, Seksan has also faced controversies and personal struggles that attracted significant media attention. His open battles with mental health issues, legal troubles, and outspoken behavior have often polarized public opinion. Nevertheless, he remains an enduring figure in Thai pop culture and continues to perform, produce, and inspire new generations of artists. Seksan’s legacy is not just defined by his music but by his unfiltered authenticity and resilience in the face of fame and adversity.

== Biography ==
Seksan, the son of an itinerant rice-farming family, moved to Bangkok at age 12 and found work in a shop owned by an aunt, making jewelry. He also worked in a factory that made air conditioners. In 1991, inspired by his favorite artists, including Guns N' Roses and Carabao, he saved up enough to buy an inexpensive guitar, learned some chords and talked his way onto the stage at one of Bangkok's best-known live-music venues at the time, Austin Pub. Within a year, the 17-year-old singer-guitarist was leading the house band, playing covers of Thai rock, indie and pop, as well as Green Day, Nirvana, the Rolling Stones and Jimi Hendrix.

In 2016 he was convicted of assaulting an acquaintance; after being sentenced to a suspended prison sentence (two and a half years) and community service, he "called on youngsters and his fans to have self-restraint during any provocative event and be cautious when posting comments in the social media".

In 2016 Sukpimai's performance and the artists chosen to share with him were criticised in the Thai press; artist Moukdavanyh Santiphone is a country singer and critics argued she was the wrong choice to join the bill.

== Incident at Lincoln Center ==
Sek Loso performed in a rock opera adaptation of the Ramakien national epic on 28-30 July 2006 at the Lincoln Center for Performing Arts in New York. On stage, during the first night's performance, he struck Krissada Terrence (aka Noi Pru) on the head with a shoe during an altercation. The two musicians then grappled with each other and eventually took their fight off stage. A video of the altercation was shown on television in Thailand and was later posted to YouTube. Sek refused to return to the production and Loso rhythm guitarist Tom Loso replaced the frontman as Phra Rama for the remainder of the show.

In 2026, Sek was released from prison early.

== Discography ==
=== Loso ===
- Lo Society (1996)
- Lo Society Bonus Tracks (1996)
- Redbike Story (1997) (movie soundtrack)
- Entertainment (1998)
- Best of Loso (CD 1999)
- Rock & Roll (2000)
- Losoland (2001)
- The Red Album (August 2001)
- Best of Loso (Karaoke VCD, 2001)
- Loso Concert For Friends (VCD 2002)
- Loso Best Of Collection (30 April 2013)

=== Solo releases ===
- 7 August (April 2003)
- Sek Loso: The Collection (June 2005)
- Black & White (July 26, 2006)
- Sek - Album Sek Loso (May 28, 2009)
- Plus (22 June 2010)
- New (23 December 2010)
- I'm Back (17 October 2013)

== His backup band ==
Despite being a backup band for Sek's solo career, it still referred to as Loso according to Sek's official Facebook account.

- Seksan Sukpimai (Sek Loso) - Lead Vocal, Guitar
- Vorabut Tiaprasert (Tom Loso) - Guitar
- Suriyachai Thongnuch (Tom Syam) - Bass
- Phongsathon Rungrot (Bronzo Loso) - Drums
- Natthanat Hiransomboon (Teddy Eiffel) - Keyboard, Piano

=== Former Band Members ===
- Pradit Worasuttipisit (Dit Loso) - Bass
- Chris Borsberry (Chris Loso) - Guitar
- Paul Arthurs (Bonehead) - Guitar
- Eric Anthony Lavansch (Eric Loso) - Drums
- Anthony Wilson (Eddie Loso) - Bass
- Tortrakul Baingen (Tor Silly Fools) - Drums
- Thani Phromsri (Goy Loso) - Guitar
- Akkanat Wanchaitiwat (Zom Naka) - Drums
- Chaiwat Chaiwirat (Chay Loso) - Bass
