= Paper Planes (Thai band) =

Thai rock band

- Genre: Rock
- Years active: 2017–present
- Label: Genie Records
- Members: Tunwa Ketsuwan; Nakarin Khunpakdee
- Past members: Rittamnat Khwanthong; Keetames Sereedusitpat

Paper Planes (Thai: เปเปอร์เพลนส์) is a Thai rock band under Genie Records, a subsidiary of GMM Music. The band officially debuted in 2017 with their debut single Kon Sia Thoe Pai (Before Losing You) as part of the compilation album project Showroom Vol.3. The band currently operates as a duo, consisting of Tunwa Ketsuwan (Hye) on vocals and guitar, and Nakarin Khunpakdee (Zen) on bass.

Paper Planes rose to prominence in 2022 with their single Pretend (เสแสร้ง). Later that year, they achieved widespread commercial success with the release of Bad Boy (ทรงอย่างแบด). The single became a viral sensation, particularly among kindergarten and elementary school children. This unique and massive popularity led fans and the media to dub the duo the "Leaders of the Milk Tooth Gang" (หัวหน้าแก๊งวัยรุ่นฟันน้ำนม). In 2025, the band released 1% (One Percent), their first full-length studio album.

== History ==
=== 2017–2021: Formation and early years ===
Paper Planes originated in 2017 when its founding members began collaborating on music and releasing it online. The original lineup consisted of three members: Tunwa "Hye" Ketsuwan, Keetames Sereedusitpat "Yok" on guitar, and Rittamnat Khwanthong "Jazz" on drums. The band was subsequently selected to participate in Showroom Vol.3, a compilation project showcasing emerging artists under Genie Records. They made their official debut in late 2017 with their first single, "Kon Sia Thoe Pai" (Before Losing You).

Drummer Jazz subsequently departed from the band to form RELEASE, his own post-hardcore group. Despite his departure, he continues to serve as Paper Planes' touring drummer for live performances to this day. Around the release of their second single, "Sam Sam" (ซ้ำซ้ำ), Nakarin "Zen" Khunpakdee officially joined the band as their bassist. In 2019, the band released their debut extended play (EP) titled HERS, which heavily featured alternative rock and post-hardcore elements. Following the EP, they released a string of consecutive singles, including "Kep Chan Wai Thammai," "Kulap Phit," and "Kam Mat." These releases marked a shift in their musical style, as they began incorporating emo trap influences into their work.

=== 2022–present: Breakthrough success and debut studio album ===
In 2022, Paper Planes gained widespread recognition following the release of their single "Pretend" (เสแสร้ง) featuring MOON. Fusing pop-punk and emo-trap elements, the song topped the JOOX music charts and surpassed 100 million views on YouTube. Following the track's success, guitarist Yok announced his departure from the band in late 2022 to focus on his family and personal business ventures. This transition led the band to reform as a duo. Since then, Hye and Zen have remained the core members of the lineup up to the present.

In late 2022, the band released the single "Bad Boy" (ทรงอย่างแบด), which achieved massive popularity and became a viral sensation among kindergarten and elementary school children. This widespread acclaim earned them the moniker "Leaders of the Milk Tooth Gang" (หัวหน้าแก๊งวัยรุ่นฟันน้ำนม) from both the media and listeners. The surge in their popularity subsequently resulted in a significant increase in concert bookings and special events catering to younger audiences. In 2025, Paper Planes officially announced the release of 1% (One Percent), their debut full-length studio album, featuring a total of 21 tracks.
