= Paradox (Thai band) =

Thai rock band

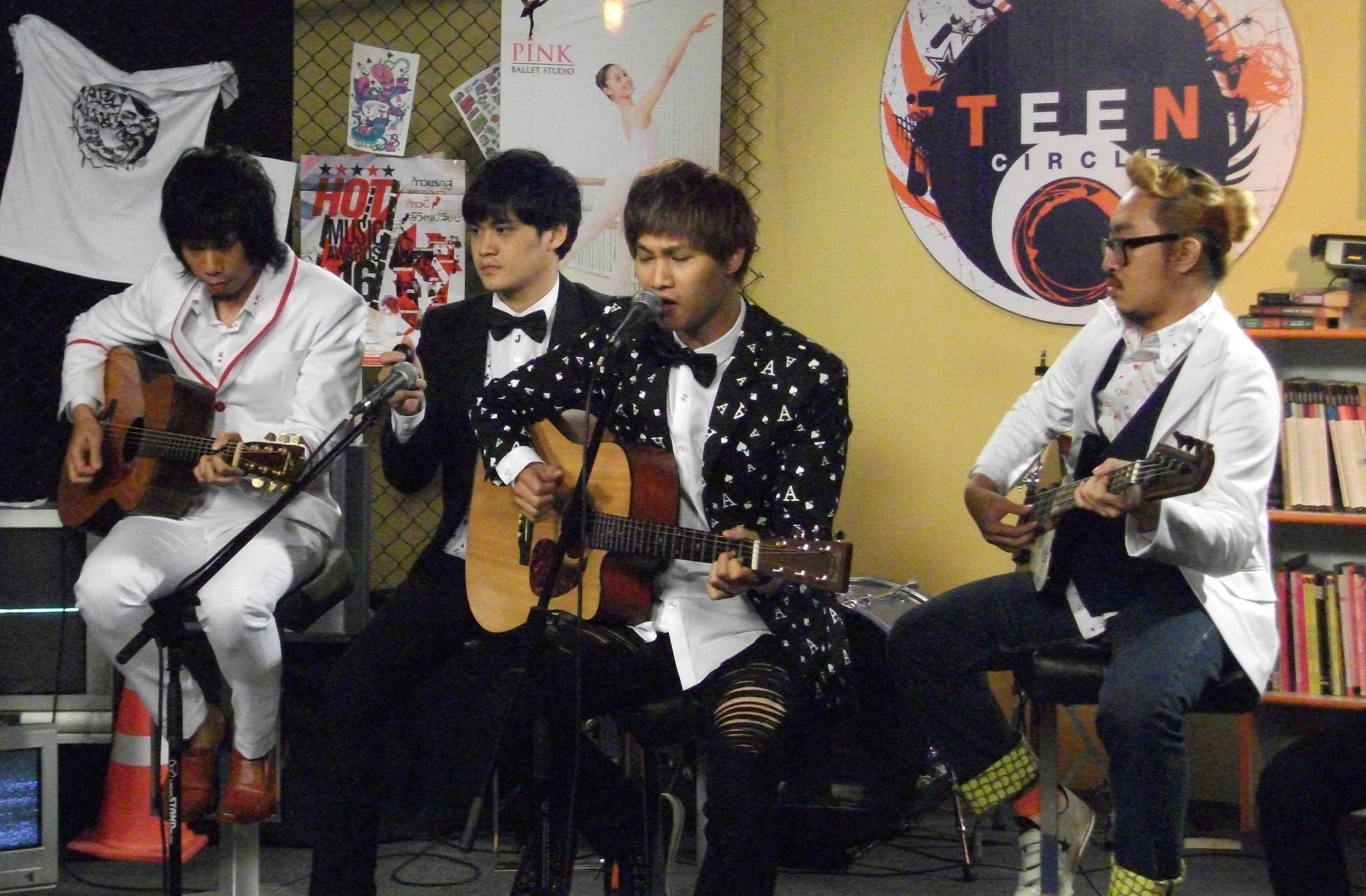
- Paradox at Teen Circle, VERY TV (2011)

Background information
- Origin: Thailand
- Genres: Alternative rock, indie rock
- Years active: 1996–present
- Label: genie records · GMM Music
- Members: Ittipong Kridakorn Na Ayudhaya; Chakrapong Siririn; Kajadphai Karnchanapar; Saittaporn Kridakorn Na Ayadhaya; Charnnarong Wangyen; Nattha Kamolrattanakul
- Past members: Porapat Cheeweewat

Paradox is a Thai rock band founded in 1996 while they were studying in Faculty of Education, Chulalongkorn University. They are famous as a unique live band in Thailand.

== Members ==
- Ittipong Kridakorn Na Ayudhaya (อิทธิพงศ์ กฤดากร ณ อยุธยา) (Tar) Vocal/Guitarist
- Chakrapong Siririn (จักรพงษ์ สิริริน) (Song) Bassist
- Kajadphai Karnchanapar (ขจัดภัย กาญจนาภา) (Big) Guitarist
- Saittaporn Kridakorn Na Ayadhaya (เสรฐพร กฤดากร ณ อยุธยา) (Joey) Drummer
- Charnnarong Wangyen (ชาญณรงค์ วังเย็น) (Off) Screamer
- Nattha Kamolrattanakul (นัทธา กมลรัตนกุล) (Keng) Joker

== Past member ==
- Porapat Cheeweewat (พรภัฏ ชีวีวัฒน์) (Note) Drummer

== History ==
=== Former Period ===
In computer class, Ittipong Kridakorn Na Ayudhaya or Ta (อิทธิพงศ์ กฤดากร ณ อยุธยา), a student from Faculty of Education, Chulalongkorn University, who wanted to join university activities as a freshman by having band asked Chakrapong Siririn (จักรพงษ์ สิริริน) or Song, from the same faculty, to join him as a bassist. Both were influenced by Modern Dog, one of the leading Thai alternative bands at the time. They attended a Modern Dog concert held at the Faculty of Communication arts and met the band's first drummer Porapat Cheeweewat (พรภัฏ ชีวีวัฒน์) or Note.

Initially, they used "หอยจ๊อ" Hoy Jor, which translates to "crab rolls", as their band name and sent their demo to Easternsky Records, an independent record label. In only one day, their demo was accepted on condition that they change their band name for commercial purposes, hence the change to 'Paradox'.

=== Lunatic Planet ===
With their unique musical sound, their first album "Lunatic Planet", which was released in 1996, became so famous among indie music listeners. At that time, Note had introduced Kajadphai Karnchanapar (ขจัดภัย กาญจนาภา), also known as Big, to become another member as a guitarist.

After Easternsky Records had closed down, Note had moved to USA after his marriage and work, Paradox eventually went on hiatus for a year. They recorded their first indie album, แมลงวันสเปน Ma Leang Wan Spain (Spanish Fly), in limited 1,000 cassettes sold in the university using Tata Records, founded by Ta, as a record label. Paradox & My Friends, another indie album which included other associated bands' works on the cassette's B-side. All the recorded works from the indie albums were recorded in Ta's bedroom.

=== Another Big Step ===
Pretty soon, they had another chance to work for the "ท่ามกลาง" Tam Glang (Among) project "Intro 2000", a various artists album from Genie Records which is a branch of GMM Grammy, the largest record label and entertainment company in Thailand. They were asked to sign with Genie Records afterwards.

Since they did not have enough members to perform in the band, Ta had invited Saittaporn Kridakorn Na Ayadhaya (เสรฐพร กฤดากร ณ อยุธยา) or Joey, his relative who was also their temporary drummer, to officially become their full-time drummer. Ta had also invited Charnnarong Wangyen (ชาญณรงค์ วังเย็น) (Off) to be a screamer and the last one Nattha Kamolrattanakul (นัทธา กมลรัตนกุล) or Keng to be a Joker, both of whom would become regular entertainers in live performances by Paradox.

=== Summer ===
During 2000, their 2nd album, titled "Summer", was released. Paradox became famous by their unique style of music, an example being their song น้องเปิ้ล Nong Ple. Their debut song, ร.ด. Dance Ror Dor Dance (Military Dance) or ฤดูร้อน Ru Du Ron (Summer) would be big hits for the band.

Paradox decided to break away from the indie world by releasing " แค้นผีนรก Khean Phee Na Rok (Hell Ghost Revenge) in 2000, after Summer had been released.

Following their success with "Summer", "On The Beach", a special album was released. This album contained acoustic versions of the songs from both Lunatic Planet and Summer and 2 new special tracks, ดาว Dao (Stars) สงสัย Song Sai (Curiosity), which also became one of their famous hit songs, especially ดาว Dao (Stars) which had been covered by many artists from time to time.

Two years later, their 3rd album, "On The Rainbow", was released. This marked a change in Paradox's style as the band used a softer sound and more beautiful melodies, seen in songs such as รุ้ง Rung (Rainbow) and เศษ Set (Pieces), a power ballad, or ไฟ Fai (Fire), a fast-paced song. Unfortunately, this album did not garner as much success as the previous album "Summer".

=== First Concert ===
Paradox had become one of the leading rock bands in Thailand, hosting their own first concert in 2003 by Fat Radio named Fat Live 4 : The Paradox Circus, the official full name of the concert. This concert was held at the Indoor Stadium Huamark on 26 March 2003. They also used this concert to promote their next album named "Free Style" by performing the first promotional single from this album "Sexy".

Their 4th album Free Style also included a reworked version of นักมายากล Nak Ma Ya Kol (The Magician), one of the hit songs from their 1st album Lunatic Planet.

In that same year, Paradox joined the Little Rock Project, a special music project with other bands from the same record label, for instance Clash, ABNormal, Kala, to cover songs from Micro, a legendary Thai rock band, in "Rock Size S Concert in Freedom Sunday" at Impact Arena Mueang Thong Thani.

== Discography ==
=== Albums ===
==== Studio albums ====
- 1996 : Lunatic Planet
- 2000 : Summer
- 2002 : On The Rainbow
- 2003 : Free Style
- 2006 : X (Ten Years After)
- 2011 : Daydreamer
- 2017 : Before Sunrise After Sunset
- 2025 : ETERNITY / INFINITY

==== Independent albums ====
- 1997 : แมลงวันสเปน Ma Leang Wan Spain (Spanish Fly)
- 1998 : PARADOX & My Friends
- 2000 : แค้นผีนรก Khean Phee Na Rok (Hell Ghost Revenge)

=== Singles ===
- 1996 : นักมายากล Nak Mayakoln (Magician)
- 1996 : เพ้อ Puer
- 2000 : ท่ามกลาง Tam Glang (Middle Ground)
- 2000 : น้องเปิ้ล Nong Plen (Junior Plen)
- 2000 : Love
- 2002 : รุ้ง Rung (Rainbow)
- 2002 : กลิ่นโรงพยาบาล
- 2009 : กอดฉันไว้ Kod Chan Wai (Hug Me)
- 2012 : ไอศกรีม (Concert Version) (Ice Cream)
- 2014 : พรุ่งนี้ Prung Ni (Tomorrow)
- 2014 : รถไฟขบวนแห่งความฝัน Rod Fai Kabuan Haeng Kwam Faan (Dream Train)
- 2014 : รักเธอเท่าช้าง Rak Tuea Tao Chaang (I Love You As Much As An Elephant)
- 2014 : ลอง Long (Try)
- 2016 : ฤดูฝน Reu Du Fon (Rainy Season)
- 2018 : เขียนไว้ข้างเตียง Kean Wai Kaang Teang (Written Next To Your Bed)
- 2019 : ห้องดับจิต Hoang Dab Chit (Mortuary)
- 2020 : Message of The Cat
- 2021 : ลาออก La Ouk (Drop Out)
- 2023 : เอาแต่ใจ Aoa Tae Jai (Selfish)
- 2023 : เลขเด็ด Laek Ded (Lucky Number)
- 2023 : ฤดูหนาว Reu Du Naew (Winter)
- 2023 : ฤดูเซฟ Reu Du Save (Saving Season)
- 2024 : พูดอีกที Pood Eik Te (Say It Again)
- 2024 : เอ็นดู En Du (Jealous)
- 2025 : 8 นาฬิกา 8 Nalika (8 O'Clock)
- 2025 : คิดถึง…ไม่ไหว ‘‘Kid Thueng…Mai Wai’’ (Thinking About You...Is Too Much)

==== Live album ====
- 2003 : Fat Live 4 : The Paradox Circus
- 2025 : ผงาดง้ำค้ำโลกชวนโดดไม่รู้ล้ม

==== Compilation Albums ====
- 2004 : Hit Me
- 2012 : The Journey Of Paradox
- 2009 : PARADOX PARADE
- 2017 : PARADOX X (20 years after)

==== Special albums ====
- 2001 : On The Beach
- 2007 : Paradox In Paradise

=== Home videos ===
- 2003 : Pattaya Music Festival2003 Vol. 4
- 2003 : Fat Live 4 : The Paradox Circus
- 2004 : Rock Size S Concert in Freedom Sunday

=== Books ===
- 2007 : บันทึกลึกลับ Paradox X Ban Teuk Leuk Lab Paradox X(Mystery Note of Paradox X)

== Awards ==
- 2004 Best Hit Music of the year, FAT AWARD#2 - ขอ Khor from Free Style
- 2004 Best Hook of the year, FAT AWARD#2 - ขอ Khor from Free Style
- 2007 Best Artist of the year, FAT AWARD#5
