= WerkGang =

Thai record label

- Parent company: GMM Music
- Genre: Pop; Rock
- Country of origin: Thailand

WerkGang (Thai: เวิร์คแก๊งค์) is a Thai record label and a subsidiary of GMM Grammy that produces music on various music genres such as pop and rock. Its current managing director is Kritsana Warin.

== Roster ==
=== Current acts ===
- MR.Lazy
- NOS
- SPF
- HOBBIT
- PANCAKE
- SALEE
- CHASE
- BEAT BOYZ
- D DAY
- FULL
- MINOR THIRD
- COOKIE CUTTER
