= Potato (band) =

Thai rock band

Potato (โปเตโต้)
- Origin: Chiang Mai, Thailand
- Genres: Rock; Thai rock; alternative rock; pop rock; acoustic rock
- Years active: 2001–present
- Label: genie records · GMM Music
- Members: Patchai Pukdesusook; Kan Uamsupan; Piyawat Anukul; Teekatas Taviarayakul; Kiattiyos Malathong
- Past members: Peechanit Oan-Aari; Rattanapon Keng-Rean; Nantakrai Cham-Jaiharn; Oranuch Tangdechavut; Suwatin Watthanawitukun

Potato (Thai: โปเตโต้) is a Thai rock band founded in 2001. They released their first album the same year and are known for their versatile music style and lyrics. The band currently has five members including lead vocalist Patchai Pukdesusook, guitarist Teekatas Taviarayakul, bassist Piyawat Anukul, drummer Kan Uamsupan, and keyboardist Kiattiyos Malathong. They've released 9 studio albums, one extended play, and several compilation albums and is considered one of the most successful Thai rock bands.

== History ==
Potato was formed by Peechanit Oan-Aari (Pee), Nantakrai Cham-Jaiharn (Note), Oranuch Tangdechavut (Nuch), and Suwatin Watthanawitukun (Bom). Potato's original vocalist was Peechanit Oan-Aari (Pee), but he died on 3 October 2002, leading to the band's dissolution. However, the band reunited in 2003. In 2008, Potato announced a new drummer named Kan Uamsupan (Kan), replacing Suwatin Watthanawitukun (Bom), who left the group after recording the "Sense" album. He still makes occasional appearances with the band. Potato's lineup then included Patchai "Pup" Pukdesusook (vocals), Piyawat "Ohm" Anukul (bass), and Kan Uamsupan (drums). The band's last guitarist, Rattanapon "Win" Keng-Rean, left Potato in 2010 and a number of guitarists from other bands have substituted for him since. In 2013, Teekatas "Hang" Taviarayakul joined the band as the group's latest guitarist.

== Band members ==
Current

- Patchai "Pup" Pukdesusook – vocals (2001–present)
- Piyawat "Ome" Anukul – bass (2003–present)
- Kan Uamsupan – drums (2008–present)
- Teekatas "Hung" Taviarayakul – guitar (2013–present)
- Kiattiyos "Aum" Malathong – keyboard (2013–present)

Past

- Rattanapon "Win" Keng-Rean – guitar (2003–2010)
- Suwatin "Bom" Watthanawitukun – drums (2001–2007)
- Nantakrai "Note" Cham-Jaiharn – guitar (2001–2004)
- Oranuch "Nuch" Tangdechavut – bass (2001–2002)
- Peechanit "Pee" Oan-Aaree – vocals (2001–2002)

== Discography ==
Studio albums

- Potato (2001)
- Go...On (2003)
- Life (2005)
- Sense (2007)
- Circle (2008)
- Human (2011)
- CHUDTEEJED (2019)
- Friends (2021)
- Dot (2026)

EPs

- ตอนเย็น (Thon-yen) (2013)

Compilations

- Focus' (2004)
- Collection (2006)
- Refresh (2008)

== Awards ==
- Seed Awards 2005
  - Seed Popular Song of The Year for Ruk tae doo lae mai dai
  - Seed Album Of The Year for Life
- Top Awards 2005
  - Best Group Artist
- Gmember Award 2009
  - Best Group Artist of The Year
- Sudsapda Yang&Smart 2009
  - Popular Best Group Artist
- Gmember Award 2011
  - Popular Rock Artist
  - Popular Song for Mai roo ja ar ti bai yang ngai
  - Popular Music Video for Mai roo ja ar ti bai yang ngai
