= Big Ass =

Thai rock band

Big Ass (บิ๊กแอส)
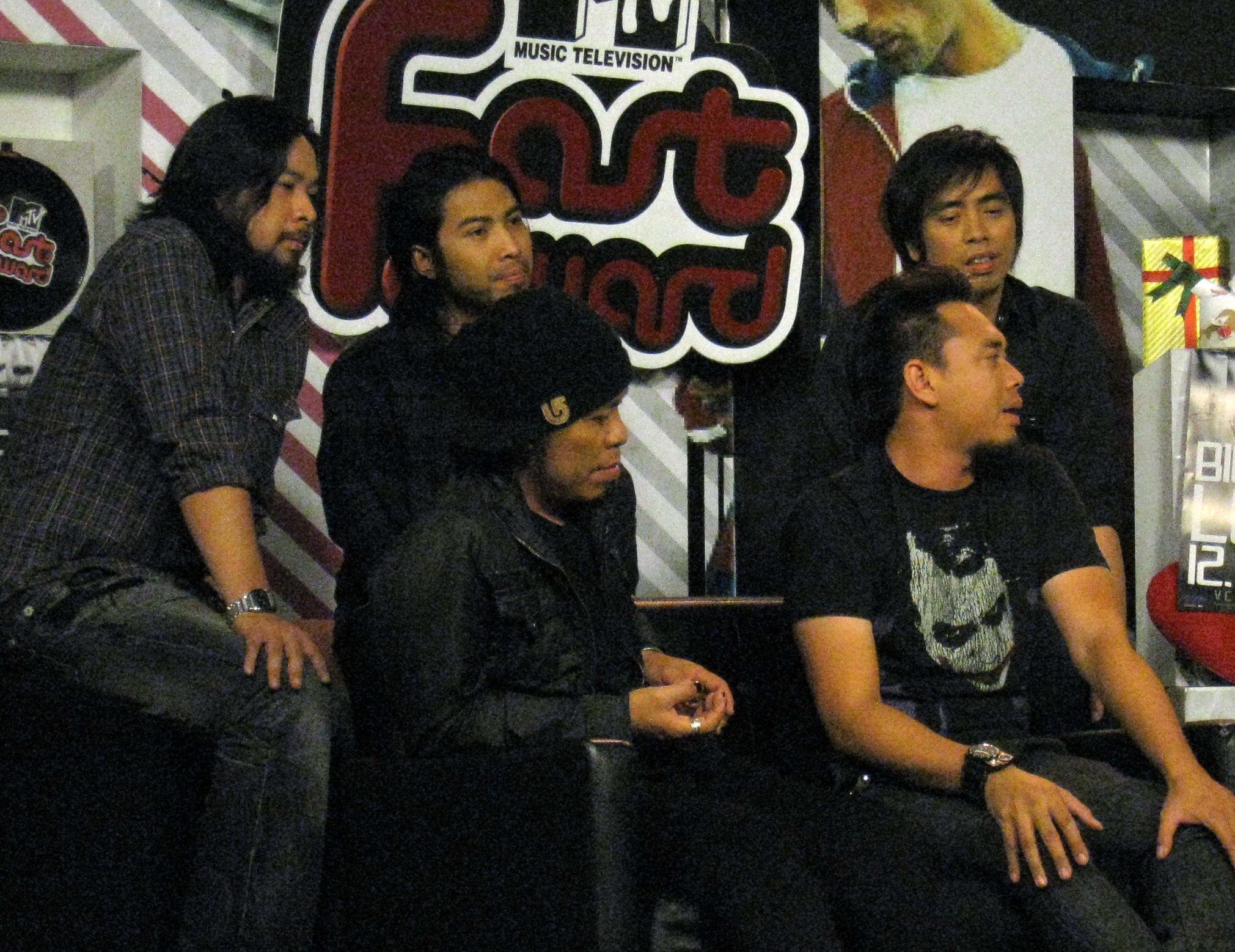
- Big Ass in 2009; L-R: Off, Oak, Dax, Kob, Moo

Background information
- Origin: Bangkok, Thailand
- Genres: Metalcore; Nu metal Pop rock (early works)
- Years active: 1996–present
- Labels: Music Bugs (1997–2003) genie records (2004–present)
- Members: Daycha Konarlo; Poonsak Jaturaboon; Apichart Promraksa; Pongpan Pollasit; Kachorndej Promraksa

Big Ass is a Thai rock band. It was originally a pop rock band but the music moved toward hardcore punk in some of the band's recent works. During the band's early years until mid-2012, the band's leading vocalist was Ekkarat "Dax" (or "Dak") Wongchalard. Later half of 2012, Daycha "Jeng" Konarlo became the new leading vocalist, replacing Ekkarat in EP Dan Neramit, their seventh album released in April 2013. Their latest album is The Lion, the eighth album released in 2017.

== History ==
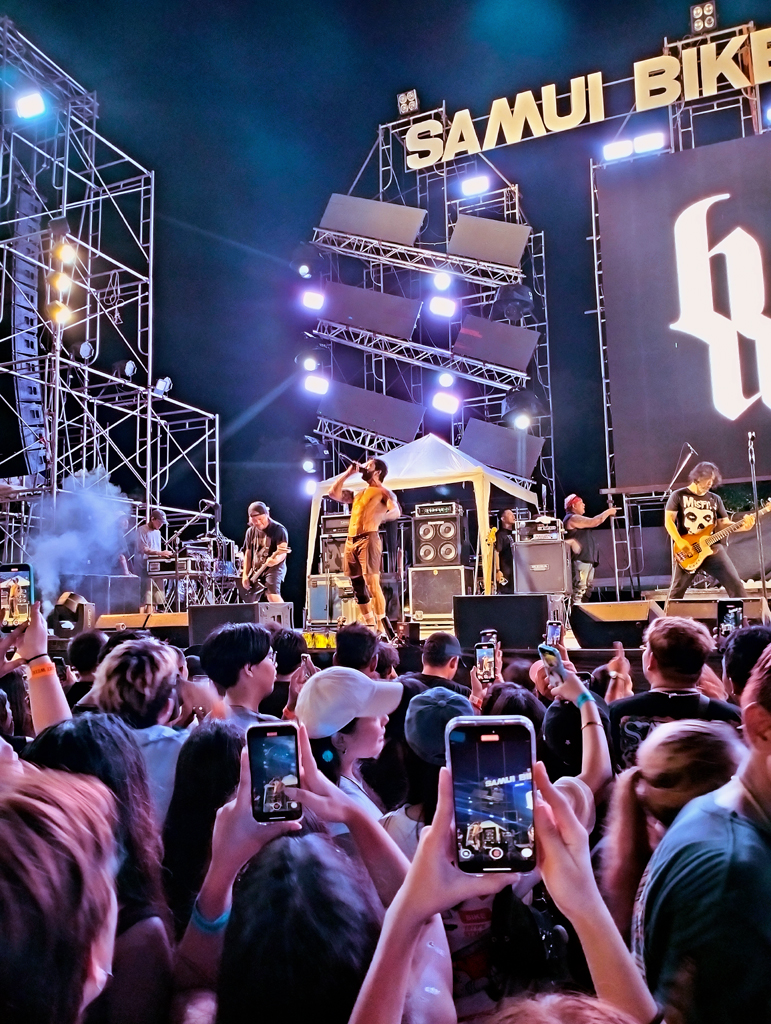
Big Ass 2025 at Samui Bike Week.

Big Ass released their first album Not Bad in 1997 on the Music Bugs label. Their second and third albums, XL and My World, followed in 2000 and 2003. Big Ass won numerous awards for their work but attracted a rather limited audience during their first three albums. Only 10,000 cassettes were sold for their first album while 22,000 cassettes were sold for the second album. It left Music Bugs to join the Genie Records label of GMM Grammy. Their fourth album Seven (signifying seven years in the music scene) was very successful in terms of awards and popularity. The album was recognized by both major music awards in Thailand: Season Awards, and Fat Awards (see Awards section below). Popularity-wise, they were also voted the most popular artist by fellow artists in Fat Awards No. 3 and nominated for the most popular group in 4th Channel [V] Thailand Music Video Awards. Their fifth full album was Begins with hit songs such as "Kha Noi Somkhuan Tai" and "Prom Li-Kit".

Besides their studio albums, Big Ass has a song in the special album Wan Fa Mai (วันฟ้าใหม่) celebrating New Year released around the end of 2005. The song "Rao" (เรา) on the album was performed by Big Ass together with Bodyslam.

In 2008 an original soundtrack for Thai movie Pid Term yai Hua Jai Wawun (ปิดเทอมใหญ่ หัวใจว้าวุ่น, also known as Hormones) featured Big Ass. The band also appeared in the film as themselves playing the song "Kon Tai" (ก่อนตาย) in a pub.

In 2011 the band's guitarist-backing vocalist Poonsak Jaturaboon sang in the original soundtrack Tum Yu Nai Jai (ทุ้มอยู่ในใจ) for the film SuckSeed. Ekarat Wongchalard also appeared as himself in the movie.

In July 2012 the band revealed on Facebook that the long-time leading vocalist Ekarat Wongchalard would leave the band due to his music work reaching saturation. Daycha Konarlo appeared as the band's new leading vocalist on their single "Dan Neramit" (แดนเนรมิต), which was released in August 2012. The second single "Thao Thi Mi" (เท่าที่มี) was released in October 2012. The singles were made available through iTunes. The EP Dan Neramit was released in April 2013. Ekarat later joined Rock Rider team producing TV shows about rock music and travel on big bike. Ekarat released a solo Khon Tai Thi Hai Jai (คนตายที่หายใจ) with Rock Rider (consisting of Dak, Silly Fools, Airborne) in 2014.

In 2014 Big Ass performed an original soundtrack Ab Nam Ron (อาบน้ำร้อน) for the TV series Hormones the Series (season 2).

In 2017 they released the album The Lion.

Their latest album Lai Nio Mue (ลายนิ้วมือ) was released in 2022, celebrating their 25 years in music.

== Origins of the name ==
Student Weekly: The name of your band is a bit naughty. How did you come up with the name Big Ass?

Dax: Actually when we were students we used so many different names to book studio time that the owner would get confused if we were the same band. So we wanted to find a unique name to represent our band. When we looked around, the first thing that caught our attention was an ass. It seemed firm and sturdy just like rock music, the music we like. And we didn't want just a normal ass, so we named the band Big Ass.

== Members ==
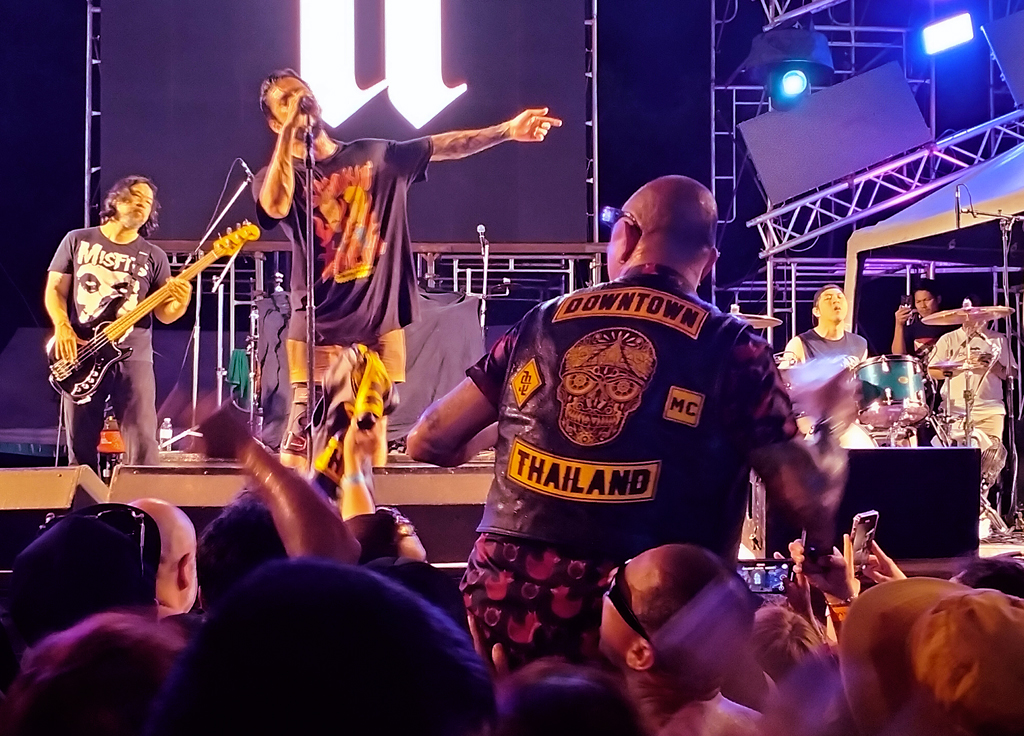
Big Ass 2025 at Samui Bike Week.

The Thai names and nicknames are given in parentheses.

- Daycha Konarlo (เดชา โคนาโล; Jeng, เจ๋ง): lead vocals (2012–present)
- Poonsak Jaturaboon (พูนศักดิ์ จตุระบุล; Off, อ็อฟ): guitar, backing vocals
- Apichart Promraksa (อภิชาติ พรมรักษา; Moo, หมู): guitar, backing vocals
- Pongpan Pollasit (พงษ์พันธ์ พลสิทธิ์; Oak, โอ๊ก): bass guitar, backing vocals 2001–present)
- Kachorndej Promraksa (ขจรเดช พรมรักษา; Kob, กบ): drums

=== Past members ===
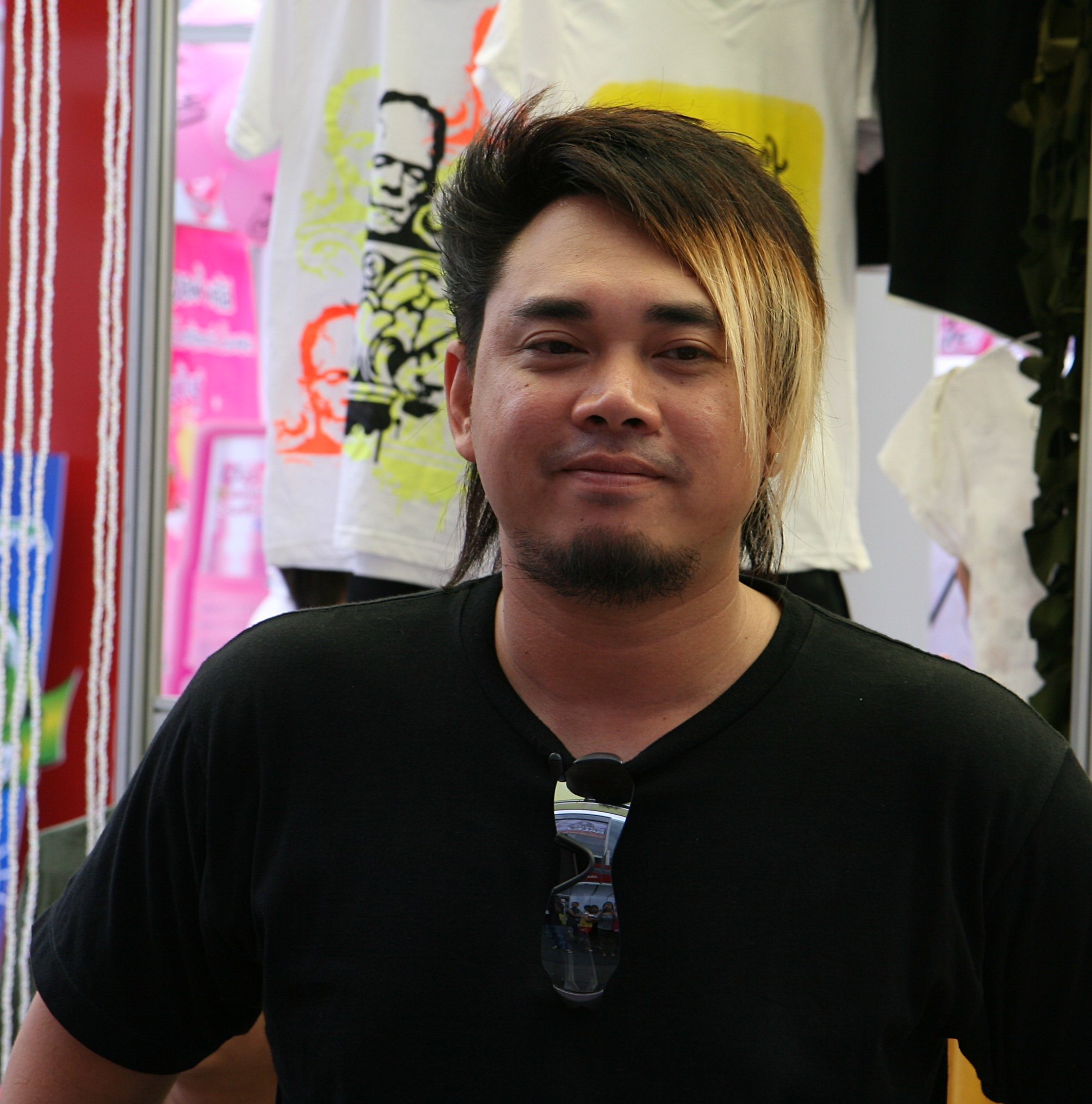
Ekarat "Dak" Wongcharat, former lead vocals.

- Ekkarat Wongchalard (เอกรัตน์ วงศ์ฉลาด; Dax, แด๊กซ์): lead vocals (1996–2012)
- Ekarat Rattanapinta (เอกรัตน์ รัตนปิณฑะ; Ton, ต้น): Bass guitar (1996–2003)

== Discography ==
- Not Bad (1997)
- XL (2000)
- My World (2003)
- Seven (July 2004)
- Begins (November 2006)
- Love (12 December 2008)
- EP Dan Neramit (2013)
- The Lion (2017)
- Lai Nio Mue (2022)

== Awards ==
- Best new artist for album Not Bad, 10th Season Awards (สีสัน อะวอร์ดส์), 1998
- Best rock duo or band, best rock album for My World, and best rock song Che Wit Lang Khwam Tai (ชีวิตหลังความตาย), 16th Season Awards, March 2004
- Duo or group artist of the year for My World, Fat Awards No. 2, April 2004
- Best rock group and best rock album for Seven, 17th Season Awards, March 2005
- Song of the year for Len Khong Soong (album Seven), and most popular artist voted by other artists, Fat Awards No. 3, April 2005
- Best rock group, best rock album for Begins, and best rock song for Begins, 19th Season Awards, March 2007
- Most Popular Band, Siamdara Stars Awards 2013
- Song of the year for Lom Plean Tid (album EP Dan Neramit), Nine Entertain Awards 2014
- Album of the year for The Lion, Band Artist of the Year, and Guitar Man of the Year, Guitar Mag Awards 2018

== In the news ==
Ekarat Wongcharat, the leading vocal of Big Ass, made the headlines when a 17-year-old men's magazine model nicknamed "Fai" appeared with her baby "Justin" and claimed that Wongcharat was the baby's father in February 2006. Allegedly they had sex when Fai was 16 years old, meaning that Wongcharat would be a child sex offender if the accusation was true. Wongcharat was subsequently arrested and released on bail on 27 February. While Wongcharat gave his blood sample for DNA testing in March, Fai and Justin did not give theirs until early May. On 10 May 2006 police announced that the result was negative. A retest performed by Khunying Pornthip Rojanasunand drew the same conclusion. Even through he is not the child's father, the trial for the underage sex offense remained. The trial began on 13 February 2007 and the court decision was announced on 21 March 2007. He received two years of a suspended sentence and must produce two anti-drug songs as pledged by the singer in exchange for a light sentence.

== In popular culture ==
Konarlo is sometimes known by the alias Leonidas because of his resemblance to the character from 300.

== See also ==
- Thai rock
- String (Thai pop)
