= Silly Fools =

Thai rock band

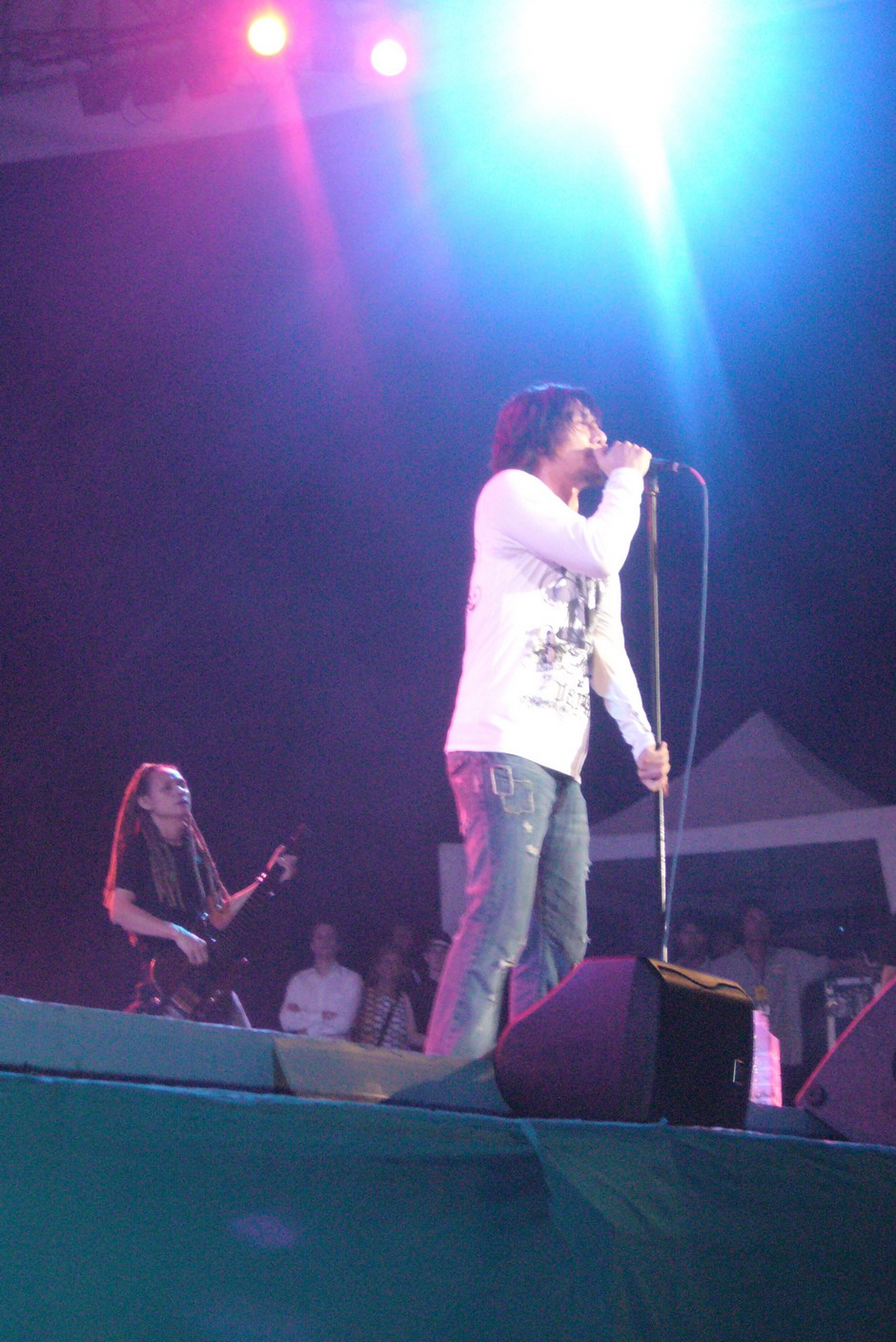
- Silly Fools (Thai Band) in Pattaya Music Festival, Thailand

Background information
- Origin: Bangkok, Thailand
- Genres: Alternative rock; Post-grunge; Nu metal; Progressive metal; Alternative metal; Pop-rock
- Years active: 1996-present
- Labels: Bakery Music (1996); More Music (1998-2006); Sanamluang Music (2007-2008); RS Music-x (2008-2011); Warner Music (2013-2015); Me Records (2015-present)
- Members: Jakarin Juprasert (Ton); Thewarit Srisuk (Rang); Tortrakul Baingern (Tor); Krishna Pandonlan (Rim)
- Past members: Korbphob Baiyame (Toey); Natapol Puthpawana (Toe); Ratn Kobayashi (Rat); Benjamin Jung Tuffnell (Ben)

Silly Fools is a Thai rock band. They released their first album in 1998 and are known for their alternative rock sound.

The group first formed in 1996, and in same year, released an EP named Sampler on the independent label Bakery Music. The band then moved to More Music and released their first full-length album, I.Q. 180, but attracted a small audience compared with that of labelmates Loso.

Silly Fools popularity increased as the musical style of their later albums was more accessible to the public. They are now considered among the top rock bands in Thailand.

Silly Fools was the winner of the favorite artist for Thailand at the 2005 MTV Asia Awards.

== History ==
=== Overview ===
Silly Fools is a Thai rock band. Their music can be described as modern rock. The group first formed in 1995, and in 1996, released an EP named Sampler on the independent label Bakery Music.

The band then moved to More Music and released their first full-length album, I.Q. 180, but attracted a small audience compared with that of labelmates Loso. Silly Fools popularity increased as the musical style of their later albums was more accessible to the public. They are now considered among the top rock bands in Thailand. Silly Fools was the winner of the favorite artist for Thailand at the 2005 MTV Asia Awards.

=== Formation (1996) ===
Silly Fools original name was Silly Foolish which was founded by Songpol Juprasert (Jakrin Juprasert), Korbphob Baiyame, Natapol Puthpawana and Thewarit Srisuk in 1996. They submitted a demo to Bakery Music in which they made an EP Album project named Bakery Sampler with two other bands named Wiset Niyom and Stone Soul. This project was just a sample album. If the album sold up to 20,000 copies then Silly Foolish would be able to join the musical company. They then changed their name to Silly Fools because they said their name was too long.

=== 1998–2006 Album I.Q. 180 - King Size ===
After their first unsuccessful EP, Silly Fools had to separate for 1 year to perform normal occupations.

In 1998, Pom - Assanee Chotikul established "More Music" which was a sister company to GRAMMY which sparked the band members to try submitting a demo to them which passed the qualifications. Silly Fools then signed a contract with More Music. Silly Fools then released their first album I.Q.180 which had the song "สู้ไม่ได้" (Soo Mai Dai) and "เมื่อรักฉันเกิด" (Muer-Ruk-Chun-Kerd) which sold 40,000 which was considered as very little compared to other albums but the overall reviews were positive.

In 1999, there was a change in drummers from Korbphob Baiyame (Toey) to Tortakul Baingern (Tor) just before the release of Candy Man. This album made Silly Fools renowned all over Thailand with record breaking sales making Silly Fools into one of the top rock bands in Thailand. Famous songs featured in this album are อย่าบอกว่ารัก (Ya Bok Wa Ruk) ฝัน (Fun) นางฟ้า (Nang Fah) ไหนว่าจะไม่หลอกกัน (Nai Wa Cha Mai Lork Gun) เพียงรัก (Pieng Ruk) and Hey.

In 2000, Silly Fools announced releasing album "Mint" so this album got good feedback from the fanclub before it was released on market and the album sold over 1,000,000 packs. Hit tracks of this album are "จิ๊จ๊ะ" (Jee-Ja), "ฟังดูง่ายง่าย" (Fung-Do-Ngai-Ngai), "คิดถึง" (Kid-Tueng), "150 c.c", "ไม่" (Mai) and "เพลงนี้เกี่ยวกับความรัก" (Pleng-Nee-Keaw-Kub-Kwam-Ruk).

In 2002, Silly Fools released the album Juicy. so this album increased the aggressiveness, heavy to melody and rhythm more than others but not too much as E.P. - I.Q.180. Hit tracks of this album are "บ้าบอ"(Ba-Bor), "ผิดที่ไว้ใจ"(Pid-Tee-Wai-Jai), "แกล้ง"(Klang), "น้ำนิ่งไหลลึก"(Nam-Ning-Lai-Luek), "ขี้หึง"(Kee-Heung), "หน้าไม่อาย"(Nah-Mai-Eye) and "วัดใจ"(Wat-Jai).

After Juicy was released Silly Fools didn't release an album for 2 years and in 2004 Silly Fools released the album King Size. Hit tracks of this album are "แล้วแต่แป๊ะ"(Laew-Tae-Pah), "หนึ่งเดียวของฉัน"(Neung-Deaw-Kong-Chun), "คนที่ฆ่าฉัน"(Kon-Tee-Ka-Chun), "ไม่หวั่นแม้วันมามาก"(Mai-Wun-Mae-Won-Ma-Mak) and "น้ำลาย"(Num-Lie).

=== 2006-2011 Toe resigns ===
In 2006, Toe, the lead singer at the time came out to announce his resignation from Silly Fools, with the reason being that his work environment didn't support his belief in Islamic and internal disagreement with other band members ultimately led to this decision. This was shocking news to the Thai music industry. Toe then formed a new band called Hangman, the other band members announced that they would continue to perform as Silly Fools and were hiring a new vocalist. In 2006 Silly Fools announced that they had a new lead singer which performed in the fate festival concert whilst wearing a mask keeping his identity a secret.

The following December Ton, Rang, Tor, and the new singer started to promote their new album even appearing in several talk shows. They announced that the album would be on sale the following year and that the album was called Mini which was a collection of 5 English songs. They also revealed the identity of the new singer Benjamin Jung Tuffnell. Silly Fools almost changed their lead singer to David Usher by the recommendation of a Canadian band but they declined due to his old age. Mini contained Stay Away as it's the first track.

In 2008 Silly Fools resigned from GMM Grammy to join RS even though they had been working for GMM Grammy for 10 years with Tor the band's drummer releasing the first piece of work before releasing The One album in the following March. The album had 2 versions, an English and Thai version and although the album received good reviews they weren't even close to the albums when Toh was the lead singer. Famous songs in this album include "เราเป็นคนเลือกเอง"(Rao Pen Kon Ruak Eng) "เหนื่อยแล้ว"(Nuay Leaw) "รั้งรอ"(Rung Roh) and "โง่"(Ngo).

Silly Fools released ทำร้าย (Tum Rai) on 1 June 2010.

=== In 2011-2013 Freelance, Single"สูญญากาศ", Tor resigns, Ratn joins ===
Silly Fools released "สูญญากาศ"(Soon-Ya-Kard) on 24 February 2012 at SeedFM 97.5 so for this single Silly Fools has moved out from RS because Silly Fools don't want the pressure to affect their work. By the way, RS agree (RS want Silly Fools to release an album but Silly Fools want to release single). For single "สูญญากาศ"(Soon-Ya-Kard) Silly Fools mix the sound at Canada and get Boyd Kosiyapong (The top songwriter to produce and Warner Bros. Music Thailand take care of marketing).

After the single was released, Tor (Drummer) resigned and moved to be Seksan Sukpimai's backup drummer, and Ratn Dezember's drummer joined.

=== List of events summary ===
- In 1998 Silly Fools moved to the “More Music Label” under GMM Grammy and made first debut album “I.Q. 180”
- In 2006 Silly Fools announced “Toe (singer)” resigned and he created a new band named “Hangman” this was one of the biggest announcements in Thai musical history
- In 2006 Silly Fools announced “Benjamin Jung Tuffnell” was going to be lead vocal and make Ben debut with EP album “Mini”
- In 2008 Silly Fools move from “GMM Grammy” to “RS” the opposite pole of Grammy
- In 2014 Silly Fools moved to “ME Record” under “Muzik Move”.
- On 7 August 2016 The band announced that Krishna Pandonlan (Rim) past lead singer of WOIZE was going to be the lead singer of Silly Fools

== Band members ==
Current members

- Jakarin "Ton" Juprasert (Thai: จักรินทร์ จูประเสริฐ; RTGS: Chakkarin Chuprasoet) – Guitars (1996–present)
- Thewarit "Rang" Srisuk (Thai: เทวฤทธิ์ ศรีสุข; RTGS: Thewarit Sisuk) – Bass guitars (1996-present)
- Tortrakul "Tor" Baingern (Thai: ต่อตระกูล ใบเงิน; RTGS: Tortrakun Bai-ngern) – Drums (1999-2012,2022-present)
- Kritsana "Rim" Pandonlan (Thai: กฤษณะ ปานดอนลาน) – Lead vocal (2015–present)

Former members

- Korbphob "Toey" Baiyame (Thai: กอบภพ ใบแย้ม; RTGS: Kopphop Baiyaem) – Drums (1996-1999)
- Natapol "Toe" Puthpawana (Thai: ณัฐพล พุทธภาวนา; RTGS: Natthaphon Phutphawana) – Lead vocals (1996–2006), formed his new band HANGMAN, but now retired and changed name to 'Firadaus Satthaying' (ฟิรเดาซ์ ศรัทธายิ่ง).
- Ratn Kobayashi (Thai: รัตน์ โกบายาชิ; RTGS: Ratn Kobayashi) – Drums (2013–2022)
- Benjamin "Ben" Jung Tuffnell (Thai: เบนจามิน จุง ทัฟเนล) – Lead vocals (2006–2015)

On June 26, 2006, Natapol Puthpawana quit the band, claiming that he no longer could play in venues serving alcoholic beverages due to his religion.

On November 12, 2006, Silly Fools appeared at the 2006 Fat Festival, performing 2 songs. Their new lead singer, whose identity was not revealed, performed 2 songs while wearing a mask. Both songs that were performed that evening were in English.

On December 21, 2006, Silly Fools (Ton, Rung, Tor) released their latest album "Silly Fools Mini", and unveiled the band's new lead singer, Benjamin Jung Tuffnell. The "Mini" album includes 5 English songs, and was made available for sale around January 26, 2007.

In 2012, Tortrakul Baingen quit the band, with personal reason. In 2013 Ratn Kobayashi became the new permanent drummer for the band. The band produced a single for digital download in 2012 Soon Ya Kad.

Members of the band produced TV shows Rock Rider about rock music and travel on big bike. In 2014, Silly Fools together with the band Airborne, and former lead singer of Big Ass Ekkarat Wongchalard "Dax", formed Rock Rider project to produce music and do concert tours.

== Band Discography ==
=== Studio albums ===
- I.Q. 180 (25 June 1998)
- Candyman (15 July 1999)
- Mint (28 September 2000)
- Juicy (26 March 2002)
- King Size (15 January 2004)
- The One (1 March 2008)

=== Singles and extended plays ===
- Wang Plao (1996)
- Roy Yim (1996)
- Chip Diao Ko Sueng Maen (1996)
- Su Mai Dai (1998)
- Muea Rak Chan Koet (1998)
- Seng (1998)
- Hai Ter (1998)
- Ya Bok Wa Rak (1999)
- Nai Wa Cha Mai Lok Kan (1999)
- Nang Fah (1999)
- Khit thueng (2000)
- Chi Cha (2000)
- Phleng Ni Kiao Khap Khwam Rak (2000)
- Fung doo Ngai Ngai (2000)
- Pid Thi Wai Jai (2002)
- Khi Hueng (2002)
- Ba Bor (2002)
- Nam Ning Lai Luek (2002)
- Wat Jai (2002)
- Nam lai (2004)
- Khon Thi Kha Chan (2004)
- Nueng Diao Khong Chan (2004)
- Mai Wan Mae Wan Ma Mak (2004)
- Man Aep Yu Khang Khrueang (2004)
- Phleng Khong Thoe (2004)
- Buea (2004)
- X1 (Yamaha X1 Ad. Song) (2005)
- Kao Klai Pai Kab Chun (Yamaha X1 Ad. Song) (2005)
- Rao Pen Khon Lueak Eng (2008)
- Ngo (2008)
- Rang Ror (2008)
- Tham Rai (2010)
- Soon Ya Kard (2012)
- Standing tall (2014)
- Pae Ya Rong (2016)
- Jong Riak Thoe Wa Nang Pha Ya (2017)
- 20 Tula (2018)
- Sat Rai (2019) (Record with BIG BAG band)
- MIST (2019) (Record with Zeal band)
- ORANGE (2020)
- Lang Mue (2021)
- Phae Khwam On Air (2021)
- Thep Lee Lah (2023)
- Kae Kid Kor Mun Laew (2025)
- Mai Koey Klai Por (2026)

=== EPs ===
- Bakery Sampler (With Wisetniyom , Stone Soul Band) (1996)
- Mini (2007)

=== Compilations ===
- Combo (2004)
- The Singles (2006)
- Hits (2010)
- Best of Silly Fools (2013)
- RS Gold Collection Silly Fools Best Album (2014)

=== Other songs ===
- Motion picture music teentalk (1998)
- Motion picture music Yamaha x1 (2005)
- Motion picture music Phlik Fa La Tawan (2009)

== Awards ==
Silly Fools got 7 awards from 2000 to 2009

=== 13th Season Awards (2000) ===
- Best Rock Group Artist Award (Album : Mint)
- Best Rock Album Award (Album : Mint)

=== 15th Season Awards (2002) ===
- Best Rock Group Artist Award (Album : Juicy)

=== 1st Fat Award (2003) ===
- Artist's Choice Award

=== MTV Asia Awards (2005) ===
- Popular Thai Artist Award

=== 21st Season Awards (2008) ===
- Best Rock Group Artist Award (Album : The One)

=== 4th SEED AWARDS (2009) ===
- Seed Music Video of the year (Song : Rao Pen Khon Lueak Eng)
- Seed Rock Album of the year (Album : The One)

=== POP Music Awards (2009) ===
- Pop Rock Artist Award

== Concert ==
Date	Name of the concert	Place	Remark
21 December 2002	Fat Live V3	Indoor Stadium Huamark	On 29 May 2014, The DVD " Fat Live V3 : Khabuankan Silly Fools"
19 July 2008	Silly Fools-Ebola One Way Concert	Indoor Stadium Huamark	The One Way Concert of 2 rock bands
1 July 2017	LEO Presents SILLY WAR II Concert	Thunderdome Mueang Thong Tha Ni	The Silly Fool's return.
5 October 2019	LEO Presents ZEALY FOOLS CONCERT	Thunderdome Mueang Thong Tha Ni	The combination of Silly Fools and Zeal concert. Making the biggest concert in 2019
13 June 2026	LEO PRESENTS 30 YEARS SILLY FOOLS CONCERT	Impact Arena Mueang Thong Tha Ni	The Silly Fools 30 Years anniversary concert
