= Labanoon =

Thai pop rock band

Labanoon (ลาบานูน)
- Origin: Bangkok, Thailand
- Genres: Pop rock; alternative rock
- Years active: 1998–2006; 2012–present
- Labels: Music Bugs (1998–2006, 2009–2014); Genie (since 2015)
- Members: Metee Arun; Anan Saman; Nattanon Srisaranon
- Past members: Somporn Yuso

Labanoon (Thai: ลาบานูน) are a Thai pop rock trio from Bangkok, active since 1998, with a break between 2006 and 2009. Since their formation, their lineup has mostly remained the same and currently consists of Metee Arun (เมธี อรุณ) on vocals and guitar, Anan Saman (อนันต์ สะมัน) on bass, and Nattanon Srisaranon (ณัฐนนท์ ศรีศรานนท์) on drums. As of 2026, they have released nine studio albums. The band's name, Labanoon (Arabic: لَبَنٌ), means "milk" in Arabic.

== History ==
=== Formation, success, and hiatus: 1998–2006 ===
Metee Arun, Anan Saman, and Somporn Yuso studied together at the Islamic College of Thailand in Bangkok and later formed the band Labanoon. The name, which means "milk" in Arabic (لَبَنٌ), was inspired both by the language of the band members' religion as well as the idea of making "music as plain as milk". Shortly after forming, Labanoon was offered a record deal by Music Bugs (มิวสิค บั๊กส์), a subsidiary of GMM Grammy, after they were spotted in a music contest.

The band released their debut album, titled Nom Sod (นมสด – "fresh milk"), in 1998. It was preceded by the single "Yam" (ยาม – "guard"). This was followed a year later by 191, which spawned the singles "191" and "Bang At Rak Ter" (บังอาจรักเธอ – "I may love you"). Their third album, Khon Tua Dam (คนตัวดำ – "black-body person"), was released in 2002. Three more albums followed: Clear (2003), Siam Center (สยามเซ็นเตอร์) (2005), and 24 Chua Mong (24 ชั่วโมง – "24 hours") (2006).

As their recording contract with Bugs came to an end in 2006, the band decided to go on hiatus. Metee and Anan took jobs elsewhere, and Somporn went on to play drums with the group Kala.

=== Return from hiatus: since 2012 ===
In 2012, Metee and Anan reformed the group together with drummer Nattanon Srisaranon, previously of Oblivious (อ็อบบลิเวียส). They released the album Keep Rocking, which spawned the single "Prakan chan 3" (ประกันชั้น 3 – "3rd-class insurance")

Two years later, the band signed with Genie Records and subsequently issued the single "Suksa Naree" (ศึกษานารี – "female student"). "Palang Ngarn Jon" (พลังงานจน – "low energy"), featuring luk thung singer Paowalee Pornpimon, and "Chueak Wiset" (เชือกวิเศษ – "magic rope"), followed in 2015. A fourth single, "Pae Thang" (แพ้ทาง – "lost my way"), preceded the release of the album N.E.W.S. in 2016. Comedian and actor Boriboon Chanrueng appeared in the band's next single, "Phanak ngan dab phleng" (พนักงานดับเพลิง – "fireman"), following a promotional campaign that stated that he would become Labanoon's new vocalist. The album's final single, "Chan kong" (ฉันก็คง – "I may"), featured Thai actress Kamolnet Rueangsri (กมลเนตร เรืองศรี).

In February 2016, Music Bugs filed a lawsuit against GMM Grammy and Labanoon for copyright infringement, claiming that the band didn't own the rights to the songs from their seven preceding albums.

In 2017, the band won Artist of the Year at the Joox Thailand Music Awards.

== Band members ==
Current

- Metee Arun (เมธี อรุณ) – lead vocals, guitar
- Anan Saman (อนันต์ สะมัน) – bass, backing vocals
- Nattanon Srisaranon (ณัฐนนท์ ศรีศรานนท์) – drums

Past

- Somporn Yuso (สมพร ยูโซ๊ะ) – drums

== Discography ==
- นมสด (1998)
- 191 (1999)
- คนตัวดำ (2002)
- Clear (2003)
- สยามเซ็นเตอร์ (2005)
- 24 ชั่วโมง (2006)
- Keep Rocking (15th Anniversary) (2013)
- นมข้นหวาน: The Very Best of Labanoon (2015)
- N.E.W.S. (2016)
- Delivery (2021)
