= Loso =

Thai rock band

Loso (โลโซ)
- Origin: Bangkok, Thailand
- Genres: Rock; alternative rock; grunge (early)
- Years active: 1994–2003, 2021–2025, 2026 - Present
- Labels: More Music, GMM Grammy (1996-2002); Luster Entertainment (2021-2025)
- Members: Seksan Sukpimai (Sek); Kittisak Khoatkam (Yai); Apirath Sukkhajitr (Rath); Nattaphon Suntharaanu (Klang)

Loso (Thai: โลโซ) are a Thai rock band fronted by singer–guitarist–composer Seksan Sukpimai (a.k.a. Sek Loso). The band was formed in 1994 in Bangkok, Thailand. Its name is derived from a play on hi-so, Thai slang for socialites and the upper class (from English 'high society'), and is meant to reflect the group's humble origins. They are one of the first Thai bands to achieve minimal recognition beyond Thailand, having played festivals, including South By Southwest and Glastonbury. Loso disbanded in 2003, and afterwards, Seksan continued as Sek Loso up until November 2021 when they reformed.

In the mid-1990s, Loso established itself as part of the Thai rock scene. Shortly after signing to Asanee Chotikul's More Music label, distributed by GMM Grammy, they released their first album, Lo-Society, in 1996. They developed an original sound of fusing guitar-driven indie music, a style previously explored with rock band Carabao, with traditional Thai melodies and rhythms. Loso achieved unexpected mainstream success in Thailand with their second album Entertainment, described as being a "record for the Thai industry", having sold over two million copies. This was continued with later albums they released, averaging around a million copies sold in Thailand.

== History ==
=== Formation (1993–1996) ===
In 1993, Seksan Sukpimai was playing in various bands in Nakhon Sawan province while studying at Nakorn Ratchasima Technical College. During his time studying electrical engineering at Nakorn Sawan Technical College, Sek performed in various pubs across provinces and played for a band named "Diamond", where he met Apirat Sukchit, commonly known as Ratt, a fellow musician. After Diamond broke up in 1994, Sek and Yai formed a short-lived band named Climax. When Climax broke up in mid-1994, Sek and Yai relocated to Bangkok to pursue their music career more seriously, both together and apart. Despite their enthusiasm, they faced considerable challenges in gaining recognition. Their initial attempts to secure a record deal were met with repeated rejections due to their unconventional image and music style, which differed significantly from the prevalent pop and rock trends. Later in 1995, Sek and Yai joined with Apirath "Rath" Sukkhajitr, completing the original trio.

Inspired by the grunge rock movement, particularly bands like Nirvana, Loso aimed to capture a similar raw, powerful sound while incorporating elements of heavy metal. Their musical goal was to connect with everyday people by reflecting their struggles and emotions through their music. The name "Loso" was chosen to symbolize their commitment to representing ordinary people through their work, setting them apart from the mainstream music of the time.

=== Success (1996–1998) ===
In 1996, Loso's fortunes began to change when they were introduced to Saksit Tangthong, a prominent figure in the Thai music industry. Tang invited the band to perform as a backing group on his album Dek Lang Hong (Back Room Boy) and later recommended their demo to Asanee Chotikul, a well-known rock musician and founder of the newly established More Music label. Asanee was intrigued by Loso's distinctive style and sound, eventually signing the band to his record label. This led to the refinement of their previous demos that were rejected.

Eager to make their mark in the music industry, the band dedicated themselves to perfecting their demos in preparation for their debut album. The recording sessions for their debut album took place at the Butterfly Studio, a well-regarded recording location in Bangkok, over a 20-day period between January and February of that year. The band worked closely with Pichet Kruawan, a member of the band "Y NOT 7", who served as a co-producer alongside Loso. The choice of studio and producer was crucial in shaping the album's sound, which combined elements of grunge with heavy metal influences. During the recording sessions, Loso focused on capturing both their energetic grunge and powerful heavy metal influences. The band crafted each track to balance fast, aggressive guitar riffs with slower, more introspective moments. This approach was evident in songs like "คน" (Khon), which showcased a heavy metal edge, and the grunge-influenced tracks that resonated with the Seattle sound reminiscent of Nirvana. The recording sessions were marked by a sense of urgency and excitement. Loso's members, Sek, Yai, and Rath, brought their individual talents and distinct styles to the project. Sek's versatile guitar work and vocals were central to the album's sound, while Yai's drumming and Rath's bass playing provided the solid foundation necessary for their grunge and metal fusion. Loso's debut album, Lo-Society, was released by the label on April 30, 1996, and was an instant hit, selling over a million copies in Thailand. Despite relying solely on posters and word-of-mouth for promotion, the band's blend of rock music and street-smart lyrics resonated with audiences. Following its release, the album received extensive airplay on radio stations nationwide, generating multiple local hit songs, even without significant promotional efforts.

Later in 1997, Loso released Red Bike as the soundtrack album to the film Red Bike Story starring by Mos Patiparn and Tata Young.

On March 26, 1998, Loso released their second album, Entertainment, alternatively known as Loso Entertainment, through the More Music label. Commercially, Entertainment is the band's best-selling album to date, it achieved sales of over two million copies in Thailand (Note: Attributed to multiple references:) and earned Loso the Season Award, Thailand's annual rock awards, for Best Group in 1999. The album's singles "Som San" and "Arai Gaw Yaum" also gained significant popularity in Thailand.

=== Rock & Roll to The Red Album (1999–2001) ===
In 1999, Rath left Loso for personal reasons, causing Loso to stop touring and go on hiatus for a period of time. They eventually returned to the studio with as a two-man band working with Silly Fool's producer Simon Henderson to produce their third album, Rock & Roll. Sales of the album exceeded one million copies. Following the release of Rock & Roll, bassist Nattaphon "Klang" Suntharaanu joined as a temporary member.

In February 2001, Loso released the fourth album Losoland. Sales of the album exceeded only 700,000 copies.

Six months later, Loso released the fifth album called The Red Album in August 2001, so named at the recommendation of Paiboon Damrongchaitham, Chairman of the Board of Directors of GMM Grammy, with an album cover designed as a symbolic expression against the pirating of CDs and tapes in Thailand. The Red Album included unreleased songs from the previous albums with only a few newly composed songs. The opening song of the album is "Pan Tip", a song written by Sek that ridiculed and satirized the Pan Tip Plaza, a popular venue for the sale of pirated CD tapes in Thailand at that time. Sales of The Red Album exceeded 900,000 copies.

Following the release of The Red Album, "Rath" Sukkhajitr returned to the band after an absence of almost three years.

Three months after the release of The Red Album, Loso's first concert, Concert For Friends, was held on 10 November 2001 at Velodrome Hua Mak stadiums.

=== Dispersed (2002–2019) ===
After the big concert, Loso continued gigs until January 2002. Loso ceased touring, and in 2003 Sek announced that Loso had disbanded and separated so that he could continue his studies in England. After returning to Thailand, Sukpimai released a special album with Thongchai McIntyre ("Bird") titled Bird-Sek in 2004, to celebrate the 20th anniversary of GMM Grammy. Bird-Sek achieved the highest album sales of the year in Thailand at two million copies. Afterwards, Sukpimai continued to tour and record as a solo artist.

Following Loso's breakup, Yai and Rath formed the band Fahrenheit together with Pichet Krueawan, a guitarist and former members of Y not 7, and Piraporn "Zai" Prampanas as lead vocalist. Sukkhajitr left Fahrenheit and retired from music shortly afterward due to health problems. Yai, in addition to his work with Fahrenheit, became the drummer for Asanee-Wasan and a session musician. Suntharaanu joined the band Pon La Lak Ruk Oei, and when that band disbanded, he worked as a sound engineer and pursued other business interests.

=== Reuniting (2019–2025) ===
On 10 October 2019, Sek posted a picture of himself with former bandmates Yai and Rath. The image sparked hope that the band might reunite after 17 years. Then, on 12 September 2020, Loso members Yai, Rath and Klang attended the wedding of Sukpimai and Karn Wipakorn, where the bandmates joined together to perform for the wedding party.

On 18 December 2021, Loso performed the LOSO Reunion Live Streaming concert, their first concert in 20 years. Since 2022, Loso has returned to touring throughout Thailand with members Sek, Yai and Klang. Rath has been unable to rejoin the band due to health concerns.

=== Hiatus (2025–2026) ===
After the supreme court verdict lead to Sek's incarceneration for 2 years and 12 months without suspension, the band forced to gone hiatus.

=== Sek's released on parole, resumes activity (2026 - Present) ===
Sek Loso has been released on parole in 24 June 2026, and the band resume activity

== Musical influences and impact ==
Loso's music has been significantly shaped by various influences and has made a considerable impact on the Thai rock scene.

=== Influences ===
Loso's primary influence was the grunge movement of the early 1990s, particularly bands like Nirvana. The raw, emotive sound of grunge, characterized by its heavy guitar riffs and introspective lyrics, resonated deeply with the band members. This influence is evident in their music, which combines powerful, distorted guitars with conscious lyrics that explore personal and emotional themes. In addition to grunge, Loso incorporated elements of heavy metal into their music. This blend gave their sound a distinctive edge, characterized by aggressive rhythms and powerful solos. The incorporation of metal influences allowed Loso to create a unique musical style that distinguished them from other contemporary Thai bands. Beyond these genres, Loso's music also drew on traditional rock elements and local Thai influences, such as the much more experienced Thai band Carabao. The band's ability to blend Western rock styles with Thai sensibilities contributed to their distinctive sound, making their music accessible and relatable to a broad audience in Thailand.

=== Impact ===
Loso's impact on the Thai music scene was profound and transformative. Their debut album, Lo-Society, released in 1996, marked a significant shift in the Thai rock genre. The album's blend of grunge and heavy metal elements resonated with a broad audience, leading to its widespread success and acclaim. The album not only broke new ground for alternative rock in Thailand but also achieved commercial success, with over a million copies sold and multiple re-releases. By achieving commercial success with a sound that was both innovative and rooted in traditional rock elements, they helped to pave the way for other rock bands and alternative artists in Thailand. This was further demonstrated with their second album Entertainment, which saw more success and spawned their iconic songs. Their influence extended beyond music, as their distinctive style and lyrics became a part of the cultural conversation. The band's distinctive sound and lyrical focus contributed to a growing interest in alternative rock in Thailand. Loso's success helped pave the way for other Thai rock and alternative bands, influencing the direction of Thai music in the late 1990s. Their music provided a new, relatable voice for Thai listeners, moving away from mainstream pop and exploring more raw, authentic expressions of emotion.

== Band members ==
=== Current members ===
- Seksan Sukpimai (Sek) - lead vocals, lead and rhythm guitars, composer of all songs of the band (1996-2002, 2021-2025)
- Kittisak Khoatkham (Yai) - drum, backing and lead vocals (1996-2002, 2021-2025)
- Apirath Sukkhajitr (Rath) - bass guitar, backing and lead vocals (1996-1998, 2001-2002, 2024-2025)
- Nattaphon Suntharaanu (Klang) – bass guitar, backing vocals (1999-2001, 2021-2025)

== Discography ==
=== Studio albums ===
- Lo-Society (1996)
- Entertainment (1998)
- Rock & Roll (1999)
- Losoland (2001)
- The Red Album (August 2001)

=== Compilation albums ===
- Lo-Society (Bonus Tracks, 1996)
- Best of Loso (CD, 1999)
- Best of Loso (Karaoke VCD, 1999, 2001)
- Loso: Concert for Friends (VCD, 2002)
- Loso: Best Of Collection (30 April 2013)

== Concert ==
Name of the concert	Date	Place	Remark	Citation
LOSO Concert For Friends	10 September 2001	Velodrome Hua Mak stadiums	The first concert of Loso, held for only one performance	
LOSO Reunion Live Streaming Concert	18 December 2021		the first concert of Loso in 20 years via Live streaming	

== Awards ==
- 11th Seesan Award (1998) - Best Rock Group Artist Award (Album: LOSO Entertainment)
- 14th Seesan Award (2001) - Best Rock Group Artist Award (Album: Losoland)
