= Asanee–Wasan =

Thai rock duo

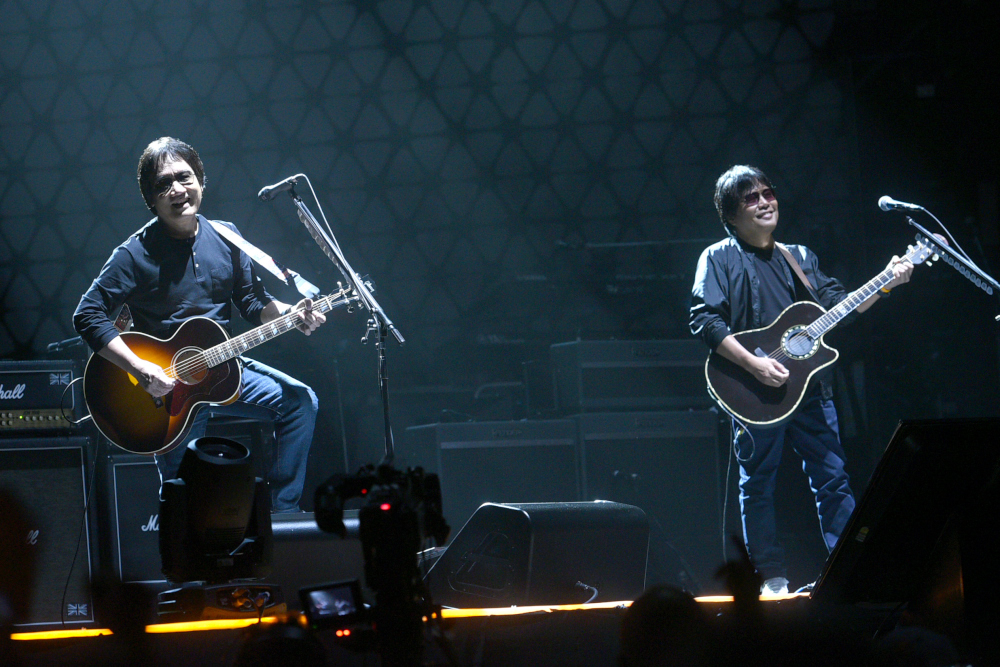
- Asanee–Wasan in 2016

Background information
- Origin: Loei, Thailand
- Genres: Pop rock; progressive rock; new wave; hard rock; country; folk blues; folk; world music
- Years active: 1986–2026
- Labels: Nite Spot; GMM Grammy; More Music; Music Union
- Members: Asanee Chotikul; Wasan Chotikul
- Website: moremusic.co.th

Asanee–Wasan (Thai: อัสนี–วสันต์) is a Thai rock band fronted by brothers Asanee "Pom" and Wasan "Toh" Chotikul. Among the band's hits is a 1989 song that sets to music the lengthy ceremonial name for Bangkok, "Krung Thep Mahanakhon" ("กรุงเทพมหานคร"). The elder brother, Asanee, is known for his guitar solos and his wild, "rock star" persona. His way of singing ballads is often described as broken-heart jiggo (jiggo is Thai slang for bad boy, based on Gigolo in English and Italian). The bespectacled Wasan is known for his sensitive songs and softer, gentler style. Their songs often include a hook chorus sung by female backing vocalists. They have been releasing music and holding concerts from 1986 until 2026.

== History ==
The Chotikul brothers were born in Loei Province in Northeast Thailand (Asanee: April 9, 1955, Wasan: March 25, 1957) and moved to Bangkok to study. They started out in the 1970s as a folk-rock combo called Isn't. The band name is derived from Isan, their home region in Thailand. The band participated in a folk song competition and won the award in 1974. After that they released several albums, including Sao ngam ta (Beautiful Girl) and Siam Square. Asanee, wanting to go in a more rock direction left the band, while Wasan continued for a time with Isn't. Asanee joined The Oriental Funk band of Rewat Buddhinan and later Butterfly.

The brothers released their first album as Asanee–Wasan in 1986, Bah horb fang (Carry a lot of Things) with Nite Spot. They were signed to Grammy Entertainment (now GMM Grammy) and released another album, Puk-chee roy nah (Sufficiency Makeover), which included the hits "Nung Mit Chid Klai" ("A Close Friend") and "Kor Keui Sanya" ("Used to Promise").

In concerts they frequently throw autographed guitar picks into the crowd as souvenirs. They are glued onto their guitar or microphone stand ready to be handed out. When they released their sixth album, Rung gin narm (Rainbow), they decided not to have any concerts to support the album. Therefore, a guitar pick was included in each copy of Rung gin narm (though not in subsequent production runs of the album).

Besides his work with his brother, Asanee Chotikul has been an influential producer for such bands as Micro and Tanate Waragulnukrao. When Thai rocker Sek Loso wanted to land a record deal, he mailed a demo tape to Asanee, who then released it on his own label, More Music, a subsidiary of GMM Grammy.

Asanee–Wasan celebrated with a 20th anniversary concert on May 12–14, 2006 at Impact Arena in Muang Thong Thani. Originally, just one show had been planned, but when tickets quickly sold out, two more were added, which also sold out. The pair also played shows in Nakhon Ratchasima and in Phuket. They were backed by Fahrenheit.

In 2011, they left GMM Grammy and co-founded a new company, Music Union, with fellow producers Chatree Kongsuwan, Nitipong Hornak and singer/businessman Vudtinun Bhirombhakdi. Asanee and Wasan have released some singles, available via digital download, with the new company. Artists joining Music Union includes Blackhead, Jamjun Project, Nicole Theriault, etc.

In 2024, the duo reunited to release the single "Ter Ja Pen Yang Chan Bang Rue Plao?" (เธอจะเป็นอย่างฉันบ้างหรือเปล่า; Will You Be Like Me?) under Move Records, which marked their final single. Two years later, in 2026, Asanee–Wasan announced their farewell concert, Farewell Concert Asanee–Wasan “I Want to Emphasize One Last Time…”, held at Impact Arena, Muang Thong Thani. The event comprised four regular performances on 2, 3, 5, and 6 September, followed by a final charity performance for the Ramathibodi Foundation on 8 September. Due to unforeseen circumstances affecting the initial performance, that show was cancelled and a replacement performance was scheduled for 9 September. Accordingly, 9 September 2026 is regarded as the group’s official disbandment date, concluding 40 years of activity under the name Asanee–Wasan.

== Wasan solo works ==
In an Asanee–Wasan album, Wasan usually sings lead on only one or two songs. In the remaining songs, he would play guitar alongside his brother and sing backing harmonies. Nevertheless, the song Khong Derm (Still the Same), one of the duo's hits is sung by Wasan. Another hit song Nueng Mit Chit Klai was Wasan's work from his Isn't days and was rearranged for Asanee–Wasan. Wasan has some albums of his own with Isn't. Even after becoming Asanee–Wasan, he released two more solo albums, Guitar Toh in 1988 with Isn't, and Khuen Toh in 1992.

== Discography ==
- Bah Horb Fang (Carry a lot of Things), 1986
- Puk-chee Roy Nah (Window Dressing), 1987
- Kra-dee Dai Nam (As Happy As a Lark), 1988
- Fuk Tong (Pumpkin), 1989
- Sup-pa-rod (Pineapple), 1990
- Rung Gin Nam (Rainbow), 1993
- Bang Or (Ah!), 1997
- Jin-ta-na-karn (Imagination), 2002
- Sen Yai (DVD–VCD of concert "Sen Yai" on 2 February 2003, also on cassette, two versions), 2003
- Asanee & Wasan (boxed set of first eight albums), 2006
- Dek Lieng Gae (The Boy Who Cried Wolf), 2006
- Concert 20th Year (DVD–VCD), 2006
- Pug Ron (Summer Break), 2007

Singles with Music Union

- Pud loy loy, 2012 (Asanee)
- Khao rai rue plao (Is it bad news?), 2013 (Wasan)

Singles with Muzik Move

- Pud ma loey, 2015 (Asanee)
- Jai yen yen (Calm down), 2019
- Ter ja pen yang chan bang rue plao (Will you be like me?), 2024

== Pop On Stage (Lok Don Tri) Performances ==
Performance	Date	Venue	Setlist
Puk-chee Roy Nah	August 16, 1987	Lan Lok Don Tri, Sanam Pao, RTA Channel 5	1. Hai Mun Pen Pai (Let It Be); 2. Tung Tung Tee Roo (Despite Knowing); 3. Neung Mit Chit Krai (A Companion Close at Hand); 4. Bang-On Aow Tae Non (Bang-On Keeps Sleeping); 5. Nam Euy Nam Jai (Oh Kindness); 6. Sai Lor Fai (Lightning Rod); 7. Bah Horb Fang (Carry A Lot of Things); 8. Kor Koei San-Ya (Once Promised)
Kra-dee Dai Nam	June 5, 1988	Lan Lok Don Tri, Sanam Pao, RTA Channel 5	1. Kor Koei San-Ya (Carry A Lot of Things); 2. Yin Yom (Agreed); 3. Tum Dee Dai Dee (Do Good, Be Rewarded); 4. Beuak; 5. Wee-Naa-Gweang-Gwai (Swinging Lute); 6. Rum-Rai (Tardy); 7. Bang-On Ao Tae Non (Bang-On Keeps Sleeping); 8. Bang-Earn Tid Din (Down-to-earth Bang-Earn)
Taam Ha Fuk Tong	April 16, 1989	Lan Lok Don Tri, Sanam Pao, RTA Channel 5	1. Bang-Earn Tid Din (Down-to-earth Bang-Earn); 2. Yin Yom (Consent); 3. Yak Ja Leoum (Want To Forget); 4. Woa Leoum Tua (Cow Forgetting Itself); 5. Suk-Jai (Joyous); 6. Hua-Jai Sa-On (Soft-hearted Fool); 7. Dai Yang Sia Yang (Got One, Lose One); 8. Yin-Dee Mai Mee Pun-Ha (can be translated into “Carefree Yindee” or “No Problem, You’re Welcome”)
Kid-Teung Lor-Ling	November 4, 1990	Lan Lok Don Tri, Sanam Pao, RTA Channel 5	1. Sup-pa-rod (Pineapple); 2. Bang-Earn Tid Din (Down-to-earth Bang-Earn); 3. Ter Pun Jai (Two-timer); 4. Tum-Mai (Why); 5. Mai Joob (Not Over); 6. Lek Long (Smaller and Smaller); 7. Koom Jai (Troubled)

**"Kra-dee Dai Nam" and "Sup-pa-rod" are missing some songs, and the setlist order is unofficial.**
