= Chatree Kongsuwan =

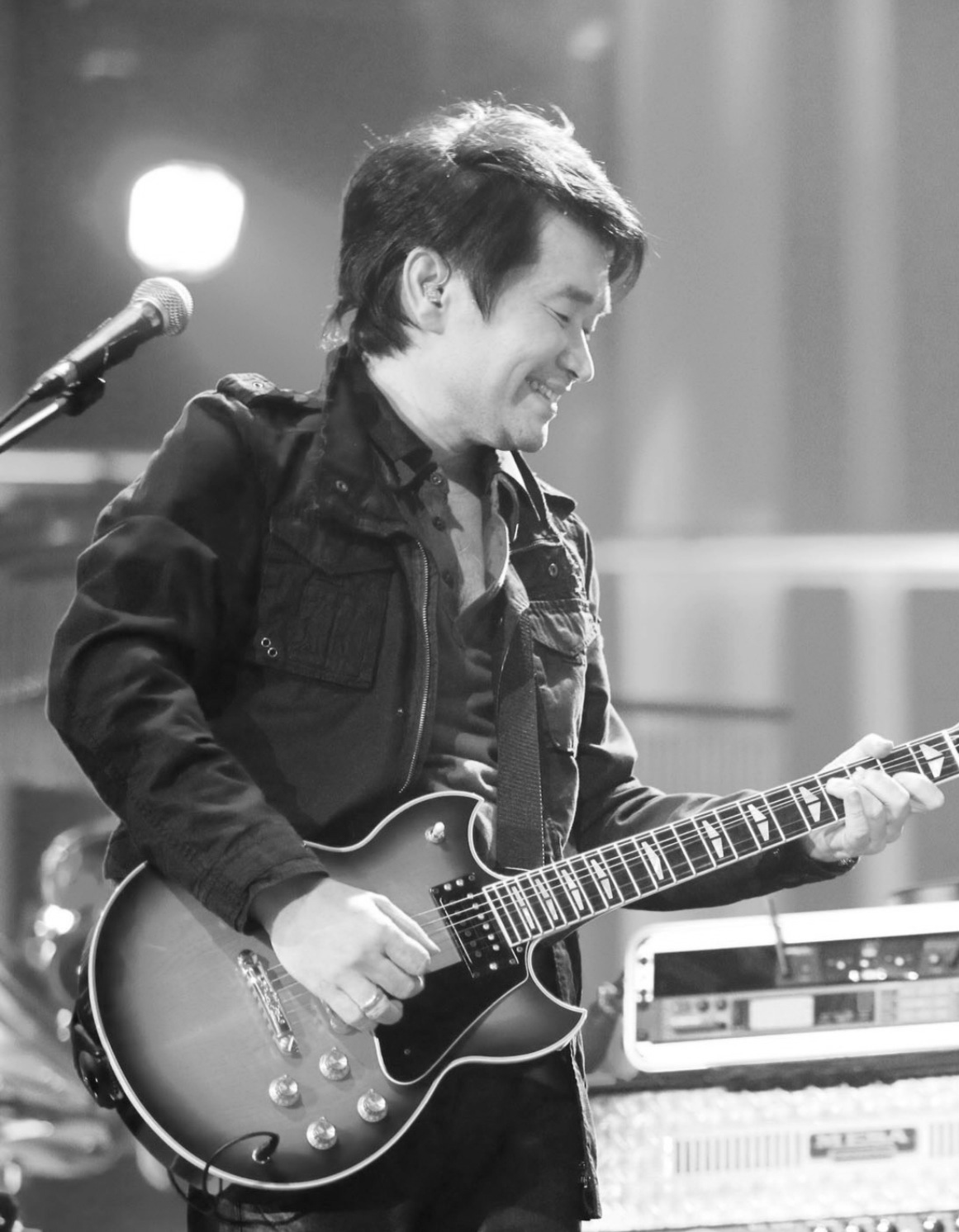

Background information
- Born: March 17, 1962 (age 64); Ratchaburi province
- Genres: Rock; Pop
- Occupations: Singer, Guitarist, Songwriter, Record Producer, Record Executive
- Instruments: Guitar; Saxophone; Keyboard; Bass; Drum; Mouth Organ
- Labels: Nititad Promotion; GMM Grammy

Chatree Kongsuwan (Thai: ชาตรี คงสุวรรณ; born 17 March 1962), also known by his nickname Ohm (Thai: โอม), is a Thai musician, guitarist, composer, producer and record executive. He first achieved recognition in the Thai music industry during the 1980s as the singer, guitarist and a songwriter for The Innocent.

Following the group's disbandment, Chatree transitioned into producer and songwriting roles, working with Rewat Buddhinan and GMM Grammy. During this period, he composed and arranged songs for several Thai pop and rock artists, including Christina Aguilar, Mai Charoenpura, and Thongchai McIntyre. He later held executive positions within the company, serving as the executive of the GMM Grammy music label RPG and resign from GMM Grammy to co-founding Music Union (later rebranded as Muzik Move). In addition to his producer and executive work, Chatree released a solo instrumental album, Into The Light, in 2008, which received multiple Seesan Awards, including Best Album and Best Instrumental Song.

== Early life and education ==
Chatree Kongsuwan was born on 17 March 1962 in Bang Phae District, Ratchaburi Province, Thailand. He was the second of three children. His father was a Ministry of Interior official who served as a district chief before passing away between Chatree's childhood; he was subsequently raised by his mother.

Chatree completed his primary and secondary education at Daruna Ratchaburi School. He later pursued vocational education at Ratchaburi Technical College, graduating from the electrical department. Despite his vocational training in engineering, Chatree chose to pursue a professional career in music immediately upon graduation, having developed an interest in playing the guitar and other musical instruments during his youth.

== Career ==
=== Early career and The Innocent ===
Before achieving mainstream recognition, Chatree began his musical career as a professional circuit musician. He performed as a guitarist with local bands, including Four Singles and Romantic, playing in various entertainment venues. In 1982, he joined The Innocent as a guitarist, vocalist, and songwriter. He made his debut with the band on their third studio album, Yu Hor (อยู่หอ, 1982), followed by Piang Krasip (เพียงกระซิบ, 1983), which marked the band's transition toward a pop-rock sound.

During the member of The Innocent, Chatree composed, and arranged on several of the band's successful tracks, including "Piang Krueng Jai" (เพียงครึ่งใจ) and "Fak Rak" (ฝากรัก) (the track that Chatree composed during as the member of the Romantic band and brought to re-arranged). The band released subsequent albums through Nititad Promotion, including Rak Kue A-rai (รักคืออะไร, 1984), Lok Bai Kao (โลกใบเก่า, 1985), and their final studio album, Krang Nee Khong Pee Kub Nong (ครั้งนี้ของพี่กับน้อง, 1986), 10 Nalika (10 นาฬิกา, 1989), before entering an indefinite hiatus.

=== Mid-1980s: Involvement with Ploy ===
During the mid-1980s, The Innocent temporarily paused both their album production and touring concert activities. During this period of hiatus, Chatree was invited by Danupol Kaewkarn to participate in a newly formed band named Ploy (วงพลอย). He joined the ensemble during its initial phase of the band in 1986, working alongside musicians such as Wasu Saengsingkaeo Rak Sawadsitang and Anusarn Khunadilok.

In its earliest stages, Ploy functioned primarily as a backup band for Danupol's solo concert tours and studio recordings following his departure from Grand Ex'. Chatree served as a guitar support and musical arranger during live shows and studio sessions. To avoid potential conflicts with his ongoing commitment to The Innocent once the band was ready to resume its activities, Chatree later stepped back from the touring lineup of Ploy before the band transitioned into a fully artist under Nititad Promotion, although he continued to assist them occasionally behind the scenes as a session musician.

=== 1989–2000s: GMM Grammy and producer work ===
In the late 1980s, Chatree began working behind the scenes as a studio session guitarist and arranger. He participated in the "Puekkkk...!" concert in 1986 alongside Rewat Buddhinan, which facilitated his entry work into GMM Grammy label. Following the cessation of activities by The Innocent, Chatree transitioned into a full-time career as a record producer and arranger for GMM Grammy, collaborating closely with Buddhinan.

He served as the producer for various major Thai pop and rock releases throughout the 1990s. Notably, he produced Christina Aguilar's debut album Ninja (1990) and her 1994 album Red Hot (รหัสร้อน). His production and arrangement credits during this period also include works for prominent Thai artists such as Thongchai McIntyre, Mai Charoenpura, Micro, Billy Ogan, and Inca.

=== 2000s–present: Executive roles and solo projects ===
In the 2000s, Chatree expanded into executive roles. He managed RPG, a subsidiary label under GMM Grammy after Buddhinan's death. In 2011, he resigned from GMM Grammy to co-founded the independent music label Music Union alongside industry peers including Nitipong Honark and Asanee Chotikul; the entity was later rebranded as Muzik Move.

Chatree released a solo instrumental album, Into The Light, in 2008 through his imprint, Mister Music. The album received three Seesan Awards in 2009, including Best Album, Best Male Solo Artist, and Best Instrumental Song for the track "Song For RW." Beyond studio production and executive duties, Chatree has functioned as a musical director for various television programs and national entertainment projects, including the reality talent franchise True Academy Fantasia.
