= The Innocent (Thai band) =

Thai musical group

- Genres: Folk; Rock; Progressive Rock; Pop; Pop rock
- Years active: 1980-1989
- Label: Nititad Promotion
- Members: Peerasant Chuab-samai; Chatree Kongsuwan; Saichol Radom-kij; Senee Chatwichai

The Innocent (Thai: ดิ อินโนเซ้นท์) was a Thai band active during the 1980s. Formed in 1980 and disbanded in 1989, the group was signed to Nititad Promotion. The band originated as a trio of students from Daruna Ratchaburi School in Ratchaburi Province. Initially performing pop-folk music, they later transitioned into a string combo style. Peerasant Chuabsamai, a founding member and the band’s long-time leader, was the most musically experienced member and played a significant role in shaping the group’s musical direction.

== History ==
=== The Beginning of The Innocent ===
The Innocent was first formed on December 23, 1979. It was Christmas Day, and the setting was a student folk song contest held at Daruna Ratchaburi School in Ratchaburi Province. the band originally consisted of three members: band leader Peerasant Chuab-samai, Saichon Radomkij, and Sittisak Kit-teng. The band went on to win the contest with the songs "Born To Love You" and "Samphan Thai"

In 1980, Ratchaburi province wanted to promote youth music. Therefore, they organized a youth Folk Song contest. The Innocent entered the contest and won the first prize again. The band was then contacted to make their first studio album, the album. "Love Never Ends" (รักไม่รู้ดับ), which was first released in 1980, was not a huge success. After that, in March 1981, during the school holidays, Surin, who was the band's manager, had them start working on their second studio album, called "Bang Pakong" (บางปะกง), which was released in June of the same year but was unsuccessful again.

=== 1981–1989 ===
Later, Surin bought the copyright for Patiparn Suksuthi's song "Failed Exam (สอบตก)", and the band decided that The Innocent's 3rd album should be written about students because Peerasanti who was the band leader was about to graduate. Additionally, Daruna Ratchaburi School did not want the band to play romantic songs because all the members were Christian. Thus, they bought the song "Kwan Jai Nak Rien (ขวัญใจนักเรียน)" by Kru Phayong Mukda, a famous composer, to put in the album along with two new songs that Peerasanti had composed for the album.

During this time, the band also welcomed a new member, Kriengsak Jongthiratham, who was a friend from the same school, this album also marked the change in genre to pop music and changed the band's style to a full string band with Peerasanti as the keyboardist, Saichon as the guitarist and Sittisak as bassist As a result, this album was a huge success, with the song "Failed Exam" becoming a hit.

Subsequently, Sittisak was unable to relocate to Bangkok to pursue further education with the other members. As a result, The Innocent had to search for a new bassist and discovered Seni Chatwichai, who was then performing as an electone player and lead vocalist at Nana Cafe on Soi Nana. The band then approached him to join as their new bassist.

During this era, the five members of The Innocent consisted of:

• Peerasant Chuab-samai — keyboards

• Saichon Radomkij — lead vocals

• Kriengsak Jongthiratham — drums

• Seni Chatwichai — bass guitar

• Patipan Suksutthi — guitars

However, the band was unsatisfied with their traditional folk-song and string combo style, which they felt was becoming outdated. Meanwhile, pop-rock music was gaining immense popularity among teenagers worldwide, including in Thailand. This genre featured modern instrumentation such as keyboards, synthesizers, electronic drums, and at least two guitars. Consequently, the band conceived the idea to transition their style and musical direction toward this trend.

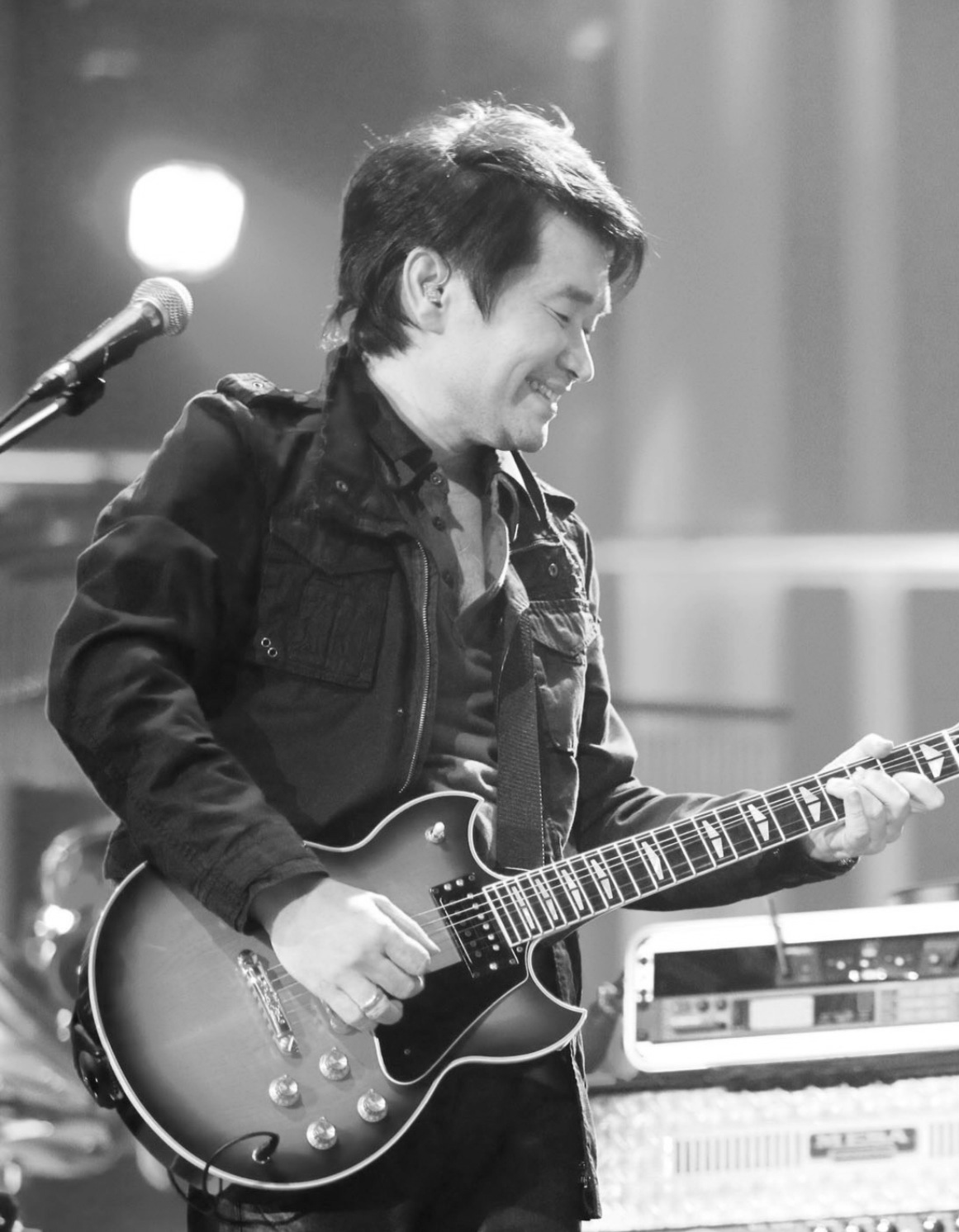
Chatree Kongsuwan

Peerasant then thought of a senior alumnus who was a school musician and guitarist, and invited him to join The Innocent. This member was Chatree Kongsuwan, who was then a member of Four Singles, a local band from Ratchaburi Province, and had previously recorded an album with the band Romantic. Chatree ultimately agreed to join the band.

After completing the new lineup, the band began working on their new studio album, Yu Hor (อยู่หอ). The album was well-received, significantly expanding The Innocent's fanbase through a pop-rock sound that aligned with the era's musical trends. Chatree played a pivotal role in the musical production of this album, allowing fans to witness the members' musical development, which became more robust and sophisticated.

Shortly after, Patipan resigned from the band, leaving the lineup with only five members and Chatree as the sole guitarist. In early 1983, The Innocent began working on a new studio album titled Piang Krasip (เพียงกระซิบ). The recording process took four full months, and the album was released on April 29, 1983. It received an overwhelming response from fans due to its meticulous production, as well as the noticeably intensified musical arrangements and vocal styles. Following the promotional concert tour for this album, Kriengsak resigned from the band to become the drummer for Intanin, replacing Thawee Sripradit, who transitioned to working behind the scenes and producing music for his own project. Some members of Intanin later went on to form the band Rainbow.

The period between 1983 and 1985 was considered the golden era of The Innocent, during which they consistently and continuously produced music in the studio. This followed the arrival of new members, including Chairat Patimapakorn on keyboards, recruited because the band required an additional keyboardist, and Kiattisak Yantaraprakorn, who replaced Kriengsak as the drummer. The band chose Kiattisak after recognizing his proficiency in electronic drums and percussion, as well as his studio recording expertise.

Their subsequent releases were the albums Rak Khue Arai (รักคืออะไร, 1984) and Lok Bai Kao (โลกใบเก่า, 1985). Both albums featured popular tracks such as 'Rak Khue Arai', 'Sak Wan', 'Thang Nueng Sueng Wang', 'Piang Khrueng Jai', and 'Num Khang Pee'. This continuous stream of commercial success solidified this period as the band's golden era. Concurrently, music critics in Thailand began to increasingly recognize the band's musical craftsmanship and lyrical content. Critics praised The Innocent for their advanced musical development compared to contemporary string combo bands, as the band members wrote, arranged, performed on stage, and recorded all of their music themselves. Notably, the album Lok Bai Kao received positive reviews from Khunthong Asunee Na Ayutthaya, a columnist for Quiet Storm, a prominent music magazine of that era.

In 1986, Kiattisak and Chairat resigned from the band, reducing the core lineup to just four members. Consequently, their studio workflow shifted from recording live electronic drums to using a drum machine instead, with no new permanent members added to the roster. For live performances, the band utilized guest musicians, including Sirisak Nantasen (later known as Tik Shiro) on drums, alongside Chokchai Phakphu and Aphichai Yenphunsuk on keyboards.

In the same year, The Innocent released a new album titled Khrang Ni Khong Phi Kap Nong (ครั้งนี้ของพี่กับน้อง), which achieved commercial success and featured several tracks that remain popular today, including 'Fan Lae Fai', 'Fak Rak', 'Dara TV', and 'Mue Thi Sam'. The track 'Mue Thi Sam' notably garnered significant attention from music listeners as it highlighted musical instrumentation, a jam session, and improvisation during the recording process, contrasting sharply with the band's previous musical style.

For this album, the band invited Vorasit Cheepsathit to serve as a guest vocalist and provide backing vocals on several tracks. Notably, the song 'Fak Rak', performed by Vorasit, became immensely popular and later came to be recognized as his signature song. Furthermore, with their growing musical maturity over time, individual members began to be increasingly approached to participate in studio recordings and musical collaborations for other projects.

Following the conclusion of the promotional period for the album Khrang Ni Khong Phi Kap Nong later that year, The Innocent went on a hiatus from producing music together due to the members' individual personal obligations. However, the members remained in contact and maintained the intention to eventually resume producing music in the signature style of The Innocent.

During their two-year hiatus, the members of The Innocent accumulated further musical experience, including collaborating with Rewat Buddhinan and Danupol Kaewkarn. Chatree worked as a music producer for Grammy Entertainment, while Peerasant arranged music and handled studio recordings. Meanwhile, Seni served as a backup musician for various artists, such as the band Chaliang.

In early 1989, the band released 10 Nalika (10 นาฬิกา), their first studio album in three years. The release introduced new musical styles that adapted to contemporary trends of the era, particularly a pop-rock sound that fans favored and had not heard from the band for a long time. Consequently, tracks from this album, such as 'Sia Wela Plao', 'Hen Jai Kan Noi', and 'Phrao Thoe Rue Plao', became highly popular.

For this album, The Innocent maintained their core lineup of four members, with Robert Dila joining as an associated touring member in the position of drummer for the concert tour.

The album 10 Nalika received favorable reviews in terms of its musical quality. Music critics from various magazines praised the album for successfully transforming The Innocent's image from a teen-favorite student band into a fully-fledged rock band that focused entirely on musical substance.

=== Hiatus and post-band careers ===
Driven by the popularity of the album 10 Nalika, The Innocent embarked on their most extensive concert tour since the band's inception. Following the conclusion of the tour, the core members separated to pursue their individual personal obligations. However, the band never officially disbanded.

Chatree Kongsuwan worked extensively in studio recording and music production for numerous artists under GMM Grammy. He also served as an executive for RPG Records, a subsidiary of GMM Grammy, before resigning to establish his own independent record labels and production houses, Craftsman Records and Mister Music. Chatree continued to work as a songwriter, producer, and music director for the reality television show True Academy Fantasia. In early 2008, he released his debut solo album, Into The Light, which achieved critical success, winning Best Male Solo Artist and Best Album at the 21st Season Awards for the year 2008.

Peerasant Chuabsamai transitioned behind the scenes as a songwriter for various artists, as well as a composer for commercial jingles and film scores. He later released the studio album Together as a producer and primary songwriter for the entire album. The project featured numerous guest vocalists, including Paiboonkiat Kieu-kaew on 'Rak Thoe Thuk Wan', Rosemary Kahanding on 'Jai Pen Khong Thoe', Sobchai Kraiyoonsen on 'Luem', the band Pong Pong on 'Rak Kao Kao', and Saichon Radomkij on 'Duerk Kor Klub'.

Saichon Radomkij pursued a career as a solo artist under Bakery Music, releasing the album A Touch of the Innocent in 1996. The album featured rearranged tracks of The Innocent's classic songs and was produced by Boyd Kosiyabong. In 1998, Saichon released another solo album titled Portrait of the Innocent, which consisted of cover versions of older songs from Bakery Music's catalog. This second album was produced by Peerasant Chuabsamai following an invitation from Boyd Kosiyabong, who had been a dedicated fan of The Innocent since his youth. Saichon later transitioned into artist management for Bakery Music, which has since evolved into LOVEiS Entertainment.

Seni Chatwichai shifted his focus toward private business ventures while continuing to perform and sing on occasion.
