= Phrik Kee Noo =

Studio album by Thongchai McIntyre
- Released: 6 March 1991
- Recorded: 1991
- Genres: String, Pop
- Label: Grammy Entertainment
- Producer: Somchai Kritsanaseranee

Thongchai McIntyre chronology
Boomerang (1990)	Phrik Kee Noo (1991)	Tor Thong (1994)

Phrik Kee Noo (Thai: พริกขี้หนู) is the sixth studio album by Thai recording artist Thongchai McIntyre, released on March 6, 1991. Under the label of Grammy Entertainment, produced by Somchai Kritsanaseranee, it contains 11 songs, which have sold a total of more than 3.5 million copies and is considered the best album of the 1990s. This is another Bird album with the highest sales. The entertainment media has called it the "Bird Fever" phenomenon for him once again. With hit songs such as "Phrik Kee Noo", "Ya Tor Rong Hua Jai", and "Khor Um Noi", it is a famous album that was made after Boomerang. Due to the success of the album, the album launch concert "Phrik Kee Noo" was organized. It was the first time to move to Indoor Stadium Huamark to accommodate the increased audience with 2 rounds. This was continued in the same year with the 5th Babb Bird Bird Show concert, titled "Happiness, Memories, Never Ending". There were 29 rounds and 58,000 audiences, which was the highest number of rounds in the history of a concert held at the Thailand Cultural Centre. It was also the last concert before Bird temporarily took a break from the entertainment industry for 2 years (from the end of 1991 to 1993). Similarly, the album "Phrik Kee Noo" was the last album during that period before the release of a new album that was 3 years apart.
