= Choot Rub Kaek =

Studio album by Thongchai McIntyre
- Released: 5 November 2002
- Recorded: 2002
- Genres: Thai pop music; Luk thung
- Length: 55:16
- Language: Thai
- Label: GMM Grammy
- Producers: Chatchai Chabamnet; Thanawat Seupsuwan; Busaba Daoreuang; Don Phadungwichian

Thongchai McIntyre chronology
Smile Club (2001)	Choot Rub Kaek (2002)	Bird Volume 1 (2005)

Singles from Choot Rub Kaek
- 1. "Fan Ja" Released: October 11, 2002; 2. "Mah Thammai" Released: October 11, 2002

Fan Ja... Sanit Gun Laew Ja

Choot Rub Kaek (Thai: ชุดรับแขก, English: Set For Guest) is the twelfth studio album by Thongchai McIntyre with Jintara Poonlarp, Nat Myria, and Katreeya English. This record album was released on November 5, 2002. The album has sold over 5 million copies (CD and Cassette Tape), the highest in Thailand. In addition, 3 millions copies of live concert VCDs for the album were sold.

Promoted singles from the album include Fan Ja, Ma Thammai, and Sawatdee Pee Mai.

From the popularity for this album, Thongchai also released a special album Fan Ja... Sanit Gun Laew Ja in March 2003, with a total of 800,000 sales.

== Track listing ==
Choot Rub Kaek
No.	Title	Lyrics	Music	Arrangement	Length
1.	"Fan Ja (with Jintara, Nat, and Kat)" (แฟนจ๋า, Hey Dear)	Joey Boy	Joey Boy	Suburbian; Chatchai Chabamnet	4:47
2.	"Ma Thammai (with Jintara)" (มาทำไม, Why Did You Come?)	C. Chabamnet	C. Chabamnet	C. Chabamnet	4:32
3.	"Roo Mai (Wah Chun Kid Teung)" (รู้ไหม (ว่าฉันคิดถึง), Do You Know (That I Miss You))	Kornkawee	Kornkawee	Weeraphat Eung-amporn	3:17
4.	"Chart Gaun Malee... Chart Nee Carol" (ชาติก่อนมาลี...ชาตินี้แครอน, Before You Were Malee, Now You're Carol)	C. Chabamnet	C. Chabamnet	C. Chabamnet	4:27
5.	"Yang Raeng" (อย่างแรง, Like Crazy)	C. Chabamnet	C. Chabamnet	C. Chabamnet	4:09
6.	"Kaew Ta-Kaew Toh" (แก้วตา - แก้วโตว, My Beloved)	C. Chabamnet	C. Chabamnet; Montree Tramote (ลาวกระทบไม้ Sample)	C. Chabamnet	3:57
7.	"Yahk Pen Fan Ter" (อยากเป็นแฟนเธอ, I Want To Be Your Love)	Setthakarn	Setthakarn	Setthakarn	4:31
8.	"Taung Tot Dao" (ต้องโทษดาว, Blame the Stars)	Pieng Or	Wutthikrai Imcharoen	C. Chabamnet	4:02
9.	"Ten Ram Tum Krua" (เต้นรำทำครัว, Cooking and Dancing)	C. Chabamnet	C. Chabamnet	C. Chabamnet	4:25
10.	"Bahn Kaung Rao" (บ้านของเรา, Our Home)	Piti Limcharoen	Piti Limcharoen	Weeraphat Eung-amporn	3:08
11.	"Fan Ja REMIX" (แฟนจ๋า, Hey Dear)			C. Chabamnet	5:18
12.	"Sawatdee Pee Mai" (สวัสดีปีใหม่, Happy New Year)	Jakkrawat Sawaengporn	Jakkrawat Sawaengporn	C. Chabamnet	3:39
Total length:					50:15

== Awards ==
- 2002 - Hamburger Awards
- 2003 - Channel [V] music awards
- 2004 - Top Awards
