= Simply Bird =

Studio album by Thongchai McIntyre
- Released: 26 November 2007 (Thailand)
- Recorded: 2007
- Genre: T-pop; R&B; hip hop; pop rock
- Language: Thai
- Label: GMM Grammy

Thongchai McIntyre chronology
Thongchai Village (2006)	Simply Bird (2007)	Asa Sanuk (2010)

Simply Bird (Thai: ซิมพลีย์ เบิร์ด) is the fifteenth studio album by Thai recording artist Thongchai McIntyre. The album was released on 26 November 2007 by GMM Grammy.

Mostly songs in this album are smooth and midpaced, while some are faster. Further, various genres such as R&B, hip hop, pop/rock are explored.

== Songs in this album ==
1. "Chuay Rap Tee"
2. "Mee Tae Kid Tueng"
3. "Dtok Loom Rak Ter Took Wan"
4. "Song Kon Kam Rang Dee"
5. "Switch Tee Jai"
6. "Nam Ta"
7. "Kon Na Rak"
8. "Jub Jao"
9. "Rap Pak"
10. "Loke Bai Prod"
