= Don Sornrabiab =

Thai singer (1949–2026)

- ดอน สอนระเบียบ
- Born: Udon Sornrabiab; 27 June 1949; Nakhon Sawan, Thailand
- Died: 19 November 2026 (aged 77); Nakhon Sawan, Thailand
- Occupations: Singer; actor
- Years active: 1977–2003

Don Sornrabiab (Thai: ดอน สอนระเบียบ; born Udon Sornrabiab (Thai: อุดร สอนระเบียบ); 27 June 1949 – 19 November 2026) was a Thai singer and actor for the Nititad Promotion label. He became popular during the 1970s and the 1980s. He was often called แมวเก้าชีวีต, which means a cat with nine lives.

== Biography ==
Don Sornrabiab was born on 27 June 1949, in Nakhon Sawan, Thailand. His family has an ancestry from Bangkok. He completed his secondary school at Santirat Witthayalai School. Before starting his singing career, Sornrabiab entered a music band as a drummer for P.M. Pocket Music, a band led by Payong Mukda, 1991 Thai National Artist.

Sornrabiab started his singing career as an artist under Nititad Promotion, founded by Wichian Asawasivakul. He became successful with his popular songs. Some of them were featured with Thai lyrics adapted from Japanese and Western songs including "เก้าล้านหยดน้ำตา" which used the melody of "9,999,999 Tears" by Dickey Lee, "ดา ดา ดา" which used the melody of "Da Da Da" by Trio, and "ร้ายนักรักนี่" which used the melody of "The End of the World" by Skeeter Davis.

== Personal life and death ==
Sornrabiab was married to his first wife Lek. They had three children together. One of their children, Noppadol, died on 18 October 2019 at the age of 40 from flu. Sornrabiab later divorced his first wife and then married his second wife, Wanna Iammongkol. They had one daughter named Nantida.

In 1996, Sornrabiab became unconscious and was hospitalized, where he was diagnosed with a stroke. After undergoing treatment for three months, he recovered and continued his singing career. However, on 16 September 2003, he was hospitalized again after suffering another stroke, which left him with left-sided paralysis. He remained bedridden until his death at his residence in Nakhon Sawan province on 19 November 2026, at 12:30 a.m.
