= Too Much So Much Very Much =

Single by Thongchai McIntyre

from the album Asa Sanook
- Language: Thai; English
- Released: December 15, 2010
- Genre: Dance pop; R&B; Hip hop
- Length: 4:14
- Label: GMM Grammy
- Lyricist: Joey Boy
- Producers: Busaba Daorueang; Thanawat Suepsawan

"Too Much So Much Very Much" is a song by Thongchai McIntyre and was released in 2011 as the third single from the album Asa Sanook. The lyrics were written by Joey Boy and the music and arrangement were by Thana Lawasut.

In 2012, the copyright was bought from a record label in Japan and the lyrics were translated into Japanese and sung by a girl group called Berryz Koubou.

== Charts ==
Chart (2011)	Peak position
SIAM TOP 100 Year End Chart 2011	1
GMM Gmember Top 20 Chart	2
Grammy Best of the Year 2011	1
95.5 Virgin Hitz TOP 40 CHART	10
Seed Chart Top 20 (97.5 FM)	3
Intensive Watch Music Chart 2011	10
94 EFM Top Chart	1
Hot FM Top 20 Chart (91.5 FM)	1
Thailand People's Chart	1

== Awards ==
- 2011 – "Bang Awards-Too Much So Much Very Much" song from the Bang Awards announcement of Bang Channel on May 31, 2011.
- 2011 – "Most Popular Music Video" Award for the song Too Much So Much Very Much from Channel[V] Music Thailand on September 3, 2011.
