= Paiboon Damrongchaitham =

Thai businessman

- ไพบูลย์ ดำรงชัยธรรม
- Born: May 27, 1949 (age 77)
- Education: Faculty of Communication Arts Chulalongkorn University
- Occupation: businessman
- Known for: Co-founder of GMM Grammy
- Children: 4

Paiboon Damrongchaitham (Thai: ไพบูลย์ ดำรงชัยธรรม; born 27 May 1949) is a Thai businessman of Chinese descent. He is a co-founder of Grammy Entertainment (currently GMM Grammy) together with Rewat Buddhinan.

== Early life ==
Paiboon was born on May 27, 1949, in an overseas Chinese family, who operated a small grocery store in Yaowarat. He graduated from secondary school at Suankularb Wittayalai School then continued to higher education as the 4th class of the Faculty of Communication Arts Chulalongkorn University.

In 1972, Paiboon started working at Far East Advertising Co., Ltd. in the Saha Pathana Phibul group. This allowed him the opportunity to learn from Dr. Thiam Chokwatana, who was the company's chairman at the time. In 1977, he and some of his colleagues resigned to work at Premier Marketing Co., Ltd. in the Osotspa group for 7 years.

Paiboon is married to Mae Damrongchaitham, a Taiwanese real estate businesswoman.They have 4 children together, 2 sons are Fah Mai (currently Chief Strategy Officer - Music Business 1 of GMM Grammy) and Rafa (currently Chief Marketing Officer of The One Enterprises Public Company Limited) and 2 daughters, Ingfah and Fahchai. Incidentally, Paiboon is the person applying for registration of establishment Damrongchaitham Foundation to provide educational opportunities for Thai children who lack opportunities, including sending students who have very good academic results to study abroad as well.

=== GMM Grammy ===
In 1983, Paiboon brought the accumulated money around 400,000-500,000 baht as the registered capital to establish Grammy Entertainment Co., Ltd. on November 11 to produce music and then record it for sale (music label) in collaboration with Rewat Buddhinan the singer musician and ex-the Impossibles band members.

which the first licensed work of Grammy is the production of a set of songs Thai Maha Music (มหาดุริยางค์ไทย) authored by Luang Pradit Pairoh. Then in 1995, Grammy raised public funds and was listed on the Stock Exchange of Thailand and changed its name to Grammy Entertainment Public Company Limited until 2001, the company changed its name again to GMM Grammy Public Company Limited, which is used today.

Paiboon became the Chairman of the Board after Rewat's death from cancer in 1996 and is the largest shareholder of GMM Grammy with a total of 392,834,599 shares, representing 47.91%, but Paiboon and all 4 children have company restructured by transferring all the shares that all 5 people hold in GMM Grammy, a total of 50.25%, to Fah Damrongchaitham Company, which the family established as a shareholder instead. Paiboon still has a majority vote with 99% of shares held in Fah Damrongchaitham Co., Ltd., while the other 1% Paiboon allows all 4 children to hold equally at 0.25% each because Paiboon is getting older, and wants to allocate his personal assets to be the family's center assets. Including setting up a family constitution to clearly divide administrative duties in GMM Grammy.
