= Thongchai McIntyre =

Thai singer and actor (born 1958)

Thongchai McIntyre TCh RNgBh
- ธงไชย แมคอินไตย์
- McIntyre in 2023
- Born: Albert McIntyre; 8 December 1958 (age 67); Phasi Charoen, Bangkok, Thailand
- Other name: Bird
- Education: High Vocational Certificate
- Alma mater: Thonburi Commercial College
- Occupations: Actor; singer
- Years active: 1983–present
- Height: 1.78 m (5 ft 10 in)
- Musical career
- Also known as: Bird Thongchai
- Genres: Dance-pop; electronica; electropop; pop; pop rock; R&B
- Label: GMM Music

Thongchai McIntyre (Thai: ธงไชย แมคอินไตย์, pronounced [tʰōŋ.tɕʰāj mɛ́k.ʔīn.tāj]; born Albert McIntyre on 8 December 1958) is a Thai singer, actor, and 2023-batch National Artist of Thailand. Nicknamed Bird (Thai: เบิร์ด, pronounced [bɤ́ːt]), he is among the most commercially successful singers in Thai music history, with over 25 million albums sold.

Thongchai holds the record for the most solo studio albums in Thailand to exceed one million copies in sales—seven albums, along with two additional special albums that also surpassed one million in sales. His most iconic milestones include the album Boomerang (1990), which made him the first GMM Grammy artist to sell over two million copies. That same year, he starred as Kobori in the drama Khu Kam (1990), which became the highest-rated Thai television drama at the time. This double success gave rise to what became known as the "Bird Fever" phenomenon, which significantly influenced both the music and television industries in Thailand.

Following this success was the album Prik Kee Noo (1991), which sold more than 3.5 million copies, becoming the best-selling Thai album of the 1990s. Later, the album Chud Rab Kaek (2002) achieved over five million in sales, setting the all-time record for album sales in Thailand.

== Early life ==
Thongchai McIntyre was born in Bangkok. His English name is Albert McIntyre, which led to his nickname "Bird". He is the ninth of ten children born to James (Jimmy) McIntyre, a medical corpsman in the Royal Thai Army of Scottish-Mon descent, and Udom McIntyre. He was raised in a relatively poor family. During his childhood, Thongchai helped support the household by folding paper bags, selling lottery tickets, collecting and selling milk cans, and sewing traditional hats. He also occasionally earned a small income by teaching English to children in the Bang Khae slum, receiving 5 to 10 baht depending on donations.

From a young age, he had a passion for singing and frequently participated in temple fair singing contests, occasionally winning prizes. He practiced singing with his family and was largely self-taught. Seven of his siblings were also musically talented, and together they formed a family band called "Mong Doo Lian".

Thongchai completed his primary education at Wat Nimmarnoradee School, where he volunteered to assist teachers with music and dance activities and was known for being cheerful and expressive. He later attended Panyaworakun School for secondary education and obtained a Higher Vocational Certificate (Por Wor Sor) in Management from Thonburi Commercial College.

After achieving widespread success in the entertainment industry, Thongchai was awarded two honorary degrees by Rajamangala University of Technology Thanyaburi. His first was an honorary bachelor's degree in Performing Arts and Music in 2002, followed by a Doctor of Education (Honoris Causa) in International Music Studies in 2022.

== Entertainment Industry ==
=== Early Days with GMM Grammy and Initial Acting Career ===
While Thongchai was working in the International Department of Kasikorn Bank, Tha Phra Branch, he also took on side jobs such as modeling, appearing in commercials, and working as a doorman at a discotheque called Flamingo at the Ambassador Hotel. There, he met drama producer Warayut Milinthachinda, who was a guest there. Thongchai entertained guests by singing and dancing, which led Warayut to invite him to act in the television drama Nam Tan Mai (1983). Adul Dulyarat served as his acting coach. This was Thongchai’s first acting role, and he was nominated for the Mekhala Award for Best Supporting Actor. As a result, he gained recognition and was acclaimed as a promising new actor.

Thongchai showed a natural talent for singing and participated in the Siam Kolakarn singing contest in 1984 — a significant milestone in his music career. In that competition, he received the "Outstanding Singer" award for his performance of the song "Cheewit Lakorn" (Life is a Drama), along with two additional special awards from the judging panel. His success in the contest led to a recording contract with Siam Kolakarn. Later, Rewat Buddhinan, founder of GMM Grammy, recognized Thongchai's potential and approached Khun Ying Porntip Narongdej, then managing director of Siam Kolakarn, to negotiate his transfer to GMM Grammy. This marked the beginning of Thongchai’s professional singing career with the label.

While waiting for the completion of his debut album—a process that took two years—Thongchai starred in his first leading film role in Duai Rak Kue Rak (1985), alongside Anchalee Jongkadeekij, directed by Mom Chao Thipyachat Chatchai. Their on-screen chemistry was noted by the press, making them one of the most iconic romantic pairs in classic Thai cinema. That same year, he also appeared in the television dramas Ban Soi Dao and Phlapphlung Si Chomphu, among others.

In 1986, Thongchai was selected to host the Miss Thailand pageant finals for both 1986 and 1987. He also became the first co-host of the live music program 7 See Concert with Mayura Thanabutr, forming a popular hosting duo. He won the Mekhala Award for Best Male Host that year.

That same year, he released his debut album, Hat Sai Sai Lom Song Rao, which was recognized as the best male artist album of the year. He also became the first male artist under Grammy to sell 500,000 cassette copies. The first song he recorded was "Phan Ma Phan Pai", followed by hit singles such as "Duai Rak Lae Phukphan", "Fak Fah Thalay Fan", and "Banthuek Na Sutthai", all of which gained widespread popularity. Due to the album’s success, many of its hit songs were later featured in the film Duai Rak Lae Phukphan, which was filmed in Switzerland.

Following this success, Thongchai resigned from his full-time job and officially entered the entertainment industry, with Pornpichit Patthanathabutr as his personal manager. He also held a concert to promote his debut album, titled Sud Cheewit Thongchai Concert. In the same year, the Babb Bird Bird Show No. 1 was launched, marking the first concert ever organized by GMM Grammy.

=== 1987–1996 ===
==== Album Sabai Sabai ====
In 1987, Thongchai released the hit album Sabai Sabai, which was named Album of the Year by his record label. Featuring several popular tracks, including "Sabai Sabai," "Muean Pen Khon Euen," and "Fak Jai Wai," the album retained the easy-listening style of his debut. It became the best-selling record of the year and played a major role in establishing Thongchai as one of Thailand’s top superstars. Its sales more than doubled those of his first album, and although it did not reach one million copies, it set a new standard for the Thai music industry with its high production quality and strong artistic performance, earning widespread acclaim from fans nationwide.

Thongchai's popularity extended beyond Thailand, as "Sabai Sabai" brought him international fame. The song was officially licensed and adapted into multiple languages, and was also featured in the film Rang Kha Daeng, in which Thongchai starred. The song won Best Original Song at the Golden Suphannahong Awards, presented by the Federation of National Film Associations of Thailand.

Later that year, he released the album Rap Kwan Wan Mai (Blessing for a New Day), a celebratory follow-up to Sabai Sabai, which included hit songs such as "Man Khoi Dulae Lae Raksa Duang Jai" and "Khob Jai Jing Jing." The album continued his success with several chart-topping tracks. In the same year, he also held his second Babb Bird Bird Show No. 2.

In early 1988, he held two major concerts: Kao Lao Thongchai (Mai Ngok) and Bird Pert-sa-kad Concert. He also released special albums including Thongchai McIntyre B.E. 2501 and Sor-Kor-Sor, which featured "Chap Mue Kan Wai", a signature track of the Babb Bird Bird Show. He also held the Babb Bird Bird Show No. 3 in early 1989.

==== Khu Kam Drama and Boomerang Album ====
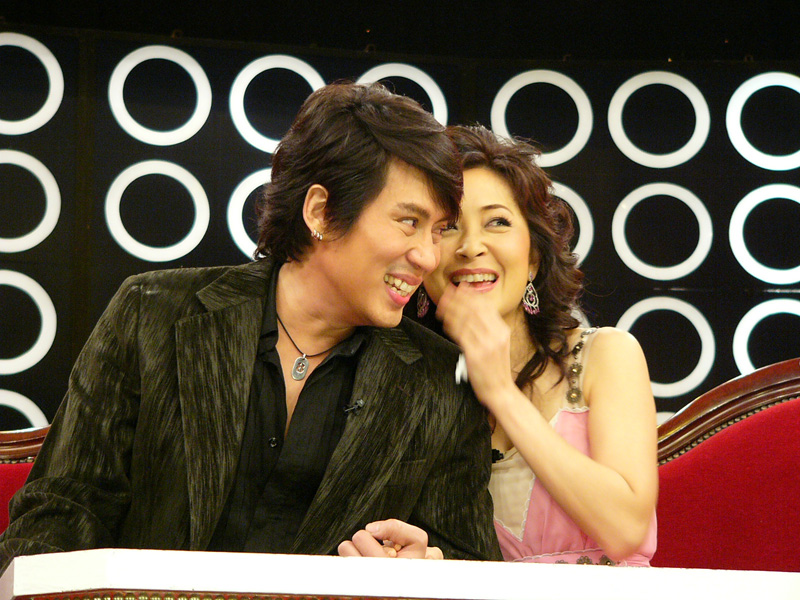
Thongchai and Kamolchanok Komoltithi, lead actors of Khu Kam, during a 2006 TV program recording

In 1990, during the height of the "Bird Fever" phenomenon—a term referring to the widespread popularity of Thongchai McIntyre—he starred as Kobori, a Japanese soldier stationed at a base in Thailand during World War II, in the drama Khu Kam. Kobori falls in love with a Thai plantation girl, played by Kamolchanok Komoltithi, in a romance marked by hardship and unfulfilled hopes. This adaptation became one of the most successful Thai dramas of all time, achieving a record-breaking rating of 40. For his performance, Thongchai received the Best Actor award at the 10th Mekhala Awards and the Best Leading Actor award at the 5th Golden Television Awards.

In the same year, Thongchai released the album Boomerang, marking a significant transformation in his public image. Transitioning from his previous easy-listening style, the album positioned him as a full-fledged pop artist. The title track, "Boomerang", conveyed the message of an artist who had never truly disappeared, likening him to a boomerang—the harder it is thrown, the faster it returns—mirroring the song’s lyrical theme.

The album became a cultural phenomenon for GMM Grammy, being named the label’s best album of the year and ranked third among the best albums of the decade. Thongchai also became the first GMM Grammy artist to surpass two million cassette sales, with total sales reaching nearly three million copies. Over one million were sold within the first six weeks of release.

The song "Khu Kat" from the album was translated into several Asian languages, including Chinese, Burmese, and Vietnamese. To promote the album, he held a launch concert titled Manoot Boomerang and subsequently embarked on a tour under the same name. That year also saw the staging of the Babb Bird Bird Show No. 4, held at the Thailand Cultural Center for 22 performances, drawing a total audience of 44,000. The guest performer for the show was Hatthaya Wongkrachang. Additionally, he participated in the Sai Jai Thai Concert No. 5 on 8 July 1990, during which Her Royal Highness Princess Maha Chakri Sirindhorn performed the trumpet part in the song "Khu Kat" while Thongchai provided the vocals.

==== Prik Kee Noo Album and Wannee Tee Rorkoi Drama ====
In 1991, Thongchai continued his commercial success with his sixth studio album, Prik Kee Noo, which sold over one million copies within 50 days and eventually surpassed 3.5 million copies in total. It became the best-selling album of the 1990s and was later recognized as the "Album of the Decade". Media outlets once again described this phenomenon as "Bird Fever". Popular tracks from the album included "Prik Kee Noo", "Khor Oom Noi", "Mai Art Yang Roo", and "Fak Wai". That same year, he also staged the Babb Bird Bird Show No. 5 concert, under the theme "Happiness and Memories That Never End", with 29 performances and a total audience of 58,000.

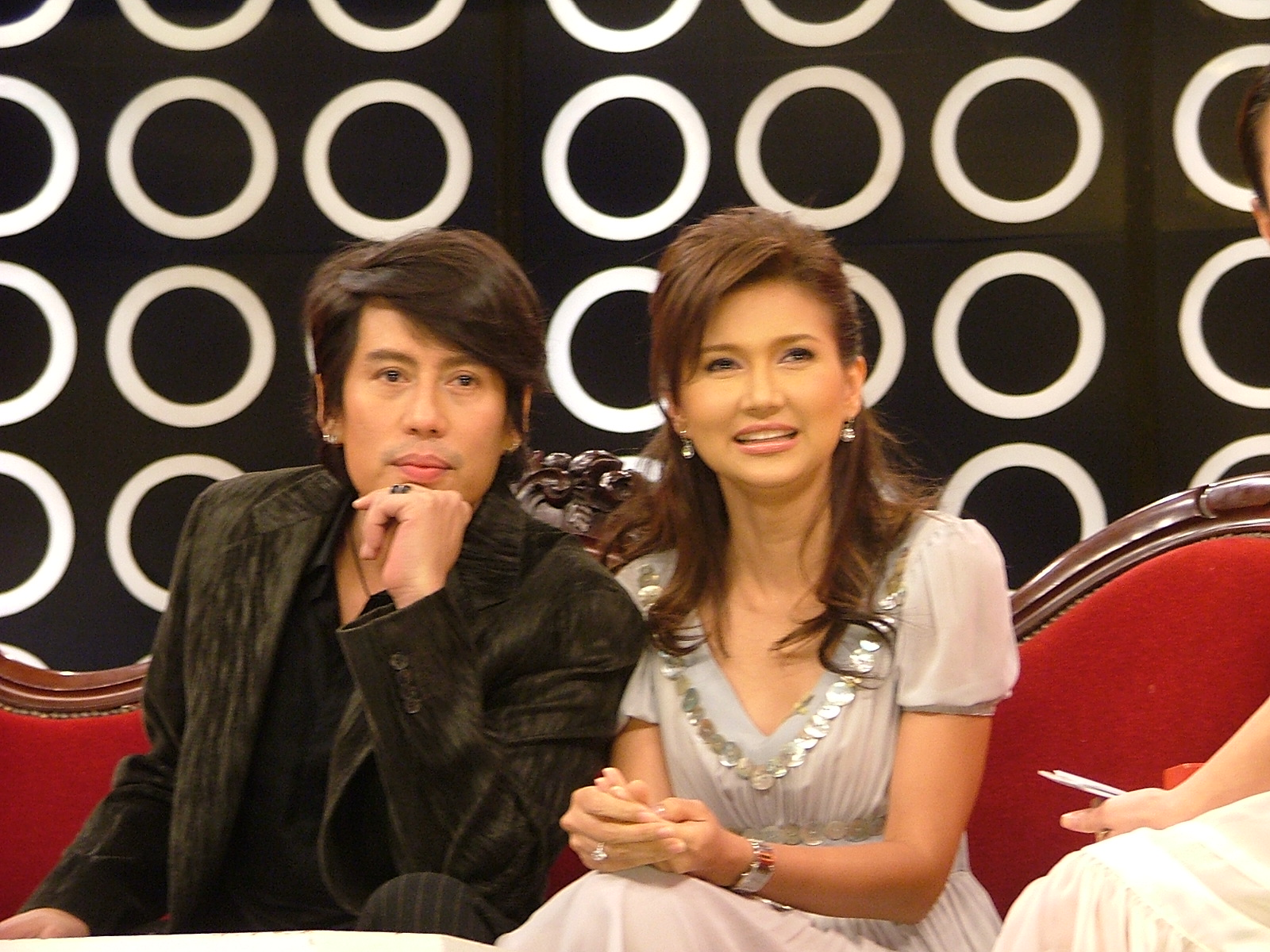
Thongchai and Sirium Pakdeedumrongrit, lead actors of Wun Nee Tee Ror Koi, during a 2006 TV program recording

At the end of 1993, he starred in the drama Wannee Tee Rorkoi, playing dual roles as Chao Sun and Prince Sikhonnarodom. The series was another major hit, earning him the Best Leading Actor award at the 8th TV Golden Awards.

In early 1994, he released the album Thor Thong, which included popular tracks such as "Ter Phu Mai Phae" and "Nueai Mai". The latter won the Best Lyric Composition Award at the Phra Phikanes Golden Awards. He also held an album launch concert titled Thor Thong Kub Ther (Nan Lae), followed by the Babb Bird Bird Show No. 6 concert.

In 1995, Thongchai reprised the role of Kobori in the film adaptation of Khu Kam. He was awarded Best Leading Actor at the 1995 Phra Surasawadee Royal Awards. That same year, he performed the song "Golden Stars" during the opening ceremony of the 18th SEA Games, held at the 700th Anniversary Chiang Mai Stadium.

=== 1997–2006 ===
==== Ordination and the Loss of His Mother ====
After completing the filming of the drama Niramit, Thongchai entered the monkhood on 8 December 1997, as an act of gratitude at Wat Phra Si Mahathat Wora Maha Viharn. He received his robes from Her Royal Highness Princess Soamsawali and the monastic requisites from Her Royal Highness Princess Ubolratana. He was given the monastic name "Apichayo", meaning "the one with great victory." He spent his monkhood in Chiang Mai province.

Between 1998 and 2001, Thongchai released three consecutive albums, each selling over one million copies. These included Thongchai Service (1998), which featured hit songs such as "Som Dai", "Bok Wa Ya Narak", "Kor Lerk Gun Laew", and "Tarn Fai Gao". That year also saw the release of a special album, Thongchai Service Special, the television drama Kwam Song Jum Mai Hua Jai Derm, and a series of concert performances.

In 1999, he released the album Tu-Pleng Saman Prajam Barn, which featured tracks like "Long Si Ja", "Glub Mai Dai Pai Mai Teung", "Pit Trong Nai", and "Tummai Tong Tur". During the same period, he also hosted the Babb Bird Bird Show No. 7 (2000) and released the compilation album 100 Pleng Ruk Mai Roo Job (100 Endless Love Songs).

Thongchai’s mother, Udom McIntyre, died in Chiang Rai province on 9 March 2001. The royal cremation ceremony was held on 31 July and was presided over by Her Royal Highness Princess Maha Chakri Sirindhorn, along with three other members of the royal family, who bestowed the cremation rites as a special honor.

Later that year, Thongchai released the album Smile Club, which his record label recognized as its best album of the year. The album featured popular tracks such as "Lao Soo Gun Fang", "Kon Mai Mee Faen", and "Khu Tae". The song "Lao Soo Gun Fang" received multiple accolades, including Best Song at the 14th Season Awards and Most Popular Male Artist Music Video at the inaugural Channel V Thailand Music Video Awards. A concert to launch the Bird Smile Club album was also held.

According to the 2001 annual public impression survey by ABAC Poll, and the annual survey by Suan Dusit Poll, Thongchai was named the most impressive Thai male singer of the year.

==== Honorary Degree and the Album Chud Rab Kaek ====
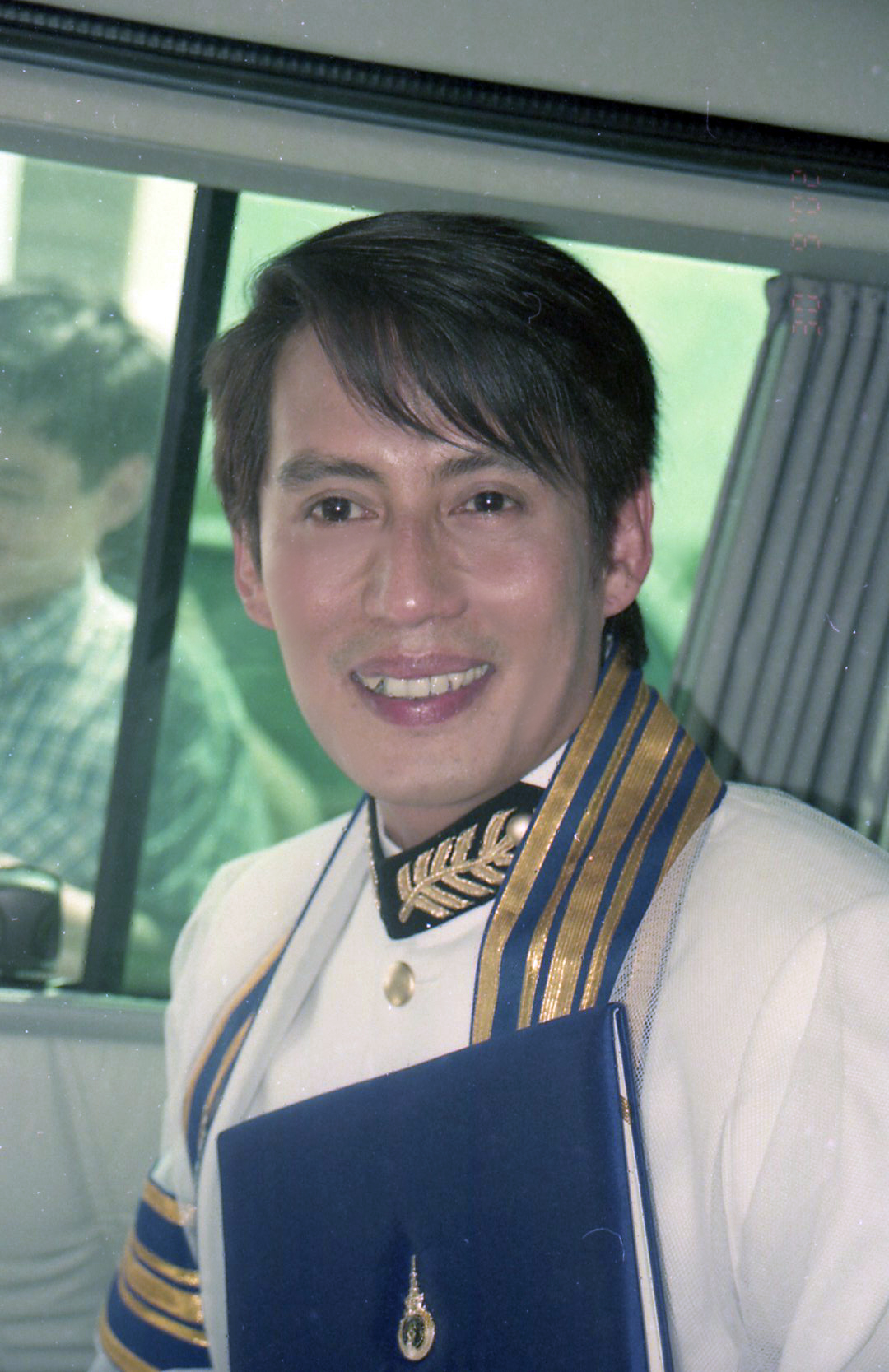
Thongchai at Rajamangala University of Technology Thanyaburi in 2002

In 2002, Thongchai was awarded an honorary degree by the Faculty of Performing Arts and Music at Rajamangala University of Technology Thanyaburi in recognition of his creative contributions to international music and his successful career.

From late 2002 to 2003, he released the album Chud Rab Kaek, which set a record for the highest cassette sales in Thailand, exceeding five million copies. The concert VCDs sold more than three million copies, with combined sales across cassette, CD, and VCD formats totaling over eight million units. Additionally, the album achieved a milestone for GMM Grammy by surpassing one million cassette sales within three weeks and over three million within two months, marking a historic achievement in Thai music history. The album featured popular tracks such as "Fan Ja", composed by Joey Boy. The song was particularly notable for its creative integration of lyrics in regional dialects representing the four main regions of Thailand. Thongchai McIntyre performed as a man from Central Thailand, Jintara Poonlarp represented Northeast Thailand (Isan), Katreeya English represented Northern Thailand, and Myria Benedetti represented Southern Thailand. This cultural and linguistic diversity contributed to the song's wide appeal and lasting popularity. Another hit from the album was "Ma Tummai", a duet with Jintara Poonlarp. According to a 2002 popularity survey conducted by Bangkok Poll, "Fan Ja" was the most popular song among Bangkok residents, followed by "Ma Tummai".

Following this success, a special edition album titled Fan Ja… Sanit Kan Laew Ja was released, along with a launch concert for the album For Fan and the For Fan Fun Fair concert. That same year, he also staged the Babb Bird Bird Show No. 8 and received multiple major awards from institutions including the Hamburger Awards, Top Awards, and Channel [V] Thailand Music Video Awards.

In 2004, Thongchai performed "Fan Ja" at an international awards ceremony and was named Favorite Artist Thailand at the third MTV Asia Awards held in Singapore.

==== Bird-Sek Album and Volume 1 ====
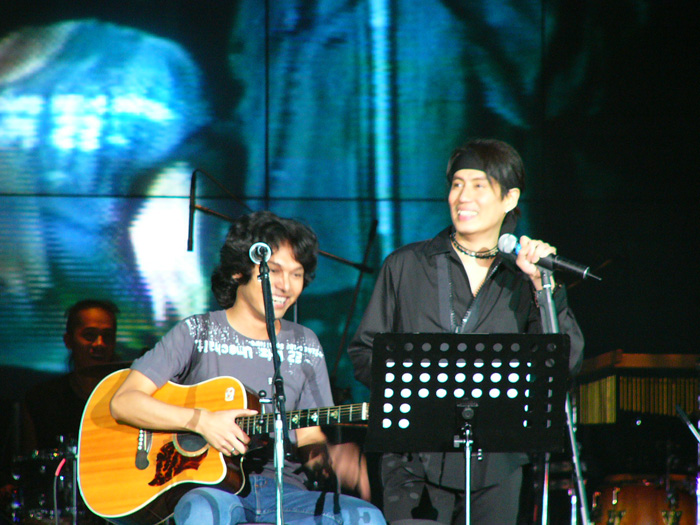
Concert Bird Zon: Bird-Sek, 2004

In 2004, he released the album Bird–Sek, a special album commemorating the 20th anniversary of GMM Grammy. The project featured a rock duo concept in collaboration with rock singer Seksan Sukpimai, marking a shift from his usual soft vocal style to a more rock-oriented sound. The album’s most notable track was Om Phra Ma Phut (a Thai idiom meaning an untrusted sacred oath). It became the best-selling album of the year, with sales exceeding two million copies. GMM Grammy described it as "the best special album of the era".That same year, he held the concert Bird Zon Bird–Sek, with two performances at Impact Arena featuring guest artist Palmy. He also embarked on a regional tour with performances in Khon Kaen, Surat Thani, Chiang Mai, and concluded with a final show in Bangkok. According to a Suan Dusit Poll, he was voted the most popular male Thai pop singer among the public.

In 2005, he released the album Volume 1, which included popular songs such as "Oh La Nor... My Love" and "Mai Kaeng Ying Phae" (Not Competing Means Losing). He received the Best Male Singer awards from both Top Awards and Oops! Awards, and was named Thai Artist of the Year at the Chalermthai Awards. The music video for "Oh La Nor... My Love" received the Music Video of the Year award from the FAT Awards and was also named the Most Popular Music Video at the Music Video Awards. According to a survey conducted by ABAC Poll, "Oh La Nor... My Love" was voted Best Song of the Year. Thongchai also held a major concert titled Volume 1: Oh La Nor... My Love. Both ABAC Poll and Suan Dusit Poll reported that he remained the most popular male singer in Thailand that year.

In 2006, he released the album Thongchai Village, which included the popular track "Thiang Kan Thammai" (Why Argue?) and a special album series titled Bird Pern Floor, released in three volumes. That year, The Nation (Thailand) newspaper named him one of the "35 Most Influential Thais in the Past 35 Years". In addition, Siam Rath newspaper listed him among the most influential Thai figures of 2006, ranking him 26th overall and 1st among singers and actors. He also received the Inspiration Award at the MTV Asia Awards, the Most Successful Artist of the Year award from the Virgin Hitz Awards, and the Popular Male Artist Certificate of Honor from Thailand Top Chart.

=== 2007–2016 ===
==== Concerts and the album Asa Sanook ====
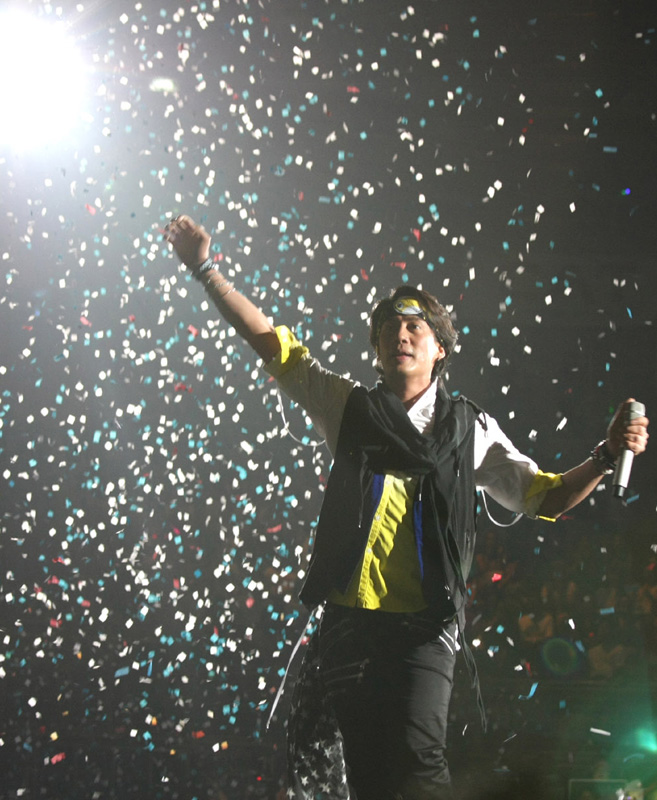
Thongchai in Babb Bird Bird Show No. 9 (2008)

In 2007, Thongchai held the Bird Perd Floor concert, and later that year released the album Simply Bird, which included popular songs such as "Chuaay Rap Tee," "Mee Tae Kid Tueng," and "Namta." The song "Namta," written by Apivatch Eutthavornsuk, received the Best Song award from the Season Awards, while "Mee Tae Kid Tueng," written by Nitipong Honark, received honorable mention for excellence in Thai language lyrics.

In 2008, Thongchai performed in the Babb Bird Bird Show No. 9, titled Magic Memories: The Miracle of Memories That Is Us... Forever, which drew a total audience of 120,000 people across 12 shows. In 2009, he was selected on two occasions to serve as a presenter for the Tourism Authority of Thailand, leading campaigns titled "Teaw Thai Kruek Khruen Setthakit Thai Khuek Khak" and "12 Months 7 Stars 9 Suns," and performed the promotional theme song "Pai Teaw Gun." That same year, he also released the special single "Ja Dai Mai Luem Gun" as part of the soundtrack for the film Short Memory... Long Love, and staged the concert Thongchai Fancy Fanson... Rong Ten Len Taeng Tua in four performances.

In 2010, Thongchai released the album Asa Sanook, his first full-length studio album in three years, which recorded the highest sales and digital downloads of the year. The album featured popular tracks such as "Yuu Khon Diao," "Yaa Tham Yang Nee Mai Waa Kab Khrai... Khao Jai Mai," "Too Much So Much Very Much," and "Rao Ma Sing." The latter two songs were later licensed and adapted into Japanese-language versions.

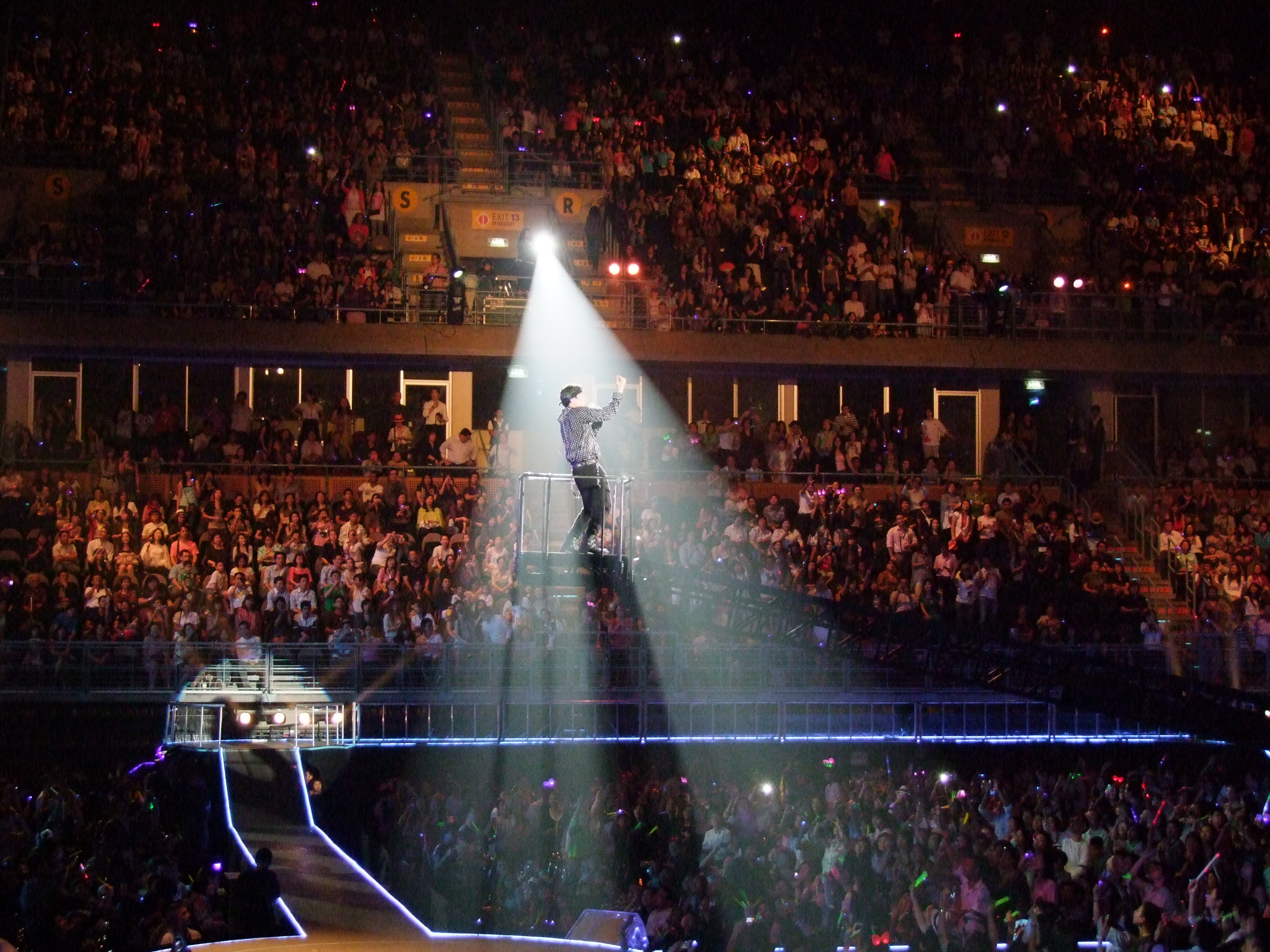
Thongchai in the Bird Asa Sanook concert (2011)

In 2011, he staged the major concert Bird Asa Sanook at Impact Arena, Muang Thong Thani, which was recognized as one of the most notable concerts of the year. That year, Thongchai was also selected as the character for the animated series Birdland Daen Mahatsachan (Birdland, the Land of Wonders), for which he provided the voice of the character "Pee Bird" and performed the series’ theme song. Additionally, he recorded the special Japanese-language charity single "Thai for Japan," dedicated to the victims of the 2011 Tōhoku earthquake and tsunami.

In 2012, he performed in the Babb Bird Bird Show No. 10, titled "Wan Khong Rao: Young Yoo," commemorating the 25th anniversary of the Babb Bird Bird concert series. The event sold over 100,000 tickets in a single release. The following year, he took part in the Khon Nok Kab Dok Mai Concert No. 2: Secret Garden (Feathers and Flowers: Secret Garden).

==== Strengthening Relations with Japan and Neighboring Countries ====
In 2013, Thongchai was invited to serve as an "International Friendship Ambassador" at the 64th Sapporo Snow Festival in Sapporo, Hokkaido Prefecture, Japan. A life-sized snow sculpture of him was featured at the event as a symbol of the strong friendship between Thailand and Japan. A survey conducted in Japan found him to be the most well-known Thai artist among the Japanese public.

That same year, he was invited to perform at the "ASEAN-Japan Music Fair" in Tokyo. The Japan National Tourism Organization also invited him to participate in a promotional photo campaign held in Okinawa, Yokohama, and Fukuoka to support Japanese tourism.

In 2014, Thongchai received a "Special Award" from the Japan National Tourism Organization (JNTO) at the Japan Tourism Award in Thailand, recognizing his significant contributions to Japan’s tourism image. That year, he also appeared in the television drama Kol Kimono.

In 2015, he performed in the Khon Nok Kab Dok Mai: The Original Returns concert, the third installment of the series. GMM Grammy also organized the "FUN & FRIENDSHIP EXPERIENCE," a cultural exchange initiative aimed at strengthening Thai–Myanmar relations. He received a warm welcome from numerous fans in Myanmar.

In 2016, Thongchai held the Ruam Wong Thongchai Concert and participated in a special short film project titled "Rak Kham Diao: Pharakit Kluk Fun" (One Love: The Dusty Mission).

=== 2017 – present ===
==== Tribute Performance to the King ====
Thongchai is regarded as the last artist to perform a royal tribute song to King Rama IX, having sung the song "The Reason of the Father," which was released on 11 October 2016, just two days before the death of King Rama IX. After this event, Thongchai took part in several royal tribute projects. In November 2016, he appeared as a guest actor in the special drama We Were Born in the Reign of Rama IX The Series, portraying a volunteer doctor. In 2017, he was a guest singer at the concert Our Land. On 26 October that year, he was among a few artists who attended the royal cremation ceremony of King Rama IX as a civilian in an official attendance role.

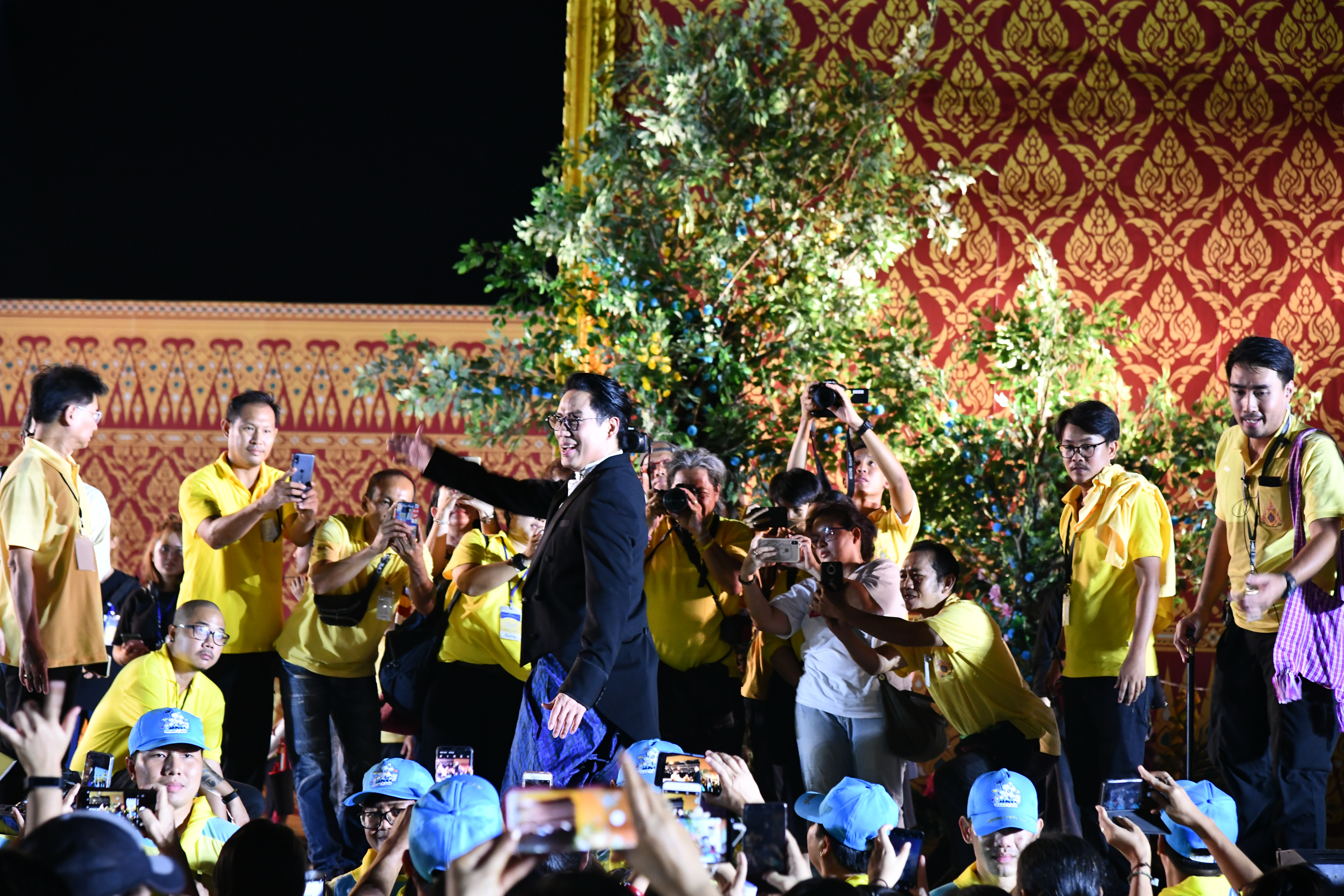
Thongchai performing at the 2019 Royal Coronation Celebration at Sanam Luang

In May 2019, he was invited to perform in the play In the Dream Garden, United in Loyal Devotion at the 2019 Royal Coronation celebrations of King Rama X at Sanam Luang. He performed the traditional Thai song "Lao Kham Hom." The month prior, he contributed vocals to the special song "Volunteer Spirit (จิตอาสา)," produced by GMM Grammy, which encouraged Thais to do good deeds by volunteering for social and national development, continuing the royal initiatives of King Rama X.

==== Special Projects, Major Concerts, and Recent Works ====
In early 2018, Thongchai launched a special project titled Bird Mini Marathon, collaborating with eight emerging artists. That same year, he received the honorary Joox Icon Award for Lifetime Achievement Artist at the 2018 JOOX Thailand Music Awards. He also held his Babb Bird Bird Show No. 11 concert, titled DREAM JOURNEY, at IMPACT Arena, which continued into 2019. The concert series totaled seven shows. Additionally, he held three more shows under the Singing Bird concert series, which took place at Royal Paragon Hall.

In 2021, he joined the "Power from the Sky Hospital" project, promoting clean energy for 77 hospitals across Thailand. The project was organized by the Energy Regulatory Commission in 2020. He participated by performing the song "Let the World See (Thai Kindness)." This song earned him the Outstanding Singing Award in Thai Language for the Male Vocal Performance in Thai Pop Music category at the 2021 National Thai Language Day. The award was presented by the Department of Literature and History, Fine Arts Department, Ministry of Culture.

Later that year, he released the song "Who Misses You," the soundtrack for the drama Wiman Sai, and the song "Every Day, Is It Possible," a with Naphasin Saengsuwan (Noom, formerly of Kala). He was subsequently honored with the Lifetime Achievement Award for his long-standing success and inspirational influence in the music industry at the TOTY Music Awards 2021.

In 2022, he released a new album titled Bird Twenty-Two, featuring singles such as "Pleng Thi Mai Mi Khrai Fang", and music videos for "Ma Kong Ruam Kan Trong Ni", "Lamyai Longkong", and "Thot Long Chai".

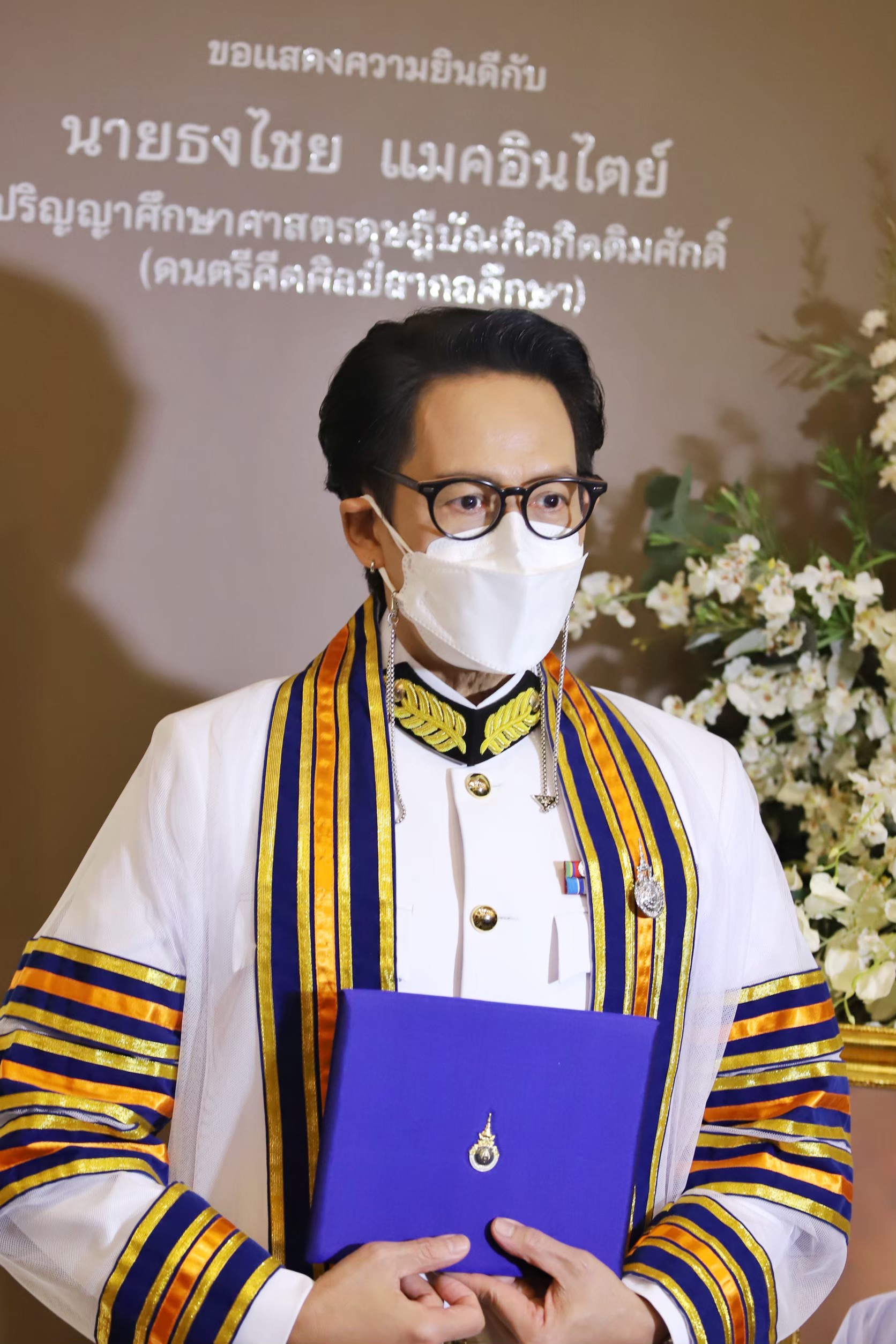
Thongchai McIntyre receiving an honorary doctorate

==== Honorary Doctorate ====
In 2022, he was awarded an Honorary Doctorate in Education (Western Music Studies) by Her Royal Highness Princess Maha Chakri Sirindhorn during the 2020 academic year graduation ceremony at Rajamangala University of Technology Thanyaburi, held on 21 March.

In August, he received the Outstanding Contributor to the Thai Music Industry award at the 3rd Manee Mekhala Honorary Awards 2022, presented by the Thai Entertainment Reporters Association. In September, Thongchai was honored with the Rajamangala Honorable Recognition Award in the category of Distinguished Contributions to Culture (Performing Arts) by Rajamangala University of Technology Thanyaburi.

In November, he held the concert series Singing Bird: Lifetime Soundtrack, with three shows at IMPACT Arena. Later that year, he was invited to perform at the APEC 2022 Gala Dinner held at the Royal Thai Navy Auditorium on 17 November. He performed "Phandin Khong Rao" (Our Land), a royal composition by His Majesty King Bhumibol Adulyadej the Great, and the song "Loi Krathong", which represents traditional Thai cultural heritage.

==== Promoting Thai Soft Power and Concerts ====
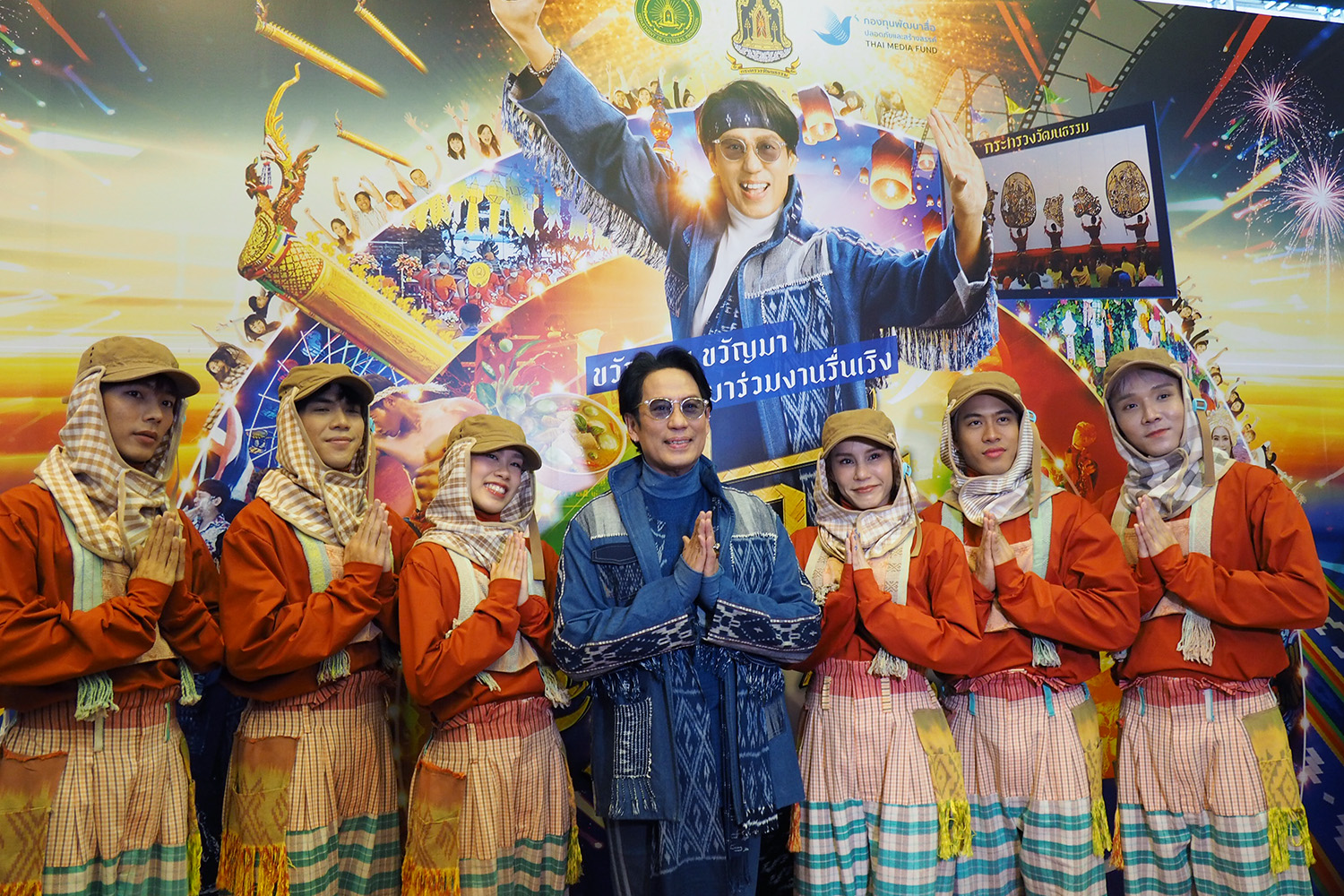
Thongchai with the Ministry of Culture in the THAI 5F project.

In 2023, Thongchai was selected as an artist to represent Thai identity under the Ministry of Culture’s THAI 5F SOFT POWER project, which aimed to elevate Thai cultural works through creative media such as music and public figures. He starred in the music video for the song "Fon Thang Namta" (Tears While Dancing), which showcased the project's five key elements: Food, Film, Fashion (Thai design), Fighting (traditional martial arts), and Festival.

Later that year, he was appointed as a brand ambassador for the Tourism Authority of Thailand (TAT) to promote domestic tourism through the campaign "Thiao Mueang Thai Amazing Ying Kwa Doem" Amazing Thailand: Even More Amazing, under the concept "The Right Moment, Create It Now." He also performed the jingle for the campaign’s promotional video titled "Pai Kan Eek Sak Thi Ko Dee Na" (One More Trip Would Be Great), which served as a soft power element of the campaign.

In May, he received the Lifetime Achievement Award at The Guitar Mag Awards 2023 in recognition of his longstanding contributions to the Thai music industry. That same month, he was presented with the Princess Maha Chakri Sirindhorn’s Moral Entertainment Award at the 13th Nine Entertain Awards, honoring over a decade of virtuous conduct and outstanding artistic contributions.

On 27–28 June, he performed as a guest artist at the 49th Red Cross Benefit Concert, held in honor of the centennial of the passing of Admiral Prince Abhakara Kiartivongse, Prince of Chumphon, who is regarded as the father of the Royal Thai Navy. Thongchai sang "Waltz Navy", "Baan Rao" (Our Home), and joined the ensemble in performing "Kiatyot Navy" (Navy’s Honor). The concert was held at the Thailand Cultural Centre.

In July, he released a special song titled "Thoe Khue Phalang Khong Chan" (You Are My Strength) in celebration of the 45th anniversary of PTT, in collaboration with Waruntorn Paonil. Later that month, he received first prize for Male Vocal Performance in Thai Pop Music for the song "Chai Bandan Raeng Raeng Bandan Chai" (Willpower Brings Inspiration), awarded by the Literature and History Bureau, Fine Arts Department, Ministry of Culture, in honor of National Thai Language Day 2023.

On 21 August, he released the song "Rak Oei" (Oh, Love), which served as the official theme for the television drama Phanom Naka.

==== National Artist and Continued Concert Success ====
The Ministry of Culture, through the Department of Cultural Promotion, held a press conference on 23 August 2023, announcing the selection of 12 individuals as National Artists for the year 2022. Among the honorees was Thongchai McIntyre, recognized in the field of Performing Arts (Contemporary Thai Music – Vocal). On 20 April 2024, he was granted an audience to receive the honorary insignia conferred by His Majesty King Vajiralongkorn, with Her Royal Highness Princess Maha Chakri Sirindhorn presiding on His Majesty’s behalf at Wang Sa Pathum Palace.

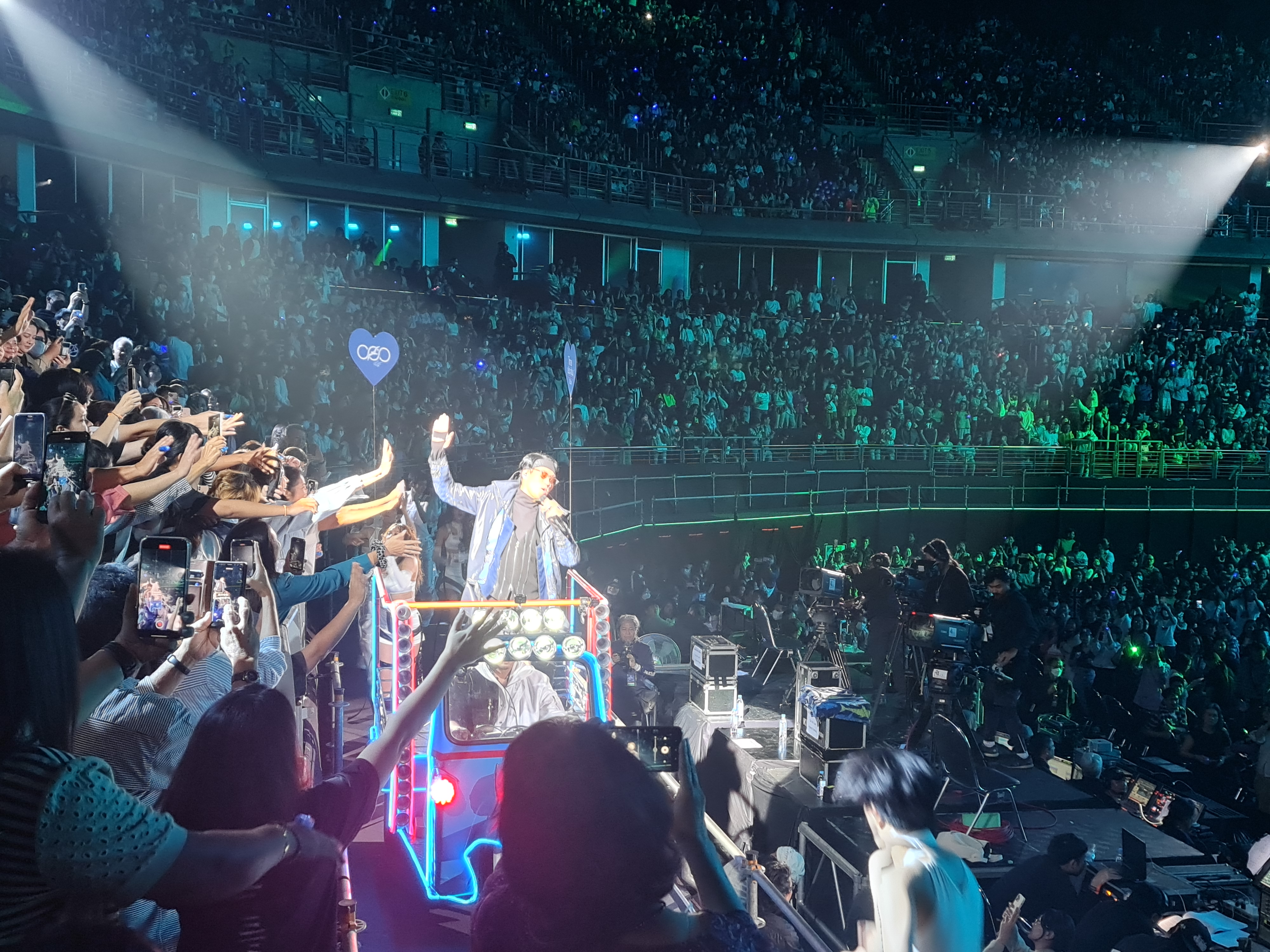
Thongchai performed in the Babb Bird Bird Show No. 12, singing on a traditional Thai tuk-tuk

Following his designation as a National Artist, Thongchai received the HOWE ART AWARD 2023 on 2 November 2023, presented by Howe magazine. Later that month, he headlined the Babb Bird Bird Show No. 12 at IMPACT Arena, staging five performances. This marked his first live concert series since receiving the National Artist title.

In 2024, on 28 May, Thongchai was presented with the Lifetime Honor Award for Contemporary Thai Vocalist at the 20th Kom Chad Luek Awards, recognizing his sustained popularity. Later that year, on 25 September, he won two awards at the 33rd Season Awards (2022–2023), receiving Best Male Solo Artist for his album Bird Twenty-Two and Best Song for "Jai Bandarn Raeng, Raeng Bandarn Jai." From 22 to 24 November, he staged the Khon nok Kab Dok Mai: Dream For Love concert at Impact Arena, performing alongside four guest artists over three nights.

In 2025, Thongchai appeared in two charity concerts at the Thailand Cultural Centre. The first was the 51st Red Cross Charity Concert, held by the Royal Thai Navy on 9–10 June, where he performed songs such as "La Sao Mae Klong" and "Tam Roy Khwam Dee." The second was the 16th Air Force and Thais for Chaipattana concert, organized by the Royal Thai Air Force on 1–2 July. Later that year, he was scheduled to headline the BIRD FANFEST 20XX concert at Impact Arena, consisting of three shows: a charity performance on 21 November, followed by two public performances on 22 and 23 November.

== Notable Works and Reception ==
Historic Career Records of Thongchai McIntyre (as of 2022)
1986	The first male artist under GMM Grammy to sell over 500,000 cassette tapes (Hat Sai Sai Lom Song Rao album)
1988	The highest-selling artist of the 1980s in the special album category; the label did not disclose the exact sales figures (B.E. 2501 album)
1990	The first GMM Grammy artist to sell over 2 million cassette tapes (Boomerang album), and starred in Khu Kam, the highest-rated Thai drama in history, with a viewership rating of 40
1991	The best-selling artist of the 1990s with over 3.5 million copies sold (Prik Kee Noo album); performed the most consecutive concert shows in Thai history – 29 rounds (Babb Bird Bird Show #5)
2002	The highest-selling artist in Thai music history with over 5 million copies sold (Chud Rab Kaek album), including 1 million copies sold within 3 weeks, and over 3 million VCD/DVD concert copies. Total sales across all formats exceeded 8 million
2004	The best-selling special album of the 2000s (Bird-Sek album), with more than 2.5 million copies sold
2008	Performed in the concert with the highest attendance in Thai history (Babb Bird Bird Show #9) with 120,000 spectators
2011	Achieved the highest CD sales and digital downloads of the year, and the highest of the 2010s (2010–2017) (Asa Sanook album)

=== Commercial Success ===
Thongchai has released a number of studio and special albums, with cumulative sales exceeding 25 million copies, ranking him among the best-selling artists in Asia. He has nine albums that each sold over one million copies: seven studio albums — Boomerang (1990), Prik Kee Noo (1991), Thor Thong (1994), Thongchai Service (1998), Tu-Pleng Saman Prajam Barn (1999), Smile Club (2001), and Chud Rab Kaek (2002) — and two special albums — Khon Nok Kab Dok Mai (1995) and Bird-Sek (2004).

He also holds records for having four best-selling albums of their respective eras. Among male solo albums, Prik Kee Noo was the highest-selling of the 1990s, while Chud Rab Kaek dominated the 2000s. In the special album category, B.E. 2501 led the 1980s, and Bird-Sek topped the 2000s. In 2017, his album Asa Sanook (2010) was recognized as one of the 50 best-selling and most downloaded albums of the digital era (2010–2017).

His most successful album, Chud Rab Kaek (2002), made history as the best-selling album in Thai music history. According to a 2002 survey of Bangkok residents’ favorite songs, the track "Fan Ja" ranked first with 34.3% popularity, followed by "Ma Tummai" at 7.2%.

=== Media Recognition and Cultural Impact ===
Thongchai’s enduring popularity has earned him many honorific nicknames from the media, most of which reflect his sustained fame. In 2002, Ramkhamhaeng University conducted a study titled "Bird: Why Does He Remain a Superstar After 20 Years?" The top reasons cited included his gratitude toward others, vocal ability, self-development, and his charisma as an entertainer.

In 2016, the entertainment media outlet Sanook analyzed the reasons for Thongchai’s status as the most successful Thai artist in the past 30 years and as a national superstar. Key factors include his early start as an actor — beginning with the TV drama Nam Tan Mai (1983), which earned him a nomination for Best Supporting Actor at the Mekhala Awards. He later became a GMM Grammy artist via the Siam Kolakarn singing contest in 1984, and gained recognition as a host of 7 See Concert (1986), winning a Best Host award. His popularity grew internationally with the release of Sabai Sabai (1987). Notable milestones in his career include the Boomerang album and the legendary drama Khu Kam (1990), as well as achieving million-selling albums during the economic crisis between 1997–2001: Thongchai Service (1998), Tu-Pleng Saman Prajam Barn (1999), and Smile Club (2001). His historic Chud Rab Kaek album (2002), hit special albums Khon Nok Kab Dok Mai (1995), Bird-Sek (2004), and his record-breaking concerts — especially Babb Bird Bird Show No. 9 — further cemented his legendary status. He has also been a prominent performer of royal tribute songs on national occasions.

In 2022, Bangkok Biz News described Thongchai as the No. 1 superstar in Thailand over the past four decades. In addition to reaffirming earlier assessments, they highlighted his debut album Hat Sai Sai Lom Song Rao (1986), which sold over 500,000 copies — a record for a male Grammy artist at the time. Prik Kee Noo was noted as the highest-selling album of the 1990s, and Babb Bird Bird Show No. 5 set the record for most concert performances in a single run. His album Asa Sanook also led digital-era sales and downloads between 2010 and 2017.

Workpoint Today cited Thongchai's influence, calling him "the ultimate superstar" in the Thai entertainment industry. Over the past four decades, he has sold nearly 30 million albums. During the first two decades of his career, his rise sparked the "Bird Fever" phenomenon across music, television, musical theater, and film. He has remained relevant despite changes in global and domestic music trends by collaborating with modern songwriters and producers, adapting his style while preserving his identity.

Thongchai's popularity has also led to famous actors or singers in other countries, who are considered superstars in their respective nations, often having "Bird" preceding the name of the city or country. For example, Shah Rukh Khan, a superstar in India, is nicknamed "Bird Bombay" in Thailand, a comparison based on the idea that his fame in India is comparable to that of Thongchai. R Zar Ni, a singer from Myanmar, has also been nicknamed "Burmese Bird" in Thailand.

== Discography ==
=== Albums and singles ===
Year	Album name	Special albums	Concert
1986	Hat-Sai Sai-Lom Song-Rao (Beach, Wind, and two of us)	-	Sudchevit Thongchai (All of Life "Thongchai") / Babb Bird Bird Show No. 1
1987	Sabai-Sabai (easygoing)	–	Babb Bird Bird Show No. 2 (Another)
1987	Rap Kwan Wan Mai (Blessing for a new day)	–	–
1988	Sor-Kor-Sor (Greeting Card)	Thongchai 2501	Soup with no Bean sprouts concert / Bird-perd-sa-card
1989	-	–	Babb Bird Bird Show No. 3 (Fly to horizon)
1990	Boomerang	–	Concert Boomerang man / Babb Bird Bird Show No. 4 (It's in the Boomerang man hand)
1991	Prik-Kee-Noo (Bird Chilli)	–	Babb Bird Bird Show No. 5 (Happies and our memories never end)
1992	–	–	–
1993	–	–	–
1994	Tor-Thong (The Flag)	Wan-Nee Tee Ror-Koy (TV drama Soundtrack)	TorThong and Torther (that you)/Babb Bird Bird Show No. 6 (Dream & Reality)
1995	Dream	Khon-nok-kab-Dok-Mai (Feather & Flowers)	Dream concert
1996	–	–	Feather & Flowers concert
1997	–	Niramit (TV drama soundtrack)	Green concert no. 3 Singing Bird
1998	Thongchai Service	Thongchai Special Service	Concert Thongchai service / Concert Thongchai special service
1999	Tu-Pleng Saman Prajam Barn (The Everyhouse Jukebox)	–	Babb Bird Bird Show No. 7 (Aroka)
2000	–	100 Pleng Rak Mai Roo Job (100 everlasting love songs)	–
2001	Thongchai Smile club	Bird Love Beat 1 & 2	Smile club concert
2002	Chud Rab Kaek (Welcome, Guests!)	–	Concert For Fans by Thongchai McIntyre
2003	–	–	Babb Bird Bird Show No. 8 (TOGETHER)
2004	–	Bird-Sek with Sek Loso	Bird-Sek concert
2005	Bird Volume 1	–	Volume 1 concert Oh la nor My Love
2006	Thongchai Village	Bird Perd Floor	Concert Bird Perd Floor
2007	Simply Bird	-	–
2008	-	-	Babb Bird Bird Show No. 9 MAGIC MEMORIES
2009	–	–	Fancy fans zone concert
2010	Bird Asa sanook	–	–
2011	-	–	Bird Asa sanook concert
2012	–	Secret garden	Babb Bird Bird Show No. 10 (Our day is still)
2013	–	–	Feather & Flowers Secret garden
2014	–	Kolkimono (TV drama soundtrack)	-
2015		–	Feather & Flowers The Original Returns
2016	–	–	Romwong THONGCHAI concert
2017	-	–	–
2018	Bird mini marathon	–	Babb Bird Bird Show No. 11 "DREAM JOURNEY"
2019	–	–	SINGING BIRD CONCERT BY REQUEST
2022	22 (Twenty Two)	–	SINGING BIRD #2/2022 LIFETIME SOUNDTRACK CONCERT

== Original soundtrack ==
- Song name "Rak oei" (รักเอ๋ย), opening theme The Bride of Naga

== TV dramas ==
Year	Title	Native title	Role
1983	Namtan Mai	น้ำตาลไหม้	Ae
1984	Muer Ruk Rao	เมื่อรักร้าว	
1984	Baan Soi Dao	บ้านสอยดาว	Pawuti
1984	Kamin Gub Poon	ขมิ้นกับปูน	Tanpan
1985	Ruk Nai Sai Mok	รักในสายหมอก	
1985	Pleng Haeng Cheewit	เพลงแห่งชีวิต	Nat
1985	Benjarong 5 See	เบญจรงค์ห้าสี	Chanayu
1985	Plub Plerng See Chompoo	พลับพลึงสีชมพู	Witsarut Marupong
1985	Wong Wien Hua Jai	วงเวียนหัวใจ	Tos Kanaphan
1986	Majurat See Nam Pueng	มัจจุราชสีน้ำผึ้ง	Prawut Thraipolrachata
1986	Nuer Nang	เนื้อนาง	
1987	Duang Fai Yai Mai Song Chun	ดวงไฟใยไม่ส่องฉัน	
1989	Takai Dao	ตะกายดาว	Guest Role (Ep.2)
1990	Khu Kam	คู่กรรม	Kobori
1993	Wan Nee Tee Ror Khoi	วันนี้ที่รอคอย	Chao San
1997	Niramit	นิรมิต	Jao Phuwong / Pangkee / Taiwan
1998	Kwam Song Jum Mai Huajai Derm	ความทรงจำใหม่หัวใจเดิม	Dieow
2015	Kol Kimono	กลกิโมโน	M.R. Hochinoji / Hoshi
2016	We Were Born in the 9th Reign	เราเกิดในรัชกาลที่ ๙ เดอะซีรีส์	Mor Don

== Awards ==
The best of Thongchai	
*1984 Siam-Kollakarn Contest: The Best Singer Thai Music for See Wit Lakorn and Chud Hmay Play Tang, The Special from Dr. Thaworn Pornprapa	*1986 Mekala: The Best Man Presenters
*1987 The office of national young people or Sor Yor Chor: The Best Artist )	*1990 Coke Music Award: The album was a success for Boomerang
1991	
* Mekala: The Best Man Actor for Sunset at Chaopraya (TV Lakorn)	* TV Golden: The Best Man Actor for Sunset at Chaopraya (TV Lakorn)
* MTV Asian Viewer's Choice Award	* NCSWT: The Outstanding child
1993	
* 1993 Vote Award: The Best Man Actor for Wannee Tee Raw-Koy (TV Lakorn)	*1994 TV Golden: The Best Man Actor for Wannee Tee Raw-Koy (TV Lakorn)
*1995 Saraswati: The Best Man Actor for Sunset at Chaopraya (Movie)	* 1995 Saraswati: The Best Movie music for Thoe Khon Diaw (Music)
*1995 Vote Award: The Popular Man Actor for Sunset at Chaopraya	* 1996 Billboard Viewer's Choice Award first in Asia
* 1997 Ganesha Golden: The Special Creative Music for Ton Mai Khong Por	
2002	
* 2002 Seesun Award: The Best Song for Lao Su Kan Fang	*Top Awards: The Best Singer (2002)
* 2002 Top Awards: The Best Singer for Lao Su Kan Fang	* 2002 Channel [V] Thailand Music Video Awards: The Popular Man Artist Music video for Lao Su Kan Fang
2003	
*Top Awards: The Best Singer (2003)	
*Channel [V] Thailand Music Video Awards: The Best Music video for Fan Ja (2003)	*Channel [V] Thailand Music Video Awards: The Popular Artist (2003)
*Diamond Siam: The Sampler for Promotion of Thai arts and culture (2003)	*MTV Asia Awards: The Favorite Artist Thailand (2004)
*Top Awards: The Best Singer (2004)	*Top Awards: The Best Singer (2005)
*Annual Chalermthai Awards: The Thai Artist of the year (2005)	*Oops! awards: The Popular Man Singer (2005)
2006	
*MTV Asia Awards: The Inspiration Award (2006)	*Channel [V] Thailand Music Video Awards: The Popular Music video for My love (2006)
*Channel [V] Thailand Music Video Awards: The Popular Artist (2006)	*Virgin Hitz Awards: The Achievement Awards (2006)
*FAT award: The Best Music video of the year for My love (2006)	*Sor Nor Chor: The Popular Man Artist of the year (2006)
2007	
*Top Awards: The Best Singer (2007)	*Star Entertainment Awards: The Popular Man Singer (2007)
*In Young Generation Choice: The Long man acting actor of the year (2007)	*TVPool Star Party Award: The Artist in heart (2007)
*Seed AWARDS: The Popular Man Artist (2007)	*Seed of the month awards: The Popular Man Artist for November (2007)
2008	
*Ministry of Culture: The Gratitude (2007)	*Top Awards: The Best Singer (2008)
*Seesun Award: The Best Song for Nam Ta (2008)	*Star Entertainment Awards: The Best Man Singer (2008)
*Nine Entertain Awards: The Man Singer of the year (2008)	*In Young Generation Choice: The Long man acting actor of the year (2008)
*TVPool Star Party Award: The Popular singer for people (2008)	*Seed AWARDS: The Quality artists (2008)
*Pet Nai Plang: The Outstanding singing in the Thai language for Me Tea Kid Thung (2008)	
2009	
*Channel [V] Thailand Music Video Awards: The Thai invention for Babb Bird Bird Show Concert (2009)	
*Annual Chalermthai Awards: The Song of Thai Film of the Year for Chadaimailumkan (2009)	*In Young Generation Choice: The Long man acting actor of the year (2009)
*TVPool Star Party Award: The Popular singer for Superstar (2009)	*Pet Nai Plang: The Outstanding singing in the Thai language for Pai Thew Kan (2009)
*TV INSIDE HOT AWARDS: The King of Hot (2009)	
2010	
*Prakaipet: The Outstanding Thai Artist (2010)	*Thailand National Film Association Awards: The Best Movie Music for Chadaimailumkan (2010)
2011	
*Channel [V] Thailand Music Video Awards: The Popular Music video for Too Much so Much Very Much (2011)	*Seed AWARDS: The Inspirational artist (2011)
*Ministry of Culture: The Virtuous artist promotes Buddhism of Thailand (2011)	*SiamDara Star awards: The Popular Thai singers (2011)
*Bang Awards: The Dead dance music for Too Much so Much Very Much (2011)	*Intensive Watch: The Popular Song for Yatamyangnee Maiwakapkai Kawjaimai (2011)
*Gmember Awards: The most beloved artist (2011)	*Top Awards: The Best Singer (2011)
2012	
*TVPool Star Party Award: The Popular for people (2012)	*Pet Nai Plang: The Outstanding singing in the Thai language for Tam Roi Pra Racha (2012)
*SiamDara Star awards: The Popular Thai singers (2012)	*SiamDara Star awards: The Siam Dara Star for People (2012)
*Gmember Awards: The most beloved artist (2012)	*MThai Top Talk-About: The most talked-about singer (2012)
*Shining star: The Successful artists and social activities (2012)	*Office of the Secretary of the Supreme Patriarch: The benefit of Buddhism (2012)
*Tara Award: People with a Bodhisattva Heart, which is beneficial to society (2012)	*TV Golden: Best voice cartoon actor Bird: The Flying With Byrd (2012)
2013	
*SiamDara Star awards: The Superstar Forever (2013)	*Shining star: The Successful artists and social activities (2013)
*Kinnara: Good people think good society Follow the Royal footprint (2013)	*Daradaily Award: The Best Person (2013)
*9 people prototype Steps to the king project: The Best singer (2013)	*CROW Awards: The Best singer (2013)
2014	
*TVPool Star Party Award: The Popular for people (2013)	*Shining star: The Successful artists and social activities (2014)
*Japan Tourism Award: The special award for People who play an important role To travel to Japan (2014)	*SiamDara Star awards: The Star Idol (2014)
*GMM Digital Domain: Top Load via *123 for Kon Pea Timaimee Namta (2015)	*KPN Award: The Lifetime Achievement Award (2016)
2018	
Joox Icon Award from JOOX Thailand Music Awards 2018	
2023	
*2023 National Artist (Performing Arts)

== Covers by other artists ==
In 2012, the popular Japanese girl group Berryz Kobo released a song titled "Cha Cha Sing" as a single. The title track is a cover of the song "Row Mah Sing" by Bird Thongchai. The first coupling track "Loving You Too Much" is also a cover of a Bird Thongchai's song, "Too Much So Much Very Much". Both were translated into Japanese. The single debuted at number 6 on the Japanese Oricon weekly singles chart. In 2013, Japanese girl group Berryz Kobo released a single titled "Asian Celebration". The coupling track of the Limited Edition B and Limited Edition D, "I like a Picnic" is a cover of a Bird Thongchai's song, "กอดกัน (Gaud-gun)".

== Royal decorations ==
Thongchai has received the following royal decorations in the Honours System of Thailand:

- "'1991"' – Commander (Third Class) of the Most Exalted Order of the White Elephant
- "'2005"' – Silver Medalist (Seventh Class) of the Most Admirable Order of the Direkgunabhorn
- "'2012"' – First Class (Gold Medal) of Red Cross Medal of Appreciation
