= Myria Benedetti =

Thai actress, singer and model (born 1975)

- มีเรีย เบนเนเด็ดตี้
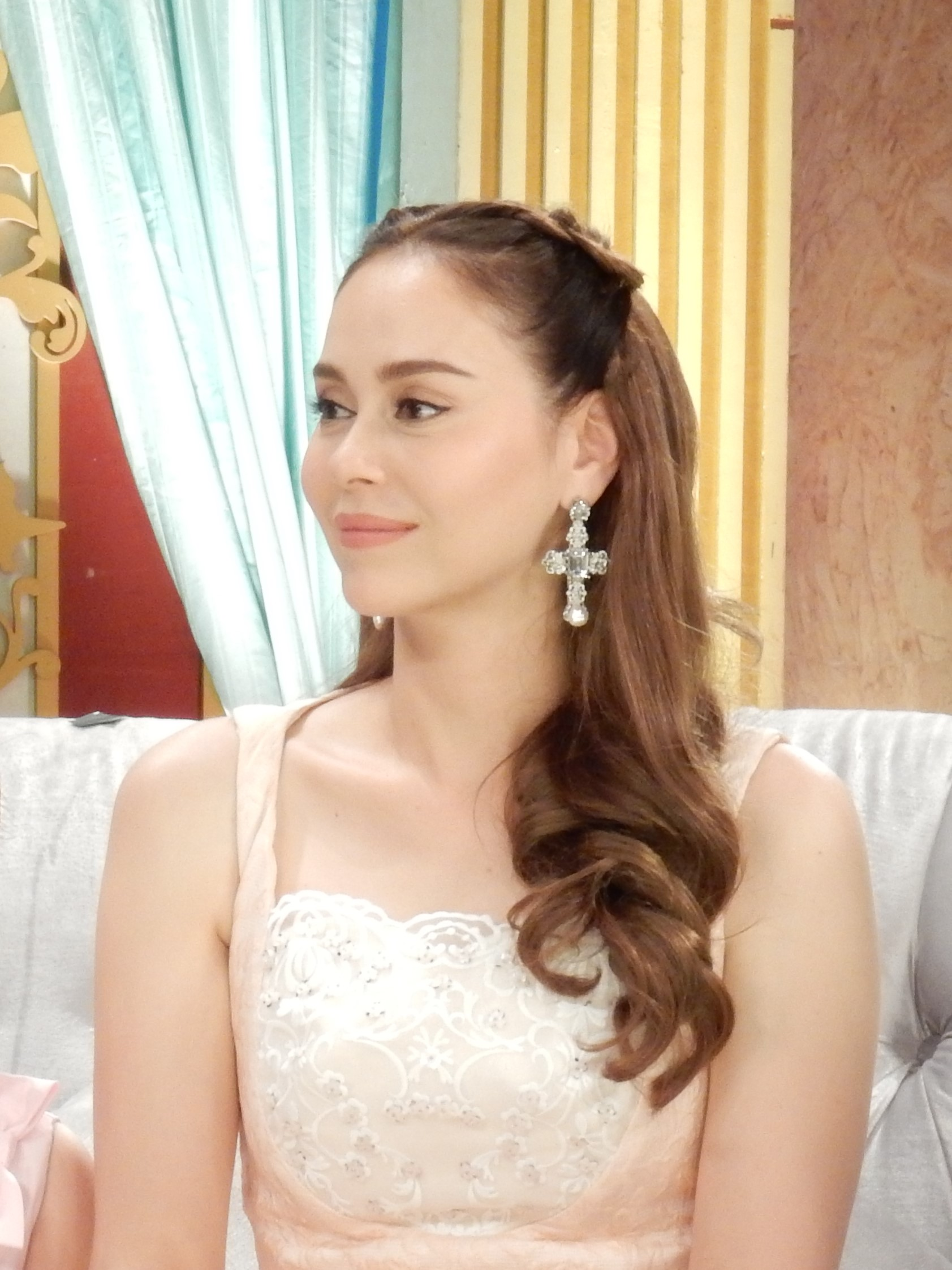
- Benedetti in 2016
- Born: Myria Alexandra Benedetti; February 6, 1975 (age 51); Neuchâtel, Switzerland
- Other name: Nat
- Occupations: Actress; singer; model
- Years active: 1989–present
- Spouses: Somchai Kemglad (m. 2003; div. 2006) Atichart Chumnanon (m. 2014; div. 2024)
- Musical career
- Genres: Pop; dance; R&B
- Instrument: Vocals
- Label: GMM Grammy (1994–2012)
- Website: Official website

Myria Alexandra Benedetti (Thai: มีเรีย เบนเนเด็ดตี้; born February 6, 1975) or commonly known as Nat Myria (นัท มีเรีย), is a Thai singer, actress, model and television presenter.

== Early life ==
Myria Alexandra Benedetti, is the only child of her Thai mother and Swiss-Italian father. Although she started out as an actress at an early age and still acts in many Thai dramas, movies, and stage productions, she is best known as a talented singer. She also used to host a talk show called Anne-Nat Unlimited with her best friend, actress Anne Thongprasom.

== Career ==
Benedetti was first recognized for her singing abilities when she performed as a guest in Bird Thongchai's Yahk Hen Taung Fah Pen Yang Nai Fun Concert. Soon after this, she was given the opportunity to record a soundtrack for a drama she was starring in (Keu Hatata Kraung Pipop (Thai: คือหัตถาครองพิภพ)). She soon was offered a contract with GMM Grammy and was featured in the 6.2.12 special album with fellow Thai artists Christina Aguilar, Jay Jetrin, Mos Patiparn, Tata Young, and UHT. The following year, Benedetti released her first solo album Nat Myria Benedetti.

=== Music ===
- Album "Vietrio & Friends" - Special Album (GMM Grammy) released 16 September 2010
- Album "Forever Love Hits By Nat Myria" - Special Album (GMM Grammy) released 30 June 2010
- Album "Get Up Beautiful" - (GMM Grammy) released 14 July 2008
- Album "Chill Time" - Special Album (GMM Grammy) released 31 October 2006
- Album "Sleepless Society Vol. 2" - Special Album (GMM Grammy) released 29 August 2006
- Album "Life&Love" (GMM Grammy) released 17 February 2006
- Album "Chud Rub Kaek" - Special Album (Grammy Entertainment) released 5 November 2002
- Album "We Love Carpenters" - Special Album (Grammy Entertainment) released 2002
- Album "Emotion" (Grammy Entertainment) released 24 January 2002
- Album "Unrealeased" - Special Album (Grammy Entertainment) released 16 October 2001
- Album "Seven" - Special Album (Grammy Entertainment) released 30 November 2000
- Album "Colorful" (Grammy Entertainment) released 21 September 2000
- Album "Freshy Myria" (Grammy Entertainment) released 25 March 1999
- Album "Sugar Free" (Grammy Entertainment) released 20 January 1998
- Album "Mini Album Happy Birthday" - Special Album (Grammy Entertainment) released 6 February 1997
- Album "Nat Myria Benedetti" (Grammy Entertainment) released 6 February 1996
- Album "6.2.12" - Special Album (Grammy Entertainment) released 9 January 1996

=== Drama Series ===
- Tra Baap Sri Klao : Channel 5 (2010)
- Khun Nai Sai Lub : Channel 5 (2006)
- Shai Yai Ruk : Channel 5 (2004)
- Jao Chao Sai Fah Labb : Channel 3 (2002)
- Wang Waree : Channel 3 (2001)
- Cha Poh Hua Jai Hai Tur : Channel 5 (1999)
- Ni Yai Ruk Paak Song : Channel 5 (1998)
- Dang Duang Harutai : Channel 7 (1996)
- Keu Hatata Kraung Pipop : Channel 7 (1995)
- Nam Sai Jai Jing: Channel 7 (1994)

=== Ads ===
- Trylagina supreme collagen advance booster serum (2016)
- Olay Total Effect Shower Cream (2010)
- Olay Total Effect Cream owned by GlaxoWellcome (2007, 2009)
- Systema Toothpaste (2006)
- Bigen Prominous Hair Dye owned by SmithKline Beecham (2005)

=== On Stage ===
- Mae Nak Pra Kanong The Musical (May - July 2009)
- Fah Jarod Sai (24 May - 7 June 2007)
- Aroka
