= Nititad Promotion =

Thai record label

Nititad Promotion (Thai: นิธิทัศน์ โปรโมชั่น, RTGS: Nithithat) was a Thai record label which operated during the 1980s and 1990s. It was Thailand's third-largest record label at the time, after GMM Grammy and RS Promotion, and the leading label catering to Sino-Thai audiences.

The company was formed by the merger of two record labels: NP Promotion by Narucha Pengpol, a DJ, and Original Sound by Wichian Asavisesiwakul, with Witthaya Supaphorn-opas and Santi Sawet-wimol, is a consultant to the company.

It operated from about 1982 until 1995, when the company became Nititad Entertainment. And it remains only to bring the past works of the singers under the label to be distribution again. In the past, Nititad had a joint venture with Rota Phonograph-Tape Co., Ltd. and Onpa Co., Ltd. to produce records and tapes for sale nationwide. But at present, Nititad separated from Onpa and Rota to own produce and distribute. By changing the name of the company to Nititad AOA, by The word AOA cames from the first letters of the names of Wichian's three children is Aim Oat and Ae.

== List of Singers ==
- Danupol Kaewkarn
- Tik Shiro
- Grand EX'
- Tuangsith Riamjinda
- The Impossibles
- Piyapong Pue-on
- Pornpimol Thammasan
- Yodrak Salakjai
- Sorapong Chatree
- Don Sornrabiab
