= Tik Shiro =

Thai singer, songwriter, musical producer and actor

Tik Shiro ติ๊ก ชิโร่
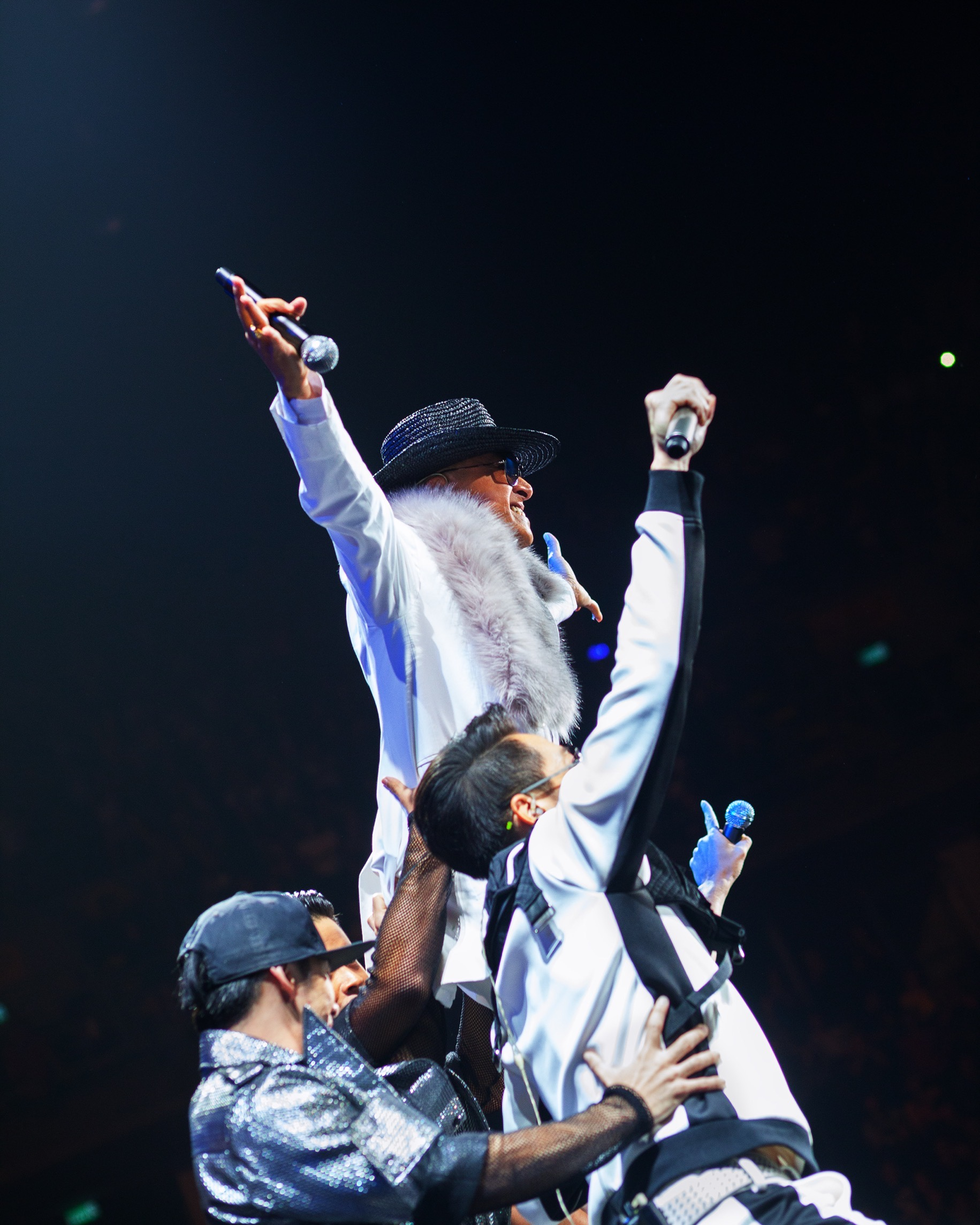
- Tik Shiro in 2024

Background information
- Born: Sirisak Nuntasane; September 25, 1961 (age 65)
- Origin: Nakhon Ratchasima, Thailand
- Genres: T-pop; pop dance
- Occupations: Drummer; songwriter; producer; choreographer; actor; TV presenter
- Instruments: Drums; piano
- Years active: 1987–present
- Labels: Nititad; GMM Grammy
- Spouse: Pantipa Nuntasane (m. 1994)
- Past members: Ploy

Sirisak Nuntasane (Thai: ศิริศักดิ์ นันทเสน) or commonly known by the stage name Tik Shiro (ติ๊ก ชิโร่) is a Thai singer, songwriter, musical producer, and actor, especially popular in the 1990s.

Born in Nakhon Ratchasima Province in northeastern Thailand. Tik entered the entertainment industry as a drummer for Ploy (พลอย), a popular pop band in the late 1980s under Nititad Promotion. In the early 1990s, he had the opportunity to release a solo album in pop dance genre, it had a reputation for him until it was widely known. Referred to as "Michael Jackson of Thailand", because he was consciously and unconsciously influenced by Jackson's singing and dancing style. In the Thai music industry at the time, there were three favoured pop dance male singers were Jetrin "J" Wattanasin from Grammy Entertainment, Touch Na Takuatung from RS Promotion, and Tik Shiro from Nititad Promotion.

Prior to that, in 1987, he also produced the soundtrack for the TV series on Channel 3 titled Awasarn Kong Salesman (อวสานของเซลส์แมน), adapted from Arthur Miller's Death of a Salesman. The series portrayed Pisan Akaraseranee, Sarunyoo Wongkrachang and Pongpat Wachirabunjong.

For Tik, he writes lyrics, vocals, and choreographed all the dances himself. Especially his second solo album, Tem Niew (เต็มเหนี่ยว) in 1992 it had sold over a million copies.

Most of his popular songs were fast-tempo songs include Tuk Jai Nid Nid (ถูกใจนิด ๆ, "I kinda like it"), Chaiyo (ไชโย, "bravo"), Manud Kangkao (มนุษย์ค้างคาว, "batman"), Khong Paeng (ของแพง, "high-priced"), Ok Ma Ten (ออกมาเต้น, "come out dancing"), Pai Kub Chan (ไปกับฉัน, "come with me"), Du Chud Chud (ดูชัด ๆ, "clear-sighted"). While low-tempo songs were Yah Pai Kid (อย่าไปคิด, "don't think"), Ya Tam Pen Hen Jai (อย่าทำเป็นเห็นใจ, "don’t act like you’re sympathetic"), Yom Rab Khon Diao (ยอมรับคนเดียว, "I accepted it alone"), Ro Rub Dai Loei (รอรับได้เลย, "I can wait to accept it"), Rak Mai Yom Bplian Bplaeng (รักไม่ยอมเปลี่ยนแปลง, "love never changes").

In addition, he was also an actor in many TV series and movies, as well as TV host, and singing to the activities of the government on many other occasions, such as the opening ceremony of the 24th SEA Games in Nakhon Ratchasima in 2007.

He is married to Phantira "Aor" Nuntasane, the couple has two daughters.

At around 4am on October 10, 2024, he crashed his van into three siblings riding a motorbike on the overpass of Thepparak Road in the area of Sai Mai. The motorbike fell off the overpass, one of the sisters died, while the younger brother was seriously injured. He admitted his guilt without fleeing, and stood waiting to surrender to the police. Later, on June 24, 2026, the Criminal Court sentenced him to four years in prison. However, due to his confession and admission of guilt, his sentence was reduced to two years. The court ordered that the sentence be served without suspension.
