= Grand Ex =

Thai musical group

- Genres: Luk Krung; Luk thung; Pop; Pop rock
- Years active: 1970-2020
- Past members: Nakorn Vejsupaporn; Danupol Kaewkarn; Prasith Chaiyatho; Thanongsak Arpornsiri; Wasan Sirisukpisai; Chokdee Phak-phoo; Saneh Supparat; Panus Hirunkasi; Sarayuth Supunyo; Sutee Saeng-serichon; Isoon Watayanont; Johnny Anfone; Chamrus Sewataporn; Arichai Aranyanath; Pittaphol Choti-sorrayuth; Jakamai Srivalai

Grand Ex (Thai: แกรนด์เอ็กซ์), stylized as Grand EX', were a famous Thai pop band during the 1970s and 1980s. Founded by Nakorn Vejsupaporn, the band was initially formed under the name "Extreme" when its members were students at Borpitpimook College. The band later renamed itself as Grand Ex for the 3rd Thai String Combo Championship. They released their first single collection in 1977 and played a significant role in the evolution of Thai pop music through their songs and distinctive style.

== Name origin ==
Nakorn, the founder and band leader, was a fan of both Grand Funk Railroad and The Jimi Hendrix Experience. He combined the names of the two bands to form "Grand Experience". The name was later shortened to Grand Ex, inspired by Expo ’70, a world’s fair held in Osaka, Japan, which was often referred to in promotional materials as "EX’ 70".

== History ==
=== 1969–1975: Formation ===
Grand Ex was formed in 1969 by a group of high school students at Borpitphimook College, led by Nakorn Vejsupaporn as the lead guitarist and band leader. and including his fellow students, Kamthorn Kunanukul (rhythm guitar), Warawut Hiranyawan (bass), Damrong Chuencharoensuk (spokesperson and lead vocalist), Narong Phuek-hawharn (lead vocalist), Prasith Chaiyatho (drums) and Sommart Thoopjinda (organ).

In 1970, the members of Grand Ex participated in the Thai String Combo Championship in the student category. Notably, "The Impossibles" won the professional category for the second consecutive year, following their victory in 1969. In the student category, the band Mummy was crowned the champion, while Grand Ex won the first runner-up prize. They also won the media’s Favorite Award, thanks to their modest attire of black trousers, white shirts, and ties, which contrasted with the outfits of other rock bands in the competition.

After the contest, some members graduated and pursued higher education, leaving only Nakorn, Prasith, and Warawut, who decided to continue making the band and to find the new members. Nakorn became so committed that he chose to forgo the opportunity to study at a more prestigious university in order to remain at the same university as Prasith and Warawut, making it more convenient to rehearse with the band.

Grand Ex became known for performing in clubs, bars, and GI camps in the provinces. After about eight months, more band members resigned, and Nakorn set out to recruit new members, deciding to transform Grand Ex into a full-fledged string-combo band. In 1974, they welcomed new members—Chay Sangcha-um (saxophone), Sanae Supparat (trumpet), and Somsak Apiwatthirakul (trombone)—along with a new lead singer, Wasan Taesakul (surname at that time).

=== 1976–1980 : Koo Nok and Luk Thung Disco 1 & 2 ===
In 1976, Warawut, the bassist and co-founder of the band, and the keyboardist left, which required Wasan, the lead singer, to take over playing the keyboard. The band welcomed Aed-Thanongsak Arpornsiri as the new bassist. In the same year, the band welcomed Chamras Saewataporn as the new lead singer and rhythm guitarist.

In 1977, the band released their first single, Koo Nok (คู่นก), a Thai version of the Lao song Khard Ruk by William Didtavong. After the release of the single, saxophonist Chay Saeng Cha-um resigned from the band, and Panus Hirankasi became the new saxophonist.

In 1979, Grand Ex released their first studio album, Luk Thung Disco, which combined international disco styles with the luk thung songs that were popular at the time. The album sold well, boosting the band’s popularity. This was followed by a second album, which was recorded live at the Manhattan Club.

In early 1980, Grand Ex released their third album, Luk Thung Disco 2. After the release of this album, Chamras and Somsak resigned from the band, with Danupol Kaewkarn and Chokdee Pak-Phu joining as new members.

=== 1980–1984: Golden Era and the End of the Classic Line-up ===
By the end of 1980, the band’s line-up consisted of Nakorn Vejsupaporn (lead guitarist, lead vocalist, and band leader), Prasith Chaiyatho (drums), Danupol Kaewkarn (rhythm guitarist and lead vocalist), Thanongsak Arpornsiri (bass), Panus Hirunkasi (saxophone), Sanae Supparat (trumpet), Chokdee Phak-phoo (saxophone, trombone, keyboard), and Wasan Taesakul (keyboard, vocals, and drums).

In July 1980, Grand Ex released fourth studio album, Khuen (เขิน), featuring entirely new songs. On March 8, 1981, they released fifth studio album, Women (ผู้หญิง), in celebration of International Women’s Day.

In July 1981, they released their sixth album, a live recording of their performance at the Chula Auditorium, which had been recorded in November 1980. In October of the same year, they released their seventh studio album, Grand XO, and held an album release concert at the National Theatre on October 31. It was the first album-opening concert in Thailand and also the first to be broadcast live on television. The album consisted of ten luk krung songs that were relatively unknown, which were rearranged and remixed. The record was a major success, selling over 1.5 million copies.

Following this album, Grand Ex decided to switch labels from Azona Promotion to TSE Group, which was affiliated with the Thairath newspaper. They released their eighth studio album, Bupphesanniwat, in March 1982, followed by their ninth album, Nij Nirand, in September the same year. Shortly after, in October, they unveiled their tenth studio album, Phromlikit. In this album, the band welcomed Odd–Sarayuth Supanyo as its ninth member and the final addition to the “classic line-up.” Afterward, they went on to release three more albums: the live recording Valentine Laser Concert, Petch, and Borisuth. The Borisuth album, which was their 13th studio release, came out in April 1984. Aod Sarayuth was the first member to leave the band in order to form Infinity, Thailand’s first jazz fusion band, reducing the band to eight remaining members. Later, in November of the same year, the band released their 14th studio album, “Duang Duean,” which became the final album of the classic lineup. After the promotional tour for this album ended, four more members — Aed Thanongsak, Daeng Sanae, Tee Wasan, and Rak Panus — resigned to form a new band. leaving four members — Nakorn, Danupol, Prasith, and Chokdee — who went on to establish the band’s record label under the name Grand Ex Family.

=== 1985–2019 ===
In early 1985, they released their 15th studio album, Pink Heart (หัวใจสีชมพู), with the band Marble (หินอ่อน) serving as the backup band, performing both in the recording studio and on stage for Grand Ex. Later in July of the same year, Grand Ex released their 16th studio album, Sai-yai (สายใย), and welcomed a new member, Oh–Aisoon Watyanon, a longtime fan of the band, as their new lead singer. After the end of the concert tour, Danupol Kaewkarn, the lead singer of the band, decided to leave from the band to become the first solo artist in Thailand. Later, the band get a new member was Arichai Aranyanat, Johnny Anfone, followed by Sutee Sangsareechon, released 2 special albums, and one studio album was Nirankarn, which was the 17th studio album, before that, Chokdee, the saxophonist, had resigned from the band and their released the 3 albums, divided into 2 studio albums and 1 special album, with the last album Dai Mai (ได้ไหม), the 19th studio album released in November 1988 before decided disbanded.

The band played a reunion concert in 2002 and June 2016. The band played their final concert in August 2019. Danupol Kaewkarn, Nakorn Vejsupaporn, Johnny Anfone, Thanongsak Apornsiri, Panat Hirunkasi, Chamras Saewataporn, Sutee Sangsareechon, Wasan Sirisukpisai, and Aisoon "Oh" Watayanon all performed.

== Discography ==
=== Singles ===
- Couple Birds (คู่นก) (1977)

=== Albums ===
- Luk Thung Disco (ลูกทุ่งดิสโก, 1979)
- Live Performance Recording at Manhattan Club (1979)
- Luk Thung Disco 2 (ลูกทุ่งดิสโก 2, 1980)
- Khuen (เขิน) (1980)
- Women (ผู้หญิง) (1981)
- Live Performance Recording at the Chula Auditorium (1981)
- Grand XO (1981)
- Bupphesanniwat (บุพเพสันนิวาส, 1982)
- Nij Nirand (นิจนิรันดร์, 1982)
- Phromlikit (พรหมลิขิต, 1982)
- Live Performance Recording Valentine Laser Concert (1983)
- Petch (เพชร, 1983)
- Borisuth (บริสุทธิ์, 1984)
- Duang Duen (ดวงเดือน, 1984)
- Pink Heart (หัวใจสีชมพู, 1985)
- Sai Yai (สายใย, 1985)
- Nirunkarn (1986)
