= Danupol Kaewkarn =

Thai singer and songwriter (born 1959)

Danupol Kaewkarn ดนุพล แก้วกาญจน์
- Also known as: P' Jae; Jae Danupol
- Born: 11 October 1959 (age 67); Bangkok, Thailand
- Genre: Pop
- Occupations: Singer; musician; songwriter
- Years active: 1980–present
- Labels: Azona; Nititad; Internal; RS
- Formerly of: Grand Ex

Danupol Kaewkarn or Jae (ดนุพล แก้วกาญจน์, born 11 October 1959) is a Thai singer, songwriter, musician and producer, who became very popular among teenagers in the 1980s. After splitting from Grand EX', he released his first solo album in 1986.

== Biography ==
Danupol Kaewkarn was born on 11 October 1959 at Chulalongkorn Hospital as the youngest child of five siblings. As a young boy, Danupol received his primary education form several schools including Wat Khema Phirataram School and high school education from Horwang School.

== Career ==
Danupol started playing folksongs since high school and debuted as a professional singer at the Love Coffee Shop (Floor 4, Siam Center) with only 10 baht per hour (at that time, more than 40 years ago) climbed up to earn up to 40,000 baht per month, which was considered a huge income in those days. Then he moved to play at the Birthday shop under the president cinema. (currently demolished). Until being a member of Grand EX', when the members of the group watched the performance and listened to his voice, and without hesitation persuaded him to join the band,

Danupol, joined Grand Ex' in the album Shy (เขิน), the band's 4th album, which was released in July 1980 under the label Azona Promotion. with senior musicians whom joined the band at the same time was Chokdee Pakpoo or Tae (เต๊ะ)

After the classical era members dispersed at the end of the Duang Duen album, the 14th studio album that was released in November 1984 under the new label, TSE Group, part of the Thai Rath Newspaper group. Danupol, along with the other 3 members, Nakorn Vejsupaporn or Tong a guitarist and band leader, Prasit Chaiyatho, and Chokdee Pakpoo. Together they have established a new music band called Grand Ex' Family, and released two albums with the band, Pink Heart (หัวใจสีชมพู), the 15th studio album and Sai Yai (สายใย) the 16th studio album, before leaving the band to become a solo artist. Danupol is the first solo artist in Thailand.

== Solo artist ==
Danupol signed the contract as a singer under the famous record label of that era, such as Nititad Promotion, and released an album of golden dreams (ฝันสีทอง) on 1 February 1986, with The Ploy band (วงพลอย), which he founded as a backup band. This album was successful to the point of having to change the cover in May of the same year.

After releasing 8 albums with Nititad, consisted of 5 full albums and 3 special albums, Danuphon expired with Nititad in early 1991 and released his own record label under the name "Internal" has Henry Preecha-panich as the first artist, together with Nontiya Jiwbang-pa (นนทิยา จิวบางป่า), Orawan Yenpoonsuk (อรวรรณ เย็นพูนสุข) or Pum from the Sao Sao Sao band (สาว สาว สาว). Tuk Siriporn Yooyod and by myself. Including opening a recording studio at the same name, but not in operation for a short time, the music label closed down. As for the recording studio, the business was operated for a while and eventually shut down.

In the year 2004, Danupol released a studio album "Can't help, not enough man" (ช่วยไม่ได้ผู้ชายไม่พอ), under the giant music label RS, after leaving the solo album for 9 years, but without success due to lack of promotion.
