= Rewat Buddhinan =

Thai singer-songwriter (1948–1996)

Rewat Buddhinan เรวัต พุทธินันทน์
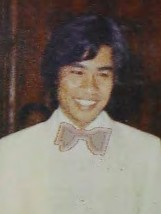
- Buddhinan in 1974

Background information
- Also known as: Ter (เต๋อ)
- Born: 5 September 1948; Bangkok, Thailand
- Died: 27 October 1996 (aged 48) Bangkok, Thailand
- Genres: Pop; soft rock
- Occupations: Singer; songwriter; record producer
- Instrument: Vocals
- Years active: 1983–1996
- Label: GMM Grammy
- Formerly of: The Impossibles

Rewat Buddhinan (Thai: เรวัต พุทธินันทน์; RTGS: Rewat Phutthinan; September 5, 1948 – October 27, 1996), nicknamed Ter (เต๋อ Toe), was a Thai singer, songwriter and record producer and founding member of the Thai pop group, The Impossibles. He was a pioneer in the Thai pop and rock music industries during the 1970s, and the co-founder (alongside Paiboon Damrongchaitham) of GMM Grammy, a media conglomerate entertainment company in Thailand. Due to his influence, Buddhinan is considered to have ushered in a new era in the music industry of Thailand.

== Early life ==
Rewat Buddhinan was born on September 5, 1948 in Bangkok. He was the fourth of six children born to Lieutenant commander Tawee and Obchai Buddhinan. He also had one younger brother from a different mother, Direk Buddhinan (Tong). He began his education at La-orutis Demonstration School. He finished secondary school at Saint Gabriel's College and received a bachelor's degree in Economics from Thammasat University.

== Personal life ==
Buddhinan married Arunya Sitthiprasert, a classmate from the Faculty of Liberal Arts, Thammasat University, in 1974. They have two daughters, Suthasinee and Sidarat.

== Death ==
Buddhinan was ill with brain cancer and went to the United States for treatment for about 5 months. When his condition improved, the doctor allowed him to return home. After returning to Thailand for about 2 months, his condition worsened again. Buddhinan was treated at Samitivej Hospital for 3 months. Buddhinan died on October 27, 1996 at the age of 48.

His cremation ceremony was held at Wat Phra Si Mahathat on February 17, 1997.

== Discography ==
=== Studio albums ===
- Ter 1 (เต๋อ 1) (1983)
- Ter 2 (เต๋อ 2) (1985)
- Ter 3 (เต๋อ 3) (1986)
- If You Like It, You Say You Like It. (ชอบก็บอกว่าชอบ) (1987)

=== Compilation albums ===
- Let's Sing (เรามาร้องเพลงกัน) (1982)
- International Youth (เยาวชนสากล) (1985)
