= Carabao discography =

Carabao discography is a discography for Thai rock band Carabao.

== Studio albums ==
There are 28 official studio albums, released from 1981 to 2013.

Year	Name in Thai	Transcription	English
1981	ลุงขี้เมา	Lung Khii Maw	The Drunken Old Man
1982	แป๊ะขายขวด	Pae Khaai Khuat	The Old Bottle Collector
1983	วณิพก	Waniphok	The Wandering Minstrel
1983	ท. ทหารอดทน	Th. Thahaan Ot Thon	The Long-suffering Soldier
1984	เมดอินไทยแลนด์	Made In Thailand	Made In Thailand
1985	อเมริโกย	Ameerikooi	Greedy Americans
1986	ประชาธิปไตย	Prachaathippatai	Democracy
1987	เวลคัมทูไทยแลนด์	Welcome To Thailand	Welcome To Thailand
1988	ทับหลัง	Thap Lang	The Lintel
1990	ห้ามจอดควาย	Haam Chot Khwaai	No Buffalo Parking
1991	วิชาแพะ	Wi Chaa Pae	The Scapegoat Lessons
1992	สัจจะ ๑๐ ประการ	Satcha Sip Prakan	The 10 Commandments
1993	ช้างไห้	Chang Hai	The Lamenting Elephants
1994	คนสร้างชาติ	Khon Saang Chaat	The Nation Builders
1995	แจกกล้วย	Chaek Kluai...	Serving Bananas...
1995	หากหัวใจยังรักควาย	Haak Huachai Yang Rak Khwaai	Still Love Buffaloes
1997	เส้นทางสายปลาแดก	Senthaang Saai Plaa Daek	The Route Of Plaa Daek
1997	เช ยังไม่ตาย	Che Yang Mai Taai	Che Is Still Alive
1998	อเมริกันอันธพาล	Ameerikan Anthaphaan	The Scoundrelly Americans
1998	พออยู่พอกิน	Phoo Juu Phoo Kin	Life On The Subsistence Level
2000	เซียมหล่อตือ	Siam Lor Tue	The Good-looking Siamese Pig
2001	สาวเบียร์ช้าง	Sao Bia Chang	Chang Beer Girl
2002	นักสู้ผู้ยิ่งใหญ่	Nak Soo Poo Ying Yai	The Great Fighter
2005	สามัคคีประเทศไทย	Samakki Thailand	Thailand United
2007	๒๕ ปี ลูกลุงขี้เมา	25 Pee Luk Lung Khee Mao	25 Years - Child Of The Drunken Old Man
2009	โฮะ	Ho	Mixing(In Lanna Language)
2011	กำลังใจคาราบาว 30 ปี	Gamlang Chai 30 Pee	Support For 30th Anniversary
2013	สวัสดีประเทศไทย	Sawadii Phrathet Thai	Hello Thailand

== Special Albums ==
- 2003 - เมดอินไทยแลนด์ ภาค 2546 สังคายนา - Made in Thailand Paak 2546 Sang-Kai-Na - Made in Thailand Version 2003
- 2004 - ชุด โฟล์ค 'บาว - Folk Bao. 12 hits, CD + Karaoke-VCD, acoustic version, with Aed, Lek, Thierry. Dec. 2004
- 2005 - หนุ่มบาว–สาวปาน - Num Bao-Sao Parn - Young Man Bao, Young Woman Parn. With guest singer Parn Thanaporn (RS Promotion)
- 2007 - Ruam Hit 25 Pee - Bao Benjapes. 25 songs + 5 bonus tracks. 2 CDs. The 25 Years Anniversary Compilation (Nov. 2007).
- 2007 - Carabao & Parn - ชุด หนุ่มบาว-สาวปาน สมานฉันท์ 1'000'000 + Copies Celebration Noom Bao, Sao Parn. 14 tracks, CD + Karaoke-VCD, 19 Dec. 2007 (RS)
- 2008 - Carabao & Parn - อัลบั้ม หนุ่มบาว Noom Bao - new version! 12 songs, CD + Karaoke-VCD. 20 Feb. 2008. (RS)
- 2008 - Carabao - อัลบั้ม หนุ่มบาว Remix - Vol.1, CD + Karaoke-VCD, Hip-Hop, Dance, R&B, 10 Tracks. 8 April 2008.
- 2008 - Carabao 3-Cha - คา ราบาว 3 ช่า รอบ นี้ ผี บ้า รอบ หน้า ผี บอก Rop Nii Pii Baa Rop Naa Pii Bok . CD + Karaoke-VCD - 13 tracks, 27 Nov. 2008.
- 2009 - Carabao - Hip Hop & Dance - Vol.1, CD + Karaoke-VCD + MD, 10 Tracks (e.g.: "Mae Sai" in Dance, "Duen Penn" in R&B, "Talae Jai", "Surachai 3-Cha in Dance, etc.). Jan. 2009
- 2009 - Carabao - Hip Hop & Dance - Vol.2, CD + Karaoke-VCD + MD, 10 tracks (e.g.: "Rak Torrahod" in Hip-Hop, "Khon Jon Poo Ying Yai", " Wicha Pae", "Wanipok", "Bua Loy" in Dance, etc.) Jan. 2009
- 2009 - Carabao & Parn Thanaporn - Bao Parn Return (RS - Dec. 2009)

== Live albums ==
- 2008 - The Diary of Carabao, concert on 16 February 2008 at Bonanza Ranch Khao Yai, Pak Chong, Nakhon Ratchasima
- 2009 - 3 ช่าสามัคคี ตอน ลูกทุ่งแฟนตาเชีย - 3 Cha Saamakkhee Luk Thung Fantasia - Cha-Cha-Cha in union with Luk Thung Fantasia, concert on 31 May 2009 at Impact Arena, Muang Thong Thani, Nonthaburi with guest singers of the Thai singing contest show Academy Fantasia and Sek Loso
- 2010 - Bao Parn Big Match Concert, concert on 20 March 2010 at Muang Thong Thani Stadium, Nonthaburi. Guests: Thaitanium, Girly Berry, Nattawut Skidjai, Aun Sripan, Pong Lang Sa On
- 2013 - เขียว คาราบาว: บันทึกการแสดงสดคอนเสิร์ต 60 ปี - Kiew Carabao - 60th Anniversary Concert, concert on 5 May 2013 at Chalermkrung Theatre, Bangkok. Guests: Hope, Seepuek Khondarnkwien, Pao Barabao
- 2014 - Rock Never Dies ควาย Ever Dance - Rock Never Dies Kwai Ever Dance, concert on 9 November 2013 in Sattahip, Chonburi. Guests: Laem Morrison, Olarn Promjai, Kitti, Sek Loso, Kotee Aramboy
