= Tata Young discography =

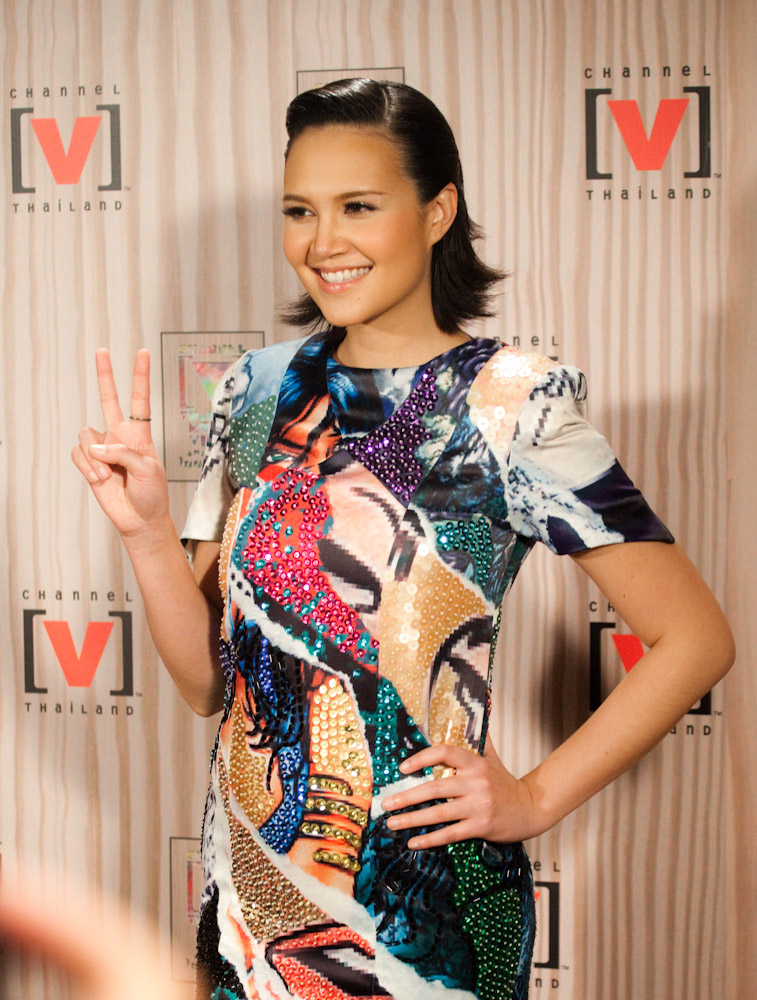
- Tata Young at the Channel [V] Thailand Music Video Awards, August 2009 Thailand
- Studio albums: 9
- Extended plays: 2
- Soundtrack albums: 1
- Compilation albums: 11
- Singles: 34

This is the discography of Thai singer Tata Young. In her native country Thailand, she has sold over 1 million units albums. Her expanded discography consists of nine studio albums since 1995, having released three albums in English, eleven compilation albums, two extended plays, one soundtrack and 34 singles.

== Albums ==
=== Studio albums ===
Title	Album details	Peak chart positions	Certifications
Title	Album details	THA	Certifications
Amita Tata Young	Released: March 31, 1995; Label: GMM Grammy; Formats: CD	1	THAI: 50x Platinum
Amazing TATA	Released: November 6, 1997; Label: GMM Grammy; Formats: CD, digital download	1	THAI: Platinum
Tata Young	Released: September 27, 2001; Label: BEC-TERO/Sony BMG; Formats: CD, cassette	1	THAI: Platinum
Real TT	Released: August 8, 2003; Label: BEC-TERO/Sony BMG; Formats: CD, cassette, digital download	1	
I Believe	Released: February 25, 2004; Label: Sony BMG/Columbia Records; Formats: CD, cassette, digital download	1	THAI: 40x Platinum
Dangerous TATA	Released: July 26, 2005; Label: Sony BMG; Formats: CD, cassette, digital download	1	
Temperature Rising	Released: August 24, 2006; Label: Sony BMG; Formats: CD, digital download	1	
One Love	Released: March 6, 2008; Label: Sony BMG; Formats: CD, digital download	1	
Ready for Love	Released: August 25, 2009; Label: Sony BMG; Formats: CD, digital download	1	

=== Compilation albums ===
Title	Album details
1,000,000 Copies Celebration	Released: August 1995; Label: GMM Grammy; Formats: CD
6.2.12	Released: December 26, 1995; Label: GMM Grammy; Formats: CD
Mos & Tata	Released: January 23, 1997; Label: GMM Grammy; Formats: CD, digital download
TATA Remix	Released: April 2, 1998; Label: GMM Grammy; Formats: CD, digital download
The Very Best of TATA	Released: January, 2000; Label: GMM Grammy; Formats: CD
Real Love	Released: April 1, 2004; Label: BEC-TERO/Sony BMG; Formats: CD
Best of Tata Young	Released: May 25, 2006; Label: Sony BMG; Formats: CD, digital download
The Collection	Released: June 1, 2008; Label: Sony BMG; Formats: CD
The Love of Tata Young	Released: August 20, 2009; Label: Sony BMG; Formats: CD
The Ultimate Remix	Released: March 23, 2010; Label: Sony BMG; Formats: CD, digital download
On the Top: The Ultimate Collection	Released: July 20, 2011; Label: Sony BMG; Formats: CD
Best of Tata young	Released: May 30, 2013; Label: GMM Grammy; Formats: CD

=== Soundtrack albums ===
Title	Album details
O-Negative	Released: October 22, 1998; Label: GMM Grammy; Formats: CD

=== Extended plays ===
Title	Album details
Happy Birthday	Released: July, 1997; Label: GMM Grammy; Formats: CD
Dhoom Dhoom	Released: March 2, 2005; Label: King/Platia Entertainment; Formats: CD, digital download

== Singles ==
Single	Year	Peak chart positions					Album
Single	Year	THA	IND	INA	HKG	JPN	Album
"โอ๊ะ…โอ๊ย"	1995	1	—	—	—	—	Amita Tata Young
"พรุ่งนี้ไม่สาย"	1995	1	—	—	—	—	Amita Tata Young
"รบกวนมารักกัน"	1995	1	—	—	—	—	Amita Tata Young
"ขอได้ไหม"	1995	1	—	—	—	—	Amita Tata Young
"ซักกะนิด"	1997	1	—	—	—	—	Amazing TATA
"ขอถามสักหน่อย"	1997	1	—	—	—	—	Amazing TATA
"รักเธอได้ไหม"	1997	20	—	—	—	—	Amazing TATA
"ช็อต"	2001	1	—	—	—	—	Tata Young
"อา-โบ-เด-เบ"	2001	1	—	—	—	—	Tata Young
"Super แฟน" ("Super Man")	2003	6	—	—	—	—	Real TT
"อยากเก็บเธอไว้ทั้งสองคน" ("I Need the Both of You")	2003	1	—	—	—	—	Real TT
"อย่าถือสา"	2003	—	—	—	—	—	Real TT
"อีกนิดนะ"	2003	17	—	—	—	—	Real TT
"ผิดไหมที่ฉันไม่กลับไปรักเธอ"	2003	1	—	—	—	—	Real TT
"Sexy, Naughty, Bitchy"	2004	1	*	1	1	1	I Believe
"I Believe"	2004	1	—	1	1	1	I Believe
"Cinderella"	2004	1	—	—	—	—	I Believe
"I Think of You"	2004	1	—	—	—	—	I Believe
"Dhoom Dhoom"	2005	1	1	1	—	—	Dhoom Dhoom
"Dangerous" (feat. Thaitanium)	2005	1	—	—	—	—	Dangerous TATA
"Shining" ("เธอคือ") (feat. Nop Pornchamni)	2005	3	—	—	—	—	Dangerous TATA
"Completely" ("ยอม")	2005	4	—	—	—	—	Dangerous TATA
"Hey Ma Ma Say"	2005	5	—	—	—	—	Dangerous TATA
"El Nin-YO!"	2006	1	—	1	1	1	Temperature Rising
"Zoom"	2006	7	—	—	—	—	Temperature Rising
"Come Rain Come Shine"	2006	13	—	—	—	—	Temperature Rising
"One Love"	2008	6	—	—	—	—	One Love
"Cause of Sadness" ("ต้นเหตุแห่งความเศร้า")	2008	10	—	—	—	—	One Love
"Living Creature... Without a Heart" ("สิ่งมีชีวิต...ไม่มีหัวใจ")	2008	18	—	—	—	—	One Love
"I'll Be Your First, Your Last, Your Everything"	2008	—	—	—	—	—	One Love
"Ready for Love"	2009	1	—	1	1	1	Ready for Love
"My Bloody Valentine"	2009	1	—	1	1	1	Ready for Love
"Mission Is You"	2009	5	—	—	—	—	Ready for Love
"Let's Play"	2011	—	—	—	—	—	Non-album single
"Where Do We Go"	2012	—	—	—	—	—	Non-album single
"ใครจะรู้"	2014	3	—	—	—	—	Non-album single
"เธอคนนั้นที่ฉันเห็นในกระจก"	2014	—	—	—	—	—	Non-album single
"ความรักกับความลับ"	2014	8	—	—	—	—	Non-album single
"เธอคือใคร"	2016	—	—	—	—	—	Non-album single
"สมควรไหมให้กลับไปรักเธอ"	2018	—	—	—	—	—	Non-album single
"คนเดิมคนนี้"	2018	19	—	—	—	—	Non-album single
"Love And Destiny"	2025	—	—	—	—	—	
"—" denotes releases that did not chart * denotes a song that charted but its peak position is unknown
