= Best of Tata Young =

Greatest hits album by Tata Young
- Released: May 25, 2006
- Label: Sony BMG

Tata Young chronology
Dangerous TATA (2005)	Best of Tata Young (2006)	Temperature Rising (2006)

Best of Tata Young (Thai: รวมฮิตเพลงที่ดีที่สุดของ 'ทาทา') is a 2006 greatest hits album by Thai pop singer Tata Young. It is a career-spanning, two-disc album, covering her years as a teen star at GMM Grammy (Amita Tata Young, 1,000,000 Copies Celebration, 6.2.12, Amazing Tata, O Negative, Red Bike Story), her switch to BEC-TERO (Tata Young, Real TT) and eventual signing to Sony BMG Music Entertainment (Dangerous Tata and her English language debut, I Believe). It was released ahead of her second English-language album, Temperature Rising.

== Track listing ==
=== Disc one ===
1. โอ๊ะ..โอ๊ย / Oo-Oui (Amita Tata Young)
2. รบกวนมารักกัน / Rob-Guan-Ma-Rak-Gun (Amita Tata Young)
3. พรุ่งนี้...ไม่สาย / Proong-Nee-Mai-Sai (Amita Tata Young)
4. ฉันรักเธอ / Chun-Rak-Tur (1,000,000 Copies Celebration)
5. ไม่รักตัวเอง / Mai-Rak-Tua-Eng (Amita Tata Young)
6. ขอได้ไหม / Kor-Dai-Mai (Amita Tata Young)
7. ซักกะนิด / Sak-Ga-Nid (Amazing TATA)
8. ขอถามซักหน่อย / Kor-Tam-Sak-Noi (Amazing TATA)
9. คนเดิมใจเดิม / Kon-Derm-Jai-Derm (Amazing TATA)
10. รักเธอได้ไหม / Rak-Tur-Dai-Mai (Amazing TATA)
11. แมลง / Ma-Laeng (Mos & Tata from Red Bike Story)
12. แค่เธอรักฉัน / Kae-Tur-Rak-Chun (O Negative)
13. คนแบบฉัน / Kon-Baab-Chun (6.2.12)

=== Disc two ===
1. สองคนหนึ่งคืน / Song-Kho- Nueng-Kuen (Dangerous Tata - Special Edition)
2. Hey Ma Ma Say (Dangerous Tata)
3. ยอม / Completely (Dangerous Tata)
4. Dangerous Feat. Thaitanium (Dangerous Tata)
5. Dhoom Dhoom (Dhoom)
6. Sexy, Naughty, Bitchy (I Believe)
7. I Believe (I Believe)
8. Cinderella (I Believe)
9. I think Of You (I Believe)
10. ช๊อต /Shot (Tata Young)
11. A-Bo-De-Be (Tata Young)
12. จะเก็บเอาไว้ให้เธอผู้เดียว /Ja-Geb-AO-Wai-Hai-Tur-Poo-Diew (Plaitein soundtrack)
13. อยากเก็บเธอไว้ทั้งสองคน /I Need The Both Of You (Real TT)
14. อีกนิดนะ / Eik-Nid-Na (Real TT)
15. Super แฟน (Superman) (Real TT)
