= Dhoom (soundtrack) =

Soundtrack album by Pritam
- Released: 16 July 2004
- Recorded: 2003–2004
- Studios: YRF Studios, Mumbai
- Genre: Feature film soundtrack
- Length: 34:47
- Language: Hindi
- Label: Saregama
- Producer: Aditya Chopra

Pritam chronology
| Raghu Romeo (2004) | Dhoom (2004) | Chocolate (2004) |

Dhoom is the soundtrack album to the 2004 film Dhoom directed by Sanjay Gadhvi and produced by Aditya Chopra under Yash Raj Films. The soundtrack featured seven songs composed by Pritam with lyrics written by Sameer and released on 16 July 2004 under the Saregama label. Upon release, the music was commercially successful and earned Pritam his maiden nomination for Filmfare Award for Best Music Director and other accolades.

== Background ==
The soundtrack and film score for Dhoom were composed by Pritam and Salim–Sulaiman, respectively, while Sameer wrote the lyrics for the songs. Sunidhi Chauhan, Shankar Mahadevan, Shaan, Shreya Ghoshal, Abhijeet Bhattacharya, Sowmya Raoh, Vasundhara Das, Kunal Ganjawala, Gayatri Ganjawala, KK and Indee, performed the vocals for the songs.

Dhoom is Pritam's third collaboration with Gadhvi after Tere Liye (2001) and Mere Yaar Ki Shaadi Hai (2002), where he shared credits with Jeet Gannguli (as Jeet–Pritam). He admitted that the music was the third important aspect, after action and comedy, while Gadhvi wanted the music to be racy as the film. He further added "The biggest problem of doing a Yash Raj film is their legacy of music [...] Their music has always been remembered. So that puts added pressure on you. You have to match the standards."

"Dilbara" was the first song to composed for the film, when the film was not even titled. During the music sittings with Chopra and Gadhvi, the former put the words "dhoom machale, dhoom machale, dhoom" as the hook line and melody of the song. Pritam, who did not remember the scratch lyrics, had immediately locked Chopra's hookline along with the rest of the crew members, approving Dhoom as the title for the film, and "Dhoom Machale" as the title song. In a 2022 interview to Film Companion, Pritam recalled that he used to bribe a factory worker in Saregama, by giving him sweets, to replace an older track with a newly remastered one.

Chopra had planned an English version for "Dhoom Machale" and brought the Thai American singer Tata Young to record it. At the recording studio, Young pronounced "dhoom" as "doom", as they intentionally removed the "dh" sound by Chopra for appeal. The addition of an English version, gave another dimension to the original title track, according to Pritam.

== Release ==
The album was first issued in CDs and cassettes under the Saregama label on 16 July 2004. When Yash Chopra launched the company's subsidiary music label YRF Music, the soundtrack to Dhoom was later distributed to digital platforms under the YRF label.

== Reception ==
"We never thought that Dhoom will become so big. I never thought [...] I remember the day Dhoom was releasing I was going to Shirdi and on the way I heard in 2 places – one was a car back horn with the Dhoom Machale tune and the other was somebody in Shirdi was singing it. Then I knew gaana toh popular hogaya. Dhoom was a great gig!"

— Pritam, on the popularity of the title song

According to the Indian trade website Box Office India, with around 22,00,000 units sold, this film's soundtrack album was the year's third highest-selling. Lata Sinha of The Telegraph noted that, "the music industry hit rock bottom until Yash Raj Films' Dhoom and its title song by Pritam spread like wildfire across the nation".

The track "Dhoom Dhoom" proved to be commercially successful, becoming the singer's most successful single in India. Its success prompted Young to release an extended play under the same title in 2005. Despite its success, Pritam was accused of plagiarism by Canadian songwriter Jesse Cook as his song "Mario Takes a Walk" from his album Gravity (1996) had similarities with "Dhoom Machale" and "Dhoom Dhoom".

The soundtrack's success prompted Pritam to becoming one of the leading music composers in the Hindi film industry. Pritam reprised his role as a composer for the forthcoming films in the franchise: Dhoom 2 (2006) and Dhoom 3 (2013).

== Track listing ==
All lyrics are written by Sameer; all music is composed by Pritam.

| No. | Title | Singer(s) | Length |
|---|---|---|---|
| 1. | "Dhoom Machale" | Sunidhi Chauhan, Shankar Mahadevan | 6:15 |
| 2. | "Shikdum" | Shaan, Shreya Ghoshal | 5:27 |
| 3. | "Dilbara" | Abhijeet, Sowmya Raoh | 4:32 |
| 4. | "Salaame" | Kunal Ganjawala, Vasundhara Das | 5:17 |
| 5. | "Shikdum" (The Bedroom Mix) | KK, Gayatri Ganjawala, Indee | 4:19 |
| 6. | "Dilbara" (Reprisal Edit) | Abhijeet, Sowmya Raoh, Abhishek Bachchan | 4:36 |
| 7. | "Dhoom Dhoom" | Tata Young | 3:21 |
| Total length: | | | 34:27 |

== Accolades ==
List of accolades received by Veer-Zaara
| Award | Date of ceremony (Note: Date is linked to the article about the awards held that year, wherever possible.) | Category | Recipient(s) and nominee(s) | Result | Ref(s) |
|---|---|---|---|---|---|
| Bollywood Movie Awards | 30 April 2005 | Best Music Director | Pritam | Nominated | |
| Bollywood Movie Awards | 30 April 2005 | Best Female Playback Singer | Sunidhi Chauhan for "Dhoom Machale" | Nominated | |
| Bollywood Movie Awards | 30 April 2005 | Best Female Playback Singer | Tata Young for "Dhoom Dhoom" | Nominated | |
| Filmfare Awards | 26 May 2005 | Best Music Director | Pritam | Nominated | |
| Filmfare Awards | 26 May 2005 | Best Female Playback Singer | Sunidhi Chauhan for "Dhoom Machale" | Nominated | |
| Global Indian Film Awards | 25 January 2005 | Best Music Director | Pritam | Won | |
| Global Indian Film Awards | 25 January 2005 | Best Lyrics | Sameer for "Dhoom Machale" | Won | |
| Global Indian Film Awards | 25 January 2005 | Best Female Playback Singer | Sunidhi Chauhan for "Dhoom Machale" | Nominated | |
| International Indian Film Academy Awards | 11 June 2005 | Best Music Director | Pritam | Nominated | |
| International Indian Film Academy Awards | 11 June 2005 | Best Female Playback Singer | Sunidhi Chauhan for "Dhoom Machale" | Nominated | |
| Screen Awards | 18 January 2005 | Best Music Director | Pritam | Nominated | |
| Screen Awards | 18 January 2005 | Best Background Music | Salim–Sulaiman | Nominated | |
| Zee Cine Awards | 18 January 2005 | Best Background Score | Salim–Sulaiman | Nominated | |
| Zee Cine Awards | 18 January 2005 | Best Female Playback Singer | Sunidhi Chauhan for "Dhoom Machale" | Won | |
| Zee Cine Awards | 18 January 2005 | Best Song of the Year | "Dhoom Machale" | Won | |
