= Dhoom Dhoom (EP) =

EP by Tata Young
- Released: 7 March 2005
- Recorded: 2004
- Genre: Pop
- Length: 19:27
- Label: Sony Music BEC Tero Entertainment Co. Ltd./Platia Entertainment Inc.
- Producer: Hitvision

Tata Young chronology
I Believe (2004)	Dhoom Dhoom (2005)	Dangerous TATA (2005)

Dhoom Dhoom is an EP by Tata Young, released in 2005 after the success of the Bollywood film Dhoom. Young sang the leading song, "Dhoom Dhoom", which shot to number one in the music charts of many Asian countries.

The EP features the following songs on the Japanese release, where Tata Young has experienced a great deal of success. This EP, as well as Tata Young's older English album I Believe and her newer album Temperature Rising can still be found in some Japanese CD stores.

== Track listing ==
No.	Title	Writer(s)	Producer(s)	Length
1.	"Dhoom Dhoom"	Asif Ali Baig	Salim-Sulaiman, Jim Satya, Sandeep Shirodkar	4:21
2.	"Sexy, Naughty, Bitchy" (Japanese Version)	David Clewett, Ivar Linsinki, Savan Kotecha, Japanese lyrics: Miyako Hashimoto	Hitvision	3:31
3.	"I Think Of You" (Japanese Version)	Robin Scoffield, Reed Vertelney, Japanese lyrics: M. Hashimoto	Hitvision	3:43
4.	"I Believe" (Japanese Version)	Martin Ankelius, Henrik Andersson, Carola Häggkvist, Japanese lyrics: M. Hashimoto	Hitvision	3:21
5.	"I Need The Both Of You" (Thanks Track)	Wirote Watinpongpon		4:31
Total length:				19:27

Japanese DVD - Video Clips -
No.	Title	Length
1.	"Dhoom Dhoom"
2.	"Sexy, Naughty, Bitchy" (New Version)
3.	"I Believe" (New Version)
