= Ready for Love =

Ready for Love may refer to:

== Film and television ==
- Ready for Love (film), a 1934 American romantic comedy
- Ready for Love (TV series), a 2013 American reality series

== Music ==
=== Albums ===
- Ready for Love (album), by Tata Young, or the title song, 2009
- Ready for Love, by John P. Hammond, 2003

=== Songs ===
- "Ready for Love" (Adam Brand song), 2009
- "Ready for Love" (Blackpink song), 2022
- "Ready for Love" (Cascada song), 2006
- "Ready for Love" (Mott the Hoople song), 1972; covered by Bad Company, 1974
- "Ready for Love", by Gary Moore from After the War, 1989
- "Ready for Love", by India.Arie from Acoustic Soul, 2001
- "Ready for Love", by the Pixies from Beneath the Eyrie, 2019
- "Ready for Love", by Roger Daltrey from Can't Wait to See the Movie, 1987

== See also ==
- Are You Ready for Love (disambiguation)
- "I'm Ready for Love", a 1966 song by Martha and the Vandellas
