= O Negative (disambiguation) =

O Negative refers to blood group O, Rh-negative, in the ABO and Rh blood group systems.

O Negative may also refer to:

- O^{−}, an oxygen ion with a charge of -1
- O-Negative (1998 film), a 1998 Thai film
- O-Negative (TV series), a 2016 Thai TV series adaptation of the 1998 film
- O Negative (2015 film), a 2015 Canadian short film
- Type O Negative, an American heavy metal band
