= The Eye 3 =

The Eye 3 can refer to the following:

- The Eye 10, the third movie of the Asian horror series by The Pang Brothers.
- The Eye 3, Asian fantasy-horror by Hark Tsui.
