= Ray MacDonald =

Thai actor (1977–2026)

- เรย์ แมคโดนัลด์
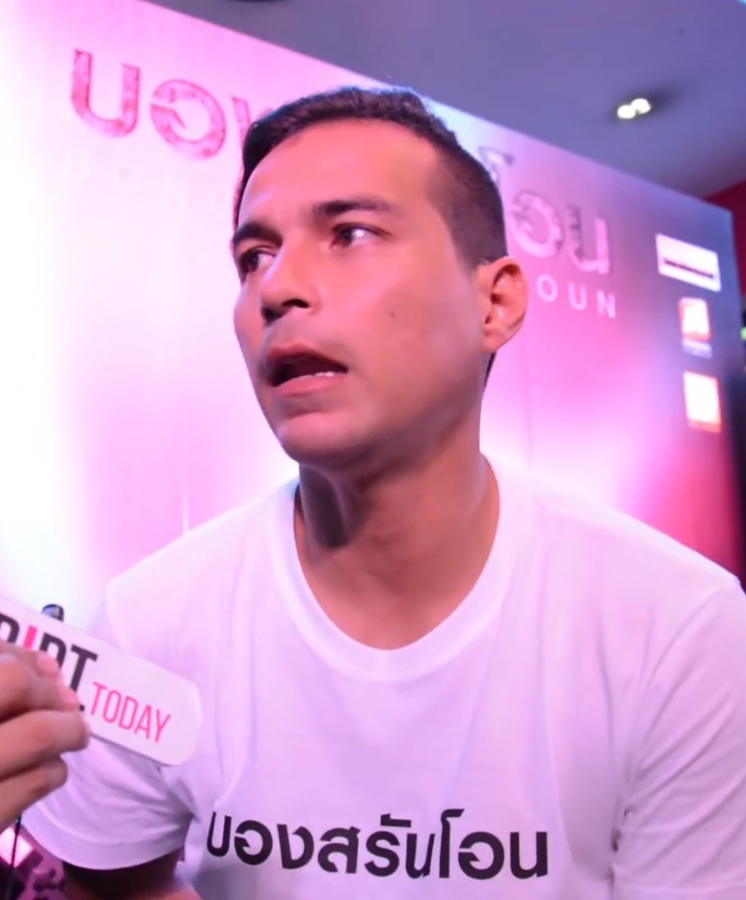
- MacDonald in 2015
- Born: 21 May 1977; Roi Et, Thailand
- Died: 19 August 2026 (aged 49); Prawet, Bangkok, Thailand
- Occupations: Actor; Host; YouTuber
- Years active: 1997–2026
- Spouse: Sirinya Jintanawararak (m. 2018)
- Children: 1

Ray MacDonald (Thai: เรย์ แมคโดนัลด์; 21 May 1977 – 19 August 2026) was a Thai actor, adventurer and television presenter. He won Best Actor awards at the Thailand National Film Association Awards in 1997 and 1998 for his roles in Fun Bar Karaoke, the debut feature by Pen-Ek Ratanaruang, and O-Negative, which co-starred Tata Young. MacDonald was also featured in Fake and the Pang Brothers' The Eye 10.

MacDonald portrayed Dark Ultraman in the PROJECT ULTRAMAN television series.

In 2007, he co-starred in the supernatural thriller, Opapatika.

MacDonald died on 19 August 2026, at the age of 49.

== Filmography ==
Year	Title	Role
1997	Fun Bar Karaoke	Noi
1998	O-Negative	Art
1999	Khon jorn	Daeng
2003	Fake	Soong
2004	Six	Khan
2005	The Eye 10	Chongkwai
2007	Opapatika	Aroot
2009	Dear Galileo	Tum
2009	Phobia 2	
2010	From Pakse with Love	
2010	In the Shadow of the Naga	Sing
2012	3AM	Thee
2012	Crazy Crying Lady	Boy
2014	3AM Part 2	Rang
2026	Behind the Screens	

== MC ==
Television

- 2013: สุดเขตเทศกาล On Air Channel 9
- 2013: 48 ชั่วโมง On Air Channel 5
- 2014: 72 ขั่วโมง On Air Channel 5
- 2015: ครัวคริตจานด่วน On Air Channel 3 (2015-)
- 2015: TT RIDER On Air One 31
- 2016: TT RIDER 2 On Air One 31
- 2017: ติดเกาะ On Air true inside
- 2017: SoFa[R] So Good (produce a show) On Air true inside
- 2018: ติดเขา (produce a show) On Air true inside

Online

- 2018: FOOD TRIBE ไป-ล่า-กิน On Air Line tv (2018)
- 2019: ROAMING" EP.1 หัวลำโพง กรุงเทพฯ - เวียงจันทน์ On Air YouTube:Rayron : เร่ร่อน (12/9/2019-)
- 2021: อีสานคลาสสิคทริป EP.1 On Air YouTube:Rayron : เร่ร่อน (4/10/2021-)
