= One Love (Tata Young album) =

- US and UK Cover

Studio album by Tata Young
- Released: March 3, 2008 (Thailand)
- Recorded: 2008
- Genre: String
- Length: 38:51 (Album)
- Label: Sony BMG

Tata Young chronology
Temperature Rising (2006)	One Love (2008)	Ready For Love (2009)

Alternative covers
- Thailand Cover

Alternative cover
- Pre-Ordered Cover

Singles from One Love
- 1. "One Love" Released: February 14, 2008; 2. "Cause of Sadness" Released: March 28, 2008; 3. "Living Creature... Without a Heart" Released: October 17, 2008; 4. "I'll Be Your First, Your Last, Your Everything" Released: November 20, 2008

One Love is the eighth studio album by Thai singer Tata Young, released on March 3, 2008. The first single from the album, "One Love", was released on February 14, 2008. The second single, "Cause of Sadness", was later released. One Love is Tata Young's first studio album since her seventh studio album success Temperature Rising in 2006 and her first all Thai album in 3 years since her sixth studio album Dangerous TATA in 2005

== Track listing ==
1. One Love
2. Boom Bam (บุ่มบ่าม)
3. Cause of Sadness (ต้นเหตุแห่งความเศร้า)
4. Good Time
5. Please (ได้โปรด)
6. Kidding (อำ)
7. Living Creature... Without a Heart (สิ่งมีชีวิต...ไม่มีหัวใจ)
8. I'll Be Your First, Your Last, Your Everything
9. Unwind Wind (สายลมที่มองไม่เห็น)
10. Our Home (บ้านเดียวกัน)

== Music video ==
Tata Young music video was premiered on 14 February 2008.

Pictures from the shoot of the music video have leaked onto the internet on February 12, 2008, which depict the pop singer walking around in the fields of hay in Thailand. Tata is wearing a light pink dress throughout the duration of the video.
