= Opapatika =

2007 film

- The Thai theatrical poster.
- Directed by: Thanakorn Pongsuwan
- Written by: Thanakorn Pongsuwan
- Produced by: Prachya Pinkaew; Sukanya Vongsthapat
- Starring: Leo Putt; Somchai Kemklad; Chakrit Yaemnam; Ray MacDonald; Athip Nana; Nirut Sirijanya; Khemupsorn Sirisukha
- Narrated by: Pongpat Wachirabanjong
- Distributed by: Sahamongkol Film International
- Release date: 23 October 2007 (Thailand)
- Running time: 101 minutes
- Country: Thailand
- Language: Thai
- Box office: $1.1 million

Opapatika (Thai: โอปปาติก เกิดอมตะ) is a 2007 Thai action film. It is directed by Thanakorn Pongsuwan and stars Pongpat Wachirabanjong, Leo Putt, Somchai Kemklad, Chakrit Yaemnam, Ray MacDonald, Athip Nana, Nirut Sirijanya and Khemupsorn Sirisukha

== Plot ==
A narrator explains that according to Buddhist belief the evolution of birth can be divided into three forms:

- Sangsethaca: To be born amongst rot and decay, as a worm or maggot.
- Anthaca: To be born from an egg, in the various forms of birds.
- Chalaphucha: To be conceived in the womb as a human or other mammal.

Then there is a fourth form, Opapatika, which goes against Buddhist beliefs because it involves suicide: a class of supernatural beings who are born out of suicide. However, the powers that they gain also have a negative effect.

The narrator, it is revealed, is Thuwachit (Pongpat Wachirabanjong), the loyal mortal henchman for the elderly Sadok (Nirut Sirijanya), an Opapatika who is quickly decaying and needs to feast on the flesh of other Opapatikas in order to sustain himself. He sends Thuwachit out to capture others.

Four Opapatikas remain:

- Paisol (Chakrit Yaemnam), a Storng assassin who must bear all the scars and wounds of his victims.
- Jiras (Somchai Khemklad), an immortal Opapatika, and the most powerful of them all. He considers his immortality a curse.
- Aruth (Ray MacDonald), an invincible fighter by night, but weak in the daylight.
- Ramil (Athip Nana), an adrenaline-fueled daredevil who can project a monstrous, ghostly creature to do his bidding.

Investigating the Opapatikas is a private detective, Techit (Leo Putt), whom Sadok transforms into an Opapatika. Techit has the psychic powers of a mind reader, but his power costs him the use of his five senses.

Techit is teamed up with Thuwachit, who leads a vast paramilitary army against the four Opapatika. The four immortals are also mysteriously drawn to a woman, Pran (Khemupsorn Sirisukha).

== Reception ==
=== Box office ===
Opapatika opened on October 23, 2007 in Thailand cinemas. It was the No. 1 movie at the domestic box office for two weeks, earning US$1,091,851 during that time.

=== Critical response ===
The film was poorly received by critics in the English-language press.

Bangkok Post film critic Kong Rithdee characterised the film as dull and overly violent, summed up as "an ambitious film that ends up merely an exercise, and not a very memorable one at that."

The Nation was more upbeat, saying the film had a strong ensemble cast and compelling story, but was undermined by poorly framed action and inadequate lighting. "If it hadn't been so dour and serious all the time, and had better presented action sequences, Opapatika could have been a contender," the newspaper's reviewer said.

The film review blog Asian Cinema - While on the Road was harsher, calling Opapatika "loud, pointless and witless ... this has a body count that could fill a football stadium ... but not one of these myriad of corpses would evince even a slight care from you – just fodder for the threshing machine of CGI death."

== Production ==
Production stills from Opapatika first surfaced in 2005, and the film spent much time in post-production.

The title is derived from the Pali wording for the Tripitaka, the Buddhist scripture.
