= Khon Sang Chat =

คนสร้างชาติ (Khon Sang Chat) or รุ่นคนสร้างชาติ (Run Khon Sang Chat)

Studio album by Carabao
- Released: October 1994
- Recorded: August 1993
- Genre: Comedy Rock • Phleng phuea chiwit • Alternative Rock
- Length: n/a
- Label: Warner Music Thailand (October 1994)
- Producer: Carabao

Carabao chronology
Chang Hai (1993)	คนสร้างชาติ (Khon Sang Chat) or รุ่นคนสร้างชาติ (Run Khon Sang Chat) (1994)	Chaek Kluai... (1995)

Alternative cover

Khon Sang Chat (คนสร้างชาติ) or Run Khon Sang Chat (รุ่นคนสร้างชาติ) was the fourteenth album by Thai rock band Carabao. It was released in October 1994.

== Track listing ==
Track	Thai	Transcription
01	หลวงพ่อคูณ	Luangpho Khun
02	คนสร้างชาติ	Khon Sang Chat
03	พยานป่า	Phayan Pa
04	ตาดี	Ta Di
05	20 ปีคาราวาน	Yisip Pi Kharawan
06	จ่าง แซ่ตั้ง	Chang Saetang
07	เปาปุ้นจิ้นกับคนตัดไม้	Paobunchin Kap Khon Tat Mai
08	ขี่ไก่	Khi Kai
09	ลำพูน	Lamphun
10	ฝาโลง	Fa Long
11	ในนามแห่งความรัก	Nai Nam Haeng Khwamrak
