= Chaek Kluai... =

แจกกล้วย (Chaek Kluai...)

Studio album by Carabao
- Released: 1995
- Recorded: 1995
- Genre: Soft Rock • Folk • Phleng phuea chiwit • Luk thung
- Length: n/a
- Label: Warner Music Thailand (August 1995)
- Producer: Carabao

Carabao chronology
Roon Khon Saang Chaat (1994)	แจกกล้วย (Chaek Kluai...) (1995)	Haak Huachai Yaang Rak Kwaai (1995)

Alternative cover

Cheak Kluai ... (MIT, แจกกล้วย) was the fifteenth album by Thai rock band Carabao. It was released in August 1995.

== Track listing ==
Track	Thai	Transcription
01	กำนันผู้ใหญ่บ้าน	Kham Nan Phoo Yaai Baan
02	ค้างคาวกินกล้วย	Khaang Khaao Khin Kluai
03	ยูคา	Yoo Khaa
04	เงินกร่อย	Nguen Kloei
05	เดินขบวน	Duean Kha Buan
06	สเปโต	Sapetoe
07	จราจร จลาจล	Cha Laa Chorn Cha Laa Chol
08	สงครามป่า	Song Kraam Baa
09	ประเวียน บุญหนัก	Prawier Boonnak
10	เอาดีให้ได้	Aoo Dee Haai Daai
