= Prachathippatai =

ประชาธิปไตย (Prachathippatai)

Studio album by Carabao
- Released: 1986
- Recorded: 1986
- Genres: Hard rock Phleng phuea chiwit
- Length: n/a
- Labels: Amigo (1986); Warner Music Thailand (2011)
- Producer: Carabao

Carabao chronology
Amerikoi (1985)	ประชาธิปไตย (Prachathippatai) (1986)	Welcome To Thailand (1987)

Alternative cover

Prachathippatai (Thai: ประชาธิปไตย; "Democracy") is the seventh album by Thai rock band Carabao. It was released in 1986.

== Track listing ==
Track	Thai	Transcription
01	ตาตี๋	Ta Ti
02	ประชาธิปไตย	Prachathippatai
03	ผู้ทน	Pho Thon
04	เจ้าตาก	Cho Tak (Taksin)
05	พ่อ	Pho (The Father)
06	ถึกควายทุยภาค 7	Thuek Khwai Thui Phak Chet
07	มหาจำลองรุ่น 7	Maha Chamlong Run Chet
08	มรดกเฮงซวย	Moradok Hengsuai
09	วันเด็ก	Wan Dek (Children's Day)
10	ค.ควาย ค.คน	Kho Khwai Kho Khon
