= Are You Ready for Love (disambiguation) =

"Are You Ready for Love" is a song by Elton John from his 1979 EP The Thom Bell Sessions.

The phrase may also refer to:

- "Are You Ready for Love", a song by Audio Adrenaline from Until My Heart Caves In, 2005
- Are You Ready for Love?, a 2006 British film directed by Helen M. Grace
