= Num Bao–Sao Parn =

หนุ่มบาว-สาวปาน (Num Bao–Sao Parn)

Studio album by Carabao and Thanaphorn Waekprayoon
- Released: 2005
- Recorded: 2005
- Genre: Soft Rock • Phleng phuea chiwit
- Length: n/a
- Label: RS Public Company Limited • Warner Music Thailand (2005)
- Producer: Carabao

Alternative cover

Num Bao–Sao Parn (Thai: หนุ่มบาว-สาวปาน) is the special album by Thai rock band Carabao with Parn-Thanaphorn Waekprayoon released in 2005. The popularity of this album has led to the succeeding album Bao-Parn Return (บาว-ปาน รีเทิร์น), which was released in 2009.

== Track listing ==
Track	Thai	Transcription
01	หนุ่มบาว-สาวปาน	Num Bao–Sao Parn
02	ดอกไผ่บาน	Dok Phai Ban
03	เสียตัว อย่าเสียใจ	Sia Tua Ya Sia Chai
04	บัวผัน (ถึกควายทุยภาคพิเศษ)	Bua Phan (Special Thuek Khwai Thui).
05	รุ่นใหญ่	Run Yai
06	สุมไฟรัก	Sum Fai Rak
07	วิญญาณไม่ขาย	Winyan Mai Khai
08	เหงา...ไม่เข้าใจ	Ngao...Mai Khao Chai
09	มนต์รักผีเสื้อ	Mon Rak Phisuea
10	ไปก่อนตาย	Pai Kon Tai
