= Satcha Sip Prakan =

สัจจะ ๑๐ ประการ (Satcha Sip Prakan)

Studio album by Carabao
- Released: 1992
- Recorded: 1992
- Genre: Phleng phuea chiwit
- Length: n/a
- Label: D-Day Entertainment (1992); Warner Music Thailand (2011)
- Producer: Carabao

Carabao chronology
| Wi Chaa Pae (1991) | สัจจะ ๑๐ ประการ (Satcha Sip Prakan) (1992) | Chang Hai (1993) |

Alternative cover

Satcha Sip Prakan (สัจจะ ๑๐ ประการ) was the twelfth album by Thai rock band Carabao. It was released in 1992.

== Track listing ==
| Track | Thai | Transcription |
|---|---|---|
| 01 | สัจจะ ๑๐ ประการ | Satcha Sip Prakan |
| 02 | ชนะภัย | Chana Phai |
| 03 | ธนาคารโลก | Thanakhan Lok |
| 04 | น้ำ | Nam |
| 05 | ช้าก่อน | Cha Kon |
| 06 | สามช่าจงเจริญ | Sam Cha Chong Charoen |
| 07 | หนูเล็ก | Nu Lek |
| 08 | ป๋าตี๋ | Pa Ti |
| 09 | ชวนป๋วย | Chuan Puai |
| 10 | ตามดูผู้แทน | Tam Du Phuthaen |
