= The Eye 10 =

2005 Hong Kong-Thai film by the Pang brothers

- Theatrical release poster
- 見鬼10
- Directed by: Pang brothers
- Written by: Pang brothers Mark Wu
- Produced by: Peter Chan; Lawrence Cheng; Jojo Hui
- Starring: Bolin Chen; Kris Gu; Bongkoj Khongmalai; Isabella Leong; Ray MacDonald; Kate Yeung
- Cinematography: Decha Srimantra; Chan Chi-ying
- Edited by: Curran Pang
- Music by: Payont Term Sit
- Production company: Applause Pictures
- Distributed by: Mediacorp Raintree Pictures
- Release date: 25 March 2005
- Running time: 86 minutes
- Countries: Hong Kong; Thailand
- Languages: Cantonese; English; Thai

The Eye 10 (見鬼10), also known as The Eye Infinity and The Eye 3, is a 2005 Hong Kong–Thai supernatural comedy horror film directed by the Pang brothers. It starred Chen Bolin, Kate Yeung, Isabella Leong, Bongkoj Khongmalai, Ray MacDonald, and Kris Gu.

The film is the third instalment in a film trilogy, following The Eye and The Eye 2. The "10" in the Hong Kong version of the title refers to the number of rituals for making ghosts visible.

== Synopsis ==
Chong-kwai welcomes his friends Ted, May, Kofei, and April from Hong Kong to his home in Thailand. He shows them a book which describes a game of ten ways to see ghosts. Out of curiosity, they start playing and see ghosts.

When Kofei goes missing during the game after relieving himself at a tree in the woods, April stays behind in Thailand to try to find him, while Ted and May return to Hong Kong. April disappears too later.

Back in Hong Kong, Ted and May continue to encounter ghosts. Chong-kwai returns to the shop where he bought the book and learns that he and his friends have been cursed and they need to finish the game.

Ted and May return to Thailand and play the last part of the game. They enter a ghostly dimension and finally find Kofei. They also meet April, who has committed suicide after thinking that Kofei is dead. Kofei stays behind with April while Ted and May attempt to escape, but they end up trapped in another ghostly dimension.

The Ten Ways

There are ten ways listed in the film by which one may see a ghost:

1. Getting a corneal transplant from a person who can see ghosts (as seen in The Eye)
2. Attempting suicide while pregnant (as seen in The Eye 2)
3. Playing Ouija or a similar game
4. Tapping chopsticks on a bowl and offering food at a road intersection at night to attract hungry ghosts
5. Playing hide-and-seek at night while carrying a black cat
6. Rubbing dirt from a grave on your eyes
7. Opening an umbrella under shelter
8. Brushing your hair at midnight in front of a mirror
9. Bending over to look back between your legs
10. Sleeping in used traditional garments for the deceased

== Cast ==
- Kate Yeung as May
- Bolin Chen as Ted
- Isabella Leong as April
- Ray MacDonald as Chong-kwai
- Kris Gu as Kofei
- Bongkoj Khongmalai as the accident victim

== See also ==
- List of ghost films
