= Samakkhi Prathet Thai =

สามัคคีประเทศไทย (Samakkhi Thailand)

Studio album by Carabao
- Released: March 2005
- Recorded: January 2005
- Genre: Art Rock; Phleng phuea chiwit
- Label: Warner Music Thailand (January 2005)
- Producer: Carabao

Carabao chronology
Nak Soo Phoo Ying Yai (2002)	สามัคคีประเทศไทย (Samakkhi Thailand) (2005)	Luk Loong Khii Maw (2006)

Samakkhi Prathet Thai (Thai: สามัคคีประเทศไทย; lit. 'Unity of Thailand'), also known as Samakki Thailand, is the twenty-fourth studio album by Thai rock band Carabao. It was released in March 2005.

The album was released amid the resurgence of the South Thailand insurgency and promoted a message of national solidarity in many of its songs, including the eponymous track "Samakkhi Prathet Thai". One notable track, "Khwan Thai Chai Nueng Diao", which had been previously released as a single, was specifically written to appeal to audiences in the troubled southern provinces. The single version featured 43 guest artists, including Princess Ubol Ratana.

== Track listing ==
Track	Thai	Transcription
01	สามัคคีประเทศไทย	"Samakkhi Prathet Thai"
02	ฤกษ์ดาวเทียม	"Roek Daothiam"
03	สวนจตุจักร	"Suan Chatuchak"
04	ผีเสื้อราตรี	"Phisuea Ratri"
05	วิหคพลัดถิ่น	"Wihok Phlat Thin"
06	ขวานไทยใจหนึ่งเดียว	"Khwan Thai Chai Nueng Diao"
07	ดวงตาแห่งความรัก	"Duangta Haeng Khwamrak"
08	เสพตาย ขายคุก	"Sep Tai Khai Khuk"
09	ตำบลของหนู	"Tambon Khong Nu"
10	ปริญญาฝาส้วม	"Parinya Fa Suam"
11	ลูกผู้ชายหัวใจสองล้อ	"Lukphuchai Huachai Song Lo"
