= O-Negative (1998 film) =

- Film poster
- Directed by: Pinyo Roothum
- Written by: Vanich Charungkitanan; Euthana Mukdasanit
- Produced by: Euthana Mukdasanit
- Starring: Ray MacDonald; Tata Young; Shahkrit Yamnarm; Manaswee Krittanookul; Sriphan Chunechomboon
- Cinematography: Leng-Eui Wanchai
- Edited by: Sunit Asvinikul
- Music by: Phusit Laithong
- Distributed by: Grammy Film
- Release date: 30 October 1998
- Running time: 108 minutes
- Country: Thailand
- Language: Thai

O-Negative (Thai: รัก-ออกแบบไม่ได้) is a 1998 Thai romance drama film directed by Pinyo Roothum, and starring Ray MacDonald, Tata Young, Shahkrit Yamnarm, Manaswee Krittanookul, and Sriphan Chunechomboon.

The film follows a group of five college freshmen, all of whom have O-Negative blood, and their experiences with romance and heartbreak.

== Plot ==
This movie tells the story of the love between friends in a group, both as friendship and romantic love, and the development of their relationship from friends to lovers. Prim, Art, Puen, Fun, and Chomphoo are close friends in a group called "Negative," because all five members have blood type O. However, only Parim and Fun have Rh negative.

== Cast ==
- Ray MacDonald as Art
- Tata Young as Prim
- Shahkrit Yamnarm as Puen
- Sriphan Chunechomboon as Chomphoo
- Manaswee Krittanookul as Fun

== Reception ==
The movie magazine Movie Time reviewed: "O-Negative is considered a well-made Thai film. It doesn’t have a particularly novel storyline, but the way the film is presented is intriguing and manages to capture the audience’s attention from start to finish."

The film won The Surasawadi Royal Award for the Year 1998 for best adapted screenplay, and best cinematography, The 8th National Film Association "Suphan Hong" Awards for best movie, and the 7th Entertainment Critics' Association Awards for the Year 1998, also for best movie.

== Adaptations ==
The film was rebooted into a television series in 2016, and was broadcast in GMM 25 between November 30, 2016 to February 23, 2017.
