= Dhoom Dhoom =

Single by Tata Young

from the album Dhoom
- Released: 13 June 2004
- Recorded: 2004
- Genre: Filmi
- Length: 4:21
- Label: Yash Raj Music
- Songwriter: Pritam
- Producer: Aditya Chopra

"Dhoom Dhoom" (also "Dhoom Machao Dhoom" or "Doom Machale") is the title track and single composed by Pritam and sung by the pop singer, Tata Young for the 2004 film and album, Dhoom. Dhoom was released in August 2004, going on to win several awards and took on international fame. The track quickly soared high on Asian music charts in 2004 to 2005.

== Chart performance ==
The song was the singer's most successful single ever in India. It was a major hit, reaching #1 for several weeks to months in many Asian countries music charts. It was number one in various countries such as India, Thailand, Singapore, Malaysia, Indonesia, and other Southeast Asian countries. Starting from August 2004 to as far as late as 2005.

Tata Young received the MTV Immies: Indian Music Excellence and the popular music awards in India for this song. She later went on tour for Dhoom Dhoom around the world. The song later appears on Best of Tata Young, a compilation album in tribute for her greatest hits.

== EP ==
The success of "Dhoom Dhoom" paved the way for the release of the "Dhoom Dhoom EP".

== Music video ==
The music video first appeared in the movie Dhoom. It shows Tata Young singing and appearances of several Bollywood actors from the film, Abhishek Bachchan, John Abraham, and Uday Chopra.

It shows various clips from the movie, mostly stunts, mixed into the video towards the beginning. At first she is seen dancing. Tata Young is later seen with Abhishek Bachchan and the two sit together in a hot tub surrounded by thousands of lit candles. Next she is in an S and M-styled scene, whip in hand, with a tied up Uday Chopra. Finally, John Abraham and Tata Young are playfully fighting in a large pool of mud.

The making of the music video, "Dhoom Dhoom", appeared on MTV India and was hosted by Tata Young and Arjun Sablok.

== Alleged plagiarism ==
The Canadian songwriter Jesse Cook accused Pritam of copying his song "Mario Takes a Walk" (from his album Gravity) for "Dhoom Dhoom". Cook commented in an interview that he loves Pritam's version and that "there’s no reason to steal when I would be happy to share".

== Cultural references ==
On November 4, 2025, New York City mayor-elect Zohran Mamdani played the song as he walked off the stage after his victory speech on election night.
