= Wi Chaa Pae =

Wi Chaa Pae (วิชาแพะ)
- Vinyl and CD version in 1991

Studio album by Carabao
- Released: December 1991
- Recorded: 1990
- Genre: Phleng phuea chiwit • Rock & roll • Cha-cha-chá • Folk rock • Hard rock • Reggae
- Length: 40:30
- Label: D-Day Entertainment (1991); Warner Music Thailand (2000)
- Producer: Carabao

Carabao chronology
Ham Chot Khwai (1990)	Wi Chaa Pae (วิชาแพะ) (1991)	Satcha Sip Prakan (1992)

Alternative cover
- Compact Cassette version

Wi Chaa Pae (Thai: วิชาแพะ) was the eleventh album by Thai folk rock band Carabao. It was released in December 1991 under the record label D-Day Entertainment. The album has several music styles, some popular songs from this album include Wi Chaa Pae, Narok Corruption, Big Su (this song tribute too Suraphol Sombatcharoen and Nga Caravan), Lek Khiew Rock Alone, Nai Kor, Phor Lee, Hua Jai Ram Wong. Coca-Cola was sponsor for this album.

== Track listing ==
Songs
No.	Title	Length
1.	"วิชาแพะ (Wi Chaa Pae)"	4:06
2.	"นายกอ (Nai Kor)"	5:08
3.	"นรกคอรัปชั่น (Narok Corruption)"	4:32
4.	"ดงพญาใจเย็น (Dong Phaya Chai Yen)"	2:50
5.	"หนาวมั๊ยปู่ (Naw Mai Poo)"	3:36
6.	"พ่อหลี (Phor Lee)"	4:17
7.	"เล็กเคียวร็อกอะโลน (Lek Khiew Rock Alone)"	4:18
8.	"ลุงหริ (Loong Ri)"	3:05
9.	"บิ๊กสุ (Big Su)"	4:23
10.	"หัวใจรำวง (Hua Jai Ram Wong)"	4:15
Total length:		40:30

== Personnel ==
=== Carabao members ===
- Aed Carabao – vocals, acoustic guitar
- Preecha Chanapai – electric guitar, vocals (on "Naw Mai Poo" and "Phor Lee")
- Nuphong Prathompattama – electric bass guitar, vocals (on "Loong Ri")

=== Backup ===
- Luechai Ngamsom – piano, trumpet
- Choochart Noodouang – drum set
- Kitti Kanchanasathit – electric guitar
- Theerawilat Chulomkorn – saxophone
