= Welcome to Thailand =

เวลคัมทูไทยแลนด์ (Welcome To Thailand)

Studio album by Carabao
- Released: 1987
- Recorded: 1987
- Genre: Soft Rock • Phleng phuea chiwit • Thai pop
- Length: n/a
- Label: Waaew Waan (1987); Warner Music Thailand (2011)
- Producer: Carabao

Carabao chronology
Prachathippatai (1986)	เวลคัมทูไทยแลนด์ (Welcome To Thailand) (1987)	Thap Lang (1988)

Alternative cover

Welcome to Thailand (เวลคัมทูไทยแลนด์) is the eighth album by Thai rock band Carabao. It was released in 1987. Popular songs include Welcome to Thailand, Krathang Dokmai Hai Khun, and Bap Borisut.

== Tracklist ==
Track	Thai	Transcription
01	เวลคัมทูไทยแลนด์	Welcome to Thailand
02	บิ๊กเสี่ยว	Big Siao
03	สบายกว่า	Sabai Kwa
04	กระถางดอกไม้ให้คุณ	Krathang Dokmai Hai Khun
05	เทวดาท่าจะแย่	Thewada Tha Cha Yae
06	สังกะสี	Sangkasi
07	นีออน	Neon
08	คนหนังเหนียว	Khon Nang Niao
09	บาปบริสุทธิ์	Bap Borisut
10	ถึกควายทุย 8	Thuek Khwai Thui Paet
