= Chang Hai =

ช้างไห้ (Chang Hai)

Studio album by Carabao
- Released: 1993
- Recorded: 1993
- Genre: Phleng phuea chiwit; alternative rock
- Label: D-Day (1993); Warner Thailand (2013)
- Producer: Carabao

Carabao chronology
Satcha Sip Prakan (1992)	ช้างไห้ (Chang Hai) (1993)	Khon Sang Chat (1994)

Singles from Chang Hai
- 1. "Chang Hai (ช้างไห้)"; 2. "Yai Sam-aang"; 3. "Raeng Khoi"; 4. "Salawin"; 5. "Yang Mai Sai (ยังไม่สาย)"

Chang Hai (Thai: ช้างไห้) was the thirteenth album by Thai rock band Carabao. It was released in 1993. Its popular songs include "Yai Sam-aang" and "Raeng Khoi".

== Track listing ==
Track	Thai	Transcription
01	ช้างไห้	Chang Hai
02	ปกากะญอ	Pakakayo
03	ทายาทตระกูลหยี	Thayat Trakun Yi
04	ยายสำอาง	Yai Sam-ang
05	ครู'เล	Khru Le
06	แร้งคอย	Raeng Khoi
07	เสียงอีสาน	Siang Isan
08	กำลังใจแรงงาน	Kamlangchai Rang-ngan
09	สาละวิน	Salawin
10	ยังไม่สาย	Yang Mai Sai

=== Single for albums ===
1. Chang Hai
2. Yai Sam-ang
3. Raaeg Khoi
4. Salawin
5. Yang Mai Sai
