= Dangerous TATA =

Dangerous Tata

Studio album by Tata Young
- Released: July 26, 2005
- Recorded: 2005
- Genres: String, R&B, hip hop
- Length: 43:10
- Label: Sony BMG
- Producers: Rojchana Varopas and Tata Young

Tata Young chronology
| I Believe (2004) | Dangerous Tata (2005) | Best of Tata Young (2006) |

Dangerous Tata is the sixth studio album by Thai singer Tata Young. It marks a return to her performing Thai pop after her fifth studio album, I Believe, in 2004 and her first Thai album since her fourth studio album, Real TT, In 2003. It also signaled a new direction for her, recording with the Thai rap music group Thaitanium and the R&B boyband, B5, however this new style seemed only but a phase in the singer's career, being that her styled changed once more in her following seventh studio album: "Temperature Rising"

== Track listing ==
1. Only Two Of Us (Song Kon Nueng Kuen, Bonus Track)
2. I Believe (Thai Version) (Bonus Track)
3. Dangerous (featuring Thaitanium)
4. Shining (featuring Nop Ponchamni)
5. Completely
6. Love Without A Cause
7. I'll Be Your Girl
8. Give It Back To Me
9. Love Song In The Wind (featuring Tor+)
10. In The Mood (featuring Prem. B)
11. Hey Ma Ma Say
12. Calling Inside (featuring B5)
