= Ready for Love (album) =

Studio album by Tata Young
- Released: August 25, 2009
- Recorded: 2008
- Genres: Pop, R&B, dance-pop
- Length: 43:01
- Label: Sony Music Thailand
- Producers: André "Brix" Buchmann, Ingo Politz, Bernd Wendlandt, Hawes Timothy, Jaimes Steve Welton, Mattias Lindblom, Winston Sela, Swain Anthony John, Mhondera Obi Simbarashe, Peter Wright, Sebastian Thott, Alex Smith, Mark Taylor, Ayak Thiik

Tata Young chronology
One Love (2008)	Ready for Love (2009)

Singles from Ready for Love
- 1. "Ready For Love" Released: July 1, 2009; 2. "My Bloody Valentine" Released: August 25, 2009; 3. "Mission Is You" Released: October 28, 2009

Ready For Love is the ninth studio album and third English language album by Thai singer Tata Young, released on August 25, 2009. The album's first single, "Ready For Love", was written by Alex Smith, Mark Taylor and Ayak Thiik and produced by André Brix Buchman from Valicon Company in Germany. It also features a track "Perfection" co-written by Leona Lewis along with many of the tracks written by internationally acclaimed songwriters.

== Concept ==
The album is a rhythm-and-blues and dance-pop take on 12 tunes from songwriters around the world.

The title track, which had been airing for a couple of weeks, "feels cool and energetic like in the '60s", Tata says, saying she learned the "big voice" techniques of American R&B singers Aretha Franklin, Beyoncé and Jennifer Hudson. "My Bloody Valentine," written by Alex James (Alexandra Burke, Charice, Adam Lambert) and Busbee (Toni Braxton, Jonas Brothers, Alexandra Burke) was released as a follow-up single. "Mission is You" and "Shine Like a Superstar" are Silom Soi 2-style rousers. "Burning Out" and "Suffocate" get melancholic. "Ugly" is a return to the catchy form of "Sexy, Naughty, Bitchy" and "Love is the Law" sounds like Madonna's "Rain". Tata calls "Boys Will Be Boys" her favourite track, and "Exposed" the "opposite of her real life." "It isn't me, but the Sony bosses in Europe said it's gonna be a hit there." The song is about a small-town girl who's dumped by her lover after she becomes famous.

== Promotions and tours ==
A massive advertising campaign pushed "Ready for Love" across Asia. Indonesia, the Philippines, Malaysia, Hong Kong, India, Singapore and Japan received an unprecedented level of promotion for an album by a Thai pop artist.

For the first time, Tata Young broke into the Australian and European markets. Her first taste of Australian audiences came in October 2009, when she performed three songs from her new album at the One Movement music festival in Perth, Western Australia.

== Track listing ==
No.	Title	Writer(s)	Producer(s)	Length
1.	"Ready For Love"	Alex Smith, M. Taylor, A. Thiik	A. Buchmann, B. Wendlandt, I. Politz	3:42
2.	"Mission Is You"	Hiten Bharadia, Philippe-Marc Anquetil, Christopher Lee-Joe	A. Buchmann, B. Wendlandt, I. Politz	3:03
3.	"Burning Out"	Kinnda Hamdin, Didrik Thott, Sebastian Thott, Ameerah EL Ouiglani	A. Buchmann, B. Wendlandt, I. Politz	3:44
4.	"My Bloody Valentine"	Alex James, Fridolin Tai Nordsoeø Schjoldan, Busbee	A. Buchmann, B. Wendlandt, I. Politz	3:51
5.	"Ugly"	Tysper, Mack	A. Buchmann, B. Wendlandt, I. Politz	3:22
6.	"Shine Like A Superstar"	Ian Mack, Stuart Crichton, Tommy Lee James	A. Buchmann, B. Wendlandt, I. Politz	2:54
7.	"Suffocate"	Tim Hawes, Obi Mhondera	A. Buchmann, B. Wendlandt, I. Politz	3:50
8.	"Words Are Not Enough"	Martin Ankelius	A. Buchmann, B. Wendlandt, I. Politz	4:06
9.	"Perfection"	Billy Steinberg, Josh Alexander, Ruth Anne Cunningham, L. Lewis	A. Buchmann, B. Wendlandt, I. Politz	3:16
10.	"Boys Will Be Boys"	Chris Braide, Andreas Carlsson	A. Buchmann, B. Wendlandt, I. Politz	3:33
11.	"Love Is The Law"	Anders Wollbeck, Mattias Lindblom, Daniel Presley	A. Buchmann, B. Wendlandt, I. Politz	4:10
12.	"Exposed"	Winston Sela, Tony Swain, Steve Welton-James	A. Buchmann, B. Wendlandt, I. Politz	3:30
Total length:				43:01

Bonus Videos CD
No.	Title	Length
1.	"Ready For Love" (Music Video)	3:45
2.	"The Making of Music Video - Ready For Love"	5:37
Total length:		9:22

== Charts ==
Chart	Single	Peak
SEED Chart (Thailand)	Ready For Love	#1
SUSHI 99.1 FM. (Indonesia)	Ready For Love	#1
Radio-M 107.1 FM Martapura (Indonesia)	Ready For Love	#1
SKY Radio 89.3 FM Banjarmasin (Indonesia)	Ready For Love	#1
Paramuda 93.7 FM Bandung (Indonesia)	Ready For Love	#1
BIMANTARA FM (Indonesia)	Ready For Love	#1
virgin soft Chart (Thailand)	My Bloody Valentine	#1
EAZY 105.5 FM. (Thailand)	My Bloody Valentine	#1, 6 weeks

== Release history ==
Country	Date
Indonesia	August 24, 2009
Thailand	August 25, 2009
Hong Kong	August 26, 2009
Philippines	August 28, 2009
Taiwan	September 1, 2009
Korea	September 8, 2009
Malaysia	September 14, 2009
Singapore	September 15, 2009
Australia	November 6, 2009
Europe	February 2010
