= Thaitanium =

Thai hip-hop group

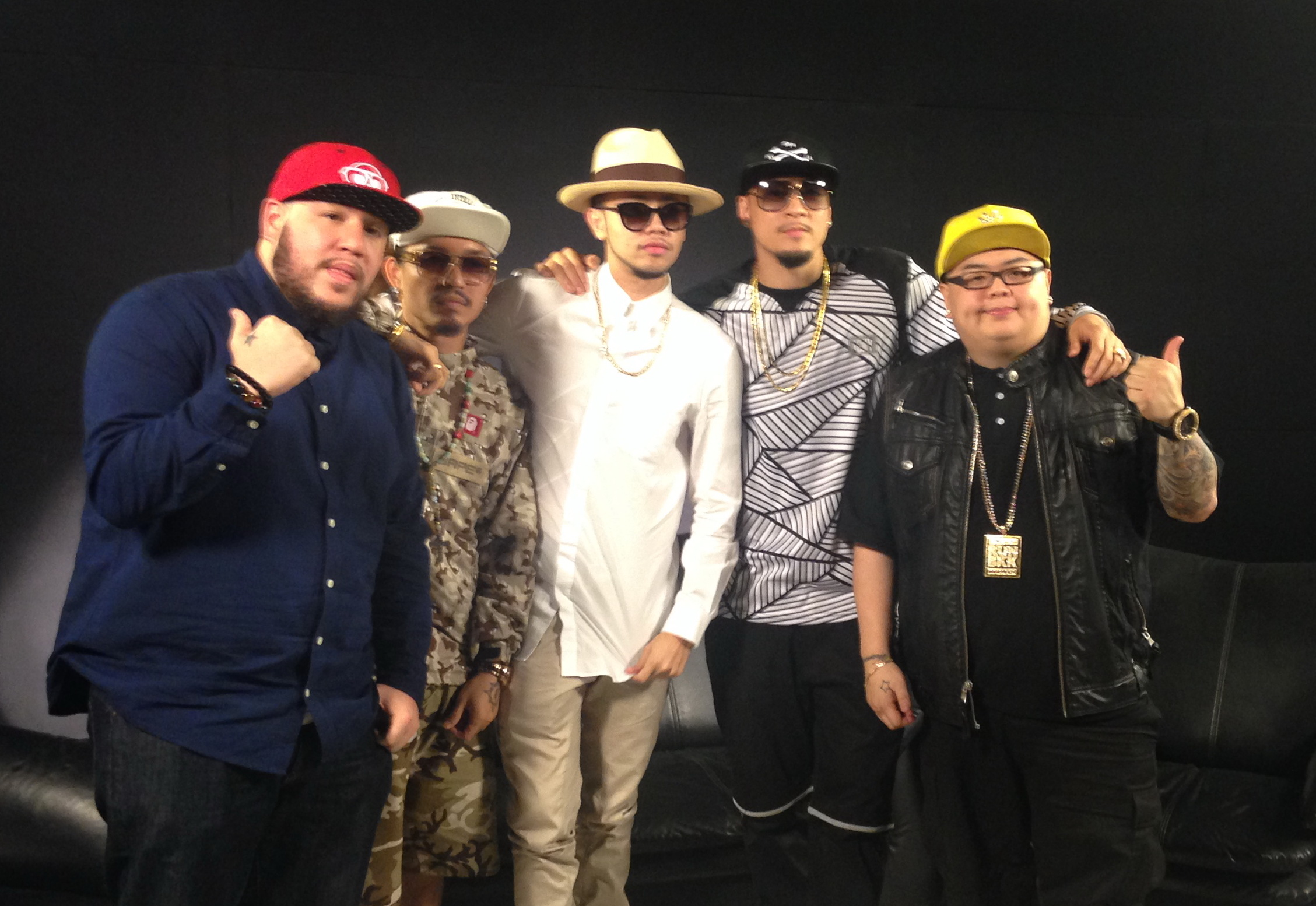
- Thaitanium in March 2015

Background information
- Origin: Bangkok, Thailand
- Genre: Rap
- Years active: 2000–present
- Label: Thaitanium Entertainment
- Members: Khanngoen "Khan" Nuanual; Nay Myo "Day" Thant; Big Calo; DJ Buddah
- Past members: J-Roc; Prinya "Daboyway" Intachai

Thaitanium (Thai: ไทยเทเนี่ยม) is a Thai-American hip hop music group. Among the first of Thai rap artists, the group formed in 2000 by K.H. - Khanngoen "Khan" Nuanual, P. Cess - Prinya "Way" Intachai, Sunny Day - Nay Mayo "Day" Thot.

== Group history ==
Thaitanium's first two albums, AA and Thai Riders, were produced and recorded in New York City and released in Thailand in 2000 and 2002. Subsequent album releases cemented the group's popularity in Thailand, where it was played in night clubs, bars and at music festivals. Their popularity in other surrounding countries grew over time as well. They have toured and performed all over the world - in the United States as well as all over Asia - such as Japan, Malaysia, Singapore and elsewhere.

The group performed the soundtrack to the Thai film Province 77, about Thai people living in Los Angeles. Thaitanium was featured on "Dangerous", a track by Thai pop singer Tata Young in 2005. The group performed at the 2006 MTV Asia Awards, joining Simon Webbe in a performance of "No Worries." The group also opened for Fort Minor and 50 Cent in a concert in February 2006 at Aktiv Square, Mueang Thong Thani in Bangkok. It is unknown if this was in fact authorized as the group was subsequently escorted out from the concert. The group then released its fifth album, Thailand's Most Wanted and supported it with its first adult film "MTV Live: Thaitanium Uncensored" on 15 November 2006 at BEC-TERO Hall. "Reven" Thaitanium's Album called "Still Resisting" was released on June 8, 2010. It includes hit songs such as "Long Loey (หลงเลย) [Feat. แบงค์ Clash & สิงห์ Sqweez Animal]" and "Yapper" and the single "No Stoppin' Us" featuring Lil' Fame of M.O.P. and Blahzay Blahzay. Thaitanium has released numerous hit singles with music videos - including one featuring Snoop Dogg called "WAKE UP (Bangkok City)" in 2014. Thaitanium's latest album, "Now" was released August 25, 2017.

The members of Thaitanium currently work on their own projects as well as their collective music. Khan and Day started their own clothing line called "9Face". DJ Buddha has as well, known for his "RUN BKK" hats and t-shirts. Way started and owns his own chain of barber shops, Never Say Cutz, and its associated brand, NVSC Supply Co., with its own line of hair products, apparel and more. Vice Magazine called the chain "Bangkok's flagship barbershop."

== Others ==
- Presenter of advertising mobile i-mobile309.
- Ambassador of Toyota Yaris Me and present of Yaris Me.
- Created 2 songs with 2 AA for Coke advertising named Song Kran and Coca-Cola. These songs are featured in the album Back At It: The Compilation Vol.2

== Discography ==
=== Studio albums ===
- AA (2000)
- Thai Riders (2002)
- Province 77 (movie soundtrack) (2003)
- R.A.S. (Resisting Against da System) (2004)
- Thailand's Most Wanted (2006)
- Flipside (2008)
- Thaitanium Limited Edition (2008)
- Still Resisting (2010)
- Thaitanium (2014)
- "16 Years" (2016)
- NOW (2017)

=== Compilations ===
- Thaitanium Mix Tape Volume 1
- Thaitanium Mix Tape Volume 2
- Thaitanium Mix Tape Volume 3
- Thaitanium Mix Tape Volume 4
- Thaitanium Mix Tape: The Collection
- Thaitanium Mix Tape Volume 5
- Thaitanium Mix Tape Volume 6

=== Guest appearances ===
- "Dangerous", Tata Young, Dangerous Tata (2005)
- "Love Me, Hate the Game", M-Flo loves Chan, Thaitanium, Edison Chen, Ryohei Cosmicolor (2007)
- "Won (Remix)" The Peach Band
- "No.1 Lady" Panadda Ruangwut
- "Sam-red-eang" Kidnapper
- "Knock Knock" Gift-Monotone
- "Seang-Tee-Tam-Ha" Sleeping Sheep
- "Hey Lover" Nop Ponchamni
- "Let's Get Down" Golf-Mike Feat. Khan Thaitanium, Get Ready (2008)
- "Ja" Sek Loso Feat. Khan Thaitanium (2010)
- "Hey Sexy" CASH, CASH (2008)
- "Ruang-Tam-Ma-Da" Super Strings feat. Way Thaitanium, Kalawitat (2008)
- "Marabahaya", E.A.R. Project
- "Southeast A", E.A.R. Project
- "My Lady", Suburban, ONE
- "Ja-Jeeb-Ko-Bok-Na" Nanny Bell Girly berry

"Long Loey", Bank Clash (2010)

- "Mahanakorn Bangkok City", Thaitanium Ft. Da Endorphine (December 2010)
- "All the Way Up" (Fat Joe and Remy Ma song 2016) The Asian remix was released, featuring Jay Park, AK-69, DaboyWay, SonaOne and Joe Flizzow.
- "No Bodyguard", Illslick featuring KH

=== Studio albums ===
- MTV Asia Awards 2006 - Most popular singer branch
- Fast Awards - Best Group of the year.
- Seed Awards - Best Group of The Year
- See San Awards - Best Hip Hop Album of The Year
- AVIMA 2009 - Best Hip Hop Group with Dice & K9 (Mobbstarr) from Philippine

== Portfolio ==
=== Drama ===
- ละครซีรีส์ "รักทีนเอตต้องเกรดเอ" (แสดงร่วมกับศิลปินวง ทีนเอตเกรดเอ) ออกอากาศทางช่อง 5 (พ.ศ. 2541)
- ละครโทรทัศน์ "วัยอลวน อลวนหนนี้...ไม่มีถอย" ออกอากาศทางช่อง 3 คู่กับ อัจฉรา เคิร์ก (พ.ศ. 2542)
- ละครซีรีส์ "Six The Series เรื่องคืนนั้น... ยังจำไม่ลืม ตอน Promise " (แสดงร่วมกับศิลปินวง ทีนเอตเกรดเอ) ออกอากาศทางไลน์ทีวี (พ.ศ. 2564)

=== Films ===
- 303 กลัว กล้า อาฆาต (พ.ศ. 2541)
- จังหวัด 77 (พ.ศ. 2545)
- From an Objective Point of View (พ.ศ. 2545)
- Rhythm of the Saints (พ.ศ. 2546)
- Spit (พ.ศ. 2548)
- History (พ.ศ. 2550)
- Word on the Street (พ.ศ. 2551)
- Just Another Hustle (พ.ศ. 2552)
- The Prince and Me 4 (พ.ศ. 2552)
- มายเบสต์บอดีการ์ด (พ.ศ. 2553)
- Mindfulness and Murder สติ สืบ ศพ (พ.ศ. 2553)
- Choice คู่ซี้ดีแต่ฝัน (พ.ศ. 2556)
- โกงพลิกเกม Game Changer (พ.ศ. 2564)

== Awards ==
Year	Award-Giving Body	Category	Work	Result
2014	16th Mnet Asian Music Awards	Artist of the Year in Thailand	—N/a	Nominated
