= I Believe (Tata Young album) =

Album by Tata Young

Studio album by Tata Young
- Released: 25 February 2004 (Asia)
- Recorded: 2003
- Genres: Pop, dance-pop, R&B
- Length: 41:59 (Standard Edition); 54:48 (Special Limited Edition); 56:53 (Thank You Edition)
- Labels: Sony Music, Columbia
- Producer: Hitvision for Murlyn Music AB

Tata Young chronology
Real TT (2003)	I Believe (2004)	Dangerous TATA (2005)

Singles from I Believe
- 1. "Sexy, Naughty, Bitchy"; 2. "I Believe"; 3. "Cinderella"; 4. "I Think Of You"; 5. "Dhoom Dhoom"

I Believe is the fifth studio album and debut English language album by Thai singer Tata Young and was debuted on 14 February 2004 in Singapore and was released on 25 February 2004 in Asia. The album was a hit throughout Asia, selling more than 1 million copies and being certified gold in India. The album's lead single, "Sexy, Naughty, Bitchy" broke the top 10 on the Oricon charts in Japan and was one of the most successful Asian singles of the year; "Sexy, Naughty, Bitchy" dominated the airwaves and charts throughout Southeast Asia and South Asia including Thailand, Indonesia, and India . The song, "I Believe", topped the charts in Hong Kong and was a major success throughout Southeast Asia whilst also reaching the top 20 throughout East Asia. Young promoted the album in Thailand and India in mid 2004.

The title track was used as the 2007 AFC Asian Cup theme song.

== Track listing ==
Standard Edition
No.	Title	Writer(s)	Original Artist(s)	Length
1.	"Everybody Doesn't"	Arnthor Birgisson, Amanda Lameche, Tina Harris, Jamelia Davis	Amanda (from Everybody Doesn't (2001))	3:02
2.	"Sexy, Naughty, Bitchy"	David Clewett, Ivar Lisinski, Savan Kotecha		3:28
3.	"I Believe"	Martin Ankelius, Henrik Andersson, Carola Häggkvist	Carola (from My Show (2001))	3:17
4.	"Call Him Mine"	Jocke-E, S. Kotecha		3:57
5.	"Cinderella"	Lindy Robbins, Kevin Savigar	i5 (from i5 (2000)) / Play (from Us Against The World (2001)) / The Cheetah Girls (from The Cheetah Girls (2003))	3:34
6.	"Lonely In Space"	M. Ankelius, H. Andersson, Victoria Horn		3:00
7.	"I Think Of You"	Robin Scoffield, Reed Vertelney		3:43
8.	"Bad Boys, Sad Girls"	Aleena, M. Ankelius, H. Andersson		3:03
9.	"Sorry Anyway"	David Eriksen, Aleena		3:32
10.	"Crush On You"	M. Ankelius, H. Andersson		3:22
11.	"My World's Spinning"	M. Ankelius, H. Andersson		4:04
12.	"I Want What I Want"	Lauren Christy, Charlie Midnight	L. Christy (from Breed (1997))	3:57
Total length:				41:59

Note: All tracks were produced, arranged and recorded by Hitvision for Murlyn Music AB.

Bonus VCD
No.	Title	Length
1.	"Sexy, Naughty, Bitchy" (Music Video)
2.	"Interview"

Special Limited Edition
No.	Title	Writer(s)	Producer(s)	Length
13.	"Sexy, Naughty, Bitchy" (DJ Rajiv Bollywood Remix)	D. Clewett, Ivar Linsinki, S. Kotecha	Hitvision for Murlyn Music AB	3:11
14.	"I Believe" (DDP Remix)	M. Ankelius, H. Andersson, C. Häggkvist	Hitvision for Murlyn Music AB	4:38
15.	"Sexy, Naughty, Bitchy" (Futon Remix)	D. Clewett, I. Linsinki, S. Kotecha	Hitvision for Murlyn Music AB	5:00
Total length:				54:48

Special Limited Edition [Bonus VCD]
No.	Title	Length
1.	"Sexy, Naughty, Bitchy" (Karaoke)
2.	"I Believe" (Karaoke)
3.	"Cinderella" (Karaoke)
4.	"I Think Of You" (Karaoke)
5.	"Call Him Mine" (Karaoke)
6.	"Sexy, Naughty, Bitchy" (Live Performance)
7.	"Cinderella" (Live Performance)
8.	"I Think Of You" (Live Performance)
9.	"I Believe" (Live Performance)

Thank You Edition
No.	Title	Writer(s)	Length
13.	"Dhoom Dhoom" (from the Original Motion Picture Soundtrack Dhoom)	Asif Ali Baig	4:21
14.	"Sexy, Naughty, Bitchy" (Japanese Version)	English lyrics by D. Clewett, Ivar Linsinki, S. Kotecha; Japanese lyrics by Miyako Hashimoto	3:31
15.	"I Believe" (Japanese Version)	English lyrics by M. Ankelius, H. Andersson, C. Häggkvist; Japanese lyrics by M. Hashimoto	3:19
16.	"I Think Of You" (Japanese Version)	English lyrics by R. Scoffield, R. Vertelney; Japanese lyrics by M. Hashimoto	3:43
Total length:			56:53

Thank You Edition [Bonus DVD]
No.	Title	Length
1.	"Dhoom Dhoom" (Music Video)
2.	"Sexy, Naughty, Bitchy" (Japanese Music Video)
3.	"I Believe" (Japanese Music Video)
4.	"Cinderella" (Music Video)
5.	"Sexy, Naughty, Bitchy" (Music Video)
6.	"I Believe" (Music Video)

== Miscellaneous ==
- "Sexy, Naughty, Bitchy" was changed to "Sexy, Naughty, Cheeky" in Malaysia.
- "Sexy, Naughty, Bitchy" was covered by Lene Alexandra in her album "Welcome To Sillycone Valley". A Norwegian pop singer.
- "Sexy, Naughty, Bitchy" was performed live by Magnus Carlsson in a Swedish language version: "Sexig, Kaxig, Bitchig Man"
- "Sexy, Naughty, Bitchy" was covered by Baby VOX Re.V (2nd Album : Release Date: July 11, 2008), a Korean female Group. and changed to "Sexy".
- "I Believe" is chosen as the official theme song for 2007 AFC Asian Cup which Thailand co-hosts with Vietnam, Malaysia and Indonesia.
- "I Believe" was covered by Baby VOX Re.V (2nd Album : Release Date: July 11, 2008), a Korean female Group.
