= Temperature Rising (album) =

Studio album by Tata Young
- Released: August 24, 2006 (Asia); August 23, 2006 (Japan); September 12, 2006 (Malaysia); September 18, 2006 (Philippines); September 12, 2006 (Taiwan) August 24, 2006 (Thailand); March 8, 2007 (India)
- Genres: Pop, R&B
- Length: 41:05
- Label: Sony BMG
- Producers: David Gray & Doug Banker

Tata Young chronology
Best of Tata Young (2006)	Temperature Rising (2006)	One Love (2008)

Singles from Temperature Rising
- 1. "El Nin-YO!"; 2. "Zoom"; 3. "Come Rain Come Shine"; 4. "For You I Will"

Temperature Rising is the seventh studio album and second English language album by Thai singer Tata Young. It was released in 2006. The album consists of both original and cover songs. The album's title comes from the lyrics of the first single "El Nin-YO!" ("You got my temperature rising like El Nin-YO!"). The single "Zoom" was released in September.

"Come Rain Come Shine", the third single, was used in Star World's station promo's from December 2006 to mid-2007. The promo includes footage of Tata Young singing "Come Rain Come Shine" as well as scenes from some of Star World's television shows (Everybody Loves Raymond, American Idol etc.)

Track #7, "Zoom", was covered by Ashley Tisdale on her 2007 debut album Headstrong, under the title as "Don't Touch (The Zoom Song)".

Temperature Rising was the last Tata Young album released on cassette tapes, but in very small numbers produced in a short time until September 2006.

== Track listing ==
No.	Title	Writer(s)	Producer(s)	Length
1.	"El Nin-YO!"	Hiten Bharadia, Philippe-Marc Anquetil, Christopher Lee-Joe	P-M Anquetil, C. Lee-Joe	3:20
2.	"Back Outta This"	Adam Anders, Nikki Hassman, Rasmus Bille Bähncke, René Tromborg, Samantha Jade	A. Anders, N. Hassman	3:29
3.	"I Want Some Of That" (Originally performed by Sarah Connor / Key to My Soul, 2003)	Diane Warren	Alex Greggs, Danny O'Donoghue	3:32
4.	"Come Rain Come Shine" (Originally performed by Jenn Cuneta / Come Rain Come Shine: Single, 2005)	Paul McCartney, Linda McCartney, Frank Lamboy, Andrew Wedeen	F. Lamboy, A. Wedeen	3:49
5.	"Uh Oh" (Originally performed by Rosette Sharma / Uh Oh, 2005)	Anthony Anderson, Dane DeViller, Sean Hosein, R. Sharma, Steve Smith	A. Anderson, S. Smith, S. Hosein, D. DeViller	3:29
6.	"Betcha Neva" (Originally performed by Cherie / Cherie, 2004)	Alan Ross, David James, Natasha Bedingfield	A. Greggs, D. O'Donoghue	3:09
7.	"Zoom"	A. Anders, N. Hassman, R. B. Bähncke, R. Tromborg	A. Anders, N. Hassman	3:18
8.	"For You I Will" (Originally performed by Monica / Space Jam, 1996)	D. Warren	P-M Anquetil, C. Lee-Joe	3:58
9.	"I Must Not Chase The Boys" (Originally performed by Play / Replay, 2003)	Pam Sheyene, Bill Padley, Jem Godfrey	A. Greggs, D. O'Donoghue	2:56
10.	"I Guess I Never Knew My Baby"	Arnthor Birgisson, Anders Bagge, Wayne Hector, Sebastian Nylund	A. Greggs, D. O'Donoghue	3:32
11.	"Superhypnotic" (Originally performed by Shaggy feat. Nicole Scherzinger / Clothes Drop, 2005)	Alex Cantrall, Lindy Robbins, Kenneth Karlin, Carsten "Soulshock" Schack	A. Greggs, D. O'Donoghue	3:04
12.	"Mila Mila" (Originally performed by Anushka Manchanda / Super, 2005)	English lyrics: Scott Moffatt, Clint Moffatt, Bob Moffatt; Indian lyrics: Vipin Kakkar	Sandeep Chowta	3:29
Total length:				41:05

Note: "Come Rain Come Shine" Samples from "Silly Love Songs" by McCartney and McCartney

Bonus VCD
No.	Title	Length
1.	"Making of El Nin-YO!"
2.	"El Nin-YO! Music Video"
3.	"Interview with Tata Young"
4.	"Photo Gallery"

Temperature Rising: Karaoke
No.	Title	Length
1.	"El Nin-YO!"
2.	"Zoom"
3.	"Betcha Neva"
4.	"I Must Not Chase The Boys"
5.	"Uh Oh"
6.	"Back Outta This"
7.	"For You I Will"
