= Tata Young =

Thai singer

Tata Young อมิตา มารี "ทาทา" ยัง
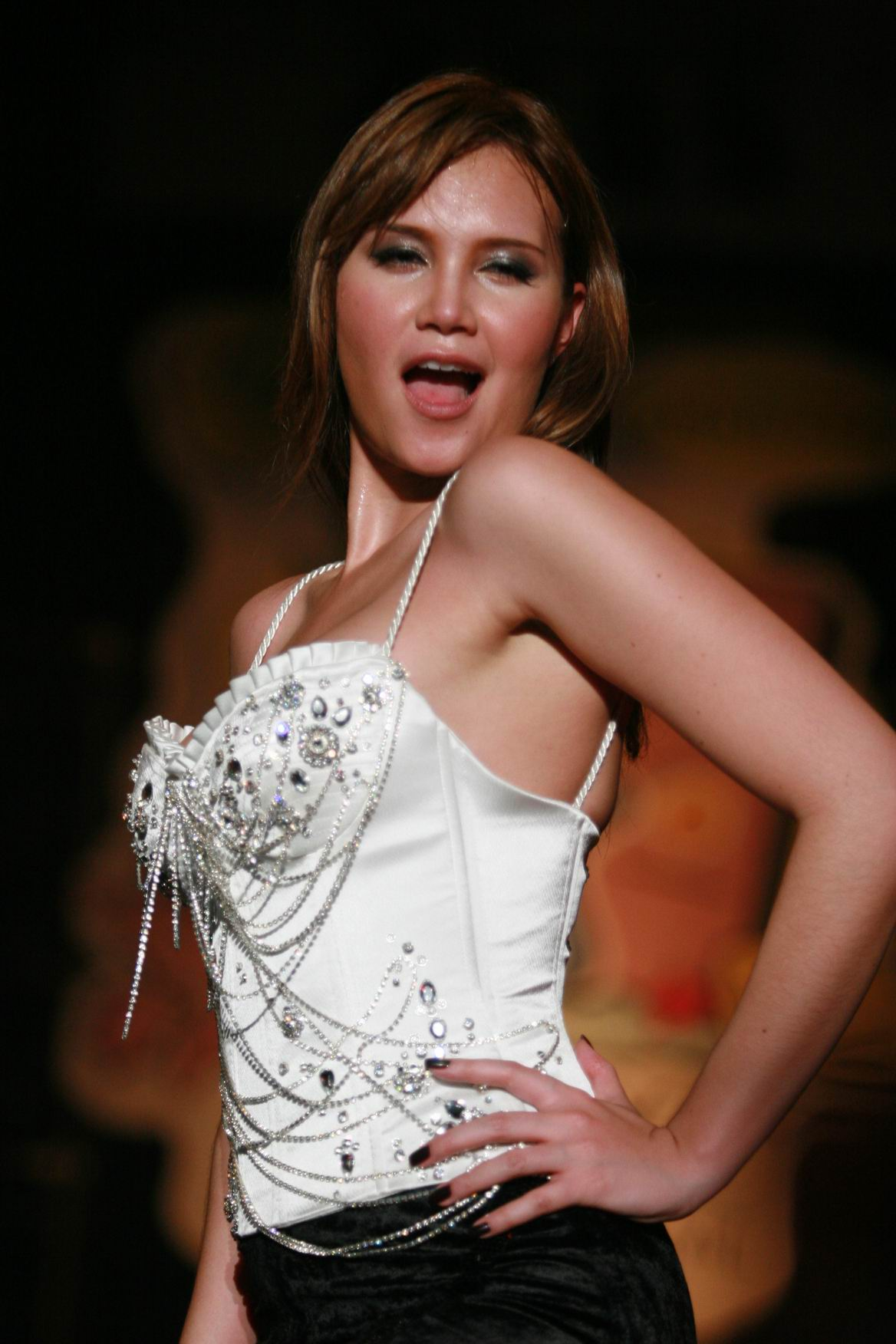
- Tata Young in 2007

Background information
- Born: Amita Marie Young; 14 December 1980 (age 45); Bangkok, Thailand
- Genres: Dance-pop; electropop
- Occupations: Singer; actress; model; entrepreneur
- Instrument: Vocals
- Years active: 1991–present
- Labels: GMM Grammy (1995–2000); Sony BEC-TERO (2001–2003); Sony Music (2004–present)

Amita Marie "Tata" Young (Thai: อมิตา มารี "ทาทา" ยัง; born 14 December 1980) is a Thai singer, actress and model who gained prominence in Thailand when she placed first in a national singing contest at age 11, subsequently signing a record deal and releasing her first album Amita Tata Young in 1995. Young has released nine studio albums, three in English and six in Thai. Her most recent album is Ready for Love, released in 2009.

She has acted in three films, The Red Bike Story (Jakkayan See Daeng), O-Negative and Plai Tien (Wick of the Candle), a TV drama. Young performed "Reach for the Stars" at the Opening Ceremony of the 1998 Asian Games in Bangkok.

Throughout the 2000s, Young enjoyed widespread mainstream popularity across Southeast Asia, East Asia and South Asia winning multiple national and international awards and was often lauded as "Asia's Queen of Pop" and the "Britney Spears of Asia".

== Life and career ==
Tata was born Amita Marie Germania Young in Bangkok to a Thai mother and an American father, Tim Young from Zanesville, Ohio. She went to Bangkok Patana School. At the age of 11, she won her first national talent contest, the Nissan Awards Thailand Junior Singing Contest.

She made her film debut in 1997 in the youth drama The Red Bike Story.

Tata has lent her voice to humanitarian causes, including the AIDS program of Father Joe Maier's Human Development Foundation and MTV's Exit campaign to end human trafficking.

In September 2011, Tata premiered "Let's Play", believed to be her upcoming single, which was written and produced by Jeliah, and co-written by singer-songwriter VASSY and Young herself, it was performed live at the True Academy Fantasia Season 8's Grand Finale Concert as her comeback.

== Discography ==
- Amita Tata Young (1995)
- Amazing TATA (1997)
- Tata Young (2001)
- Real TT (2003)
- I Believe (2004)
- Dangerous TATA (2005)
- Temperature Rising (2006)
- One Love (2008)
- Ready for Love (2009)

== Filmography ==
- The Red Bike Story (1997)
- O-Negative (1998)
- Dhoom (2004)
- Bitter/Sweet (2009)

== Accolades ==
Years	Awards
1992	Nissan Award Best Singer
1995	Vote Award Favorite Singer Best Album Best Music Video
1997	1997: ELLE magazine One of Thailand's 10 Most Influential People
1998	1998: Suphannahong National Film Awards Best Actress
1999	Thai Music Organization Favorite Singer
2000	Cosmopolitan Magazine Award For Fun, Fearless, Female Award 2000
2004	95.5 Virgin Hitz Awards Album of the Year I Believe Favorite Artist of the Year; MTV Immies: Indian Music Excellence Best International Female Pop Act
2005	Japan Golden Disc Award New Artist of the Year; FHM 100 Sexiest Women in the World 2005 (Thai Edition) Sexiest Singer in Thailand; Channel [V] Thailand Music Awards Most Popular International Female Artist of the Year Most Popular Music of the Year
2006	MTV Asia Awards Favourite Artist Thailand; FHM 100 Sexiest Women in the World 2006 (Thai Edition) Sexiest Singer in Thailand; 95.5 Virgin Hitz Awards Fastest Chart Climber 2006 (El Nin-Yo!) Popular Vote International Artist 2006
2007	FHM 100 Sexiest Women in the World 2007 (Thai Edition) Sexiest Singer in Thailand
2009	The Hot Awards 2009 Queen of Hot 2009
2010	Mademan.com Best Thai Female Singer
2010	U.S. EPA Montreal Protocol Award for Tata Young Ambassador for the; United Nations Environment Programme
